= 1988 in the United States =

- Decades: 1960s; 1970s; 1980s; 1990s; 2000s
- See also: History of the United States (1980–1991); Timeline of United States history (1970–1989); List of years in the United States

This is a list of events from the year 1988 in the United States.

== Incumbents ==
=== Federal government ===
- President: Ronald Reagan (R-California)
- Vice President: George H. W. Bush (R-Texas)
- Chief Justice: William Rehnquist (Virginia)
- Speaker of the House of Representatives: Jim Wright (D-Texas)
- Senate Majority Leader: Robert Byrd (D-West Virginia)
- Congress: 100th

==== State governments ====
Governors and lieutenant governors

=== Governors ===
- Governor of Alabama: H. Guy Hunt (Republican)
- Governor of Alaska: Steve Cowper (Democratic)
- Governor of Arizona: Evan Mecham (Republican) (until April 4), Rose Mofford (Democratic) (starting April 4)
- Governor of Arkansas: Bill Clinton (Democratic)
- Governor of California: George Deukmejian (Republican)
- Governor of Colorado: Roy Romer (Democratic)
- Governor of Connecticut: William A O'Neill (Democratic)
- Governor of Delaware: Michael Castle (Republican)
- Governor of Florida: Bob Martinez (Republican)
- Governor of Georgia: Joe Frank Harris (Democratic)
- Governor of Hawaii: John D. Waihee III (Democratic)
- Governor of Idaho: Cecil D. Andrus (Democratic)
- Governor of Illinois: James R. Thompson (Republican)
- Governor of Indiana: Robert D. Orr (Republican)
- Governor of Iowa: Terry E. Branstad (Republican)
- Governor of Kansas: Mike Hayden (Republican)
- Governor of Kentucky: Wallace G. Wilkinson (Democratic)
- Governor of Louisiana: Edwin W. Edwards (Democratic) (until March 14), Buddy Roemer (Democratic)/(Republican) (starting March 14)
- Governor of Maine: John R. McKernan, Jr. (Republican)
- Governor of Maryland: William Donald Schaefer (Democratic)
- Governor of Massachusetts: Michael Dukakis (Democratic)
- Governor of Michigan: James Blanchard (Democratic)
- Governor of Minnesota: Rudy Perpich (Democratic)
- Governor of Mississippi: William Allain (Democratic) (until January 12), Ray Mabus (Democratic) (starting January 12)
- Governor of Missouri: John Ashcroft (Republican)
- Governor of Montana: Ted Schwinden (Democratic)
- Governor of Nebraska: Kay A. Orr (Republican)
- Governor of Nevada: Richard Bryan (Democratic)
- Governor of New Hampshire: John H. Sununu (Republican)
- Governor of New Jersey: Thomas Kean (Republican)
- Governor of New Mexico: Garrey Carruthers (Republican)
- Governor of New York: Mario Cuomo (Democratic)
- Governor of North Carolina: James G. Martin (Republican)
- Governor of North Dakota: George A. Sinner (Democratic)
- Governor of Ohio: Dick Celeste (Democratic)
- Governor of Oklahoma: Henry Bellmon (Republican)
- Governor of Oregon: Neil Goldschmidt (Democratic)
- Governor of Pennsylvania: Robert P. Casey (Democratic)
- Governor of Rhode Island: Edward D. DiPrete (Republican)
- Governor of South Carolina: Carroll A. Campbell, Jr. (Republican)
- Governor of South Dakota: George S. Mickelson (Republican)
- Governor of Tennessee: Ned McWherter (Democratic)
- Governor of Texas: Bill Clements (Republican)
- Governor of Utah: Norman H. Bangerter (Republican)
- Governor of Vermont: Madeleine M. Kunin (Democratic)
- Governor of Virginia: Gerald L. Baliles (Democratic)
- Governor of Washington: Booth Gardner (Democratic)
- Governor of West Virginia: Arch A. Moore, Jr. (Republican)
- Governor of Wisconsin: Tommy Thompson (Republican)
- Governor of Wyoming: Mike Sullivan (Democratic)

=== Lieutenant governors ===
- Lieutenant Governor of Alabama: Jim Folsom, Jr. (Democratic)
- Lieutenant Governor of Alaska: Stephen McAlpine (Democratic)
- Lieutenant Governor of Arkansas: Winston Bryant (Democratic)
- Lieutenant Governor of California: Leo T. McCarthy (Democratic)
- Lieutenant Governor of Colorado: Mike Callihan (Democratic)
- Lieutenant Governor of Connecticut: Joseph J. Fauliso (Democratic)
- Lieutenant Governor of Delaware: Shien Biau Woo (Democratic)
- Lieutenant Governor of Florida: Bobby Brantley (Republican)
- Lieutenant Governor of Georgia: Zell Miller (Democratic)
- Lieutenant Governor of Hawaii: Ben Cayetano (Democratic)
- Lieutenant Governor of Idaho: Butch Otter (Republican)
- Lieutenant Governor of Illinois: George H. Ryan (Republican)
- Lieutenant Governor of Indiana: John Mutz (Republican)
- Lieutenant Governor of Iowa: Jo Ann Zimmerman (Democratic)
- Lieutenant Governor of Kansas: Jack D. Walker (Republican)
- Lieutenant Governor of Kentucky: Brereton Jones (Democratic)
- Lieutenant Governor of Louisiana: Robert "Bobby" Freeman (Democratic) (until March 14), Paul Hardy (Republican) (starting March 14)
- Lieutenant Governor of Maryland: Melvin A. Steinberg (Democratic)
- Lieutenant Governor of Massachusetts: Evelyn Murphy (Democratic)
- Lieutenant Governor of Michigan: Martha W. Griffiths (Democratic)
- Lieutenant Governor of Minnesota: Marlene Johnson (Democratic)
- Lieutenant Governor of Mississippi: Brad Dye (Democratic)
- Lieutenant Governor of Missouri: Harriett Woods (Democratic)
- Lieutenant Governor of Montana: George Turman (Democratic) (until January 4), Gordon McOmber (Democratic) (starting January 4)
- Lieutenant Governor of Nebraska: William E. Nichol (Republican)
- Lieutenant Governor of Nevada: Bob Miller (Democratic)
- Lieutenant Governor of New Mexico: Jack L. Stahl (Republican)
- Lieutenant Governor of New York: Stan Lundine (Democratic)
- Lieutenant Governor of North Carolina: Robert B. Jordan, III (Democratic)
- Lieutenant Governor of North Dakota: Lloyd Omdahl (Democratic)
- Lieutenant Governor of Ohio: Paul R. Leonard (Democratic)
- Lieutenant Governor of Oklahoma: Robert S. Kerr III (Democratic)
- Lieutenant Governor of Pennsylvania: Mark Singel (Democratic)
- Lieutenant Governor of Rhode Island: Richard A. Licht (Democratic)
- Lieutenant Governor of South Carolina: Nick Theodore (Democratic)
- Lieutenant Governor of South Dakota: Walter Dale Miller (Republican)
- Lieutenant Governor of Tennessee: John S. Wilder (Democratic)
- Lieutenant Governor of Texas: William P. Hobby, Jr. (Democratic)
- Lieutenant Governor of Utah: W. Val Oveson (Republican)
- Lieutenant Governor of Vermont: Howard Dean (Democratic)
- Lieutenant Governor of Virginia: Douglas Wilder (Democratic)
- Lieutenant Governor of Washington: John Cherberg (Democratic)
- Lieutenant Governor of Wisconsin: Scott McCallum (Republican)

== Events ==
=== January ===
- January 1
  - The Dell Computer Corporation is incorporated.
  - The Evangelical Lutheran Church in America is established, creating the largest Lutheran denomination in the United States.
- January 2 – Michigan State Spartans football team wins the Rose Bowl Game against the USC Trojans.
- January 4 – Nick Jr. begins as a block of Nickelodeon programming for younger children.
- January 25
  - Ronald Reagan delivers his final State of the Union Address.
  - U.S. Vice President George H. W. Bush and CBS News anchor Dan Rather clash over Bush's role in the Iran–Contra scandal during a contentious television interview.
- January 29 – The Midwest Classic Conference, a U.S. college athletic conference, is formed.

=== February ===
- February 3 – The Democratic-controlled United States House of Representatives rejects President Ronald Reagan's request for $36,250,000 to support the Nicaraguan Contras.
- February 12 – Anthony M. Kennedy is appointed to the Supreme Court of the United States.
- February 14 – Hours after learning the death of his sister, US speed skater Dan Jansen falls twice and fails to win a medal in the 500-meter race in the Calgary Winter Olympics.
- February 16 – Gunman Richard Farley kills seven people inside his former workplace, ESL Incorporated in Sunnyvale, California. He had been stalking colleague Laura Black who still worked there; however, she survived the shooting. Farley is currently on death row.
- February 17 – U.S. Lieutenant Colonel William R. Higgins, serving with a United Nations group monitoring a truce in southern Lebanon, is kidnapped (he is later killed by his captors).
- February 24 – Hustler Magazine v. Falwell: The Supreme Court of the United States sides with Hustler magazine by overturning a lower court decision to award Jerry Falwell $200,000 for defamation.

=== March ===
- March 8
  - Two U.S. Army helicopters collide in Fort Campbell, Kentucky, killing 17 servicemen.
  - U.S. presidential candidate George Herbert Walker Bush defeats Bob Dole in numerous Republican primaries and caucuses on "Super Tuesday". The bipartisan primary/caucus calendar, designed by Democrats to help solidify their own nominee early, backfires when none of the six competing candidates are able to break out of the pack in the day's Democratic contests. Jesse Jackson, however, wins several Southern state primaries.
- March 9 – Blackstone Financial Management is founded as a global asset management company in New York City by eight co-founders, led by Larry Fink. In 1992, it would change its name to BlackRock.
- March 13 – Gallaudet University, a university for the deaf in Washington, D.C., elects Dr. I. King Jordan as the first deaf president in its history, following the Deaf President Now campaign, considered a turning point in the deaf civil rights movement.
- March 16
  - First RepublicBank of Texas fails and enters FDIC receivership, the second-largest FDIC assisted bank failure up to that point.
  - Iran-Contra Affair: Lieutenant Colonel Oliver North and Vice Admiral John Poindexter are indicted on charges of conspiracy to defraud the United States.
  - Rick Walls began his Nuclear career in the U.S. Navy
- March 26 – U.S. presidential candidate Jesse Jackson defeats Michael Dukakis in the Michigan Democratic caucuses, becoming the frontrunner temporarily for the party's nomination. Richard Gephardt withdraws his candidacy after his campaign speeches against imported automobiles fail to earn him much support in Detroit.
- March 27 – The World Wrestling Federation holds WrestleMania IV from the Atlantic City Boardwalk Hall (Promoted as Trump Plaza) in Atlantic City, New Jersey.

=== April ===
- April – The unemployment rate drops to 5.4%, the lowest since June 1974.
- April 1 – In Fort Wayne, Indiana, 8-year-old April Marie Tinsley is kidnapped and murdered.
- April 4 – Governor Evan Mecham of Arizona is convicted in his impeachment trial and removed from office.
- April 5 – Massachusetts Governor Michael Dukakis wins the Wisconsin Democratic presidential primary.
- April 11 – The 60th Academy Awards, hosted by Chevy Chase, are held at the Shrine Auditorium in Los Angeles. Bernardo Bertolucci's The Last Emperor wins all nine of its nominations (the first film to do so since 1958's Gigi), including Best Picture and Best Director.
- April 12 – Former pop singer Sonny Bono is elected Mayor of Palm Springs, California.
- April 14 – The USS Samuel B. Roberts strikes a naval mine in the Persian Gulf, while deployed on Operation Earnest Will, during the Tanker War phase of the Iran–Iraq War.
- April 18 – The United States Navy retaliates for the Roberts mining with Operation Praying Mantis, in a day of strikes against Iranian oil platforms and naval vessels.
- April 28 – Aloha Airlines Flight 243, a scheduled passenger flight to Honolulu, Hawaii originating from Hilo, Hawaii, suffers an explosive decompression after a portion of the aircraft's roof towards front of the fuselage tore off during flight, resulting in the death of a flight attendant. Everybody else onboard survives after the aircraft makes a successful emergency landing at Kahului Airport in Maui, Hawaii.

=== May ===
- May 4 – PEPCON disaster in Henderson, Nevada: A major explosion at an industrial solid-fuel rocket plant causes damage extending up to ten miles away, including Las Vegas's McCarran International Airport.
- May 14 – Bus collision near Carrollton, Kentucky: A drunk driver traveling in the wrong direction on Interstate 71 hits a converted school bus carrying a church youth group from Radcliff, Kentucky. The resulting fire kills 27 people, making it tied for first in the U.S. for most fatalities involving 2 vehicles to the present day. Coincidentally, the other 2-vehicle accident involving a bus that also killed 27 occurred in Prestonsburg, Kentucky thirty years prior.
- May 16
  - A report by U.S. Surgeon General C. Everett Koop states that the addictive properties of nicotine are similar to those of heroin and cocaine.
  - California v. Greenwood: The U.S. Supreme Court rules that police officers do not need a search warrant to search through discarded garbage.
- May 27 – Microsoft releases Windows 2.1.
- May 31 – U.S. President Ronald Reagan addresses 600 Moscow State University students during his visit to the Soviet Union.

=== June ===
- June 1 – The Intermediate-Range Nuclear Forces Treaty, banning intermediate-range missiles in the United States and the Soviet Union, comes into effect.
- June 12 – Rusty Wallace wins the last NASCAR Winston Cup Series Budweiser 400 auto race at Riverside International Raceway in Riverside, California.
- June 14 – A small wildfire is started by a lightning strike in Montana, United States, near the boundary for Yellowstone National Park. The Storm Creek fire expands into the park, then merges with dozens of other drought-aggravated fires. Eventually, over 750,000 acres (3,000 km^{2}) of Yellowstone – 36% of the park's area – burns before firefighters gain control in late September.
- June 22 – Animation/live action crossover movie Who Framed Roger Rabbit is released through Touchstone Pictures. It brings a renewed interest in the Golden Age of American animation, spearheading modern American animation and the Disney Renaissance.
- June 28 – Four workers are asphyxiated at a metal-plating plant in Auburn, Indiana, in the worst confined-space industrial accident in U.S. history (a fifth victim dies two days later).
- June 29 – Morrison v. Olson: The United States Supreme Court upholds the law allowing special prosecutors to investigate suspected crimes by executive branch officials.

=== July ===
- July 3 – Iran Air Flight 655 is shot down by a missile launched from the USS Vincennes.
- July 4 – In Zürich, Switzerland, FIFA chose the United States as the venue to organize the 1994 FIFA World Cup, the United States won with 10 votes, surpassed Morocco with 7 votes and Brazil with 3 votes.
- July 6 – The first reported medical waste on beaches in the Greater New York area (including hypodermic needles and syringes possibly infected with the AIDS virus) washes ashore on Long Island. Subsequent medical waste discoveries on beaches in Coney Island, Brooklyn and in Monmouth County, New Jersey, force the closure of numerous New York–area beaches in the middle of one of the hottest summers on record in the American Northeast.
- July 13 – Miami Arena in Miami, Florida opens.
- July 14 – Volkswagen closes its Westmoreland Assembly Plant after ten years of operation (the first factory built by a non-American automaker in the U.S.).
- July 20 – The Democratic National Convention in Atlanta, Georgia nominates Michael Dukakis as their presidential candidate and Lloyd Bentsen as his running mate.
- July 26 – The death of Tate Rowland leads way to publicized rumors of a Satanic cult in the rural community of Childress, Texas.

=== August ===
- August 6–7 – Tompkins Square Park Police Riot in New York City: A riot erupts in Tompkins Square Park when police attempt to enforce a newly passed curfew for the park. Bystanders, artists, residents, homeless people and political activists are caught up in the police action, which takes place during the night of August 6 and into the early morning of August 7.
- August 9 – Wrigley Field has its first night game of baseball, ending long opposition to lights at the field.
- August 17 – Pakistani President Muhammad Zia-ul-Haq and the U.S. ambassador to Pakistan, Arnold Raphel, are killed in a plane crash near Bhawalpur.
- August 18 – The Republican National Convention in New Orleans, Louisiana nominates Vice President George H. W. Bush as their presidential candidate and Dan Quayle as his running mate.
- August 29 – The World Wrestling Federation holds its inaugural SummerSlam event from Madison Square Garden in New York City, New York.

=== September ===
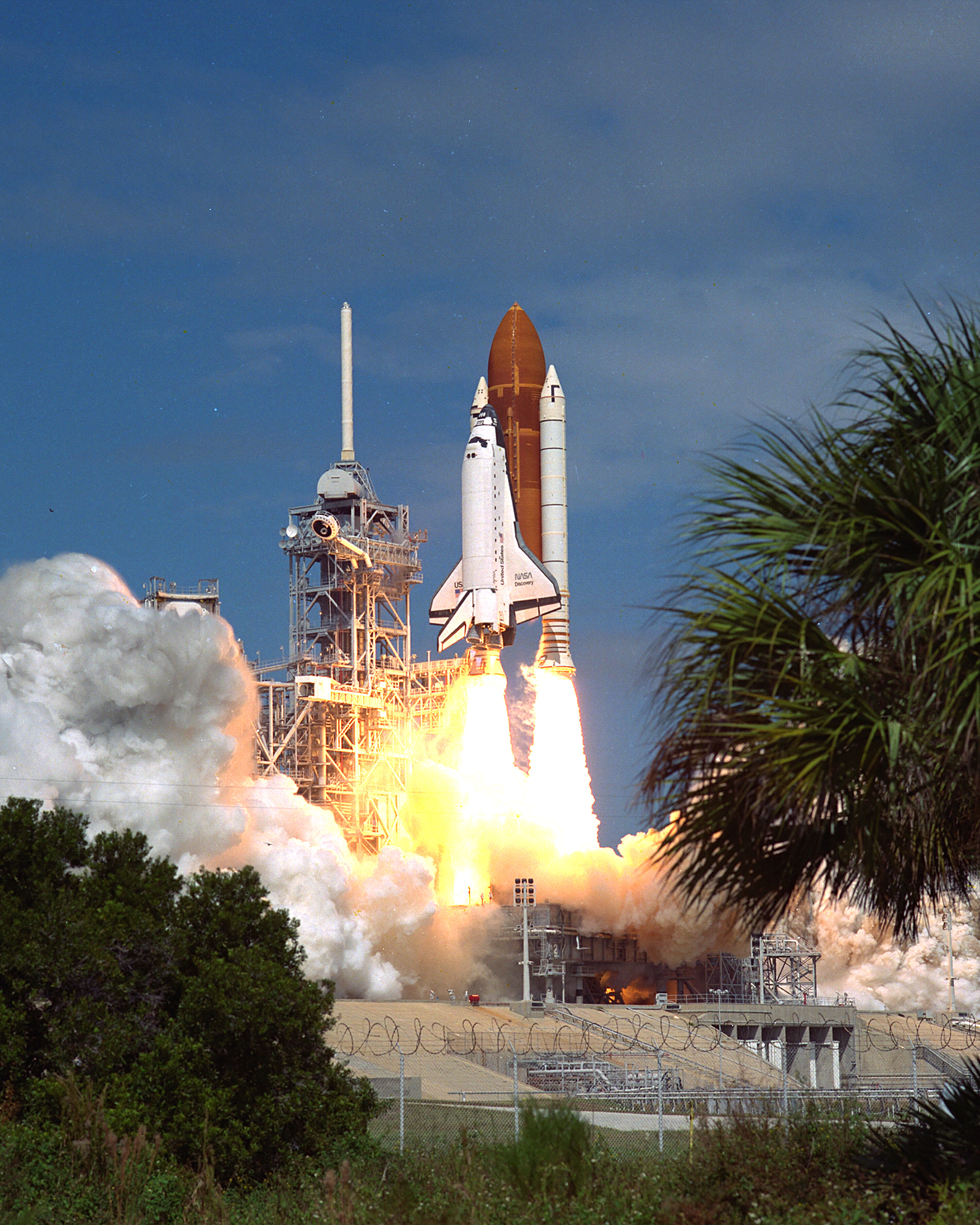
September 29: STS-26, "Return to Flight"

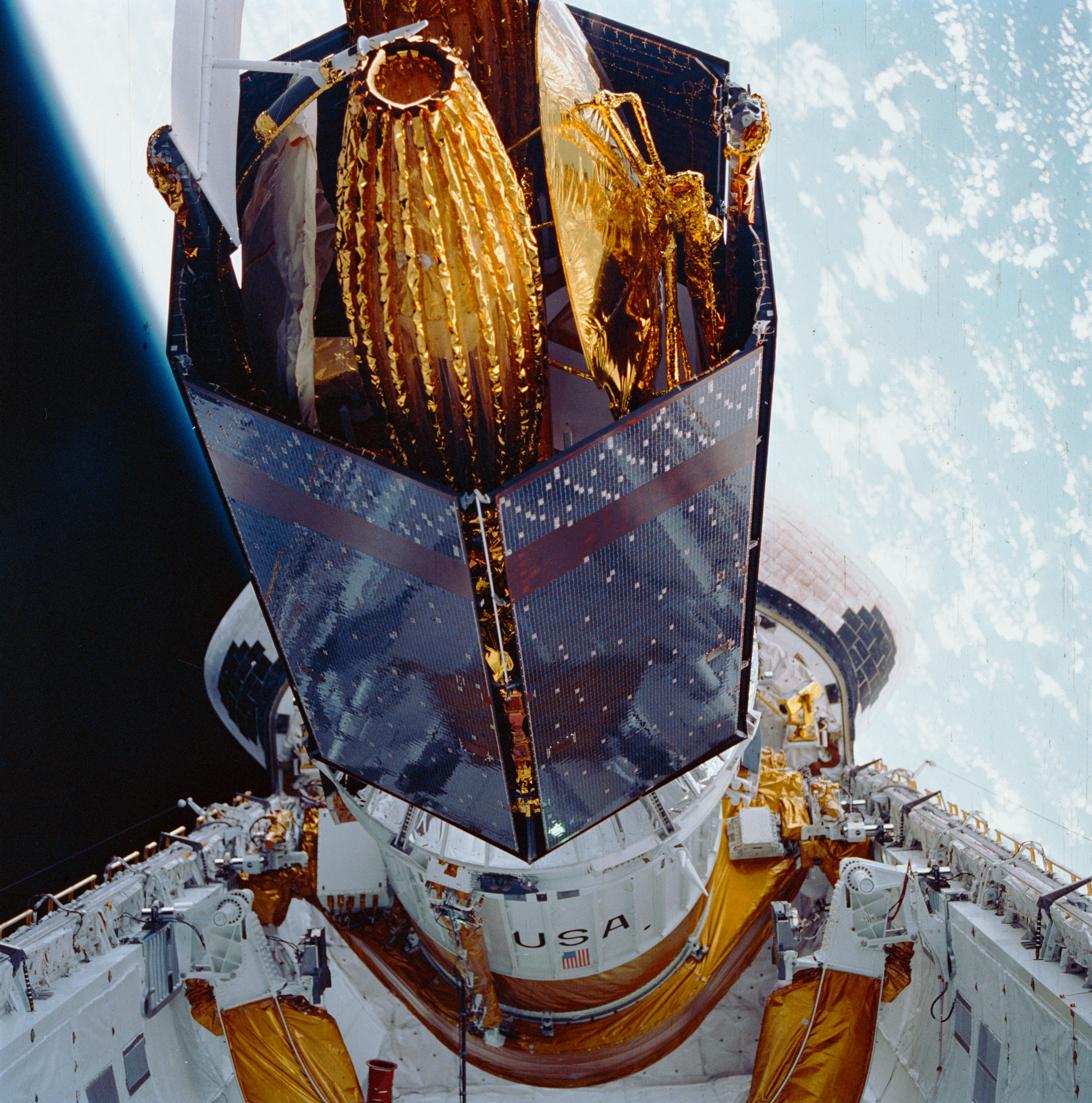
September 29: The TDRS is prepared for deployment.

- September 5 – With the US's largest thrift institution, American Savings and Loan Association, entering receivership, the Robert M. Bass Group (headed by Robert Bass) agrees to buy its good assets with US$1.7 billion in federal aid (completed December).
- September 15 – Nicholas F. Brady is sworn in as the new Secretary of Treasury, succeeding James Baker.
- September 17–October 2 – The United States participates in the 1988 Summer Olympics in Seoul, South Korea and ranks in third place, bringing home 36 gold, 31 silver and 27 bronze medals for a total of 94 medals behind the Soviet Union in first place and East Germany in second.
- September 25 – Jim Lehrer hosts the first presidential debate between Michael Dukakis and Vice President Bush at Wake Forest University.
- September 29 – STS-26: NASA resumes Space Shuttle flights, grounded after the 1986 Space Shuttle Challenger disaster, with Space Shuttle Discovery going back into orbit and deploying the TDRS-3 satellite, putting the US back into the Space Race.

=== October ===
- October 3 – STS-26 lands at Edwards Air Force Base in California after four days of its successful maiden flight and satellite deployment.
- October 5 – In Omaha, Nebraska, in the only vice presidential debate of the 1988 U.S. presidential election, the Republican vice presidential nominee, Senator Dan Quayle of Indiana, insists he has as much experience in government as John F. Kennedy did when he sought the presidency in 1960. His Democratic opponent, Senator Lloyd Bentsen of Texas, replies, "Senator, I knew Jack Kennedy. I served with Jack Kennedy. Jack Kennedy was a friend of mine. Senator, you're no Jack Kennedy." The audience response to Senator Bentsen's remark is overwhelmingly positive.
- October 13 – In the second U.S. presidential debate, held at U.C.L.A., the Democratic Party nominee, Michael Dukakis, is asked by journalist Bernard Shaw of CNN if he would support the death penalty if his wife, "Kitty", were to be raped and murdered. Gov. Dukakis' reply, voicing his opposition to capital punishment in any and all circumstances, is later said to have been a major reason for the eventual failure of his campaign for the White House.
- October 15 – Kirk Gibson hits a dramatic home run to win Game 1 of the World Series for the Los Angeles Dodgers, over the Oakland Athletics, by a score of 5–4.
- October 20 – The Los Angeles Dodgers defeat the Oakland Athletics, 4 games to 1, to win their 6th World Series Title.
- October 25 - Ronald Reagan signs a bill, converting the Veterans Administration into the Cabinet-level US Department of Veterans Affairs; this would come into effect on March 15, 1989.
- October 27 – Ronald Reagan decides to tear down the new U.S. Embassy in Moscow because of Soviet listening devices in the building structure.
- October 30 – Philip Morris buys Kraft Foods for US$13,100,000,000.
- October 31 – U.S. Territory American Samoa's National Park of American Samoa is established.

=== November ===
November 8: George H. W. Bush elected President

- Throughout the Month – The unemployment rate drops to 5.3%, the lowest level since May 1974.
- November 2 – The Morris worm, written by Robert Tappan Morris – the first computer worm distributed via the Internet – is launched from MIT.
- November 8 – 1988 United States presidential election:George H. W. Bush is elected president of the United States over Democratic opponent, Michael Dukakis.
- November 10 – The United States Air Force acknowledges the existence of the Lockheed F-117 Nighthawk in a Pentagon press conference.
- November 11 – In Sacramento, California, police find a body buried in the lawn of sixty-year-old landlady Dorothea Puente; six more bodies are eventually found. Puente is convicted of three murders, and sentenced to life in prison.
- November 13 – Mulugeta Seraw, an Ethiopian law student in Portland, Oregon, is beaten to death by members of the Neo-Nazi group East Side White Pride.
- November 15 – The 300-foot Green Bank Telescope collapses in Green Bank, West Virginia.
- November 18
  - War on drugs: U.S. President Ronald Reagan signs a bill permitting the death penalty for drug traffickers involved in killings.
- November 21 – Ted Turner officially buys Jim Crockett Promotions, known as NWA Crockett, and turns it into World Championship Wrestling (WCW).
- November 22 – In Palmdale, California, the first prototype B-2 Spirit stealth bomber is revealed.
- November 30 – Kohlberg Kravis Roberts & Co. buys RJR Nabisco for US$25,000,700,000 in the biggest leveraged buyout deal of all time.

=== December ===
- December 1 – The first World AIDS Day is observed.
- December 9 – The last Dodge Aries and Plymouth Reliant roll off the assembly line in a Chrysler factory.
- December 12 – Soviet General Secretary Mikhail Gorbachev begins an official visit to the United States.
- December 14 – After Yasir Arafat renounces violence, the U.S. says it will open dialogue with the PLO.
- December 16 – Perennial U.S. Democratic presidential candidate Lyndon LaRouche is convicted of mail fraud.
- December 19 – Mikhail Gorbachev cuts short his visit to the United States and returns to the Soviet Union, as thousands of people have died in an earthquake in Armenia.
- December 21
  - Pan Am Flight 103 is destroyed by a bomb over Lockerbie, Scotland, United Kingdom; the bombing killed a total of 270 people, including 178 U.S. citizens.
  - Drexel Burnham Lambert agrees to plead guilty to insider trading and other violations and pay penalties of US$650 million.

=== Undated ===
- The U.S. Drought of 1988 causes extensive crop damage in many parts of the United States, causing around $60 billion in damage. Multiple regions suffer in the conditions. Heat waves cause 4,800 to 17,000 excess deaths, while scorching many areas of the United States during the summer 1988.

=== Ongoing ===
- Cold War (1947–1991)

== Births ==
=== January ===
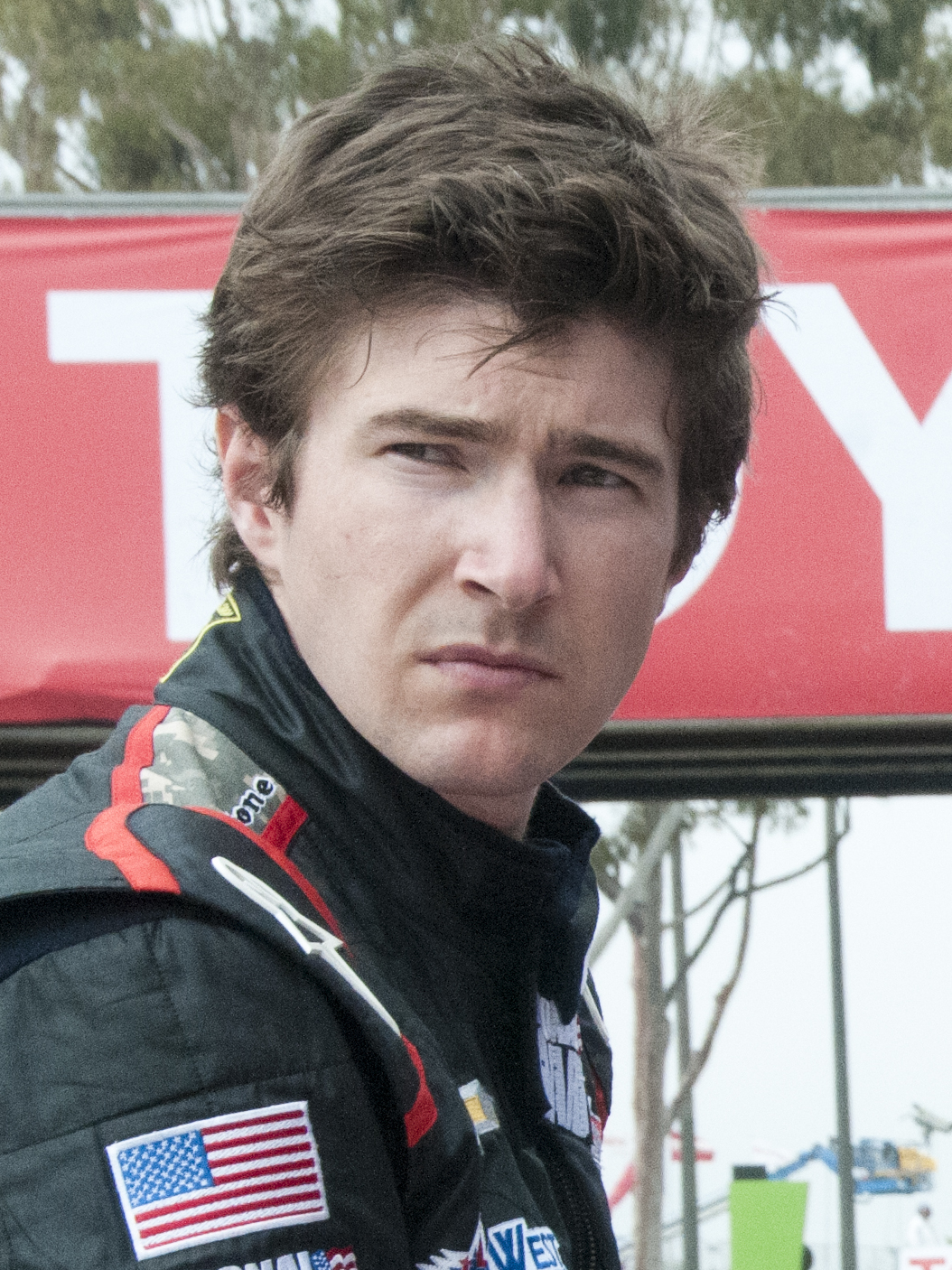
J. R. Hildebrand

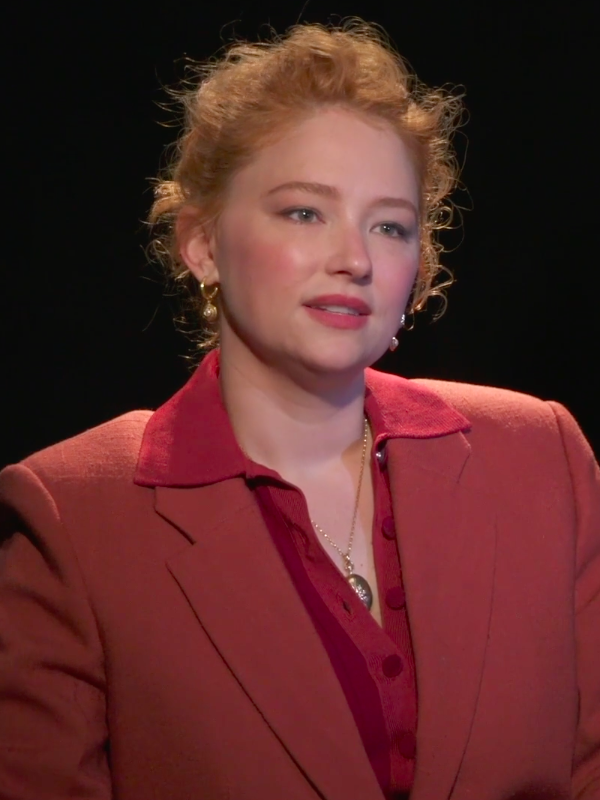
Haley Bennett

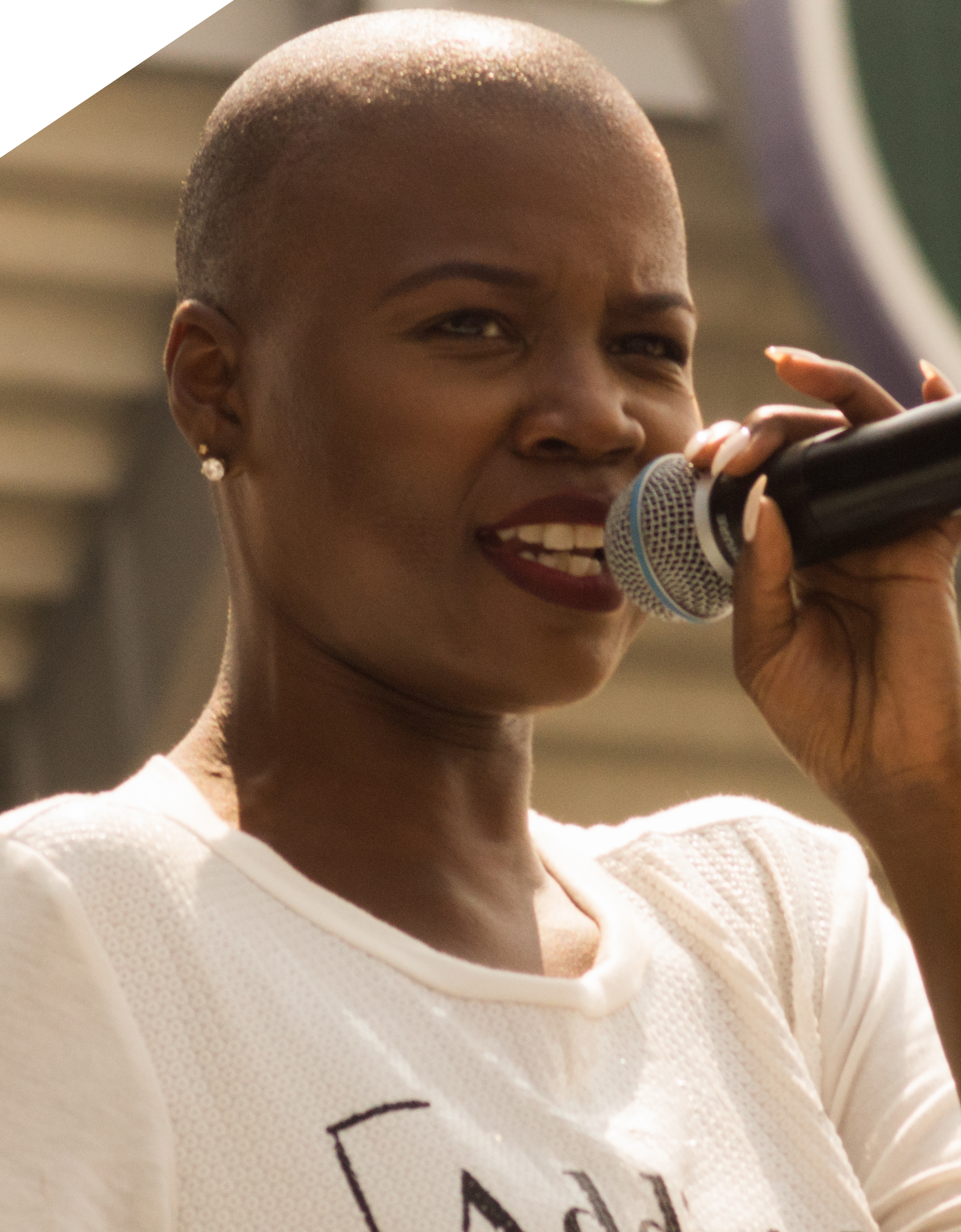
V. Bozeman

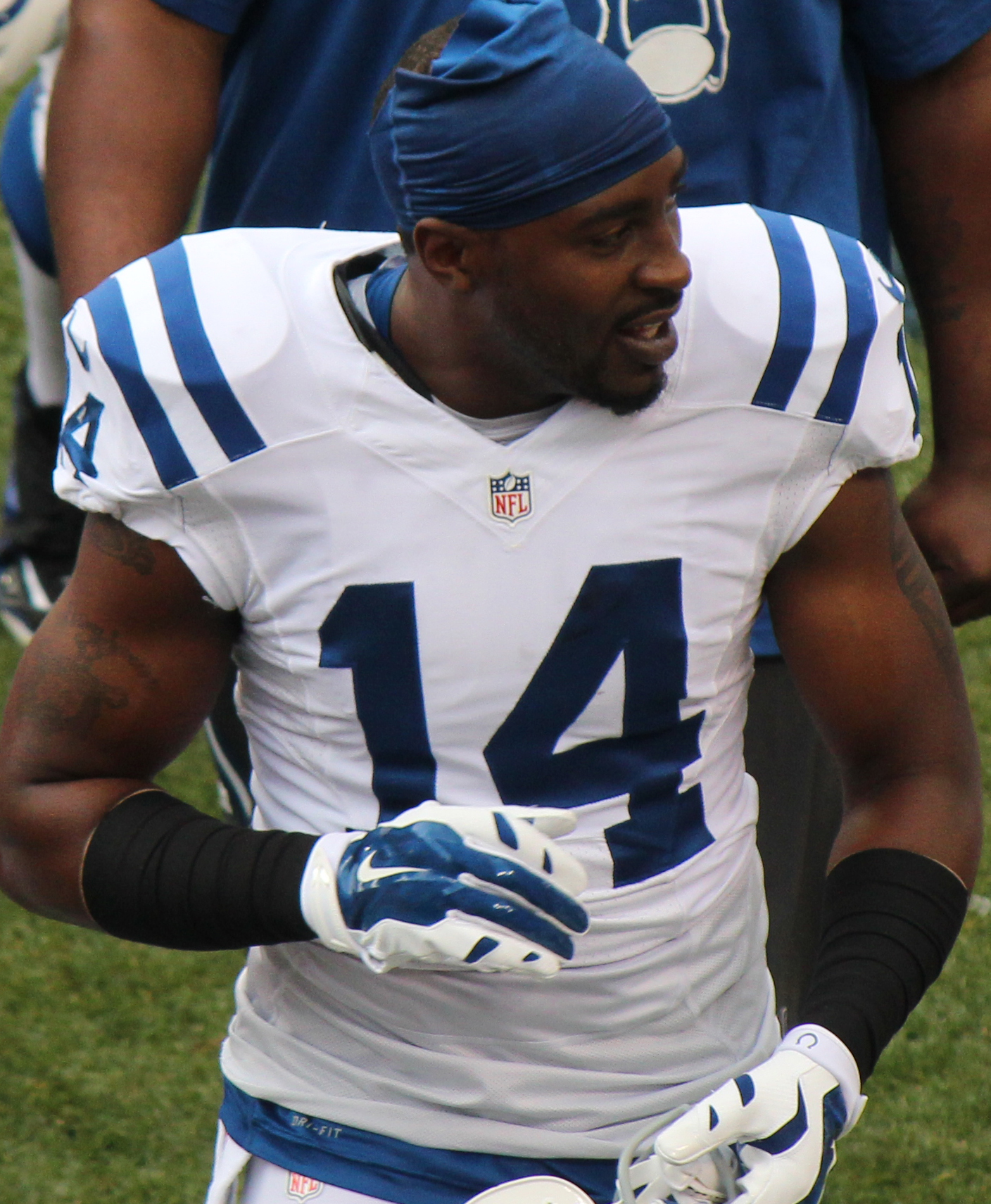
Hakeem Nicks

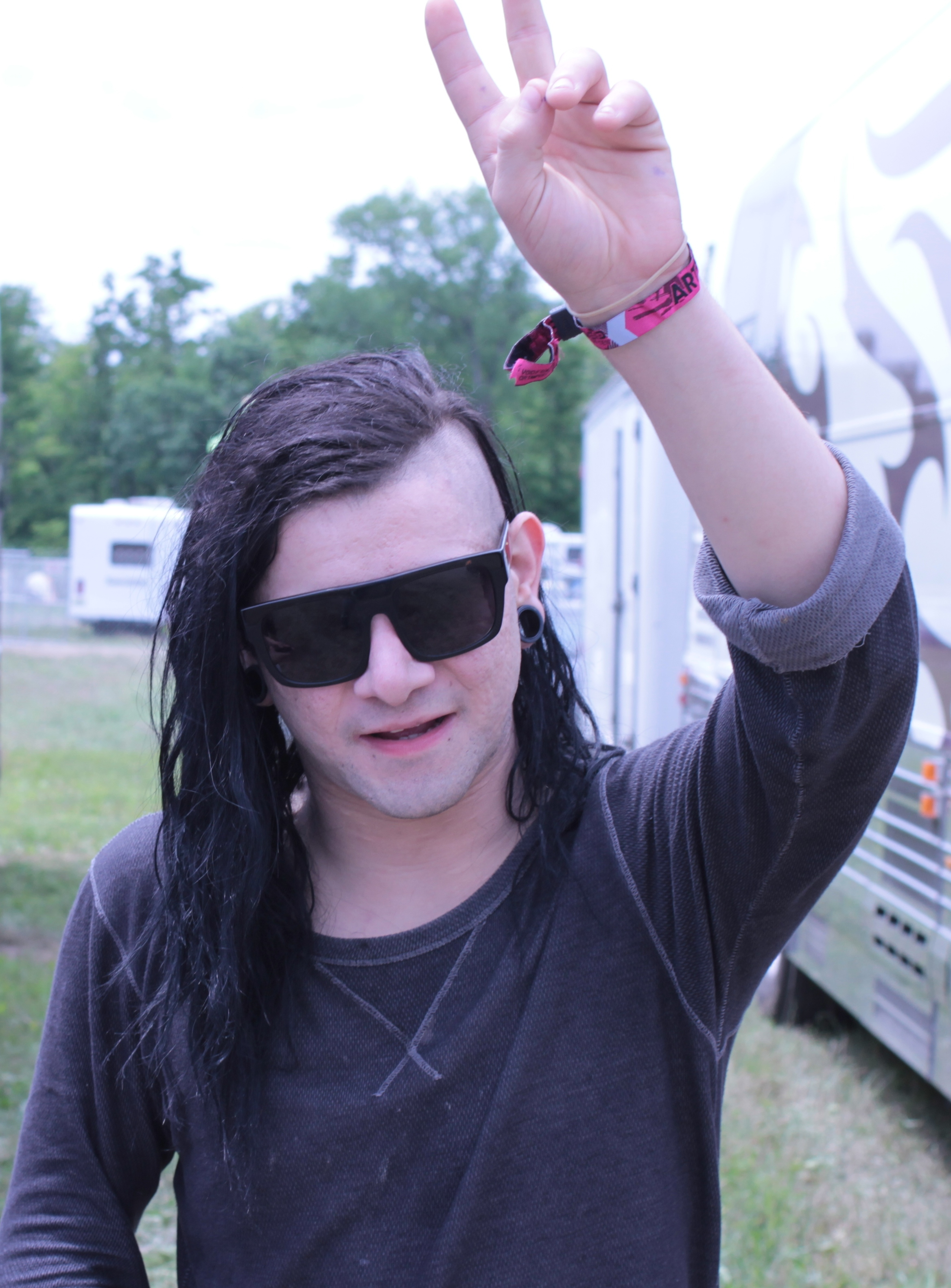
Skrillex

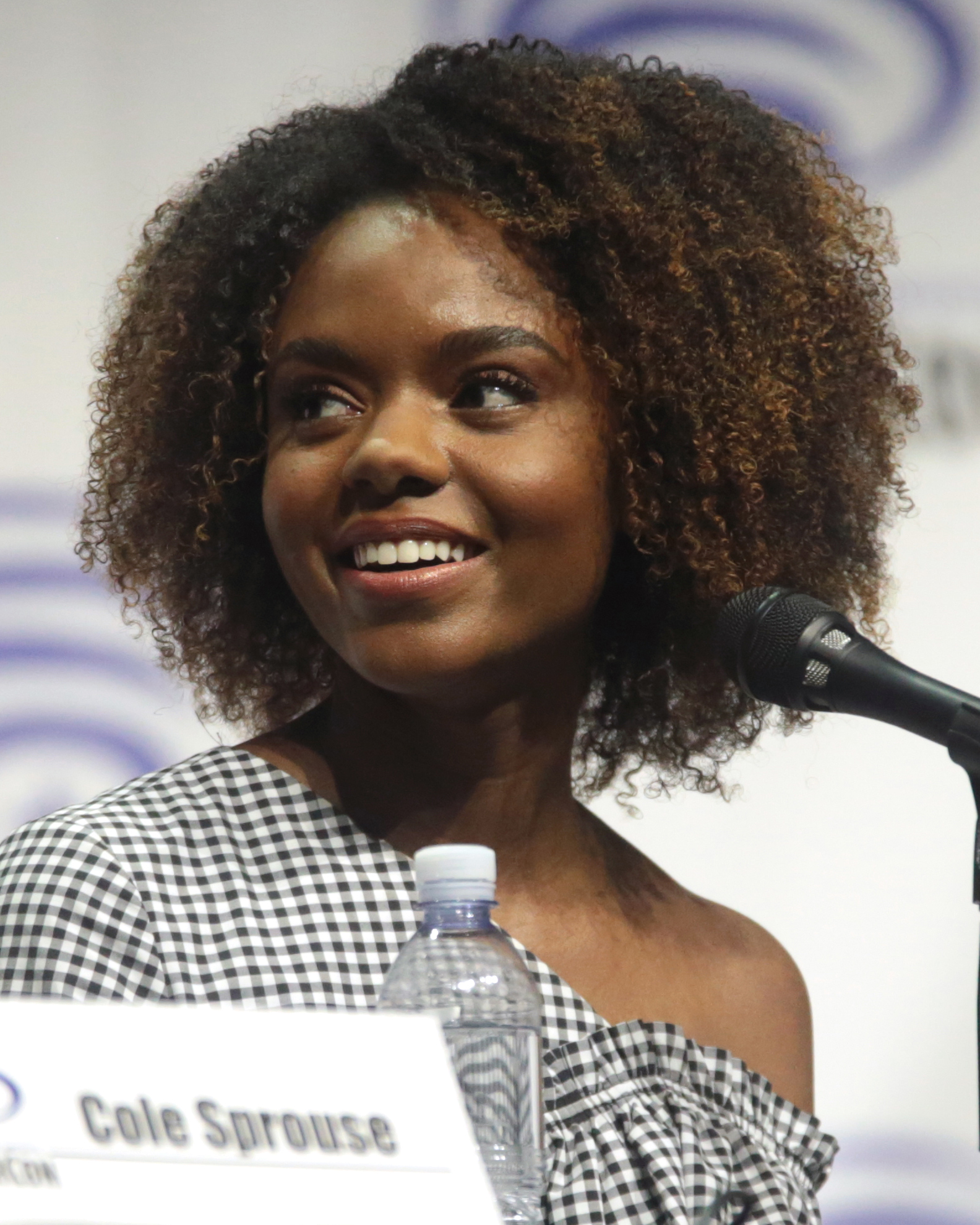
Ashleigh Murray

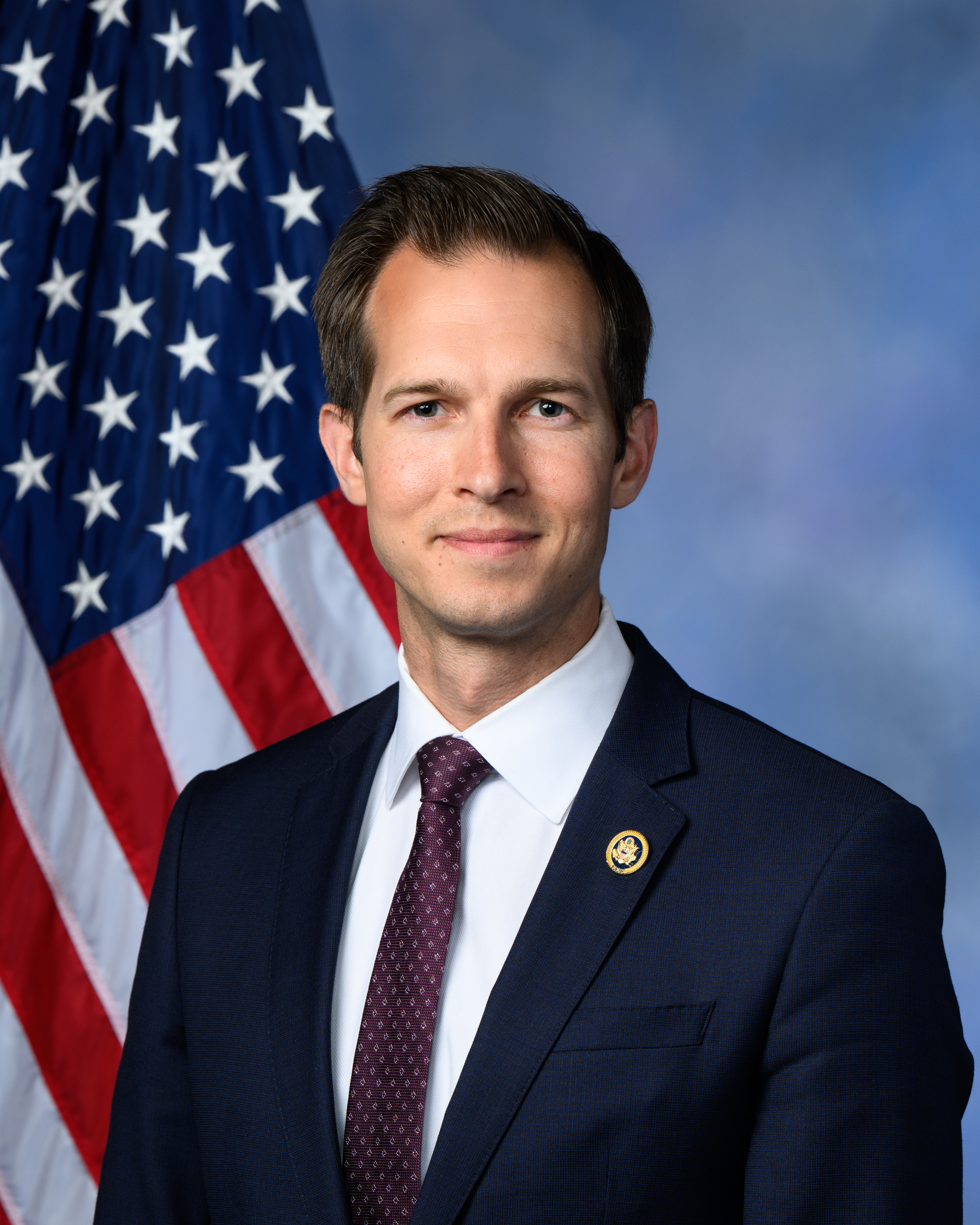
Jake Auchincloss

- January 1
  - Eddie Ababio, Ghanaian-born soccer player
  - Zach Clayton, football player
  - Dallas Keuchel, baseball player
- January 2
  - Aaron Barrett, baseball player
  - Mandy Harvey, jazz and pop singer
- January 3 – J. R. Hildebrand, racing driver
- January 4
  - Azad Al-Barazi, Syrian-born Olympic swimmer
  - Corbin Bryant, football player
  - John Clay, football player
- January 5 – Charlie Campbell, soccer player
- January 6 – Roger Bothe, soccer player
- January 7
  - 1788-L, DJ and electronic music producer
  - Haley Bennett, actress and singer
  - Jhoulys Chacín, Venezuelan-born baseball player
- January 8
  - Angel Faith, singer, dancer, and psychologist
  - Allison Harvard, model
  - Lily Nicksay, actress
  - Alex Tyus, American-born Israeli basketball player
- January 9
  - V. Bozeman, singer and actress
  - Mike Champa, singer, rapper, musician, and frontman for For All Those Sleeping
  - Katherine Copely, American-born Lithuanian ice dancer
- January 11
  - Travon Bellamy, football player
  - Blair Brandt, political adviser
  - Joseph Collins, football player
- January 12
  - George Clanton, electronic musician and singer/songwriter
  - Andrew Lawrence, actor, singer, and director
- January 13 – Tatev Abrahamyan, Armenian-born chess grandmaster
- January 14
  - Cal Barnes, actor, director, screenwriter, producer, novelist, and playwright
  - Mikalah Gordon, singer
  - Hakeem Nicks, football player
- January 15
  - Skrillex, musician and DJ
  - Jessica Poland, singer/songwriter
- January 16 – Bull Dempsey, wrestler
- January 17
  - Matt Bouldin, basketball player
  - Earl Clark, basketball player
- January 18
  - Carlos Borja, soccer player
  - Ashleigh Murray, actress and singer
- January 19
  - Kyle Adams, football player
  - Allison Aldrich, Paralympic volleyball player
  - Beedie, rapper
  - Bonnie Brawner, Paralympic volleyball player
  - Kris Cooke, football player
  - JaVale McGee, basketball player
  - Wardlow, wrestler
- January 20
  - Corey Allmond, basketball player
  - Emanuel Cook, football player
- January 21
  - Preston Claiborne, baseball player
  - Ashton Eaton, Olympic decathlete
  - John Early, actor and comedian
  - Vanessa Hessler, American-born Italian model and actress
- January 22
  - Asher Allen, football player
  - Nick Palatas, actor
  - Xavier Silas, basketball player and coach
- January 23
  - Terrance Campbell, basketball player
  - Wil Carter, basketball player
- January 25
  - Da'Sean Butler, basketball player and coach
  - Jason Colwick, pole vaulter
- January 26
  - Dan Bailey, football player
  - Jack Combs, ice hockey player
- January 27 – Ashley Battersby, freestyle skier
- January 28
  - Pierce Brown, science fiction author
  - Alexandra Krosney, actress
  - Quentin Oliver Lee, actor and singer (d. 2022)
  - Yuriy Sardarov, Azerbaijani-born actor
- January 29
  - Alex Albright, football player
  - Jake Auchincloss, politician
  - Mike Bolsinger, baseball player
  - Cyntoia Brown, convicted murderer
  - Clifford Chapin, voice actor and director
  - Eugene Clifford, football player
  - Hank Conger, baseball player and coach
- January 30
  - Keshia Baker, Olympic sprinter
  - Josh Brent, football player
  - Ben Cosgrove, composer
  - Rob Pinkston, actor
- January 31
  - Vance Albitz, baseball player
  - Kyle Kulinski, political commentator

=== February ===
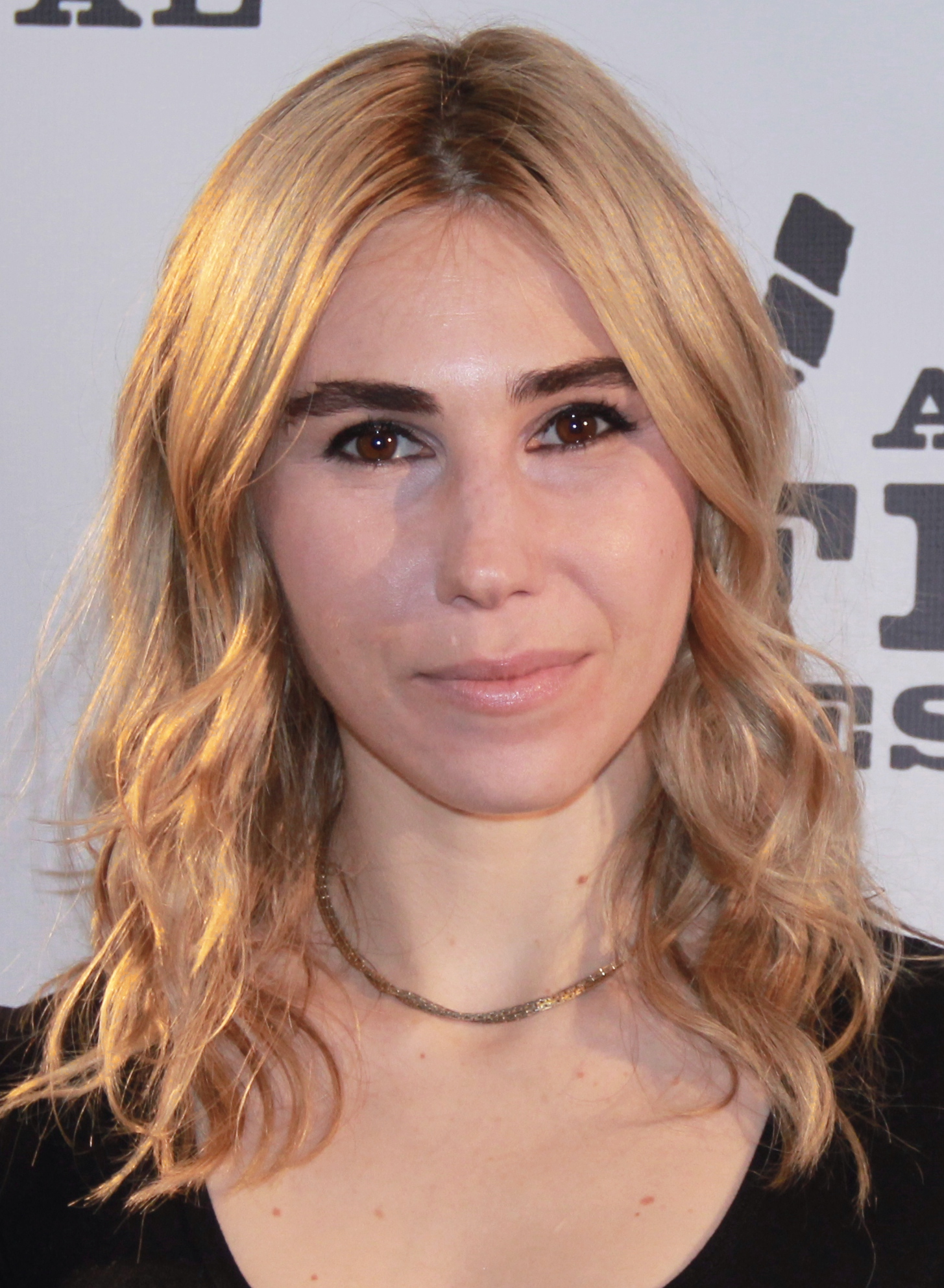
Zosia Mamet

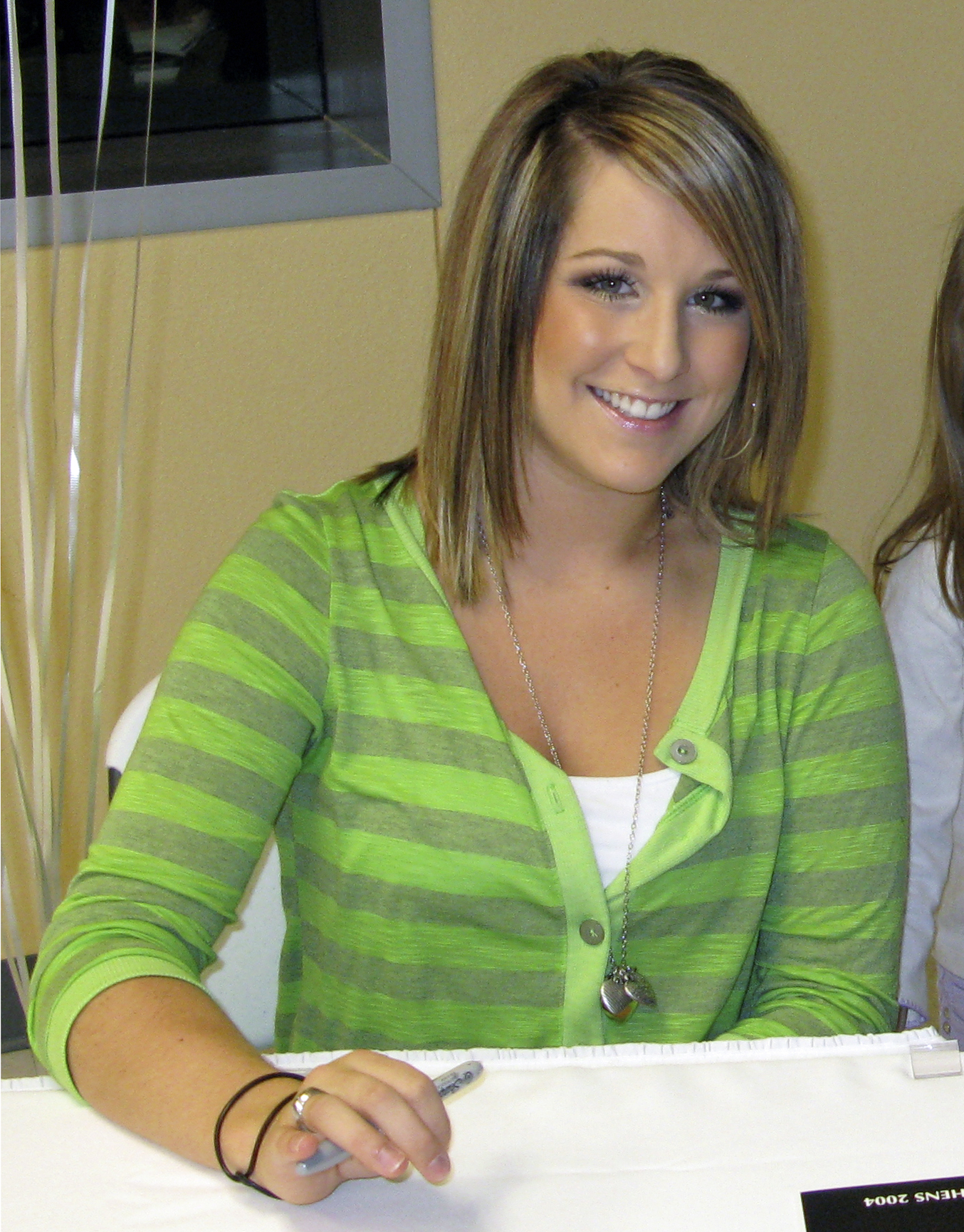
Carly Patterson

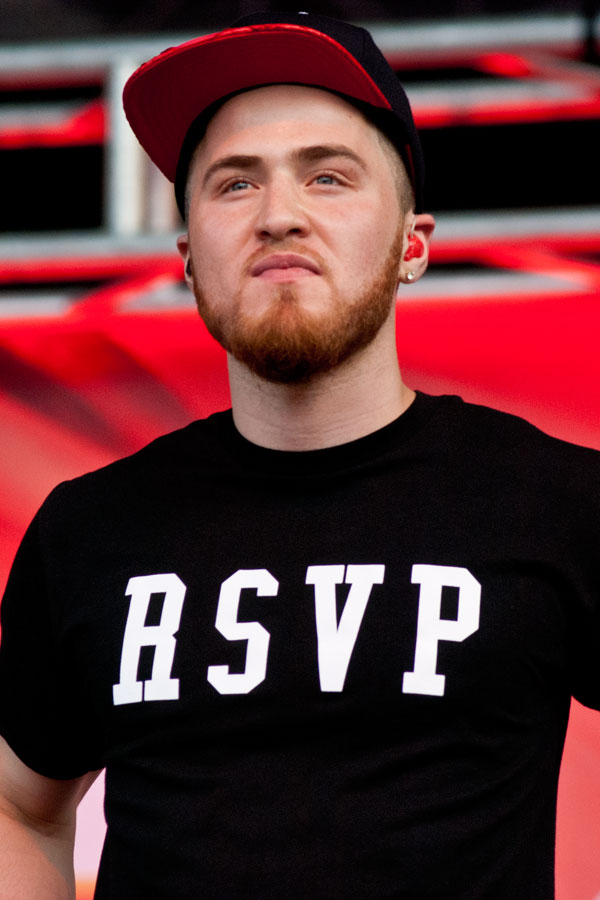
Mike Posner

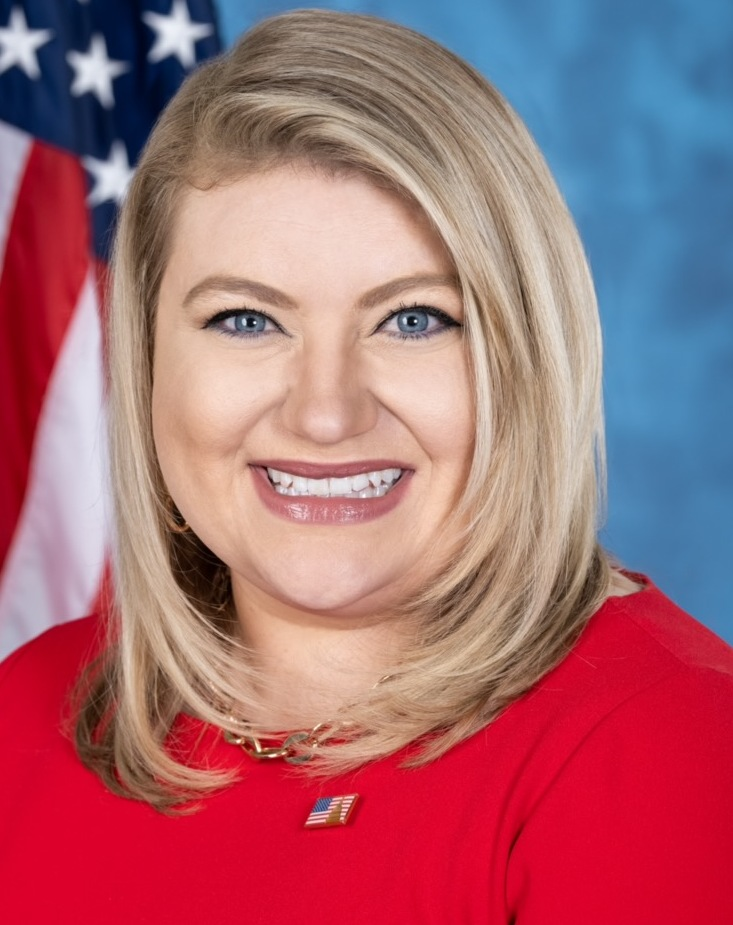
Kat Cammack

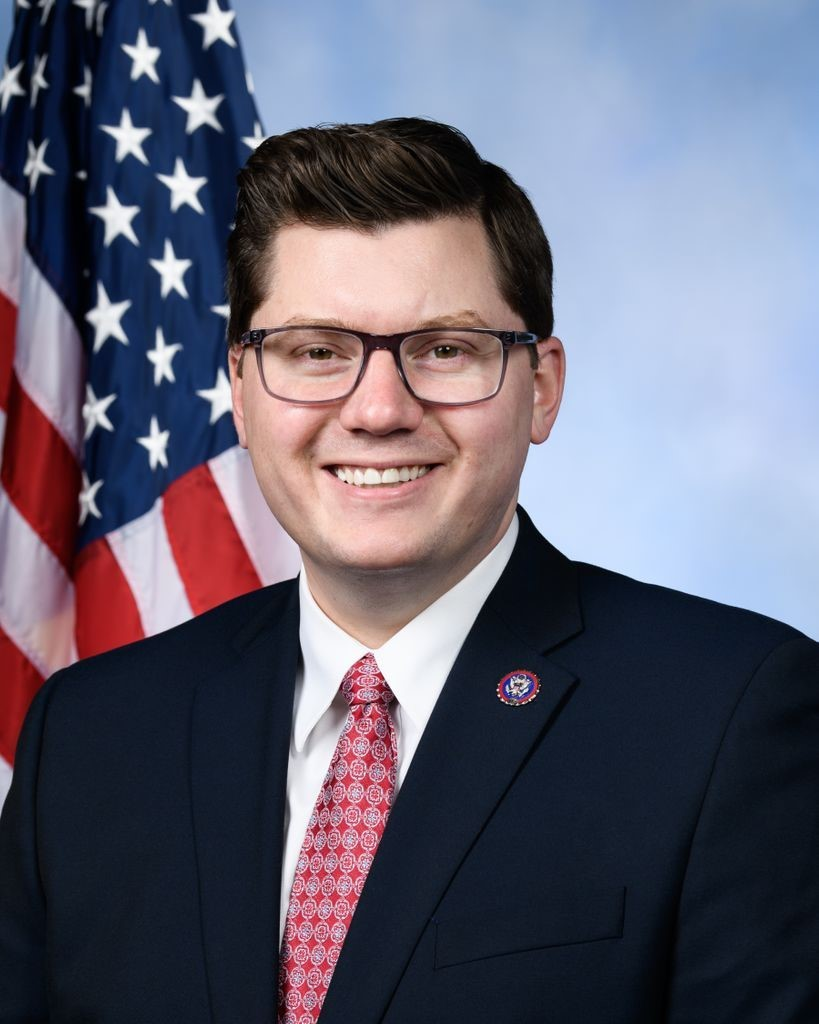
Jake LaTurner

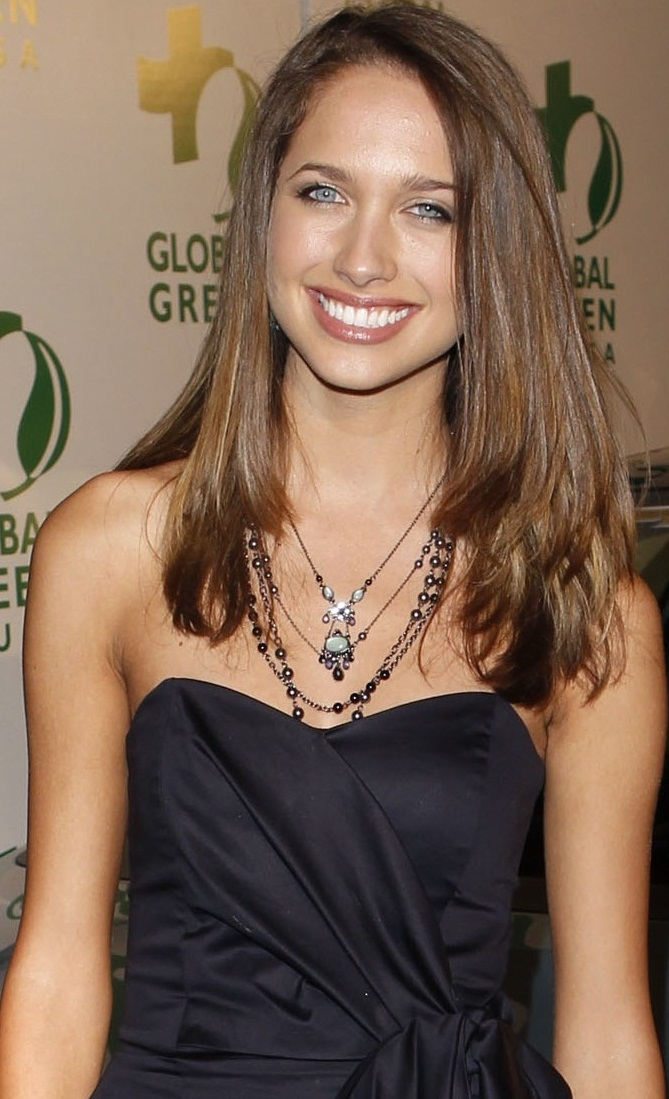
Maiara Walsh

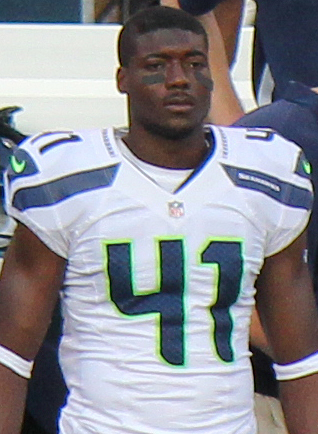
Byron Maxwell

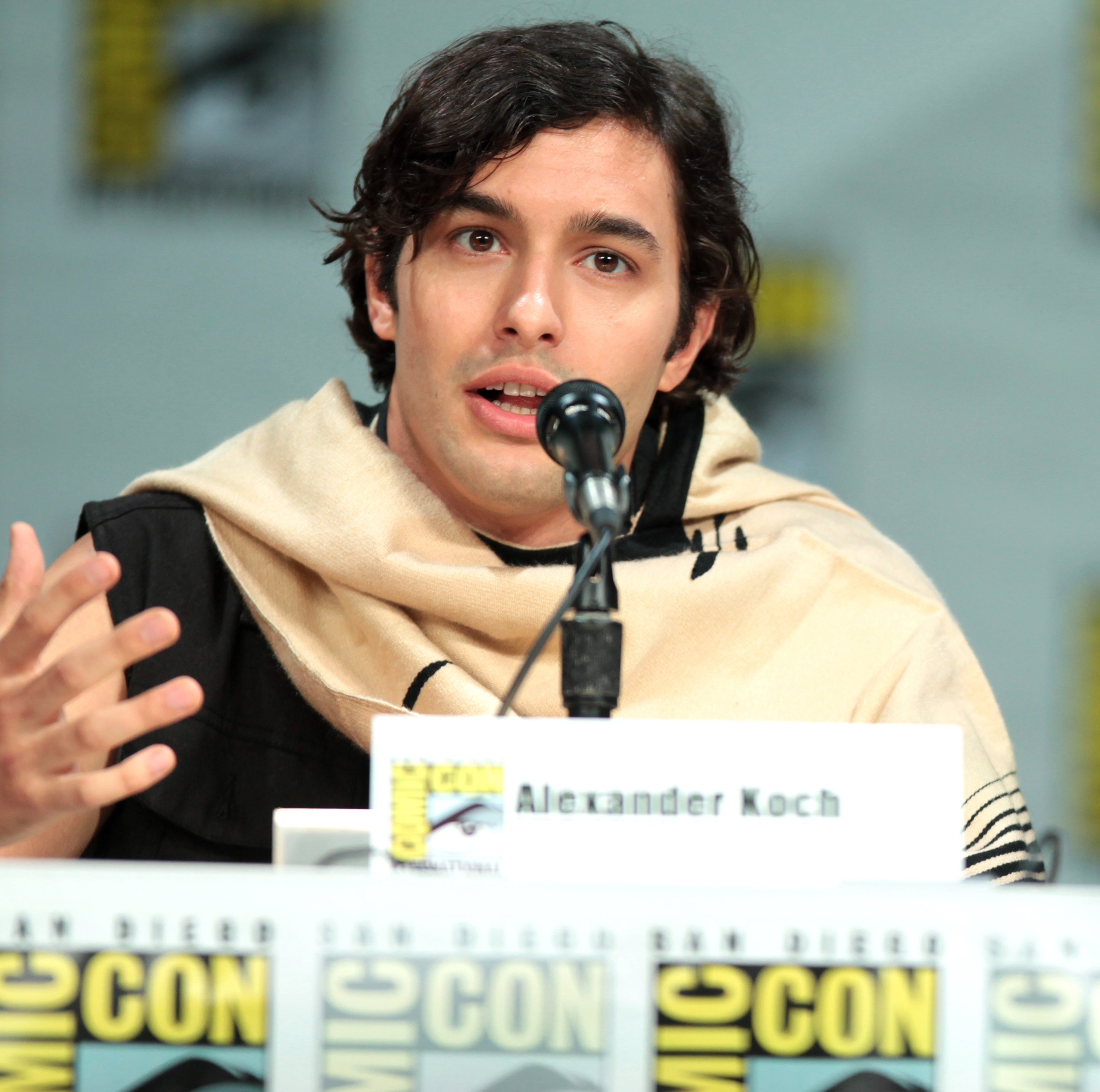
Alexander Koch

- February 1
  - Brett Anderson, baseball player
  - Ken Klippenstein, journalist
- February 2
  - Obi Ezeh, football player (d. 2024)
  - Zosia Mamet, actress
- February 3 – Justin Bonsignore, stock car racing driver
- February 4
  - Charlie Barnett, actor
  - Carly Patterson, Olympic gymnast
- February 5 – Katie Bell, Olympic diver
- February 6
  - David Boyd, Danish-born singer/songwriter and frontman for New Politics
  - Anna Diop, actress
  - Bailey Hanks, singer, actress and dancer
- February 7
  - Quintin Borders, football player
  - Matthew Stafford, football player
- February 8
  - Jahlil Beats, hip hop producer
  - Ryan Pinkston, actor and model
- February 9 – Donald Buckram, football player and coach
- February 10
  - Jake Brigham, baseball player
  - Marco Capozzoli, football player
- February 11 – Barry Church, football player
- February 12
  - DeMarco Murray, football player
  - Greta Morgan, singer/songwriter and pianist
  - Mike Posner, singer/songwriter and producer
- February 14
  - Rob Callaway, football player
  - Matt Campanale, ice hockey player
  - Paul Clemens, baseball player
  - Asia Nitollano, singer and dancer
- February 15
  - Brooke Abel, Olympic swimmer
  - Jade Buford, stock car racing driver
  - Caleb Clay, baseball player
- February 16
  - Neli A'asa, football player
  - Chris Butler, cyclist
  - Kat Cammack, politician
  - Steven Caple Jr., director, producer, and screenwriter
  - Jacquelyn Crowell, cyclist (d. 2018)
- February 17
  - Brian Burrows, Olympic sports shooter
  - Brian Jack, politician
  - Jake LaTurner, politician
  - Amber Skye Noyes, actress and singer
- February 18
  - Mason Brodine, football player
  - Shane Lyons, actor, chef, and restaurateur
  - Sarah Sutherland, actress
  - Maiara Walsh, Brazilian-born actress
- February 19
  - Xavier Brown, football player
  - Bruce Carter, football player
  - Kevin Chapman, baseball player
- February 20
  - Michelle Betos, soccer player
  - Tim Crabbe, American-born Italian baseball player
  - Kealoha Pilares, football player
- February 22
  - Dominic Alford, football player
  - Colby Covington, mixed martial artist
- February 23
  - Jessica Breland, basketball player
  - Clark Burckle, Olympic swimmer
  - Byron Maxwell, football player
- February 24
  - Devon Beitzel, basketball player
  - Brittany Bowe, Olympic speed skater
  - Alexander Koch, actor
- February 25
  - Nate Adcock, baseball player
  - Joevan Catron, basketball player
  - Gerald McCoy, football player
- February 26
  - Dustin Ackley, baseball player
  - Demetrius Andrade, boxer
  - Cornelius Brown, football player
  - Lindsay Burdette, tennis player
  - Brad Coleman, stock car racing driver
  - Brittnee Cooper, volleyball player
- February 28 – Aroldis Chapman, baseball player

=== March ===
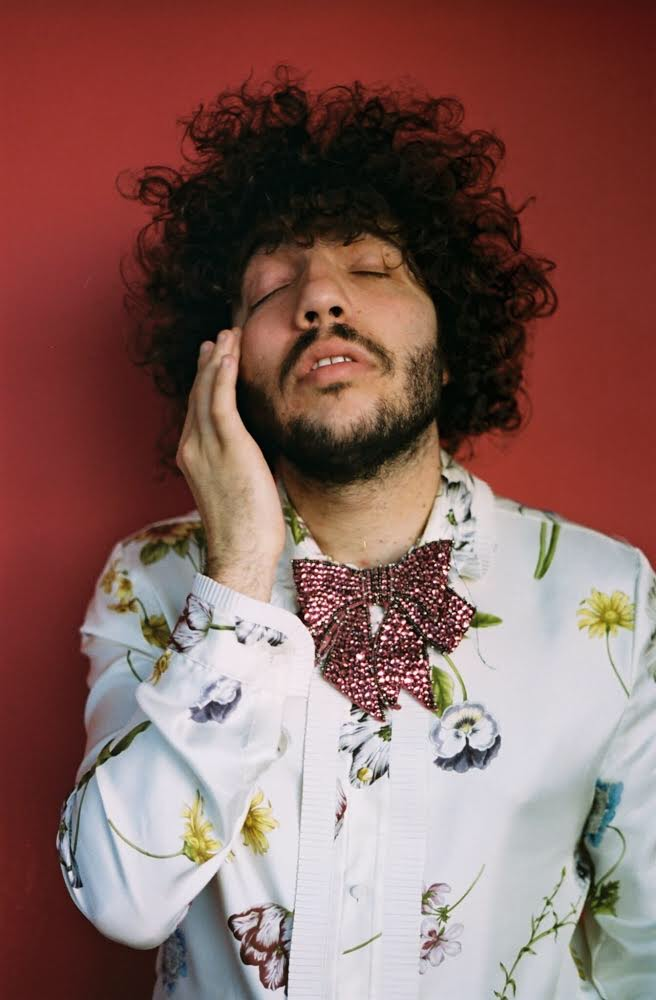
Benny Blanco

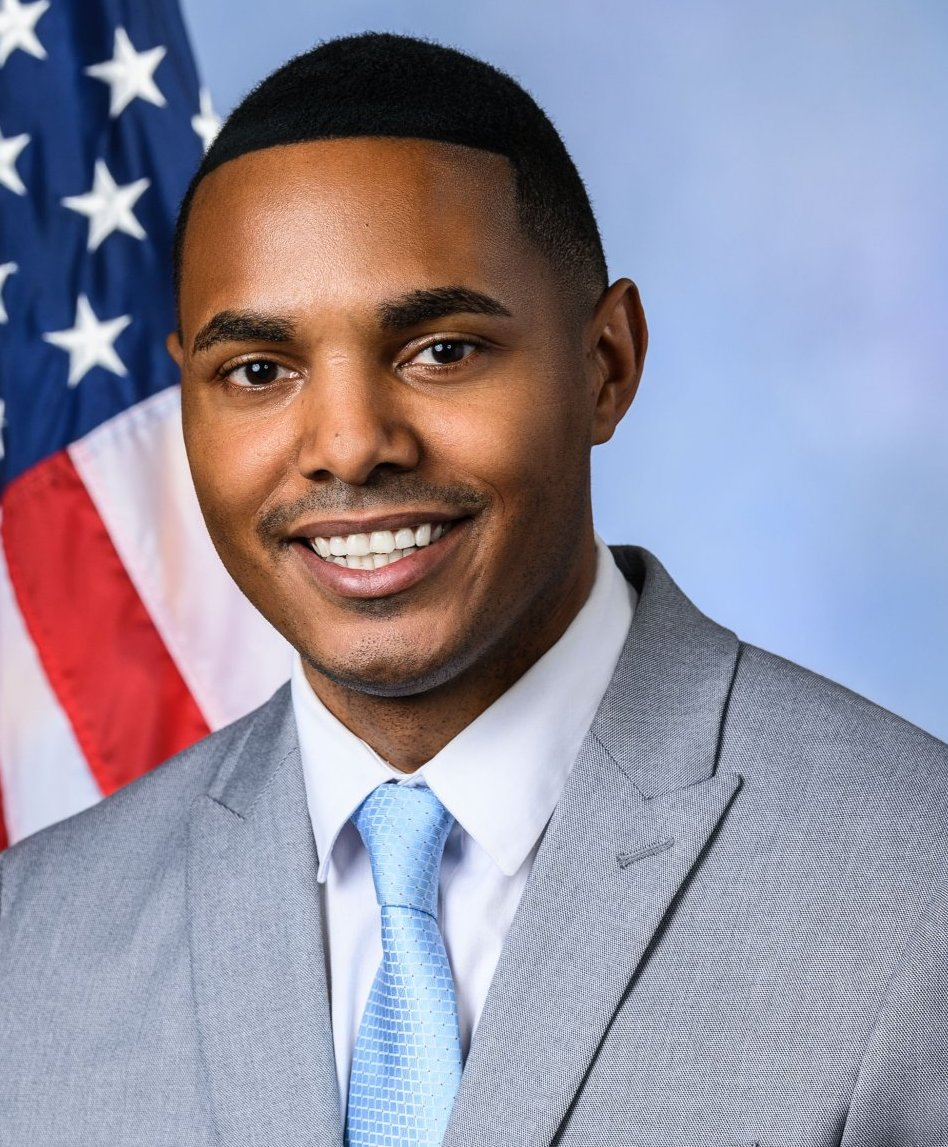
Ritchie Torres

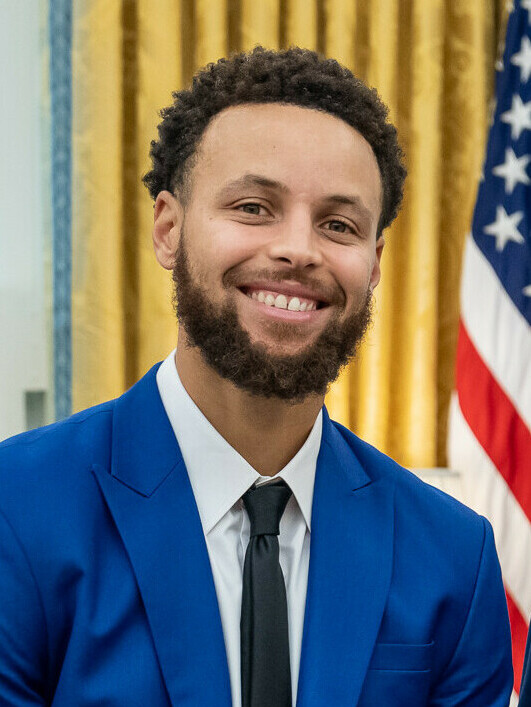
Stephen Curry

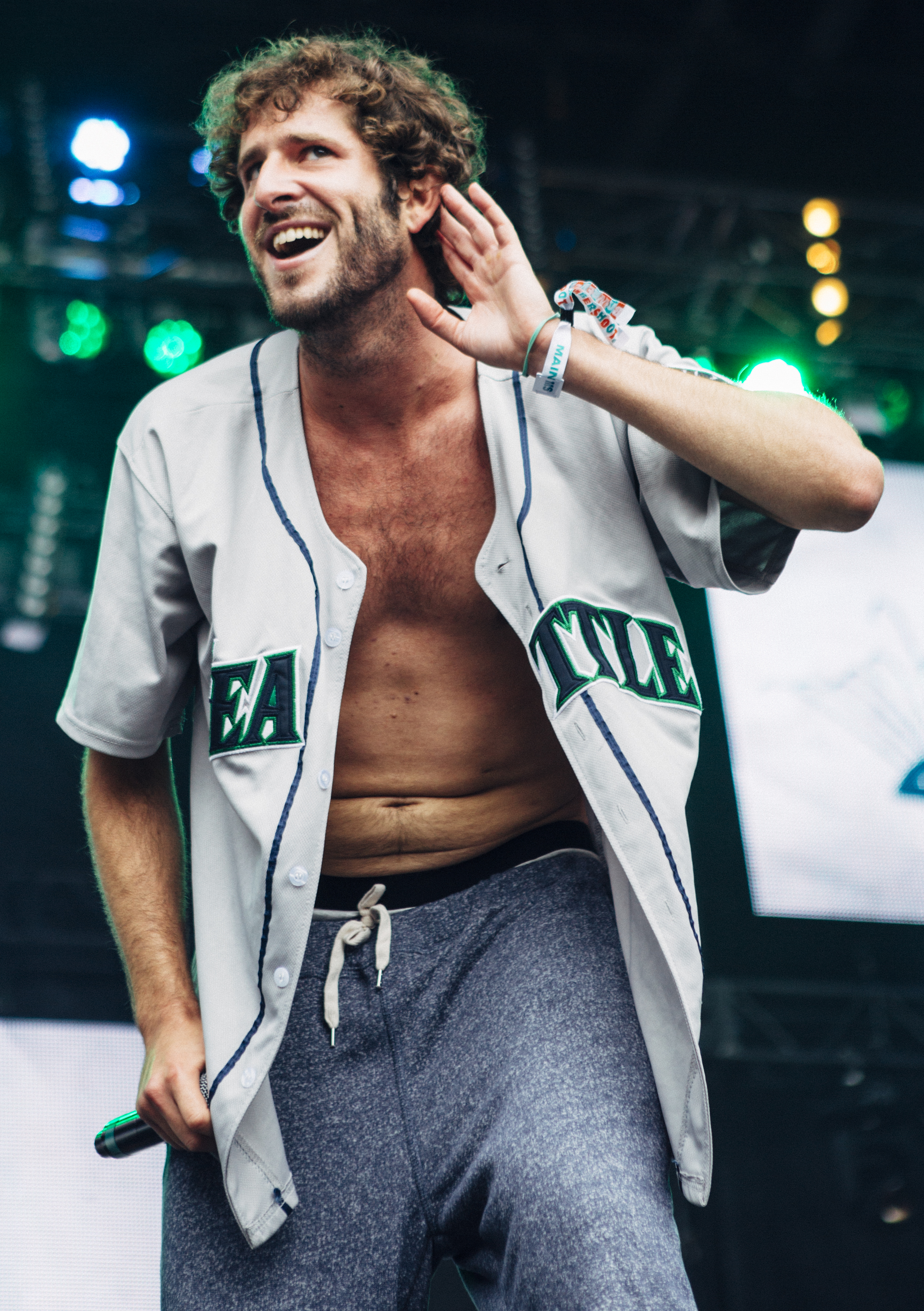
Lil Dicky

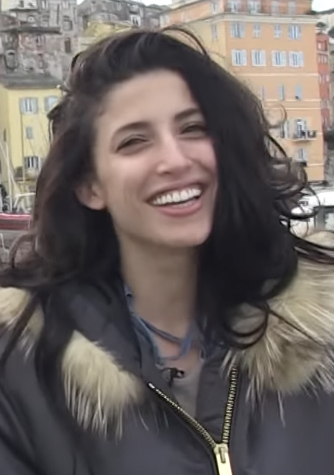
Tania Raymonde

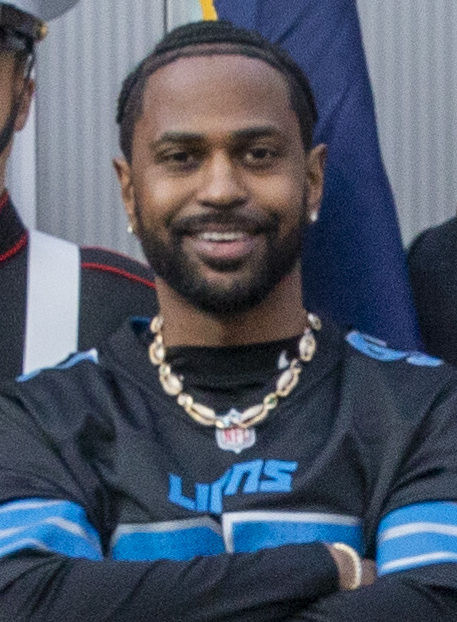
Big Sean

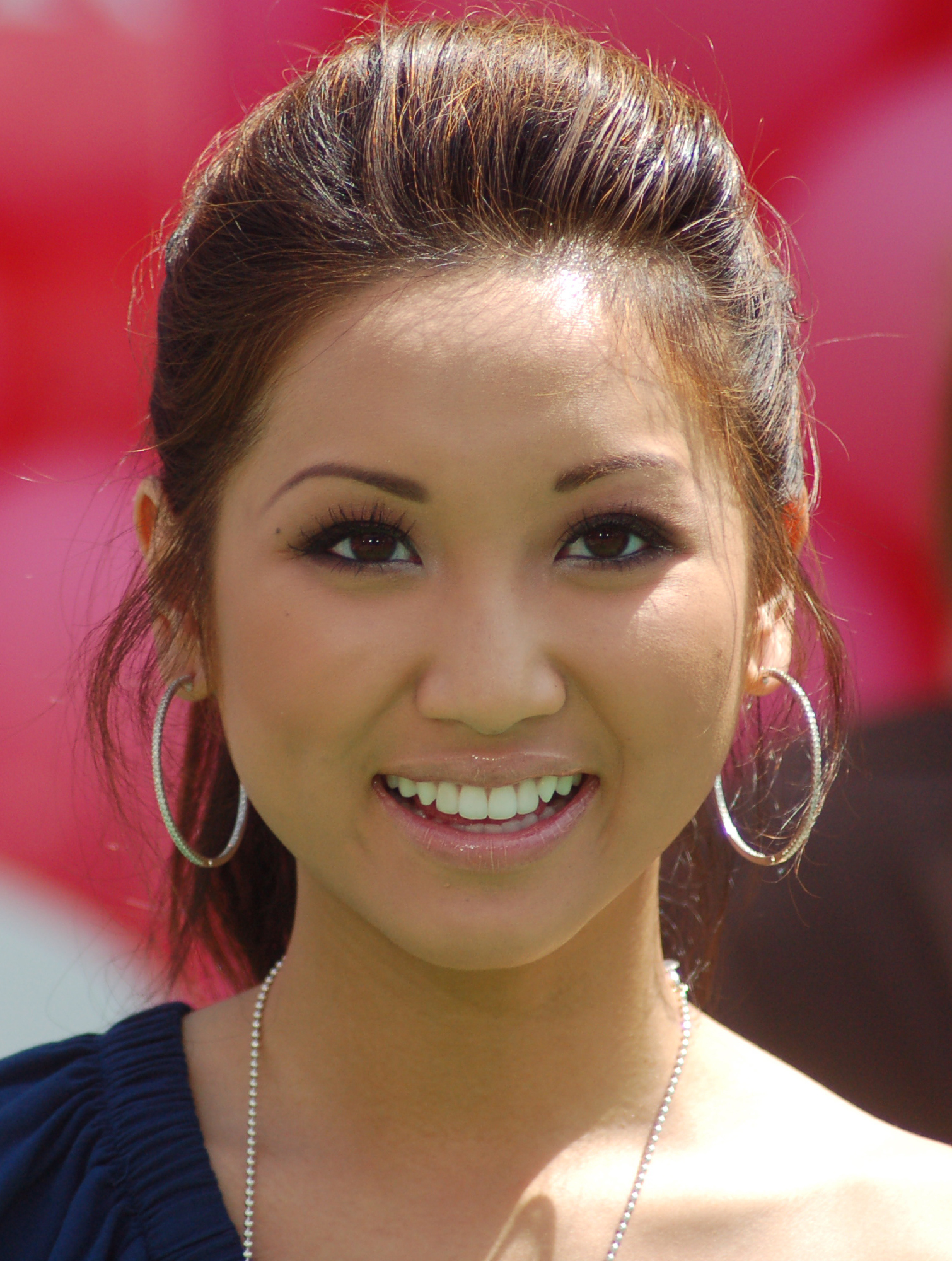
Brenda Song

- March 1
  - Whitney Allison, cyclist
  - Trevor Cahill, baseball player
  - Ben Casnocha, author, entrepreneur, and investor
  - Katija Pevec, actress
- March 2 – Laura Kaeppeler, beauty pageant titleholde, Miss America 2012
- March 3
  - Chad Burt, soccer player and coach
  - Josh Duggar, television personality
- March 4 – Cody Longo, actor and musician (d. 2023)
- March 5
  - Joe Benson, baseball player
  - Brent Brockman, soccer player
  - Eric Czerniewski, football player
- March 6 – Dailis Caballero, Cuban-born Olympic pole vaulter
- March 7
  - Larry Asante, football player
  - James Cleveland, football player
- March 8
  - Benny Blanco, musician, songwriter, and record producer
  - Kendrick Sampson, actor
- March 10
  - Ego Nwodim, actress and comedian
  - Danny McCray, football player and television personality
- March 11 – Vince Belnome, baseball player
- March 12
  - Zahir Carrington, basketball player
  - Ritchie Torres, politician
- March 14
  - Stephen Curry, basketball player
  - Sasha Grey, actress and model
  - Josh Stinson, baseball player
- March 15
  - Steve Ames, baseball player
  - Lil Dicky, rapper and comedian
- March 16 – Jhené Aiko, singer/songwriter
- March 17 – Tyler Bellamy, soccer player
- March 18
  - Chase Baird, saxophonist and composer
  - Vanessa Borne, wrestler
- March 19
  - Clayton Kershaw, baseball player
  - Freddie Smith, actor
- March 20
  - Kevin Cone, football player
  - Louie Vito, American-born Italian Olympic snowboarder
- March 21
  - Austin Adamec, Christian musician
  - Erik Johnson, ice hockey player
- March 22 – Tania Raymonde, actress
- March 23
  - Dellin Betances, baseball player
  - Matthew Justice, wrestler
- March 24
  - Felicia Chester, basketball player
  - Nick Lashaway, actor (d. 2016)
- March 25
  - Darrell Arthur, basketball player
  - Big Sean, rapper
  - Ryan Lewis, musician
- March 26 – Michael Buttacavoli, golfer
- March 27 – Brenda Song, actress
- March 28
  - Austin Armacost, television personality
  - Geno Atkins, football player
  - Jordan Bridges, politician
  - Ryan Kalish, baseball player
- March 29
  - Elle Anderson, cyclist
  - Kelly Sweet, singer
- March 30
  - Capri Anderson, pornographic actress
  - Richard Sherman, football player
- March 31 – DeAndre Liggins, baseball player

=== April ===
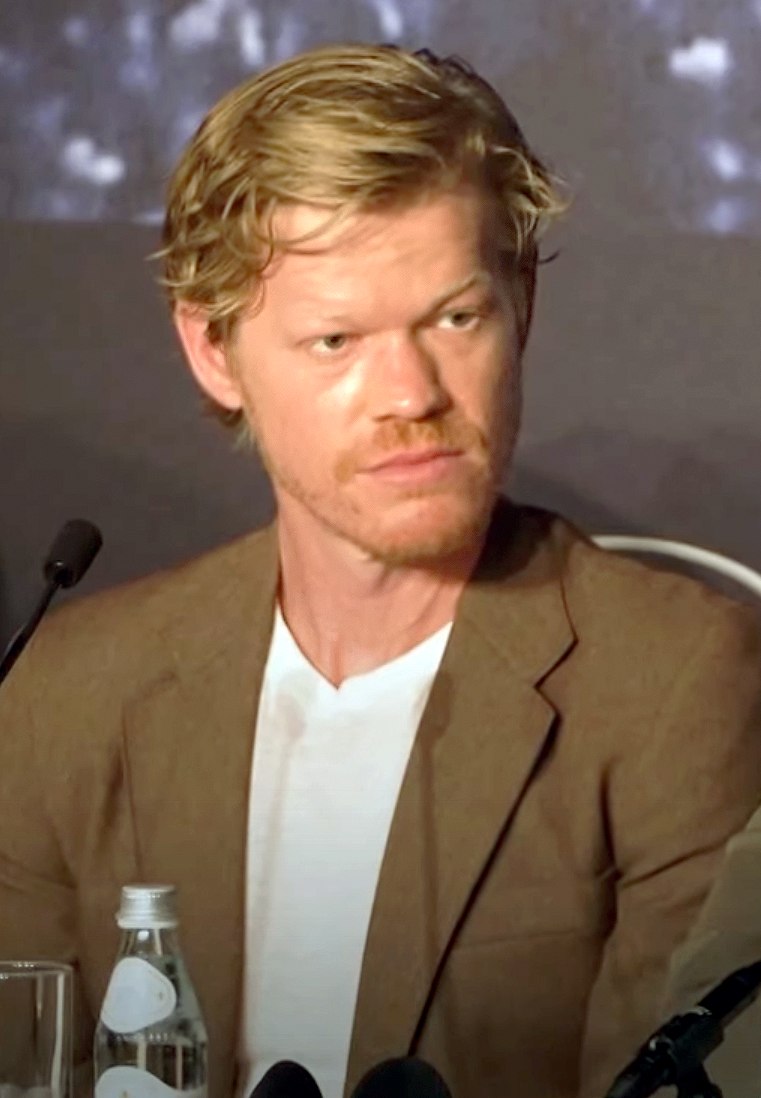
Jesse Plemons

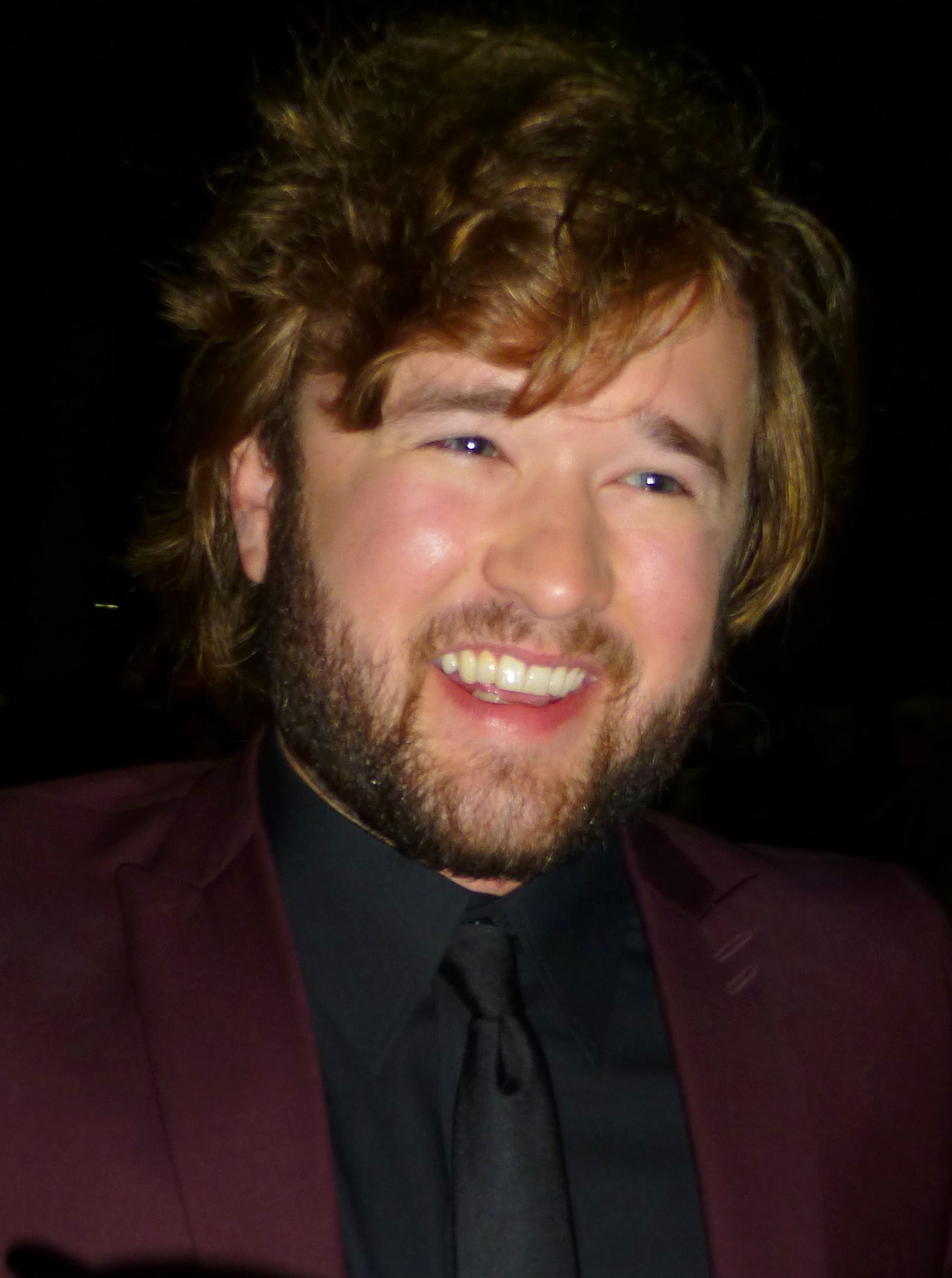
Haley Joel Osment

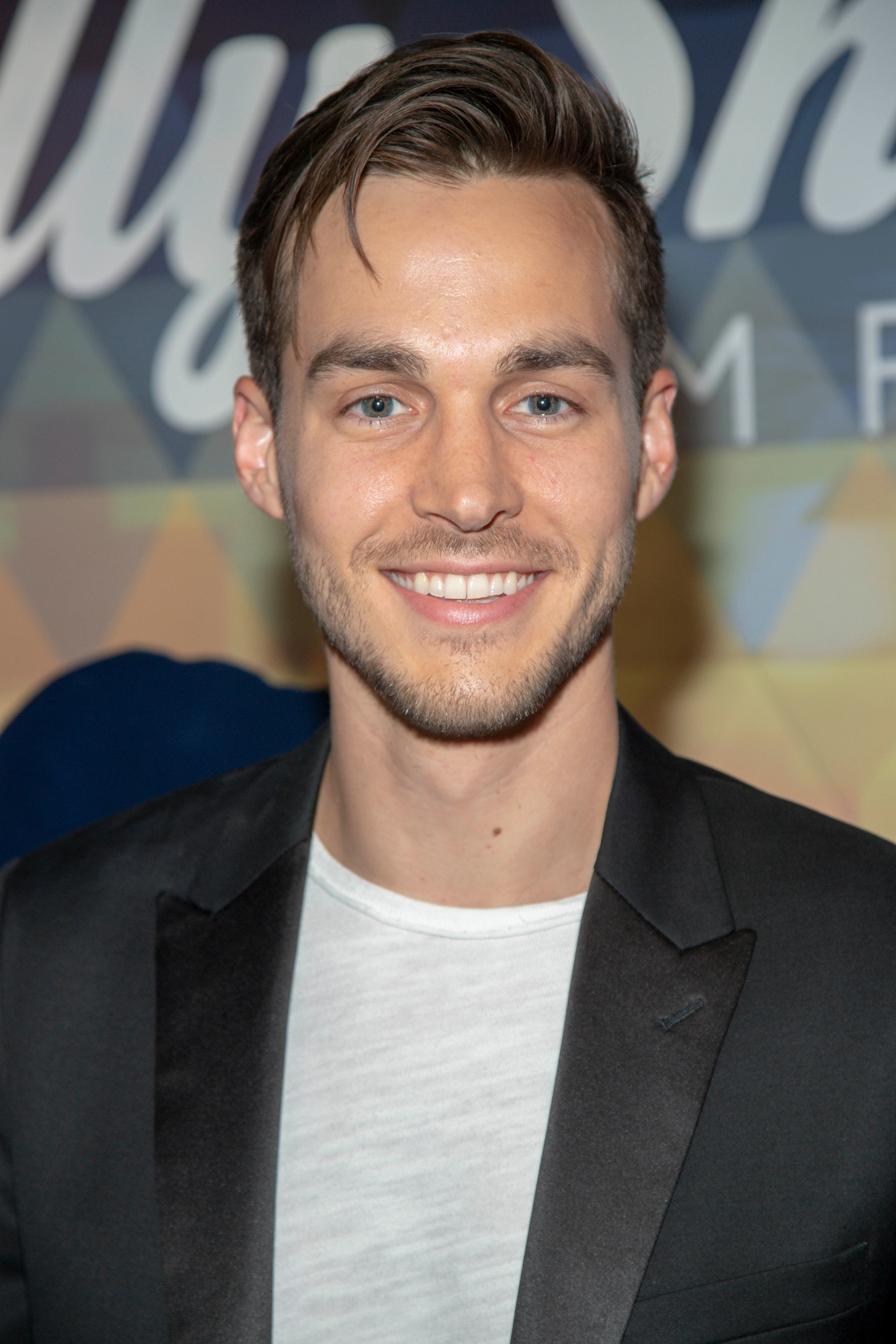
Chris Wood

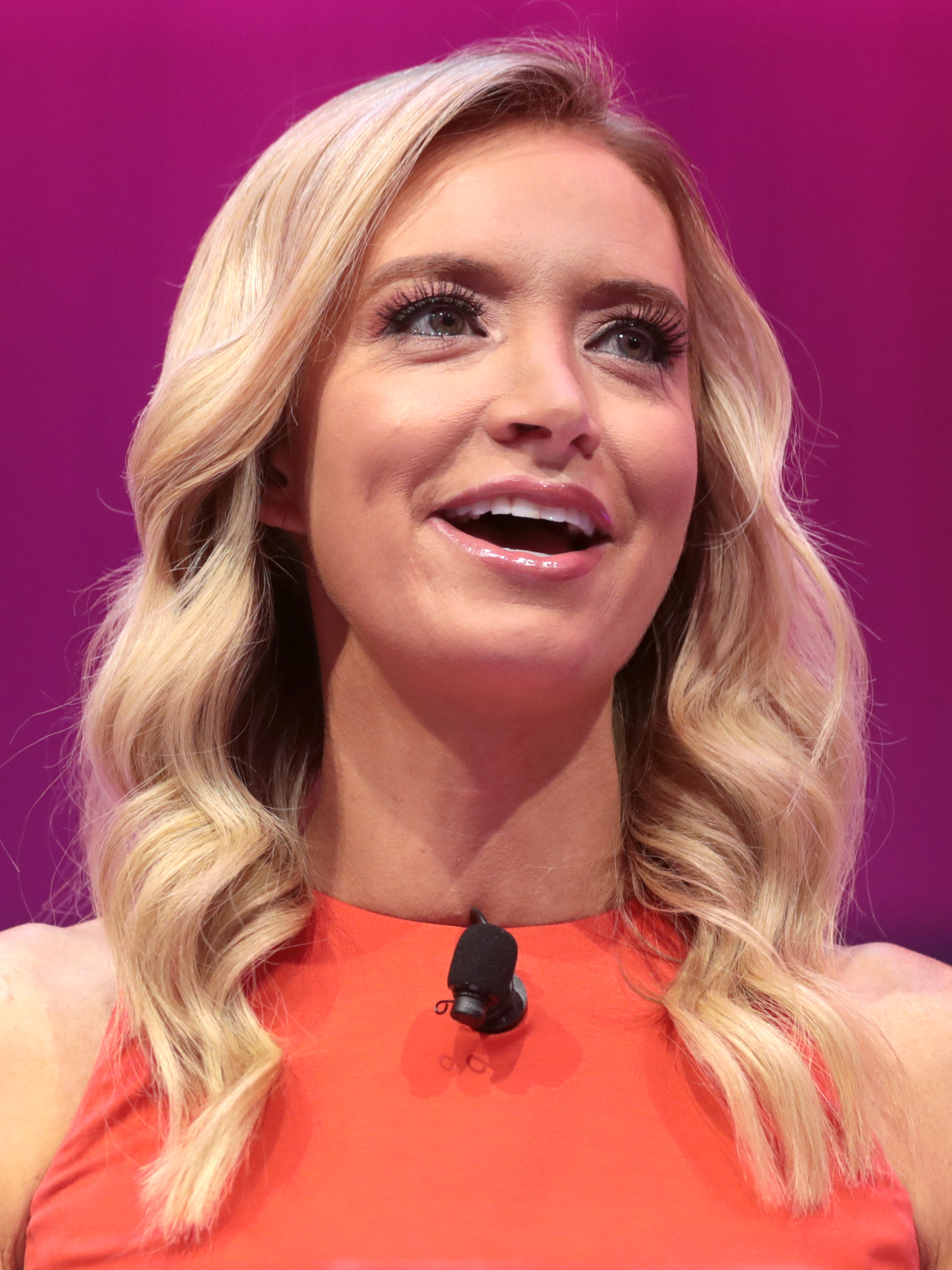
Kayleigh McEnany

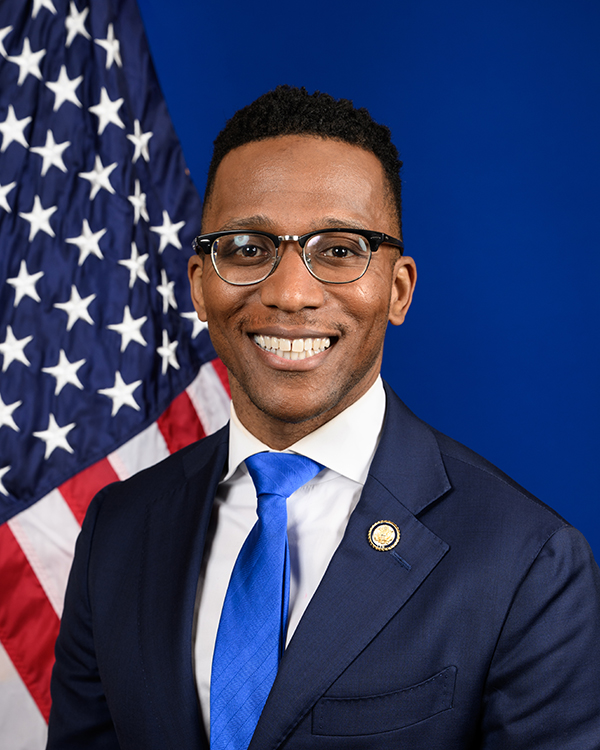
Christian Menefee

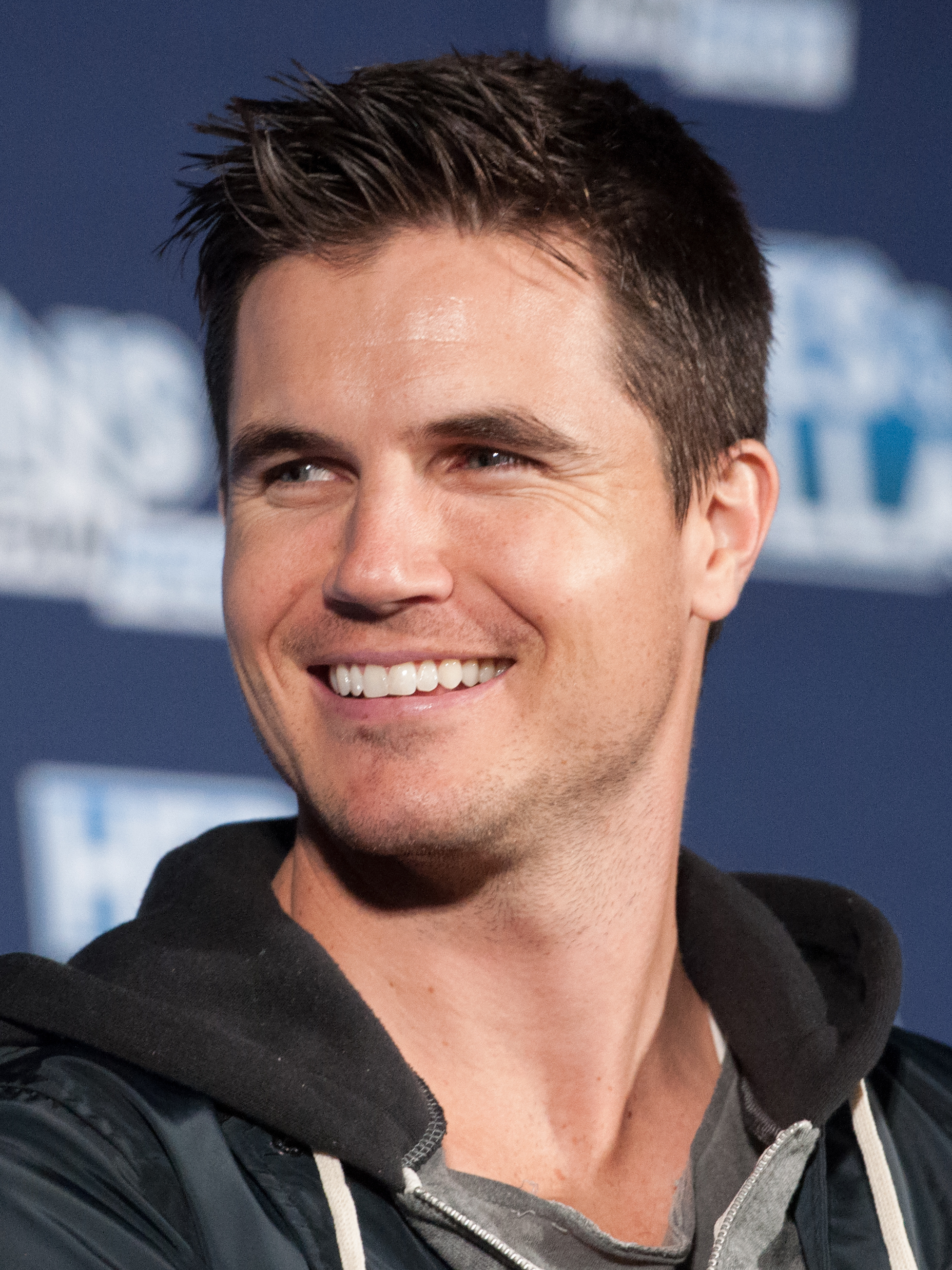
Robbie Amell

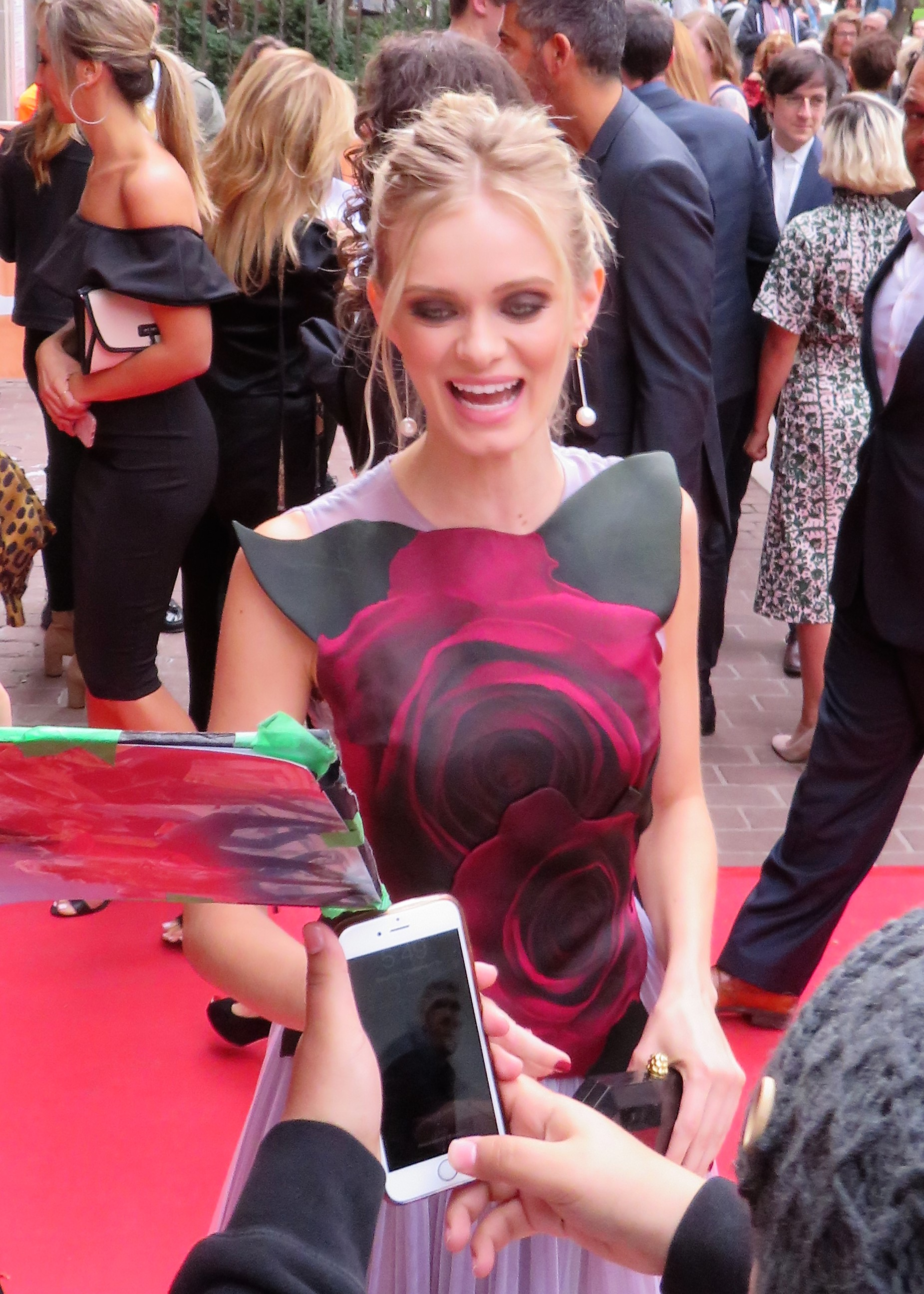
Sara Paxton

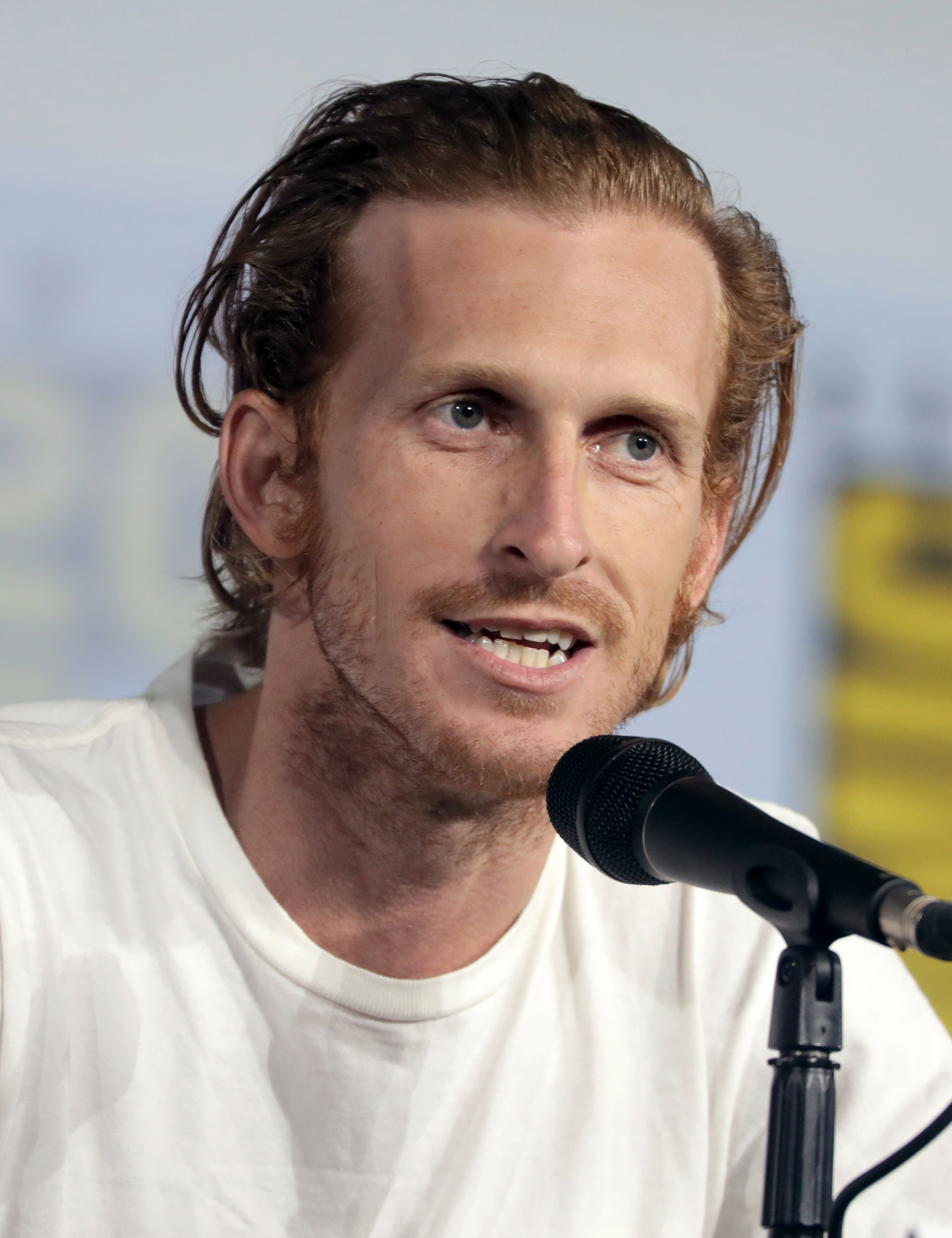
Austin Amelio

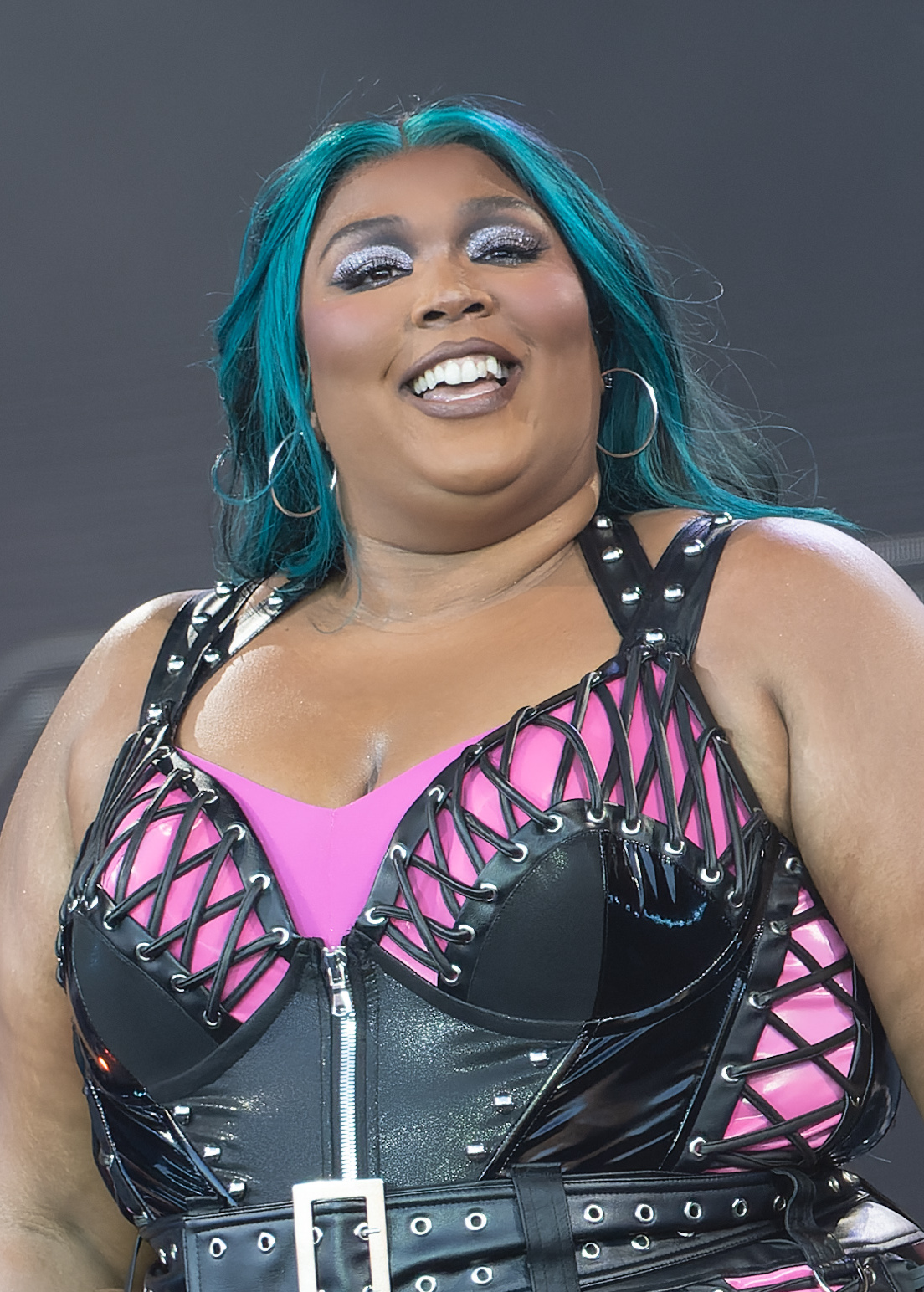
Lizzo

- April 1
  - Alyssa Bonagura, singer/songwriter
  - Derek Campos, mixed martial artist
  - Brook Lopez, basketball player
- April 2
  - Garrett Chisolm, football player
  - Jesse Plemons, actor
- April 3
  - Kam Chancellor, football player
  - Brandon Graham, football player
  - William Knight, mixed martial artist
- April 5 – Alisha Glass, volleyball player
- April 7
  - Chelsea Alden, actress
  - Joseph Bramlett, golfer
  - Charles Brewer, baseball player
  - Keith Browner Jr., football player
- April 8 – Candice Cuoco, fashion designer
- April 9 – Ryan Broyles, football player
- April 10
  - Molly Bernard, actress
  - Haley Joel Osment, actor
- April 11 – Pete Kozma, baseball player
- April 12
  - Ryan Brooks, basketball player
  - Jessie James Decker, country pop singer/songwriter
- April 13
  - Cody Arnoux, soccer player
  - Kallie Flynn Childress, actress
  - Stephanie Coleman, politician
  - Dwayne Collins, basketball player (d. 2025)
  - Allison Williams, actress
- April 14
  - Eric Alexander, soccer player
  - Emmanuel Bor, Kenyan-born long-distance runner
  - Sarah Bullard, lacrosse player
  - Mike Carman, ice hockey player
  - Lehmon Colbert, basketball player
  - Chris Wood, actor
- April 15
  - Justin Anderson, football player
  - Erin Lee Carr, filmmaker
  - Bill Clark, basketball player
  - Chris Stuckmann, film critic, filmmaker, author, and YouTuber
- April 17
  - Kourtnei Brown, football player
  - Dasha Gonzalez, wrestler and model
- April 18
  - Justin Burrell, basketball player
  - Jessica Cambensy, American-born Hong Kong model and actress
  - Kayleigh McEnany, political commentator and White House press secretary
  - Christian Menefee, attorney and politician
- April 19
  - Trevor Lee, rapper
- April 20
  - Brandon Belt, baseball player
  - Nick Bonino, ice hockey player
- April 21
  - Robbie Amell, Canadian-born actor and producer
  - Ricky Berens, Olympic swimmer
  - JR Buensuceso, basketball player
  - Jencarlos Canela, singer/songwriter and actor
  - Christoph Sanders, actor
- April 23
  - Stacey Bridges, rugby player
  - Justin Brownlee, basketball player
  - Molly Burnett, actress, singer, and producer
- April 24 – Jermaine Cunningham, football player
- April 25
  - Rachel Cruze, writer and author
  - Sara Paxton, actress, singer, and model
- April 26 – BrolyLegs, fighting game player (d. 2024)
- April 27
  - Austin Amelio, actor
  - Lizzo, singer/songwriter and rapper
- April 28
  - Justin Boren, football player
  - Carlos Brown, football player
  - Sebo Walker, skateboarder and artist
- April 29
  - Aanders Brorson, Canadian-born curler
  - Carson Coffman, football player
- April 30 – Antonio Ballard, basketball player

=== May ===
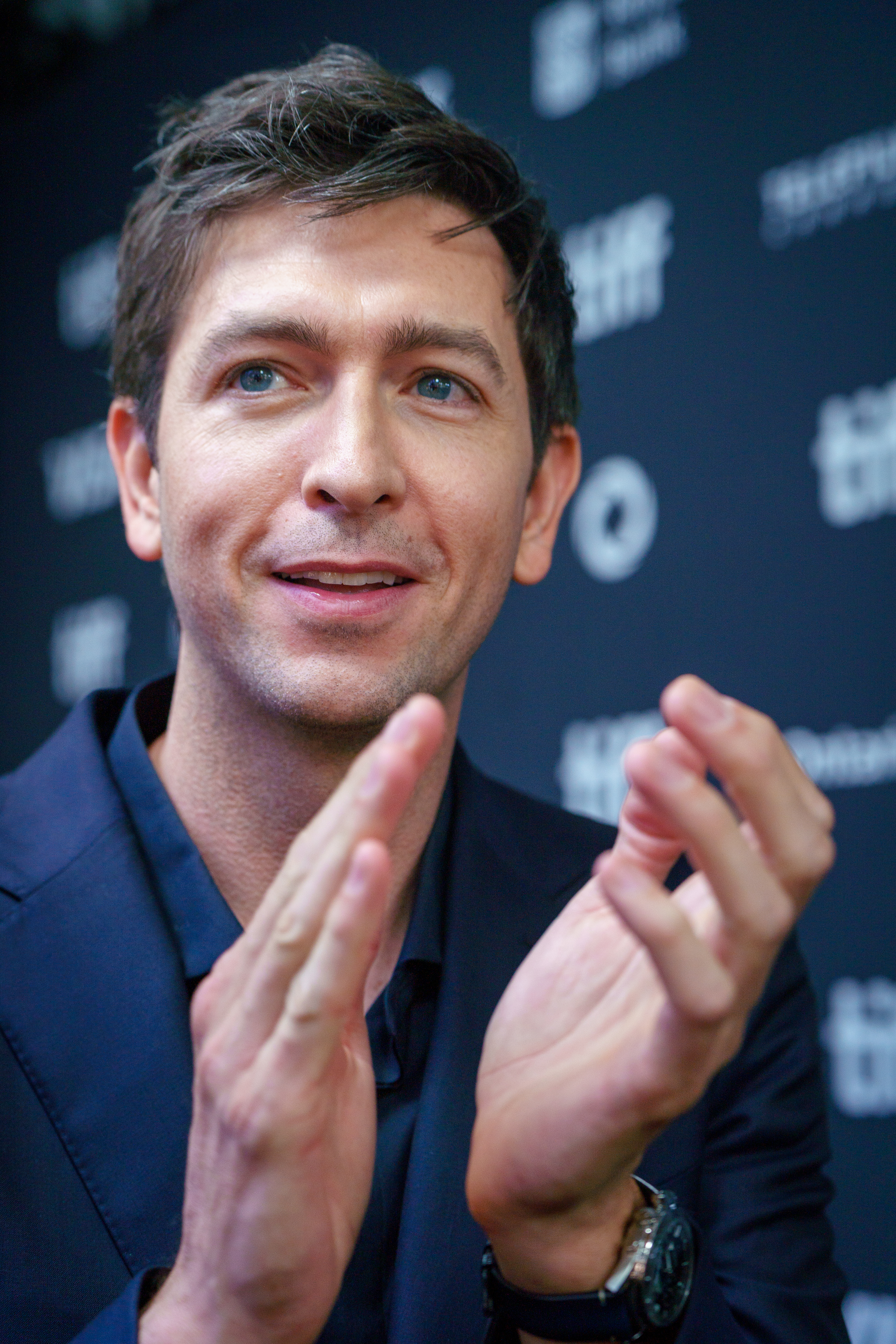
Nicholas Braun

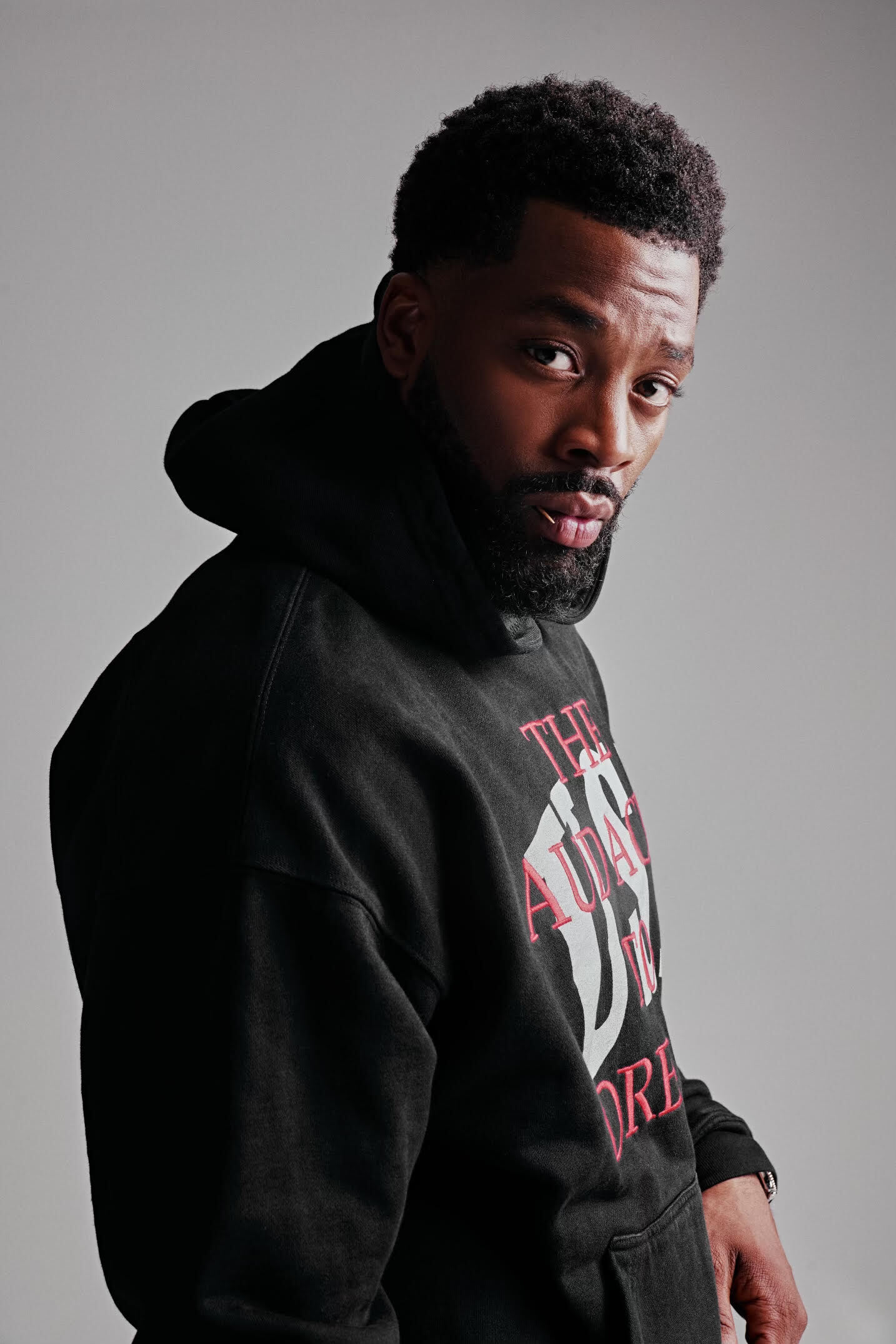
LaRoyce Hawkins

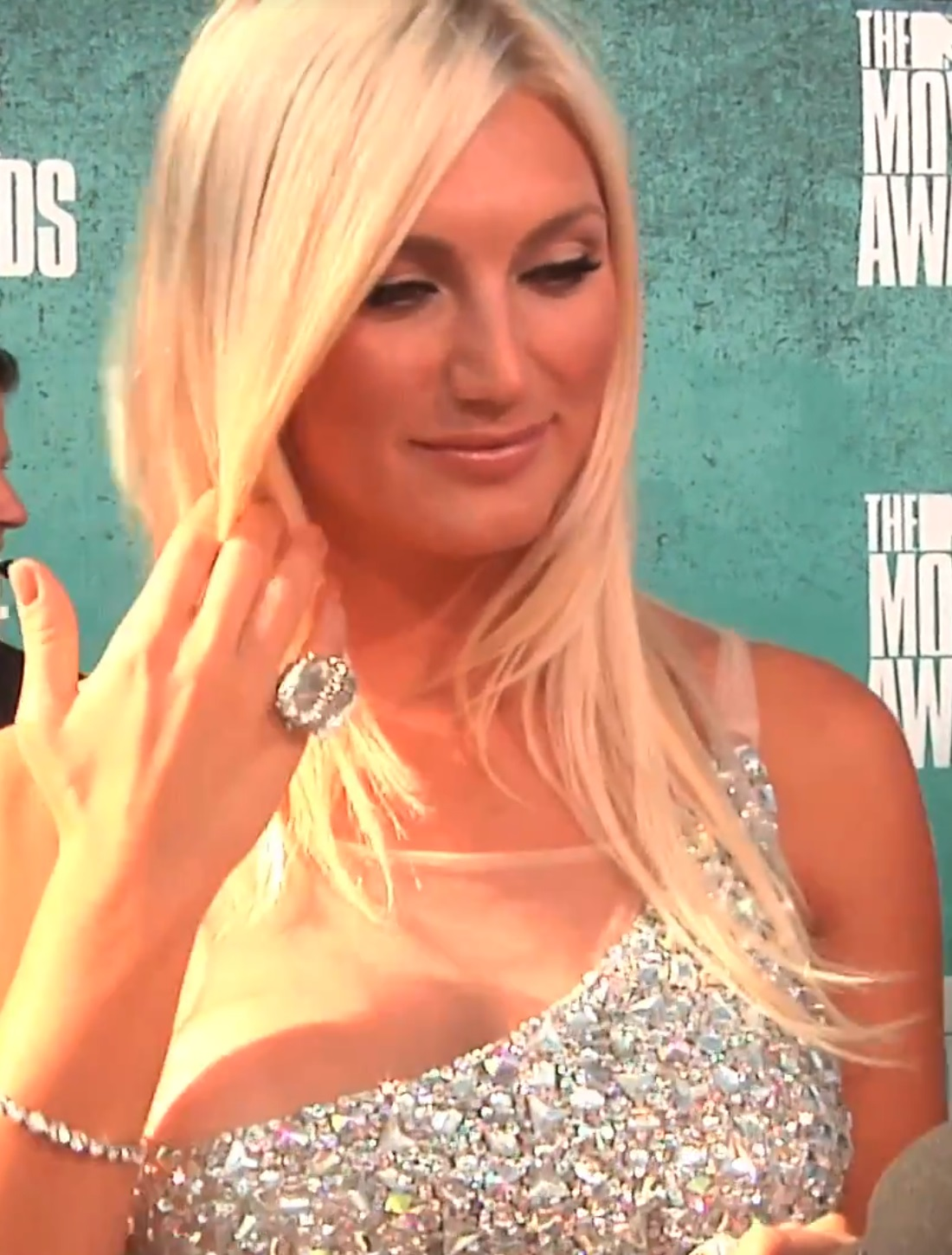
Brooke Hogan

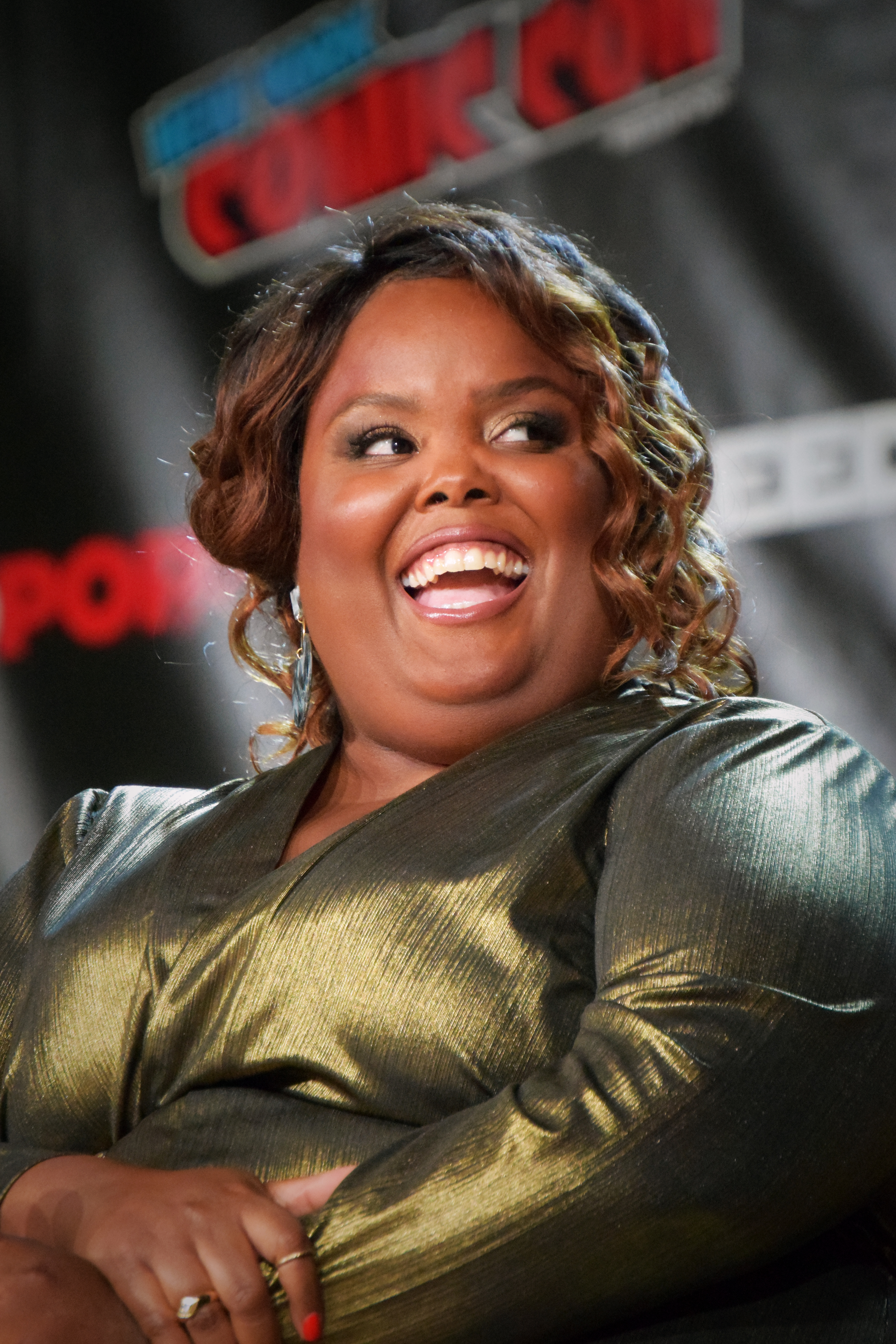
Danielle Pinnock

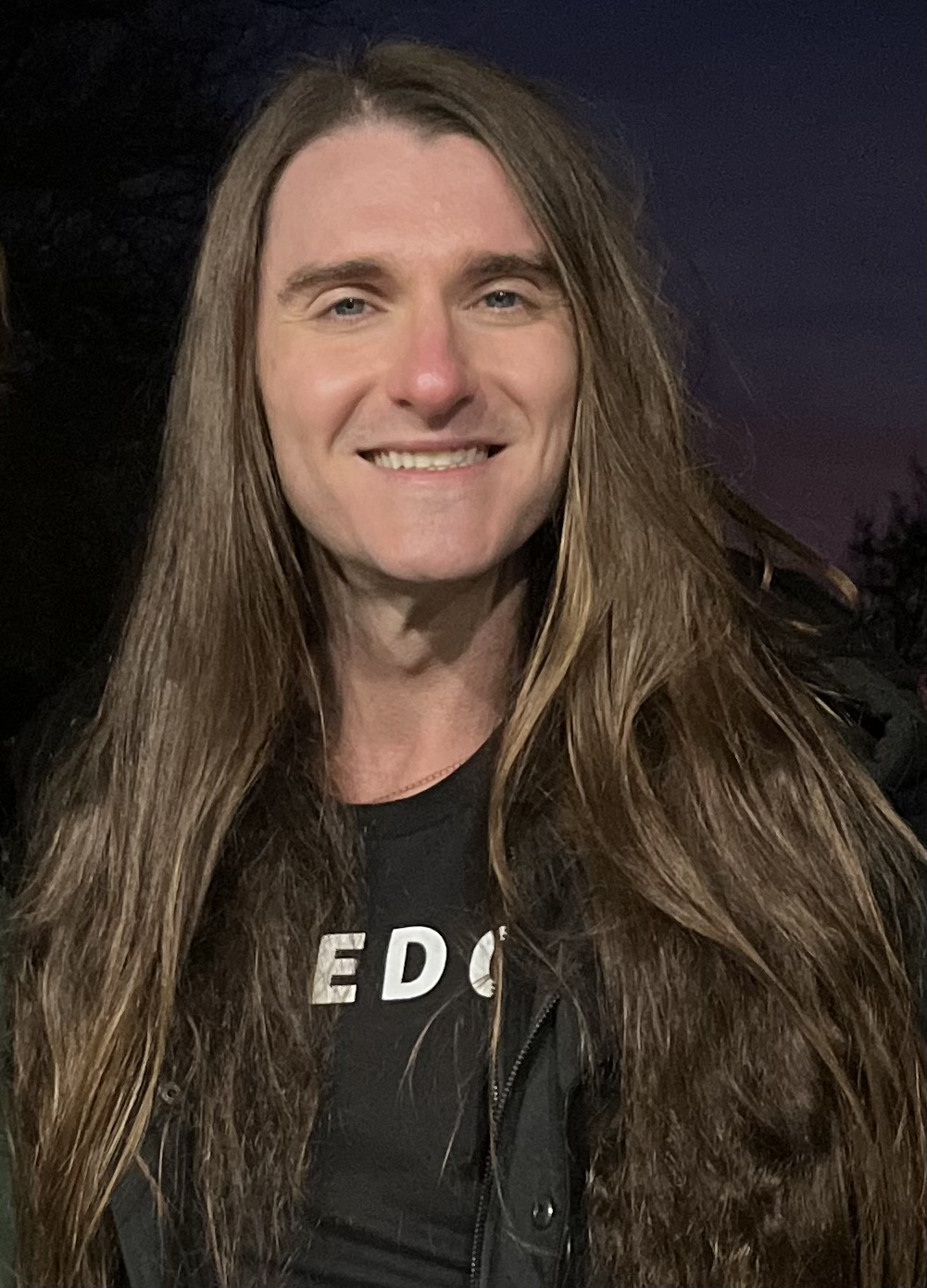
Scott Presler

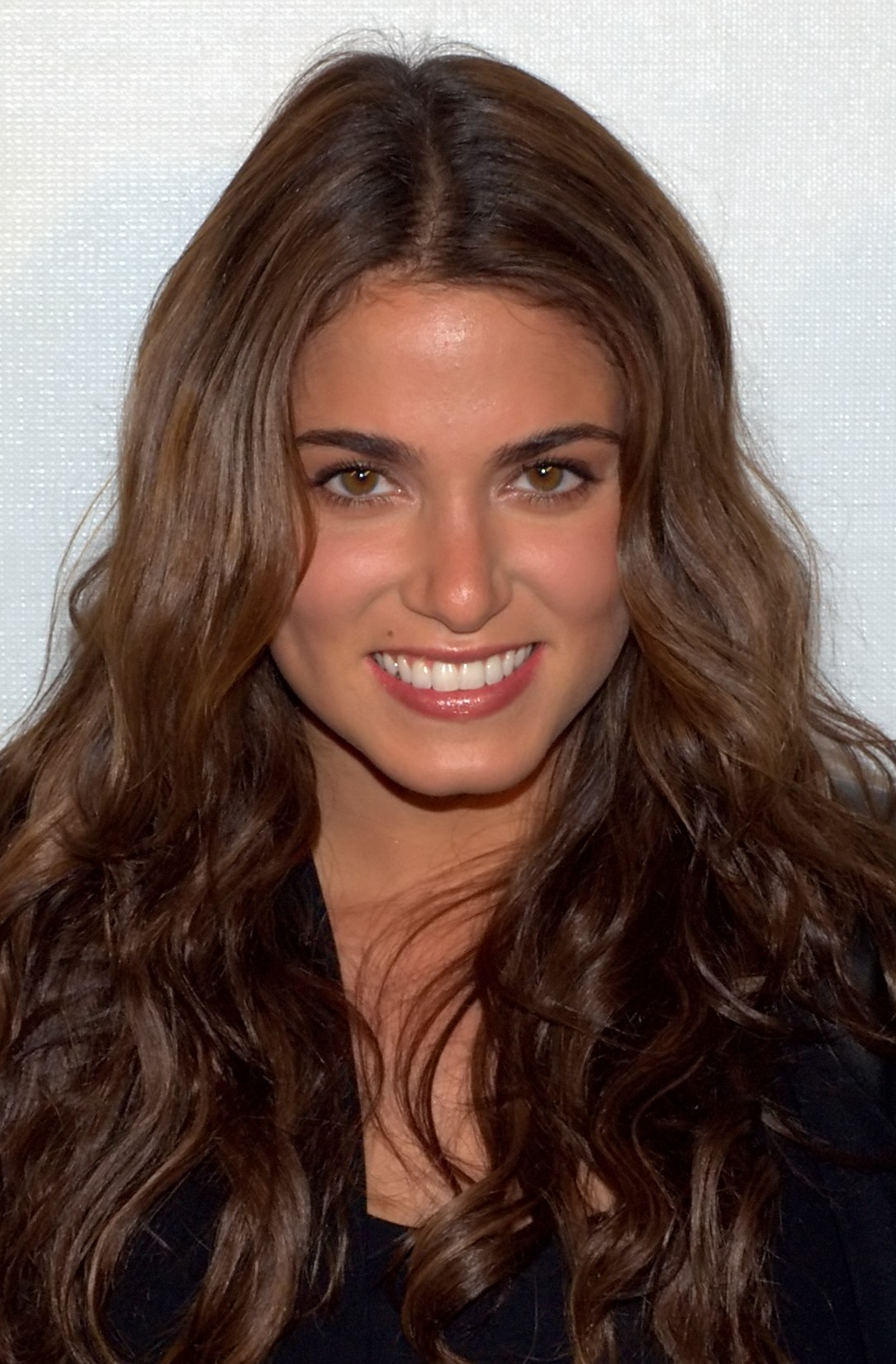
Nikki Reed

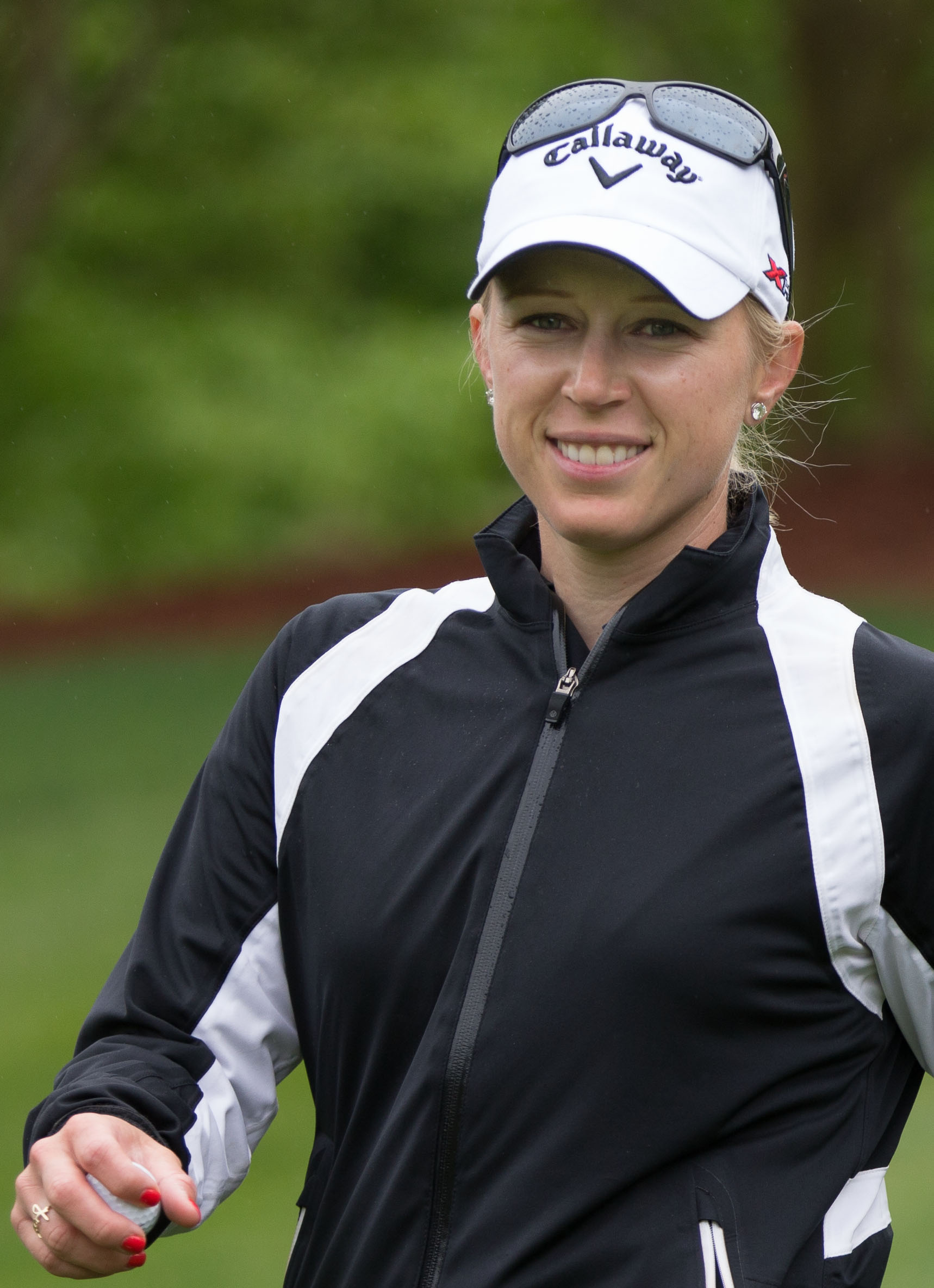
Morgan Pressel

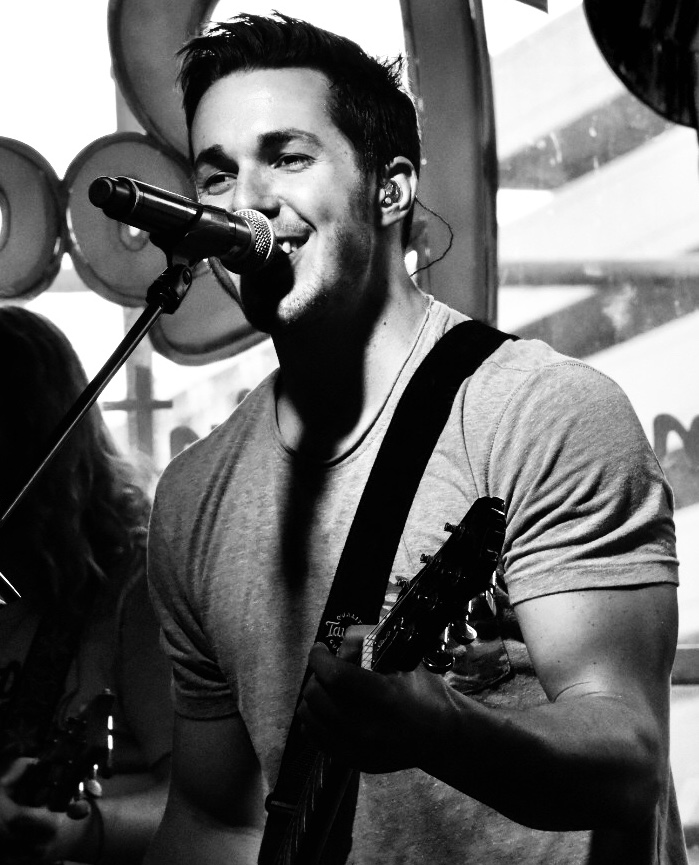
Cale Dodds

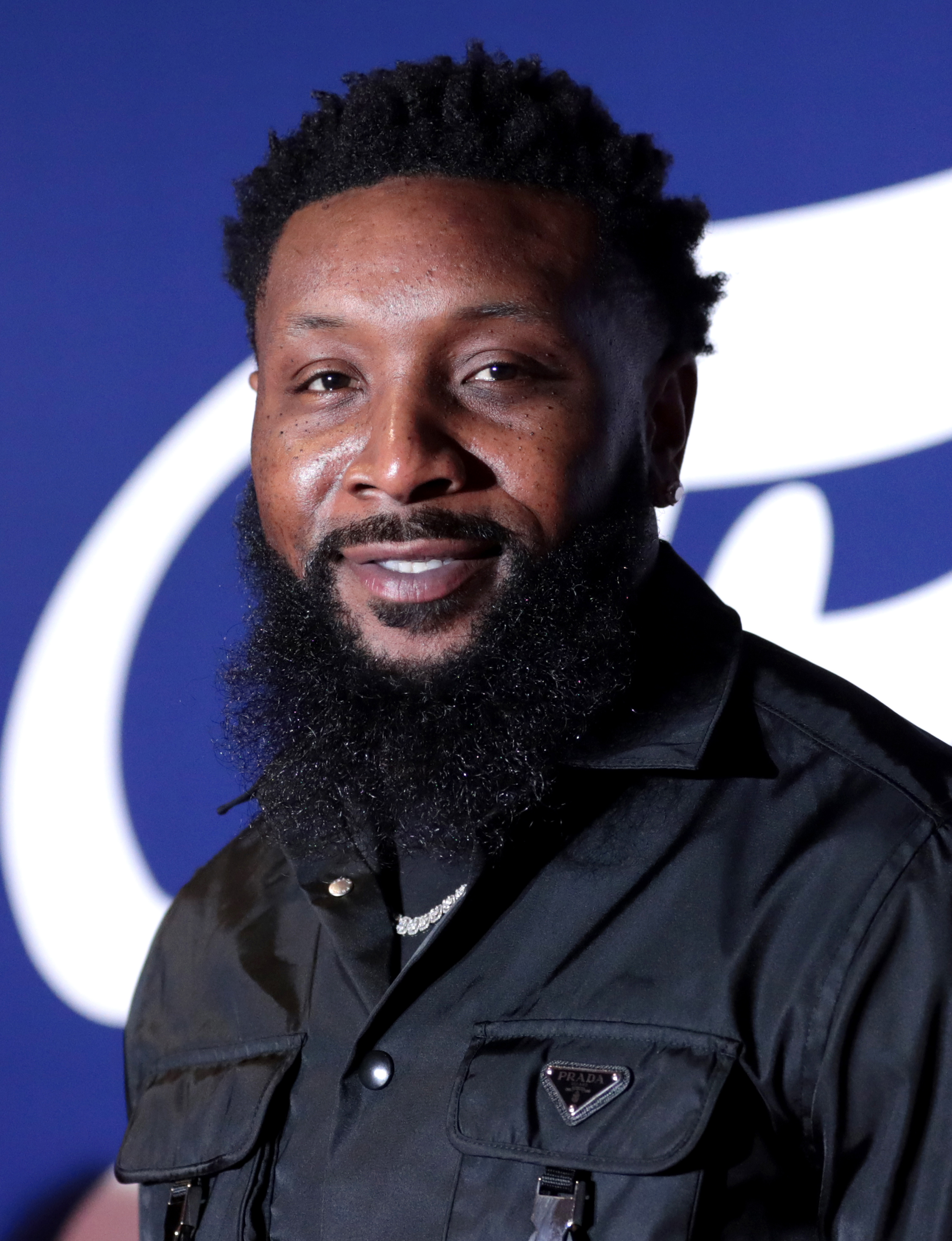
NaVorro Bowman

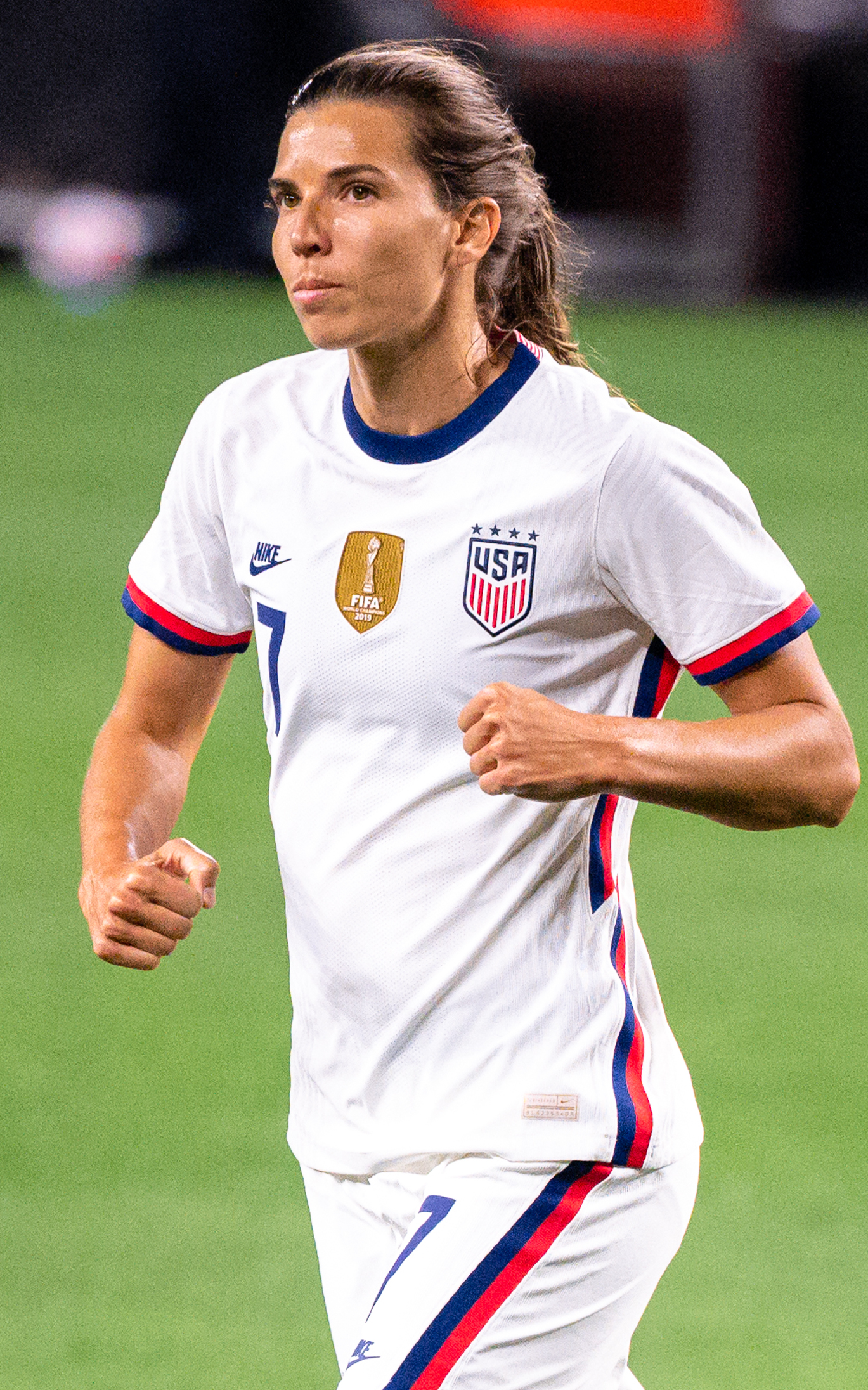
Tobin Heath

- May 1
  - André Anderson, football player
  - Nicholas Braun, actor
  - Cody Renard Richard, stage manager, producer, and educator
- May 2
  - Musa Abdul-Aleem, basketball player
  - Shaun Chapas, football player
- May 4
  - Christian Bergman, baseball player
  - Derrick Caracter, basketball player
  - LaRoyce Hawkins, actor, stand-up comic, spoken word artist, and musician
- May 5
  - Kevin Alston, soccer player
  - Michael Cognata, actor and record producer
  - Jessica Dubroff, trainee aviator (d. 1996)
  - Brooke Hogan, reality star and singer
- May 6
  - Ryan Anderson, basketball player
  - Luis Cálix, soccer player
  - Marcus Cannon, football player
  - Whitney Conder, wrestler
- May 7
  - Blair Braverman, adventurer, dogsled racer, musher, advice columnist, and nonfiction writer
  - Brandon Jones, actor, musician, and producer
- May 8
  - Ivy Audrain, cyclist
  - Trisha Paytas, YouTuber
- May 9 – Buddy Boshers, baseball player
- May 10
  - Mat Franco, magician
  - Adam Ward, photojournalist (d. 2015)
- May 11
  - Ace Hood, rapper
  - Julia Avila, mixed martial artist
  - Blac Chyna, model and entrepreneur
  - Nikki Cleary, pop rock singer
  - Jeremy Maclin, football player
  - Danielle Pinnock, actress
- May 13
  - Freddie Braun, soccer player
  - Tim Maypray, football player (d. 2019)
  - Matt McLean, Olympic swimmer
- May 15
  - Dillon Bates, politician
  - Nate Costa, football player
  - Scott Presler, conservative activist and founder of Early Vote Action
- May 16
  - Julia Adolphe, composer
  - Jermaine Fowler, actor and comedian
- May 17 – Nikki Reed, actress, singer/songwriter, and screenwriter
- May 18 – Johnny Culbreath, football player
- May 19
  - Mike Alessi, motorcycle racer
  - Kevin Basped, football player
  - Zack Pearlman, actor
- May 20
  - Nathaniel Brown, actor and director
  - Kayden Carter, wrestler
- May 21 – Chase Baker, football player and coach
- May 22
  - Andrew Augustin, video game designer
  - Sergio Brown, football player
  - Chase Budinger, volleyball player
  - Doug DeMuro, automotive columnist and internet personality
  - Santana Garrett, wrestler and model
- May 23
  - Vic Black, baseball player
  - Jackie Briggs, field hockey player
  - Morgan Pressel, golfer
  - Zachary "Kid Yamaka" Wohlman, boxer
- May 24
  - Anhayla, singer/songwriter
  - Monica Lin Brown, U.S. Army medic and silver star recipient
  - Billy Gilman, singer
- May 25
  - Carlos Aguilar, soccer player
  - Britta Büthe, American-born German volleyball player
  - Bruce Campbell, football player
  - Lee Chatfield, politician
  - Matt Clare, soccer player
- May 26
  - Brad Balsley, sports shooter
  - Cami Bradley, singer/songwriter, keyboardist, and television personality
  - Damian Williams, American football player
- May 27
  - Brad Boxberger, baseball player
  - Jacobs Crawley, rodeo cowboy
  - Art Cruz, drummer for Lamb of God, Winds of Plague (2008–2022), Prong (2014–2018), and Klogr (2017)
  - Vontae Davis, football player (d. 2024)
  - Cale Dodds, country singer/songwriter
  - Stevin John, children's entertainer and educator
  - Alicia Sixtos, actress
- May 28
  - Justin Bour, baseball player
  - NaVorro Bowman, football player
  - Ryan Court, baseball player
  - Brian Justin Crum, singer and actor
- May 29
  - Derrius Brooks, football player
  - Garrett Celek, football player
  - Tobin Heath, soccer player
- May 30
  - C. R. Crews, racing driver
  - No Way Jose, wrestler
- May 31 – Rogét Chahayed, record producer and songwriter

=== June ===
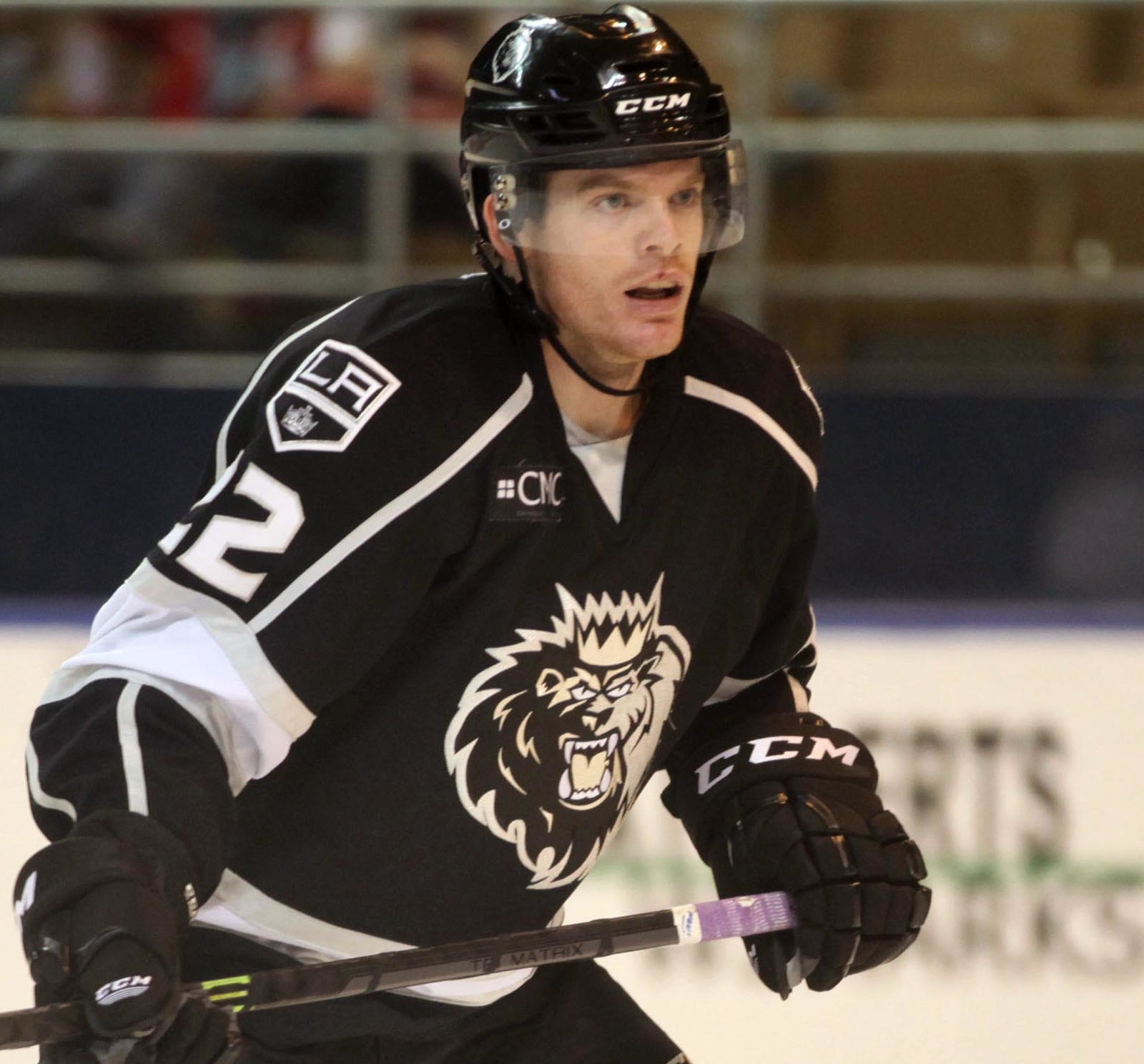
Brian O'Neill

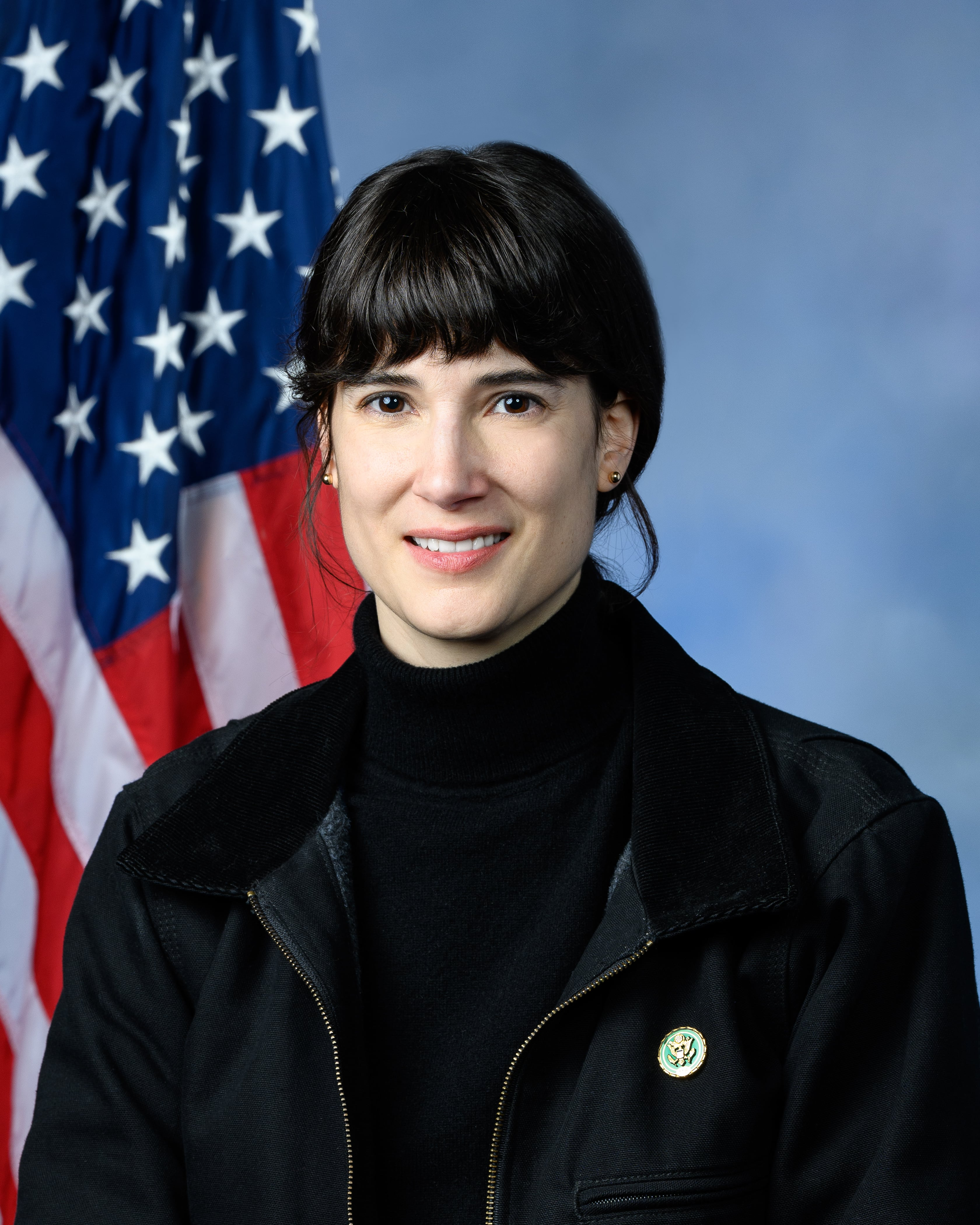
Marie Gluesenkamp Perez

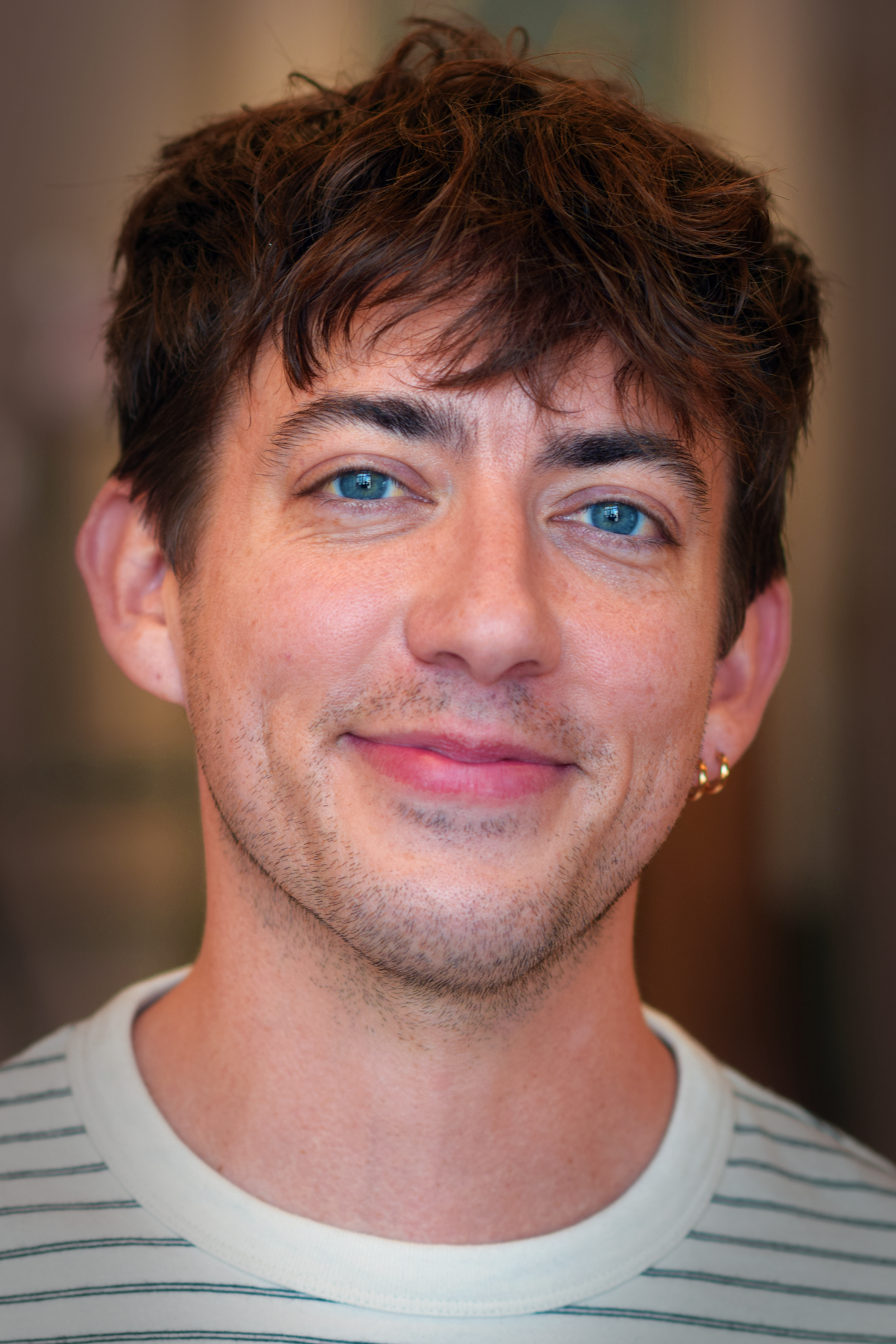
Kevin McHale

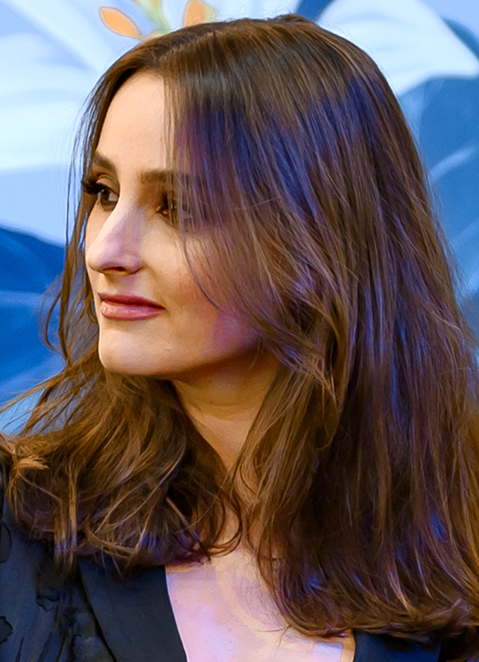
Banks

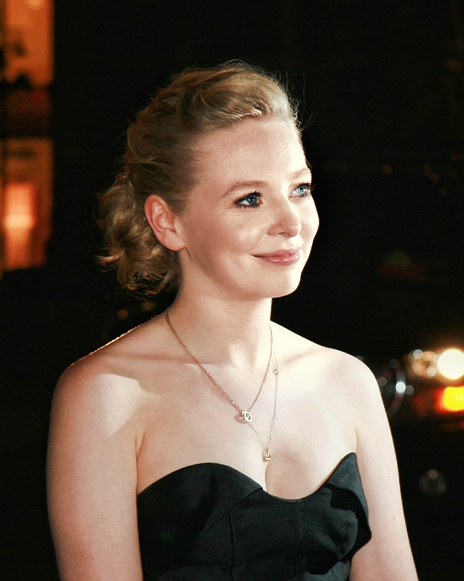
Portia Doubleday

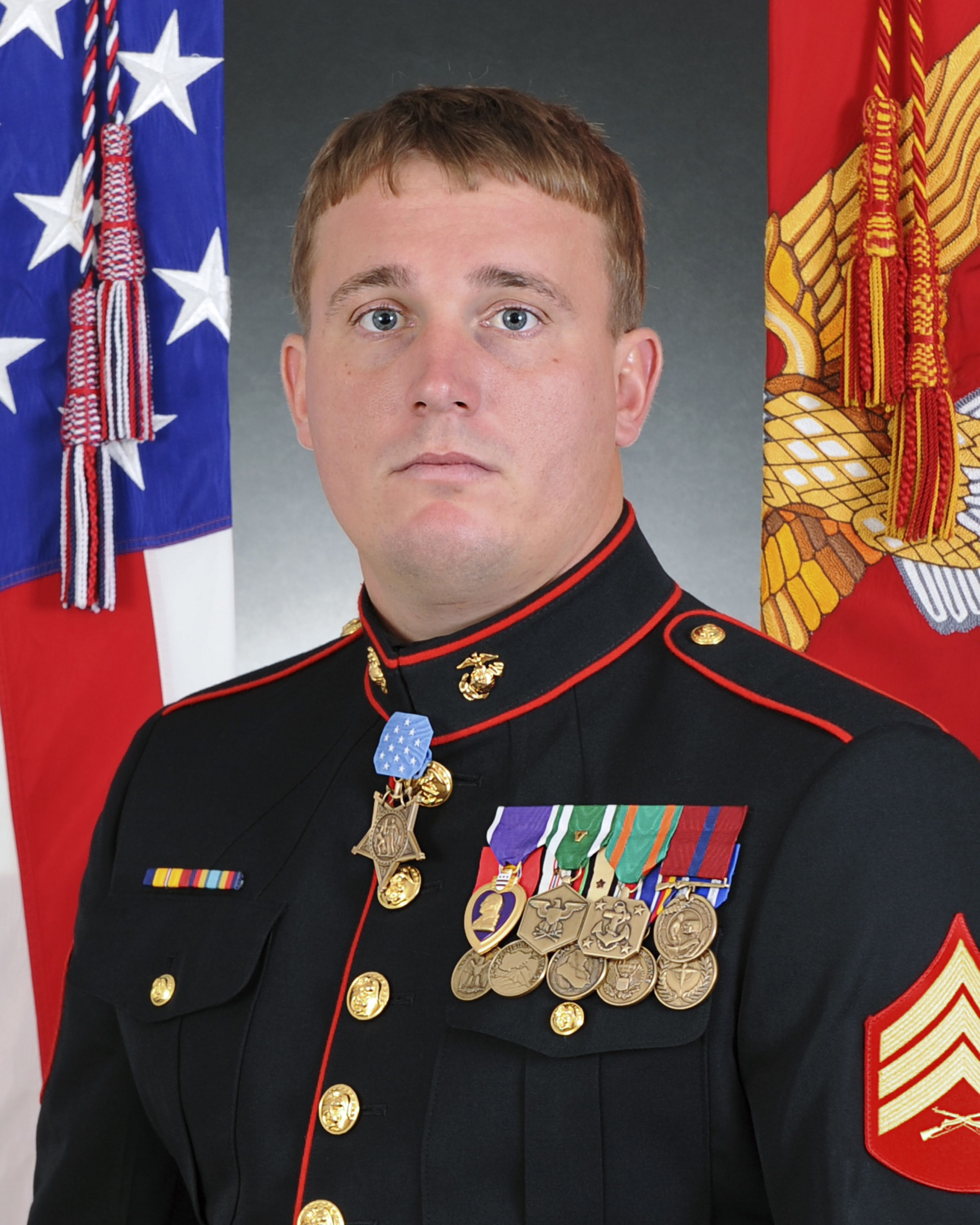
Dakota Meyer

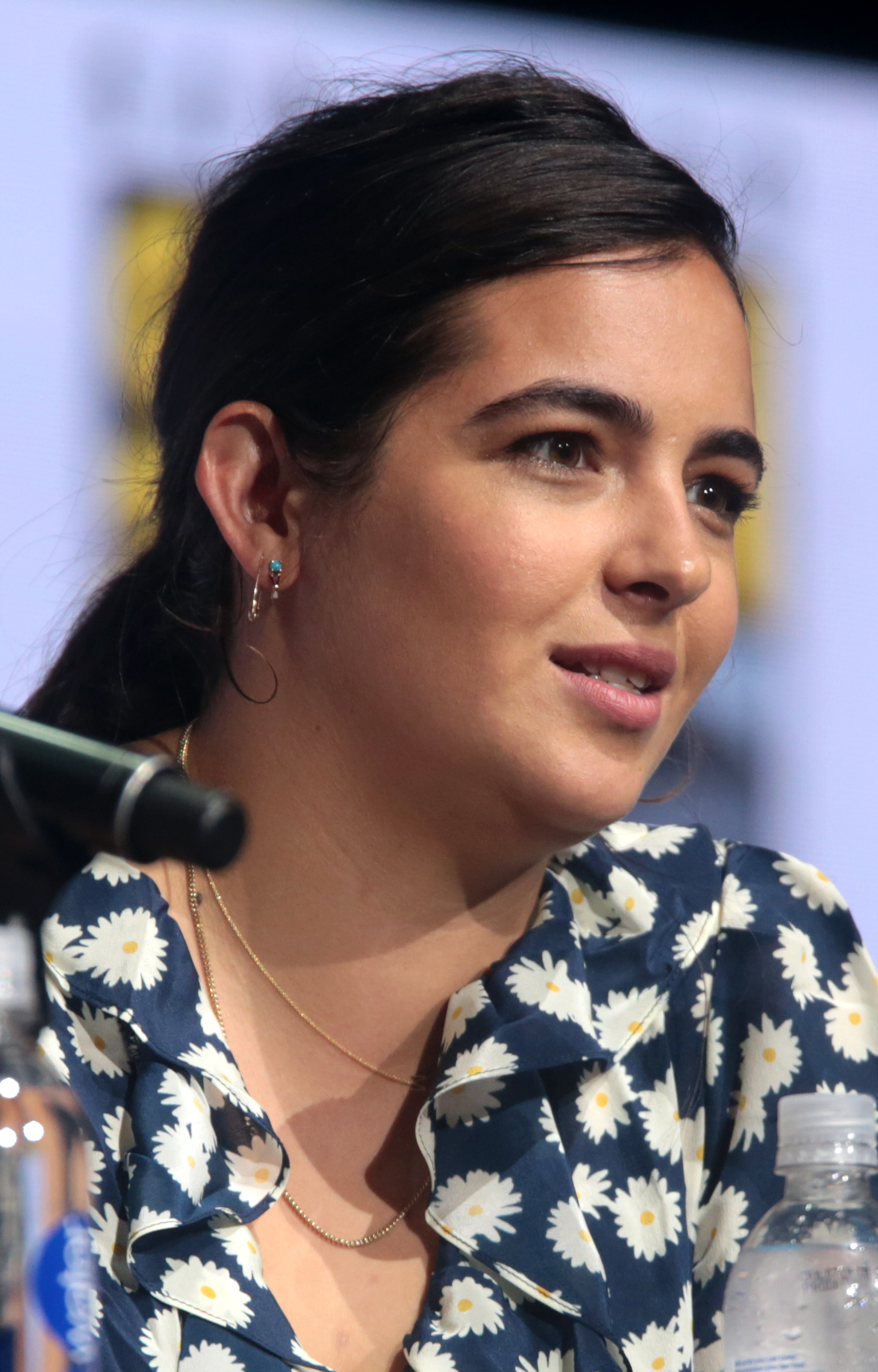
Alanna Masterson

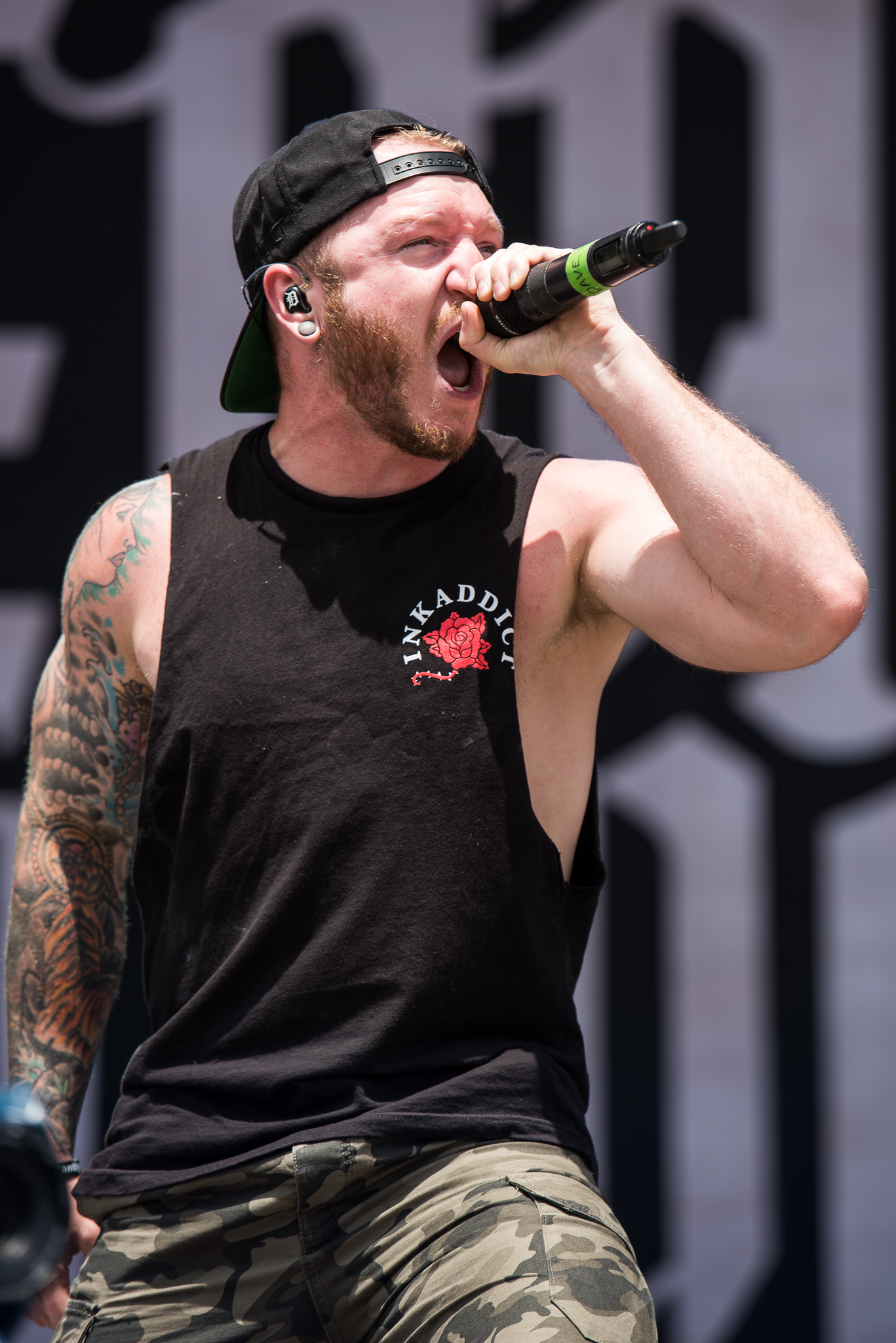
Dave Stephens

- June 1
  - Brian O'Neill, Olympic ice hockey player
  - Ross Von Erich, wrestler
- June 2
  - Mustafa Abdul-Hamid, basketball player
  - Mister Alexander, football player
  - Zuri Hall, entertainment reporter, television personality, actress and producer
  - Joe Young, football player
- June 3
  - Patrick Christopher, basketball player
  - Dave East, rapper and actor
- June 4
  - Matt Bartkowski, ice hockey player
  - Marie Gluesenkamp Perez, politician
- June 5
  - Steelo Brim, television personality, comedian, and actor
  - Ryan Mallett, football player (d. 2023)
- June 6
  - Omar Brown, football player
  - Gideon Glick, actor and singer
- June 7
  - Chris Barton, cyclist
  - Patrick Carlopoli, convicted murderer
- June 9
  - Rob Bordson, ice hockey player
  - Lauren Landa, actress
  - Mae Whitman, actress
- June 10 – Billy Bitter, lacrosse player
- June 11 – Weyes Blood, singer/songwriter and musician
- June 12
  - JHart, English-born singer/songwriter and record producer
  - Dave Melillo, singer/songwriter and guitarist
  - Cody Horn, actress and model
- June 13
  - Gabe Carimi, football player
  - Chris Cralle, hammer thrower
- June 14
  - Kara Killmer, actress
  - Kevin McHale, actor, dancer and singer
- June 16
  - Banks, singer/songwriter
  - Samantha Brand, American-born Haitian soccer player
  - Jermaine Gresham, football player
- June 17 – Ryan Neff, singer and bassist for Miss May I
- June 18 – Josh Dun, drummer for Twenty One Pilots
- June 19 – Alyona Alekhina, Russian-born snowboarder, singer/songwriter, model, and musician
- June 20 – Alex Caceres, mixed martial artist
- June 22 – Portia Doubleday, actress
- June 23 – Chellsie Memmel, Olympic gymnast
- June 24
  - Nichkhun Horvejkul, American-born Thai singer
  - Stassi Schroeder, television personality, podcast host, fashion blogger, model, and author
- June 25
  - Aaron Berry, football player
  - Dorson Boyce, football player
  - Joy Cheek, basketball player
  - Rose Schlossberg, actress and daughter of Caroline Kennedy
- June 26
  - King Bach, Canadian-born actor and internet personality
  - John Brown, football player
  - Bryant Browning, football player
  - Chris Mazdzer, Olympic luger
  - Dakota Meyer, Marine veteran in the Afghan War and Medal of Honor Recipient
- June 27
  - Miles Burris, football player
  - Nate Byham, football player
  - Alanna Masterson, actress
- June 28
  - Ali Caldwell, singer/songwriter
  - Terrence Cody, football player
- June 29
  - Danny Bohn, stock car racing driver
  - Evan Call, American-born Japanese composer
- June 30
  - Tyler Cain, basketball player
  - Vinny Curry, football player
  - Jack Douglass, YouTuber, musician, and comedian
  - Sean Marquette, actor
  - Ryan W. Pearson, politician
  - Dave Stephens, singer and frontman for We Came as Romans

=== July ===
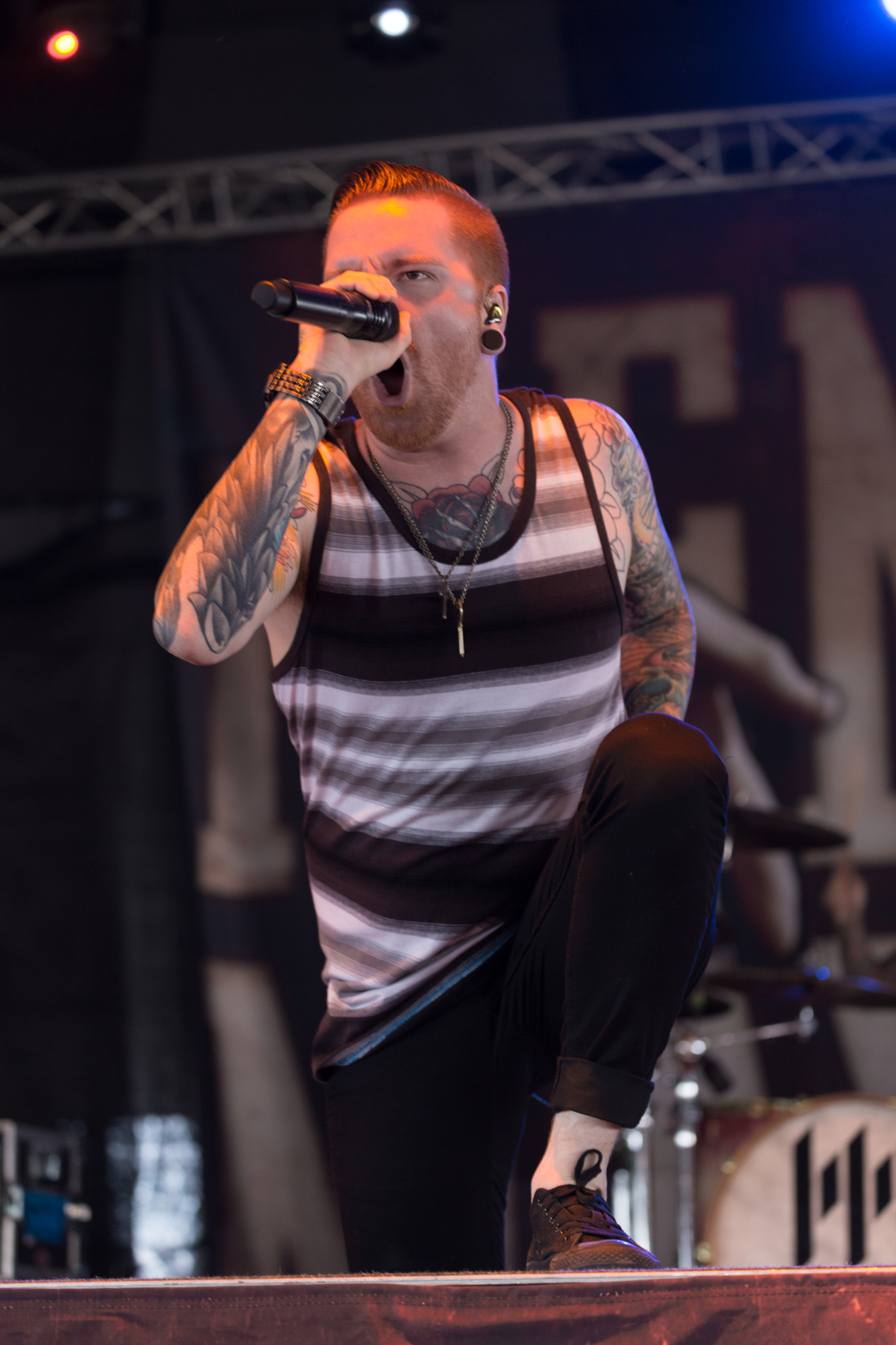
Matty Mullins

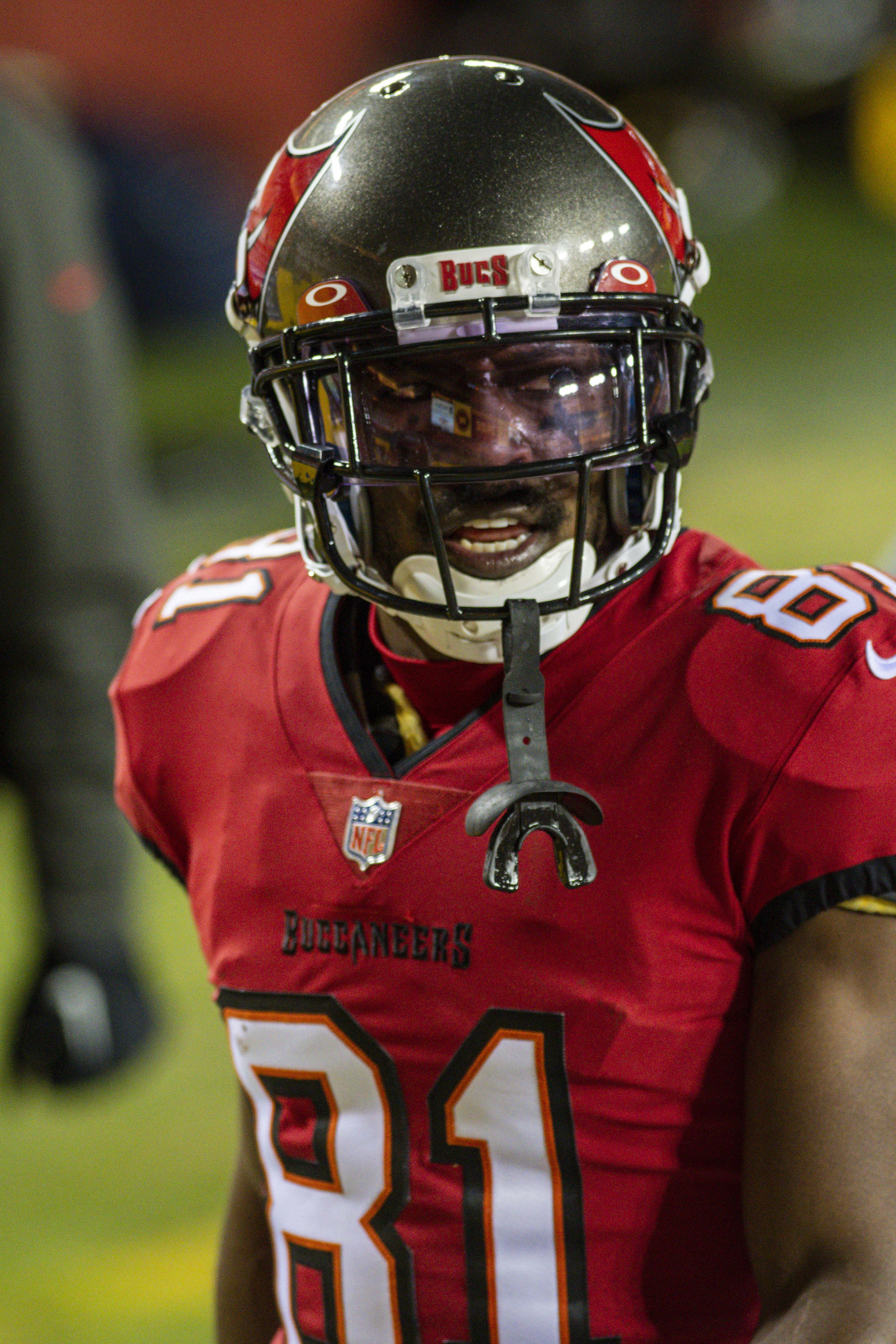
Antonio Brown

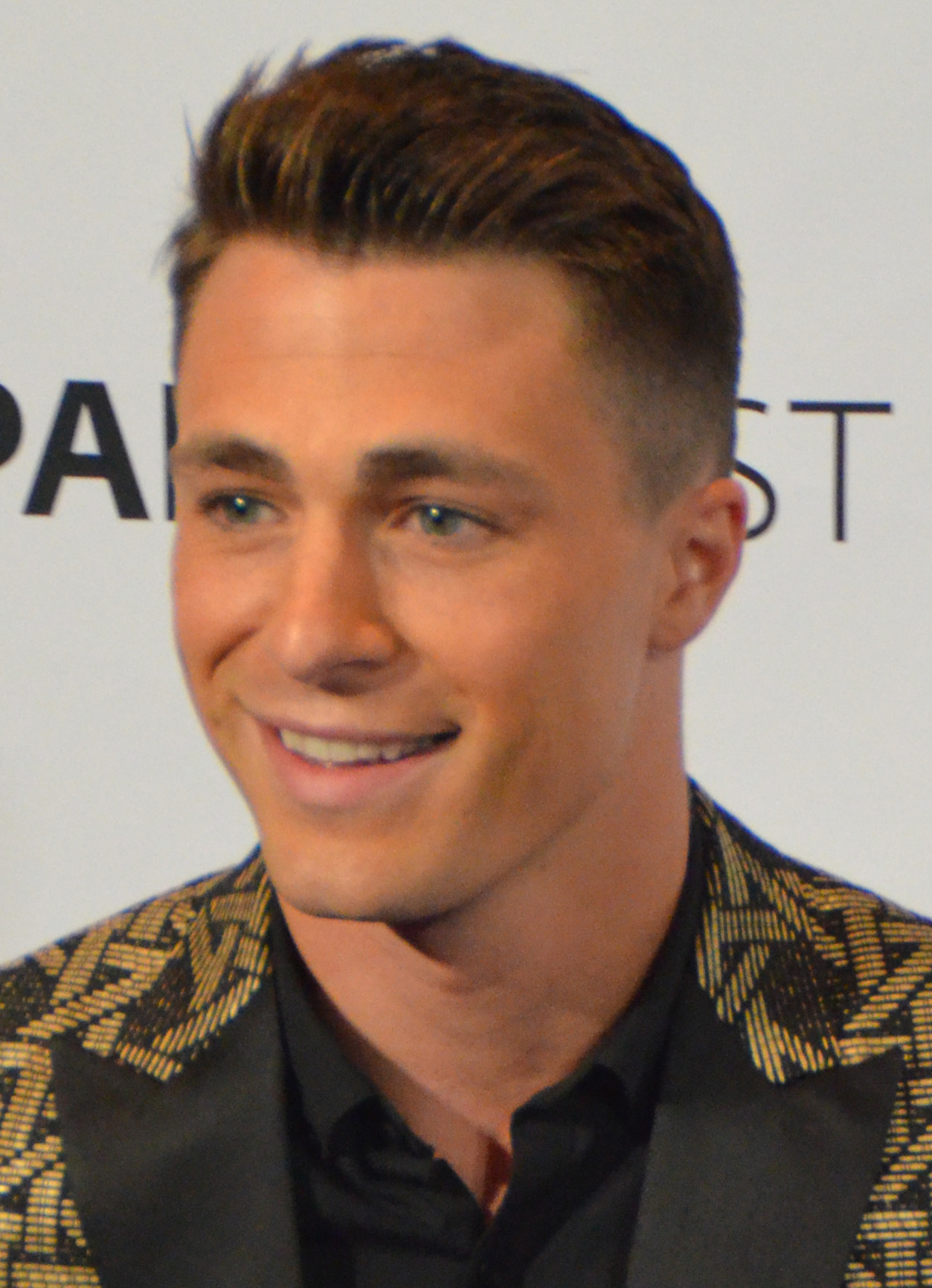
Colton Haynes

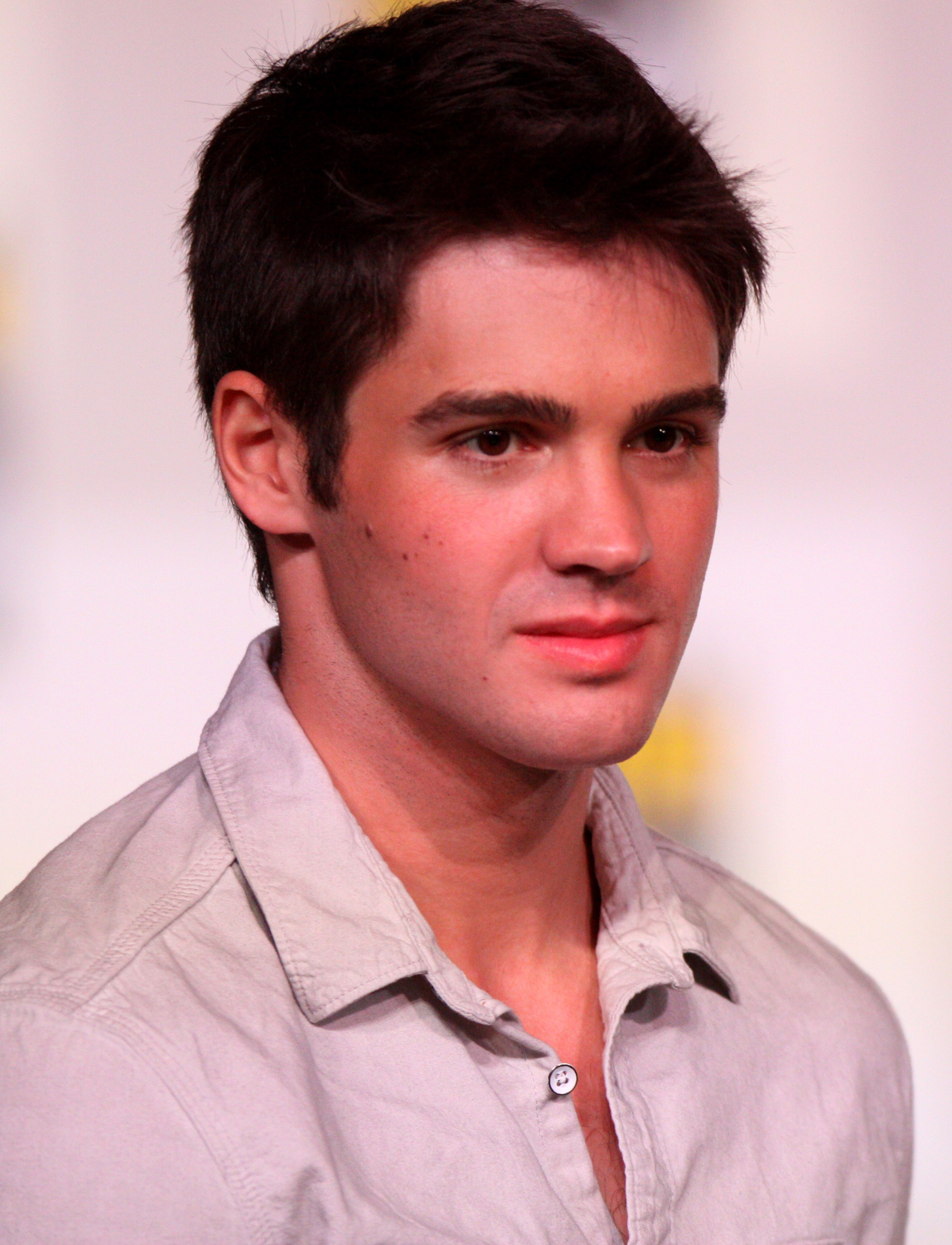
Steven R. McQueen

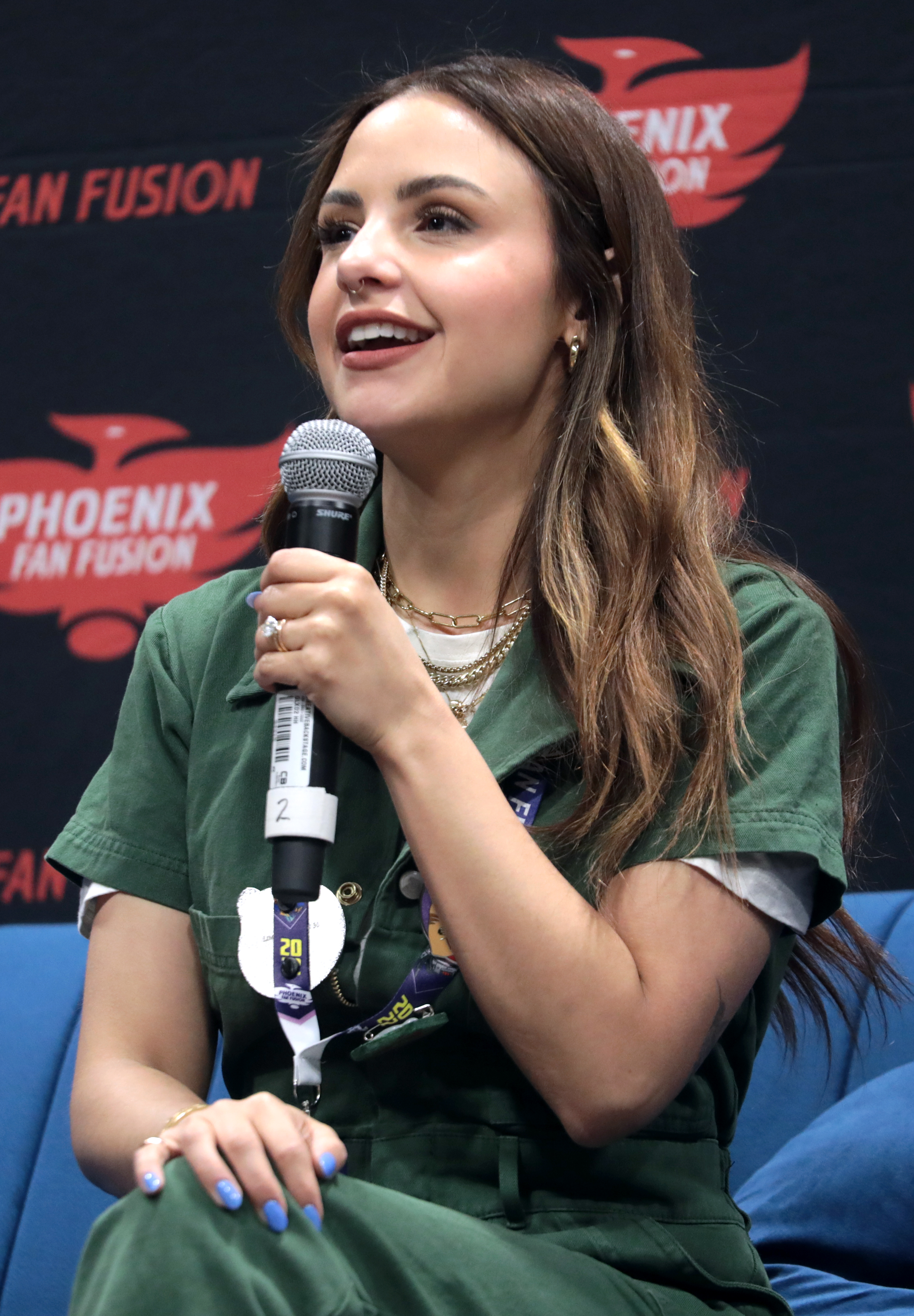
Aimee Carrero

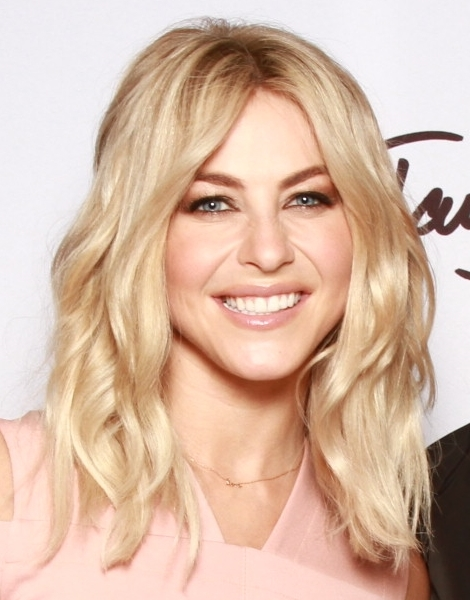
Julianne Hough

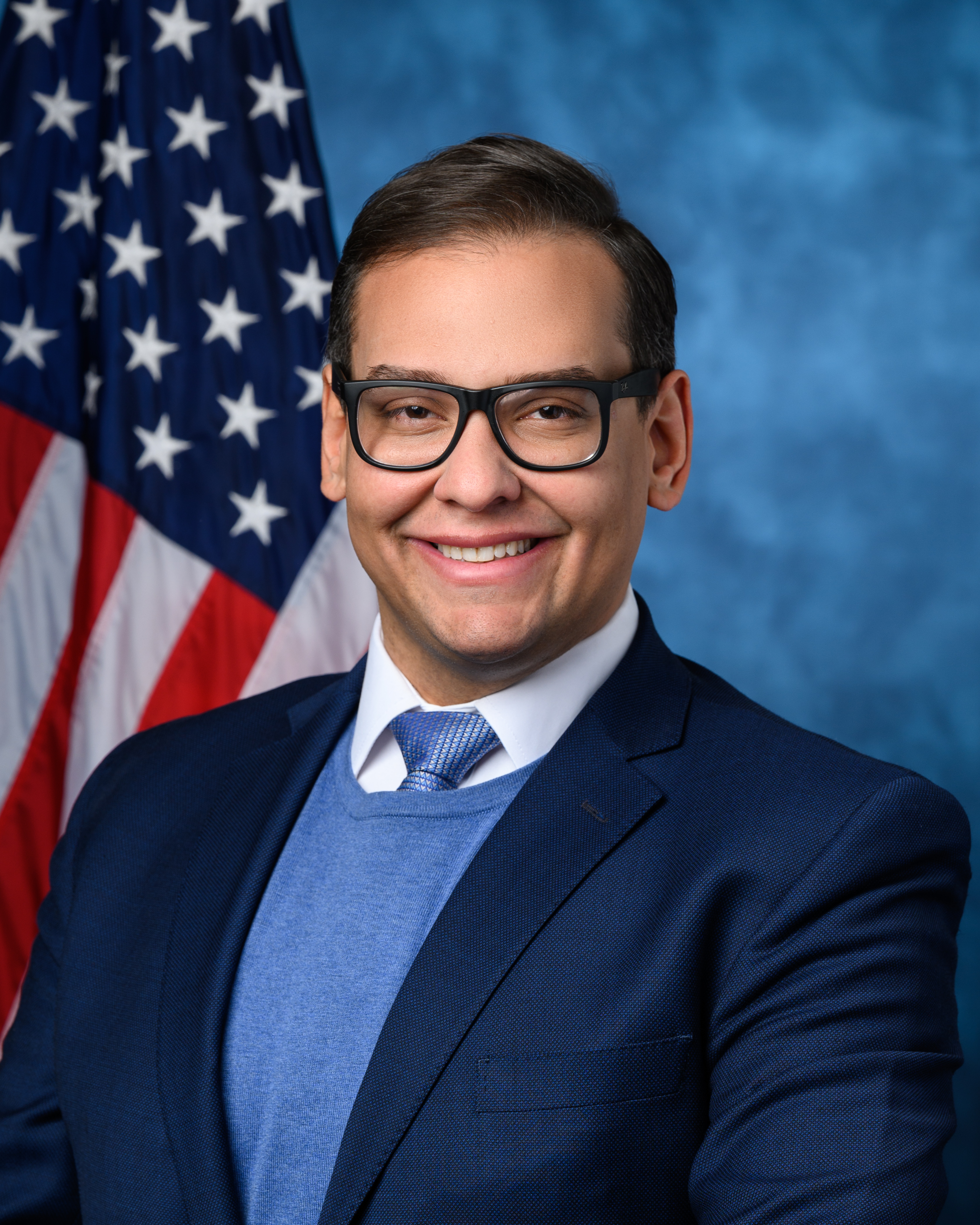
George Santos

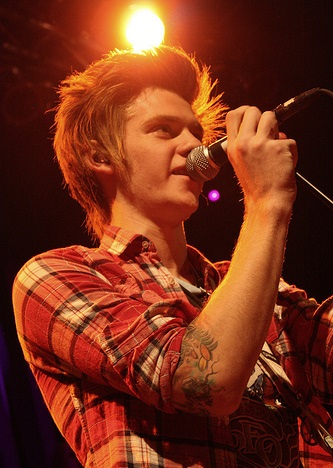
Nick Santino

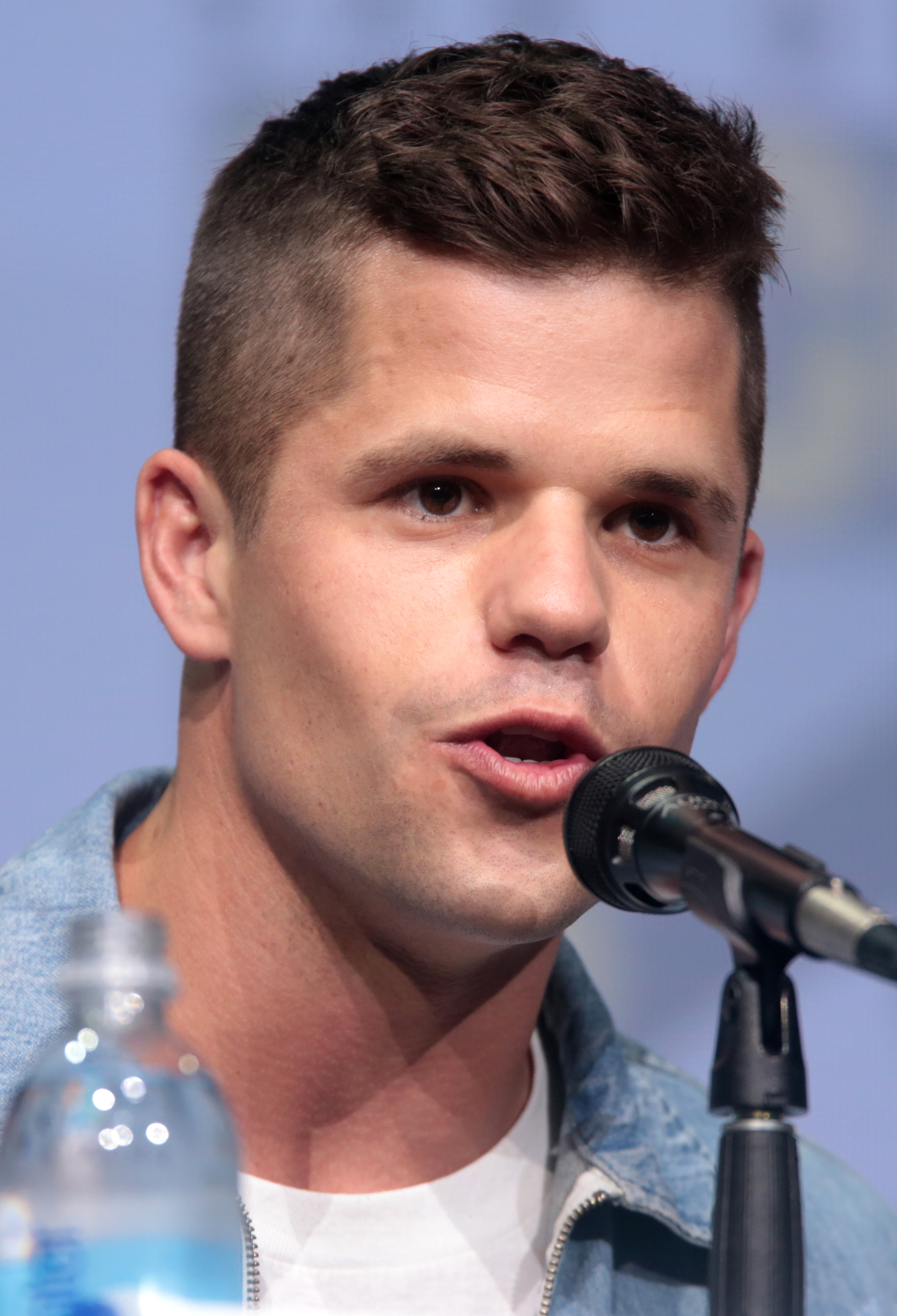
Charlie Carver

- July 1
  - Kurt Coleman, football player
  - Craig Curley, marathon runner
  - Evan Ellingson, actor (d. 2023)
  - Brian Wang, wushu taolu practitioner
- July 2 – Ronnie Ash, Olympic hurdler
- July 3
  - McLeod Bethel-Thompson, football player
  - Noemi Gonzalez, actress
  - Matty Mullins, singer/songwriter and frontman for Memphis May Fire
- July 4 – Freddie Banks, football player and coach
- July 5 – Kellen Moore, football player and coach
- July 6
  - Carter Camper, ice hockey player
  - Adrian Clayborn, football player
  - Brittany Underwood, actress and singer
- July 7
  - Kaci Brown, singer/songwriter
  - Kristi Castlin, Olympic hurdler
  - Chase Williamson, actor and producer
- July 8
  - Ashley Bowyer, soccer player
  - Jordan Burroughs, Olympic wrestler
- July 9
  - Mark Angelosetti, wrestler
  - Belal Muhammad, mixed martial artist
- July 10
  - Antonio Brown, football player
  - Heather Hemmens, actress
  - Katie Pavlich, journalist, commentator, author, blogger, and podcaster
- July 11 – Christian Camacho, soccer player
- July 12
  - Patrick Beverley, basketball player
  - Christine Marie Cabanos, actress
  - Bryan Llenas, news correspondent
  - LeSean McCoy, football player
- July 13
  - Colton Haynes, actor and model
  - Chris Sheffield, actor
  - Steven R. McQueen, actor and model
- July 14
  - Kai Correa, baseball coach
  - Travis Ganong, Olympic alpine skier
  - Angela Lewis, actress and philanthropist
  - Chase Williamson, actor and film producer
- July 15 – Aimee Carrero, Dominican-born actress
- July 17
  - Summer Bishil, actress
  - Patrick Crosby, lacrosse player
  - Anderson East, musician
  - Luke Stocker, football player
- July 18 – Ambyr Childers, actress
- July 19
  - Shane Dawson, internet personality, actor, comedian, director, and author
  - Cherami Leigh, actress
  - Trent Williams, football player
- July 20
  - Phillip Adams, football player and killer (d. 2021)
  - Lucas Baiano, filmmaker
  - Quinton Carter, football player
  - Julianne Hough, ballroom dancer, country singer, and actress
  - Stephen Strasburg, baseball player
- July 21
  - Blake Allen, composer
  - Jon Asamoah, football player
  - Edawn Coughman, football player
  - DeAndre Jordan, basketball player
  - Nina Roth, Olympic curler
- July 22
  - Alex Caskey, soccer player
  - George Santos, politician
- July 23 – Kevin Tway, golfer
- July 24
  - Charlee Brooks, vocalist, composer, and audio engineer
  - Chris Cortez, soccer player
- July 25 – Linsey Godfrey, actress
- July 26
  - AJ Agazarm, mixed martial artist
  - Francia Raisa, actress
  - Caitlin Gerard, actress
  - George Santos, politician
- July 27
  - Luke Collis, football player
  - Lila Rose, activist
- July 28
  - Ayla Brown, basketball player and singer
  - Greg Hardy, football player
  - Nick Santino, singer/songwriter and frontman for A Rocket to the Moon (2006–2013)
- July 29 – Matthew Bouraee, soccer player
- July 30 – Nico Tortorella, actor and model
- July 31
  - Remy Banks, rapper
  - Kyra Harris Bolden, politician
  - Charlie Carver, actor
  - A. J. Green, football player
  - Krystal Meyers, singer/songwriter and musician

=== August ===
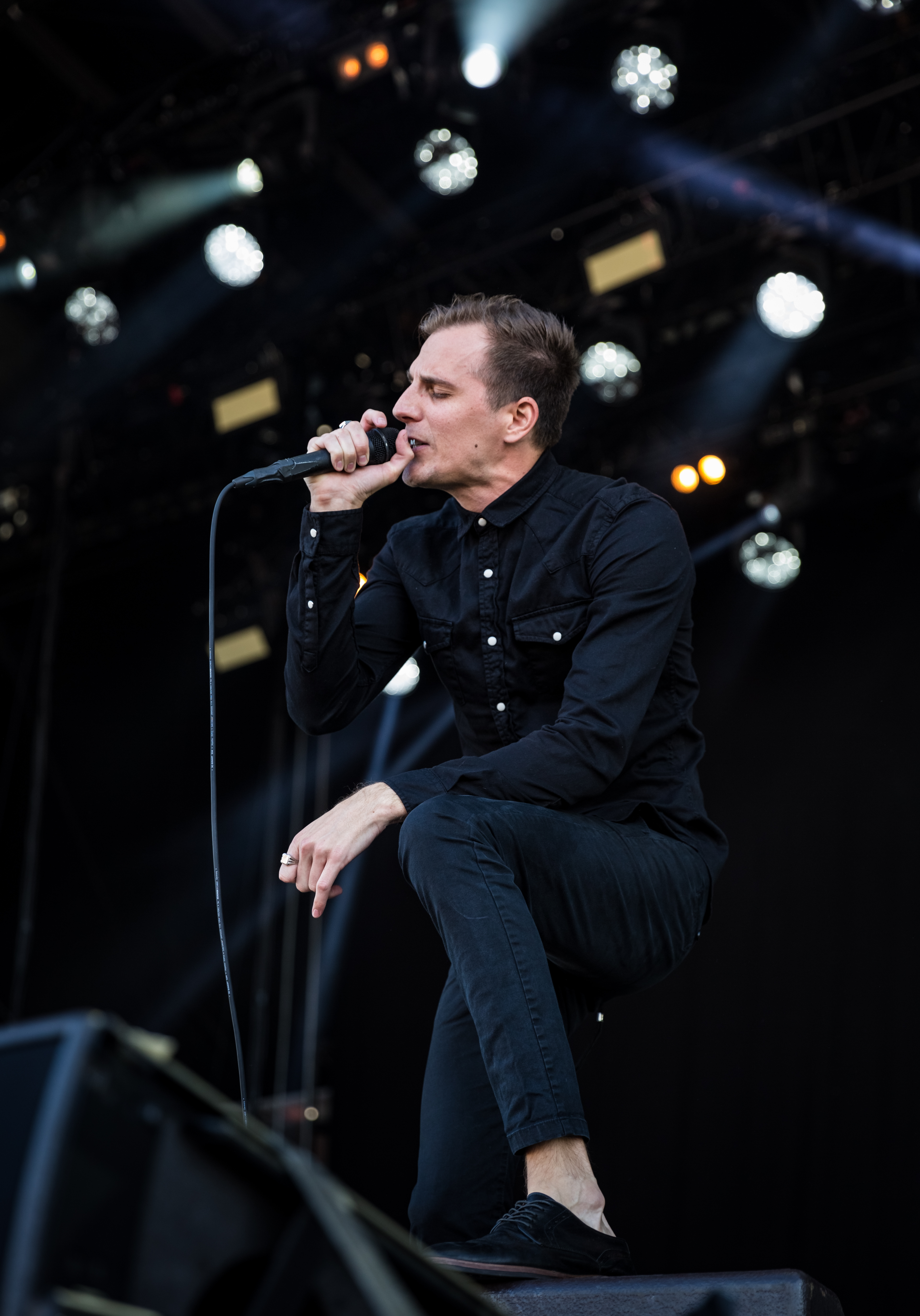
John O'Callaghan

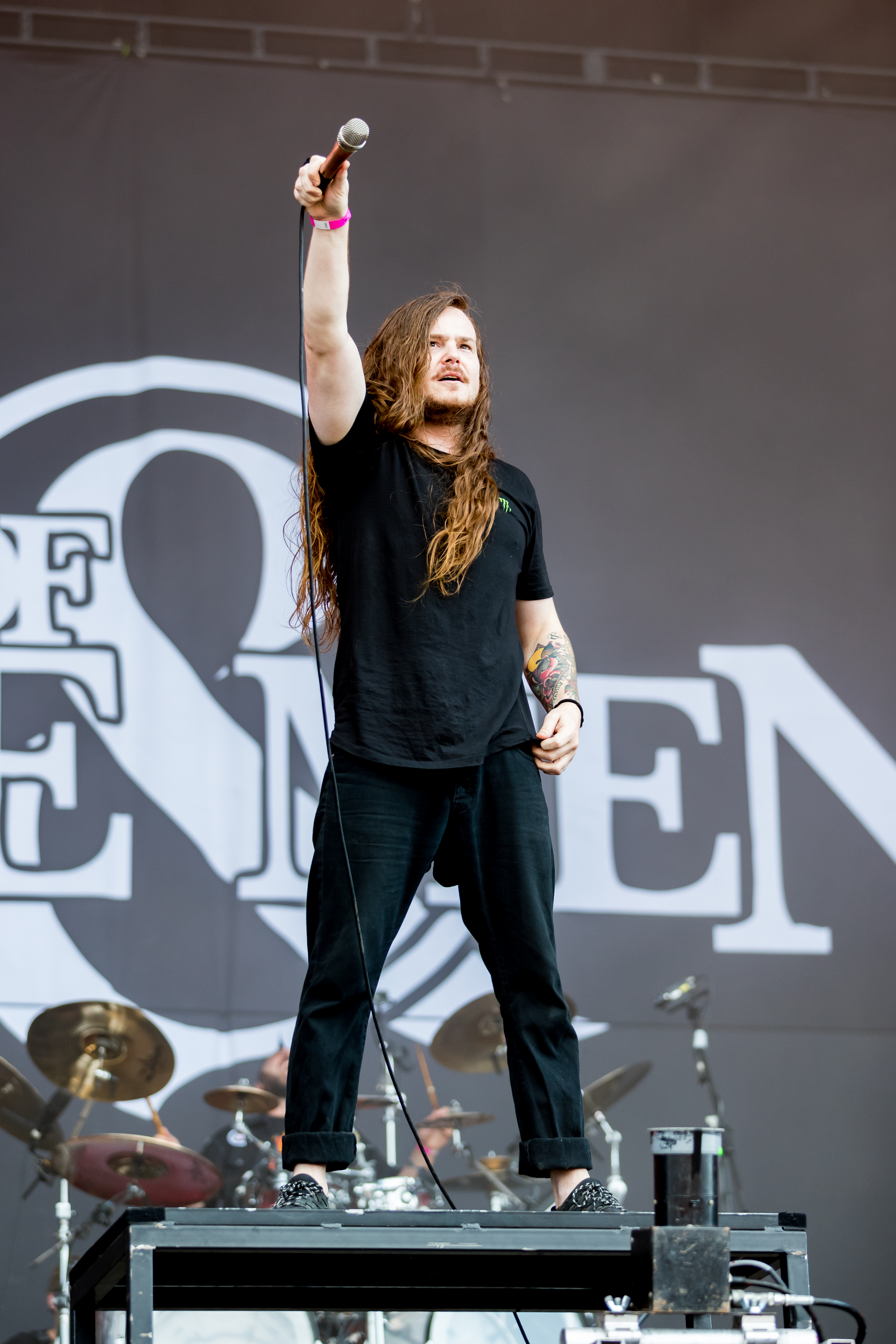
Aaron Pauley

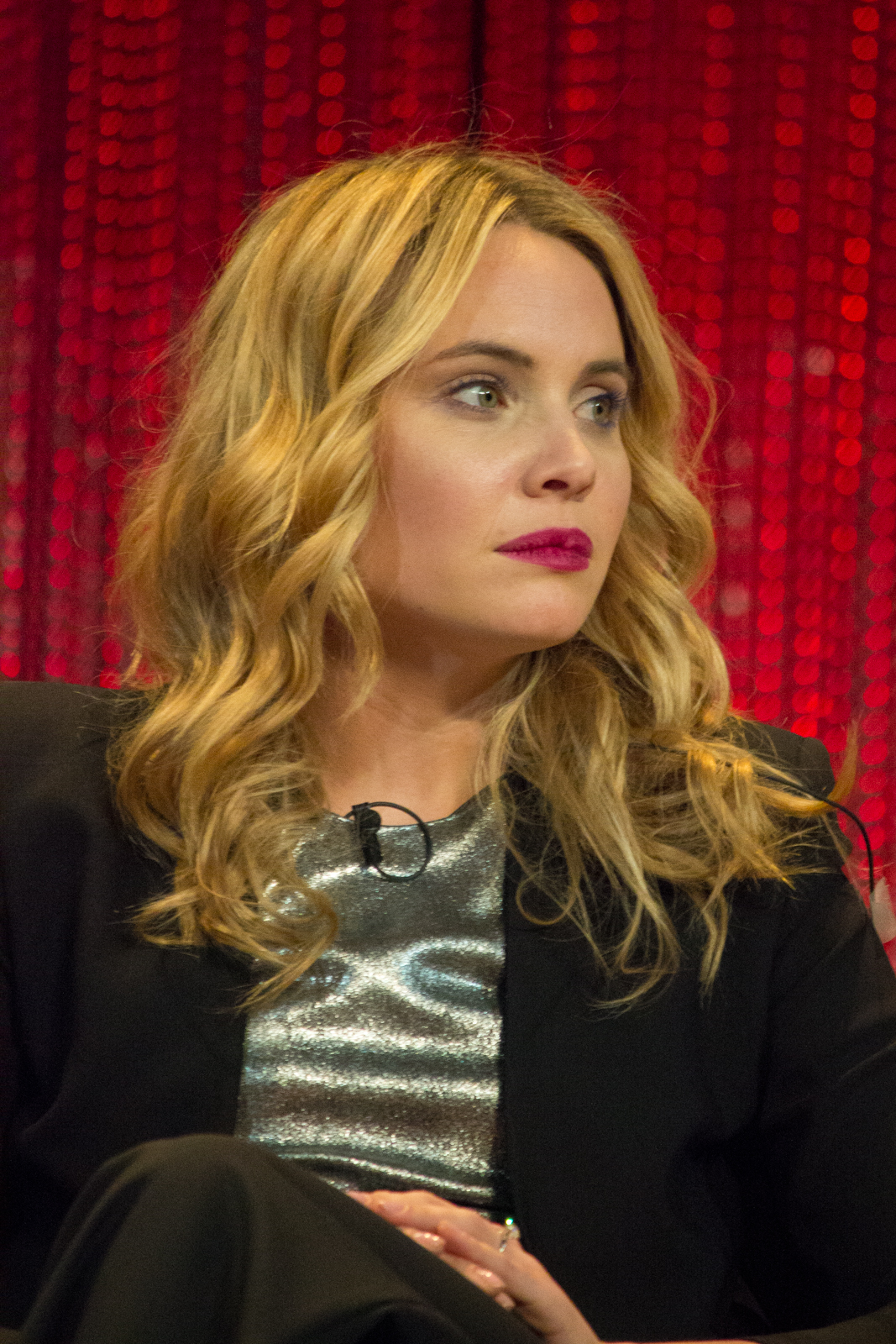
Leah Pipes

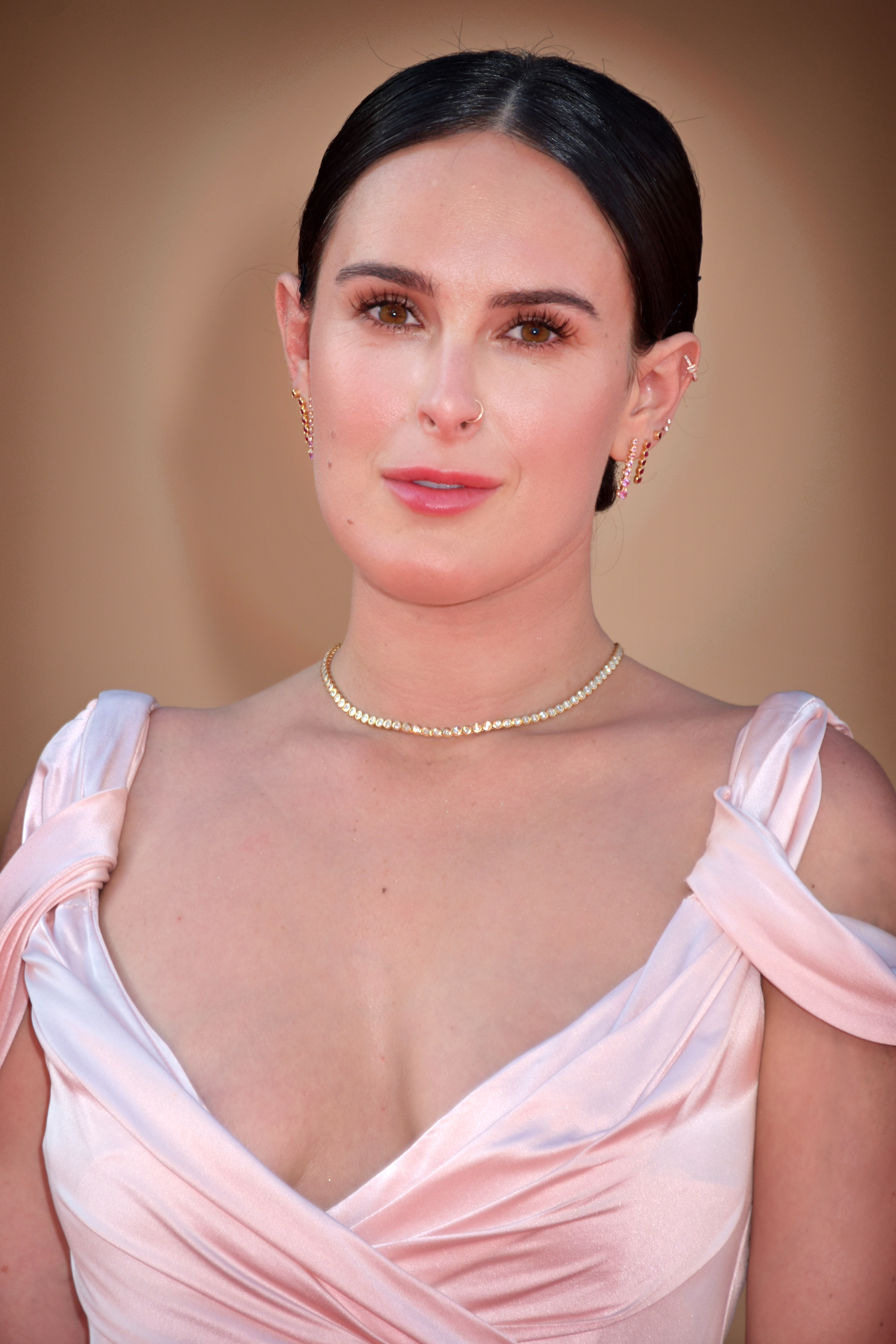
Rumer Willis

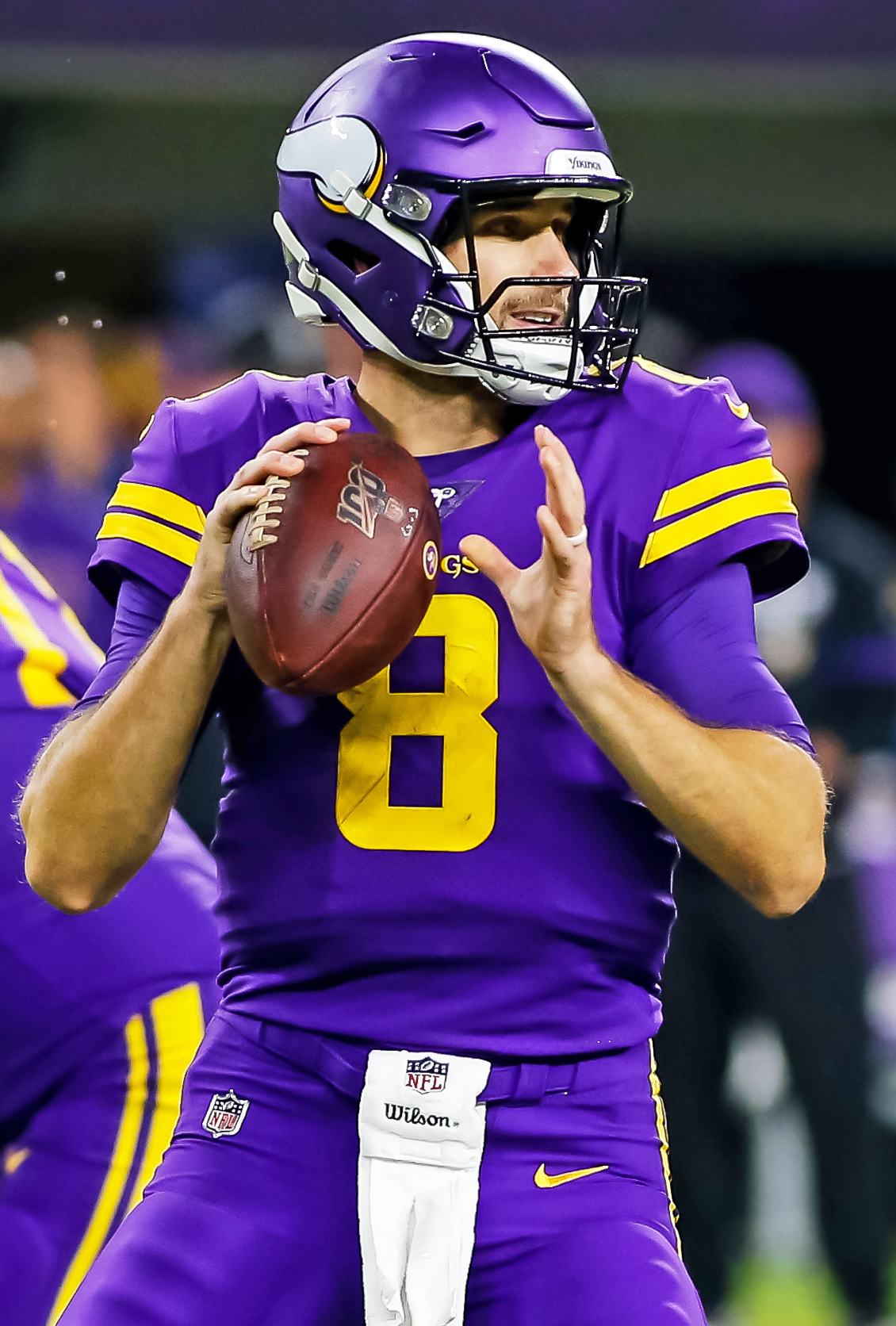
Kirk Cousins

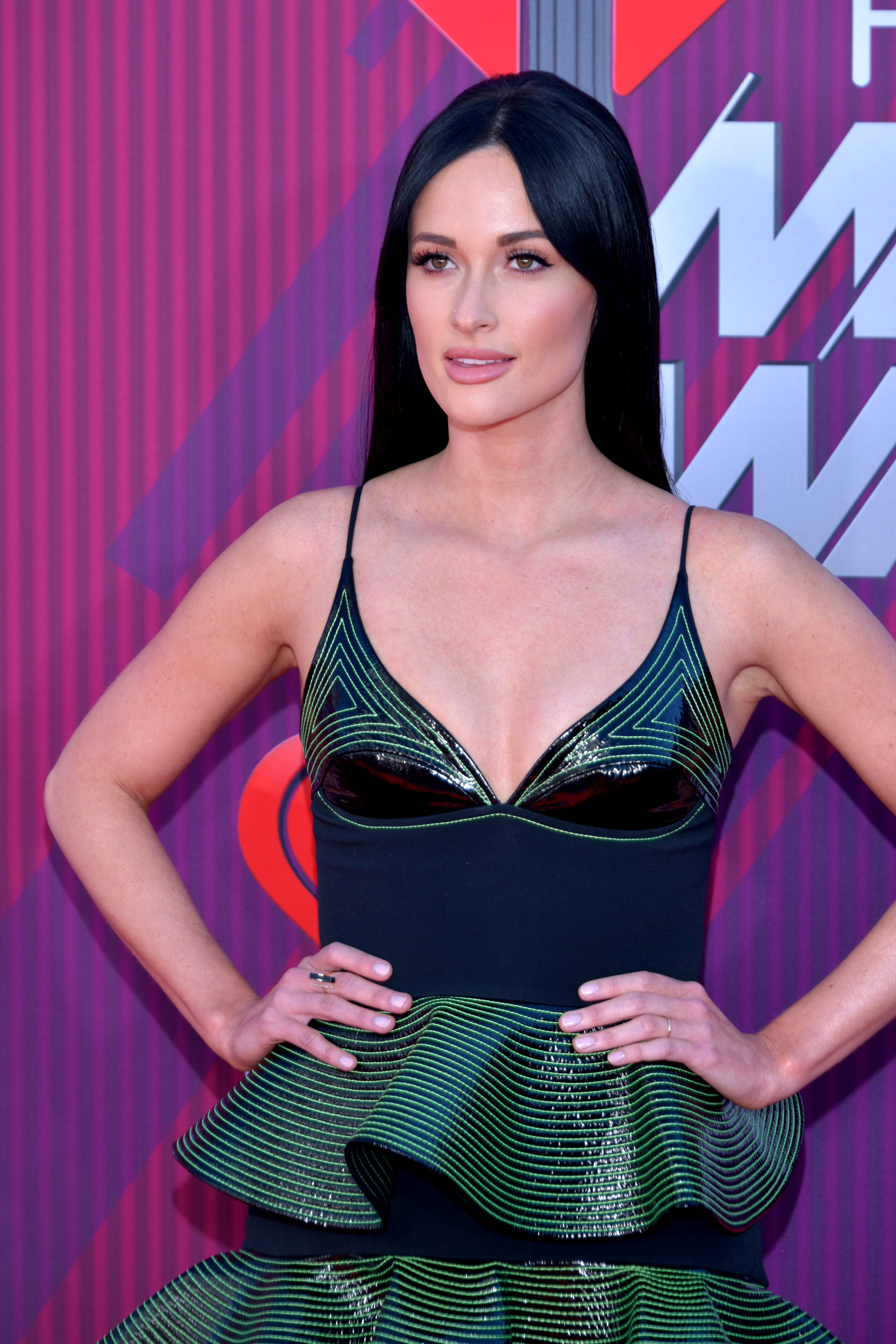
Kacey Musgraves

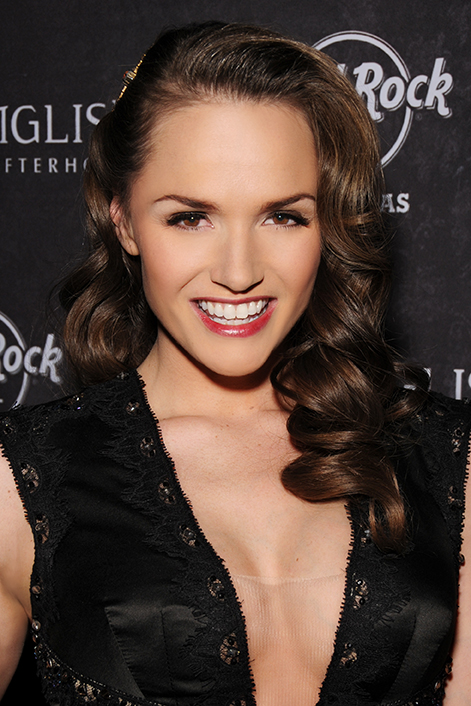
Tori Black

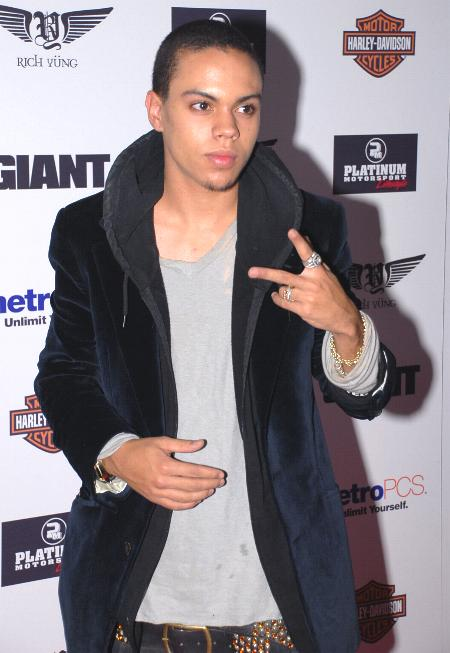
Evan Ross

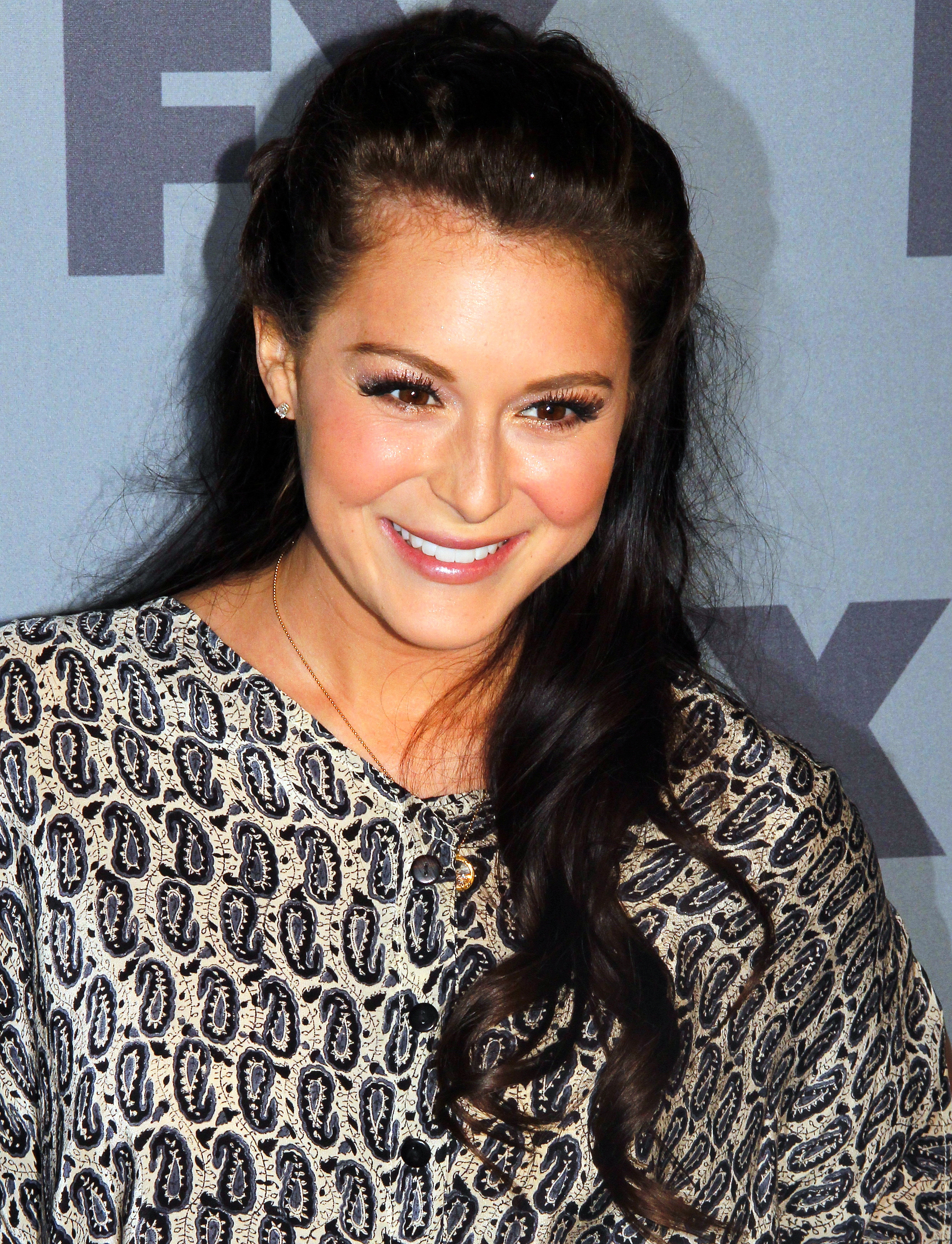
Alexa Vega

- August 1 – Max Carver, actor
- August 2 – Golden Tate, football player
- August 3
  - Amanda Bell, mixed martial artist
  - Ricky Blaze, DJ, producer, and singer/songwriter
  - DRAM, rapper and singer/songwriter
  - Weyes Blood, DJ, producer, and singer/songwriter
  - Christine Ko, actress
- August 4
  - John O'Callaghan, singer/songwriter and frontman for The Maine
  - Aaron Pauley, singer, bassist, and frontman for Of Mice & Men (2012–present) and Jamie's Elsewhere
- August 5
  - David Castain, entrepreneur and philanthropist
  - Salwa Aga Khan, fashion model and aristocrat
- August 6
  - Anthony Allen, football player
  - DaNae Couch, beauty pageant titleholder, Miss Texas 2012
- August 7
  - Danario Alexander, football player
  - Marti Belle, wrestler
  - Jordan Cameron, football player
- August 8
  - Eric Brakey, politician
  - Chris Cottrell, founder of The Reading Initiative
  - Tiana Coudray, Olympic equestrian and dancer
  - Chad Future, actor, director, singer, and host
  - Michael Tracey, commentator
  - Laura Slade Wiggins, actress, singer, and musician
- August 9
  - Anthony Castonzo, football player
  - Amber Guyger, murderer
- August 12
  - Mark Arcobello, ice hockey player
  - Justin Gaston, singer/songwriter, model, and actor
  - Leah Pipes, actress
- August 13
  - Keith Benson, basketball player
  - Nili Brosh, Israeli-born singer and guitarist
  - Servando Carrasco, soccer player
- August 14 – Kayla Mueller, humanitarian aid worker and murder victim (d. 2015)
- August 15 – Andy Miele, Olympic ice hockey player
- August 16
  - Boyfriend, singer/songwriter, producer, rapper, and performance artist
  - Nate Cohn, journalist and political analyst
  - Ryan Kerrigan, football player
  - Rumer Willis, actress and singer
  - Parker Young, actor
- August 17
  - Bianca Collins, actress, curator, and writer
  - Brady Corbet, actor and filmmaker
  - Tino Coury, singer/songwriter
  - Chris Culliver, football player
  - Joyner Lucas, rapper
  - Kathryn Morgan, ballerina
- August 18
  - Jorge Avila-Torrez, convicted serial killer and rapist
  - Scout Bassett, Chinese-born Paralympic long jumper
- August 19
  - Ty Abbott, basketball player
  - Hoodie Allen, hip-hop artist
  - Kirk Cousins, football player
  - Veronica Roth, author
  - Romeo Miller, basketball player, rapper, actor
- August 20
  - Jerryd Bayless, basketball player
  - Lincoln A. Castellanos, actor
- August 21
  - Paris Bennett, singer and American Idol contestant
  - Kacey Musgraves, country singer
- August 22 – Javy Ayala, mixed martial artist
- August 23
  - Jaime Churches, politician
  - Jeremy Lin, basketball player
  - Kim Matula, actress
- August 24 – Nicholas Alexander, Olympic ski jumper
- August 25
  - Terrence Austin, football player
  - Caleb Bostic, football player
  - Tony Cosentino, stock car racing driver
- August 26
  - Elvis Andrus, Venezuelan-born baseball player
  - Lance Benoist, mixed martial artist
  - Tori Black, pornographic actress
  - Evan Ross, actor and musician
  - Tom Coolican, American-born Australian rugby player
  - Danielle Savre, actress and singer
- August 27
  - A. J. Achter, baseball player
  - Sean Chen, pianist
  - Zach Collaros, football player
  - Alexa Vega, actress and singer
- August 28
  - Danny Aiken, football player
  - Shalita Grant, actress
- August 30
  - Alex Corbisiero, American-born English rugby player
  - Jordan Rodgers, sports commentator, television personality, and football player
- August 31
  - Matt Adams, baseball player
  - Athena, wrestler
  - Allen Bradford, football player
  - Tanaya Henry, model and actress

=== September ===
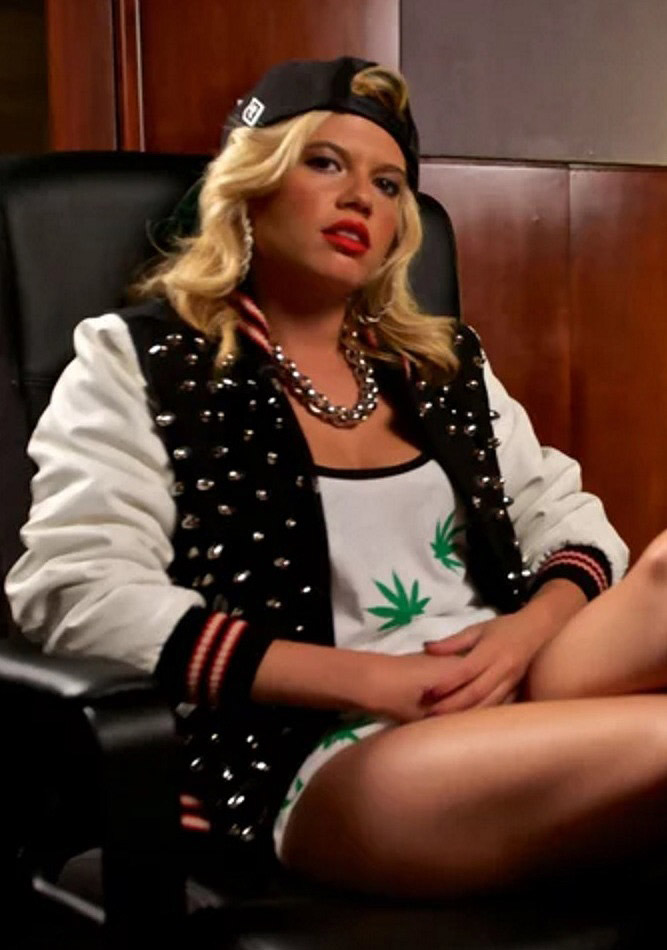
Chanel West Coast

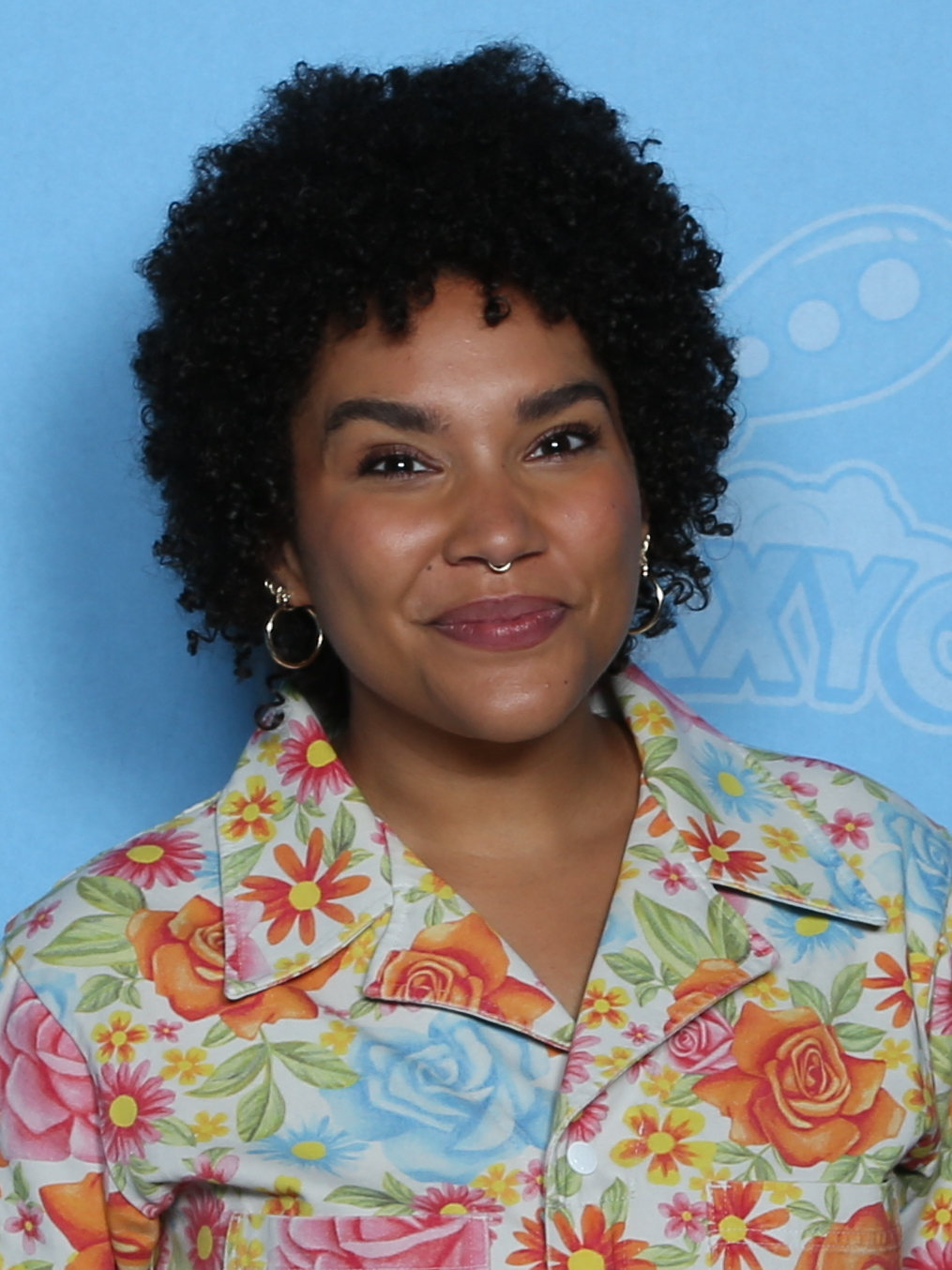
Emmy Raver-Lampman

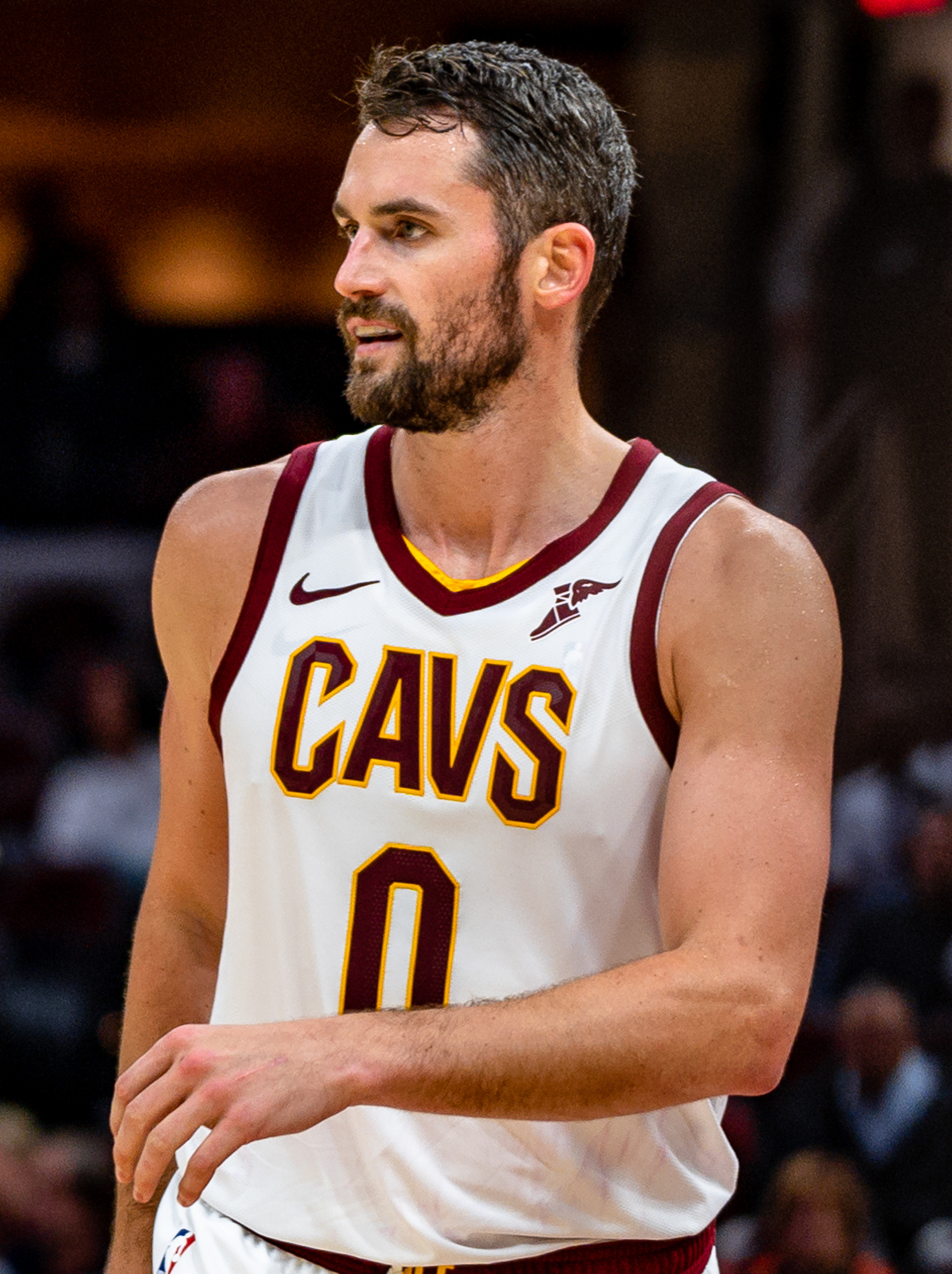
Kevin Love

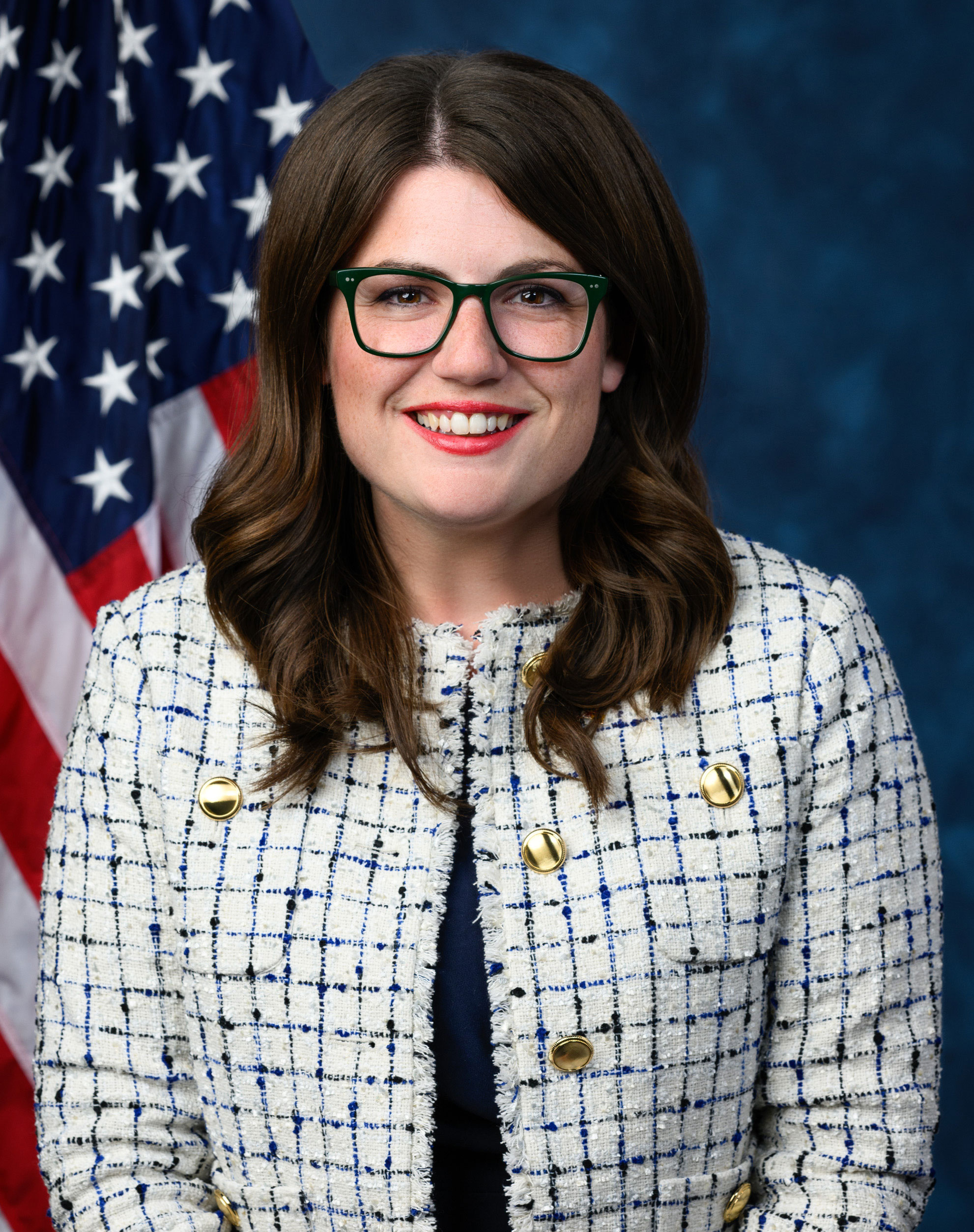
Sarah Elfreth

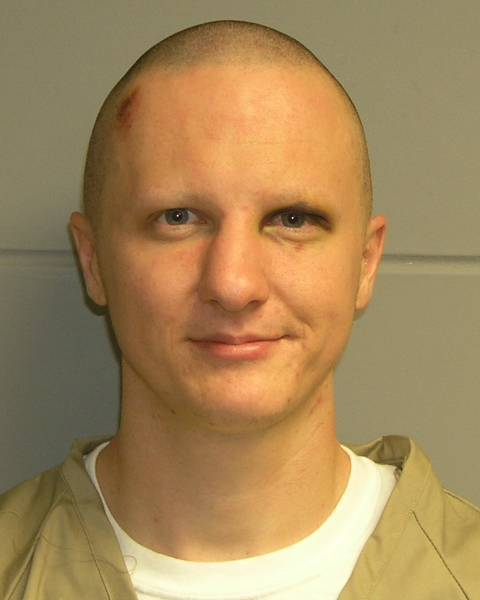
Jared Lee Loughner

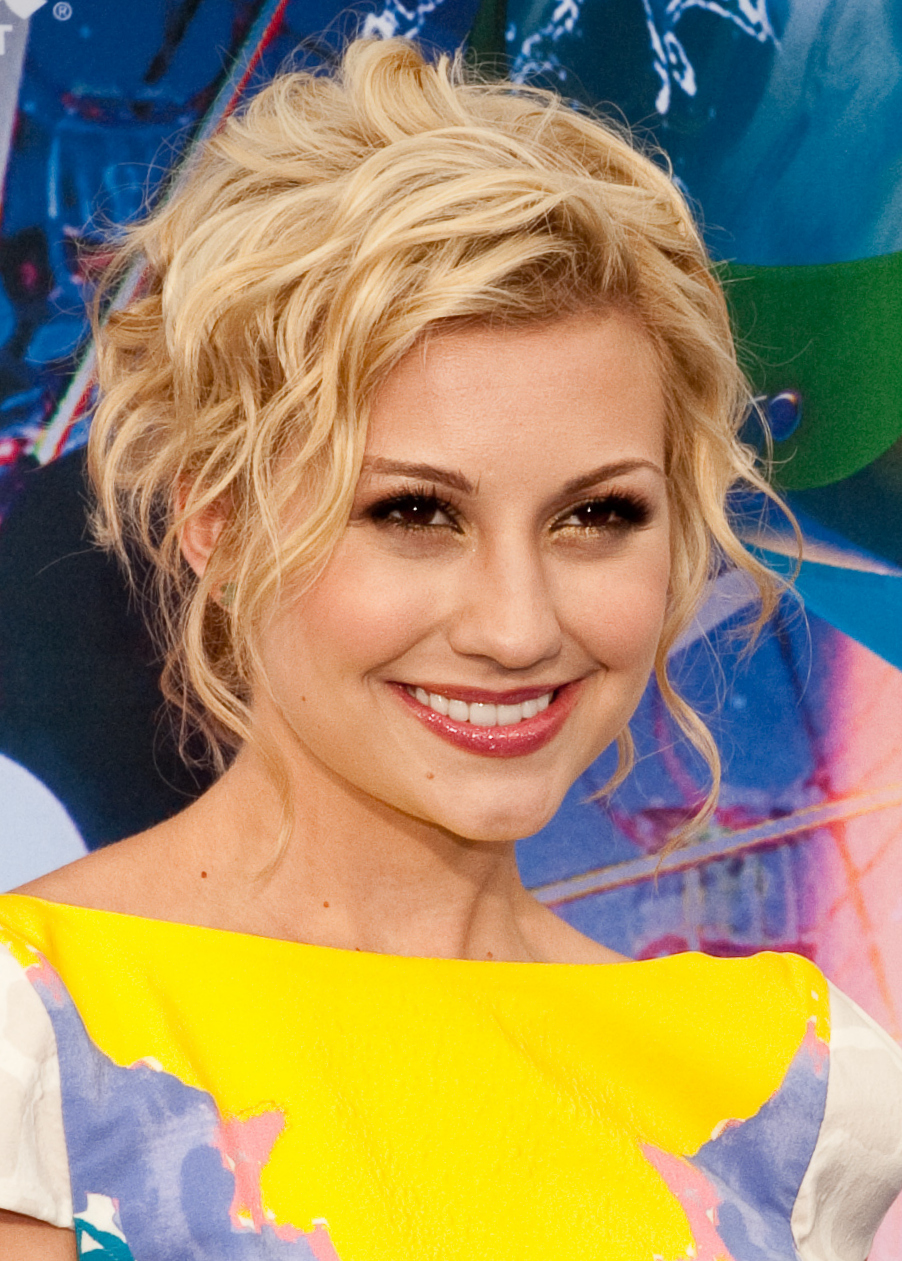
Chelsea Kane

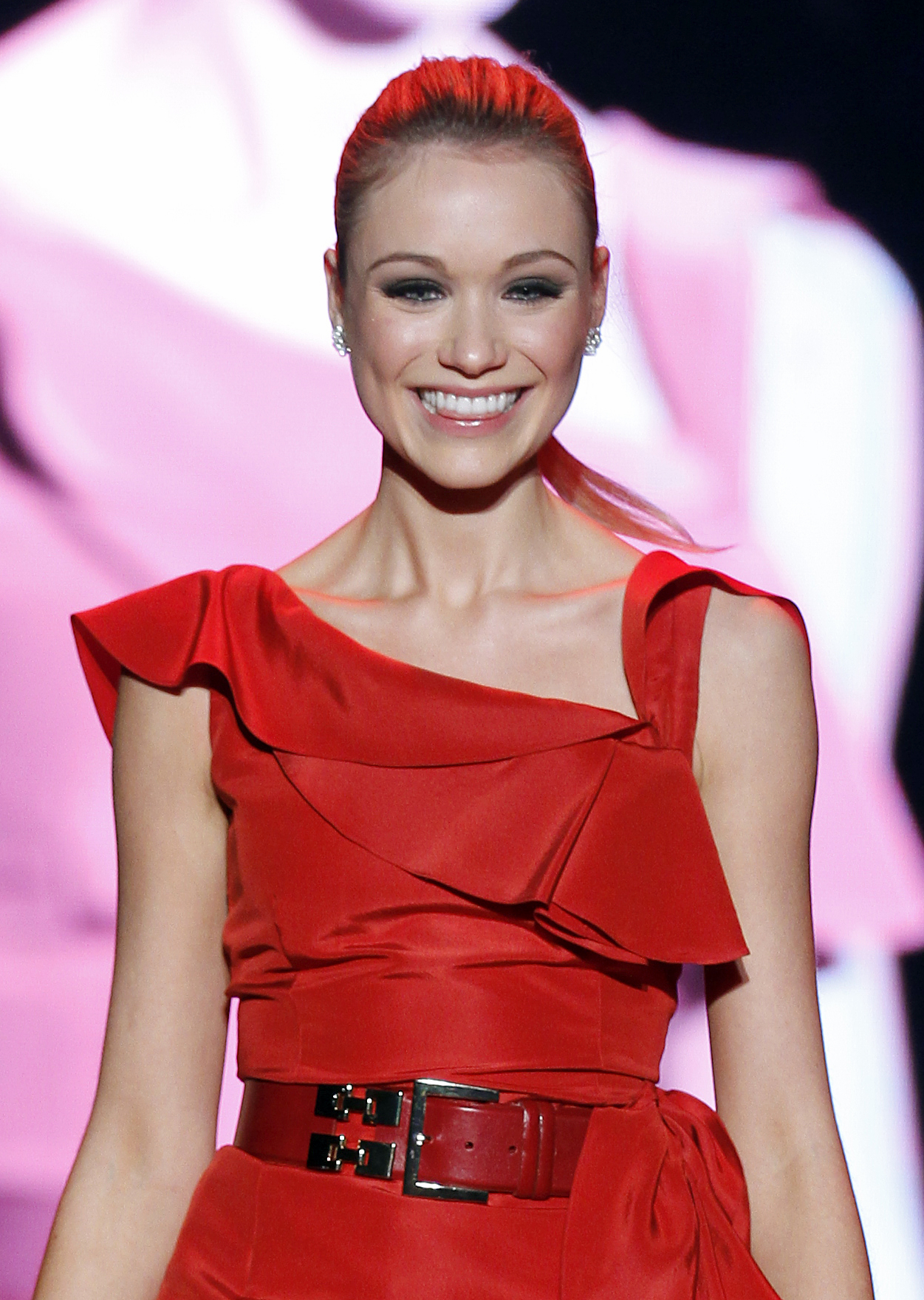
Katrina Bowden

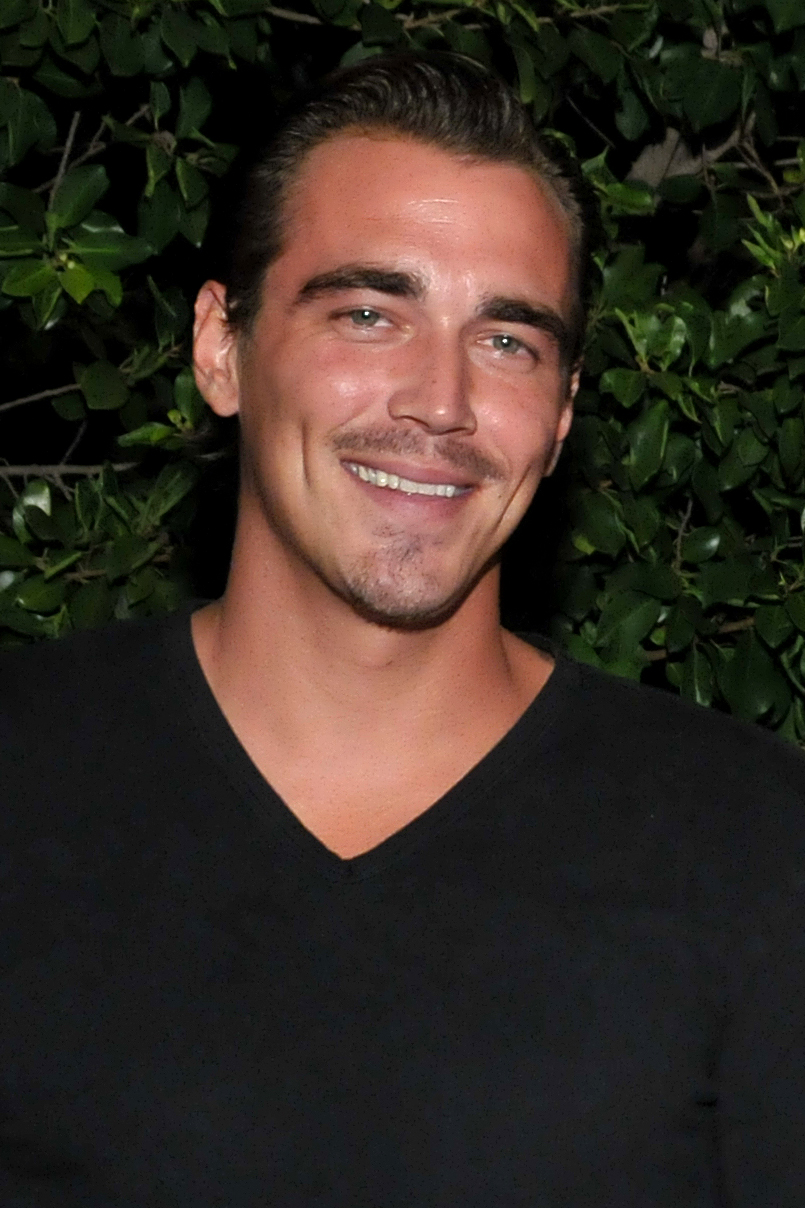
Clark James Gable

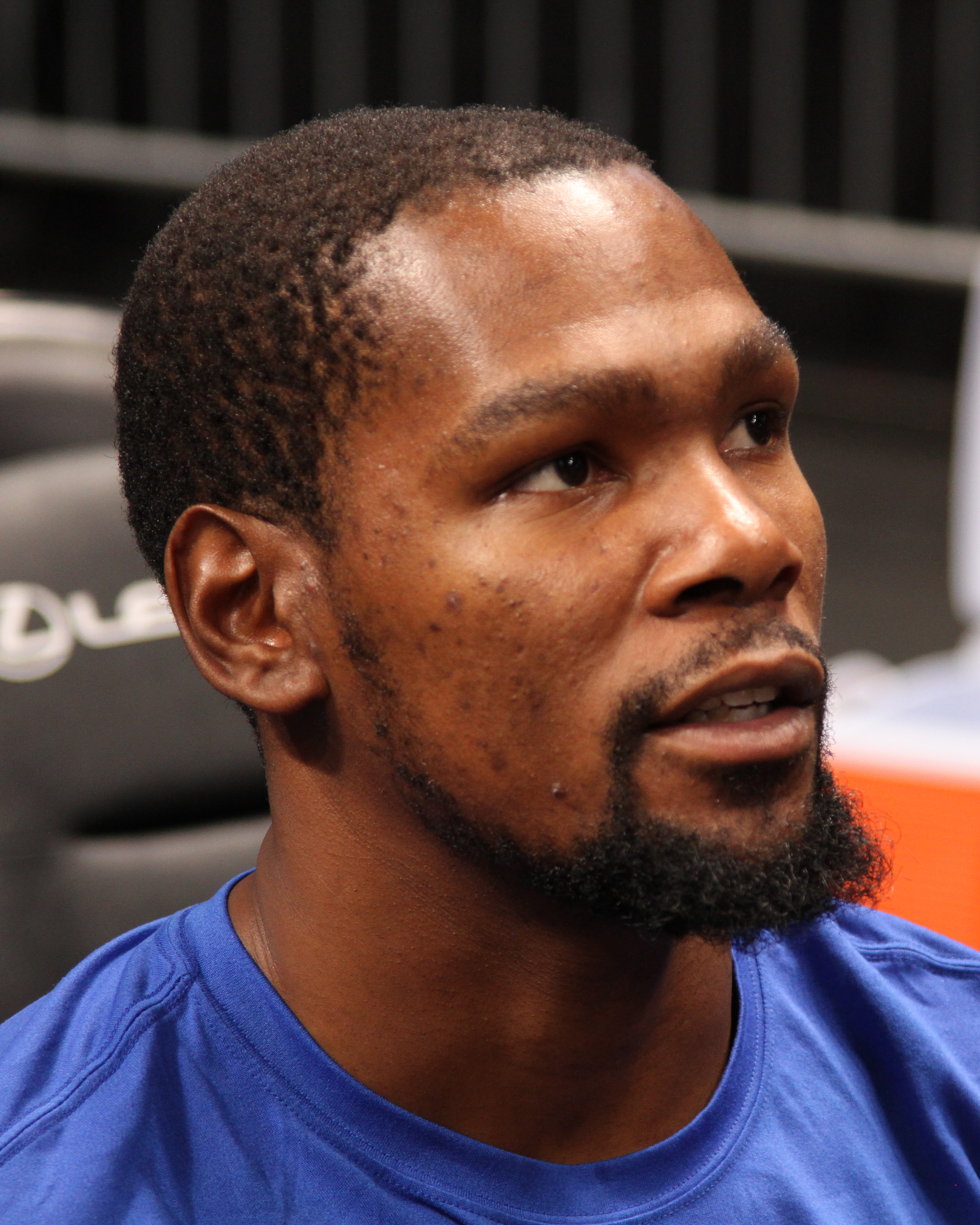
Kevin Durant

- September 1
  - Gabriel Ferrari, soccer player
  - Chanel West Coast, rapper, singer, actress, model, and television personality
- September 2 – Matt Wentworth, guitarist and vocalist for Our Last Night
- September 3
  - Katie Bethke, soccer player
  - Derwin Montgomery, politician
- September 4
  - Pilar Bosley, ice dancer
  - Kervin Bristol, Haitian-born basketball player
  - Anna Li, gymnast
- September 5
  - Ibrahim Abdulai, football player
  - Raquel Pennington, mixed martial artist
  - Emmy Raver-Lampman, actress and singer
- September 6
  - Sam Acho, football player
  - Jovan Adepo, British-born actor
- September 7
  - Kevin Aguilar, mixed martial artist
  - Jack Crawford, football player
  - Paul Iacono, actor
  - Kevin Love, basketball player
- September 8
  - Arrelious Benn, football player
  - E. J. Bonilla, actor
  - Rob Bunker, stock car racing driver
- September 9
  - Gary Brown, baseball player
  - Roc Carmichael, football player
  - Sarah Elfreth, politician
  - McKey Sullivan, fashion model
- September 10
  - Queen Claye, Olympic hurdler and sprinter
  - Jared Lee Loughner, convicted spree killer (2011 Tucson shooting)
- September 11 – Mike Moustakas, baseball player
- September 13
  - Nadia Aboulhosn, fashion blogger, model, and designer
  - John Park, singer
- September 14 – Bobby Brackins, rapper
- September 15
  - Kent Bulle, golfer
  - Chelsea Kane, actress and singer
  - Chloe Dykstra, actress
- September 16
  - Talor Battle, basketball player
  - Durand Bernarr, singer/songwriter and producer
  - Corben Bone, soccer player
  - B. J. Coleman, football player
  - Teddy Geiger, singer/songwriter
- September 18
  - Arizona Muse, model
  - Shoshana Bush, actress
  - Wesley Carroll, football player
  - Casey Crosby, baseball player
- September 21
  - Doug Baldwin, football player
  - Melvin Gregg, actor, model, and comedian
- September 19
  - Katrina Bowden, actress
  - Kenny Britt, football player
- September 20 – Clark James Gable, actor, model, and television presenter (d. 2019)
- September 21 – Doug Baldwin, football player
- September 22
  - Colin Braun, stock car racing driver
  - Bethany Dillon, contemporary Christian music artist
- September 23
  - Antonio Allen, football player
  - Mindy Cook, Paralympic goalball player
- September 24
  - Lisa Belcastro, politician
  - Curtis Brown, football player
  - Paul Carey, ice hockey player
  - Steven Kampfer, Olympic ice hockey player
  - Kyle Sullivan, actor
- September 26
  - Sadam Ali, boxer
  - Chris Archer, baseball player
  - Joanne Nosuchinsky, actress, television personality, and beauty pageant titleholder
- September 28 – Olivia Jordan, actress, model, television host, and Miss USA 2015
- September 29
  - Jeff Attinella, soccer player
  - Kevin Durant, basketball player
  - Justin Nozuka, American-born Canadian singer/songwriter

=== October ===
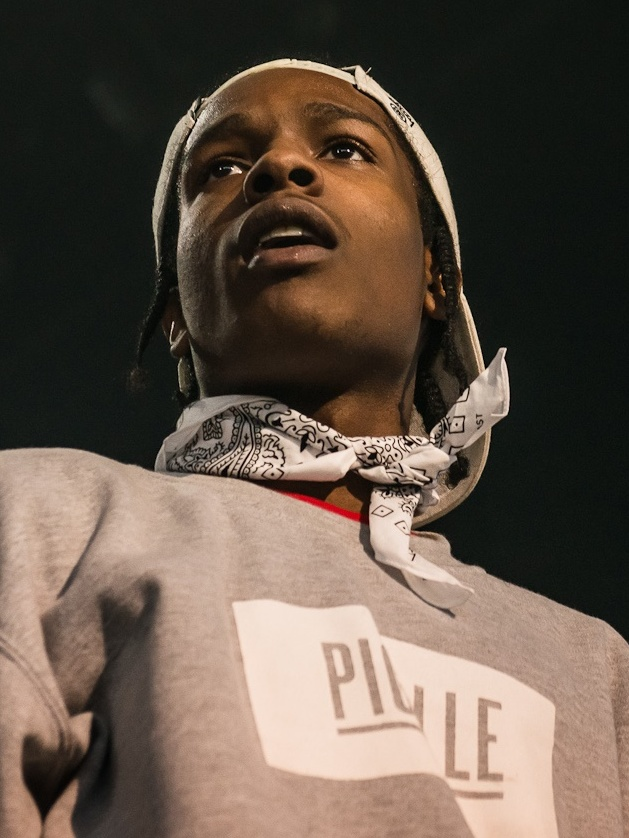
A$AP Rocky

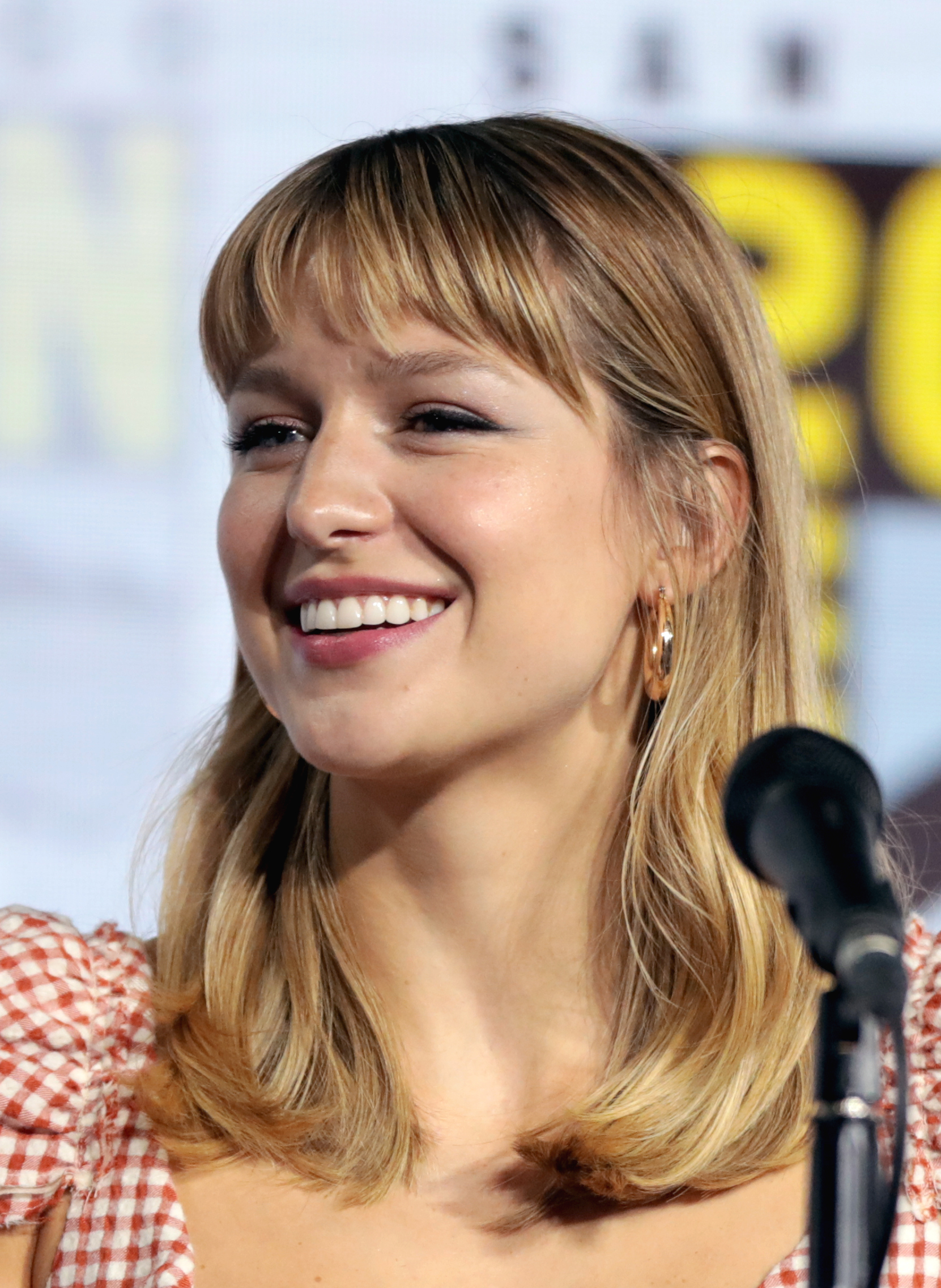
Melissa Benoist

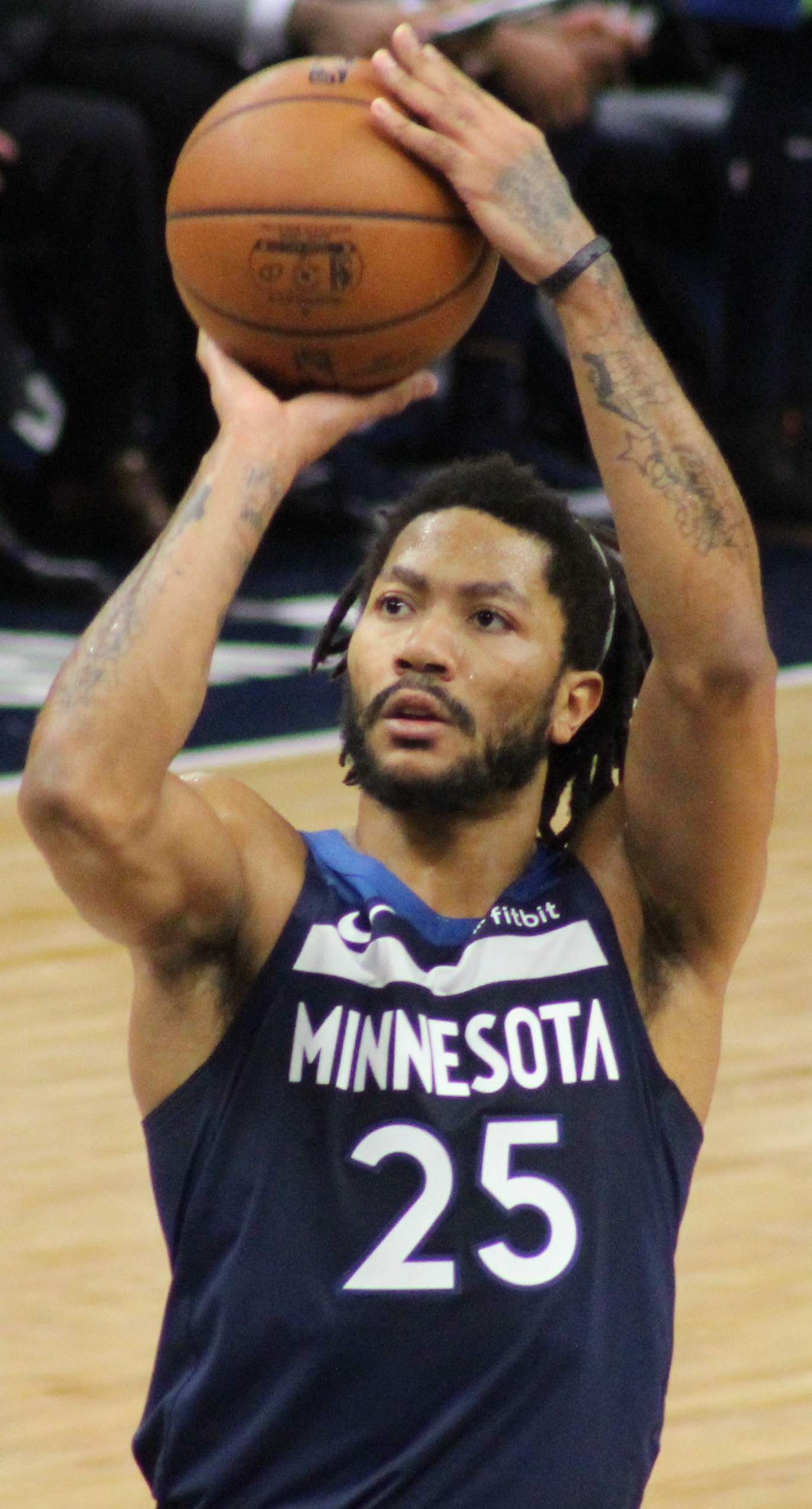
Derrick Rose

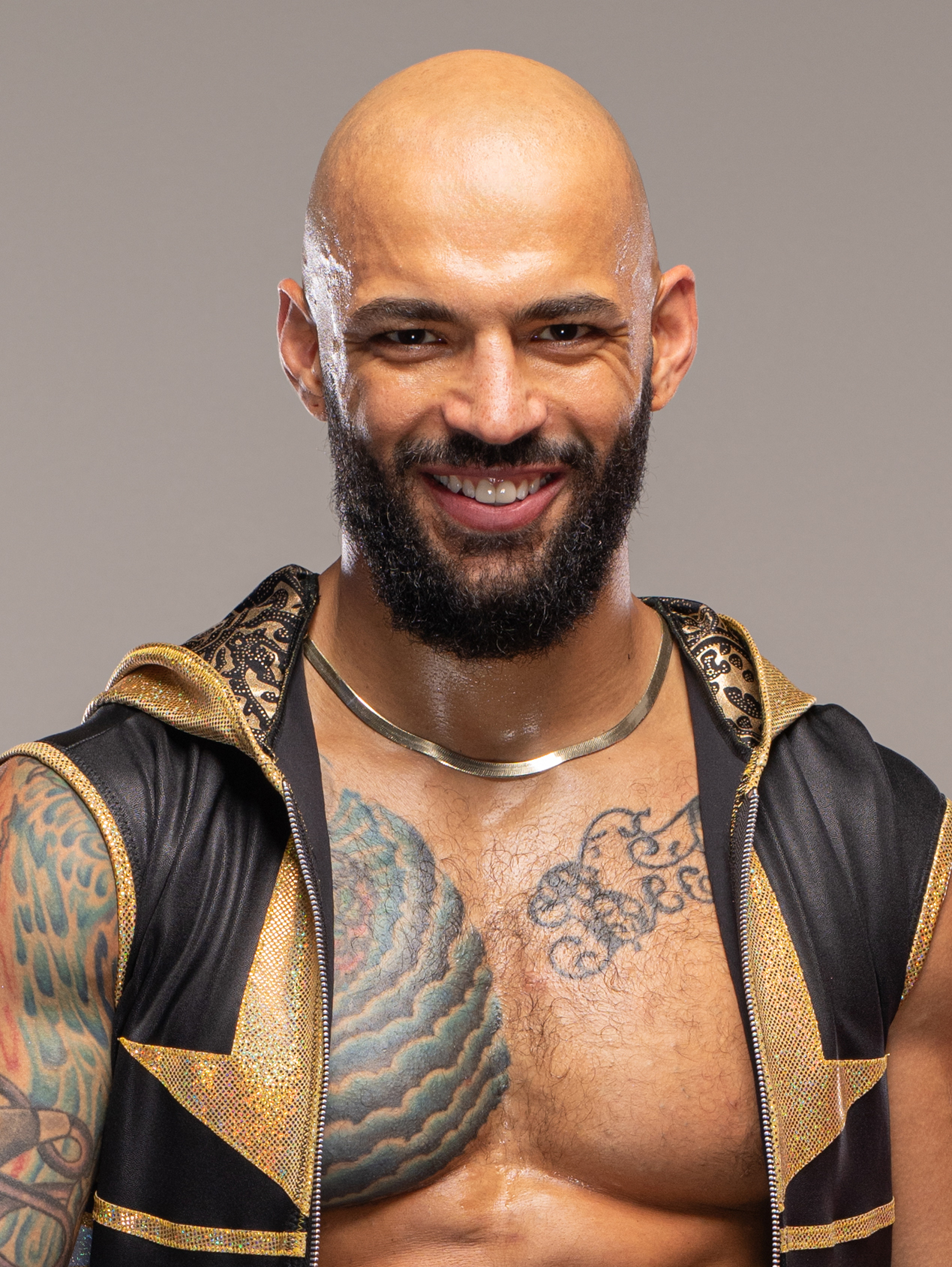
Ricochet

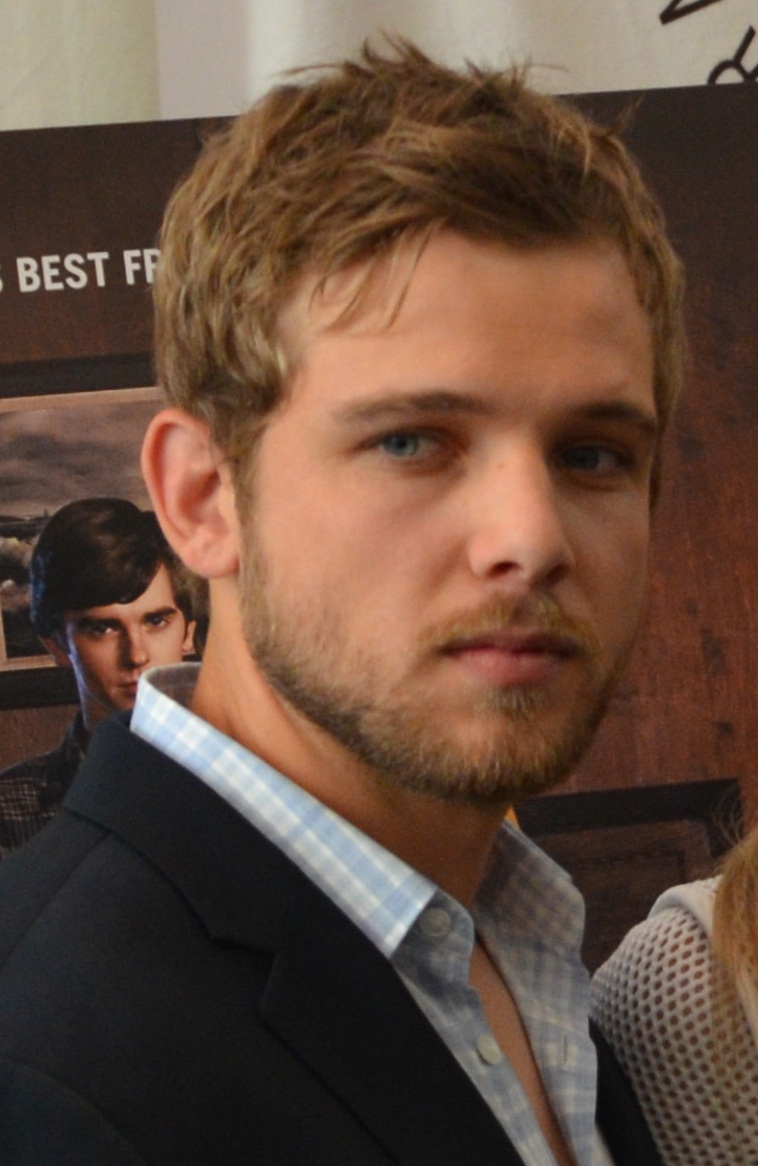
Max Thieriot

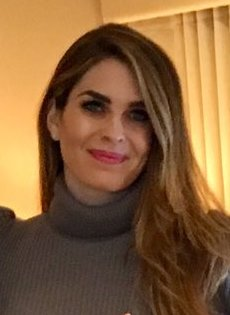
Hope Hicks

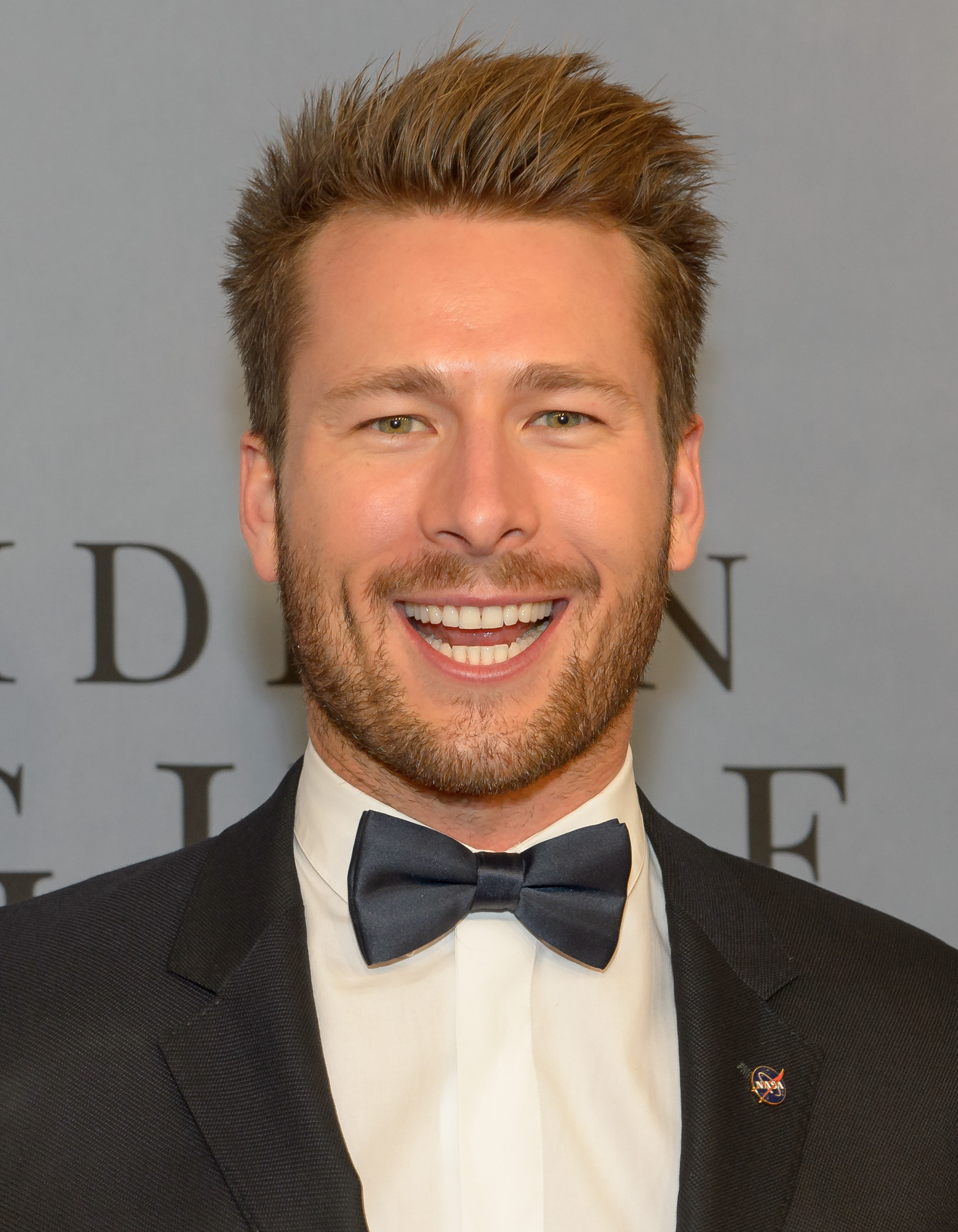
Glen Powell

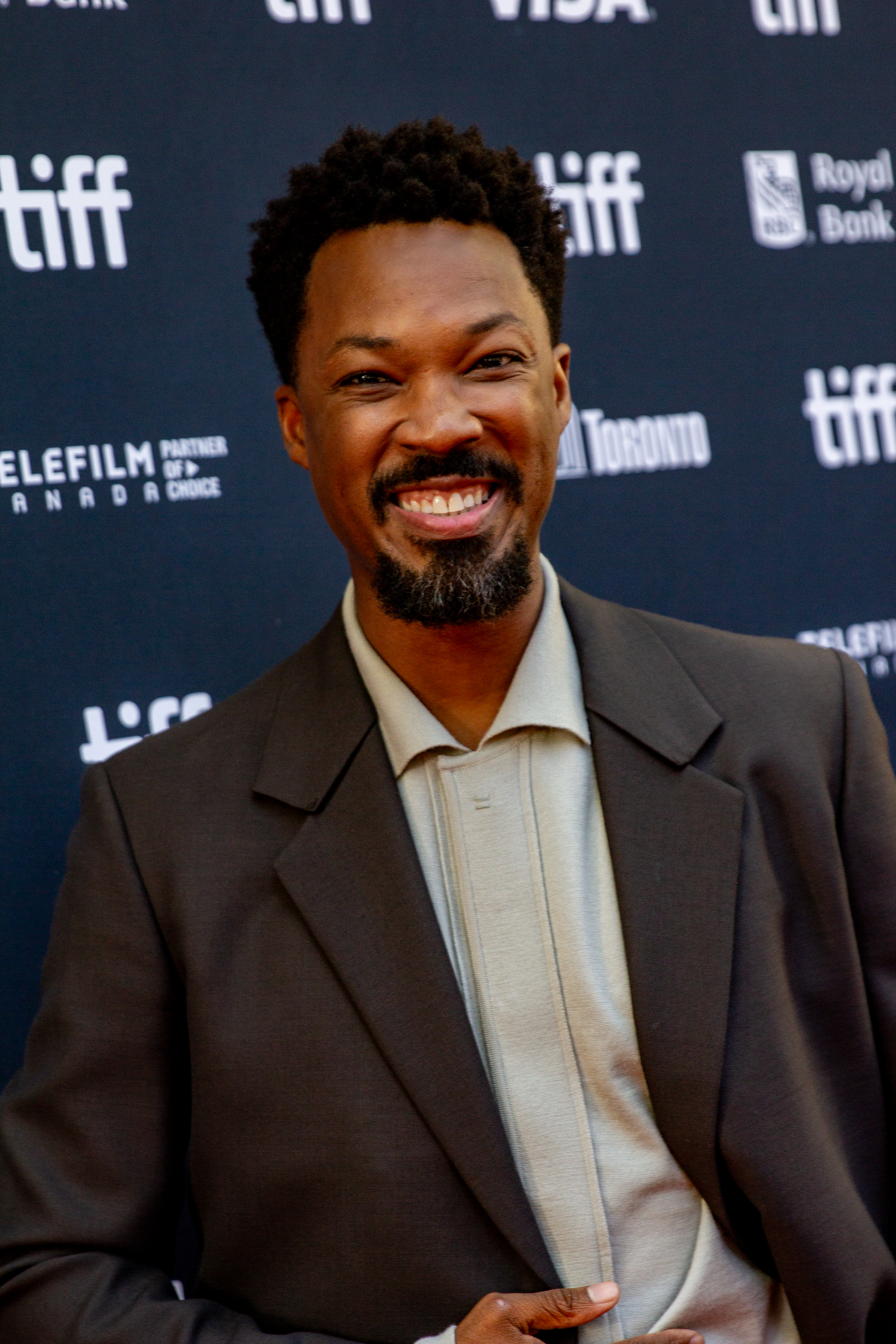
Corey Hawkins

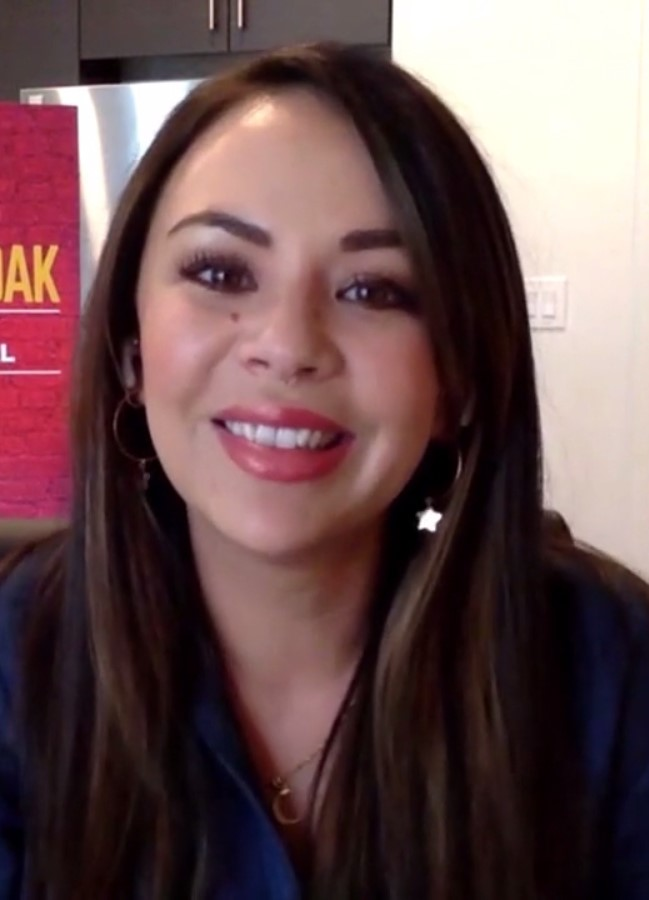
Janel Parrish

- October 1
  - Marjorie Conrad, French-born filmmaker and model
  - Nick Whitaker, actor
- October 2
  - Corrin Campbell, vocalist, bassist, songwriter, and pianist
  - Brittany Howard, musician
  - Laura Rutledge, sportscaster and beauty pageant titleholder
- October 3
  - A$AP Rocky, rapper and music video director
  - Mike Belfiore, baseball player
  - Lauren McKnight, actress
- October 4
  - Melissa Benoist, actress and singer
  - Sean Cattouse, football player
  - Lonnie Chisenhall, baseball player
  - Derrick Rose, basketball player
- October 5 – Kevin Olusola, a cappella singer and member of Pentatonix
- October 6
  - Bryan Anger, football player
  - Austin Berry, soccer player
- October 7
  - Katie Burnett, racewalker
  - Chimdi Chekwa, football player
  - Brandon Cunniff, baseball player
- October 8 – Manny Barreda, American-born Mexican baseball player
- October 9
  - John Chiles, football player
  - Amanda Serrano, martial artist
- October 10
  - Claudine Beckford, Jamaican-born cricketer
  - Alex Chappell, journalist
- October 11
  - Toney Clemons, football player
  - Ricochet, wrestler
- October 12 – Jermie Calhoun, football player
- October 13 – Norris Cole, basketball player
- October 14
  - Max Thieriot, actor
  - MacKenzie Mauzy, actress
  - Pia Toscano, singer and American Idol contestant
- October 15 – Leah Cole Allen, politician
- October 16
  - Tumua Anae, water polo player
  - Ron Brooks, football player
- October 17
  - Kathleen Alcott, novelist
  - Donald Butler, football player
  - Justin Clark, soccer player
  - Christina Crawford, wrestler
  - Dee Jay Daniels, actor
- October 18
  - Kyle Austin, basketball player
  - Dane Cameron, racing driver
  - Riley Green, country singer/songwriter and actor
- October 19
  - Xavier Alexander, basketball player
  - Jalil Anibaba, soccer player
- October 20
  - ASAP Ferg, rapper
  - Mario Butler, football player
  - Anthony Sabatini, politician
- October 21
  - Marguerite Bennett, comic book writer
  - Andrew Cancio, boxer
  - ContraPoints, YouTuber
  - Hope Hicks, public relations consultant and White House communications director
  - Glen Powell, Actor
- October 22
  - Marqus Blakely, basketball player
  - Corey Hawkins, actor
- October 23
  - Nia Ali, Olympic hurdler and heptathlete
  - Jake Collier, mixed martial artist
  - Jordan Crawford, basketball player
- October 24
  - Nastassja Bolívar, American-born Nicaraguan beauty pageant titleholder, Miss Nicaragua 2013
  - Jeremy Cota, freestyle skier
- October 25
  - Chase Buford, basketball player and coach
  - Alberto Cabrera, baseball player
- October 26 – JulienHimself, Swiss-born motivational speaker
- October 27 – Evan Turner, basketball player
- October 28 – Ian Conyers, politician
- October 29
  - Cortez Allen, football player
  - Deidre Behar, writer, producer, and host
  - Kat Timpf, columnist and reporter
- October 30 – Janel Parrish, actress and singer
- October 31
  - Cole Aldrich, basketball player
  - Conroy Black, football player
  - Jennie Clark, soccer player

=== November ===
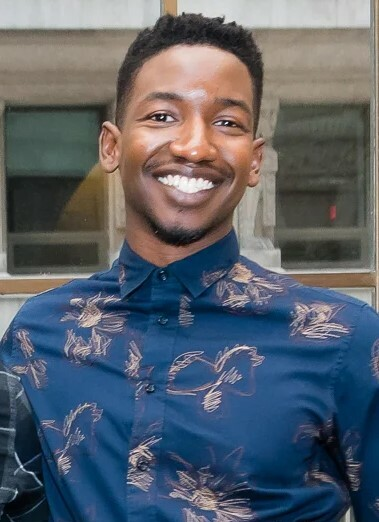
Mamoudou Athie

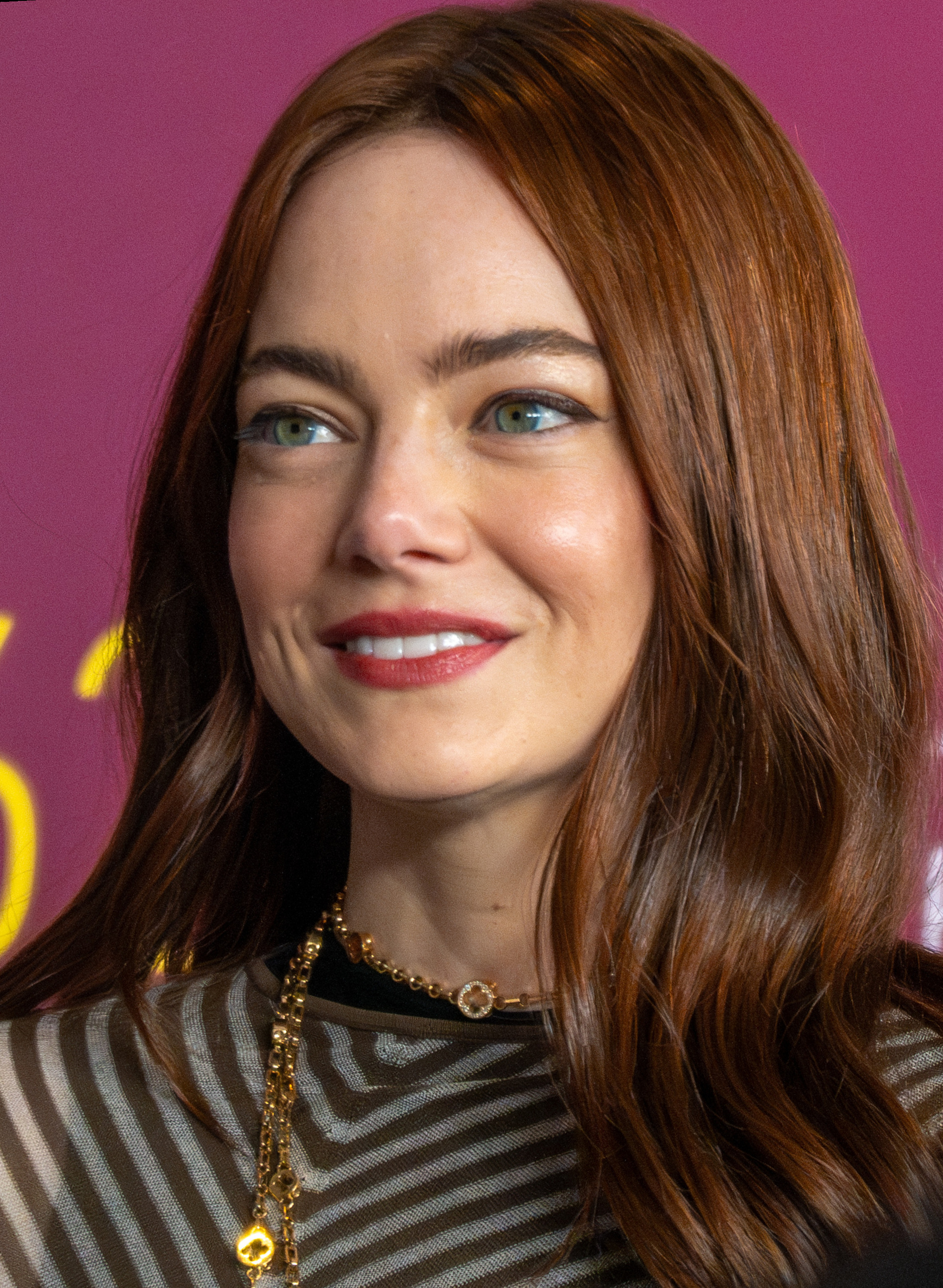
Emma Stone

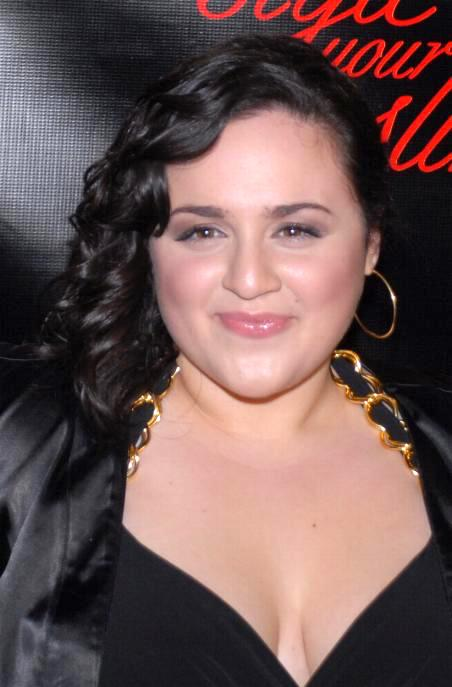
Nikki Blonsky

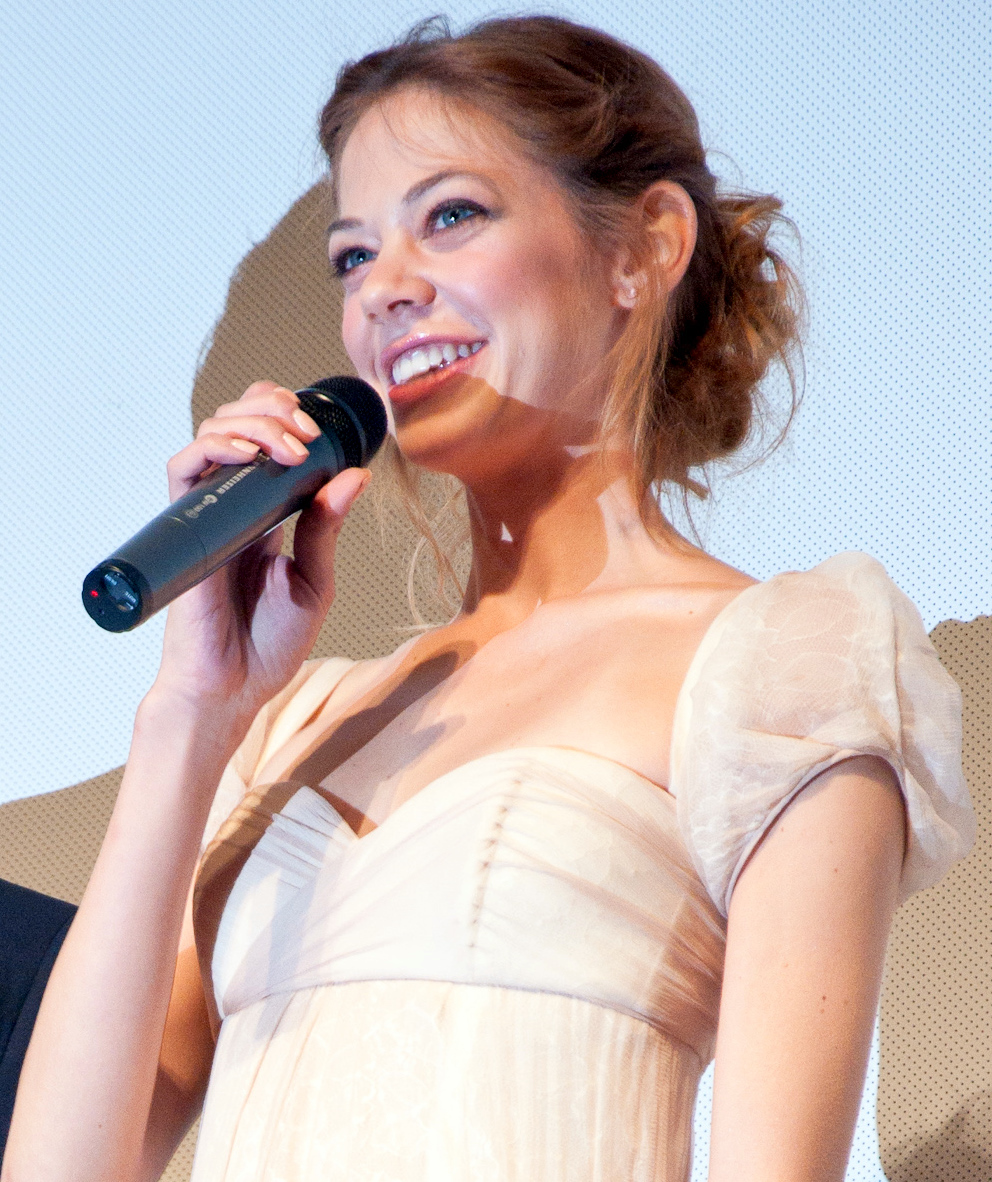
Analeigh Tipton

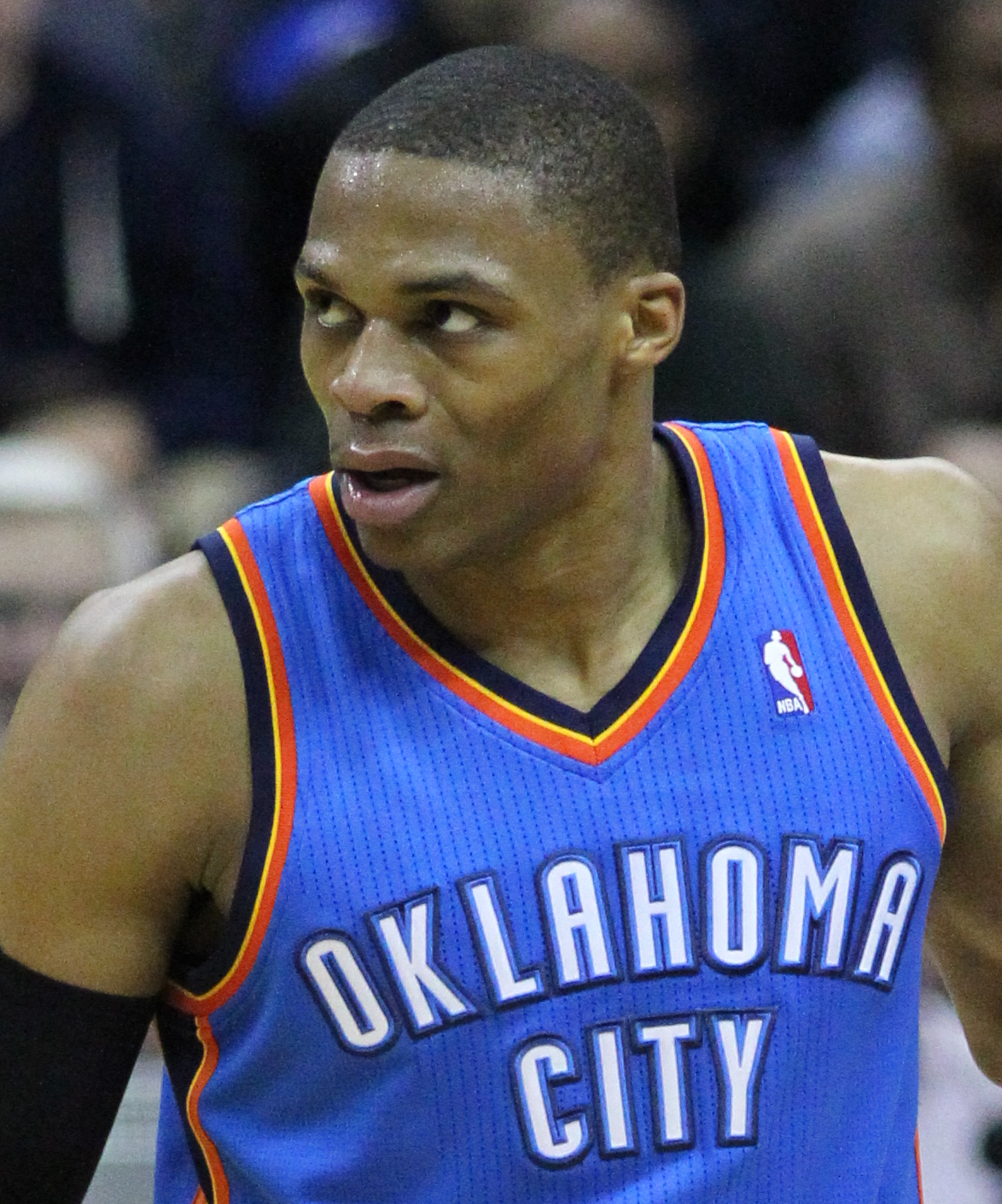
Russell Westbrook

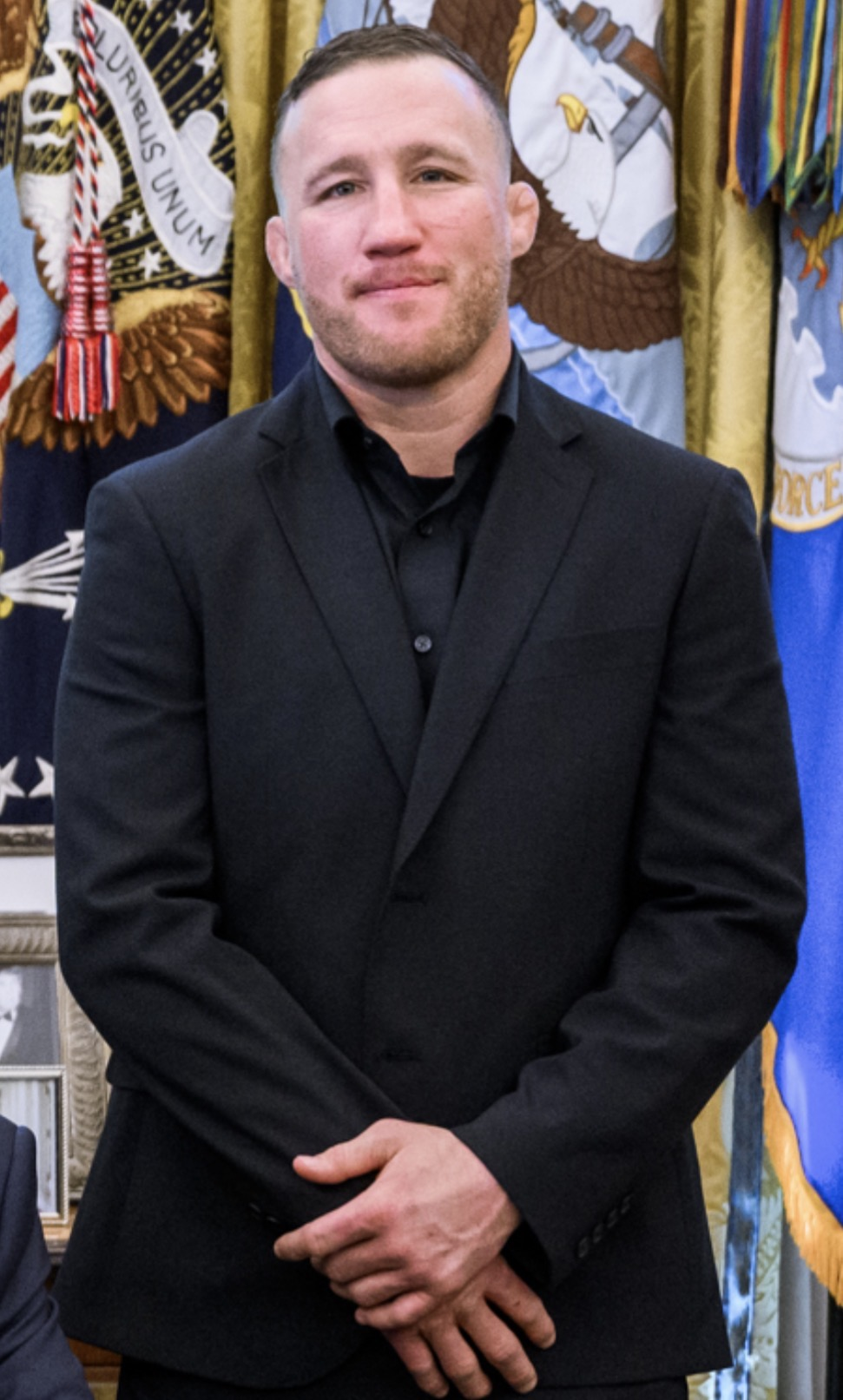
Justin Gaethje

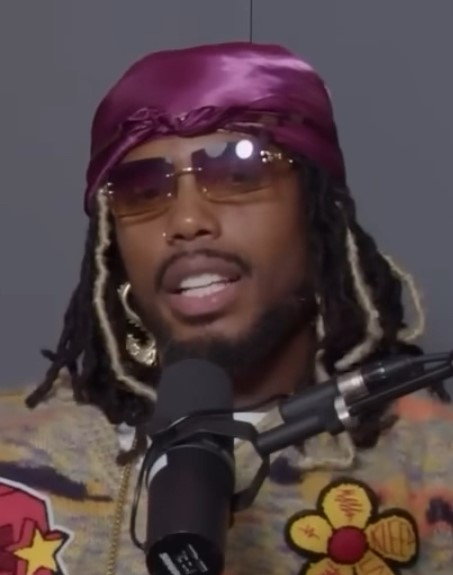
B.o.B.

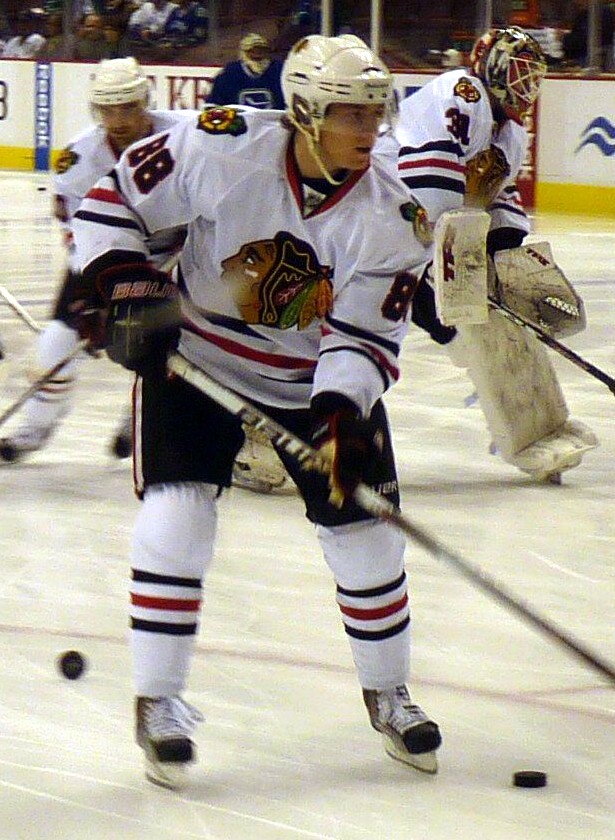
Patrick Kane

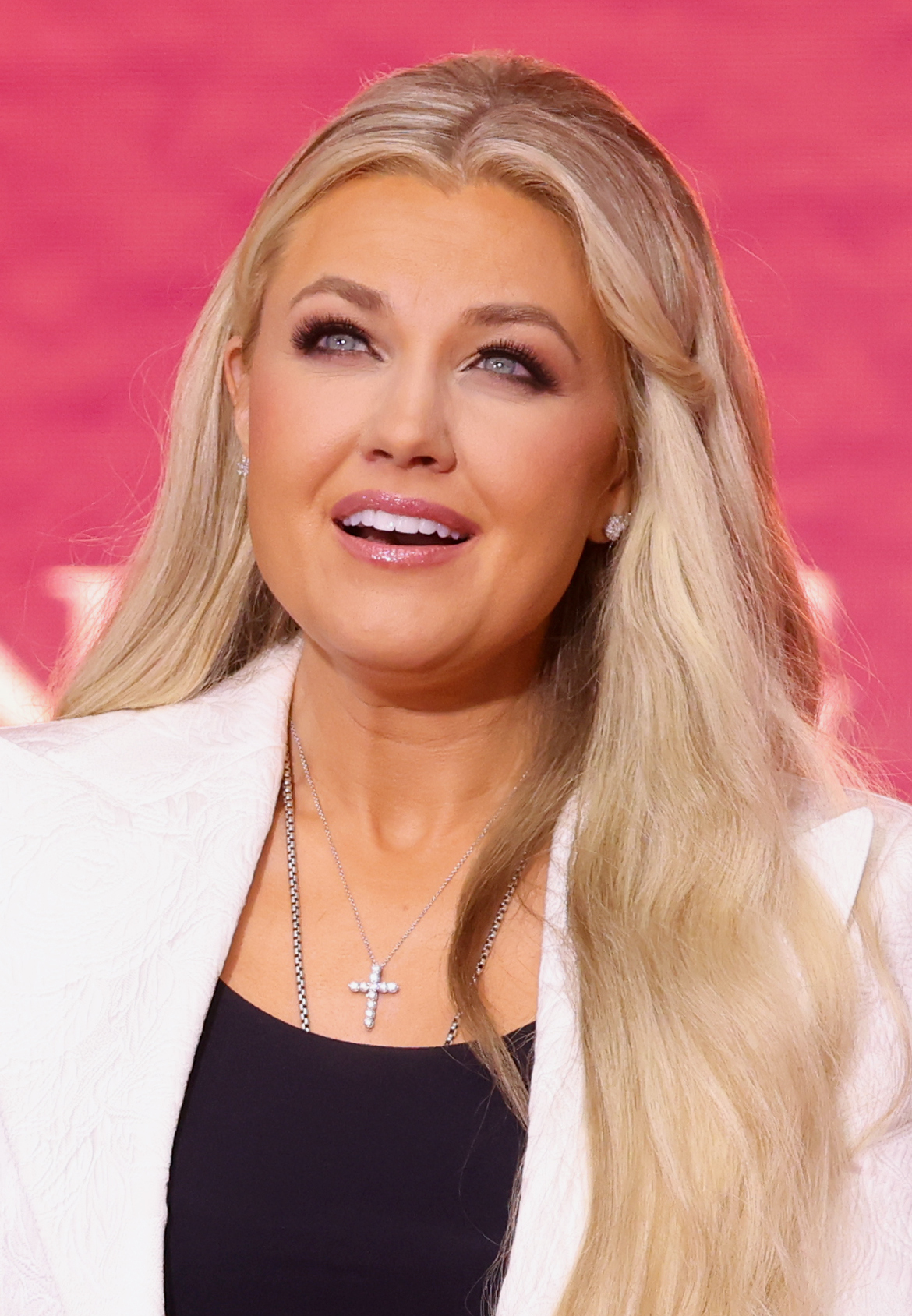
Erika Kirk

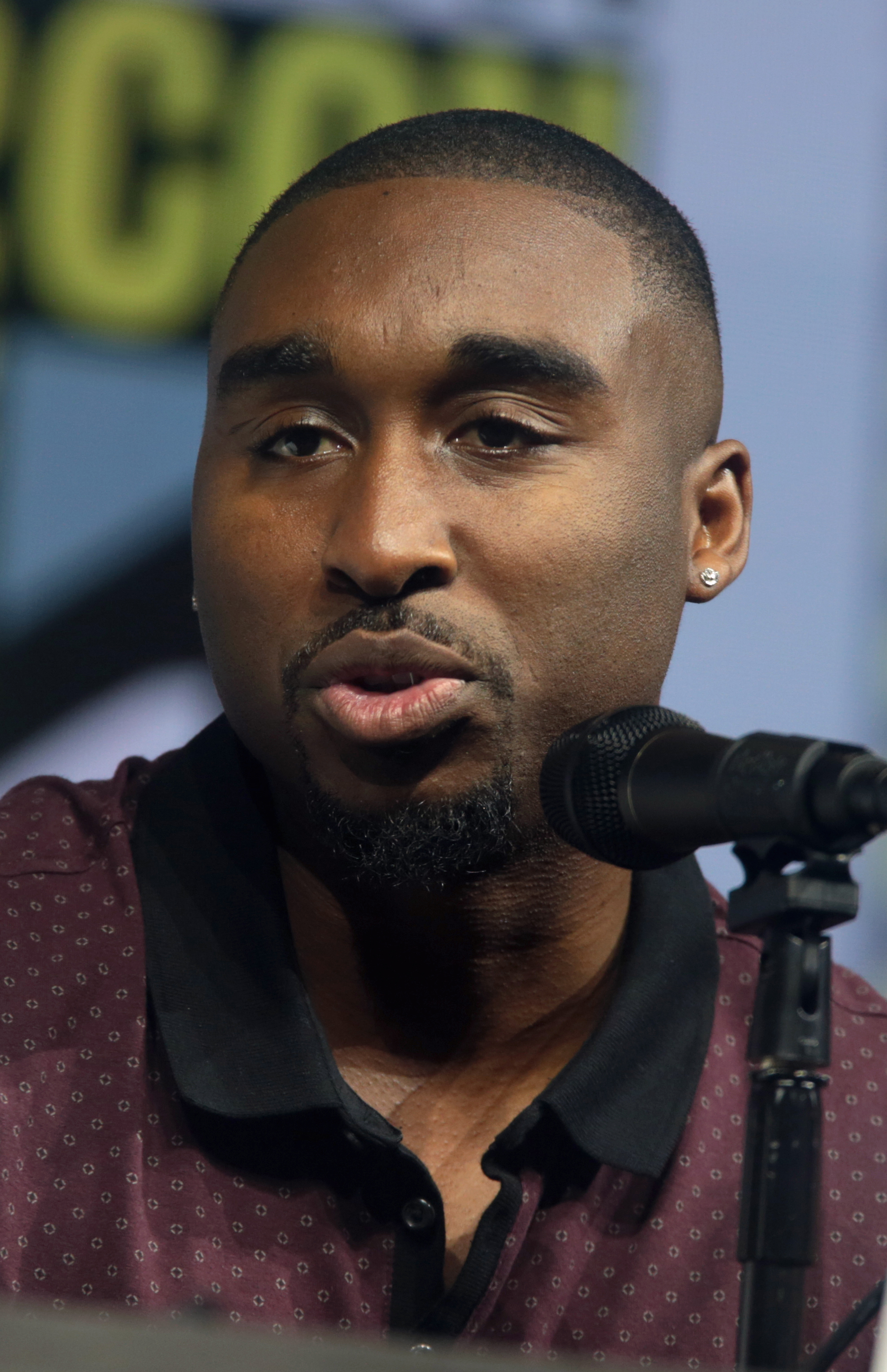
Demetrius Shipp Jr.

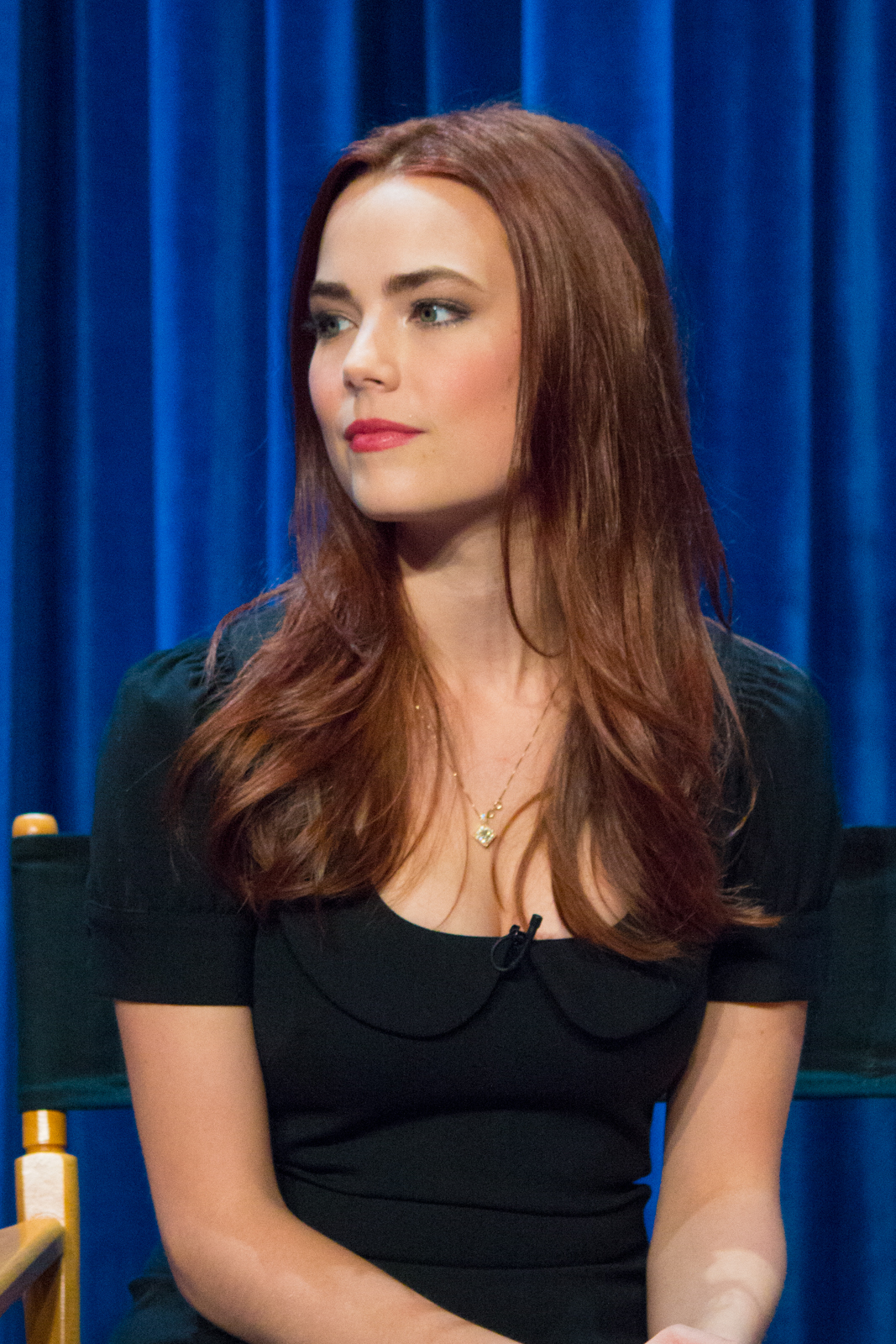
Rebecca Rittenhouse

- November 1 – Robert Alford, football player
- November 2 – Lindze Letherman, actress
- November 3
  - Kendrick Adams, football player
  - Holland Andrews, singer
  - Trevor Einhorn, actor
- November 4
  - Dez Bryant, football player
  - Francesca Hong, politician
- November 5 – Justin Cornwell, actor, writer, and musician
- November 6
  - Mamoudou Athie, Mauritanian-born actor
  - Sean Baker, football player
  - Eric Cray, Philippine-born Olympic sprinter and hurdler
  - Robert Ellis, singer/songwriter and guitarist
  - Emma Stone, actress
- November 7
  - Ayo the Producer, hip hop artist
  - Reid Ewing, actor
  - Kathryn Nesbitt, soccer assistant referee
- November 8
  - Matt Braly, animator, storyboard artist, director, writer, and producer
  - Jared Kusnitz, actor
- November 9
  - Nikki Blonsky, actress and singer
  - Curt Casali, baseball player
  - Analeigh Tipton, actress and fashion model
- November 10
  - Sunny Choi, breakdancer
  - Rennie Curran, football player, speaker, and coach
  - Jonna Mannion, television personality
- November 11 – Alexandra Kyle, actress
- November 12
  - Levy Adcock, football player
  - Robert Arnold, basketball player
  - Joe Banyard, football player
  - Jason Chen, pop singer
  - Russell Westbrook, basketball player
- November 13 – Max Miller, politician
- November 14
  - John Brancy, baritone player
  - Jos Charles, poet, writer, translator, and editor
  - Michael Cox, football player
  - Justin Gaethje, mixed martial artist
- November 15
  - B.o.B., rapper, singer, record producer, and conspiracy theorist
  - Nikolas Besagno, soccer player
  - Lauren Cholewinski, Olympic speed skater
- November 16
  - Gary Boughton, soccer player
  - Clint Bowles, tennis player
  - William Coleman, basketball player
  - Brandon Cumpton, baseball player
- November 17
  - Hilary Barte, tennis player
  - Justin Cooper, actor
- November 18
  - Travis Baltz, football player
  - Elaine Breeden, Olympic swimmer
  - Jeffrey Jordan, basketball player
- November 19
  - Nicole Addimando, convicted murderer
  - Patrick Kane, ice hockey player
- November 20
  - Cody Allen, baseball player
  - Barry Almeida, ice hockey player
  - Erika Kirk, businesswoman, beauty pageant winner, Miss Arizona 2012, and widow of Charlie Kirk
  - Max Pacioretty, ice hockey player
  - Demetrius Shipp Jr., actor
- November 21 – Joseph Anderson, football player
- November 22
  - Sean Beighton, curler
  - Matt Bruenig, lawyer, blogger, policy analyst, and commentator
- November 25
  - Jonathon Amaya, football player
  - John Corona, ice dancer
- November 26 – Blake Harnage, songwriter, music producer, multi-instrumentalist, composer, vocalist, and guitarist for VersaEmerge
- November 28 – Scarlett Pomers, actress
- November 29
  - Dana Brooke, wrestler
  - Russell Wilson, football player
- November 30
  - Terry Broadhurst, ice hockey player
  - James Brown, football player
  - Rebecca Rittenhouse, actress
  - Rotimi, actor and singer

=== December ===
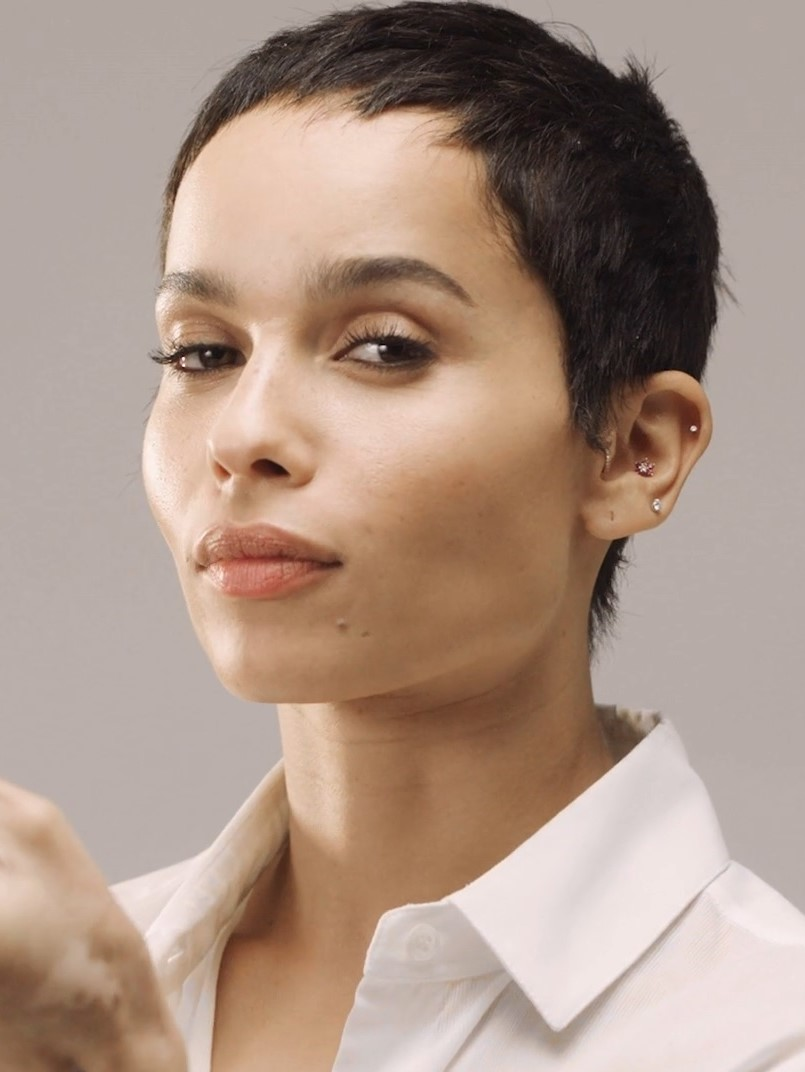
Zoë Kravitz

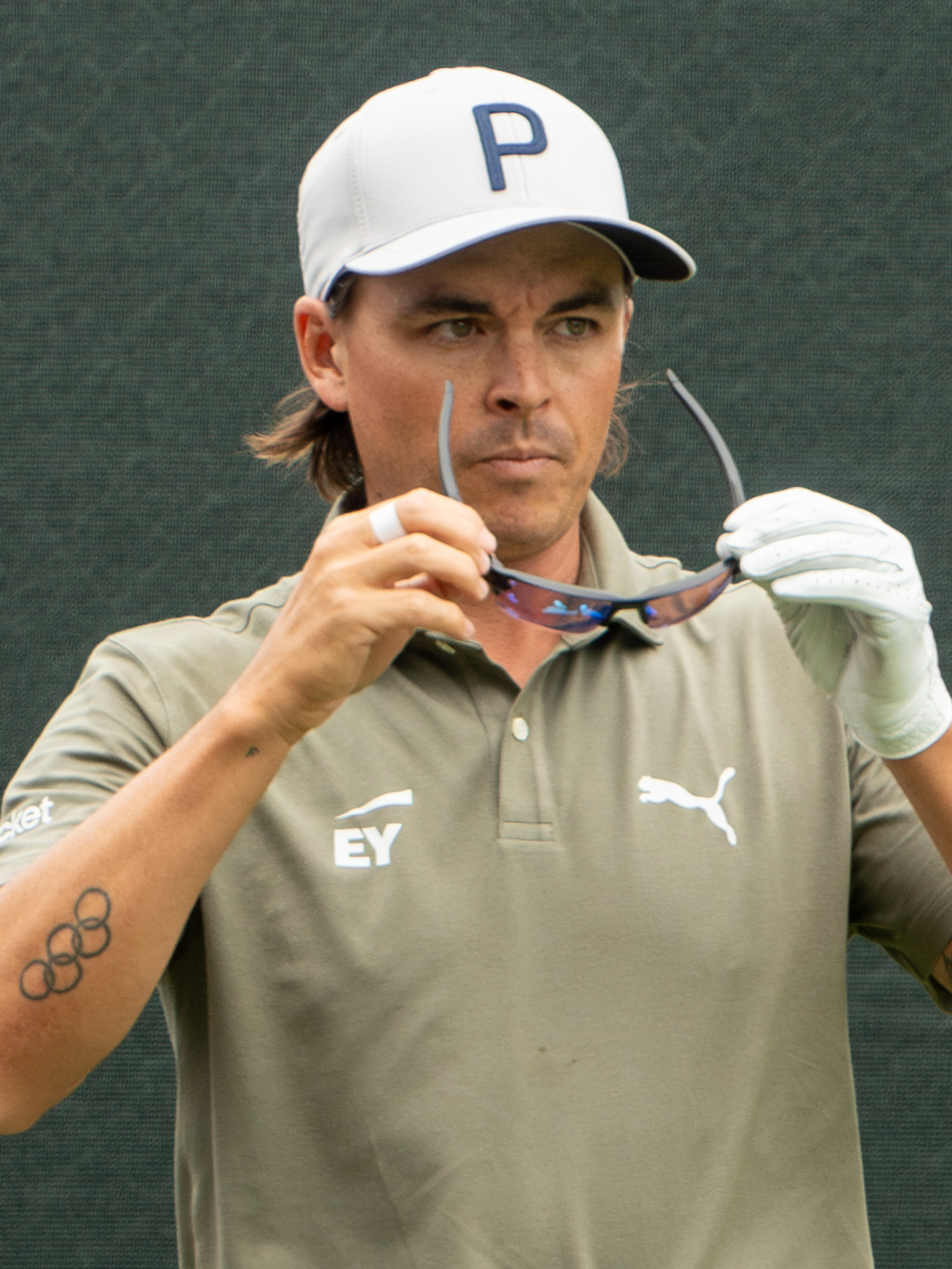
Rickie Fowler

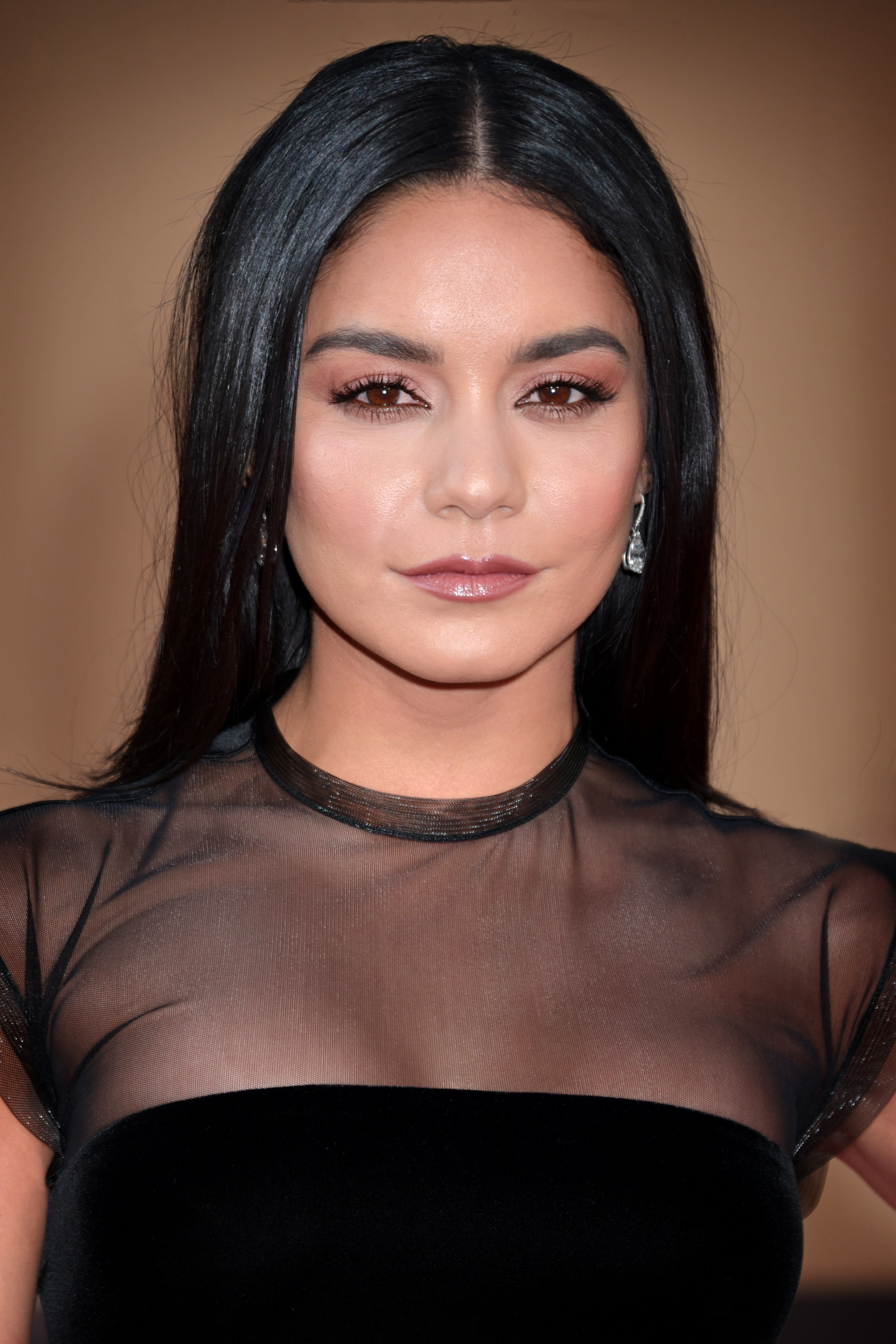
Vanessa Hudgens

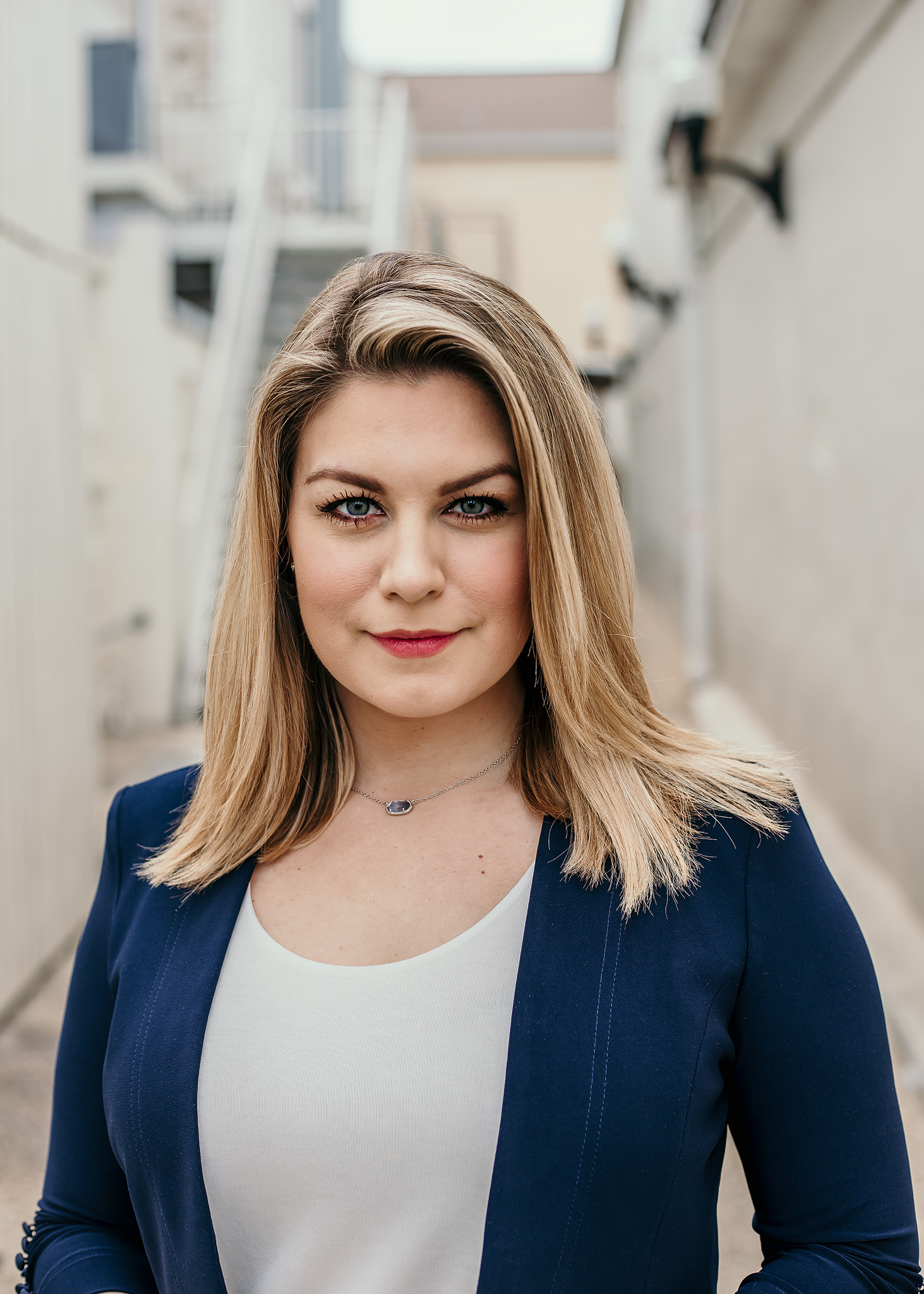
Mallory Hagan

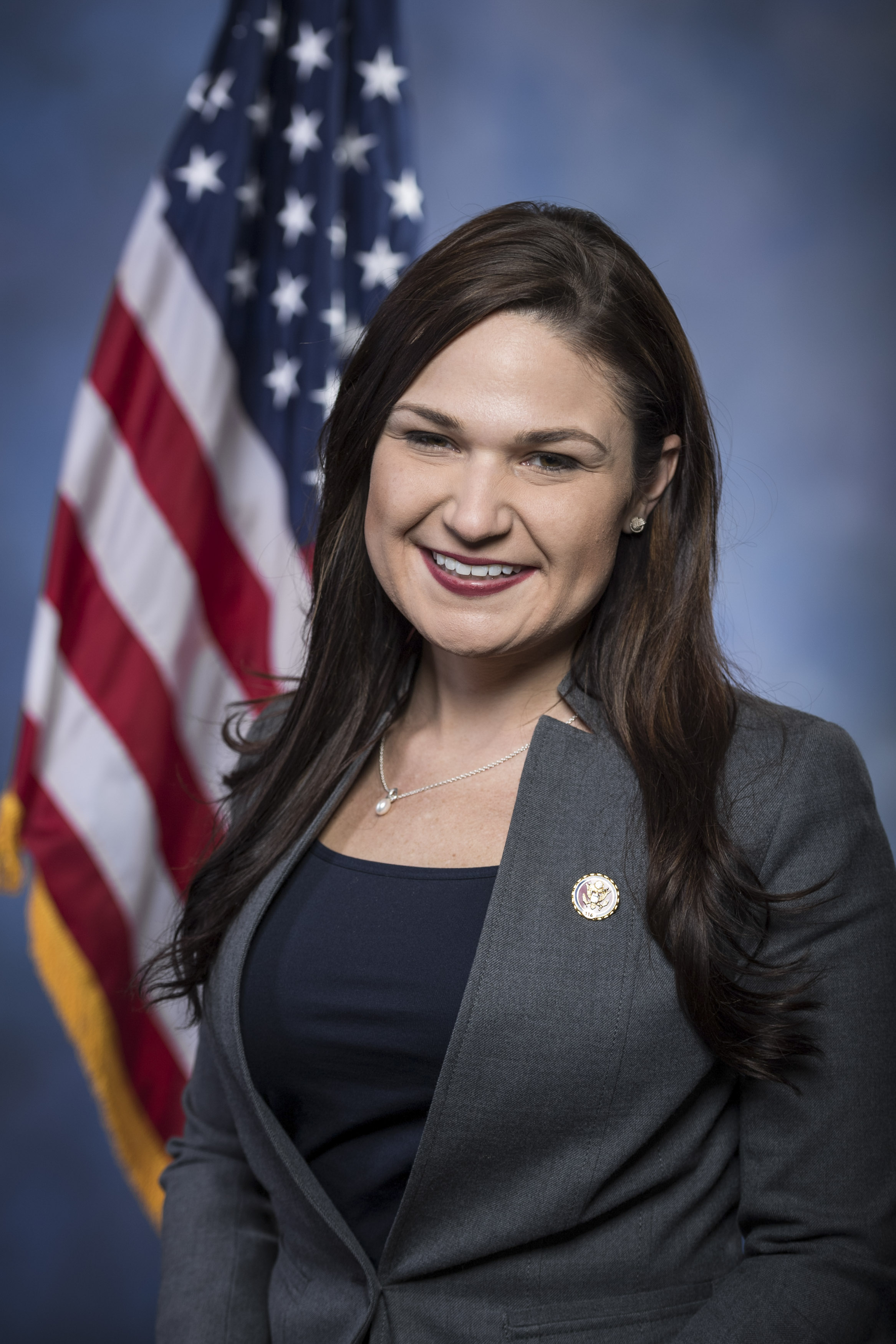
Abby Finkenauer

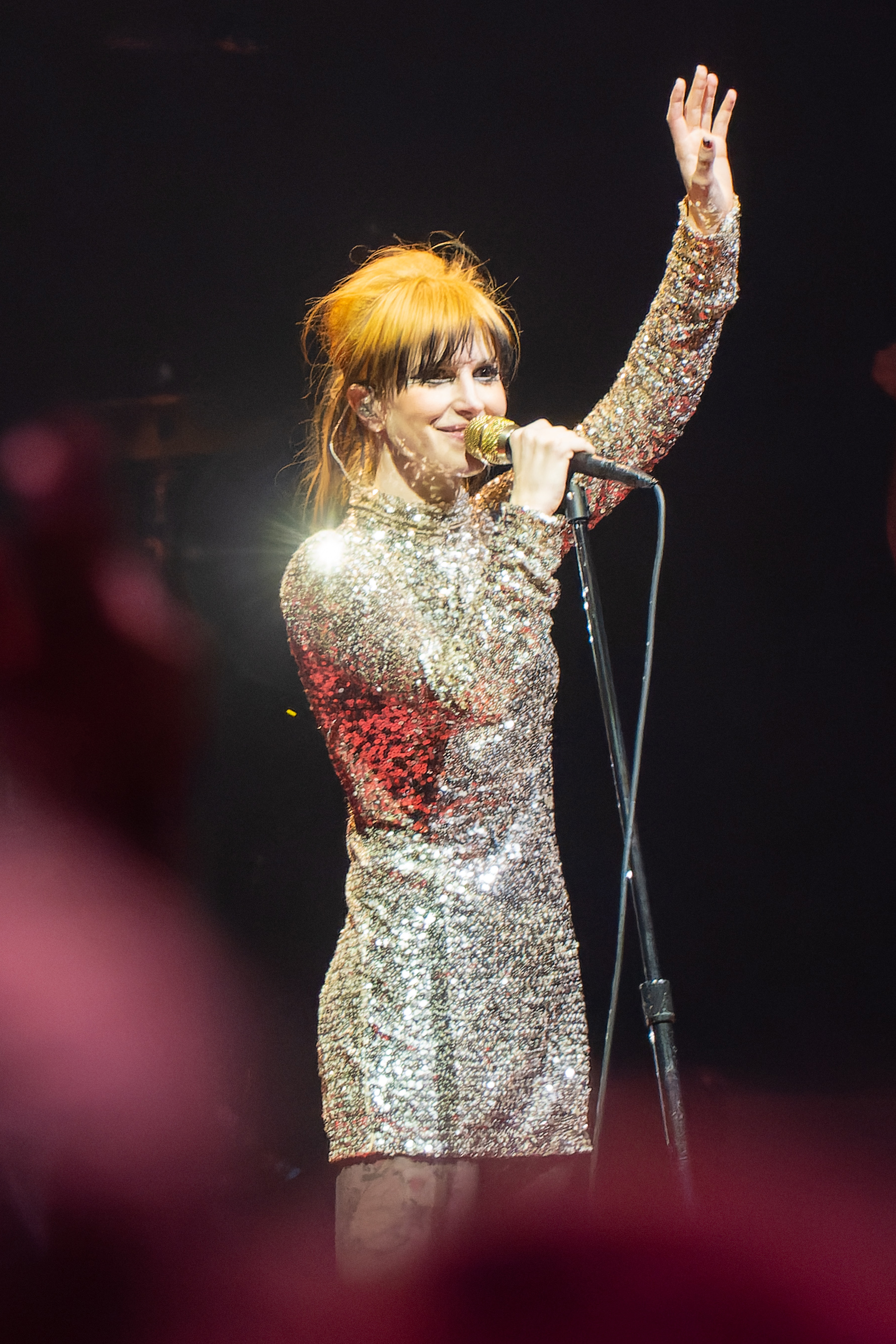
Hayley Williams

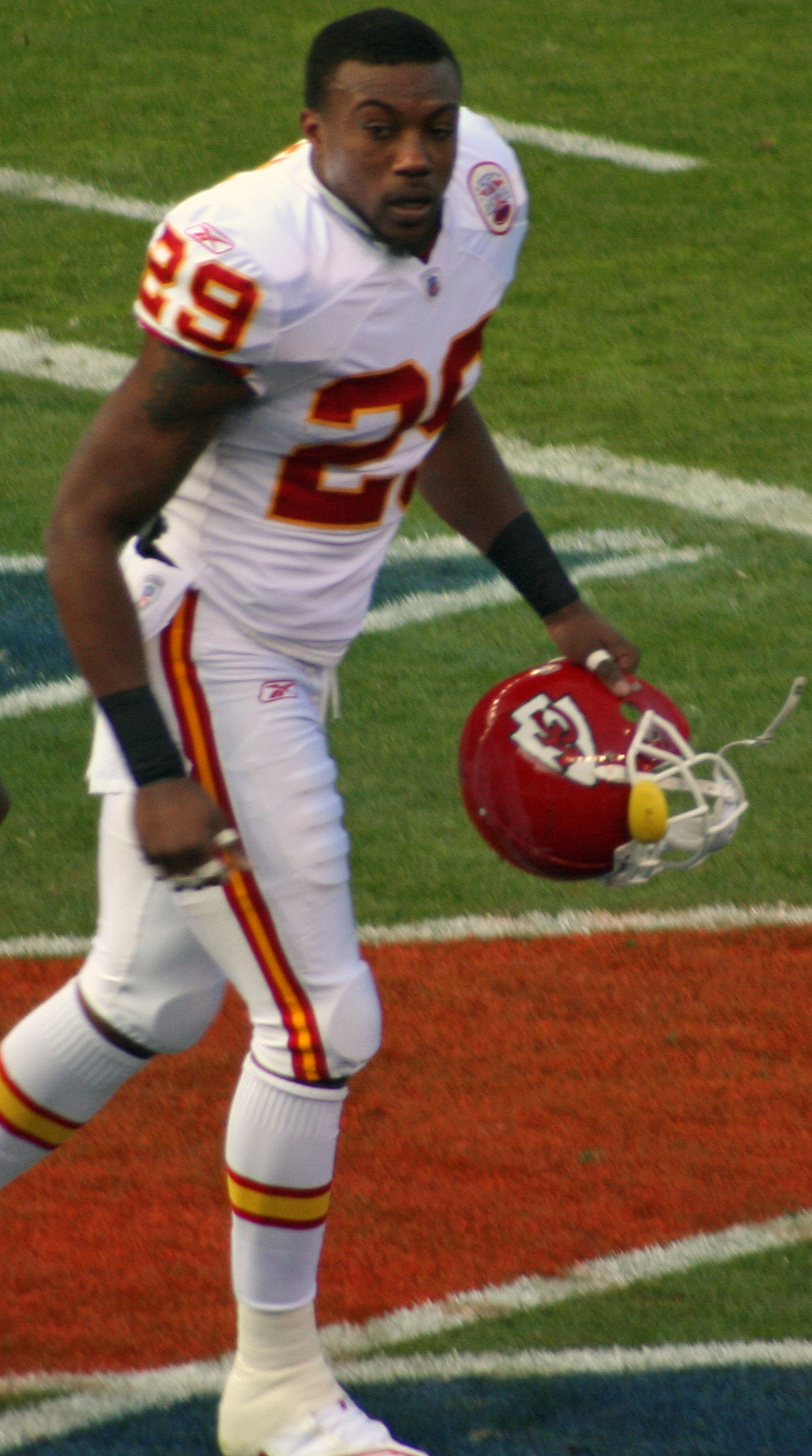
Eric Berry

- December 1
  - Ashley Monique Clark, actress
  - Tyler Joseph, singer
  - Zoë Kravitz, actress, singer, and Model
- December 2 – Rosie Brennan, Olympic cross-country skier
- December 3 – Jeb Brovsky, soccer player
- December 4
  - Rodney Austin, football player
  - Jerry Belmontes, boxer
  - Hilary Cruz, actor, model, and beauty queen, Miss Teen USA 2007
- December 5
  - Ross Bagley, actor
  - Tina Charles, basketball player
- December 7 – Nathan Adrian, Olympic swimmer
- December 11
  - Erik Burgdoerfer, ice hockey player
  - Christina Hagan, politician
- December 12
  - Ahmad Black, football player
  - Steven Bonnell II, streamer better known as Destiny
  - Diondre Borel, football player
- December 13 – Rickie Fowler, golfer
- December 14
  - Alexandra Agre, curler
  - David Borrero, politician
  - Amber Brown, mixed martial artist
  - Nate Ebner, football player
  - Vanessa Hudgens, Actress and singer
  - Rainelle Krause, opera soprano (d. 2026)
- December 15
  - Kimora Blac, drag queen and television personality
  - Marc Rebillet, electronic musician and YouTuber
- December 16
  - Christopher Caluag, American-born Philippine BMX racer
  - Circuit des Yeux, singer/songwriter
  - Nicco Montaño, mixed martial artist
  - Mira Murati, Albanian-born engineer, chief technology officer for OpenAI
- December 18 – Erica Rivera, actress, singer, rapper, dancer, and artist
- December 20
  - Omar Bolden, football player
  - Nick Charlton, football coach
- December 21
  - Kevin Anderson, basketball player
  - Mark Blane, actor, writer, and director
  - Markeith Cummings, basketball player
  - Danny Duffy, baseball player
  - Teresa Ruiz, Mexican-born actress
- December 22 – Brooke Eby, social media influencer (d. 2026)
- December 23
  - Everitte Barbee, calligrapher
  - Mallory Hagan, beauty pageant titleholder, Miss America 2013
- December 24
  - Michelle Boulos, figure skater
  - Kodi Burns, football player
  - Trey Caldwell, politician
- December 25
  - Heather Cooke, American-born Filipino soccer player
  - Eric Gordon, basketball player
- December 27
  - Abby Finkenauer, politician
  - Hayley Williams, singer/songwriter, lead singer of Paramore
- December 28
  - Katlyn Chookagian, mixed martial artist
  - Leslie Cichocki, Paralympic swimmer
- December 29 – Eric Berry, football player
- December 30
  - Bryce Brentz, baseball player
  - Danny Burawa, baseball player
  - Henry Hynoski, American football player
  - Jena Sims, actress
- December 31 – Matthew Atkinson, actor and musician

=== Full date unknown ===
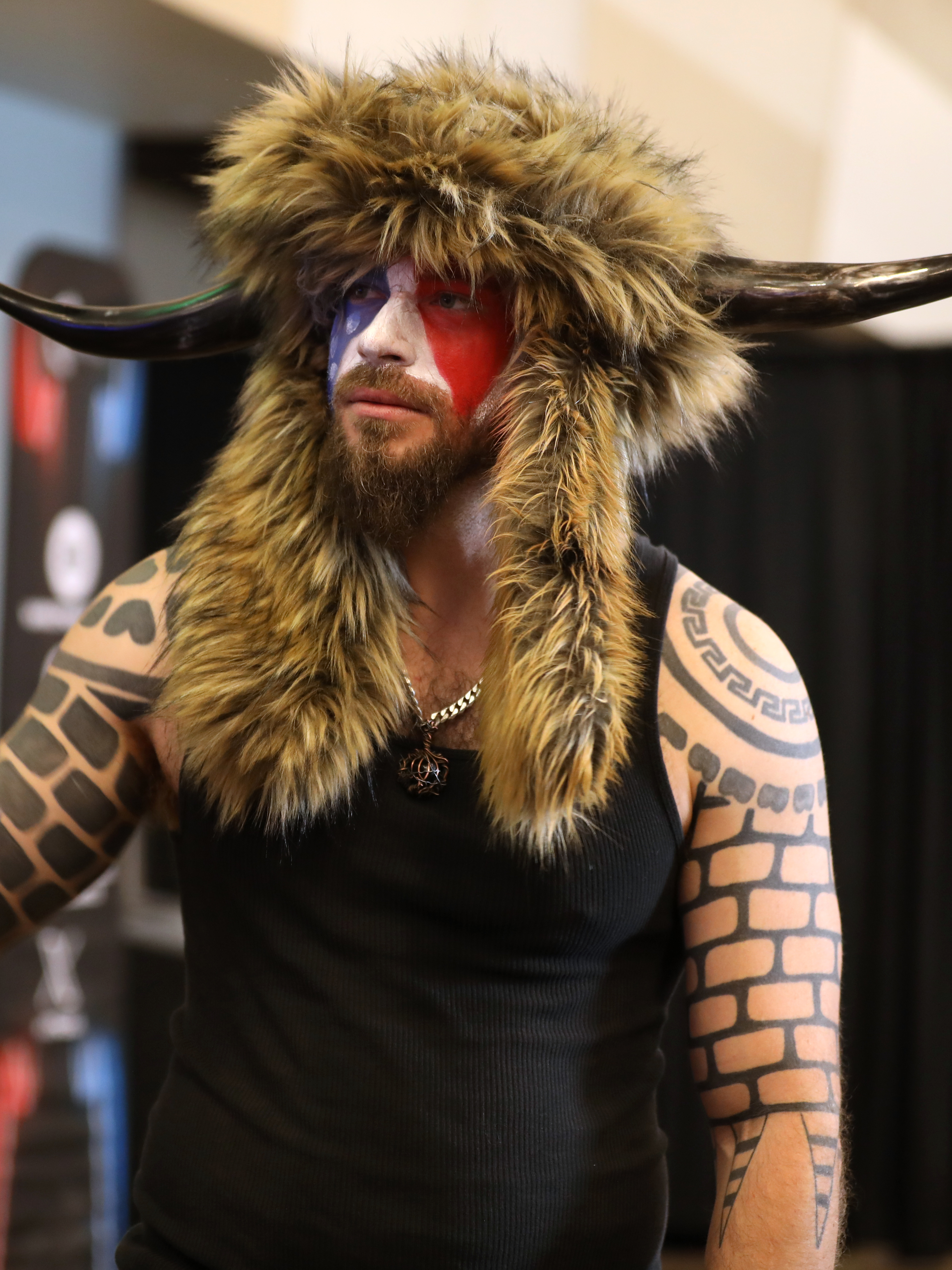
QAnon Shaman

- Niv Acosta, dancer, choreographer, and artist
- Jovan Adepo, British-born American actor
- Kameron Alexander, singer/songwriter and record producer
- Olivia Alexander, singer, dancer, and actress
- Brian Altman, poker player
- Brent Anderson, country singer
- Gretchen Andrew, artist
- Adeem the Artist, country singer
- Angad Aulakh, filmmaker
- Milton Barney Jr., baseball player and coach
- Wayne Barrett, kickboxer
- Jose Batista, politician
- Andrew M. Boss, composer
- Danika Brace, football player and coach
- Serafina Brocious, software engineer
- Imani Jacqueline Brown, researcher and artist
- Nakeya Brown, photographer
- John Burke, pianist
- Corrin Campbell, musician
- Kyle Carey, folk singer
- Reagan Charleston, jewelry designer, lawyer, and television personality
- Thomas Chung, artist
- Lenny Cooper, country rapper
- Jessa Dillow Crisp, survivor of human trafficking and co-founder and executive director of Bridge Hope Now
- Crudo Means Raw, rapper and beatmaker
- Jacob Cutrera, football player
- QAnon Shaman, conspiracy theorist and participant in the January 6 Attack

== Deaths ==
- January 3
  - William Cagney, actor (born 1905)
  - Joie Chitwood, race car driver and stuntman (born 1912)
- January 5 – Pete Maravich, basketball player (born 1947)
- January 7 – Zara Cisco Brough, Nipmuc Chief (born 1919)
- January 11
  - Pappy Boyington, pilot, United States Marine Corps fighter ace (born 1912)
  - Isidor Isaac Rabi, physicist, winner of Nobel Prize in Physics in 1944 for invention of the atomic beam magnetic resonance method of measuring magnetic properties of atoms and molecules (born 1898 in Poland)
- January 12 – Hiram Bingham IV, American diplomat (born 1903)
- January 22 – Parker Fennelly, comedian and actor (born 1891)
- January 25 – Colleen Moore, actress (born 1899)
- February 1 – Heather O'Rourke, actress (born 1975)
- February 3 – Robert Duncan, poet (born 1919)
- February 14 – Frederick Loewe, composer (born 1901 in Berlin)
- February 15 – Richard Feynman, theoretical physicist, winner of Nobel Prize in Physics in 1965 for work on quantum electrodynamics (born 1918)
- February 28 – Harvey Kuenn, baseball player and coach (born 1930)
- March 1 – Joe Besser, actor and comedian (born 1907)
- March 3 – Lois Wilson, actress (born 1894)
- March 5 – Margaret Irving, actress (born 1898)
- March 7
  - Edmund Berkeley, computer scientist (born 1909)
  - Divine, drag singer and character actor (born 1945)
  - Robert Livingston, screen actor (born 1904)
- March 8 – Deane Janis, singer (born 1904)
- March 10 – Glenn Cunningham, Olympic athlete (born 1909)
- March 12 – Karen Steele, actress (born 1931)
- March 13
  - Olive Carey, actress (born 1896)
  - John Holmes, pornographic actor (born 1944)
- March 16 – Dorothy Adams, American character actress (born 1900)
- March 18
  - Joan Field, violinist (born 1915)
  - Frank Wayne, game show producer and host (born 1917)
- March 20 – Gil Evans, American jazz pianist (born 1912)
- March 21 – Edd Roush, baseball player (Cincinnati Reds) and member of the MLB Hall of Fame (born 1893)
- March 22 – Lester Rawlins, stage and screen director (born 1924)
- March 25 – Robert Joffrey, dancer and choreographer (born 1930)
- April 1 – Jim Jordan, actor (born 1896)
- April 3 – Milton Caniff, cartoonist (born 1907)
- April 9
  - Brook Benton, singer-songwriter (born 1931)
  - Dave Prater, rhythm and blues singer (born 1937)
- April 11 – Jesse L. Lasky Jr., screenwriter (born 1910)
- April 17 – Eva Novak, actress (born 1898)
- April 22 – Irene Rich, actress (born 1891)
- April 25
  - Carolyn Franklin, singer (born 1944)
  - Valerie Solanas, radical feminist, attempted murderer of Andy Warhol (born 1936)
- April 26
  - James McCracken, tenor (born 1926)
  - Frederick D. Patterson, academic administrator (born 1901)
- May 8
  - Robert A. Heinlein science fiction author (born 1907)
  - Ruby M. Rouss, WAC and first female president of the Virgin Islands Legislature (born 1921)
- May 13 – Chet Baker, jazz trumpeter (born 1929)
- May 15 – Andrew Duggan, actor (born 1923)
- May 16 – Kay Baxter, bodybuilder (born 1945)
- May 18 – Daws Butler, voice actor (born 1916)
- May 20 – Laurie Dann, murderer (born 1957)
- May 21 – Sammy Davis Sr., American dancer (b. 1900)
- May 27 – Florida Friebus, actor (born 1909)
- May 30 – Ella Raines, screen actress (born 1920)
- June 8 – Eli Mintz, actor (born 1904)
- June 10 – Louis L'Amour, western novelist (born 1908)
- June 11 – Nathan Cook, actor (born 1950)
- June 16 – Kim Milford, actor and singer (born 1951)
- June 18
  - Wilford Leach, theater director (born 1929)
  - E. Hoffmann Price, writer (born 1898)
- June 22
  - Dennis Day, singer and radio and television personality (born 1916)
  - Stuart Randall, actor (born 1909)
- June 23 – Henry Murray, psychologist (born 1893)
- June 25 – Hillel Slovak, Israeli-American guitarist (Red Hot Chili Peppers) (born 1962)
- July 1 – Alice Nunn, actress (born 1927)
- July 3 – Gabriel Dell, actor (born 1919)
- July 4 – Adrian Adonis, professional wrestler (born 1953)
- July 8 – Ray Barbuti, athlete (born 1905)
- July 12
  - Al Bedner, American football player (born 1898)
  - Joshua Logan, stage and film writer (born 1908)
- July 13 – Phil Monroe, animator and director (born 1916)
- July 17 – Bruiser Brody, professional wrestler (born 1946)
- July 21 – Jack Clark, television personality and game show host (born 1921)
- July 22 – Duane Jones, actor (born 1937)
- July 25 – Judith Barsi, actress and murder victim (born 1978)
- July 27 – Frank Zamboni, inventor (born 1901)
- July 31 – Trinidad Silva, actor (born 1950)
- August 1 – Florence Eldridge, actress (born 1901)
- August 5
  - Ralph Meeker, actor (born 1920)
  - Colin Higgins, filmmaker (born 1941)
- August 8
  - Alan Ameche, footballer (born 1933)
  - Alan Napier, actor (born 1903 in the United Kingdom)
- August 10 – Adela Rogers St. Johns, journalist and screenwriter (born 1893)
- August 11 – Anne Ramsey, actress (born 1929)
- August 12 – Jean-Michel Basquiat, artist (born 1960)
- August 14 – Roy Buchanan, guitarist and blues musician (born 1939)
- August 17 – Franklin Delano Roosevelt Jr., American lawyer and politician (born 1914)
- August 21 – Ray Eames, architect and designer, partner of Charles Eames (born 1912)
- August 24 – Leonard Frey, actor (born 1938)
- August 25 – Art Rooney, American football executive and owner (born 1901)
- August 27 – Kerry Lloyd, American role-playing game designer (born 1941)
- August 28
  - Hazel Dawn, actress (born 1890)
  - Max Shulman, novelist, short-story writer and dramatist (born 1919)
- September 1
  - Luis Walter Alvarez, experimental physicist, winner of Nobel Prize in Physics in 1968 for bubble chamber research into particle physics (born 1911)
  - Hugh Hunt, set designer (born 1902)
- September 6 – Harold Rosson, cinematographer (born 1895)
- September 7 – Thelma Payne, Olympic diver (born 1896)
- September 11 – John Sylvester White, actor (born 1919)
- September 21
  - Glenn Robert Davis, politician (born 1914)
  - Henry Koster, German-born film director (born 1905)
- September 25 – Billy Carter, farmer, businessman, brewer, and politician (born 1937)
- September 28 – Ethel Grandin, actress (born 1894)
- September 29 – Charles Addams, cartoonist (born 1912)
- September 30 – Joachim Prinz, German-born American rabbi (born 1902)
- October 7 – Billy Daniels, singer (born 1915)
- October 10 – Kurt Marshall, model and actor (born 1965)
- October 11
  - Morgan Farley, actor (born 1898)
  - Wayland Flowers, puppeteer (born 1939)
- October 12 – Ken Murray, actor (born 1903)
- October 15 – John Ball, novelist (born 1911)
- October 31 – John Houseman, screen actor-producer (born 1902 in Romania)
- November 1
  - Broda Otto Barnes, medical researcher (born 1906)
  - George Folsey, cinematographer (born 1898)
- November 9 – John N. Mitchell, lawyer, 67th United States Attorney General (born 1913)
- November 12 – Lyman Lemnitzer, Army General (born 1899)
- November 25 – Alphaeus Philemon Cole, portrait artist, engraver and supercentenarian (born 1876)
- November 27
  - Angela Aames, American actress (born 1956)
  - John Carradine, actor (born 1906)
- November 29 – Donald Keyhoe, American ufologist (born 1897)
- December 6
  - Timothy Patrick Murphy, actor (born 1959)
  - Roy Orbison, singer-songwriter and guitarist (born 1936)
- December 7
  - Christopher Connelly, actor (born 1941)
  - Dorothy Jordan, actress (born 1906)
- December 10 – Richard S. Castellano, actor (b. 1933)
- December 16 – Sylvester, singer-songwriter (born 1947)
- December 14 – Stuart Symington, politician (born 1901)
- December 17 – Jerry Hopper, film and television director (born 1907)
- December 20 – Max Robinson, broadcast journalist, and ABC News World News Tonight co-anchor (born 1939)
- December 21
  - Willie Kamm, baseball player (born 1900)
  - Bob Steele, actor (born 1907)
- December 26 – Glenn McCarthy, oil tycoon and businessman (born 1907)
- December 27
  - Hal Ashby, film director (born 1929)
  - Jess Oppenheimer, radio and television producer (born 1913)
- December 30 – Isamu Noguchi, artist and landscape architect (born 1904)

=== Undated ===
- Thomas Greenwood, Illinois labor and Indian affairs activist (b. 1908)
- Helen Redfield, geneticist (b. 1900)

== See also ==
- 1988 North American drought
- 1988 in American television
- List of American films of 1988
- Timeline of United States history (1970–1989)
