= 1991 in the United States =

- Decades: 1970s; 1980s; 1990s; 2000s; 2010s
- See also: History of the United States (1991–2016); Timeline of United States history (1990–2009); List of years in the United States

Events from the year 1991 in the United States.

== Incumbents ==
=== Federal government ===
- President: George H. W. Bush (R-Texas)
- Vice President: Dan Quayle (R-Indiana)
- Chief Justice: William Rehnquist (Virginia)
- Speaker of the House of Representatives: Tom Foley (D-Washington)
- Senate Majority Leader: George J. Mitchell (D-Maine)
- Congress: 101st (until January 3), 102nd (starting January 3)

==== State governments ====
Governors and lieutenant governors

=== Governors ===
- Governor of Alabama: H. Guy Hunt (Republican)
- Governor of Alaska: Wally Hickel (Alaskan Independence)/(Republican)
- Governor of Arizona: Rose Mofford (Democratic) (until March 6), Fife Symington III (Republican) (starting March 6)
- Governor of Arkansas: Bill Clinton (Democratic)
- Governor of California: George Deukmejian (Republican) (until January 7), Pete Wilson (Republican) (starting January 7)
- Governor of Colorado: Roy Romer (Democratic)
- Governor of Connecticut: William A O'Neill (Democratic) (until January 9), Lowell P. Weicker Jr. (A Connecticut) (starting January 9)
- Governor of Delaware: Michael Castle (Republican)
- Governor of Florida: Bob Martinez (Republican) (until January 8), Lawton Chiles (Democratic) (starting January 8)
- Governor of Georgia: Joe Frank Harris (Democratic) (until January 14), Zell Miller (Democratic) (starting January 14)
- Governor of Hawaii: John D. Waihee III (Democratic)
- Governor of Idaho: Cecil D. Andrus (Democratic)
- Governor of Illinois: James R. Thompson (Republican) (until January 14), Jim Edgar (Republican) (starting January 14)
- Governor of Indiana: Evan Bayh (Democratic)
- Governor of Iowa: Terry E. Branstad (Republican)
- Governor of Kansas: Mike Hayden (Republican) (until January 14), Joan Finney (Democratic) (starting January 14)
- Governor of Kentucky: Wallace G. Wilkinson (Democratic) (until December 10), Brereton Jones (Democratic) (starting December 10)
- Governor of Louisiana: Buddy Roemer (Democratic)/(Republican)
- Governor of Maine: John R. McKernan Jr. (Republican)
- Governor of Maryland: William Donald Schaefer (Democratic)
- Governor of Massachusetts: Michael Dukakis (Democratic) (until January 3), William F. Weld (Republican) (starting January 3)
- Governor of Michigan: James Blanchard (Democratic) (until January 1), John Engler (Republican) (starting January 1)
- Governor of Minnesota: Rudy Perpich (Democratic) (until January 7), Arne H. Carlson (Republican) (starting January 7)
- Governor of Mississippi: Ray Mabus (Democratic)
- Governor of Missouri: John Ashcroft (Republican)
- Governor of Montana: Stan Stephens (Republican)
- Governor of Nebraska: Kay A. Orr (Republican) (until January 9), Ben Nelson (Democratic) (starting January 9)
- Governor of Nevada: Bob Miller (Democratic)
- Governor of New Hampshire: Judd Gregg (Republican)
- Governor of New Jersey: James Florio (Democratic)
- Governor of New Mexico: Garrey Carruthers (Republican) (until January 1), Bruce King (Democratic) (starting January 1)
- Governor of New York: Mario Cuomo (Democratic)
- Governor of North Carolina: James G. Martin (Republican)
- Governor of North Dakota: George A. Sinner (Democratic)
- Governor of Ohio: Dick Celeste (Democratic) (until January 14), George Voinovich (Republican) (starting January 14)
- Governor of Oklahoma: Henry Bellmon (Republican) (until January 14), David Walters (Democratic) (starting January 14)
- Governor of Oregon: Neil Goldschmidt (Democratic) (until January 14), Barbara Roberts (Democratic) (starting January 14)
- Governor of Pennsylvania: Robert P. Casey (Democratic)
- Governor of Rhode Island: Edward D. DiPrete (Republican) (until January 1), Bruce Sundlun (Democratic) (starting January 1)
- Governor of South Carolina: Carroll A. Campbell Jr. (Republican)
- Governor of South Dakota: George S. Mickelson (Republican)
- Governor of Tennessee: Ned McWherter (Democratic)
- Governor of Texas: Bill Clements (Republican) (until January 15), Ann Richards (Democratic) (starting January 15)
- Governor of Utah: Norman H. Bangerter (Republican)
- Governor of Vermont:
  - until January 10: Madeleine M. Kunin (Democratic)
  - January 10-August 13: Richard A. Snelling (Republican)
  - starting August 13: Howard Dean (Democratic)
- Governor of Virginia: Douglas Wilder (Democratic)
- Governor of Washington: Booth Gardner (Democratic)
- Governor of West Virginia: Gaston Caperton (Democratic)
- Governor of Wisconsin: Tommy Thompson (Republican)
- Governor of Wyoming: Mike Sullivan (Democratic)

=== Lieutenant governors ===
- Lieutenant Governor of Alabama: Jim Folsom Jr. (Democratic)
- Lieutenant Governor of Alaska: Jack Coghill (Alaskan Independence)
- Lieutenant Governor of Arkansas: Winston Bryant (Democratic) (until January 15), Jim Guy Tucker (Democratic) (starting January 15)
- Lieutenant Governor of California: Leo T. McCarthy (Democratic)
- Lieutenant Governor of Colorado: Mike Callihan (Democratic)
- Lieutenant Governor of Connecticut: Joseph J. Fauliso (Democratic) (until January 9), Eunice Groark (A Connecticut) (starting January 9)
- Lieutenant Governor of Delaware: Dale E. Wolf (Republican)
- Lieutenant Governor of Florida: Bobby Brantley (Republican) (until January 8), Buddy MacKay (Democratic) (starting January 8)
- Lieutenant Governor of Georgia: Zell Miller (Democratic) (until January 13), Pierre Howard (Democratic) (starting January 13)
- Lieutenant Governor of Hawaii: Ben Cayetano (Democratic)
- Lieutenant Governor of Idaho: Butch Otter (Republican)
- Lieutenant Governor of Illinois: George H. Ryan (Republican) (until January 14), Bob Kustra (Republican) (starting January 14)
- Lieutenant Governor of Indiana: Frank O'Bannon (Democratic)
- Lieutenant Governor of Iowa: Jo Ann Zimmerman (Democratic) (until January), Joy Corning (Republican) (starting January)
- Lieutenant Governor of Kansas: Jack D. Walker (Republican) (until January 14), Jim Francisco (Democratic) (starting January 14)
- Lieutenant Governor of Kentucky: Brereton Jones (Democratic) (until December 10), Paul E. Patton (Democratic) (starting December 10)
- Lieutenant Governor of Louisiana: Paul Hardy (Republican)
- Lieutenant Governor of Maryland: Melvin A. Steinberg (Democratic)
- Lieutenant Governor of Massachusetts: Evelyn Murphy (Democratic) (until January 3), Paul Cellucci (Republican) (starting January 3)
- Lieutenant Governor of Michigan: Martha W. Griffiths (Democratic) (until January 1), Connie Binsfeld (Republican) (starting January 1)
- Lieutenant Governor of Minnesota: Marlene Johnson (Democratic) (until January 7), Joanell Dyrstad (Democratic) (starting January 7)
- Lieutenant Governor of Mississippi: Brad Dye (Democratic)
- Lieutenant Governor of Missouri: Mel Carnahan (Democratic)
- Lieutenant Governor of Montana: Allen Kolstad (Republican) (until January 20), Denny Rehberg (Republican) (starting January 20)
- Lieutenant Governor of Nebraska: William E. Nichol (Republican) (until month and day unknown), Maxine Moul (Democratic) (starting month and day unknown)
- Lieutenant Governor of Nevada: vacant (until January 7), Sue Wagner (Republican) (starting January 7)
- Lieutenant Governor of New Mexico: Jack L. Stahl (Republican) (until January 1), Casey Luna (Democratic) (starting January 1)
- Lieutenant Governor of New York: Stan Lundine (Democratic)
- Lieutenant Governor of North Carolina: James Carson Gardner (Republican)
- Lieutenant Governor of North Dakota: Lloyd Omdahl (Democratic)
- Lieutenant Governor of Ohio: Paul R. Leonard (Democratic) (until January 14), Mike DeWine (Democratic) (starting January 14)
- Lieutenant Governor of Oklahoma: Robert S. Kerr III (Democratic) (until month and day unknown), Jack Mildren (Democratic) (starting month and day unknown)
- Lieutenant Governor of Pennsylvania: Mark Singel (Democratic)
- Lieutenant Governor of Rhode Island: Roger N. Begin (Democratic)
- Lieutenant Governor of South Carolina: Nick Theodore (Democratic)
- Lieutenant Governor of South Dakota: Walter Dale Miller (Republican)
- Lieutenant Governor of Tennessee: John S. Wilder (Democratic)
- Lieutenant Governor of Texas: William P. Hobby Jr. (Democratic) (until January 15), Bob Bullock (Democratic) (starting January 15)
- Lieutenant Governor of Utah: W. Val Oveson (Republican)
- Lieutenant Governor of Vermont: Howard Dean (Democratic) (until August 13), vacant (starting August 13)
- Lieutenant Governor of Virginia: Don Beyer (Democratic)
- Lieutenant Governor of Washington: Joel Pritchard (Republican)
- Lieutenant Governor of Wisconsin: Scott McCallum (Republican)

== Events ==
=== January ===
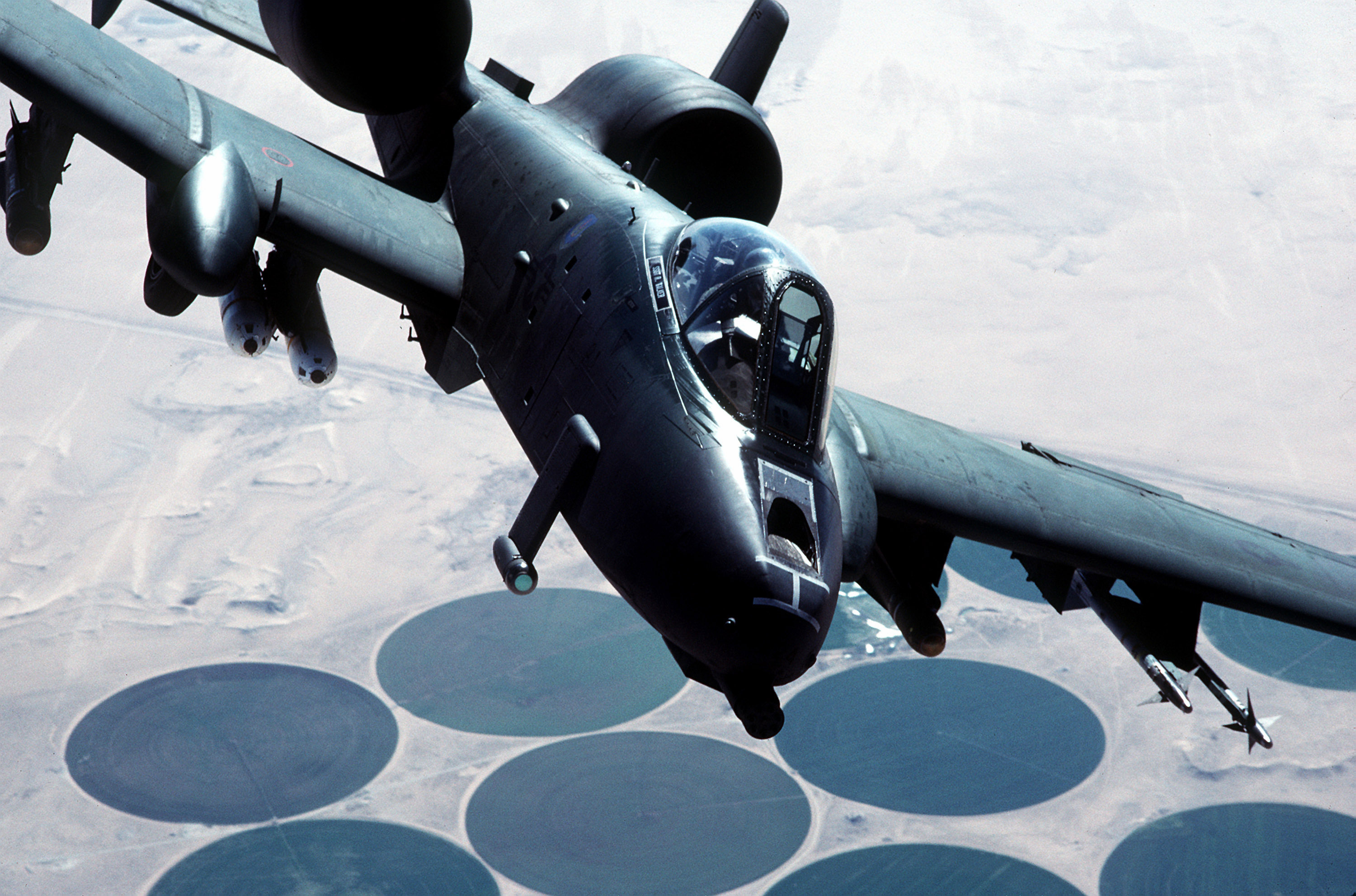
January 17: First air strikes on Iraq in the Gulf War

- January 2 – Sharon Pratt Dixon is sworn in as mayor of the District of Columbia, becoming the first African-American woman to be mayor of a major U.S. city.
- January 3 –– The television sitcom series Blossom premieres on NBC.
- January 7 – United States Secretary of Defense Dick Cheney cancels the $57,000,000,000 order for the McDonnell Douglas A-12 Avenger II.
- January 8 – Pan American World Airways files for bankruptcy protection.
- January 9 – United States Secretary of State James Baker meets with Iraqi foreign minister Tariq Aziz, but fails to produce a plan for Iraq to withdraw its troops from Kuwait.
- January 12 – Gulf War: The Congress of the United States passes a resolution authorizing the use of military force to liberate Kuwait.
- January 16 – U.S. serial killer Aileen Wuornos confesses to the murders of six men.
- January 17 – Gulf War: Operation Desert Storm begins with airstrikes against Iraq.
- January 18 – Eastern Air Lines ceases operations after flying for two years under bankruptcy protection.
- January 25 – President George H. W. Bush names Rep. Edward Rell Madigan as United States Secretary of Agriculture, replacing Clayton Keith Yeutter, who had been elected Chairman of the Republican National Committee.
- January 26 – In Washington, D.C., tens of thousands of people rally against the Persian Gulf War.
- January 27 – Super Bowl XXV in football: The New York Giants defeat the Buffalo Bills 20–19 at Tampa Stadium in Tampa, Florida.
- January 29
  - George H. W. Bush delivers his second State of the Union Address.
  - The first attempt to cure cancer by gene therapy takes place at the National Cancer Institute in Bethesda, Maryland.

=== February ===
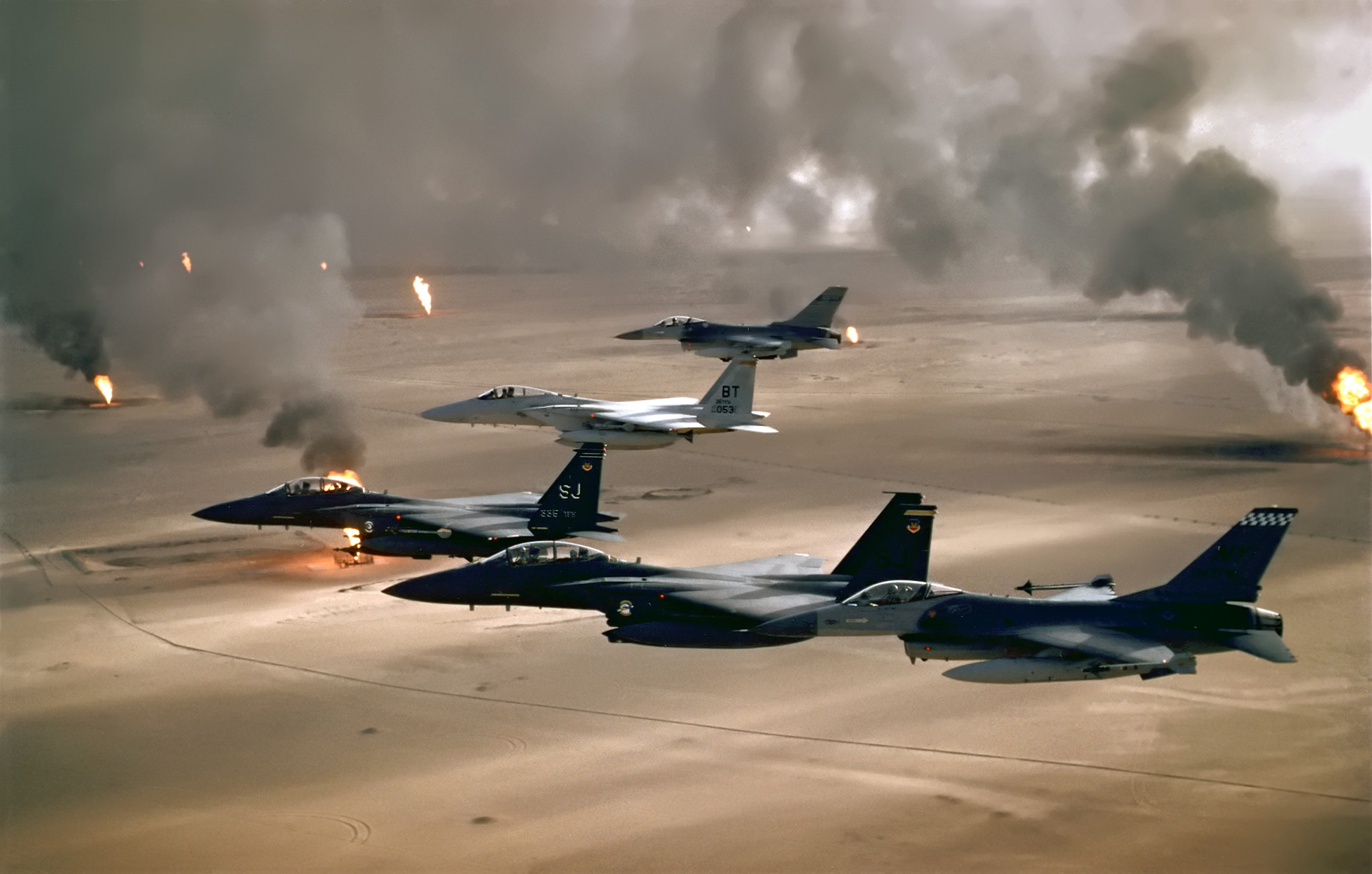
c. February: Gulf War: Retreating Iraqi forces set the Kuwaiti oil fires

- February – The early 1990s recession ends.
- February 1 – A USAir Boeing 737-300, Flight 1493 collides with a SkyWest Airlines Fairchild Metroliner, Flight 5569 at Los Angeles International Airport, killing 34 people.
- February 5 – A Michigan court bars Dr. Jack Kevorkian from assisting in suicides.
- February 7 – Gulf War: Ground troops cross the Saudi Arabian border and enter Kuwait, thus starting the ground phase of the war.
- February 9 – The Adventures of Pete & Pete debuts on Nickelodeon.
- February 13 – Gulf War: Two laser-guided bombs destroy an underground bunker in Baghdad, killing 314 Iraqis including 130 children. United States military intelligence claims the structure was transmitting military signals but Iraqi officials identify it as a bomb shelter.
- February 22 – Gulf War: Iraq accepts a Russian-proposed cease fire agreement. The U.S. rejects the agreement, but says that retreating Iraqi forces will not be attacked if they leave Kuwait within 24 hours.
- February 23 – The One Meridian Plaza fire in Philadelphia, Pennsylvania kills three firefighters and destroys eight floors of the building.
- February 25 – Gulf War: Part of an Iraqi Scud missile hits an American military barracks in Dhahran, Saudi Arabia, killing 29 and injuring 99 U.S. soldiers. It is the single most devastating attack on U.S. forces during the war.
- February 26 – Gulf War: On Baghdad radio, Iraqi President Saddam Hussein announces the withdrawal of Iraqi troops from Kuwait. Iraqi soldiers set fire to Kuwaiti oil fields as they retreat.
- February 27 – Gulf War (1990–1991) ends: U.S. President George H. W. Bush announces that "Kuwait is liberated".
- February 28 – Impostor James Hogue is exposed at Princeton University.

=== March ===
- March 1 – Clayton Keith Yeutter leaves his position as the United States Secretary of Agriculture.
- March 3
  - An amateur video captures the beating of Rodney King by Los Angeles, California police officers.
  - United Airlines Flight 585 crashes in Colorado Springs, Colorado, killing all 25 people on board.
- March 10 – Gulf War: Operation Phase Echo – 540,000 American troops begin to leave the Persian Gulf.
- March 13
  - The United States Department of Justice announces that Exxon has agreed to pay $1,000,000,000 for the clean-up of the Exxon Valdez oil spill in Alaska.
  - The Air Quality Agreement ("Acid Rain Treaty of 1991") is signed between the Federal government and Canada.
- March 15
  - Four Los Angeles, California police officers are indicted for the videotaped March 3 beating of motorist Rodney King during an arrest.
  - Germany formally regains complete independence after the four post-World War II occupying powers (France, the United Kingdom, the United States and the Soviet Union) relinquish all remaining rights.
  - The U.S. and Albania resume diplomatic relations for the first time since 1939.
- March 18 – Get the Picture debuts on Nickelodeon.
- March 24 – The World Wrestling Federation holds WrestleMania VII at the Los Angeles Memorial Sports Arena in Los Angeles, California.
- March 25 – The 63rd Academy Awards, hosted by Billy Crystal, are held at Shrine Auditorium in Los Angeles. Kevin Costner's Dances With Wolves wins seven awards out of 12 nominations, including Best Picture and Best Director. The telecast garners nearly 43 million viewers.
- March 30 – Northern Michigan University wins the NCAA Division I title in hockey, 8–7 in the third overtime against Boston University.

=== April ===
- April 4
  - Merion air disaster: Senator John Heinz of Pennsylvania and six others are killed when a helicopter collides with their plane over Merion, Pennsylvania.
  - William Kennedy Smith, a nephew of U.S. Senator Ted Kennedy, is identified as a suspect in an alleged Palm Beach, Florida sexual assault.
  - 1991 Sacramento hostage crisis: Four gunmen take 41 people hostage at a Good Guys! electronics store in Sacramento, California. Three hostages, as well as three of the four hostage-takers, are killed.
- April 5
  - Former Senator John Tower and 22 others are killed in an airplane crash in Brunswick, Georgia.
  - Space Shuttle Atlantis leaves an observatory in Earth's orbit to study gamma rays before returning on April 11. It is followed by Space Shuttle Discovery, which studies instruments related to the Strategic Defense Initiative from April 29 to May 6.
- April 17 – The Dow Jones Industrial Average closes above 3,000 for the first time ever, at 3,004.46.
- April 26 – Seventy tornadoes break out in the central United States, killing 17 people. The most notable tornado of the day strikes Andover, Kansas.

=== May ===
- May 3 – Wisconsin butter fire in Madison.
- May 5 – 1991 Washington, D.C. riot: A riot breaks out in the Mount Pleasant section of Washington, D.C. after police shoot a Salvadorean man.
- May 6 – Time magazine publishes "The Thriving Cult of Greed and Power", an article highly critical of the Scientology organization.
- May 16 – Queen Elizabeth II becomes the first British monarch to address the United States Congress, during a 13-day royal visit in Washington, D.C.
- May 25 – The Pittsburgh Penguins defeat the Minnesota North Stars 8–0 in Game 6 to win their first Stanley Cup in the ice hockey franchise history.

=== June ===
- June 4 – A large solar flare triggers an unusually large aurora as far south as Pennsylvania.
- June 5 – STS-40: Space Shuttle Columbia carries the Spacelab Life Sciences 1 module into orbit.
- June 7 – National Victory Celebration: Approximately 200,000 people attend a parade of 8,800 returning Persian Gulf War troops in Washington, D.C.
- June 10 – As she goes home from school, 11-year-old Jaycee Lee Dugard is kidnapped in Meyers, California. She will not be found for 18 years.
- June 12 – The Chicago Bulls win their first NBA championship by defeating the Los Angeles Lakers.
- June 13 – A spectator is killed by lightning at the U.S. Open (golf) at Hazeltine National Golf Club in Minnesota.
- June 16 – Father's Day bank massacre: Four security guards are shot to death during a bank robbery at the United Bank Tower in Denver, Colorado. The former police officer subsequently charged with the crime is acquitted, and the case remains unsolved.
- June 17 – 12th U.S. President Zachary Taylor, who died 141 years earlier in 1850, is exhumed to discover whether or not his death was caused by arsenic poisoning, instead of acute gastrointestinal illness; no trace of arsenic is found.
- June 23 – Sonic the Hedgehog is released in the United States. Nearly one million copies are sold here by Christmas, and nearly 2 million copies worldwide by the end of the year.
- June 27 – Supreme Court Justice Thurgood Marshall, the first African American appointed to the court, announces his retirement from the Supreme Court due to declining health. In his retirement press conference on the following day, he expressed his view that race should not be the basis in selecting his successor.
- June 28 – The 5.6 M_{w} Sierra Madre earthquake shook the Greater Los Angeles Area with a maximum Mercalli intensity of VII (Very strong), causing two deaths, 27–40 injuries, and $33.5–40 million in losses.

=== July ===
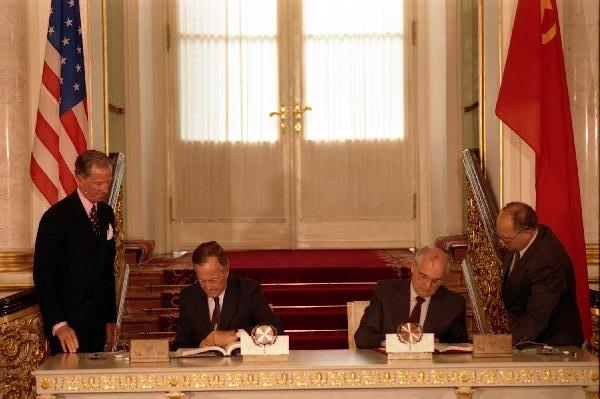
July 31: START I

- July 1
  - President George H. W. Bush nominates Clarence Thomas as the replacement for Associate Justice Thurgood Marshall; he will be the second African American appointed.
  - Telephone services go down in Washington, D.C., Pittsburgh, Los Angeles and San Francisco as a result of a software bug, affecting nearly 12 million customers.
- July 4 – Salute Your Shorts debuts on Nickelodeon.
- July 7 – The United States men's national soccer team win the first ever CONCACAF Gold Cup against Honduras in the Final on penalties.
- July 9 – Iran–Contra affair: Alan Fiers agrees to plead guilty to two charges of lying to the U.S. Congress. On September 16, D.C. Judge Gerhard Gesell issues a ruling clearing Col. Oliver North of all charges.
- July 11 – A solar eclipse of record totality occurs, seen first in Hawaii. It then enters Mexico with the path directly crossing Cabo San Lucas and Mexico City, where it is seen by 20,000,000 inhabitants, and finally ends in Colombia in South America.
- July 22
  - Boxer Mike Tyson is arrested and charged with raping Desiree Washington, a Miss Black America contestant, three days earlier, in Indianapolis, Indiana.
  - Serial killer Jeffrey Dahmer is arrested after the remains of eleven men and boys are found in his Milwaukee, Wisconsin apartment. Police soon find out that he is involved in six more murders.
- July 29 – In New York City, a grand jury indicts Bank of Credit and Commerce International of the largest bank fraud in history, accusing it of defrauding depositors of US$5 billion.
- July 31 – The United States and the Soviet Union sign the START I treaty in Moscow limiting strategic nuclear weapons.

=== August ===
- August 11 – Nickelodeon introduces its series of Nicktoons, with Doug, Rugrats and The Ren & Stimpy Show the first three to air.
- August 19 – Hurricane Bob hits the Northeastern United States.
- August 23 – The Super Nintendo Entertainment System is first released in the United States.
- August 26 – The World Wrestling Federation holds its SummerSlam event AT Madison Square Garden in New York City, New York.
- August 31 – What Would You Do? debuts on Nickelodeon.

=== September ===
- September 2 – Dissolution of the Soviet Union: The United States recognizes the independence of Estonia, Latvia and Lithuania.
- September 3 – In Hamlet, North Carolina, a grease fire breaks out at the Imperial Foods chicken processing plant, killing 25 people.
- September 8–12 – Tailhook scandal: At the 35th Annual Tailhook Symposium in Las Vegas, 83 women and seven men are assaulted by U.S. Navy and Marine aviation officers.
- September 11
  - Continental Express Flight 2574 crashes in Texas
  - "Smells Like Teen Spirit" by Nirvana is released.
- September 16 – The trial of the deposed Panamanian dictator Manuel Noriega begins in the U.S.
- September 17 – Home Improvement premieres on ABC.
- September 20–21 – In Sandy, Utah, several patients are held hostage and a nurse is killed in the Alta View Hospital hostage incident.
- September 24 – Nirvana release their most popular album, Nevermind, which ultimately sells 11 million copies in the U.S.
- September 27 – U.S. President George H. W. Bush announces unilateral reductions in short-range nuclear weapons and calls off 24-hour alerts for long-range bombers. The Soviet Union responds with similar unilateral reductions on October 5.

=== October ===
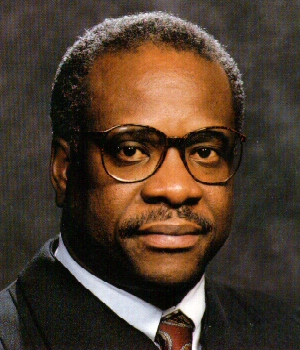
October 15: The Senate confirms Clarence Thomas to the Supreme Court

- October 2 – Arkansas Governor Bill Clinton announces he will seek the 1992 Democratic nomination for President of the United States.
- October 3 – Speaker of the U.S. House of Representatives Tom Foley announces the closure of the House Bank by the end of the year after revelations that House members have written numerous bad checks.
- October 11–13 – The U.S. Senate Judiciary Committee interviews both Supreme Court candidate Clarence Thomas and former aide Anita Hill, who alleges that Thomas sexually harassed her while she worked for him.
- October 15 – United States Senate votes 52–48 to confirm Judge Clarence Thomas to the Supreme Court of the United States.
- October 16 – Luby's shooting: George Hennard guns down 24 people in a restaurant in Killeen, Texas before committing suicide. Thia ia the largest mass shooting by a single person in the United States until 2007.
- October 20 – The Oakland Hills firestorm kills 25 people and destroys 3,469 homes and apartments.
- October 27 – The Minnesota Twins win the World Series in baseball against the Atlanta Braves.
- October 28–November 4 – The 1991 Perfect Storm strikes the northeastern U.S. coast and Atlantic Canada, causing over US$200 million of damage and resulting in 12 direct fatalities.
- October 29 – The American Galileo spacecraft makes its closest approach to 951 Gaspra, becoming the first probe to visit an asteroid.
- October 31–November 3 – The Halloween blizzard hits the Upper Midwest, killing 22 people and causing US$100 million in damage.

=== November ===
- November 1 – University of Iowa shooting: Former alumnus Gang Lu kills five people before committing suicide.
- November 5 – David Duke, a white separatist running as a Republican, loses the Louisiana Governor's race to Democratic candidate Edwin Edwards, by an overwhelming margin despite winning the majority of the white vote.
- November 7 – Los Angeles Lakers point guard Magic Johnson announces that he has HIV, effectively ending his NBA career.
- November 14
  - American and British authorities announce indictments against two Libyan intelligence officials in connection with the bombing of Pan Am Flight 103 over Britain in 1988.
  - In Royal Oak, Michigan, a fired United States Postal Service employee goes on a shooting rampage, killing four people and wounding five others before committing suicide.
- November 22 – Walt Disney Pictures' 30th feature film, Beauty and the Beast, is released, receiving widespread acclaim and box office success, later becoming the first animated film to be nominated for the Academy Award for Best Picture at the 64th Academy Awards in early 1992. Many consider the film as Disney's magnum opus and one of the greatest animated movies ever made.
- November 26 – Michael Jackson releases Dangerous, selling 5 million copies in the first week.
- November 30 – The United States women's national soccer team win the first ever FIFA Women's World Cup in China against Norway in the Final.

=== December ===
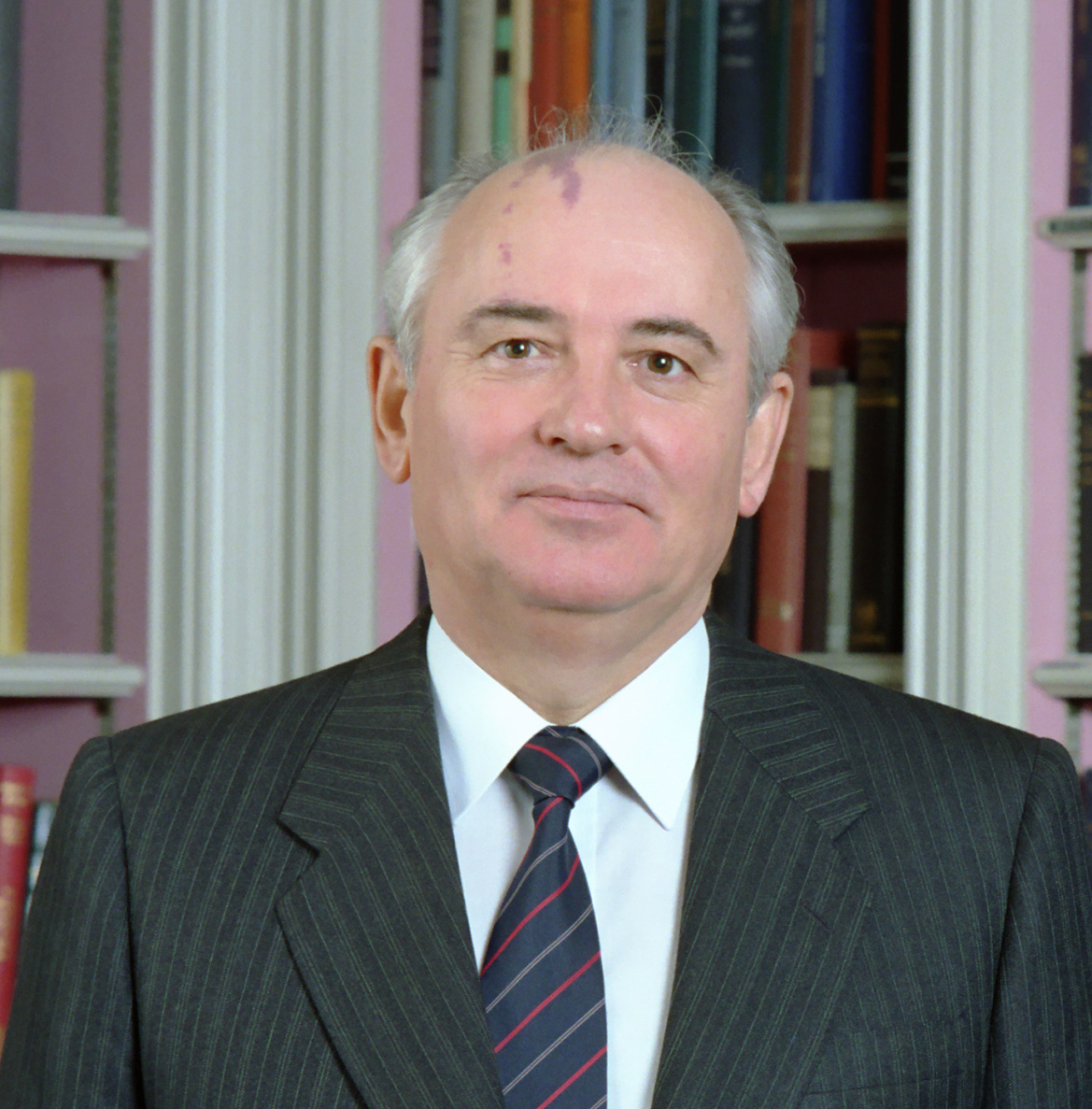
December 25: The resignation of Mikhail Gorbachev marked one of the final acts in the Dissolution of the Soviet Union

- December 4 –
  - Journalist Terry A. Anderson is released after seven years' captivity as a hostage in Beirut (the last and longest-held American hostage in Lebanon).
  - David Duke announces he would seek the presidential nomination of the Republican Party against incumbent President George H. W. Bush.
  - John Leonard Orr, one of the most prolific serial arsonists of the 20th century, is arrested in California.
  - Pan Am is officially dissolved after 64 years of operation
- December 7 – 50th anniversary of the Attack on Pearl Harbor.
- December 11 –Pat Buchanan announces he would seek the presidential nomination of the Republican Party against incumbent President George H. W. Bush.
- December 20 – A Missouri court imposes a death sentence on Palestinian militant Zein Isa and his wife Maria, for the honor killing of their daughter Palestina.
- December 25–26 – The Cold War (1947–1991) ends as President of the Soviet Union Mikhail Gorbachev resigns and the Soviet Union dissolves.

=== Ongoing ===
- Iraqi no-fly zones (1991–2003)

== Births ==
=== January ===
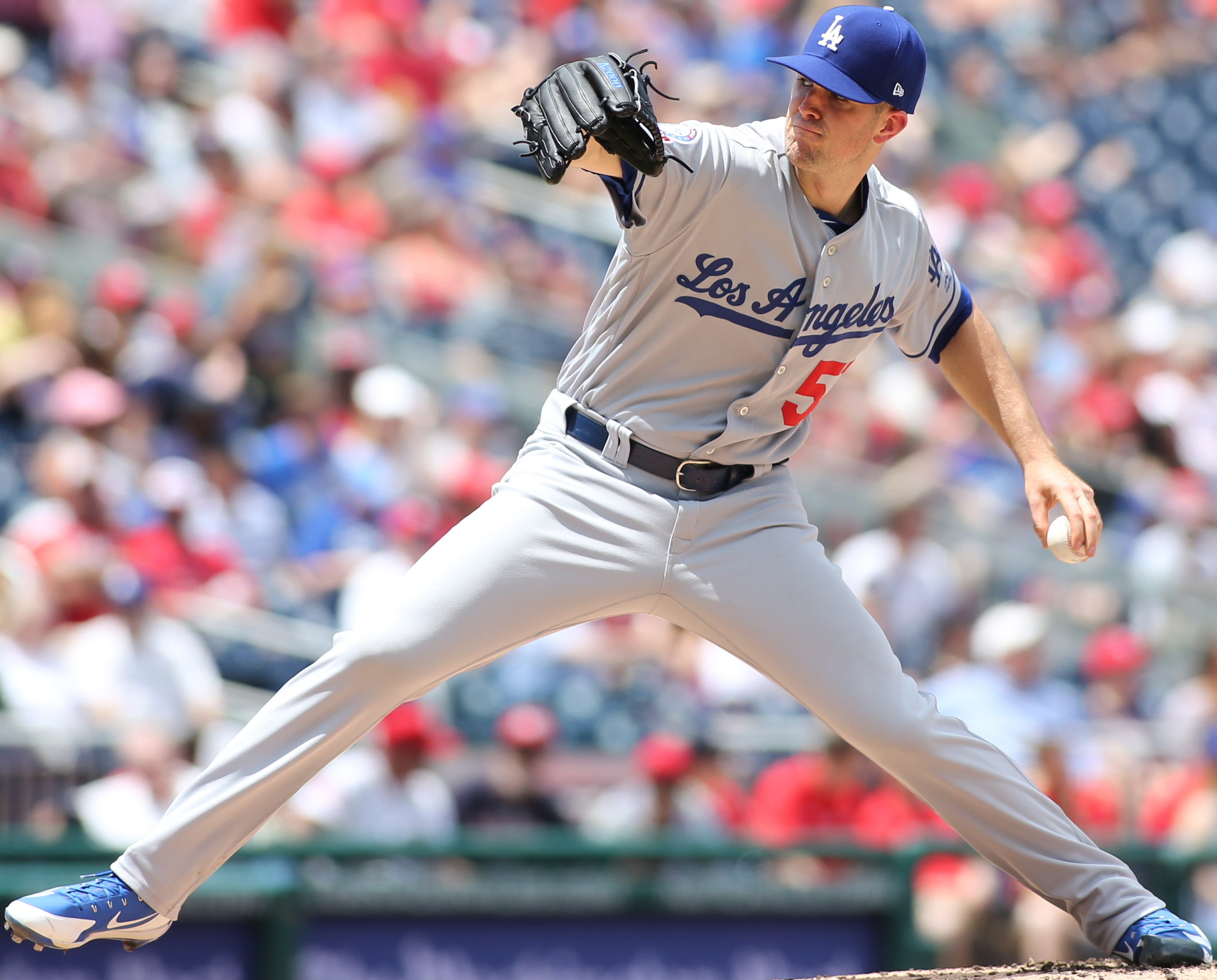
Alex Wood

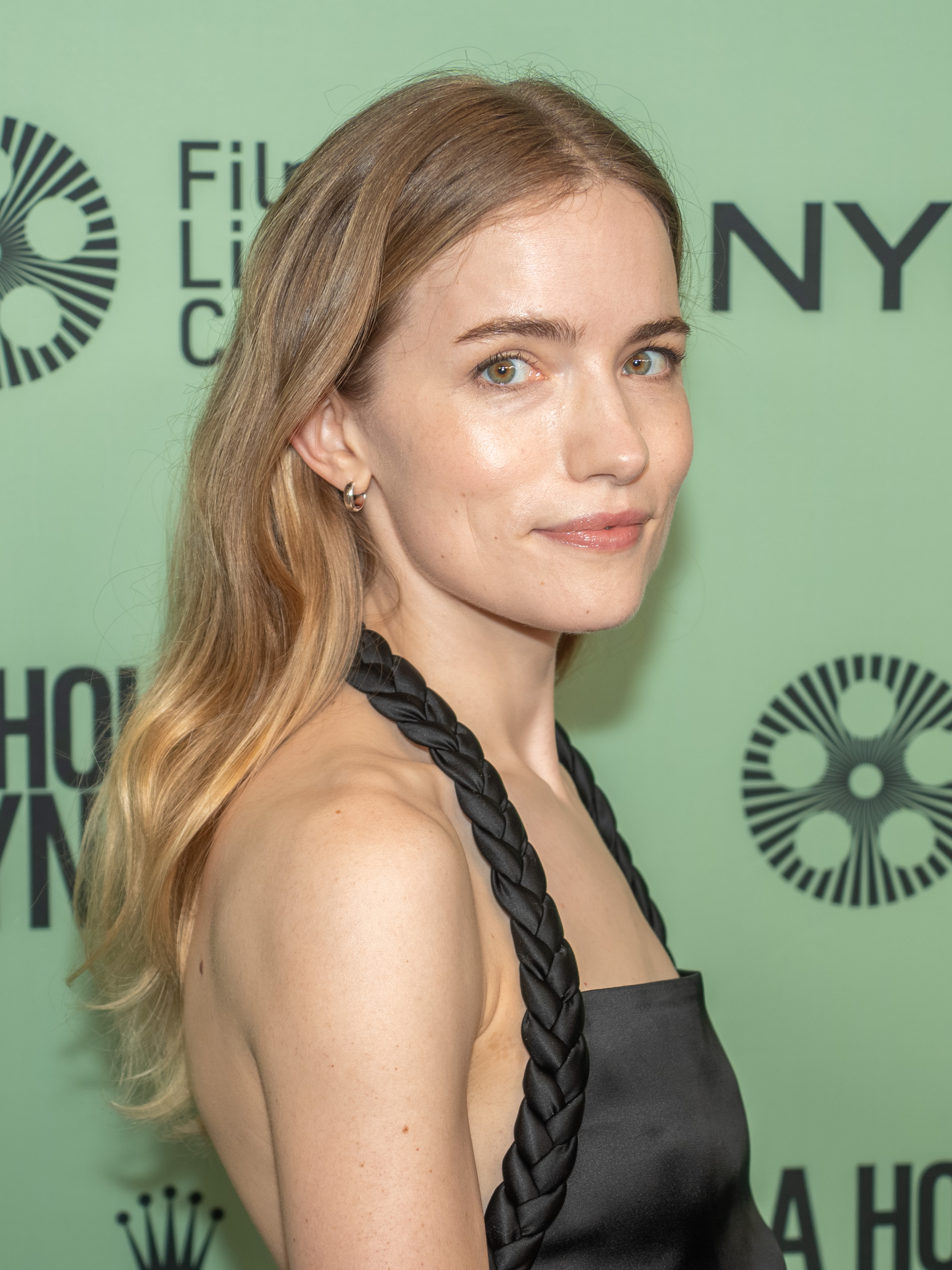
Willa Fitzgerald

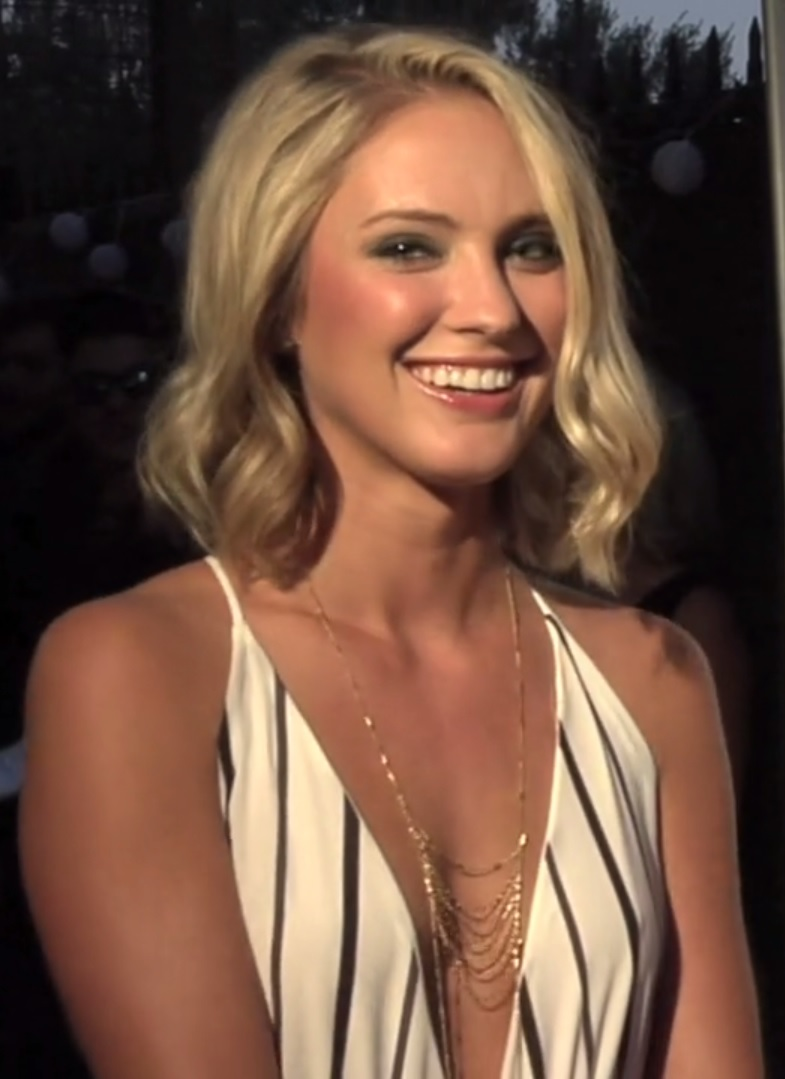
Ciara Hanna

- January 1
  - Darius Slay, football player
  - Mark L. Young, actor
- January 3 – Darius Morris, basketball player (d. 2024)
- January 4
  - Alexandra Grey, actress, singer/songwriter and producer
  - Charles Melton, actor and model
- January 7 – Michaela Jaé Rodriguez, actress and singer
- January 8
  - Shaun Abreu, politician and tenants' rights attorney
  - Zachary Donohue, ice dancer
- January 9 – 3lau, DJ and electronic dance music producer
- January 12
  - Raquel Rodriguez, wrestler
  - Alex Wood, baseball player
- January 14 – Jeanine Mason, actress and dancer
- January 17
  - Trevor Bauer, baseball player
  - Willa Fitzgerald, actress
  - Alise Willoughby, BMX racer
- January 19 – Erin Sanders, actress
- January 20 – Ciara Hanna, actress and model
- January 23 – Steve Birnbaum, soccer player
- January 26 – Rachel DiPillo, actress
- January 27 – Daniel Hemric, stock car driver
- January 28
  - Mallory Burdette, tennis player
  - C. J. Harris, singer (d. 2023)
- January 30 – videogamedunkey, YouTuber
- January 31 – Trinity K. Bonet, drag queen

=== February ===
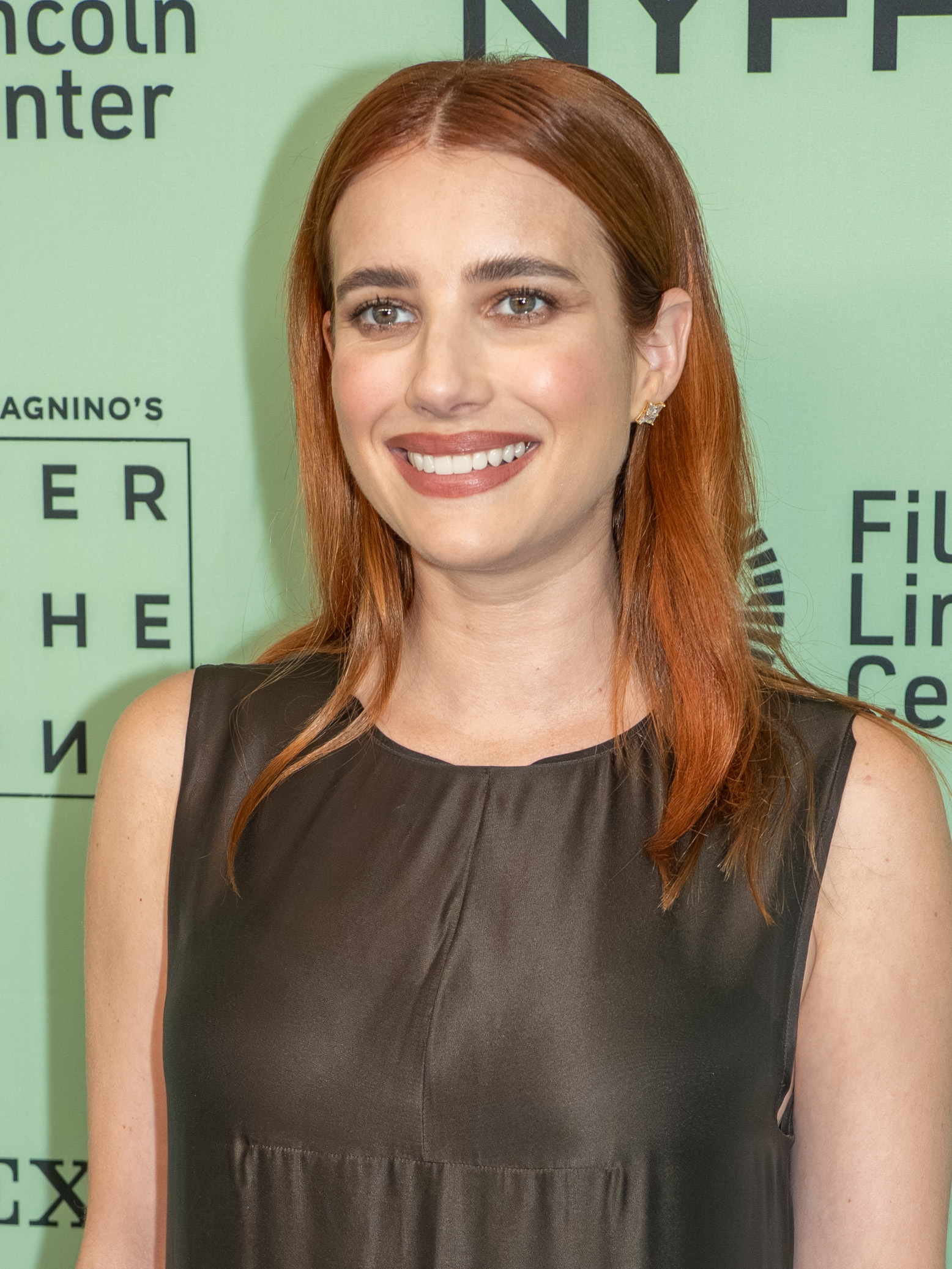
Emma Roberts

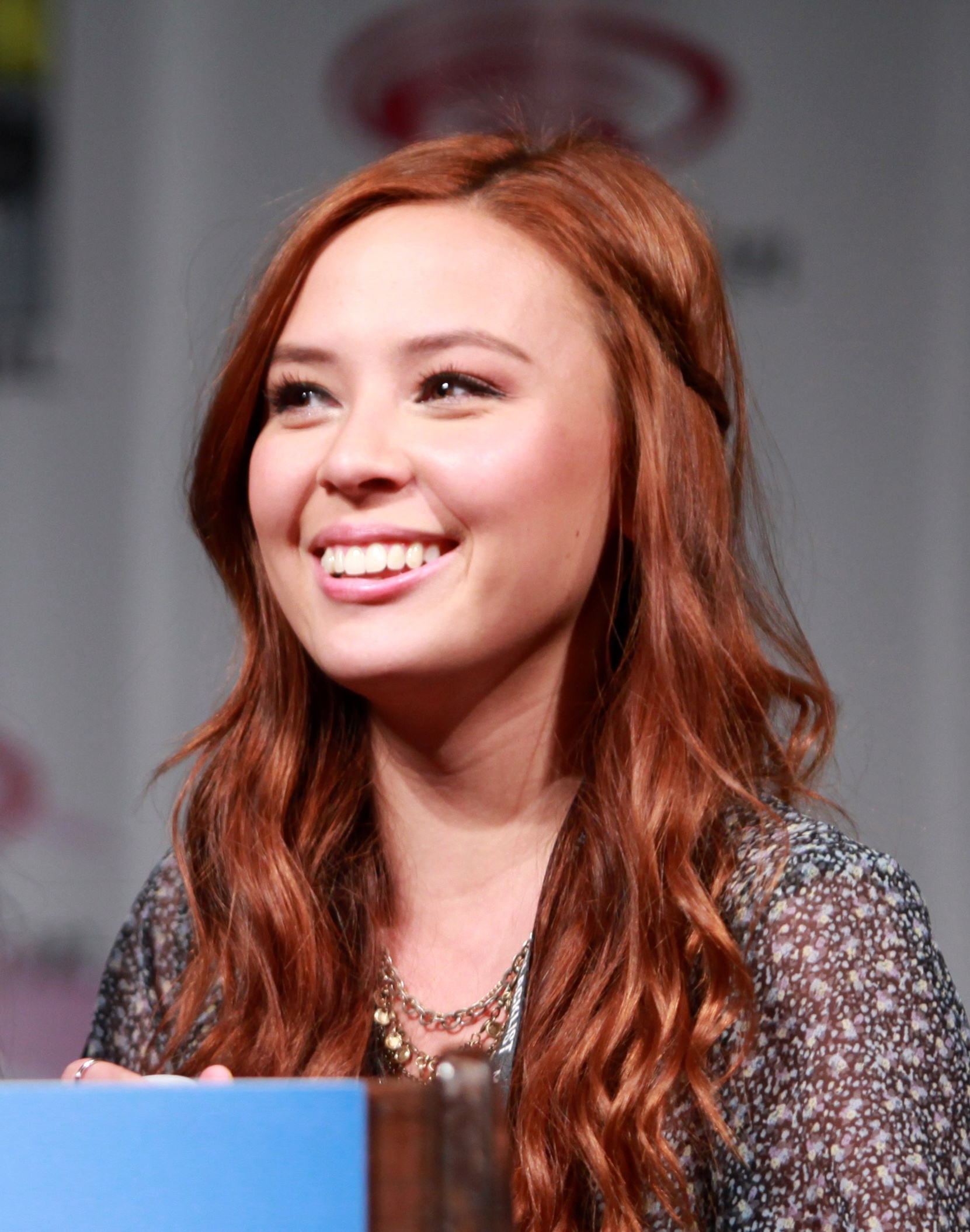
Malese Jow

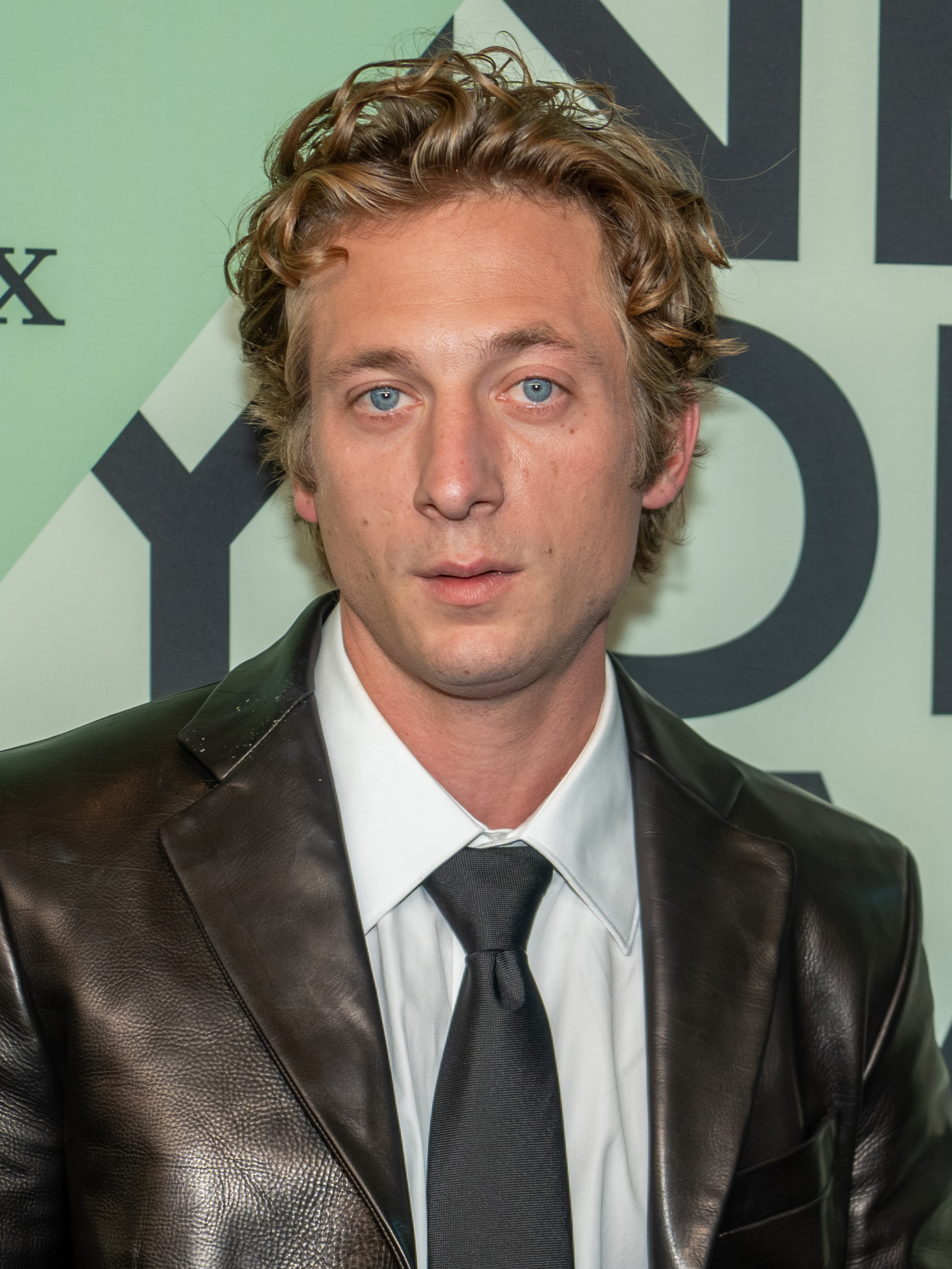
Jeremy Allen White

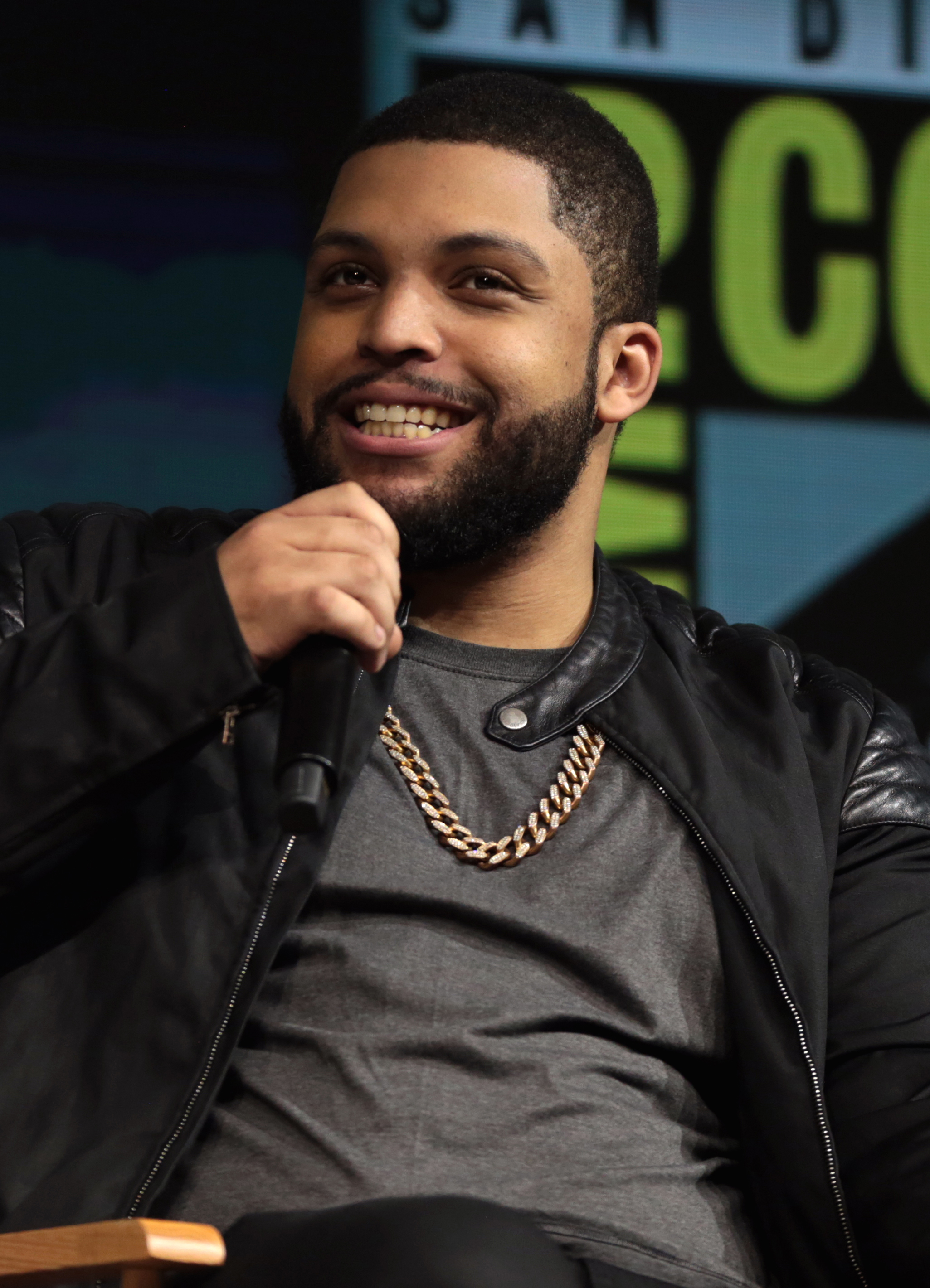
O'Shea Jackson Jr.

- February 1 – Jasmine Tookes, model
- February 2 – Matthew Boyd, baseball player
- February 3
  - Gavin Escobar, football player (d. 2022)
  - Glenn McCuen, actor, model and gymnast
- February 5 – Kelvin Benjamin, football player
- February 7 – Gabbie Hanna, YouTuber
- February 9 – Logan Ryan, football player
- February 10
  - C. J. Anderson, football player
  - Emma Roberts, actress
- February 11 – Christofer Drew, singer
- February 12
  - Casey Abrams, singer
  - Devin Patrick Kelley, mass murderer
- February 13 – Daniel O'Shea, Olympic ice skater
- February 14 – J. J. Wilcox, football player
- February 15 – Rich Swann, wrestler
- February 16
  - Maurice Alexander, football player
  - Terrence Boyd, soccer player
  - Micah Stephen Williams, actor
- February 17 – Jeremy Allen White, actor
- February 18 – Malese Jow, actress and singer
- February 19
  - Trevor Bayne, race car driver
  - Lina Hidalgo, politician and judge
  - Adreian Payne, basketball player (d. 2022)
- February 22
  - Mariah Bullock, American-born Samoan footballer
  - Khalil Mack, football player
- February 24
  - Emily DiDonato, model
  - Madison Hubbell, ice dancer
  - O'Shea Jackson Jr., rapper and actor, son of Ice Cube
- February 25
  - Levi Benton, singer and frontman for Miss May I
  - Kristie Mewis, soccer player
  - Tony Oller, actor and singer
- February 26 – Lex Scott Davis, actress
- February 27 – Carmela Zumbado, actress

=== March ===
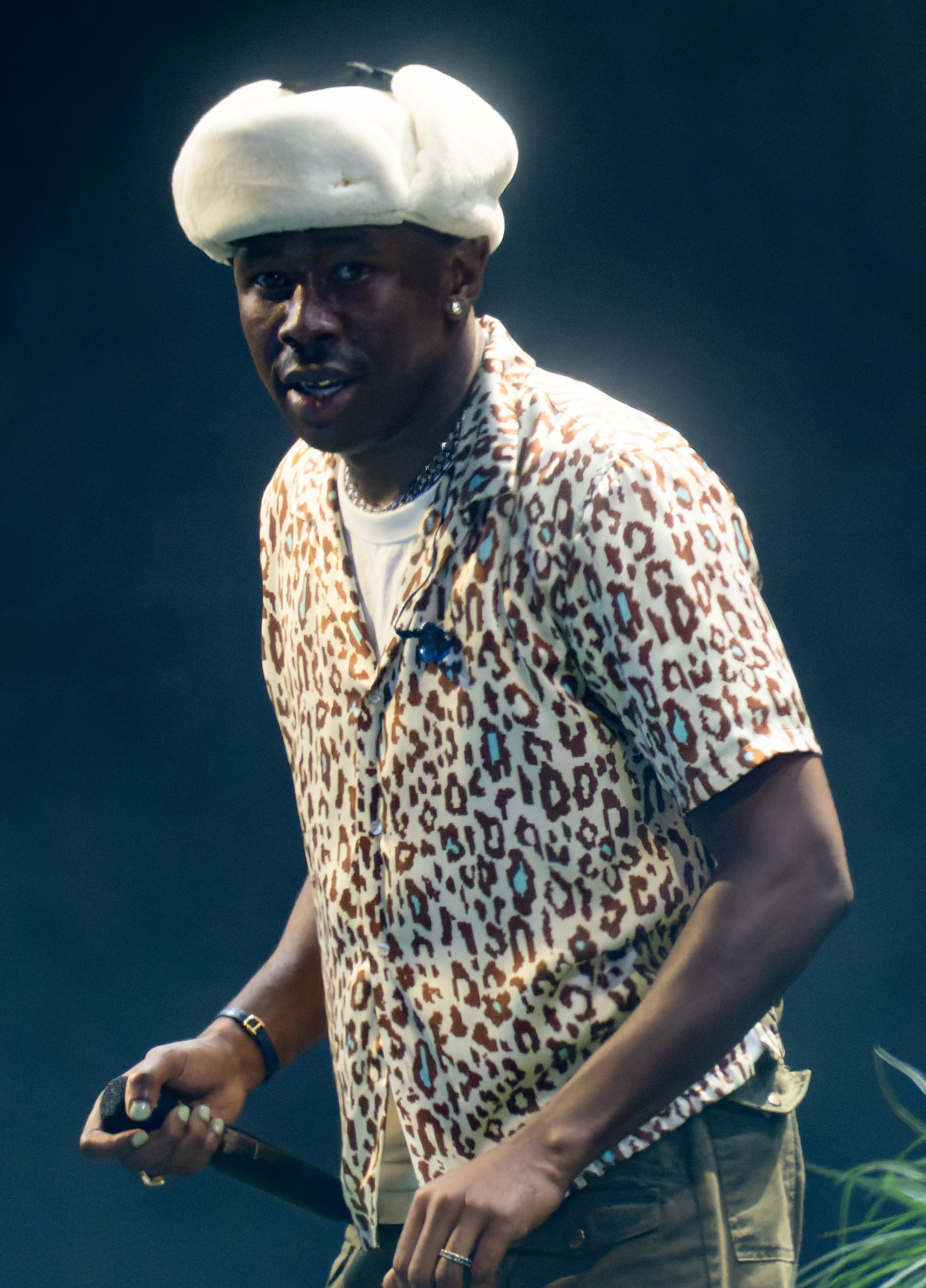
Tyler, the Creator

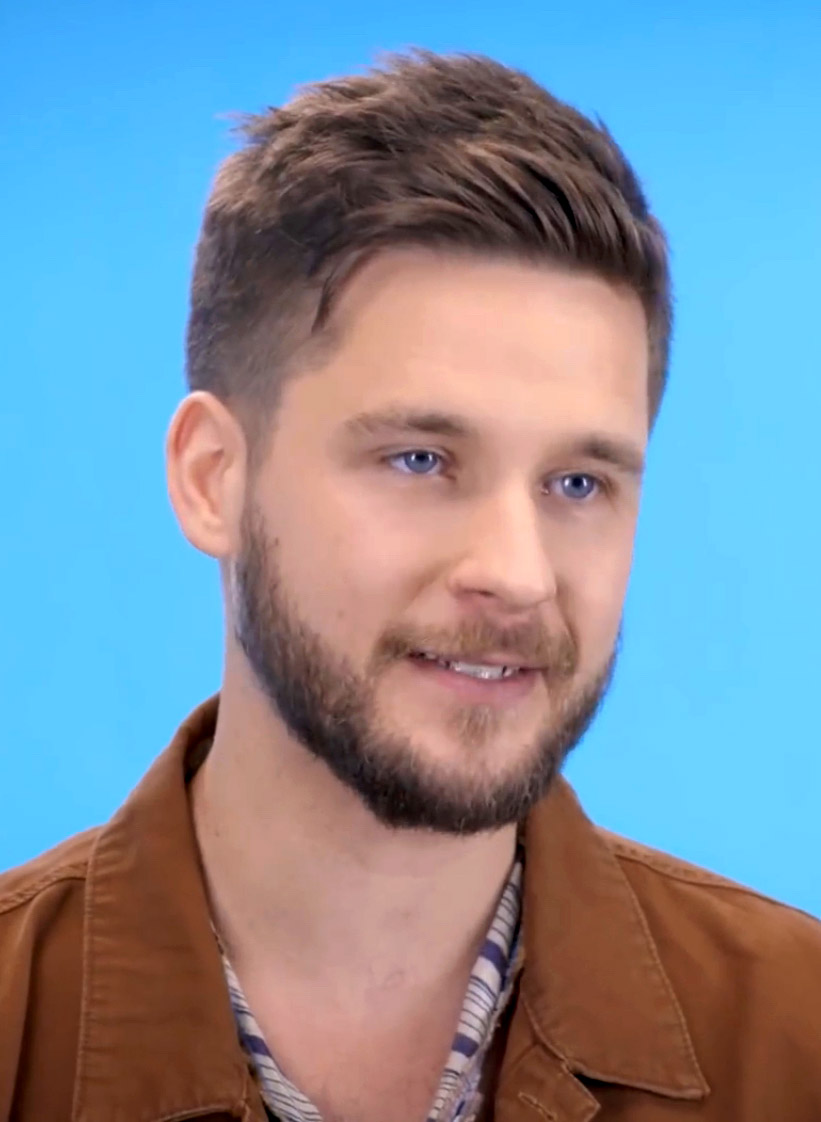
Devon Werkheiser

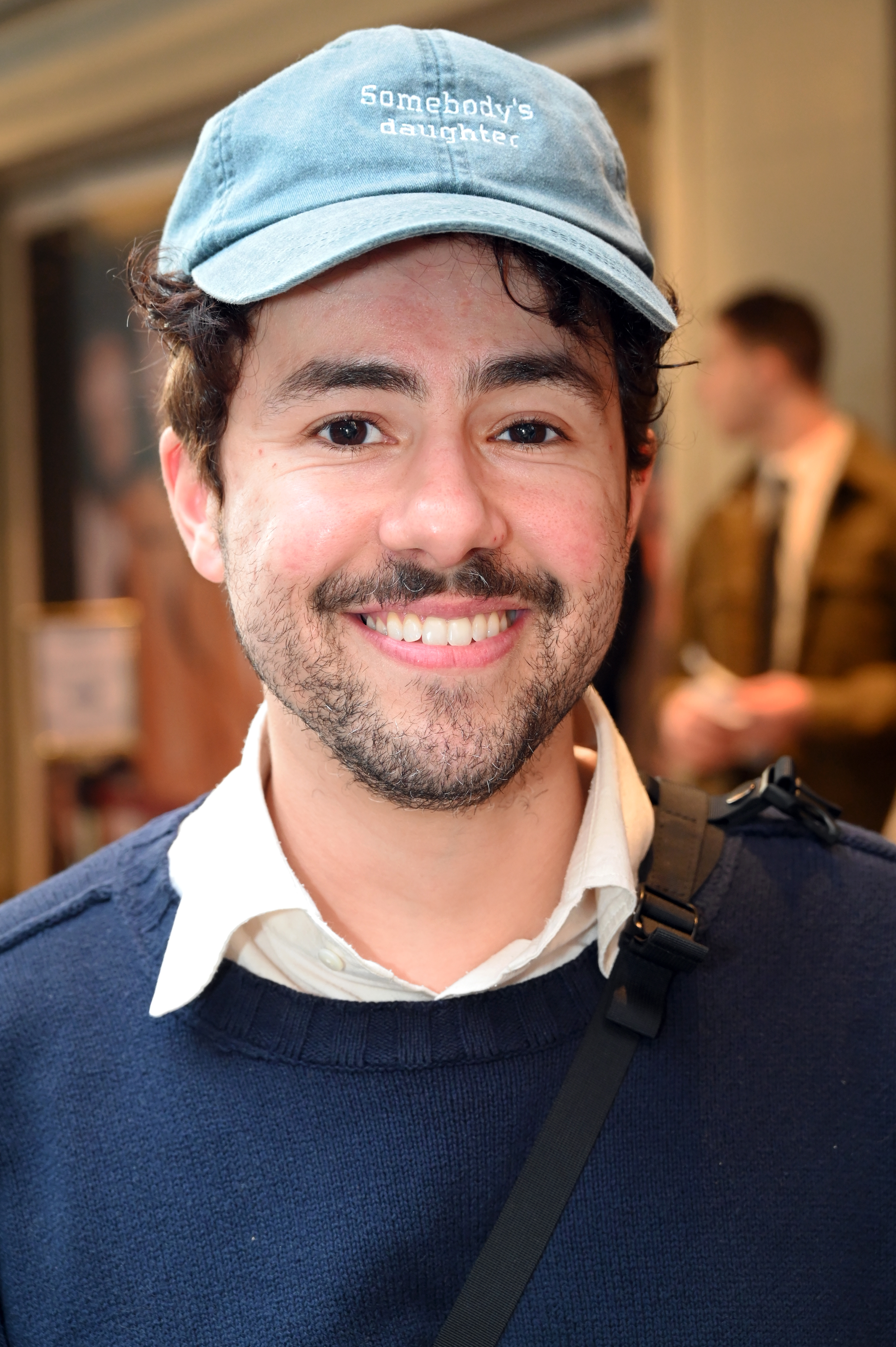
Ramy Youssef

- March 6
  - Nicole Fox, fashion model and actress
  - Lex Luger, musician and record producer
  - Tyler, the Creator, rapper
- March 7
  - Chuck Aoki, Paralympic wheelchair rugby player, previously wheelchair basketball player
  - Ian Clark, basketball player
- March 8
  - Kina Collins, community organizer, activist and political candidate
  - Devon Werkheiser, actor, singer-songwriter and musician
- March 16
  - Reggie Bullock, basketball player
  - Wolfgang Van Halen, musician
- March 17 – Joe Rau, wrestler
- March 18 – Travis Frederick, football player
- March 19
  - Garrett Clayton, actor, dancer and singer
  - Ian Terry, television personality
- March 23 – Madelyn Deutch, actress, director, musician and writer
- March 25 – Seychelle Gabriel, actress
- March 26
  - Ari Lennox, R&B singer
  - Ramy Youssef, comedian, actor, screenwriter, producer and director
- March 28
  - Amy Bruckner, actress and singer
  - Derek Carr, quarterback
- March 29 – Hayley McFarland, actress
- March 30
  - Mia Carruthers, singer-songwriter
  - Joey Cook, singer
- March 31 – Lukas Magyar, singer and frontman for Veil of Maya

=== April ===
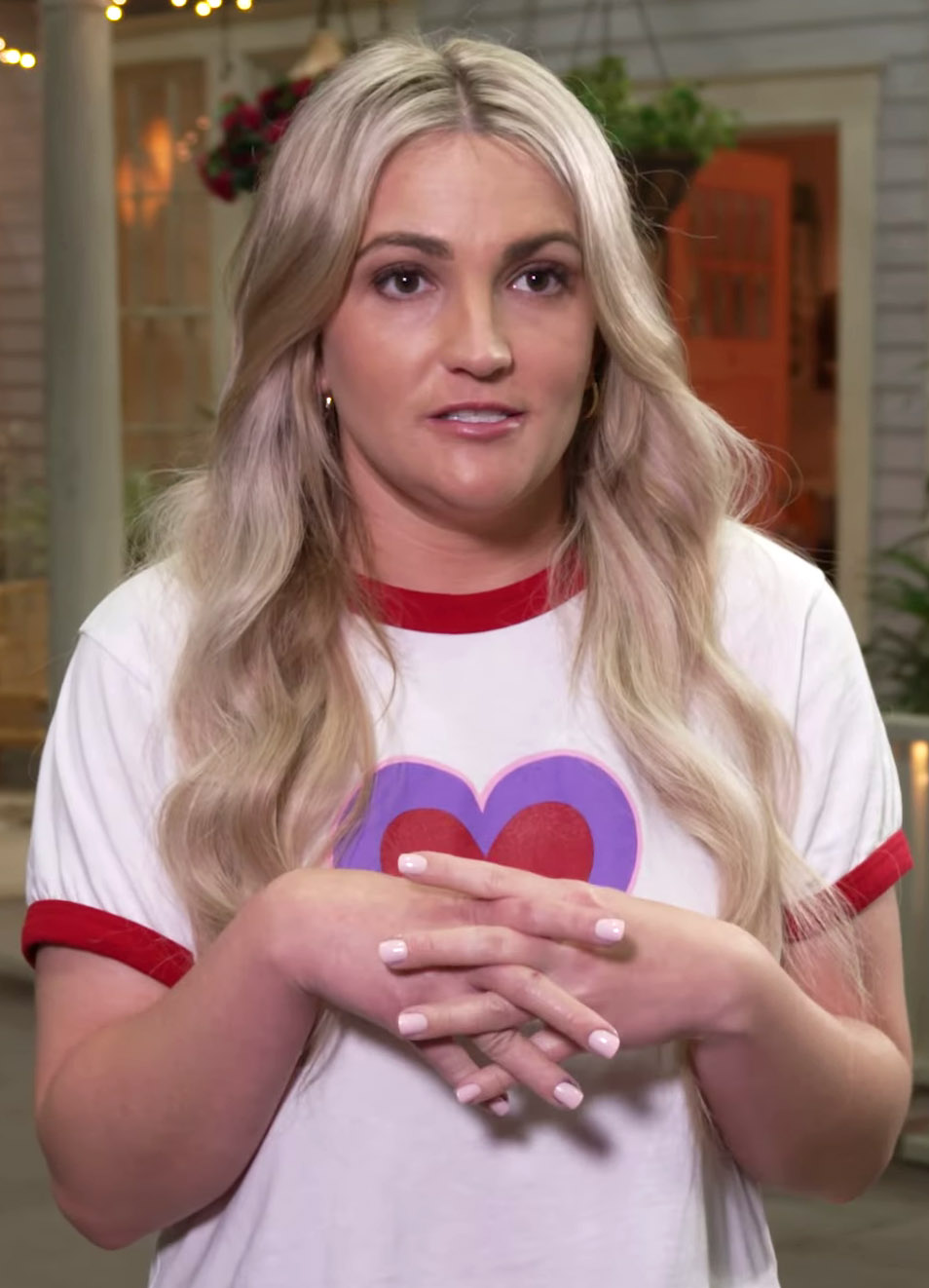
Jamie Lynn Spears

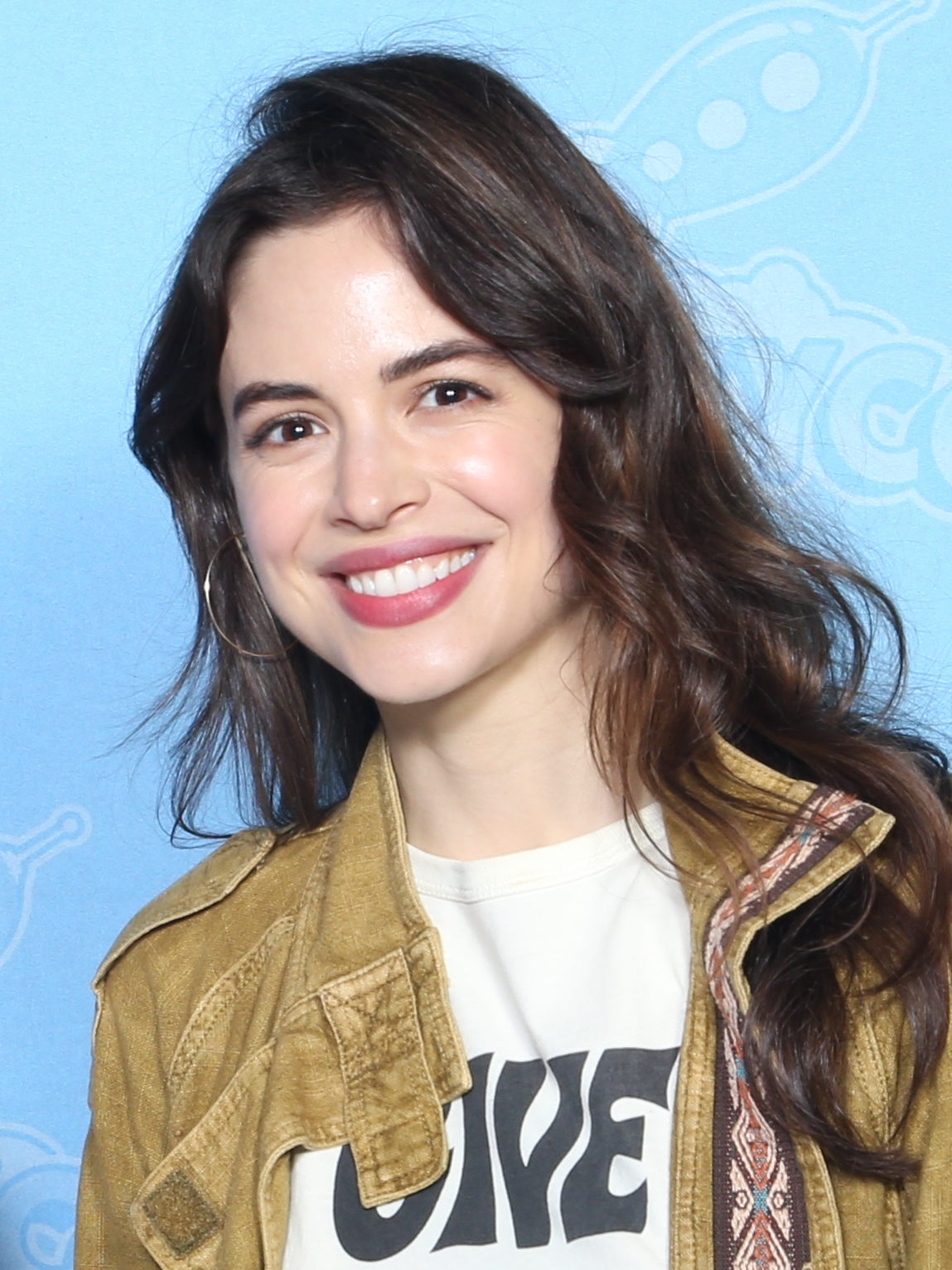
Conor Leslie

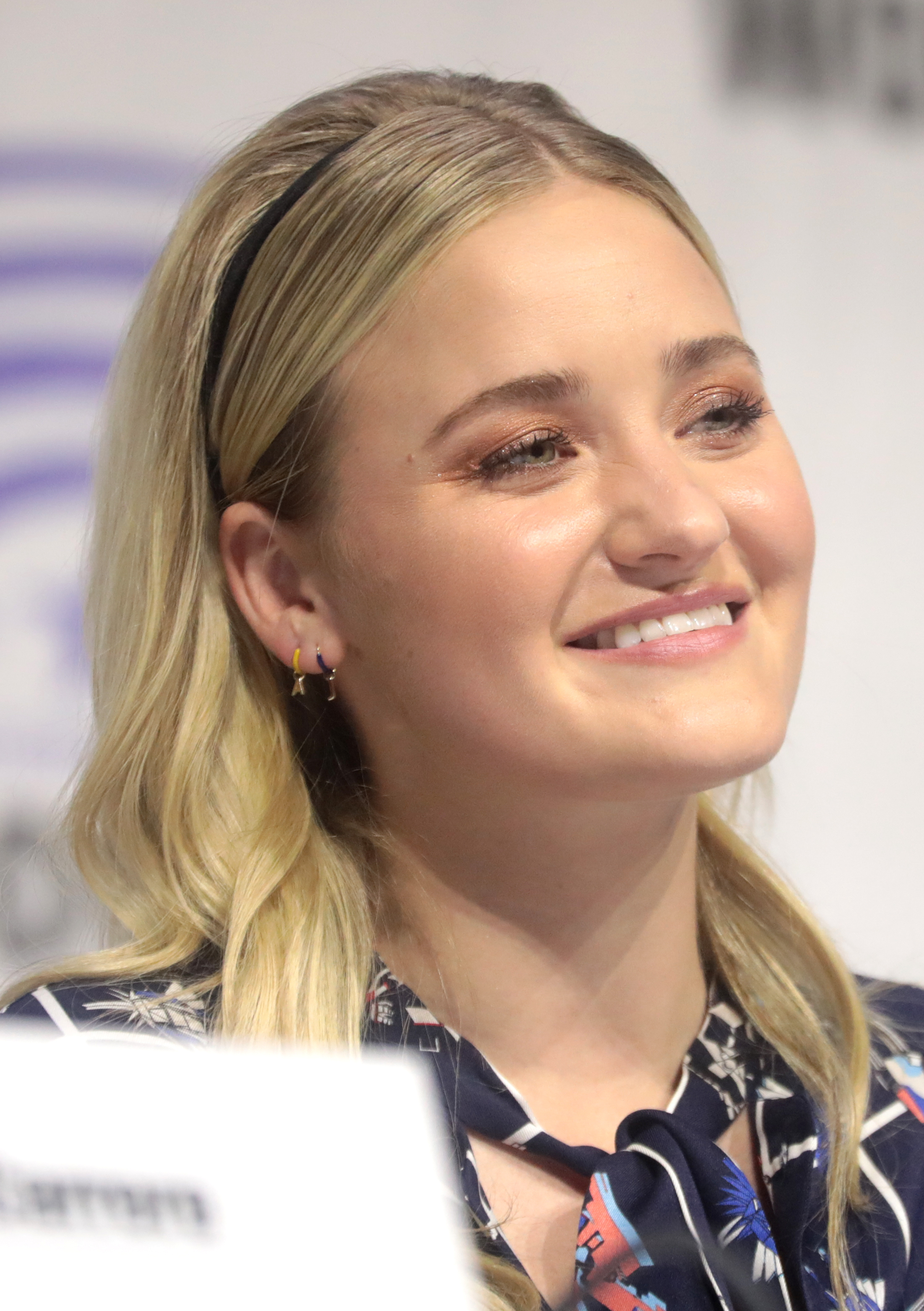
AJ Michalka

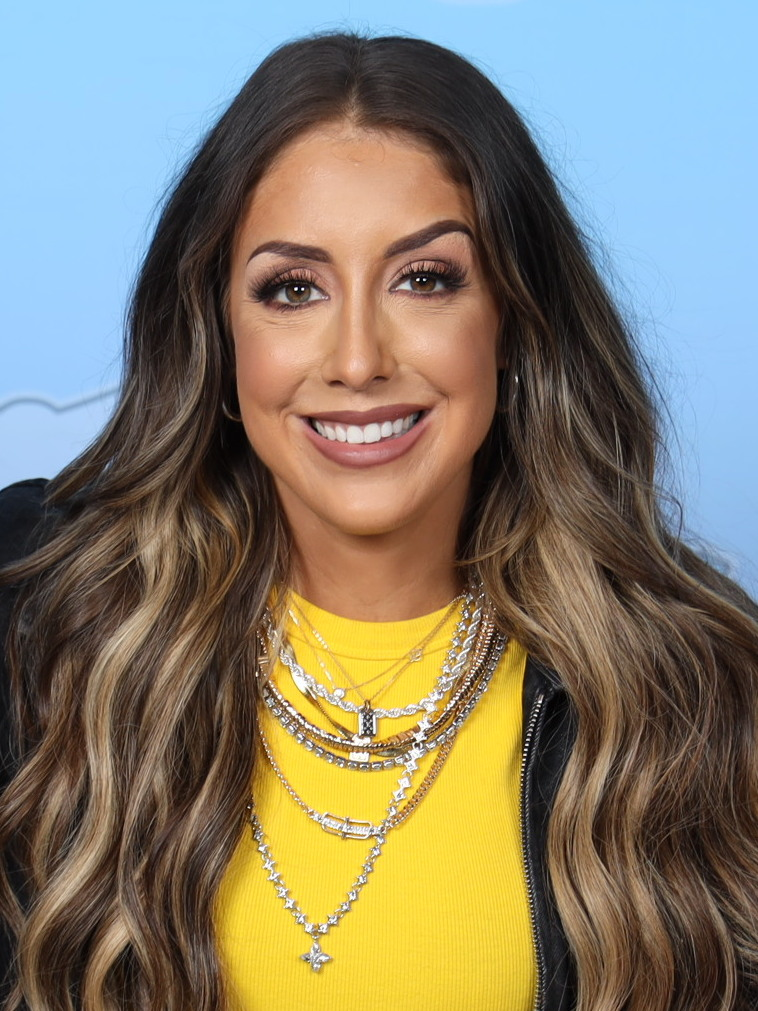
Britt Baker

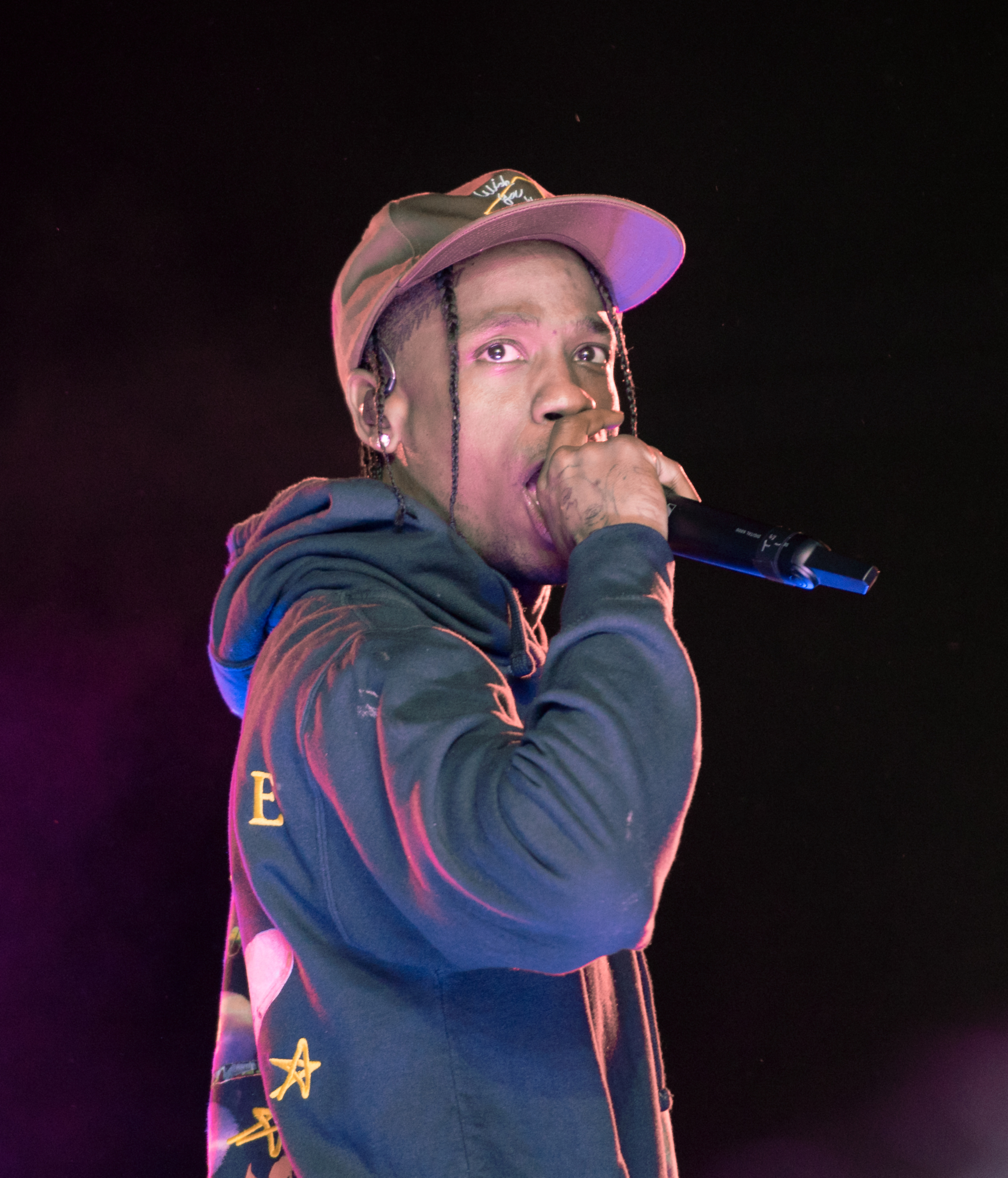
Travis Scott

- April 2 – Quavo, rapper
- April 3 – Hayley Kiyoko, singer and actress
- April 4
  - Jamie Lynn Spears, actress and sister of Britney Spears
  - Jacquelyn Jablonski, model
  - Manuel Gutierrez Jr., makeup YouTuber
- April 5 – Hunter March, TV host, actor and producer
- April 8 – Carl Martin, politician
- April 10
  - Conor Leslie, actress and model
  - AJ Michalka, singer and actress
  - Royce White, basketball player and civil rights activist
- April 11
  - Brennan Poole, racing driver
  - Telvin Smith, American football player
- April 12 – Jack Cooley, basketball player
- April 13 – Dylan Penn, model and actress
- April 15 – Jordan Anderson, professional stock car racing driver and team owner
- April 16 – Nolan Arenado, baseball player
- April 19 – Kelly Olynyk, basketball player
- April 20
  - Luke Kuechly, football player
  - Allie Will, tennis player
- April 22 – Nick Comoroto, pro wrestler
- April 23
  - Britt Baker, professional wrestler and dentist
  - Caleb Johnson, singer
- April 25 – Alex Shibutani, ice dancer
- April 27 – Darren Barnet, actor
- April 28 – Cheslie Kryst, beauty queen and television correspondent (d. 2022)
- April 30 – Travis Scott, rapper

=== May ===
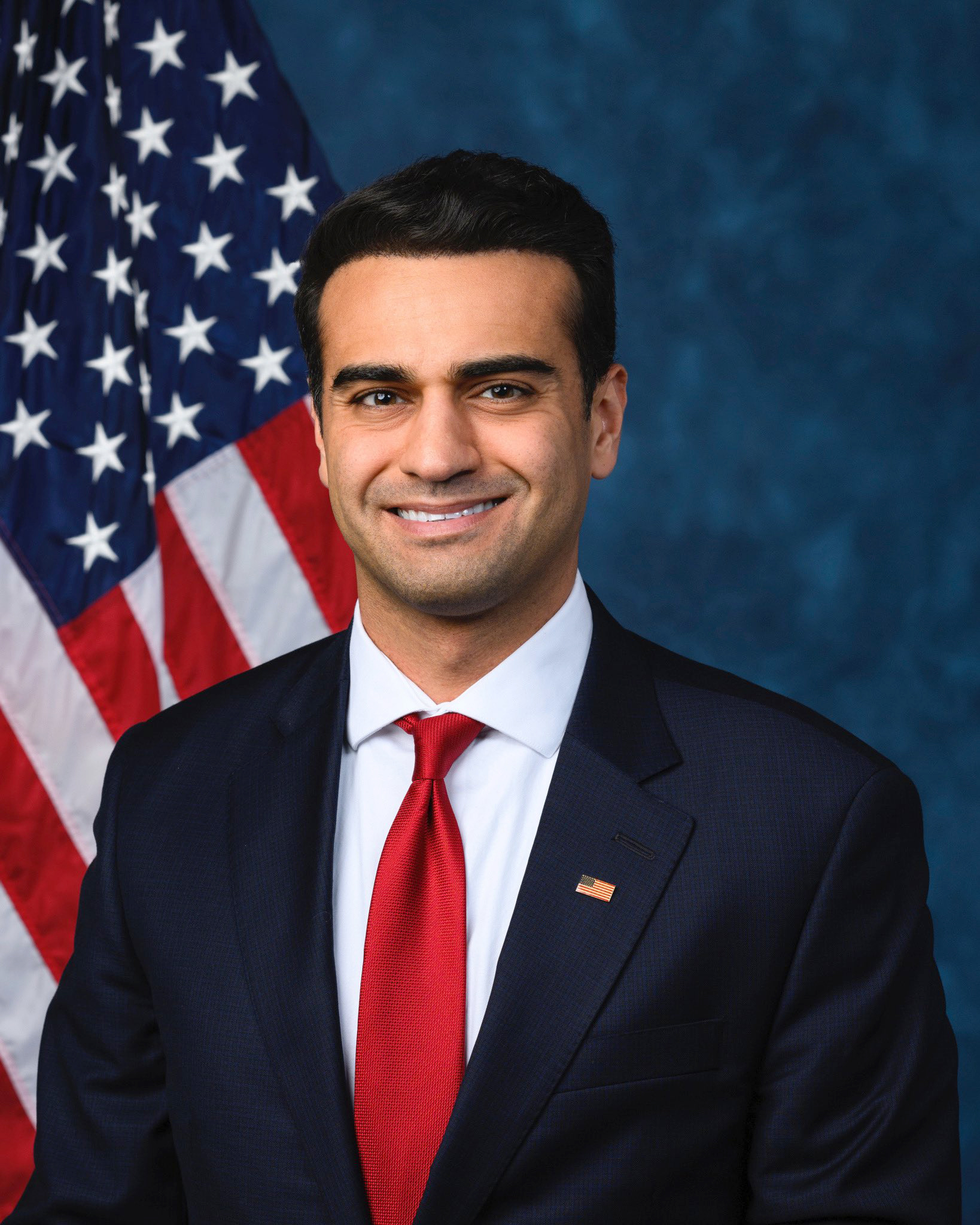
Abraham Hamadeh

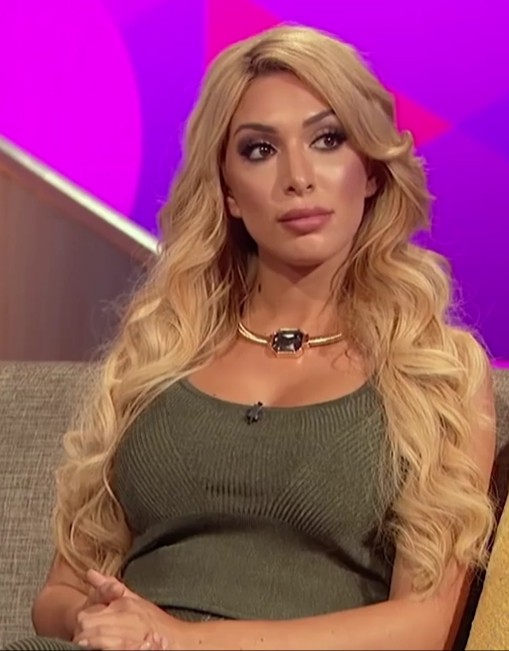
Farrah Abraham

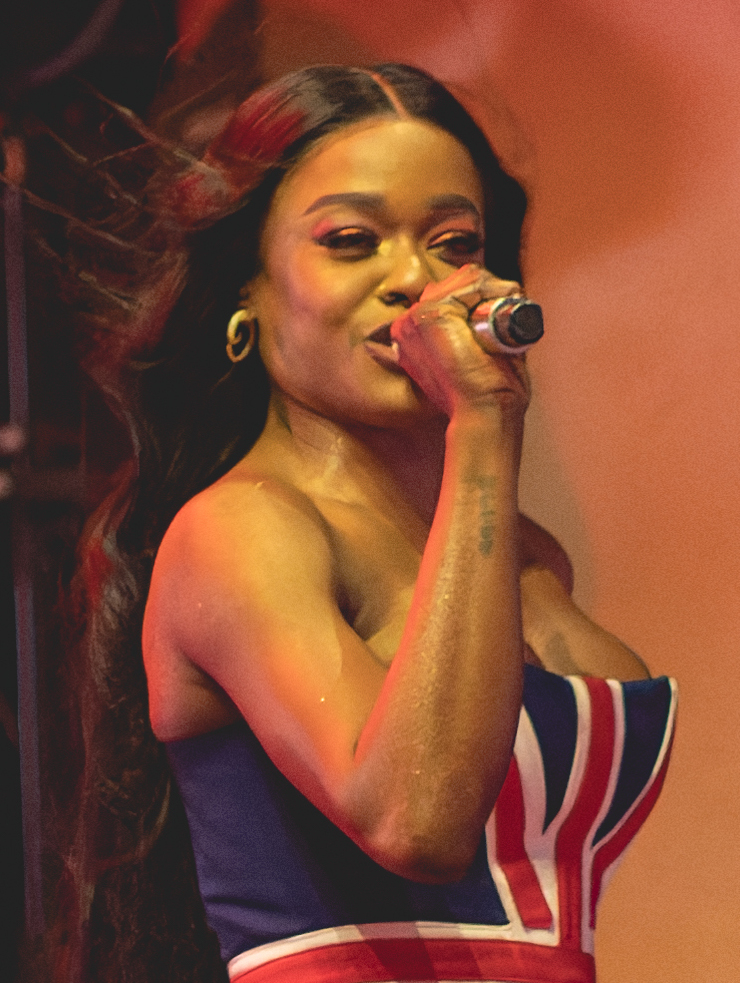
Azealia Banks

- May 1
  - Creagen Dow, actor, producer and screenwriter
  - Marcus Stroman, baseball player
  - Bradley Roby, football player
- May 7
  - Rueben Randle, football player
  - Devyn Tyler, actress
- May 9 – Lionel Boyce, actor, writer, producer and musician
- May 10 – Kenny Beats, record producer
- May 12
  - Jennifer Damiano, Filipino singer and actor
  - Kelsey Lu, singer
- May 13 – Scarlett Bordeaux, professional wrestler and model
- May 15
  - Abraham Hamadeh, politician
  - Nate Wolters, basketball player
- May 16
  - Joey Graceffa, internet personality, actor and author
  - Isaiah Rashad, rapper
- May 17
  - Daniel Curtis Lee, actor, comedian and rapper
  - DJ Akademiks, Jamaican-American blogger
- May 19 – Brittani Kline, model
- May 21 – Sarah Ramos, actress
- May 23 – Aaron Donald, football player
- May 24 – Drew Binsky, travel blogger and vlogger
- May 25 – Derrick Williams, basketball player
- May 26 – Julianna Rose Mauriello, stage actress
- May 27 – Zeke Upshaw, basketball player (d. 2018)
- May 28
  - Mary Beth Barone, comedian and actress
  - Tara Peterson, Olympic curler
- May 29 – Kristen Alderson, actress
- May 31
  - Farrah Abraham, reality television personality
  - Azealia Banks, rapper, singer-songwrite, and actress

=== June ===
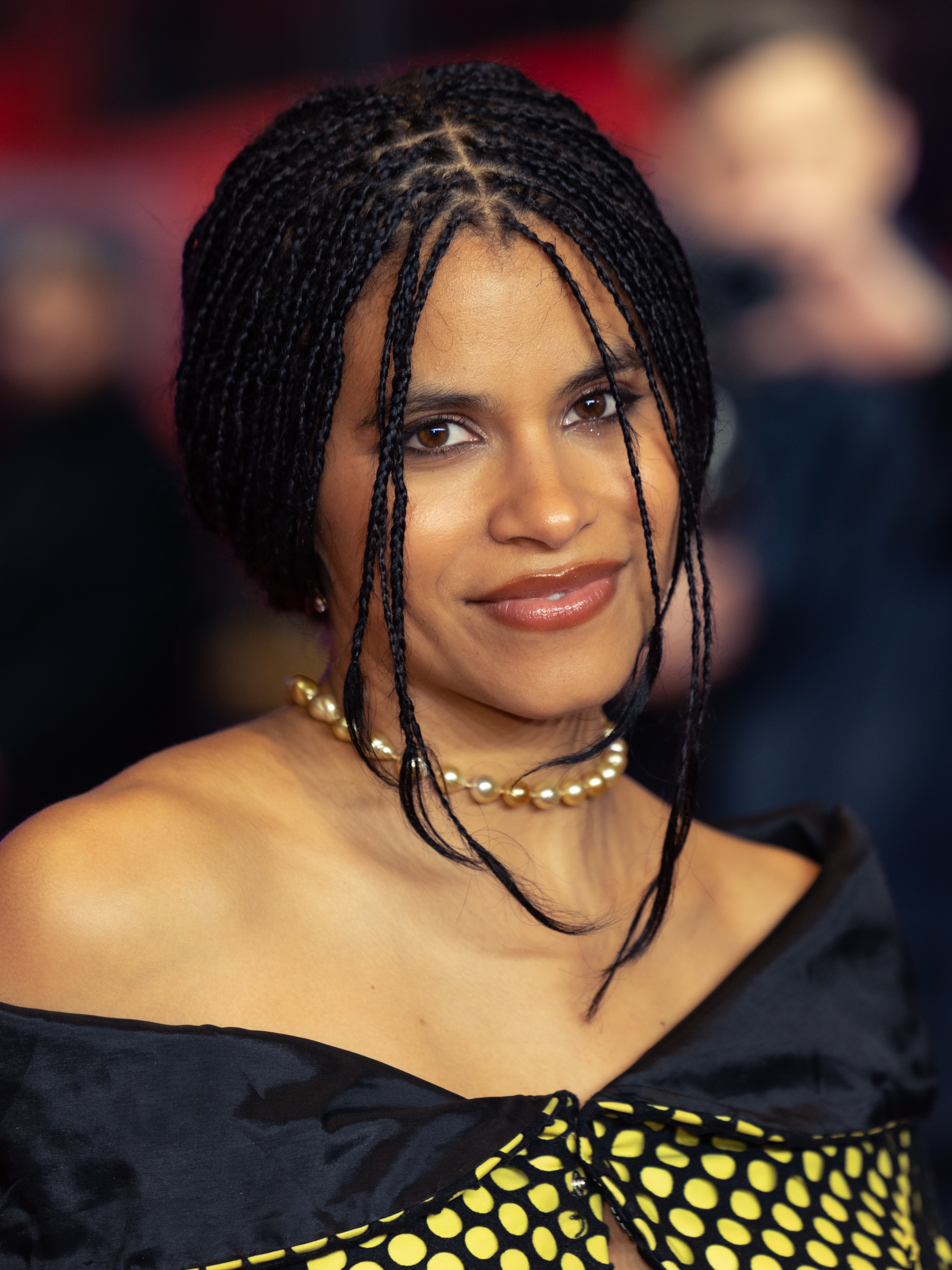
Zazie Beetz

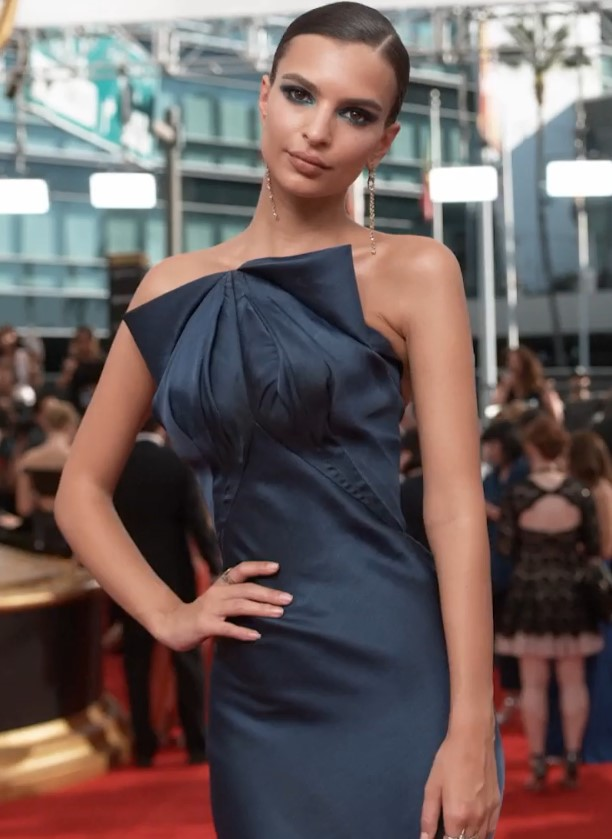
Emily Ratajkowski

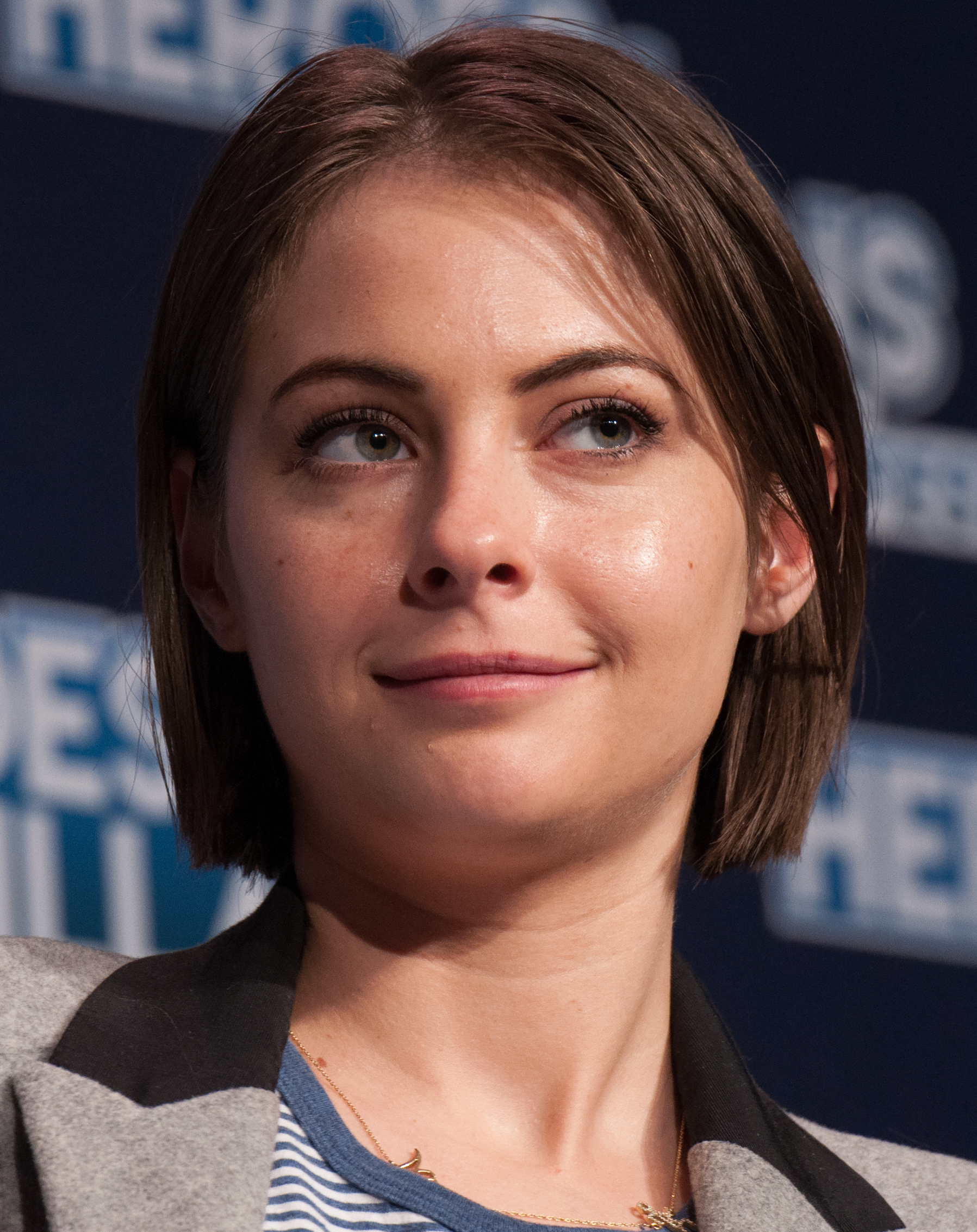
Willa Holland

- June 1 – Zazie Beetz, German-born actress
- June 3 – Pico Alexander, actor
- June 4
  - Jordan Danger, actress
  - Quincy, actor and singer
  - Sykkuno, streamer
- June 5 – Tyler Blevins, gamer
- June 7
  - Emily Ratajkowski, model and actress
  - Fetty Wap, rapper
- June 8 – Terrance Gore, baseball player (d. 2026)
- June 10 – Alexa Knierim, pair skater
- June 12 – Louisa Jacobson, model
- June 15 – Hasim Rahman Jr., boxer
- June 18 – Willa Holland, model and actress
- June 19 – Jake Heaps, football player
- June 20 – Alexis Haines, television personality and model
- June 21 – Tyler Childers, singer-songwriter
- June 23 – Katie Armiger, singer
- June 24
  - Dexter Darden, actor
  - Max Ehrich, actor
- June 25 – Jessika Carr, wrestler
- June 26 – Amanda Cerny, YouTuber
- June 27
  - Rayvon Owen, singer
  - Kyle Smaine, freestyle skier (d. 2023)
  - Madylin Sweeten, actress
- June 29
  - Kawhi Leonard, basketball player
  - Addison Timlin, actress

=== July ===
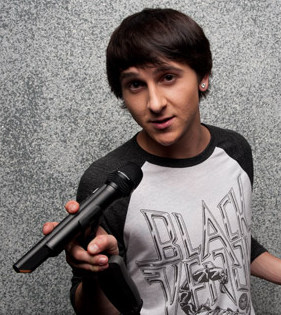
Mitchel Musso

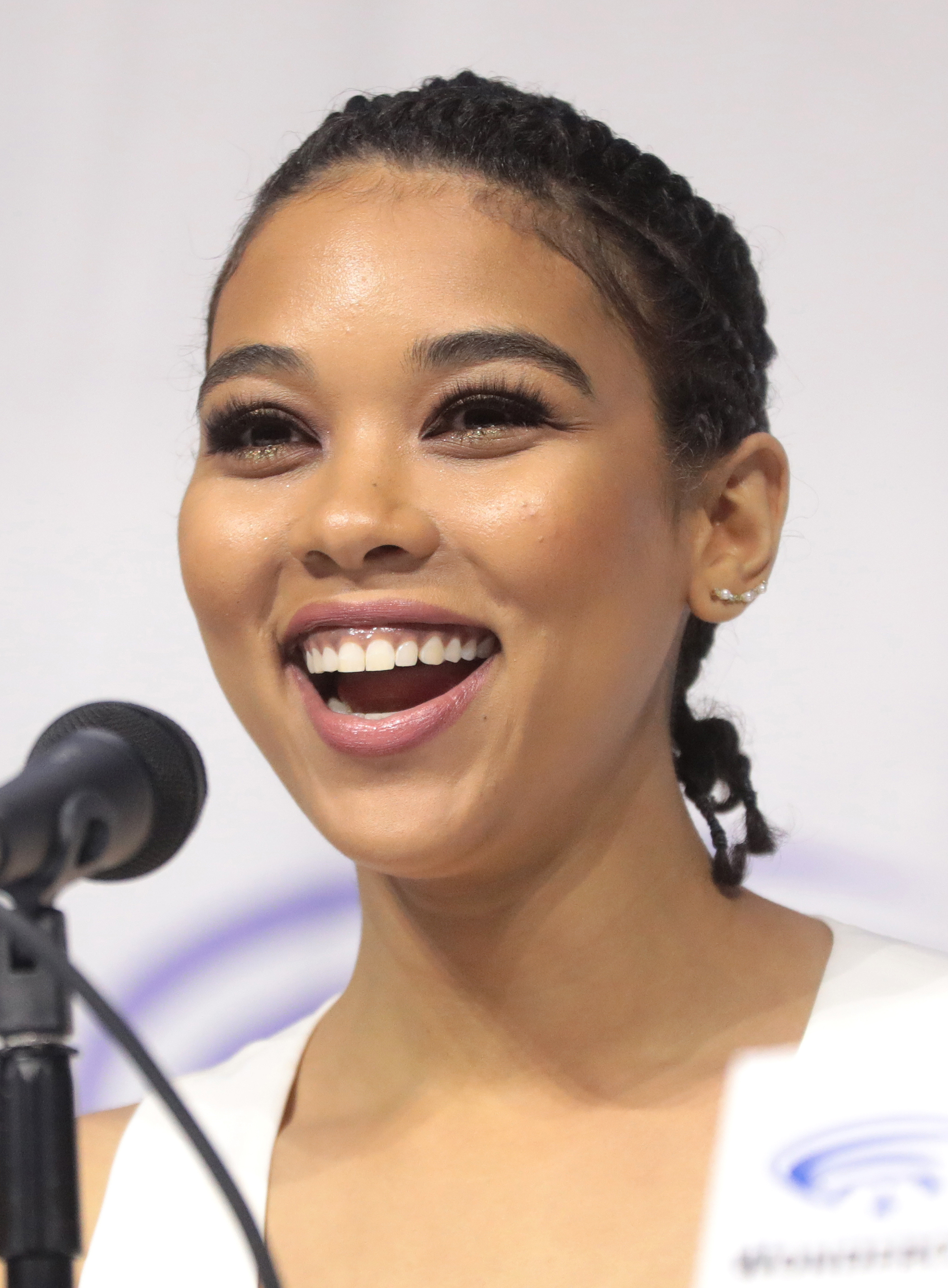
Alexandra Shipp

- July 1 – Michael Wacha, baseball player
- July 3
  - Cameron Brate, football player
  - Grant Rosenmeyer, actor
- July 5 – Jason Dolley, actor
- July 7 – Frank Del Duca, Olympic bobsledder
- July 9
  - Mitchel Musso, actor, musician and singer
  - Riley Reid, pornographic actress
- July 11 – Tom Shields, Olympic swimmer
- July 12
  - Erik Per Sullivan, actor
  - Dexter Roberts, singer
- July 14 – Diamante, wrestler
- July 15 – Derrick Favors, basketball player
- July 16
  - Nate Schmidt, ice hockey player
  - Alexandra Shipp, actress
- July 18 – Karina Pasian, singer and pianist
- July 20 – Alec Burks, basketball player
- July 24
  - Natalie 'Ninja' Duran, rock climber, television personality and fitness model
  - Elliot Rodger, mass murderer (d. 2014)
- July 25 – Hasan Piker, progressive YouTuber
- July 27 – Matt DiBenedetto, race car driver
- July 29 – Maestro Harrell, actor
- July 30 – Jason Richardson, guitarist for Born of Osiris and Chelsea Grin

=== August ===
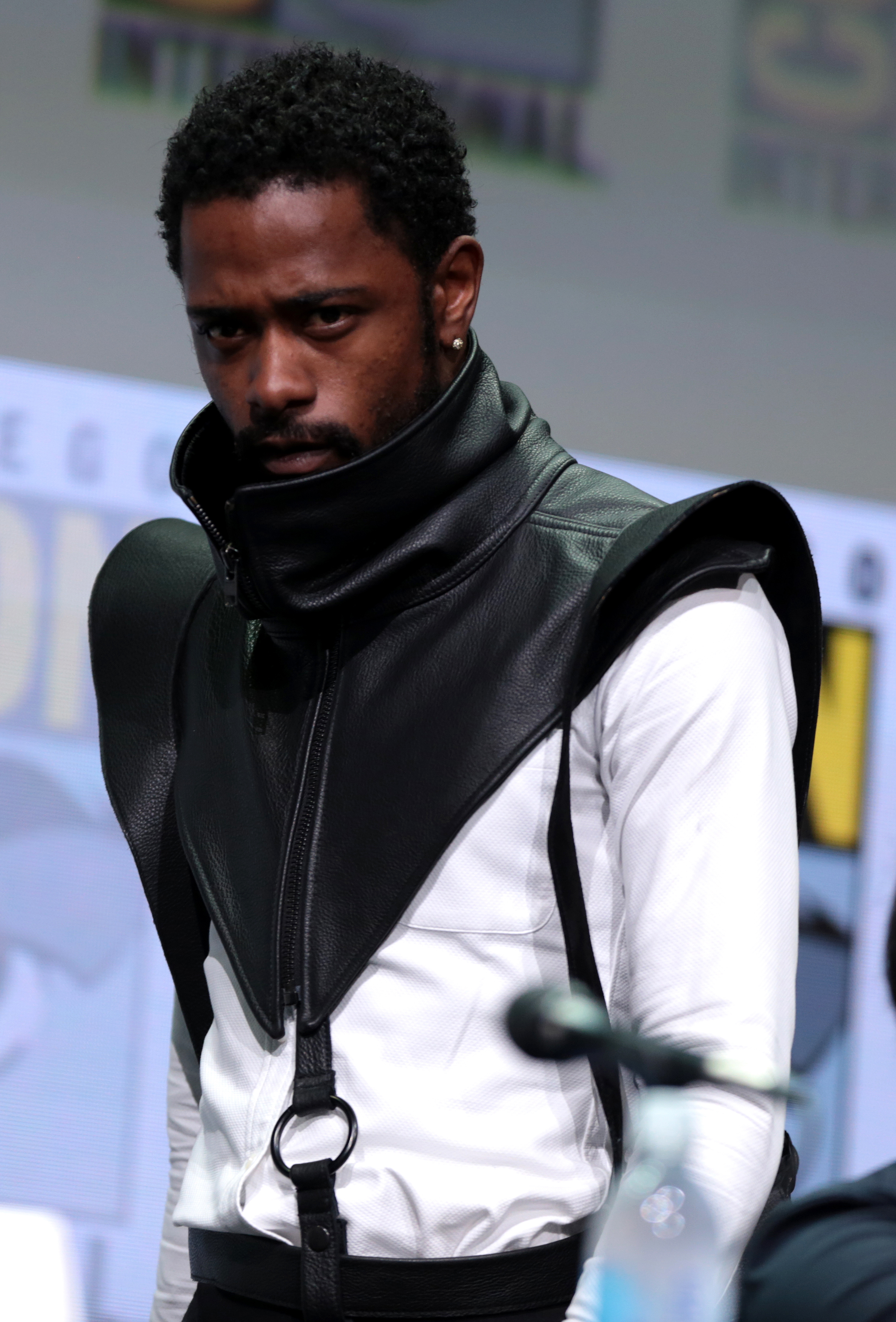
Lakeith Stanfield

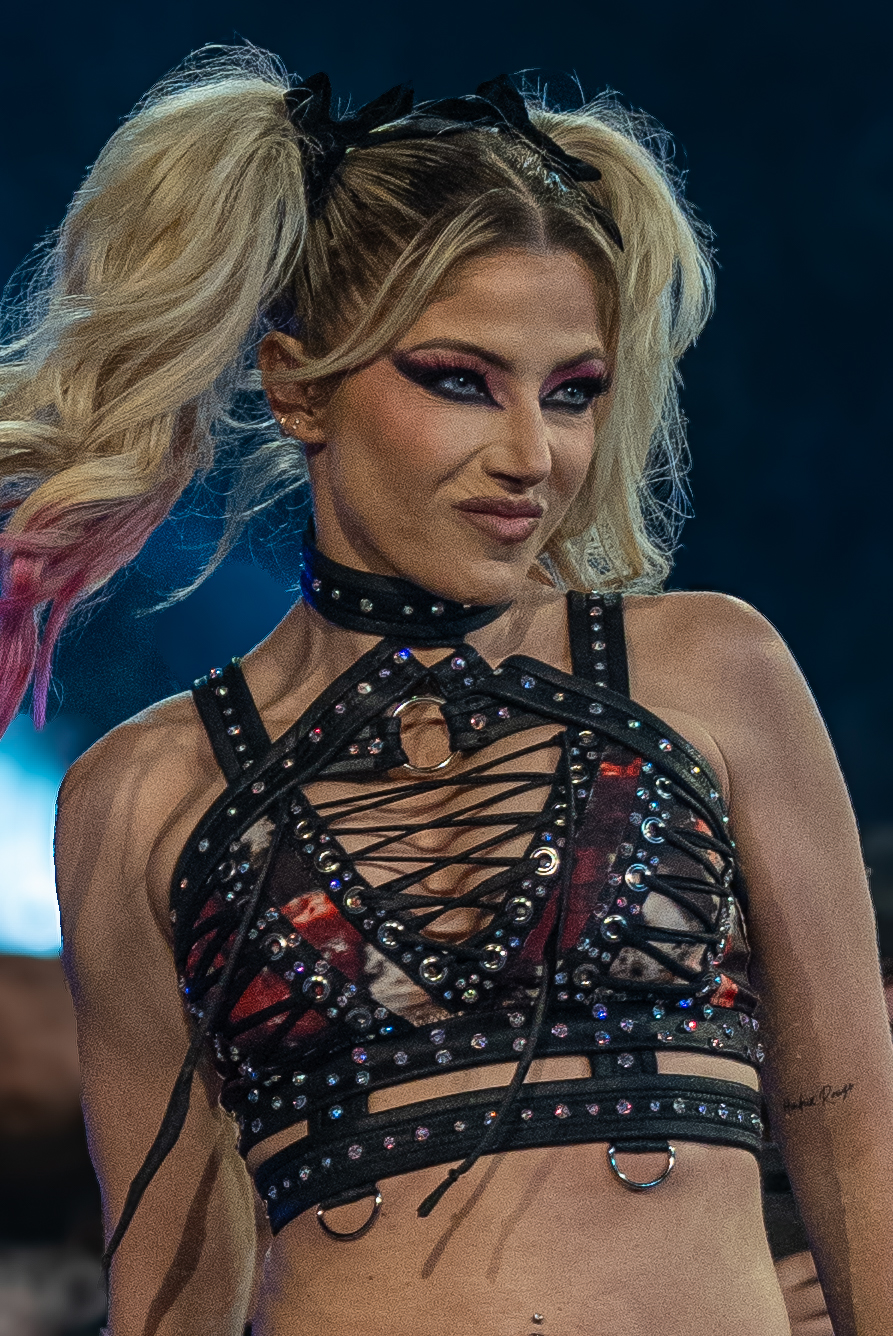
Alexa Bliss

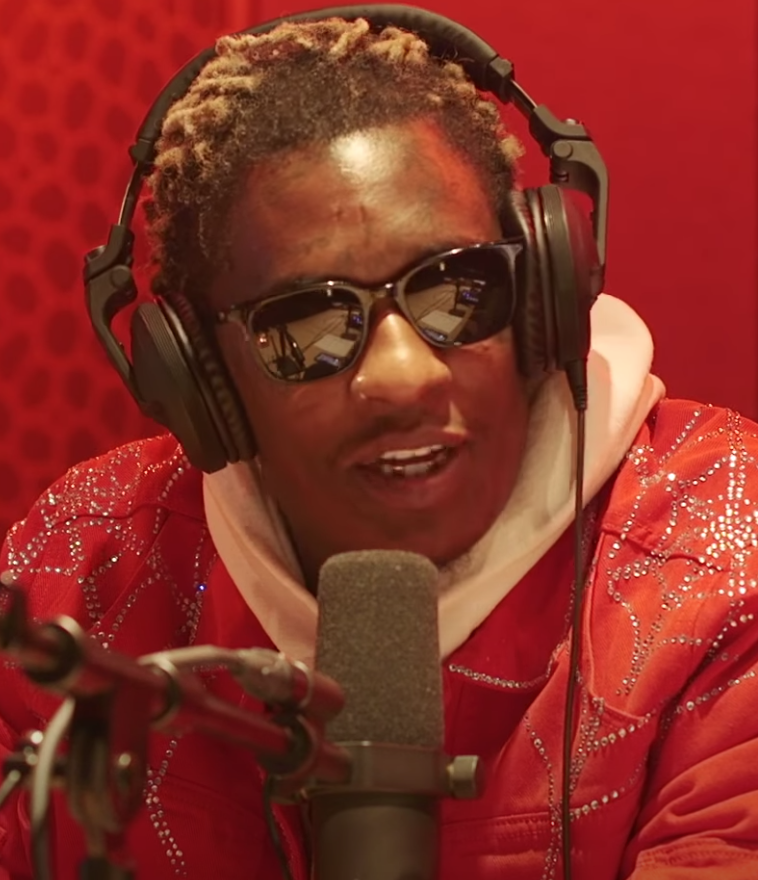
Young Thug

- August 2 – Skyler Day, actress and singer
- August 5
  - Brooke Marie Bridges, actress
  - John Reynolds, actor and writer
- August 7 – Mike Trout, baseball player
- August 9 – Alexa Bliss, wrestler
- August 10 – Maci Bookout, reality star
- August 12 – Lakeith Stanfield, actor
- August 15 – Jon Moscot, American-born Israeli baseball player
- August 16
  - Bia, rapper
  - Young Thug, hip hop artist
  - Hayley Chase, actress
- August 17 – Austin Butler, actor
- August 18 – Brianna Rollins-McNeal, Olympic track and field athlete
- August 19 – Alison Parker, news reporter (d. 2015)
- August 23 – Chris Hubbard, football player
- August 26
  - Ruby Aldridge, fashion model
  - Ryan Burroughs, rugby player
  - Jessie Diggins, Olympic cross-country skier
  - Dylan O'Brien, actor
- August 28
  - Kyle Massey, actor
  - Samuel Larsen, actor and singer

=== September ===
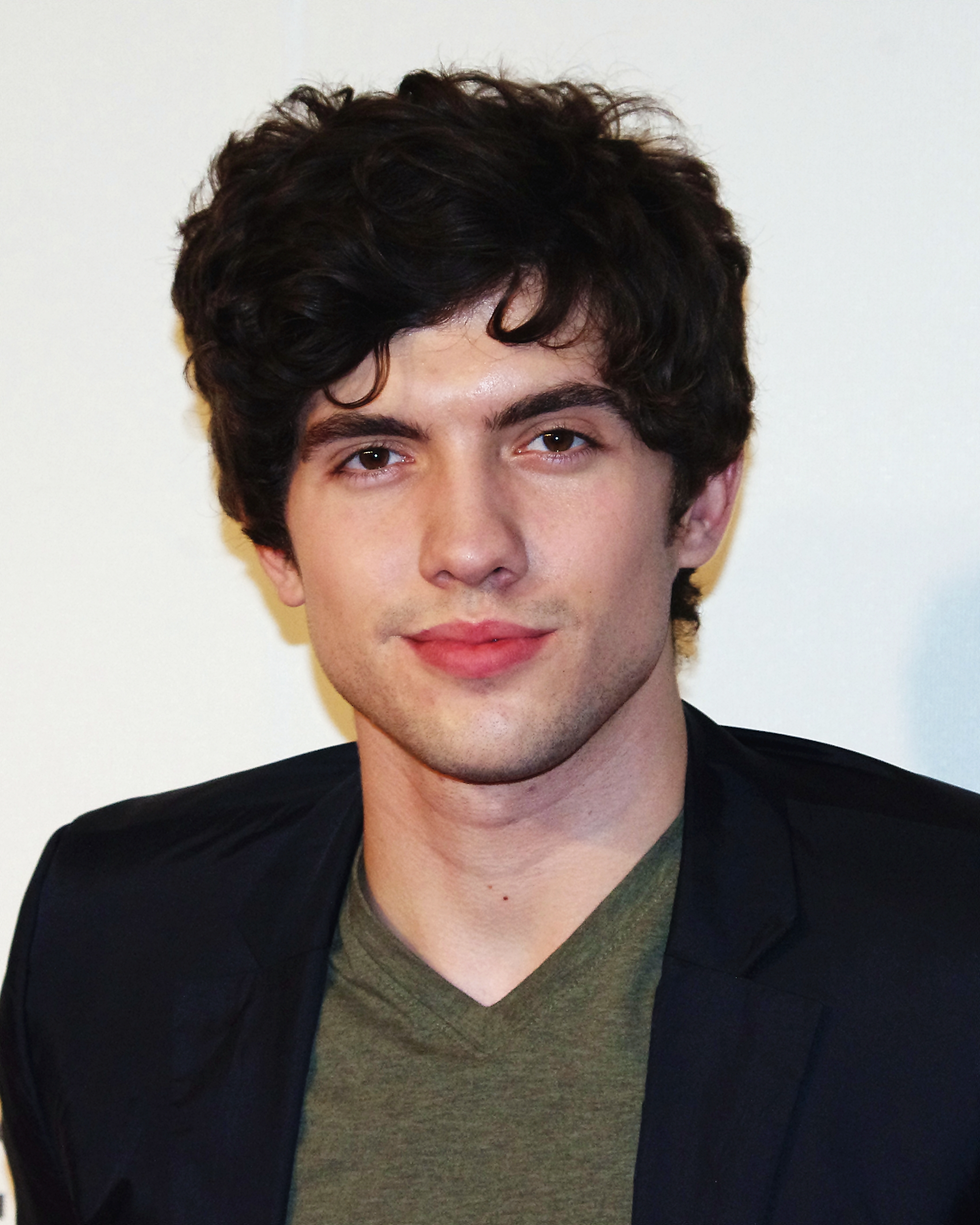
Carter Jenkins

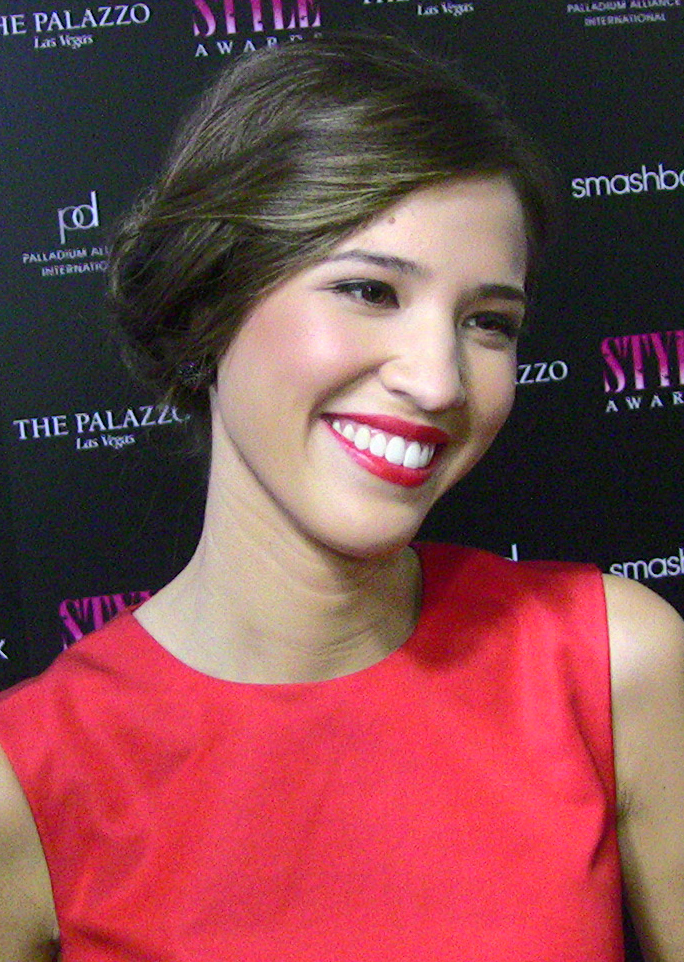
Kelsey Asbille

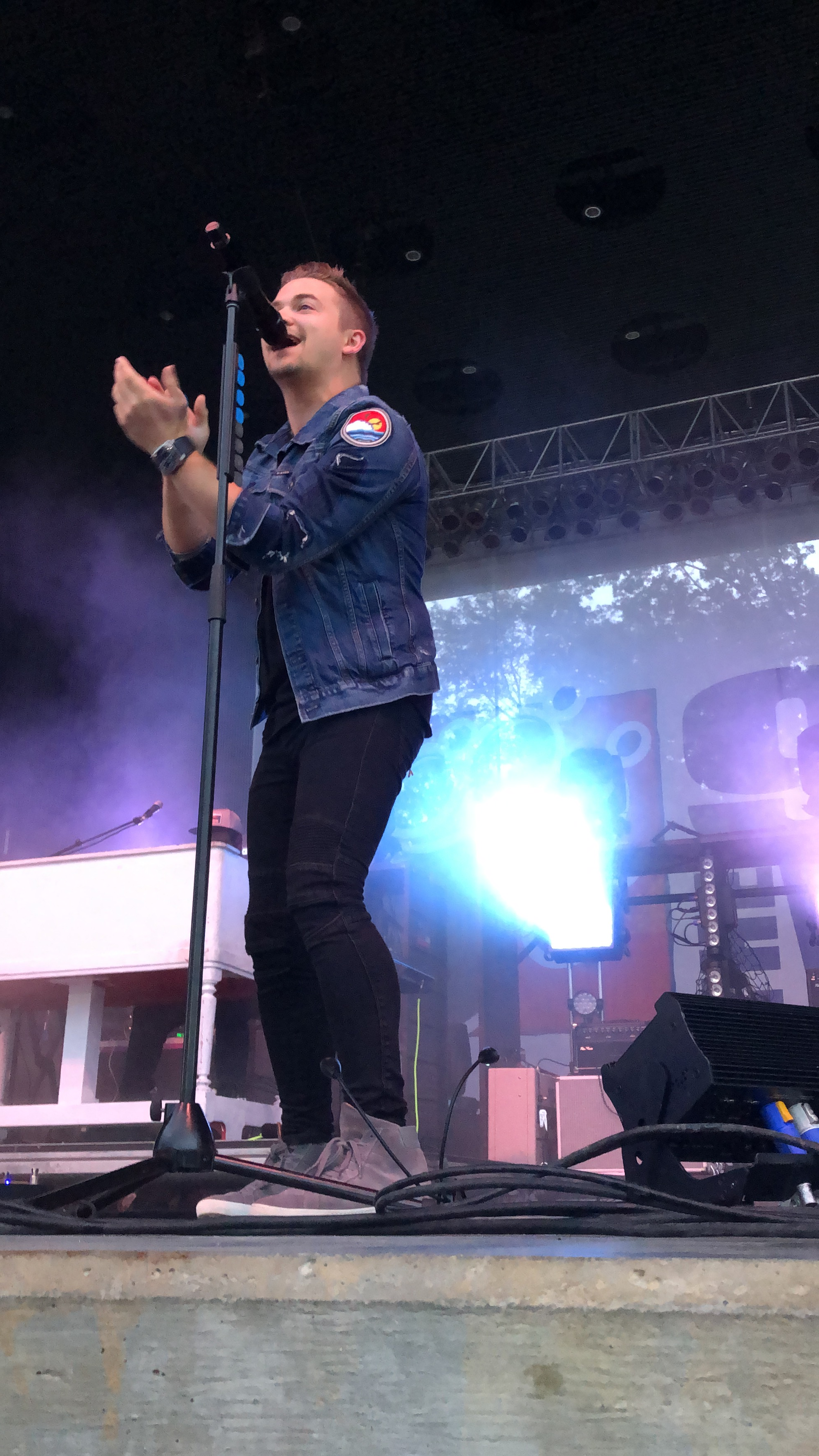
Hunter Hayes

- September 4 – Carter Jenkins, actor
- September 6
  - Tyler Austin, baseball player
  - Joe Harris, basketball player
- September 9
  - Kelsey Asbille, actress
  - Lauren Daigle, singer-songwriter
  - Hunter Hayes, singer-songwriter, record producer and multi-instrumentalist
- September 10 – Hannah Hodson, actress
- September 11 – Zach Holmes, stunt performer and television personality
- September 14
  - Ronnie Hillman, American football player (d. 2022)
  - Shayne Topp, actor and comedian
- September 15 – Mike Perry, martial artist
- September 17
  - Scott Hoying, a cappella singer and member of Pentatonix
  - Melanie Moore, dancer
- September 19
  - Keah Brown, activist
  - Tyler Neitzel, actor
- September 20 – Spencer Locke, actress
- September 22 – Chelsea Tavares, actress
- September 23 – Melanie Oudin, tennis player
- September 25
  - Emmy Clarke, actress
  - Alexander Rossi, race car driver
- September 27 – Thomas Mann, actor
- September 29 – Botham Jean, murder victim
- September 30
  - David Bakhtiari, football player
  - Mat Madiro, drummer

=== October ===
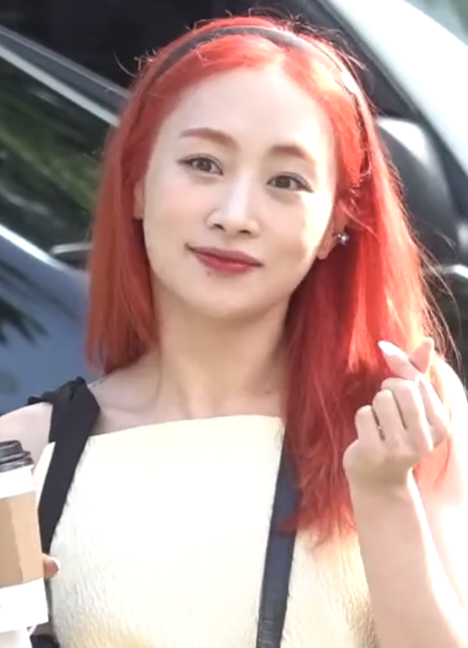
Nicole Jung

Toby Fox

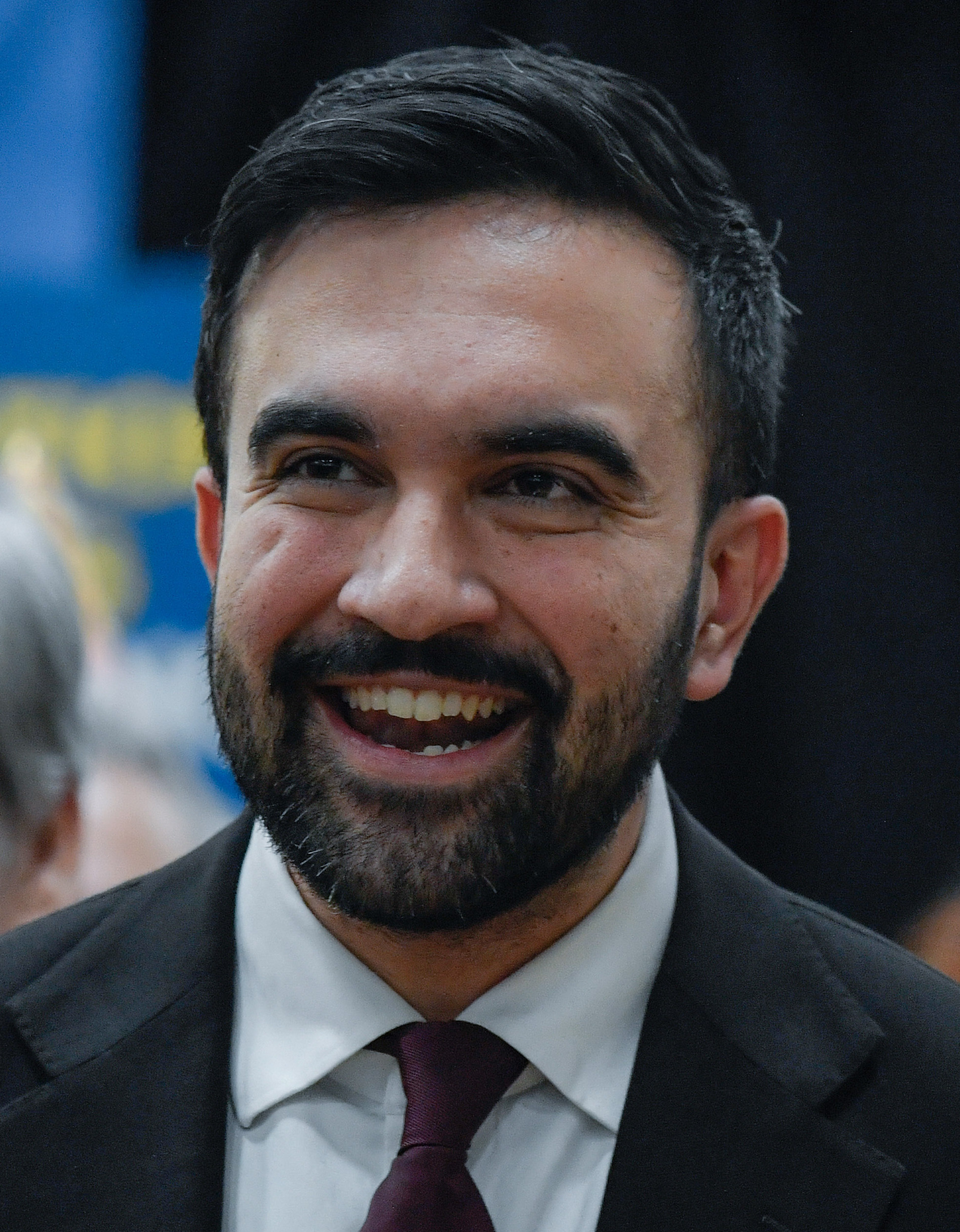
Zohran Mamdani

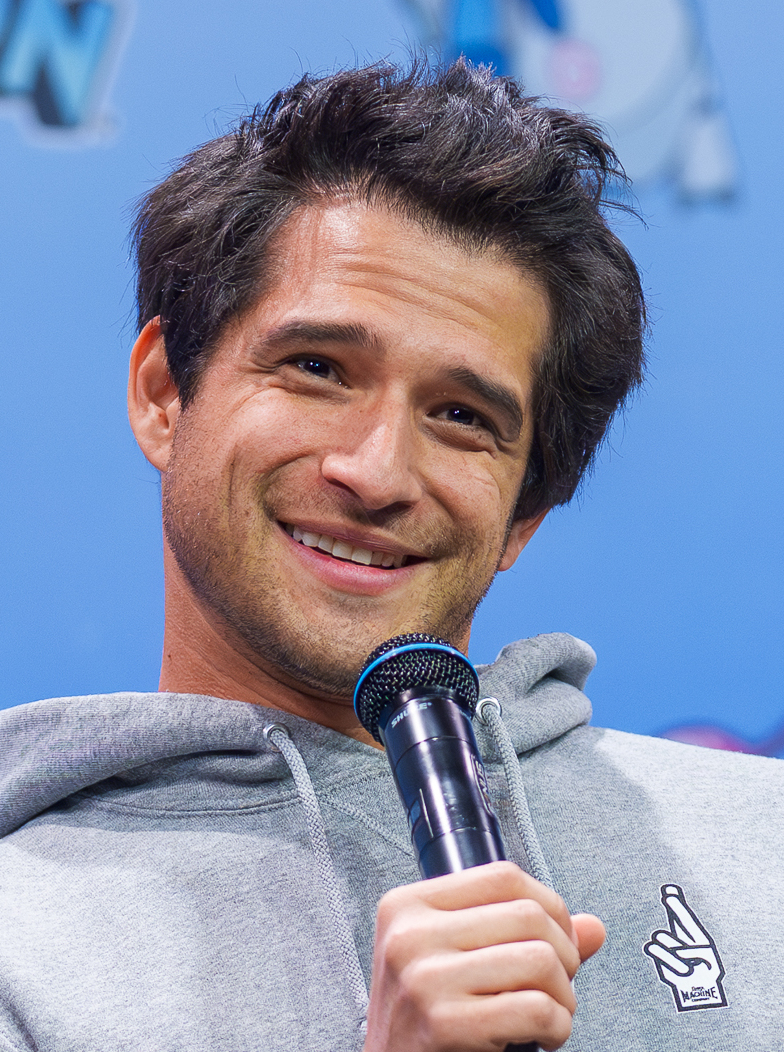
Tyler Posey

- October 1
  - Gus Kenworthy, British-born Olympic freestyle skier, actor and YouTuber
  - Sam Shankland, chess player
- October 4 – Cole Hawkins, actor
- October 6 – Roshon Fegan, actor
- October 7 – Nicole Jung, singer
- October 10 – Michael Carter-Williams, basketball player
- October 11 – Toby Fox, video game developer and composer
- October 15 – Brock Nelson, ice hockey player
- October 18
  - Zohran Mamdani, Ugandan-born politician, Mayor of New York City (2026-present)
  - Tyler Posey, actor and musician
- October 19
  - Colton Dixon, musician
  - Christopher Gerse, actor
- October 20 – Kirsten Olson, figure skater and actress
- October 23 – Sophie Oda, Japanese-American actress
- October 26 – Evan Gershkovich, journalist
- October 27 – Bryan Craig, actor
- October 29
  - Trey Burton, football player
  - Marcus Lattimore, football player
- October 31 – Kenny Hilliard, football player

=== November ===
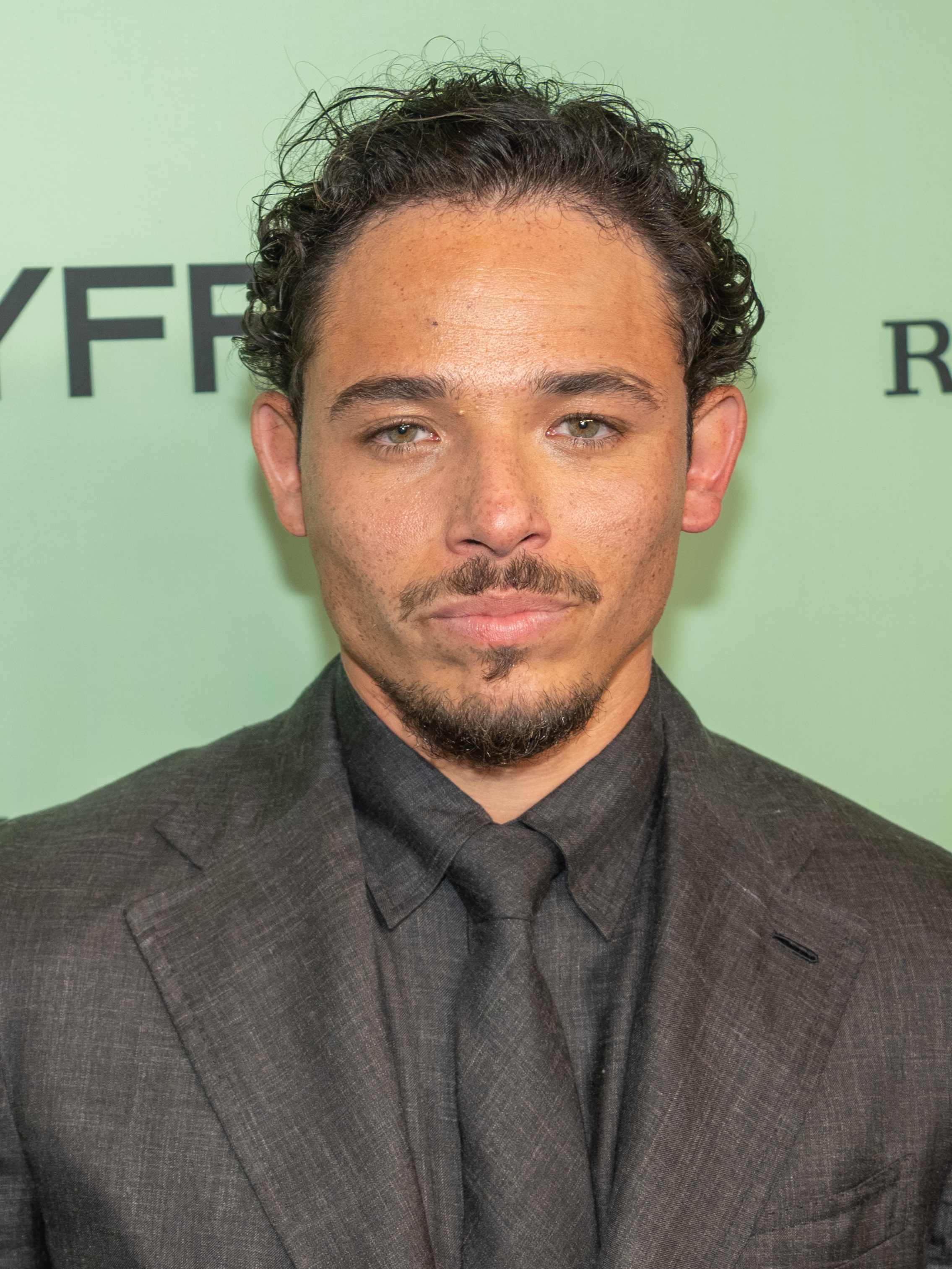
Anthony Ramos

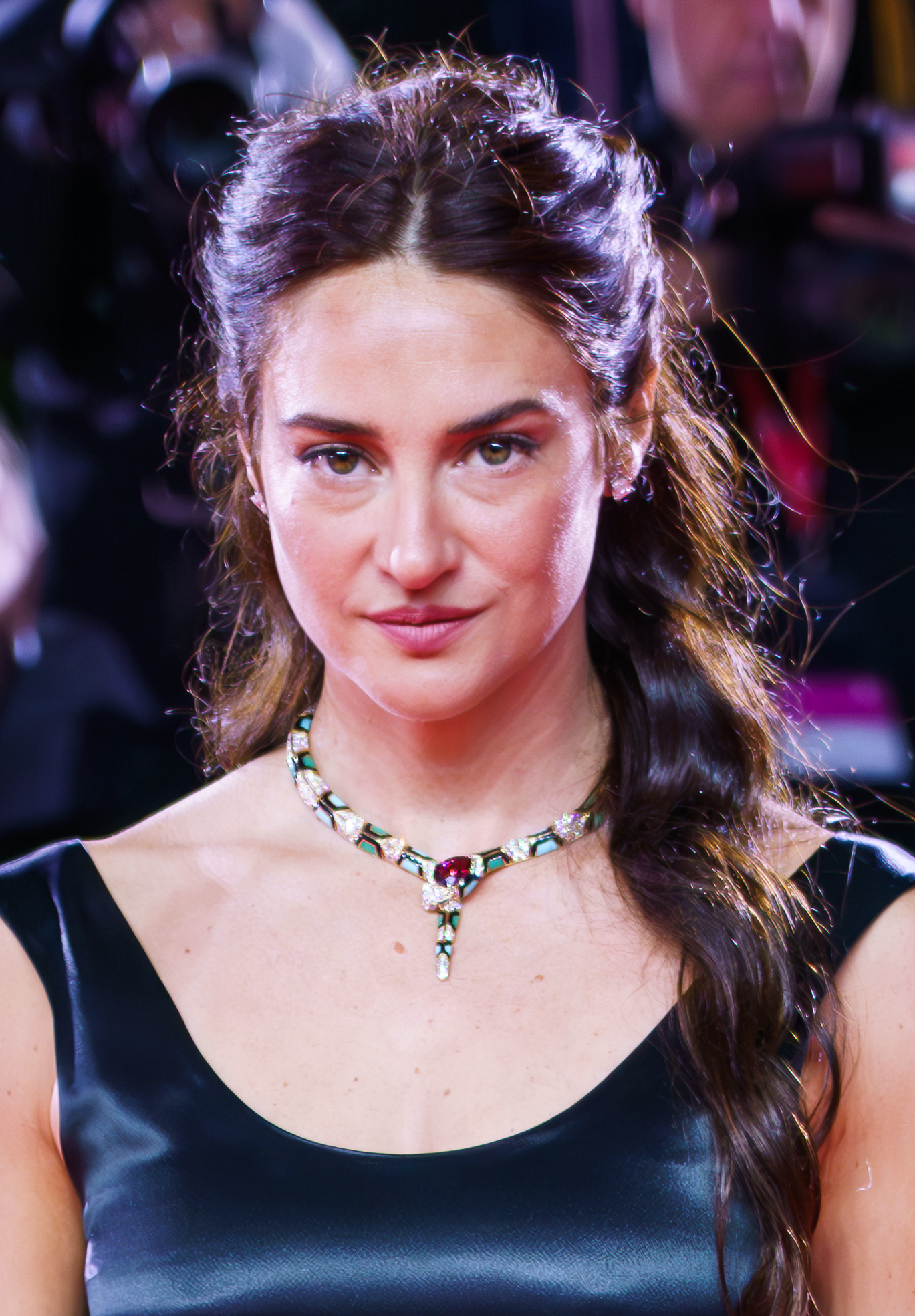
Shailene Woodley

- November 1 – Anthony Ramos, actor
- November 4
  - Bee Vang, actor
  - Adriana Chechik, pornographic actress
- November 5 – Dax Flame, actor and YouTuber
- November 6 – Pierson Fodé, actor and model
- November 8 – Riker Lynch, singer and actor
- November 11 – Christa B. Allen, actress
- November 13 – Matt Bennett, actor
- November 14
  - Beau Allen, football player
  - Graham Patrick Martin, film and television actor
- November 15 – Shailene Woodley, actress
- November 18 – Alex Rüdinger, drummer
- November 20 – Lily Ki, internet personality
- November 25
  - Kyler Fackrell, American football player
  - Jamie Grace, musician and actress
  - Kevin Woo, American-born South Korean singer and dancer

=== December ===
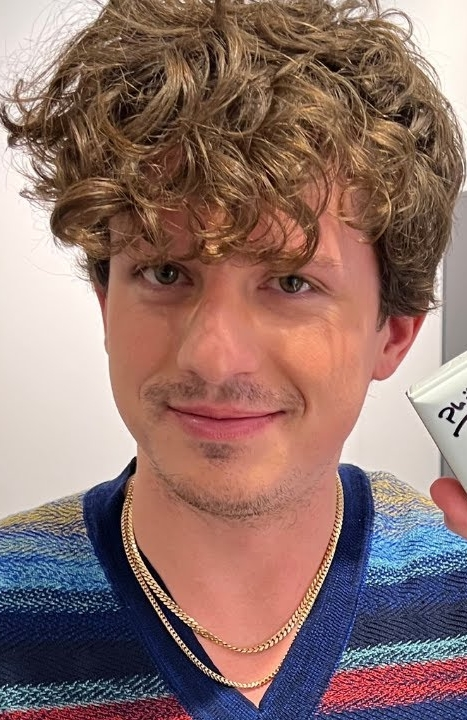
Charlie Puth

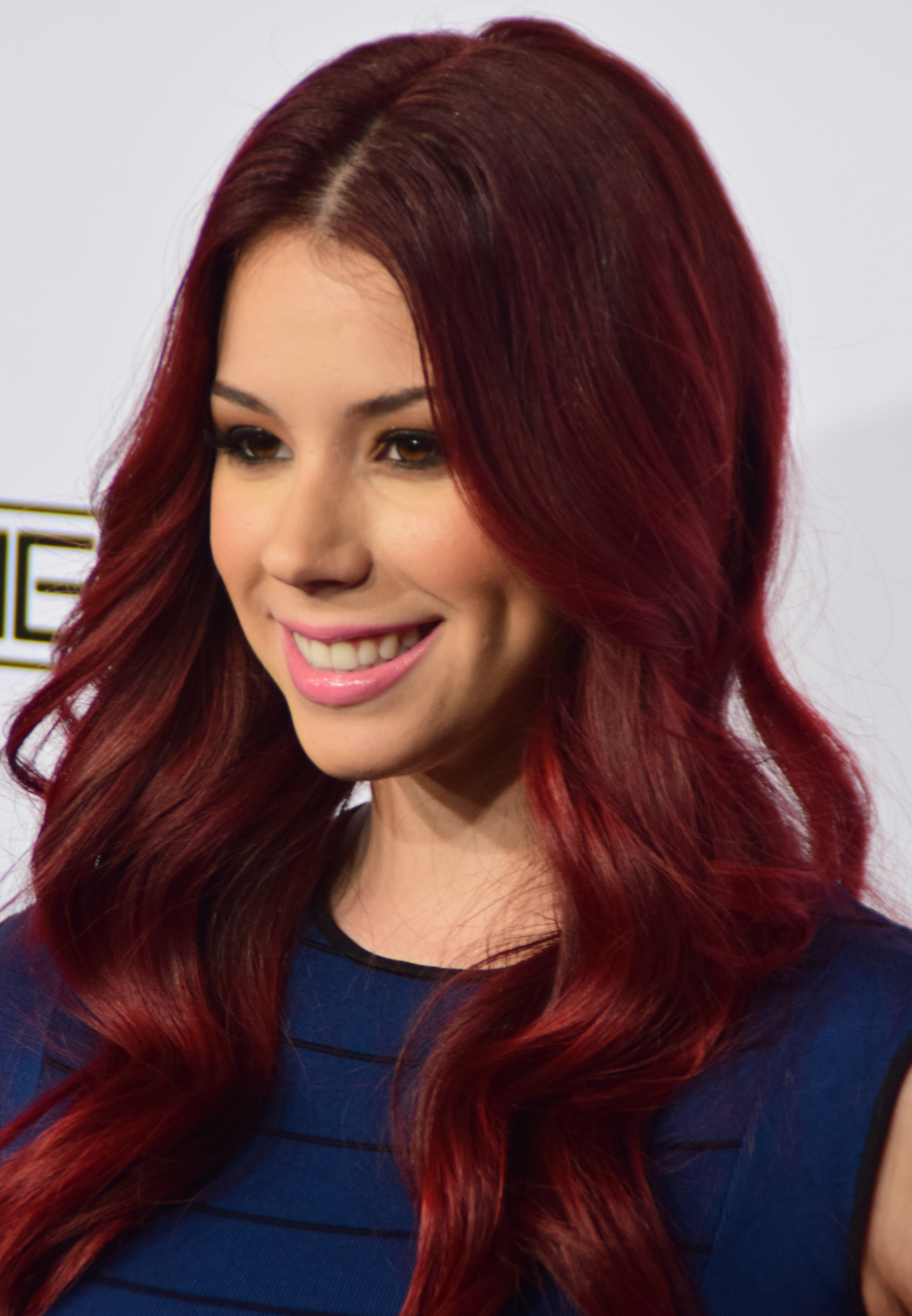
Jillian Rose Reed

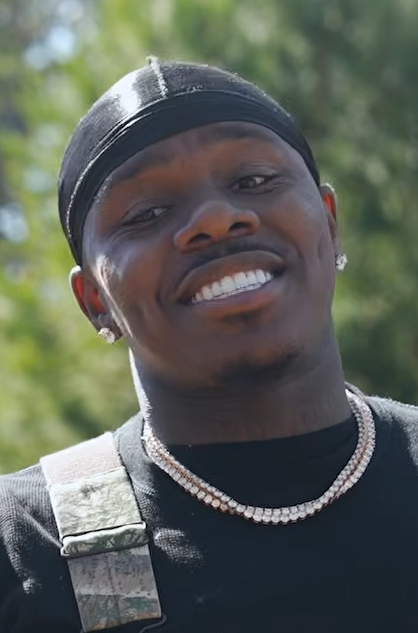
DaBaby

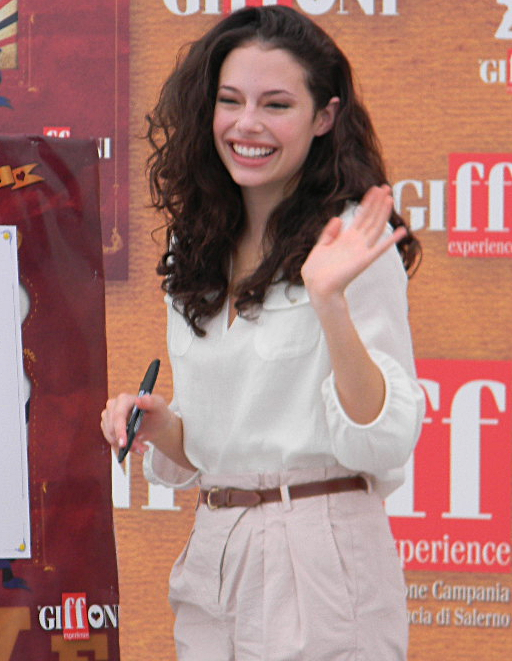
Chloe Bridges

- December 1
  - Noel Acciari, ice hockey player
  - Rakeem Christmas, basketball player
- December 2
  - Brandon Knight, basketball player
  - Charlie Puth, singer
- December 4
  - Hayley Arceneaux, youngest American in space and first astronaut with a prosthetic limb
  - Reality Winner, intelligence specialist convicted of espionage
- December 5 – Christian Yelich, baseball player
- December 6
  - Jeramey Anderson, politician
  - CoCo Vandeweghe, tennis player
- December 7 – Nick Perry, football player and coach
- December 9 – PnB Rock, rapper (d. 2022)
- December 10
  - Dion Waiters, basketball player
  - Eric Reid, American football player
- December 12
  - Jasmine Murray, singer
  - Wallis Currie-Wood, actress
- December 13 – Jay Greenberg, composer
- December 14 – Offset, rapper
- December 15
  - Eunice Cho, actress
  - Conor Daly, race car driver
  - Alana Haim, musician and actress
- December 18 – John Allen Chau, missionary (d. 2018)
- December 19
  - Libe Barer, actress
  - Tyler Clementi, bullying victim (d. 2010)
  - Edwin Jackson, football player (d. 2018)
- December 20
  - Hunter Gomez, actor
  - Jillian Rose Reed, actress
  - Colin Woodell, actor
- December 21 – Otis, wrestler
- December 22 – DaBaby, rapper
- December 24
  - Sofia Black-D'Elia, actress
  - Vincent Caso, actor and entrepreneur
  - Taylor Zakhar Perez, actor
- December 26
  - Jackson Jeffcoat, football player
  - Eden Sher, actress
- December 27 – Chloe Bridges, actress
- December 30 – Tyler Carter, musician, singer-songwriter and frontman for ISSUES (2012–2020) and Woe, Is Me (2009–2011)

=== Full date unknown ===
- Topher, rapper

== Deaths ==
=== January ===
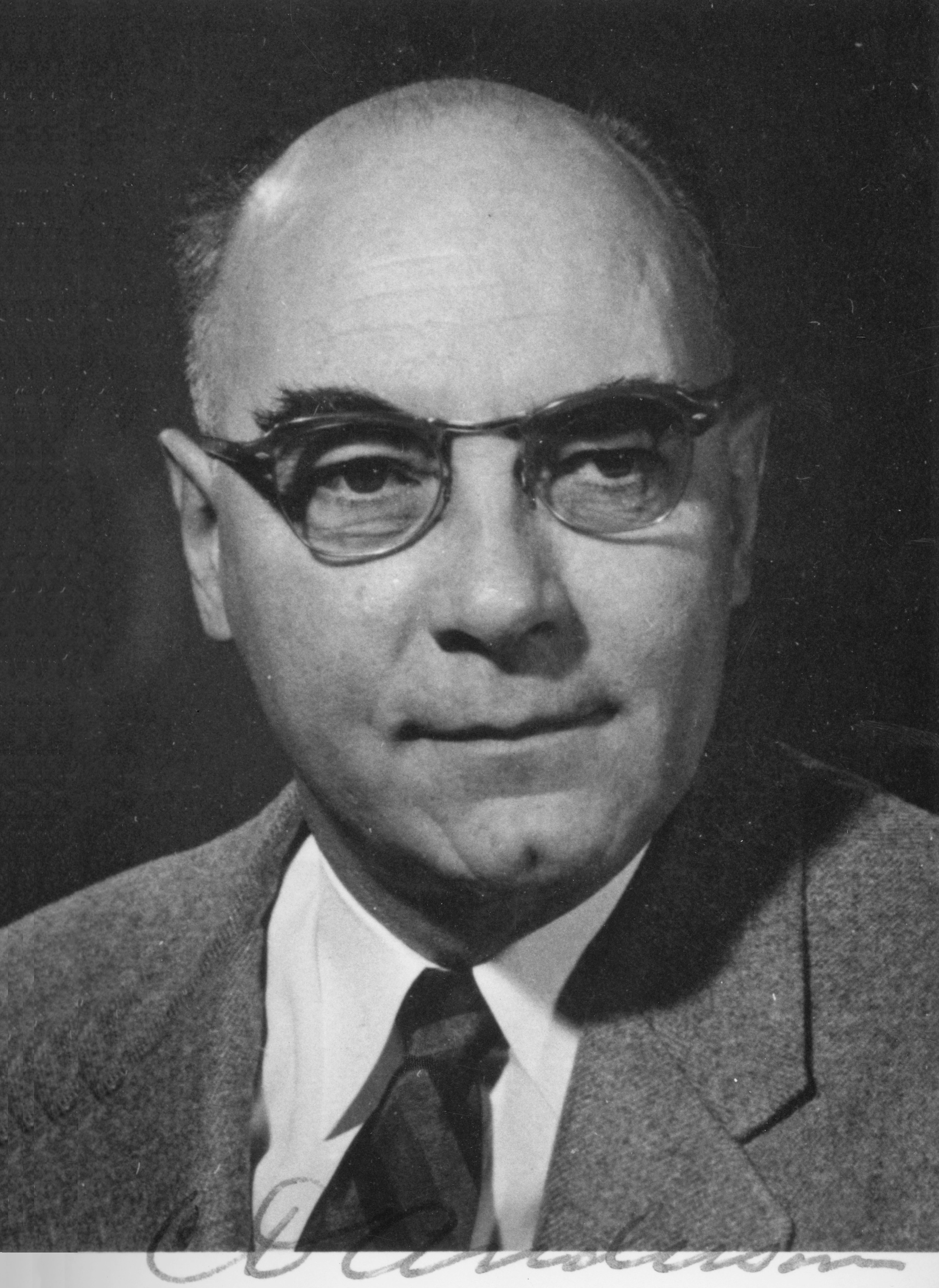
Carl David Anderson

- January 2 – Irving Johnson, American sailor and author (b. 1905)
- January 3 – Luke Appling, American baseball player (Chicago White Sox) and member of the MLB Hall of Fame (b. 1907)
- January 5 – Johnny Eck, American entertainer (b. 1911)
- January 6 – Alan Wiggins, American baseball player (b. 1958)
- January 7 – Everett Bidwell, American politician (b. 1899)
- January 11 – Carl David Anderson, American physicist (b. 1905)
- January 12 – Mary Francis Shura, American writer (b. 1923)
- January 18 – Hamilton Fish III, American soldier and politician (b. 1888)
- January 19 – John Russell, American actor (b. 1921)
- January 28 – Red Grange, American football player (b. 1903)
- January 29 – John McIntire, American actor (b. 1907)
- January 30
  - John Bardeen, American physicist (b. 1908)
  - Clifton C. Edom, American photojournalism educator (b. 1907)

=== February ===
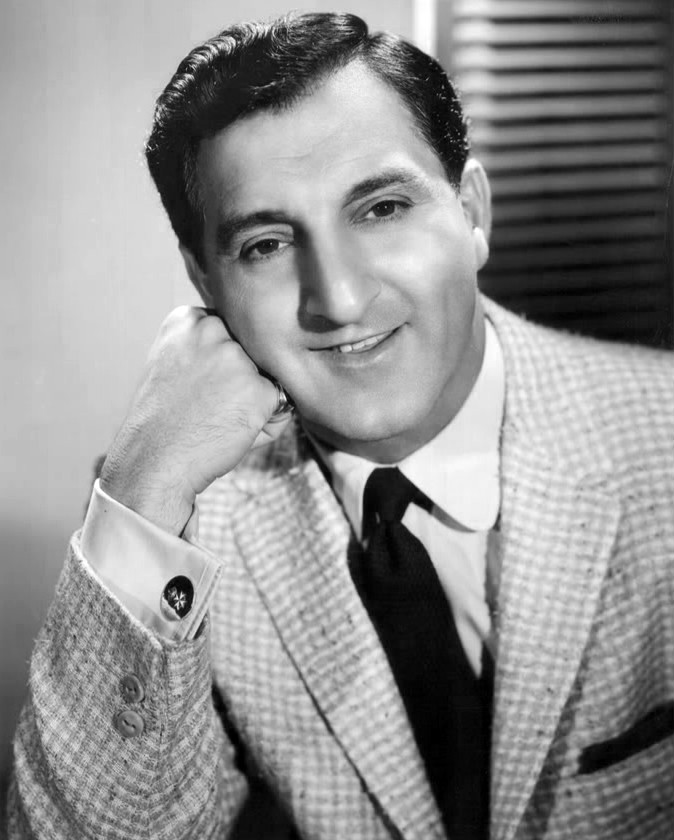
Danny Thomas

- February 1 – Carol Dempster, American actress (b. 1901)
- February 2 – Pete Axthelm, American sportswriter (b. 1943)
- February 3
  - Nancy Kulp, American actress (b. 1921)
  - Ed Russenholt, first US weather presenter (b. 1890)
- February 5 – Dean Jagger, American actor (b. 1903)
- February 6 – Danny Thomas, American singer, comedian and actor (b. 1912)
- February 9 – James Cleveland, American gospel singer (b. 1931)
- February 10 – Bernard Lee, American civil rights activist (b. 1935)
- February 14
  - John A. McCone, American politician (b. 1902)
  - Neta Snook, American aviator (b. 1896)
- February 15 – Arturo Islas, American professor and novelist (b. 1938)
- February 21 – John Sherman Cooper, American politician (b. 1901)
- February 24
  - George Gobel, American comedian (b. 1919)
  - Webb Pierce, American musician (b. 1921)
  - Jean Rogers, American actress (b. 1916)

=== March ===
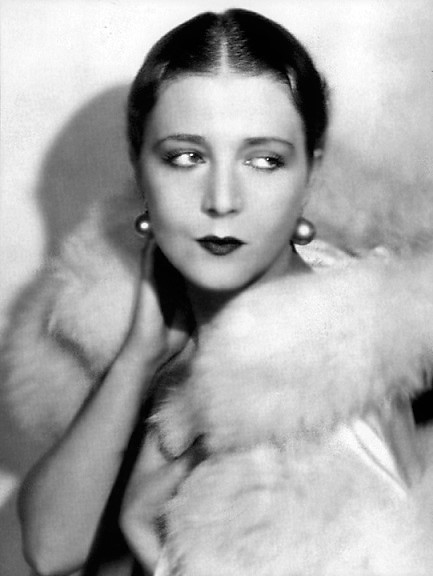
Vilma Bánky

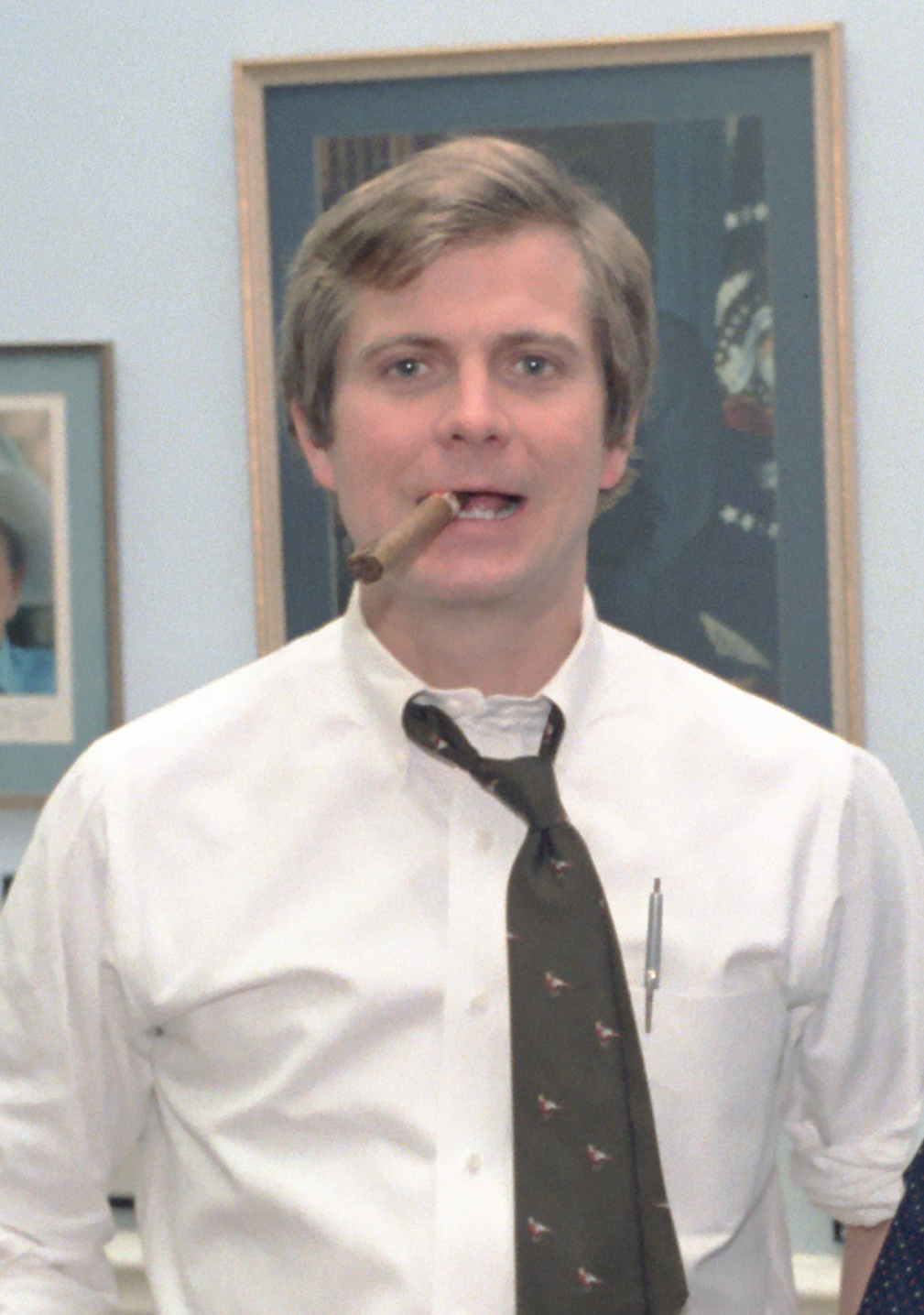
Lee Atwater

- March 1 – Edwin H. Land, American scientist and inventor (b. 1909)
- March 3 – Arthur Murray, American dancer and dance instructor (b. 1895)
- March 7 – Cool Papa Bell, American baseball player (b. 1903)
- March 14
  - Howard Ashman, American lyricist (b. 1950)
  - Doc Pomus, American composer (b. 1925)
- March 15 – George Sherman, American film director (b. 1908)
- March 16 – Latasha Harlins, American teenage homicide victim (b. 1976)
- March 18 – Vilma Bánky, Hungarian-born actress (b. 1901)
- March 21
  - Nan Britton, American secretary, mistress of Warren G. Harding (b. 1896)
  - Leo Fender, American instrument maker (b. 1909)
- March 23 – Margaret Atwood Judson, historian and author (b. 1899)
- March 27 – Aldo Ray, American actor (b. 1926)
- March 29 – Lee Atwater, American political consultant and strategist (b. 1951)

=== April ===
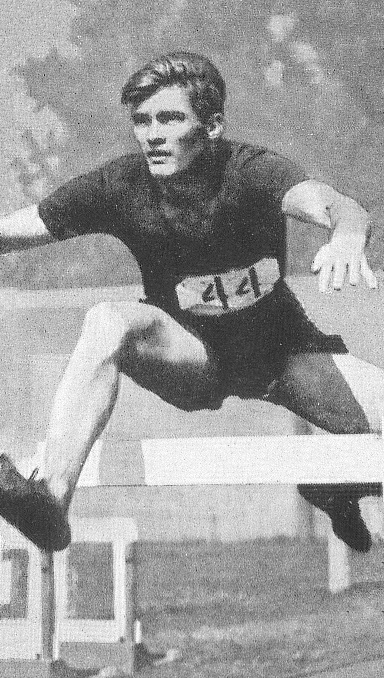
Forrest Towns

- April 1 – Martha Graham, American dancer and choreographer (b. 1894)
- April 3 – Charles Goren, American bridge player, writer and columnist (b. 1901)
- April 4 – John Heinz, American politician (b. 1938)
- April 5
  - Sonny Carter, American astronaut (b. 1947)
  - John Tower, American politician (b. 1925)
- April 7 – Ruth Page, American ballerina and choreographer (b. 1899)
- April 9 – Forrest Towns, American Olympic athlete (b. 1914)
- April 10
  - Kevin Peter Hall, American actor (b. 1955)
  - Natalie Schafer, American actress (b. 1900)
- April 11 – Dick Manning, Russian-born American songwriter (b. 1912)
- April 20 – Don Siegel, American film director (b. 1912)
- April 23 – Johnny Thunders, American musician (b. 1952)
- April 26
  - Carmine Coppola, American composer and conductor (b. 1910)
  - Emily McLaughlin, American actress (b. 1928)
  - William Andrew Paton, founder of the American Accounting Association in 1916, (b. 1889)
- April 28
  - Ken Curtis, American actor and singer (b. 1916)
  - Paul E. Klopsteg, American physicist (b. 1889)
  - Floyd McKissick, American lawyer and civil rights activist (b. 1922)
  - Lee Wulff, American conservationist and fisherman (b. 1905)

=== May ===
- May 1 – Richard Thorpe, American film director (b. 1896)
- May 3 – Jerzy Kosiński, Polish-American writer (b. 1933)
- May 4 – Dennis Crosby, American singer and actor (b. 1934)
- May 6 – Wilfrid Hyde-White, British actor (b. 1903)
- May 22 – Derrick Henry Lehmer, American mathematician (b. 1905)
- May 24 – Gene Clark, American singer-songwriter (b. 1944)
- May 26 – Tom Eyen, American writer and director (b. 1940)
- May 27 – Konerak Sinthasomphone, One of Jeffrey Dahmer's Victim (b. 1976)
- May 29 – Coral Browne, Australian actress (b. 1913)

=== June ===
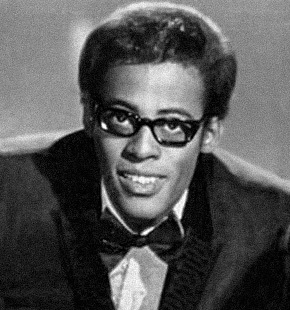
David Ruffin

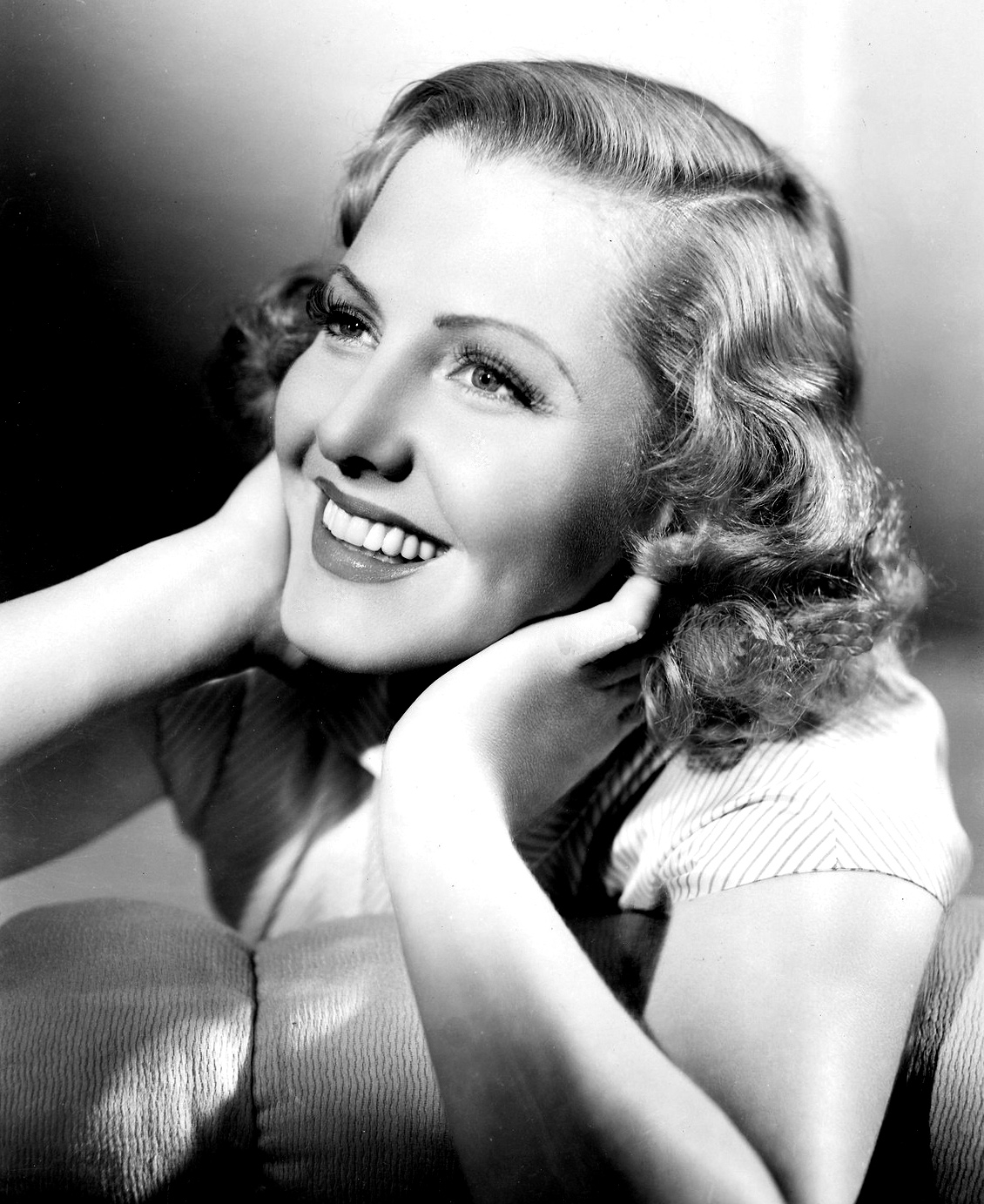
Jean Arthur

- June 1 – David Ruffin, American singer (b. 1941)
- June 3
  - Eva Le Gallienne, English-born actress (b. 1899)
  - Andy Milligan, American playwright, actor and filmmaker (b. 1929)
- June 4 – MC Trouble, American rapper (b. 1970)
- June 5
  - Evelyn Boucher, British silent film actress (b. 1892)
  - Min Chueh Chang, Chinese-born American reproductive biologist (b. 1908)
  - Larry Kert, American actor (b. 1930)
  - Sylvia Porter, American economist and journalist (b. 1913)
- June 6 – Stan Getz, American jazz saxophonist (b. 1927)
- June 8 – Bertice Reading, American actress and singer (b. 1933)
- June 9 – Claudio Arrau, Chilean-born pianist (b. 1903)
- June 15 – Happy Chandler, governor of Kentucky and commissioner of Major League Baseball (b. 1898)
- June 18
  - Vivion Brewer, American desegregationist (b. 1900)
  - Joan Caulfield, American actress (b. 1922)
- June 19 – Jean Arthur, American actress (b. 1900)
- June 25 – Michael Heidelberger, American immunologist (b. 1888)

=== July ===
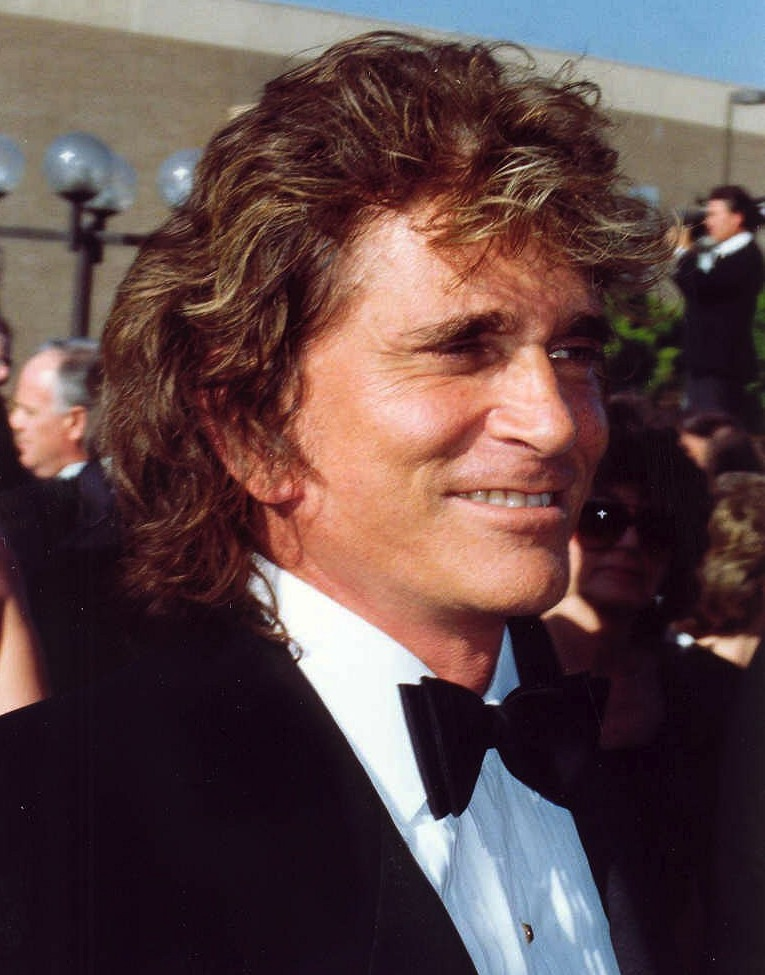
Michael Landon

- July 1 – Michael Landon, American actor (b. 1936)
- July 2 – Lee Remick, American actress (b. 1935)
- July 4 – Henry Koerner, Austrian-born American painter and graphic designer (b. 1915)
- July 5
  - Mildred Dunnock, American actress (b. 1901)
  - Howard Nemerov, American poet (b. 1920)
- July 8 – James Franciscus, American actor (b. 1934)
- July 15
  - Bert Convy, American actor, singer, game show host and television personality (b. 1933)
  - Roger Revelle, American scientist and scholar (b. 1909)
- July 16 – Robert Motherwell, American painter (b. 1915)
- July 17 – Arthur Raymond Brooks, American World War I fighter ace (b. 1895)
- July 20 – Joe Martinelli, American soccer player (b. 1916)
- July 21 – Theodore Wilson, American actor (b. 1943)

=== August ===
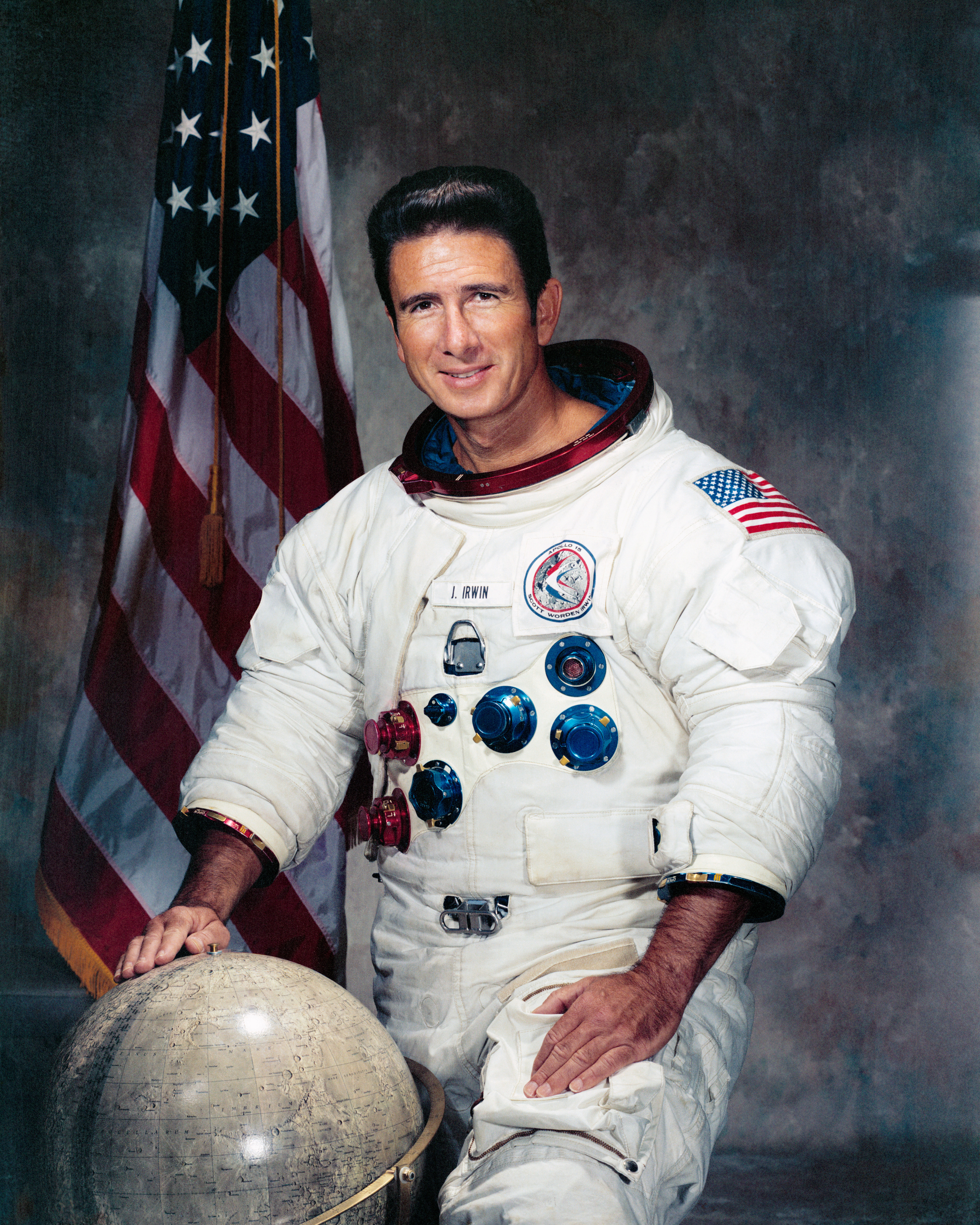
James Irwin

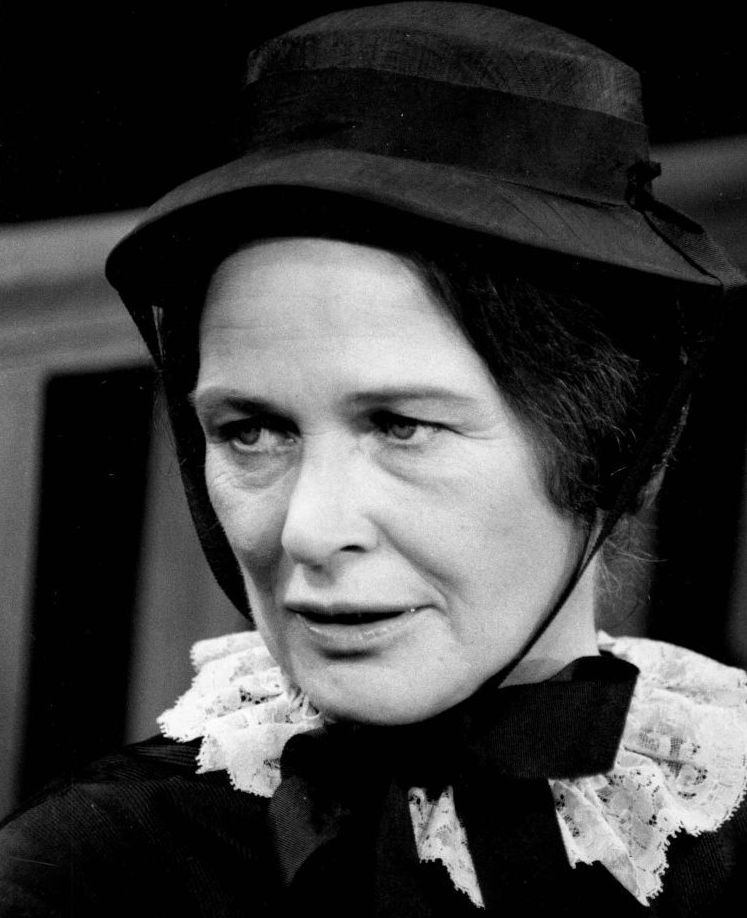
Colleen Dewhurst

- August 1 – Chris Short, American baseball pitcher (b. 1937)
- August 5
  - Paul Brown, American football coach (b. 1908)
  - Murray Golden, American television director (b. 1912)
  - Sam Goodman, American gospel singer (b. 1931)
- August 6 – Harry Reasoner, American journalist and newscaster (b. 1923)
- August 8
  - Julissa Gomez, American gymnast (b. 1972)
  - James Irwin, American astronaut (b. 1930)
- August 11 – J.D. McDuffie, American NASCAR driver (b. 1938)
- August 13
  - James Roosevelt, American businessman and politician (b. 1907)
  - Richard A. Snelling, American politician (b. 1927)
- August 22
  - Colleen Dewhurst, Canadian-born American actress (b. 1924)
  - Jane Stafford, American medical writer and chemist (b. 1899)
- August 23
  - Florence B. Seibert, American biochemist (b. 1897)
  - Mildred Trotter, American forensic anthropologist (b. 1899)
- August 25 – Niven Busch, American novelist and screenwriter (b. 1903)

=== September ===
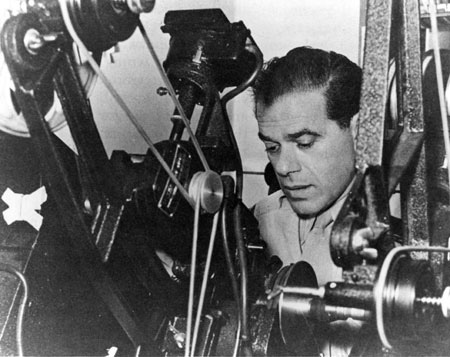
Frank Capra

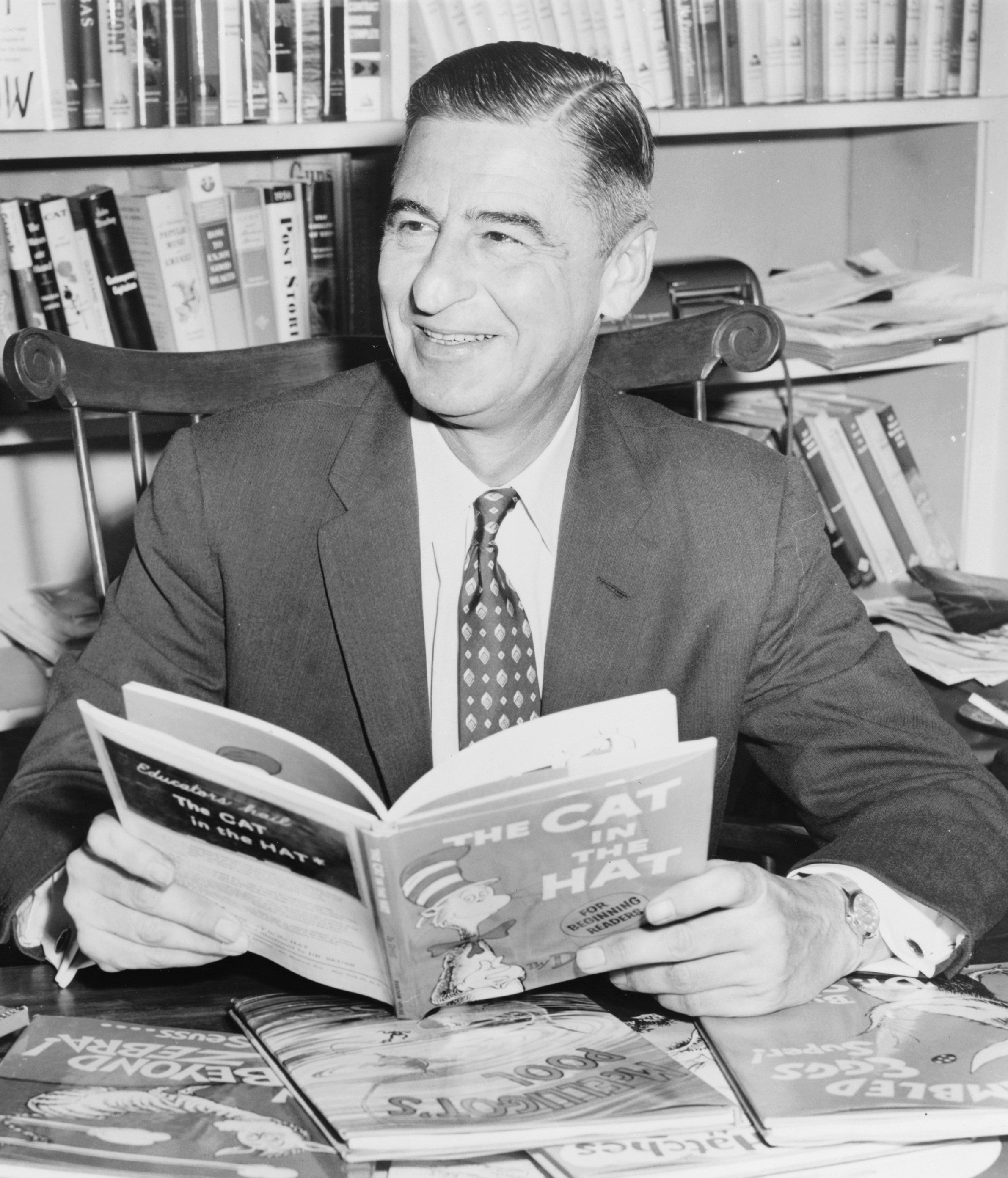
Dr. Seuss

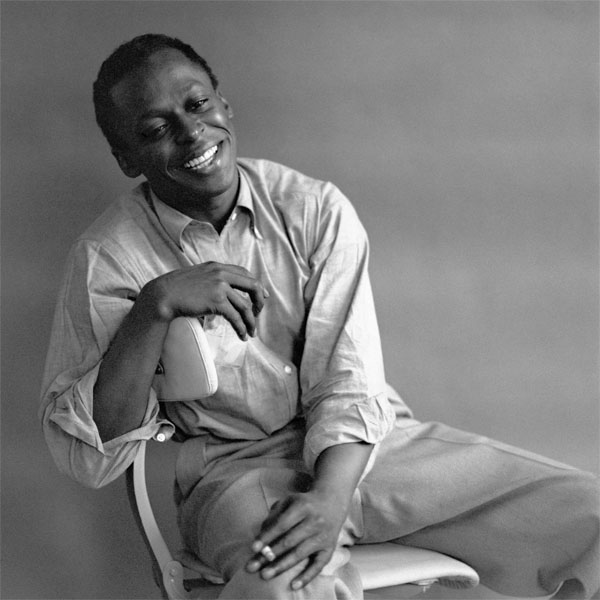
Miles Davis

- September 3 – Frank Capra, Italian-born American film director (b. 1897)
- September 4
  - Charlie Barnet, American jazz saxophonist (b. 1913)
  - Tom Tryon, American actor and writer (b. 1926)
  - Dottie West, American singer (b. 1932)
- September 6 – Donald Henry Gaskins, American serial killer (b. 1933)
- September 7 – Edwin McMillan, American chemist (b. 1917)
- September 8
  - Brad Davis, American actor (b. 1949)
  - Alex North, American film composer (b. 1910)
  - Nell Donnelly Reed, American fashion designer and businesswoman (b. 1889)
- September 12 – Chris Von Erich, American professional wrestler (b. 1969)
- September 13 – Joe Pasternak, Hungarian-born film director (b. 1901)
- September 14
  - Russell Lynes, American art historian, photographer and author (b. 1910)
  - Lisa Michelson, American voice actress (b. 1958)
- September 15 – John Hoyt, American actor (b. 1905)
- September 17 – Frank H. Netter, American artist, physician and medical illustrator (b. 1906)
- September 24 – Dr. Seuss, American author (b. 1904)
- September 25 – Barbara Rose Johns, American civil rights activist (b. 1935)
- September 28 – Miles Davis, American jazz trumpeter (b. 1926)
- September 29 – Grace Zaring Stone, American writer (b. 1891)

=== October ===
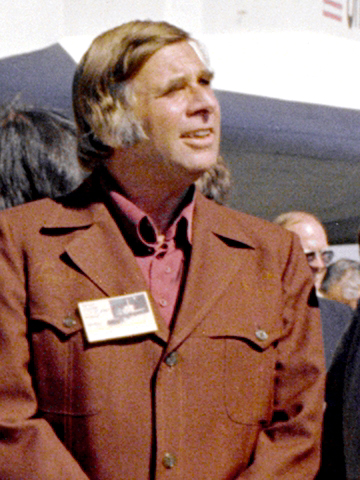
Gene Roddenberry

- October 6 – Florence B. Seibert, American biochemist (b. 1897)
- October 7 – Leo Durocher, American baseball player, coach and manager (b. 1905)
- October 9 – Thalmus Rasulala, American actor (b. 1939)
- October 11 – Redd Foxx, American comedian and actor (b. 1922)
- October 12
  - Aline MacMahon, American actress (b. 1899)
  - Regis Toomey, American actor (b. 1898)
- October 17 – Tennessee Ernie Ford, American singer (b. 1919)
- October 24 – Gene Roddenberry, American television producer (b. 1921)
- October 25 – Bill Graham, American promoter (b. 1931)
- October 27 – Howard Kingsbury, American Olympic rower – Men's eights (b. 1904)
- October 28 – Sylvia Fine, American lyricist (b. 1913)
- October 31 – Joseph Papp, American theater director and producer (b. 1921)

=== November ===
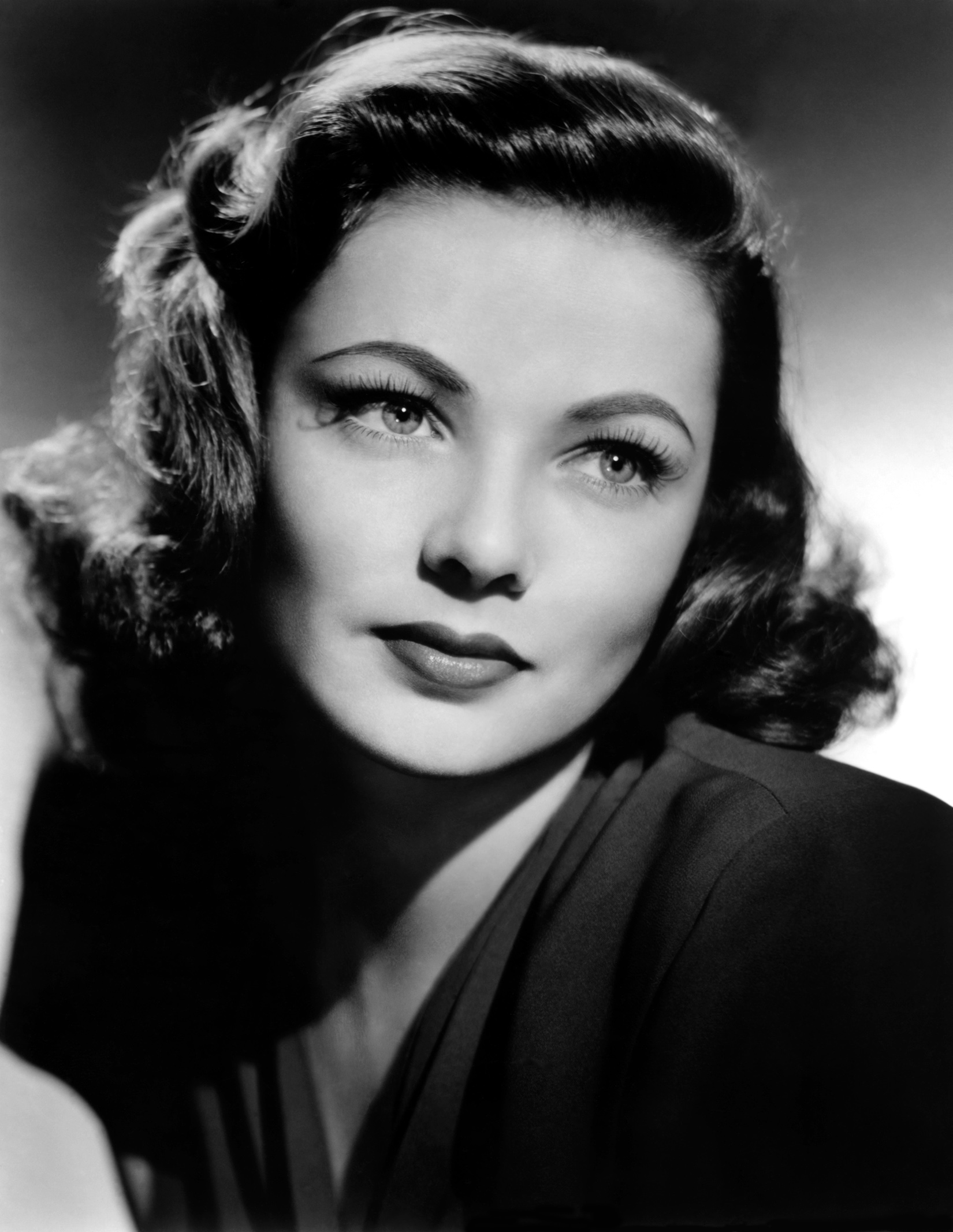
Gene Tierney

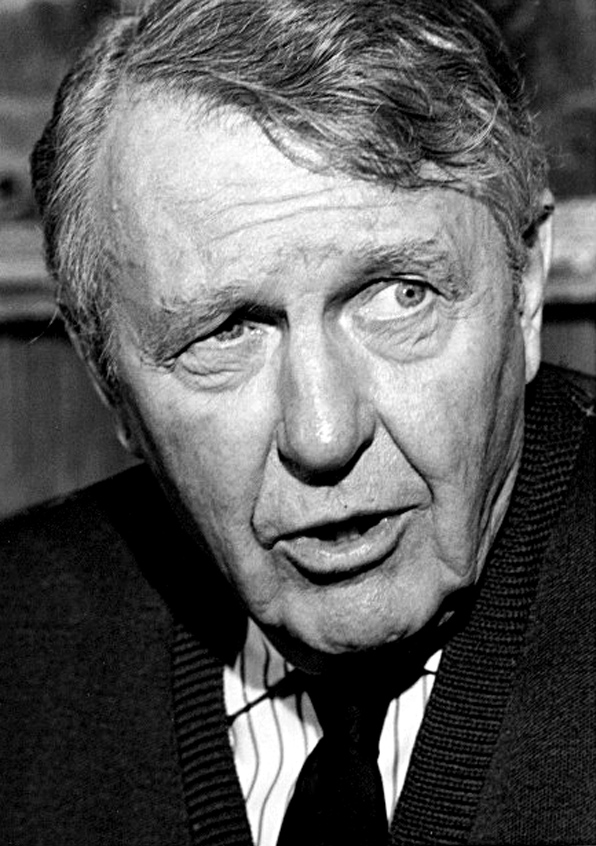
Ralph Bellamy

- November 2
  - Irwin Allen, American film and television producer (b. 1916)
  - Mort Shuman, American singer, pianist and songwriter (b. 1938)
- November 3 – Chris Bender, American musician (b. 1972)
- November 5 – Fred MacMurray, American actor (b. 1908)
- November 6 – Gene Tierney, American actress (b. 1920)
- November 8 – John Kirkpatrick, American pianist and music scholar (b. 1905)
- November 14 – Tony Richardson, English film and theater director (b. 1928)
- November 19 – Reggie Nalder, Austrian actor (b. 1907)
- November 21 – Daniel Mann, American film director (b. 1912)
- November 23 – Klaus Kinski, German actor (b. 1926)
- November 24
  - Eric Carr, American drummer (heart cancer) (b. 1950)
  - Anton Furst, American art director (b. 1944)
- November 25 – Eleanor Audley, American actress (b. 1905)
- November 26
  - Carl G. Fenner, American botanist (b. 1899)
  - Ed Heinemann, American aircraft designer (b. 1908)
  - Bob Johnson, American ice hockey coach (b. 1931)
- November 29
  - Ralph Bellamy, American actor (b. 1904)
  - Frank Yerby, American novelist (b. 1916)

=== December ===
- December 1 – George Stigler, American economist (b. 1911)
- December 5 – Richard Speck, American mass murderer (b. 1941)
- December 9 – Berenice Abbott, American photographer (b. 1898)
- December 10 – Greta Kempton, American artist (b. 1901)
- December 11 – Robert Q. Lewis, American radio and television personality (b. 1920)
- December 12 – Eleanor Boardman, American actress (b. 1898)
- December 19 – Howie Dallmar, American basketball player (b. 1922)
- December 21 – Sheldon Mayer, American author and illustrator (b. 1917)
- December 24 – Marguerite Williams, African American geologist (b. 1895)

== See also ==
- 1991 in American television
- List of American films of 1991
- Timeline of United States history (1990–2009)
