= List of elections in 1904 =

The following elections occurred in the year 1904.

== Europe ==
- 1904 Belgian general election
- 1904 Italian general election
- 1904 Portuguese legislative election

=== United Kingdom ===
- 1904 Ashburton by-election
- 1904 Ayr Burghs by-election
- 1904 Chertsey by-election
- 1904 City of London by-election
- 1904 Cork City by-election
- 1904 Devonport by-election
- 1904 East Dorset by-election
- 1904 Gateshead by-election
- 1904 Harborough by-election
- 1904 Horsham by-election
- 1904 Isle of Thanet by-election
- 1904 Isle of Wight by-election
- 1904 Normanton by-election
- 1904 Norwich by-election
- 1904 Oswestry by-election
- 1904 Reading by-election
- 1904 Sowerby by-election
- 1904 St Albans by-election
- 1904 West Cavan by-election
- 1904 West Monmouthshire by-election

=== Malta ===
- April 1904 Maltese general election
- February 1904 Maltese general election
- January 1904 Maltese general election

== Asia ==
- 1904 Japanese general election

== Africa ==
- 1904 Cape Colony parliamentary election

== North America ==
=== Canada ===
- 1904 Canadian federal election
- 1904 Edmonton municipal election
- 1904 Newfoundland general election
- 1904 Prince Edward Island general election
- 1904 Quebec general election

=== United States ===
- 1904 New York state election
- 1904 United States elections
- 1904 United States presidential election

==== United States lieutenant gubernatorial ====
- 1904 Connecticut lieutenant gubernatorial election
- 1904 Illinois lieutenant gubernatorial election
- 1904 Minnesota lieutenant gubernatorial election
- 1904 Missouri lieutenant gubernatorial election
- 1904 Nebraska lieutenant gubernatorial election
- 1904 Texas lieutenant gubernatorial election
- 1904 Wisconsin lieutenant gubernatorial election

==== United States gubernatorial ====
- 1904 Arkansas gubernatorial election
- 1904 Colorado gubernatorial election
- 1904 Connecticut gubernatorial election
- 1904 Delaware gubernatorial election
- 1904 Florida gubernatorial election
- 1904 Georgia gubernatorial election
- 1904 Idaho gubernatorial election
- 1904 Illinois gubernatorial election
- 1904 Indiana gubernatorial election
- 1904 Kansas gubernatorial election
- 1904 Louisiana gubernatorial election
- 1904 Maine gubernatorial election
- 1904 Massachusetts gubernatorial election
- 1904 Michigan gubernatorial election
- 1904 Minnesota gubernatorial election
- 1904 Missouri gubernatorial election
- 1904 Montana gubernatorial election
- 1904 Nebraska gubernatorial election
- 1904 New Hampshire gubernatorial election
- 1904 New Jersey gubernatorial election
- 1904 New York gubernatorial election
- 1904 North Carolina gubernatorial election
- 1904 North Dakota gubernatorial election
- 1904 Rhode Island gubernatorial election
- 1904 South Carolina gubernatorial election
- 1904 South Dakota gubernatorial election
- 1904 Tennessee gubernatorial election
- 1904 Texas gubernatorial election
- 1904 United States gubernatorial elections
- 1904 Utah gubernatorial election
- 1904 Vermont gubernatorial election
- 1904 Washington gubernatorial election
- 1904 West Virginia gubernatorial election
- 1904 Wisconsin gubernatorial election
- 1904 Wyoming gubernatorial special election

==== United States House of Representatives ====
- 1904 United States House of Representatives elections
- United States House of Representatives elections in California, 1904
- United States House of Representatives elections in South Carolina, 1904

==== United States Senate ====
- 1904 and 1905 United States Senate elections

==== United States mayoral elections ====
- 1904 Auburn, Alabama municipal election
- 1904 Dallas mayoral election
- 1904 Manchester, New Hampshire, mayoral election
- 1904 Milwaukee mayoral election

== South America ==
- 1904 Argentine presidential election
- 1904 Colombian presidential election
- 1904 Guatemalan presidential election
- 1904 Peruvian presidential election

== Oceania ==
- 1904 Pahiatua by-election

=== Australia ===
- 1904 Bingara state by-election
- 1904 East Perth state by-election
- 1904 Glebe state by-election
- 1904 Illawarra state by-election
- 1904 Melbourne by-election
- 1904 Ryde state by-election
- 1904 Tenterfield state by-election
- 1904 Wilmot by-election
- 1904 Victorian state election

== See also ==
- Category:1904 elections
