= 1904 United States gubernatorial elections =

- November 8, 1904 (Note: Arkansas, Georgia, Louisiana, Maine and Vermont held early elections.)

33 governorships (Note: Including a special election in Wyoming.)
	Majority party	Minority party
Party	Republican	Democratic
Seats before	27	17
Seats after	25	19
Seat change	▼2	▲2
Seats up	23	10
Seats won	21	12
	Third party
Party	Silver
Seats before	1
Seats after	1
Seat change	Steady
Seats up	0
Seats won	0
- Democratic gain Democratic hold Republican gain Republican hold

United States gubernatorial elections were held in 1904, in 34 states, concurrent with the House, Senate elections and presidential election, on November 8, 1904 (except in Arkansas, Georgia, Louisiana, Maine and Vermont, which held early elections).

In Wyoming, a special election was held following the death of Governor DeForest Richards in April 1903.

== Results ==
State	Incumbent	Party	Status	Opposing candidates
Arkansas (held, 5 September 1904)	Jefferson Davis	Democratic	Re-elected, 60.97%	Harry H. Myers (Republican) 36.41% John G. Adams (Prohibition) 2.22% Scattering 0.40%
Colorado	James H. Peabody	Republican	Defeated, 46.80%	Alva Adams (Democratic) 50.64% Robert A. N. Wilson (Prohibition) 1.24% Andrew H. Floaten (Socialist) 1.07% James Merwin (People's) 0.13% J. A. Knight (Socialist Labor) 0.12%
Connecticut	Abiram Chamberlain	Republican	[data missing]	Henry Roberts (Republican) 54.88% A. Heaton Richardson (Democratic) 41.48% George A. Sweetland (Socialist) 2.30% Oliver G. Beard (Prohibition) 0.79% Timothy Sullivan (Socialist Labor) 0.30% Joseph Sheldon (Populist) 0.25%
Delaware	John Hunn	Republican	Retired, Republican victory	Preston Lea (Republican) 51.40% Caleb S. Pennewill (Democratic) 45.13% Joseph H. Chandler (Independent Republican) 1.83% John R. Price (Prohibition) 1.34% Gustave E. Reinicke (Socialist) 0.30%
Florida	William Sherman Jennings	Democratic	Term-limited, Democratic victory	Napoleon Bonaparte Broward (Democratic) 79.16% Matthew B. MacFarlane (Republican) 17.37% W. R. Healey (Socialist) 3.47%
Georgia (held, 5 October 1904)	Joseph M. Terrell	Democratic	Re-elected, 100.00%	(Democratic primary results); Joseph M. Terrell unopposed
Idaho	John T. Morrison	Republican	Lost re-nomination, Republican victory	Frank R. Gooding (Republican) 58.74% Henry Heitfeld (Democratic) 34.02% Theodore B. Shaw (Socialist) 5.61% Edwin R. Headley (Prohibition) 1.39% T. W. Bartley (People's) 0.25%
Illinois	Richard Yates Jr.	Republican	Lost re-nomination, Republican victory	Charles Samuel Deneen (Republican) 59.09% Lawrence B. Stringer (Democratic) 31.21% John Collins (Socialist) 5.51% Robert H. Patton (Prohibition) 3.30% Philip Veal (Socialist Labor) 0.41% James Hogan (People's) 0.41% Andrew G. Specht (Continental) 0.07%
Indiana	Winfield T. Durbin	Republican	Term-limited, Republican victory	James Frank Hanly (Republican) 53.51% John Worth Kern (Democratic) 40.95% Felix T. McWhirter (Prohibition) 3.38% Matthew Hallenberger (Socialist) 1.64% Leroy Templeton (People's) 0.31% E. J. Dillon (Socialist Labor) 0.21%
Kansas	Willis J. Bailey	Republican	Retired, Republican victory	Edward W. Hoch (Republican) 57.92% David M. Dale (Democratic) 36.29% Granville Lowther (Socialist) 3.75% James Kerr (Prohibition) 2.04%
Louisiana (held, 19 April 1904)	William Wright Heard	Democratic	Term-limited, Democratic victory	Newton C. Blanchard (Democratic) 89.04% W. J. Behan (Republican) 10.96%
Maine (held, 12 September 1904)	John Fremont Hill	Republican	[data missing]	William T. Cobb (Republican) 58.52% Cyrus W. Davis (Democratic) 38.13% Nathan F. Woodbury (Prohibition) 2.12% Wilbur G. Hapgood (Socialist) 1.21% Scattering 0.02%
Massachusetts	John L. Bates	Republican	Defeated, 44.14%	William L. Douglas (Democratic) 52.14% John Quincy Adams (Socialist) 2.58% Oliver W. Cobb (Prohibition) 0.70% Michael T. Berry (Socialist Labor) 0.45%
Michigan	Aaron T. Bliss	Republican	Retired, Republican victory	Fred M. Warner (Republican) 54.09% Woodbridge N. Ferris (Democratic) 42.61% James M. Shackleton (Prohibition) 1.98% Clayton J. Lamb (Socialist) 1.18% Meiko Meyer (Socialist Labor) 0.15%
Minnesota	Samuel R. Van Sant	Republican	Retired, Democratic victory	John Albert Johnson (Democratic) 48.71% Robert C. Dunn (Republican) 46.13% Charles W. Dorsett (Prohibition) 2.49% Jay E. Nash (Public Ownership) 1.91% A. W. M. Anderson (Socialist Labor) 0.76%
Missouri	Alexander Monroe Dockery	Democratic	Term-limited, Democratic victory	Joseph W. Folk (Democratic) 50.73% Cyrus P. Walbridge (Republican) 46.05% Ernest T. Behrens (Socialist) 1.71% Orange J. Hill (Prohibition) 0.87% William C. Alldredge (People's) 0.42% J. E. White (Socialist Labor) 0.22%
Montana	Joseph K. Toole	Democratic	Re-elected, 53.79%	William Lindsay (Republican) 40.99% Malcolm A. O'Malley (Socialist) 5.22%
Nebraska	John H. Mickey	Republican	Re-elected, 49.67%	George W. Berge (Democratic/Populist fusion) 45.61% Clarence F. Swander (Prohibition) 2.44% Benjamin H. Vail (Socialist) 2.28%
New Hampshire	Nahum J. Bachelder	Republican	[data missing]	John McLane (Republican) 57.83% Henry F. Hollis (Democratic) 40.05% Sumner F. Claflin (Socialist) 1.07% David Heald (Prohibition) 0.97% George Howie (People's) 0.07% Scattering 0.02%
New Jersey	Franklin Murphy	Republican	Term-limited, Republican victory	Edward C. Stokes (Republican) 53.50% Charles C. Black (Democratic) 41.56% Henry R. Kearns (Socialist) 2.05% James Parker (Prohibition) 1.55% George A. Honnecker (Populist) 0.76% George P. Herrschaft (Socialist Labor) 0.58%
New York	Benjamin Odell	Republican	Retired, Republican victory	Frank W. Higgins (Republican) 50.27% D. Cady Herrick (Democratic) 45.29% Thomas Pendergast (Social Democrat) 2.24% John McKee (Prohibition) 1.27% Daniel De Leon (Socialist Labor) 0.56% Alfred J. Boulton (People's) 0.37%
North Carolina	Charles Brantley Aycock	Democratic	Term-limited, Democratic victory	Robert B. Glenn (Democratic) 61.72% Charles J. Harris (Republican) 38.11% James M. Templeton (Prohibition) 0.11% William Pegram (Socialist) 0.05%
North Dakota	Frank White	Republican	Retired, Republican victory	Elmore Y. Sarles (Republican) 70.71% Marthinus F. Hegge (Democratic) 24.65% Arthur Basset (Socialist) 2.59% Hans H. Aaker (Prohibition) 2.04%
Rhode Island	Lucius F. C. Garvin	Democratic	Defeated, 47.70%	George H. Utter (Republican) 48.94% William E. Brightman (Prohibition) 1.58% John Edward Carney (Socialist) 1.08% Peter McDermott (Socialist Labor) 0.71%
South Carolina	Duncan Clinch Heyward	Democratic	Re-elected	Duncan Clinch Heyward (Democratic) 100.00% (Democratic primary results); Duncan Clinch Heyward unopposed
South Dakota	Charles N. Herreid	Republican	Retired, Republican victory	Samuel H. Elrod (Republican) 68.29% Louis N. Crill (Democratic) 24.68% Freeman Knowles (Socialist) 3.02% W. J. Edgar (Prohibition) 2.91% R. C. Warne (Populist) 1.11%
Tennessee	James B. Frazier	Democratic	Re-elected, 55.72%	Jessie M. Littleton (Republican) 43.81% John M. Ray (Socialist) 0.47%
Texas	Samuel W. T. Lanham	Democratic	Re-elected, 73.57%	J. G. Lowden (Republican) 20.29% Pat B. Clark (Populist) 3.32% W. D. Jackson (Prohibition) 1.61% Word H. Mills (Socialist) 1.02% Frank Leitner (Socialist Labor) 0.20%
Utah	Heber Manning Wells	Republican	Lost re-nomination, Republican victory	John C. Cutler (Republican) 49.97% James Henry Moyle (Democratic) 37.40% William Montague Ferry (American) 7.82% Joseph A. Kauffman (Socialist) 4.81%
Vermont (held, 6 September 1904)	John G. McCullough	Republican	Retired, Republican victory	Charles J. Bell (Republican) 72.22% Eli H. Porter (Democratic) 24.85% Homer Fletcher Comings (Prohibition) 1.76% Clarence E. Morse (Socialist) 1.15% Scattering 0.01%
Washington	Henry McBride	Republican	Lost re-nomination, Republican victory	Albert Edward Mead (Republican) 51.34% George Turner (Democratic) 40.87% David Burgess (Socialist) 5.13% Ambrose H. Sherwood (Prohibition) 1.92% William McCormick (Socialist Labor) 0.74%
West Virginia	Albert B. White	Republican	Term-limited, Republican victory	William M. O. Dawson (Republican) 50.78% John Jacob Cornwell (Democratic) 47.02% Joseph W. Bedford (Prohibition) 1.67% J. M. Eskey (Socialist) 0.53%
Wisconsin	Robert M. LaFollette	Republican	Re-elected, 50.55%	George Wilbur Peck (Democratic) 39.22% William A. Arnold (Social Democrat) 5.53% Edward Schofield (National Republican) 2.70% William H. Clark (Prohibition) 1.95% Charles M. Minkley (Socialist Labor) 0.06%
Wyoming (special election)	Fenimore Chatterton	Republican	Lost re-nomination, Republican victory	Bryant B. Brooks (Republican) 57.48% John E. Osborne (Democratic) 39.27% James W. Gates (Socialist) 2.64% George W. Blain (Prohibition) 0.62%

== See also ==
- 1904 United States elections
