= Governor Frazier =

Governor Frazier may refer to:

- James B. Frazier (1856–1937), 28th Governor of Tennessee
- Lynn Frazier (1874–1947), 12th Governor of North Dakota
