= Lawrence Y. Sherman =

American politician (1858–1939)

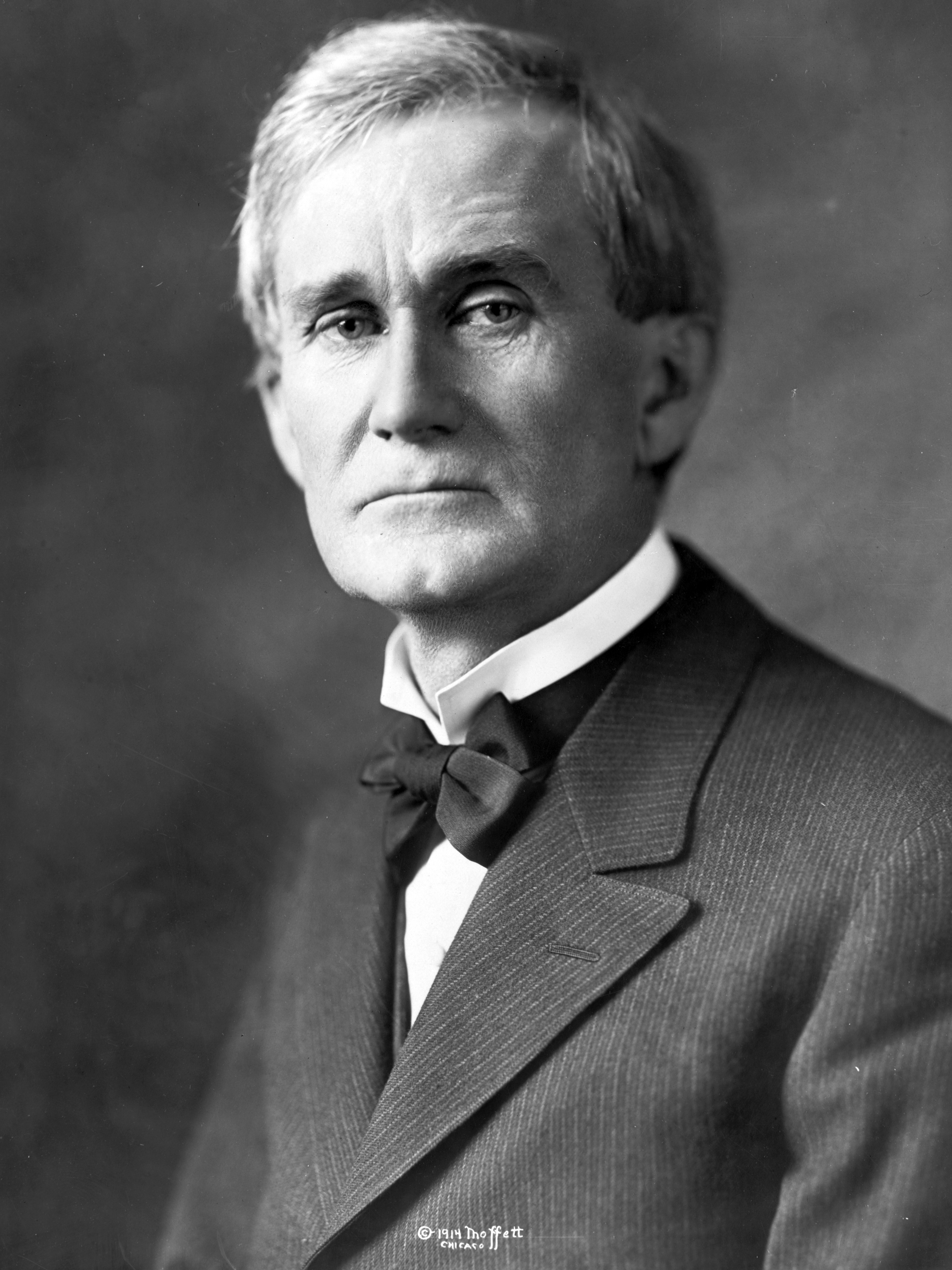
- Sherman in 1914

United States Senator from Illinois
- In office March 26, 1913 – March 3, 1921
- Preceded by: William Lorimer
- Succeeded by: William B. McKinley

28th Lieutenant Governor of Illinois
- In office January 9, 1905 – January 18, 1909
- Governor: Charles S. Deneen
- Preceded by: William Northcott
- Succeeded by: John G. Oglesby

40th Speaker of the Illinois House of Representatives
- In office January 4, 1899 – January 7, 1903
- Preceded by: Edward C. Curtis
- Succeeded by: John Henry Miller

Member of the Illinois House of Representatives
- In office 1897–1905

Personal details
- Born: November 8, 1858 Miami County, Ohio, U.S.
- Died: September 15, 1939 (aged 80) Daytona Beach, Florida, U.S.
- Party: Republican
- Education: McKendree University

Lawrence Yates Sherman (November 8, 1858 – September 15, 1939) was a Republican politician from the State of Illinois. He served as United States Senator, the 28th lieutenant governor, and as Speaker of the Illinois House of Representatives.

Sherman is best known for his role in preventing the ratification of the Treaty of Versailles, which kept the United States out of the League of Nations.

== Personal life ==
Sherman was born on November 8, 1858 near Piqua in Miami County, Ohio, the son of Nelson Sherman and Maria (Yates) Sherman. A year later, he moved with his parents to McDonough County, Illinois and eight years later, they moved to Grove Township in Jasper County, Illinois.

He attended the common schools and Lee's Academy in Coles County, and in 1882 earned an LL.B. degree from McKendree University in Lebanon, Illinois. He studied law under Judge Henry Horner and Professor Samuel H. Deneen and was admitted to the bar in Illinois in 1882.

In 1891, he married Ella M. Crews, who died in 1893. On March 4, 1908, he married Estelle Spitler, who died in 1910.

== Early politics ==
After passing the bar, Sherman involved himself in Illinois politics. He was city attorney for Macomb, Illinois from 1885 to 1887 and a McDonough County judge from 1886 to 1890. In 1890, he entered into the private practice of law in Macomb.

Sherman served 4 terms in the Illinois House of Representatives from 1897 to 1905. During his second term in 1899 he was chosen as the 40th Speaker of the House, and in 1901 he became the second Republican to serve two terms in that office, 5th overall. While Speaker, Sherman played an important role in the creation of Western Illinois State Normal School (now Western Illinois University) and was instrumental in the selection of Macomb for its location. Sherman Hall, the main administrative building at Western Illinois University, was renamed after Senator Sherman in 1957.

In 1904, he ran an unsuccessful bid for Governor of Illinois, but was nominated for the Lieutenant Governor in that year's election for that office. He became the 28th Lieutenant Governor of Illinois, serving from 1905 to 1909. As lieutenant governor he was ex officio president of the Illinois Senate.

In 1909, he ran for Mayor of Springfield, Illinois, but lost by 300 votes. He served as president of the Illinois state board of administration, public charities, 1909-1913 before returning to the practice of law in Springfield.

As a delegate to the 1912 Republican National Convention, Sherman supported Theodore Roosevelt, but then worked to prevent the party split that resulted in the Bull Moose Party. After the split, he supported the party nominee, William Howard Taft, for president.

== Senate elections ==
In 1912, Sherman entered the Republican "advisory" primary for the United States Senate, challenging incumbent five-term Republican Senator Shelby M. Cullom. Cullom had suffered politically over his support for the other Illinois senator, William Lorimer, who was embroiled in a scandal over alleged bribery in his 1909 election to the Senate. On April 9, Sherman defeated Cullom by 60,000 votes and Cullom withdrew his name from consideration by the General Assembly.

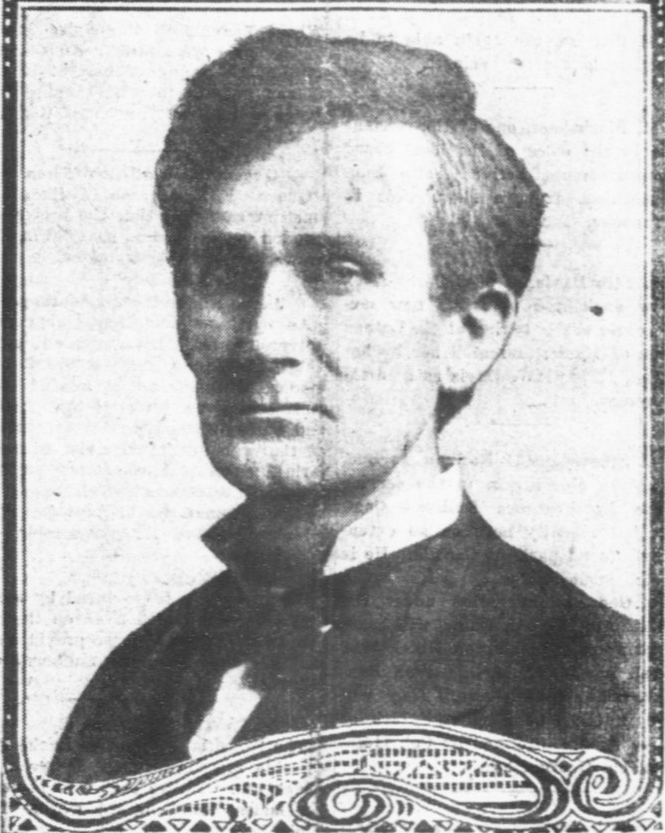
Lawrence Sherman in 1912.

Three months after the primary, the United States Senate invalidated the election of Lorimer and declared the seat vacant. The Illinois Attorney General, William H. Stead determined that the General Assembly had failed to properly elect Lorimer in 1909 and so the Governor could not appoint a replacement. As a result, the General Assembly had two Senate seats to fill.

In the November 1912 election, the Republicans lost control of the state due to the Republican / Progressive split. But while the Democrats held a plurality of the General Assembly, they did not have a majority. The General Assembly took up the matter of electing the senators on February 1. On March 26, in a compromise arranged by Governor Edward F. Dunne, the General Assembly elected Democrat J. Hamilton Lewis to fill the Cullom seat and chose Sherman to fill the two remaining years of Lorimer's term.

In 1914, he was elected to a full term, this time by the people of Illinois due to the passage of the Seventeenth Amendment, which he had supported prior to being elected to the Senate.

In 1916, Sherman made the decision to retire from politics not to run for reelection in 1920, due to his failing hearing, which prevented him from hearing what was said on the Senate floor.

== Senate years ==
He served as chairman of the Committee on the District of Columbia during the Sixty-sixth Congress.

=== Treaty of Versailles ===
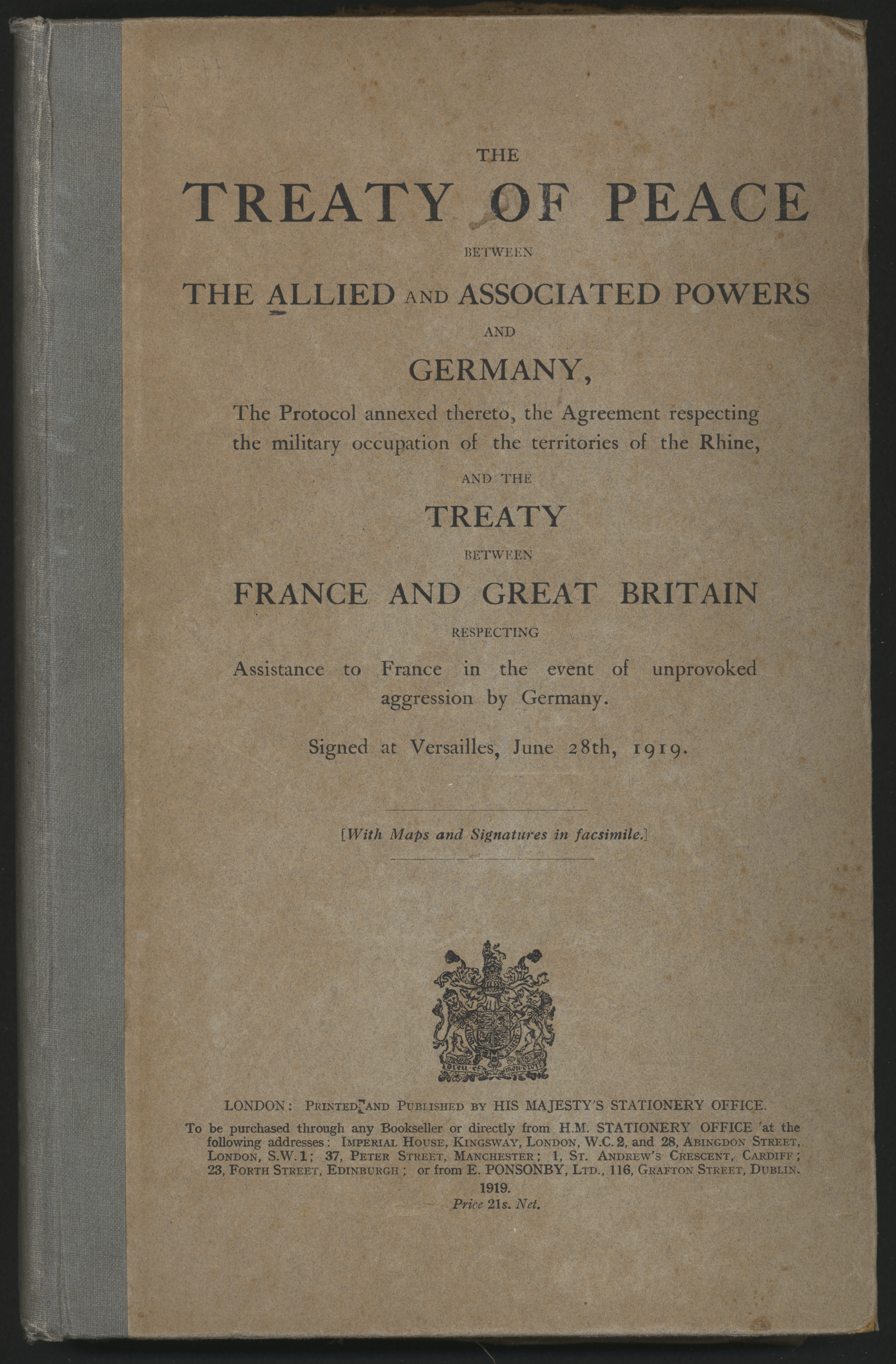
Printed copy of the Treaty of Versailles in English

As one of the group of senators known as the "irreconcilables" or the "bitter-enders", Sherman opposed the ratification of the Treaty of Versailles and of U.S. involvement in the League of Nations, and according to Historian Aaron Chandler, played a key role in its defeat. He characterized the treaty as "humanitarian in purpose, but impracticable in operation", and believed the league would be weak.

Sherman was a nationalist, but not an isolationist. He maintained that the country's interests would be served by maintaining close relations with England and France, and was willing to accept limited obligations to America's wartime allies. He opposed any league that would limit America's sovereignty, and believed that membership in a league of nations with divergent interests would weaken the United States in foreign affairs, by giving equal votes to small, weak countries, and allowing them to join together and dictate foreign policy to the United States, Great Britain, France, and Italy.

Sherman was concerned with America's influence in the League. He criticized the provisions of Article 7 that would give to the British Empire, counting its colonies, six votes, while the United States would have only one. He said that "Great Britain with her diplomatic influence in the Old World much superior to ours could easily secure a majority of the nations to outvote us any time she wished." He argued that the large number of predominately Catholic nations in the League were dominated by the Vatican, which would leave the United States beholden to the Pope in foreign affairs. He was convinced that membership in the league would result in the United States paying most of the cost for reconstructing Europe after the war, arguing that the assessments would be based on ability to pay and that "we would therefore become a perpetual taxpayer for the benefit of Europe."

Sherman opposed some of the non-league provisions of the treaty. He sharply criticized the Shantung provision of the treaty which transferred German concessions in Shantung to Japan rather than return them to China, saying "40,000,000 Chinese in Shantung were denied the right of self-determination and delivered to Japan under treaty". He also forcefully condemned Britain and France for failing, with Wilson's approval, to honour the commitments they had made to Italy under the treaty of London of 1915 concerning its eastern borders. He called it rank ingratitude, given the sacrifice of 5 million Italian soldiers—a contribution he considered decisive and no less important than America’s own entry into the war: Italy’s effort had compelled Germany to divert substantial forces from the western front to rescue Austria-Hungary on its southern flank. In addition, Sherman criticized the territorial concessions to Poland as insufficient.

He was one of the 39 senators who joined the "Round-robin" resolution in March 1919, declaring that the peace treaty with Germany should be separated from any proposal for a League of Nations, and vowing to vote against the treaty in its current form.

During a vote on amendments to the treaty, after Woodrow Wilson had stated that he would not accept any amendments, Sherman said:

I will vote for any pertinent amendment that comes along. I hope every one of them will be adopted. There could not be confusion worse confounded if every amendment offered here were voted into the treaty. . . . So vote them in; and then after every one of the amendments is voted into the treaty and the league, I will vote to reject it all."

When the treaty was voted on by the full Senate with reservations attached, Sherman voted against the Treaty, as did President Wilson's supporters at his urging. After its defeat, Sherman delivered an address he called "a funeral oration over the defunct remains" of the treaty, and said it was one of the few times that he found himself in agreement with Wilson.

== Post-Senate ==
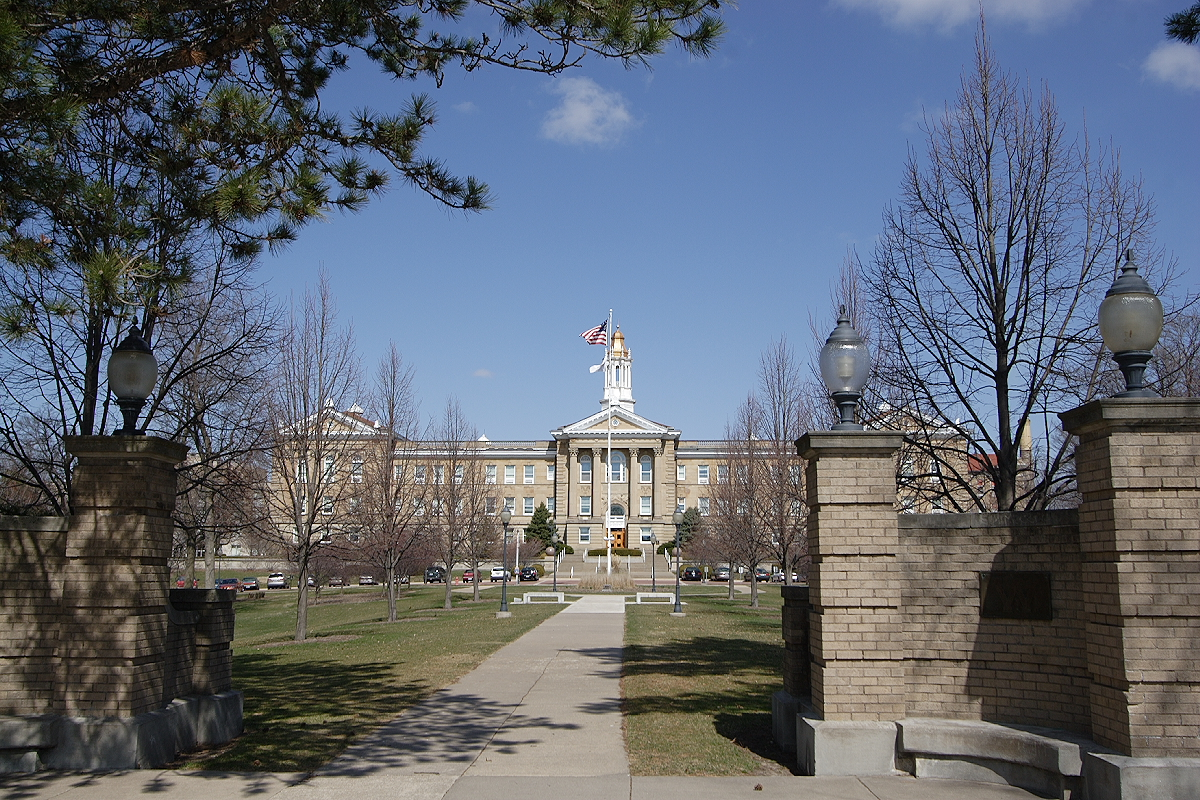
Sherman Hall at Western Illinois University was named after Lawrence Sherman in 1957.

After leaving the Senate, Sherman resumed the practice of law again in Springfield. In 1924 Sherman moved to Daytona Beach, Florida, and continued the practice of law there, also engaging in the investment business. He helped organize the First National Bank of Daytona Beach and served as its president in 1925 and was chairman of its board of directors from 1925 to 1927. Beginning in 1930, when it merged with the Atlantic National Bank of Jacksonville, he was a director at that bank until he retired.

Sherman retired from all active business pursuits in 1933. He died in Daytona Beach, Florida, on September 15, 1939, and was interred at Faunce Cemetery in Montrose, Illinois.

== Notes ==
Party political offices
| Preceded by William Northcott | Republican nominee for Lieutenant Governor of Illinois; 1904 | Succeeded by John G. Oglesby |
| First | Republican nominee for U.S. Senator from Illinois (Class 3); 1914 | Succeeded by William B. McKinley |
Political offices
| Preceded by William Northcott | Lieutenant Governor of Illinois; 1905–1909 | Succeeded by John G. Oglesby |
U.S. Senate
| Preceded by William Lorimer | Class 3 U.S. Senator from Illinois; 1913–1921 | Succeeded by William B. McKinley |
