= 1904 Wisconsin lieutenant gubernatorial election =

- November 8, 1904
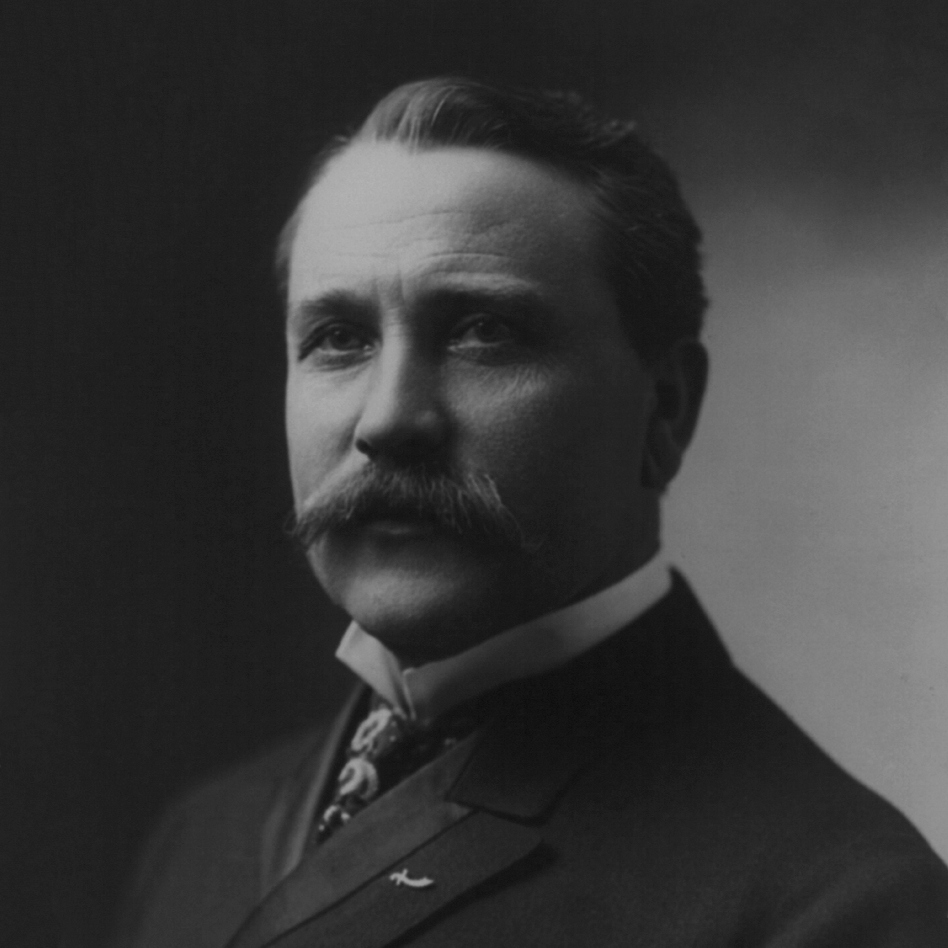

| Nominee | James O. Davidson | Henry A. Lathrop | Henry J. Ammann |
| Party | Republican | Democratic | Social Democratic |
| Popular vote | 247,160 | 151,403 | 28,107 |
| Percentage | 55.28% | 33.86% | 6.29% |
Lieutenant Governor before election
James O. Davidson
Republican
Elected Lieutenant Governor
James O. Davidson
Republican

The 1904 Wisconsin lieutenant gubernatorial election was held on November 8, 1904, in order to elect the lieutenant governor of Wisconsin. Incumbent Republican lieutenant governor James O. Davidson defeated Democratic nominee and former member of the Wisconsin State Assembly Henry A. Lathrop, Social Democratic nominee Henry J. Ammann, National Republican nominee and former Speaker of the Wisconsin State Assembly George H. Ray and Prohibition nominee John H. Nicholson.

== General election ==
On election day, November 8, 1904, incumbent Republican lieutenant governor James O. Davidson won re-election by a margin of 95,757 votes against his foremost opponent Democratic nominee Henry A. Lathrop, thereby retaining Republican control over the office of lieutenant governor. Davidson was sworn in for his second term on January 2, 1905.

=== Results ===
Wisconsin lieutenant gubernatorial election, 1904
| Party | Candidate | Votes | % |
|---|---|---|---|
| Republican | James O. Davidson (incumbent) | 247,160 | 55.28 |
| Democratic | Henry A. Lathrop | 151,403 | 33.86 |
| Social Democratic | Henry J. Ammann | 28,107 | 6.29 |
| National Republican | George H. Ray | 10,864 | 2.43 |
| Prohibition | John H. Nicholson | 9,152 | 2.05 |
| | Scattering | 424 | 0.09 |
| Total votes | | 447,110 | 100.00 |
| Republican hold | | | |
