= Sherman Hall (Western Illinois University) =

- Western Illinois State Normal School Building
- U.S. National Register of Historic Places
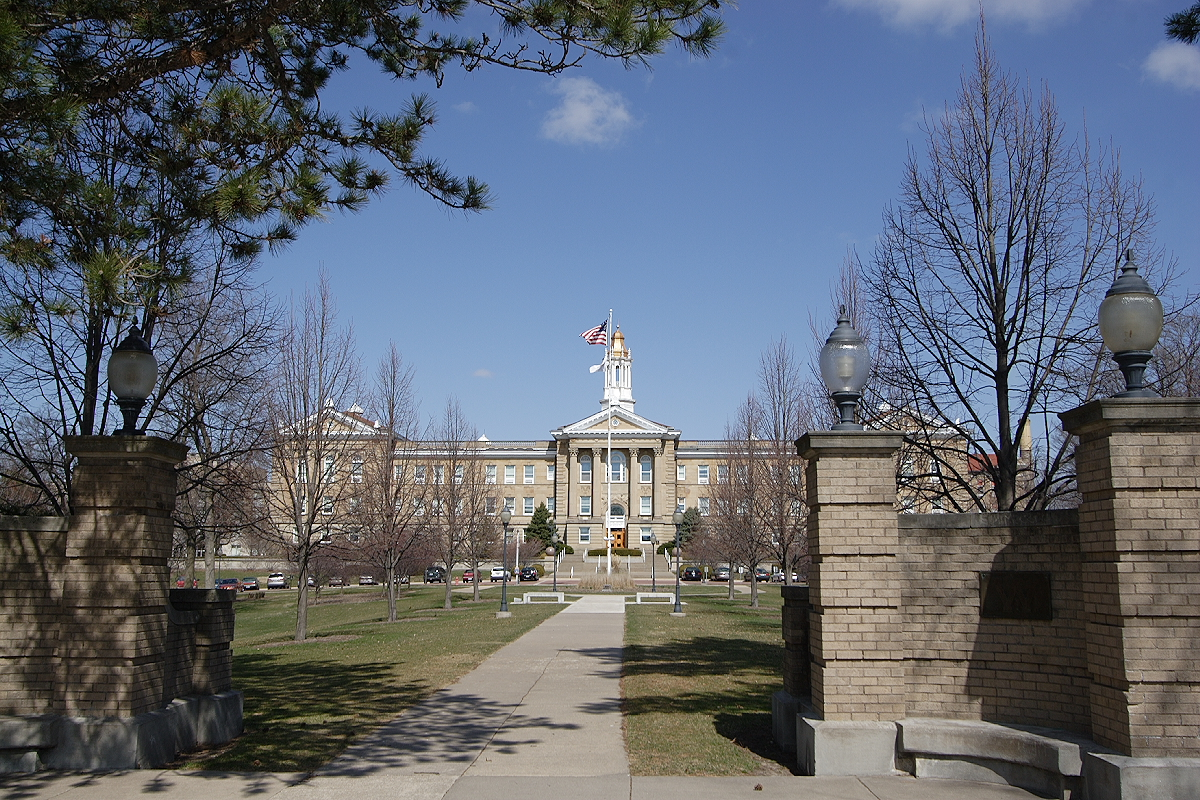
- Sherman Hall, 2006

- Location within Illinois Location within the United States
- Location: 1 University Cir., Macomb, Illinois
- Coordinates: 40°27′51″N 90°41′00″W
- Area: 6.2 acres (2.5 ha)
- Built: 1900
- Built by: Tri-City Construction Co.
- Architect: Wilson, Robert Bruce
- Architectural style: Classical Revival
- NRHP reference No.: 98000470
- Added to NRHP: May 20, 1998

Sherman Hall is the main administrative building of Western Illinois University and site of the original Western Illinois State Normal School in Macomb, Illinois.

== History ==
Designed by Illinois architect Robert Watson, Sherman Hall is a three-story, mixed classical revival-style building. Construction on Sherman Hall began on December 21, 1900 at the cost of $302,950.

Sherman Hall opened to the public in 1902 as the main building of Western Illinois State Normal School. Sherman Hall was the school's only building until Garwood Hall was built in 1914. At the turn of the 20th century, the hall contained classrooms, an auditorium, a gymnasium, a library, laboratories and administrative offices.

The building was referred to as the "Main Building" until it was renamed in honor of Lawrence Sherman, an influential Macomb lawyer and speaker of the Illinois House of Representatives, in 1956.

Sherman Hall was listed on the National Register of Historic Places in 1998 as "Western Illinois State Normal School Building." This listing also encompasses nearby Garwood Hall because it is linked to Sherman Hall by a passageway as well as the Western Illinois University Art Gallery because it was the original heating annex for Sherman Hall.

== See also ==
- Western Illinois University
