= 1902 Tennessee gubernatorial election =

- November 4, 1902
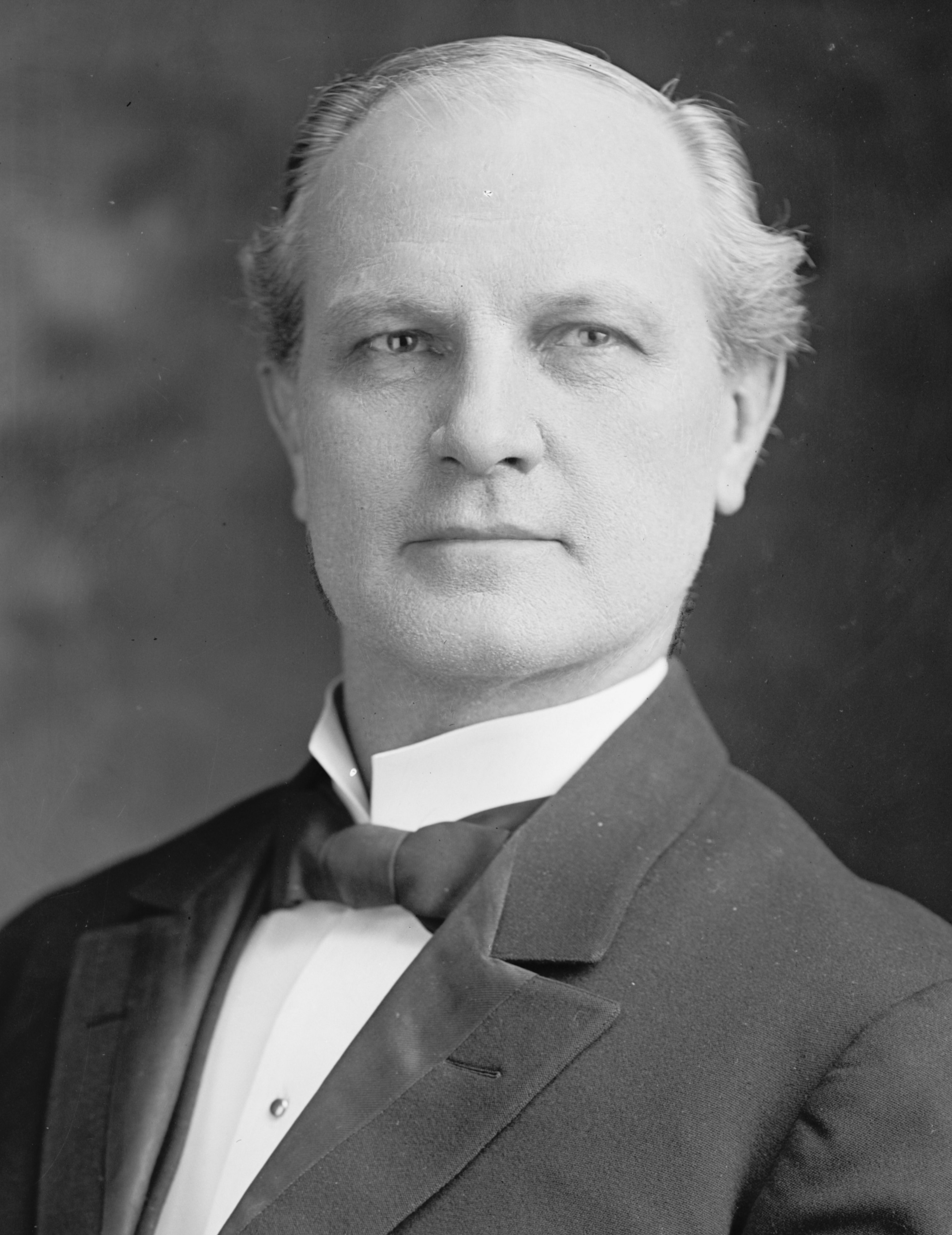

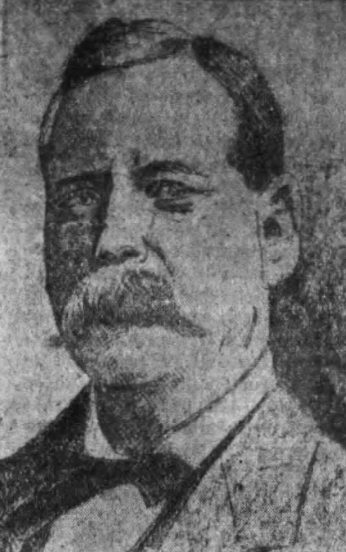
| Nominee | James B. Frazier | Henry Tyler Campbell |
| Party | Democratic | Republican |
| Popular vote | 98,902 | 59,007 |
| Percentage | 61.77% | 36.86% |
- County results Frazier: 40–50% 50–60% 60–70% 70–80% 80–90% >90% Campbell: 50–60% 60–70% 70–80% 80–90%
Governor before election
Benton McMillin
Democratic
Elected Governor
James B. Frazier
Democratic

The 1902 Tennessee gubernatorial election was held on November 4, 1902. Incumbent Democratic governor Benton McMillin did not seek re-election. Democratic nominee James B. Frazier defeated Republican nominee Henry Tyler Campbell with 61.77% of the vote.

The 1902 gubernatorial campaign is remembered as the last in which the candidates canvassed the state via horse-drawn carriages. The general election was marked by low turnout, which benefitted Democrats.

== Nominations ==
Nominations were made by party conventions.

=== Democratic nomination ===
The Democratic convention was held on May 29 at Nashville.

==== Candidate ====
- James B. Frazier, attorney and judge, nominated by acclamation

=== Republican nomination ===
The Republican convention was held on June 18 at Nashville.

==== Candidate ====
- Henry Tyler Campbell, judge

== General election ==
=== Candidates ===
- Henry Tyler Campbell, Republican
- R. S. Cheves, Prohibition
- James B. Frazier, Democratic

=== Results ===
1902 Tennessee gubernatorial election
| Party | Candidate | Votes | % | ±% |
|---|---|---|---|---|
| Democratic | James B. Frazier | 98,902 | 61.77% | |
| Republican | Henry Tyler Campbell | 59,007 | 36.86% | |
| Prohibition | R. S. Cheves | 2,193 | 1.37% | |
| Majority | | 39,895 | 24.91% | |
| Turnout | | 160,102 | 100.00% | |
| Democratic hold | | Swing | | |

== Bibliography ==
- Dubin, Michael J. (2014). United States Gubernatorial Elections, 1861-1911: The Official Results by State and County. Jefferson, North Carolina: McFarland. ISBN 978-0-7864-4722-0.
- Glashan, Roy R. (1979). American Governors and Gubernatorial Elections, 1775-1978. Meckler Books. ISBN 0-930466-17-9.
