= April 1904 Maltese general election =

Early general elections were held in Malta on 12 April 1904, after all the candidates elected in February resigned immediately after the elections in protest against the 1903 "Chamberlain" Constitution. All eight candidates were again unopposed and all resigned immediately after the elections. However, fresh elections were not called until 1907.

== Background ==
The elections were held under the Chamberlain Constitution, with members elected from eight single-member constituencies.

District	Towns
I	Valletta East
II	Valletta West, Msida, Sliema, St. Julian's
III	Floriana, Pietà, Ħamrun, Qormi, Żebbuġ
IV	Cospicua, Birgu, Kalkara, Żabbar, Marsaskala
V	Senglea, New Village, Luqa, Gudja, Għaxaq, Żejtun, Marsaxlokk, Saint George's Bay and Birżebbuġa
VI	Birkirkara, Balzan, Lija, Attard, Għargħur, Naxxar, Mosta, Mellieħa
VII	Mdina, Rabat, Siġġiewi, Dingli, Qrendi, Mqabba, Żurrieq, Bubaqra, Safi, Kirkop
VIII	Gozo and Comino
Source: Schiavone, p17

== Results ==
A total of 7,991 people were registered to vote, but no votes were cast as all candidates were unopposed.

Constituency	Name	Votes	Notes
I	Andrè Pullicino	–	Re-elected
II	Paolo Sammut	–	Re-elected
III	Cikku Azzopardi	–	Re-elected
IV	Beniamino Bonnici	–	Re-elected
V	Salvatore Cachia Zammit	–	Re-elected
VI	Fransesco Wettinger	–	Re-elected
VII	Alfred Micallef	–	Re-elected
VIII	Fortunato Mizzi	–	Re-elected
Source: Schiavone, p181
