= 1904 United States presidential election in Tennessee =

- November 8, 1904
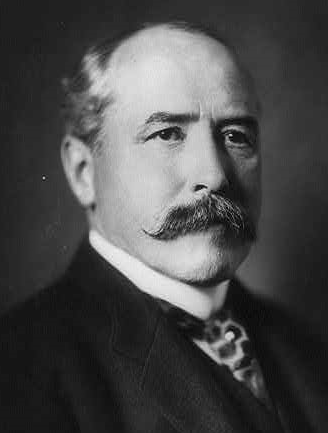

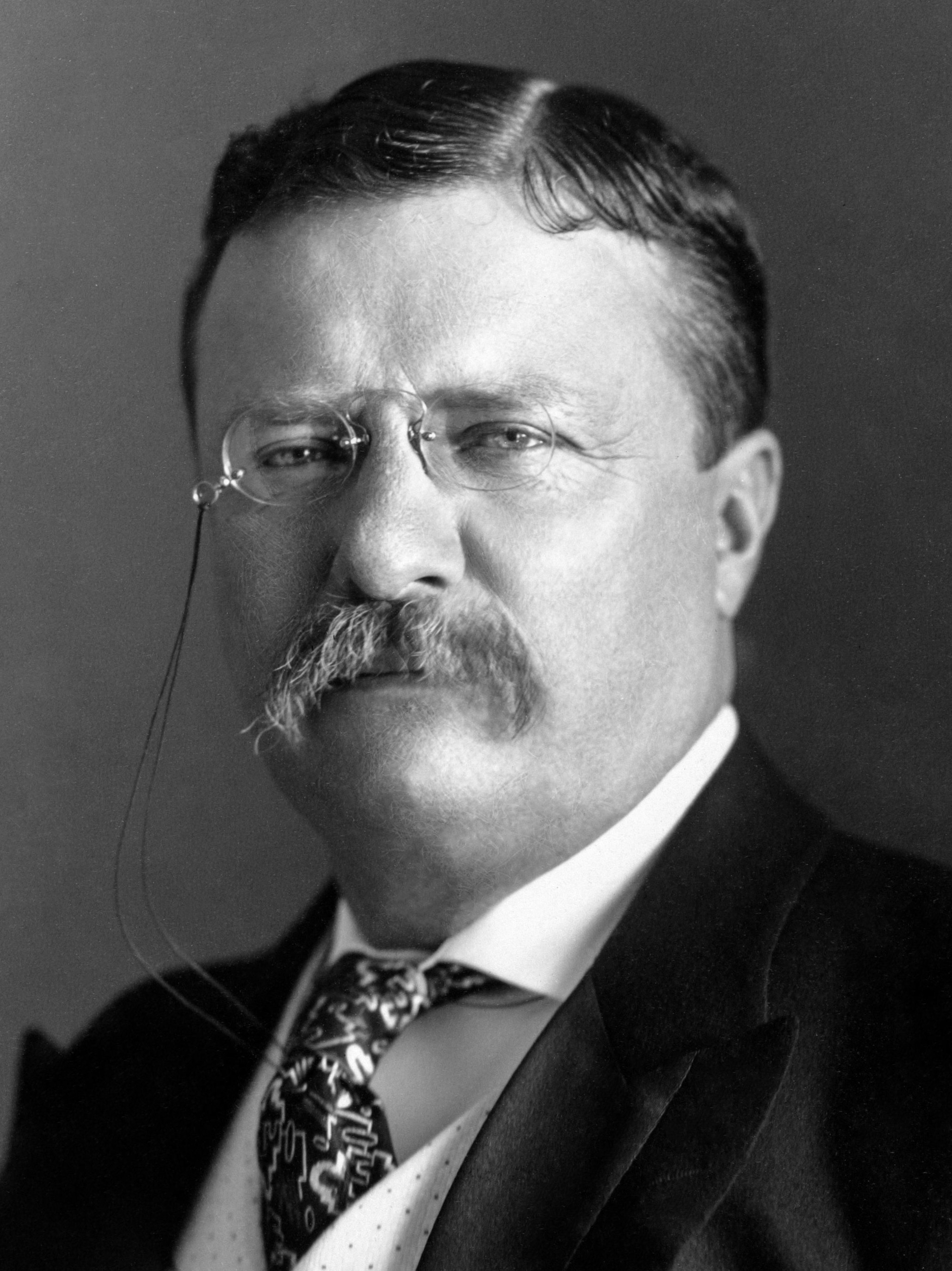
Nominee	Alton B. Parker	Theodore Roosevelt
Party	Democratic	Republican
Home state	New York	New York
Running mate	Henry G. Davis	Charles W. Fairbanks
Electoral vote	12	0
Popular vote	131,653	105,363
Percentage	54.23%	43.40%
County results
Parker
40–50%
50–60%
60–70%
70–80%
80–90%
90–100%
Roosevelt
50–60%
60–70%
70–80%
80–90%
90–100%
President before election
Theodore Roosevelt
Republican
Elected President
Theodore Roosevelt
Republican

The 1904 United States presidential election in Tennessee took place on November 8, 1904. All contemporary 45 states were part of the 1904 United States presidential election. Voters chose 12 electors to the Electoral College, which selected the president and vice president.

For over a century after the Civil War, Tennessee was divided according to political loyalties established in that war. Unionist regions covering almost all of East Tennessee, Kentucky Pennyroyal-allied Macon County, and the five West Tennessee Highland Rim counties of Carroll, Henderson, McNairy, Hardin and Wayne voted Republican – generally by landslide margins – as they saw the Democratic Party as the “war party” who had forced them into a war they did not wish to fight. Contrariwise, the rest of Middle and West Tennessee who had supported and driven the state's secession was equally fiercely Democratic as it associated the Republicans with Reconstruction. After the disfranchisement of the state's African-American population by a poll tax was largely complete in the 1890s, the Democratic Party was certain of winning statewide elections if united, although unlike the Deep South Republicans would almost always gain thirty to forty percent of the statewide vote from mountain and Highland Rim support.

Tennessee would be won by the Democratic nominees, Chief Judge Alton B. Parker of New York and his running mate Henry G. Davis of West Virginia. They defeated the Republican nominees, incumbent President Theodore Roosevelt of New York and his running mate Senator Charles W. Fairbanks of Indiana. Parker won the state by a margin of 10.83%.

Although the GOP had lost by only single figures in the previous two elections, the shift to the more conservative Democrat Parker who opposed Roosevelt's hosting of Booker T. Washington meant that the state swung slightly against the GOP.

== Results ==
1904 United States presidential election in Tennessee
Party	Candidate	Votes	Percentage	Electoral votes
Democratic	Alton B. Parker	131,653	54.23%	12
Republican	Theodore Roosevelt (incumbent)	105,363	43.40%	0
Populist	Thomas E. Watson	2,491	1.03%	0
Prohibition	Silas C. Swallow	1,889	0.78%	0
Social Democratic	Eugene V. Debs	1,354	0.56%	0
Totals		242,750	100.00%	12
Voter turnout				—

=== Results by county ===
1904 United States presidential election in Tennessee by county
County	Alton B. Parker Democratic		Theodore Roosevelt Republican		Thomas E. Watson Populist		Silas C. Swallow Prohibition		Eugene V. Debs Social Democratic		Margin		Total votes cast
County	#	%	#	%	#	%	#	%	#	%	#	%	Total votes cast
Anderson	512	26.22%	1,407	72.04%	1	0.05%	9	0.46%	24	1.23%	-895	-45.83%	1,953
Bedford	2,063	61.13%	1,301	38.55%	4	0.12%	3	0.09%	4	0.12%	762	22.58%	3,375
Benton	1,352	55.98%	974	40.33%	85	3.52%	4	0.17%	0	0.00%	378	15.65%	2,415
Bledsoe	534	42.65%	718	57.35%	0	0.00%	0	0.00%	0	0.00%	-184	-14.70%	1,252
Blount	618	23.49%	1,987	75.52%	6	0.23%	17	0.65%	3	0.11%	-1,369	-52.03%	2,631
Bradley	701	35.48%	1,242	62.85%	6	0.30%	19	0.96%	8	0.40%	-541	-27.38%	1,976
Campbell	309	19.24%	1,198	74.60%	4	0.25%	72	4.48%	23	1.43%	-889	-55.35%	1,606
Cannon	1,014	62.21%	614	37.67%	2	0.12%	0	0.00%	0	0.00%	400	24.54%	1,630
Carroll	1,633	38.07%	2,424	56.52%	203	4.73%	22	0.51%	7	0.16%	-791	-18.44%	4,289
Carter	379	12.70%	2,584	86.60%	0	0.00%	21	0.70%	0	0.00%	-2,205	-73.89%	2,984
Cheatham	1,015	70.05%	420	28.99%	8	0.55%	6	0.41%	0	0.00%	595	41.06%	1,449
Chester	824	54.07%	578	37.93%	103	6.76%	10	0.66%	9	0.59%	246	16.14%	1,524
Claiborne	959	48.70%	993	50.43%	9	0.46%	1	0.05%	7	0.36%	-34	-1.73%	1,969
Clay	544	49.59%	501	45.67%	24	2.19%	25	2.28%	3	0.27%	43	3.92%	1,097
Cocke	626	26.55%	1,726	73.20%	1	0.04%	5	0.21%	0	0.00%	-1,100	-46.65%	2,358
Coffee	1,441	71.20%	536	26.48%	1	0.05%	1	0.05%	45	2.22%	905	44.71%	2,024
Crockett	1,167	51.21%	1,102	48.35%	2	0.09%	8	0.35%	0	0.00%	65	2.85%	2,279
Cumberland	375	28.17%	898	67.47%	0	0.00%	27	2.03%	31	2.33%	-523	-39.29%	1,331
Davidson	7,735	77.69%	1,900	19.08%	85	0.85%	94	0.94%	142	1.43%	5,835	58.61%	9,956
DeKalb	1,095	45.30%	1,274	52.71%	0	0.00%	48	1.99%	0	0.00%	-179	-7.41%	2,417
Decatur	858	48.18%	921	51.71%	1	0.06%	0	0.00%	1	0.06%	-63	-3.54%	1,781
Dickson	1,490	61.34%	828	34.09%	21	0.86%	41	1.69%	49	2.02%	662	27.25%	2,429
Dyer	1,771	73.30%	625	25.87%	7	0.29%	9	0.37%	4	0.17%	1,146	47.43%	2,416
Fayette	2,010	96.22%	62	2.97%	13	0.62%	4	0.19%	0	0.00%	1,948	93.25%	2,089
Fentress	278	27.72%	724	72.18%	0	0.00%	0	0.00%	1	0.10%	-446	-44.47%	1,003
Franklin	2,180	74.71%	704	24.13%	6	0.21%	20	0.69%	8	0.27%	1,476	50.58%	2,918
Gibson	3,014	66.01%	1,421	31.12%	67	1.47%	58	1.27%	6	0.13%	1,593	34.89%	4,566
Giles	2,736	62.64%	1,583	36.24%	45	1.03%	3	0.07%	1	0.02%	1,153	26.40%	4,368
Grainger	592	31.85%	1,253	67.40%	6	0.32%	6	0.32%	2	0.11%	-661	-35.56%	1,859
Greene	2,128	50.78%	2,036	48.58%	4	0.10%	14	0.33%	9	0.21%	92	2.20%	4,191
Grundy	554	57.89%	264	27.59%	39	4.08%	2	0.21%	98	10.24%	290	30.30%	957
Hamblen	531	38.96%	812	59.57%	1	0.07%	17	1.25%	2	0.15%	-281	-20.62%	1,363
Hamilton	3,287	43.87%	3,849	51.37%	24	0.32%	106	1.41%	227	3.03%	-562	-7.50%	7,493
Hancock	382	23.49%	1,244	76.51%	0	0.00%	0	0.00%	0	0.00%	-862	-53.01%	1,626
Hardeman	1,903	63.92%	986	33.12%	70	2.35%	14	0.47%	4	0.13%	917	30.80%	2,977
Hardin	837	35.57%	1,463	62.18%	45	1.91%	5	0.21%	3	0.13%	-626	-26.60%	2,353
Hawkins	935	38.01%	1,510	61.38%	0	0.00%	15	0.61%	0	0.00%	-575	-23.37%	2,460
Haywood	1,341	95.24%	64	4.55%	1	0.07%	1	0.07%	1	0.07%	1,277	90.70%	1,408
Henderson	864	38.20%	1,313	58.05%	37	1.64%	37	1.64%	11	0.49%	-449	-19.85%	2,262
Henry	2,365	69.70%	928	27.35%	57	1.68%	38	1.12%	5	0.15%	1,437	42.35%	3,393
Hickman	1,231	55.60%	922	41.64%	48	2.17%	7	0.32%	6	0.27%	309	13.96%	2,214
Houston	555	61.87%	287	32.00%	1	0.11%	27	3.01%	27	3.01%	268	29.88%	897
Humphreys	1,209	67.69%	539	30.18%	8	0.45%	25	1.40%	5	0.28%	670	37.51%	1,786
Jackson	1,222	60.77%	772	38.39%	17	0.85%	0	0.00%	0	0.00%	450	22.38%	2,011
James	222	29.10%	533	69.86%	7	0.92%	1	0.13%	0	0.00%	-311	-40.76%	763
Jefferson	380	23.44%	1,217	75.08%	4	0.25%	18	1.11%	2	0.12%	-837	-51.63%	1,621
Johnson	219	10.96%	1,769	88.49%	0	0.00%	11	0.55%	0	0.00%	-1,550	-77.54%	1,999
Knox	3,196	41.25%	4,309	55.61%	20	0.26%	120	1.55%	103	1.33%	-1,113	-14.36%	7,748
Lake	469	72.83%	174	27.02%	0	0.00%	1	0.16%	0	0.00%	295	45.81%	644
Lauderdale	3,017	94.08%	168	5.24%	16	0.50%	0	0.00%	6	0.19%	2,849	88.84%	3,207
Lawrence	1,299	48.87%	1,359	51.13%	0	0.00%	0	0.00%	0	0.00%	-60	-2.26%	2,658
Lewis	415	63.26%	220	33.54%	0	0.00%	1	0.15%	20	3.05%	195	29.73%	656
Lincoln	2,227	70.72%	631	20.04%	195	6.19%	96	3.05%	0	0.00%	1,596	50.68%	3,149
Loudon	356	30.07%	810	68.41%	8	0.68%	7	0.59%	3	0.25%	-454	-38.34%	1,184
Macon	751	33.22%	1,482	65.55%	28	1.24%	0	0.00%	0	0.00%	-731	-32.33%	2,261
Madison	2,618	65.48%	1,180	29.51%	174	4.35%	5	0.13%	21	0.53%	1,438	35.97%	3,998
Marion	731	36.92%	1,189	60.05%	3	0.15%	18	0.91%	39	1.97%	-458	-23.13%	1,980
Marshall	2,152	73.67%	620	21.23%	128	4.38%	21	0.72%	0	0.00%	1,532	52.45%	2,921
Maury	2,142	66.85%	973	30.37%	41	1.28%	37	1.15%	11	0.34%	1,169	36.49%	3,204
McMinn	1,001	37.42%	1,669	62.39%	5	0.19%	0	0.00%	0	0.00%	-668	-24.97%	2,675
McNairy	1,218	42.50%	1,525	53.21%	121	4.22%	2	0.07%	0	0.00%	-307	-10.71%	2,866
Meigs	563	52.86%	481	45.16%	20	1.88%	1	0.09%	0	0.00%	82	7.70%	1,065
Monroe	1,385	44.19%	1,724	55.01%	1	0.03%	20	0.64%	4	0.13%	-339	-10.82%	3,134
Montgomery	1,697	63.23%	843	31.41%	19	0.71%	121	4.51%	4	0.15%	854	31.82%	2,684
Moore	857	88.26%	95	9.78%	18	1.85%	1	0.10%	0	0.00%	762	78.48%	971
Morgan	387	26.63%	1,049	72.20%	0	0.00%	16	1.10%	1	0.07%	-662	-45.56%	1,453
Obion	2,624	77.18%	756	22.24%	2	0.06%	18	0.53%	0	0.00%	1,868	54.94%	3,400
Overton	1,125	57.93%	817	42.07%	0	0.00%	0	0.00%	0	0.00%	308	15.86%	1,942
Perry	752	56.29%	584	43.71%	0	0.00%	0	0.00%	0	0.00%	168	12.57%	1,336
Pickett	346	40.47%	509	59.53%	0	0.00%	0	0.00%	0	0.00%	-163	-19.06%	855
Polk	688	40.61%	1,006	59.39%	0	0.00%	0	0.00%	0	0.00%	-318	-18.77%	1,694
Putnam	1,310	51.35%	1,213	47.55%	11	0.43%	17	0.67%	0	0.00%	97	3.80%	2,551
Rhea	799	46.24%	881	50.98%	10	0.58%	30	1.74%	8	0.46%	-82	-4.75%	1,728
Roane	493	24.17%	1,378	67.55%	17	0.83%	87	4.26%	65	3.19%	-885	-43.38%	2,040
Robertson	2,308	72.44%	811	25.46%	21	0.66%	43	1.35%	3	0.09%	1,497	46.99%	3,186
Rutherford	2,504	64.39%	1,348	34.66%	26	0.67%	7	0.18%	4	0.10%	1,156	29.72%	3,889
Scott	166	9.56%	1,567	90.26%	0	0.00%	0	0.00%	3	0.17%	-1,401	-80.70%	1,736
Sequatchie	356	66.79%	175	32.83%	0	0.00%	0	0.00%	2	0.38%	181	33.96%	533
Sevier	300	9.40%	2,886	90.44%	0	0.00%	5	0.16%	0	0.00%	-2,586	-81.04%	3,191
Shelby	8,686	75.64%	2,563	22.32%	13	0.11%	25	0.22%	196	1.71%	6,123	53.32%	11,483
Smith	1,562	55.35%	1,080	38.27%	93	3.30%	87	3.08%	0	0.00%	482	17.08%	2,822
Stewart	1,330	65.07%	681	33.32%	0	0.00%	1	0.05%	32	1.57%	649	31.75%	2,044
Sullivan	2,116	57.69%	1,506	41.06%	3	0.08%	41	1.12%	2	0.05%	610	16.63%	3,668
Sumner	2,178	76.64%	599	21.08%	57	2.01%	4	0.14%	4	0.14%	1,579	55.56%	2,842
Tipton	1,882	64.01%	980	33.33%	72	2.45%	4	0.14%	2	0.07%	902	30.68%	2,940
Trousdale	488	71.14%	177	25.80%	21	3.06%	0	0.00%	0	0.00%	311	45.34%	686
Unicoi	74	8.64%	776	90.65%	0	0.00%	6	0.70%	0	0.00%	-702	-82.01%	856
Union	334	19.04%	1,410	80.39%	0	0.00%	10	0.57%	0	0.00%	-1,076	-61.35%	1,754
Van Buren	352	68.75%	160	31.25%	0	0.00%	0	0.00%	0	0.00%	192	37.50%	512
Warren	1,815	69.83%	707	27.20%	29	1.12%	11	0.42%	37	1.42%	1,108	42.63%	2,599
Washington	1,268	36.86%	2,120	61.63%	0	0.00%	48	1.40%	4	0.12%	-852	-24.77%	3,440
Wayne	434	23.21%	1,426	76.26%	1	0.05%	9	0.48%	0	0.00%	-992	-53.05%	1,870
Weakley	2,892	61.58%	1,629	34.69%	130	2.77%	44	0.94%	1	0.02%	1,263	26.90%	4,696
White	1,682	70.82%	679	28.59%	3	0.13%	11	0.46%	0	0.00%	1,003	42.23%	2,375
Williamson	1,932	76.42%	475	18.79%	100	3.96%	20	0.79%	1	0.04%	1,457	57.63%	2,528
Wilson	2,386	70.45%	966	28.52%	12	0.35%	23	0.68%	0	0.00%	1,420	41.93%	3,387
Totals	131,653	54.23%	105,372	43.41%	2,491	1.03%	1,889	0.78%	1,354	0.56%	26,281	10.83%	242,759

== See also ==
- 1904 Tennessee gubernatorial election
- United States presidential elections in Tennessee
