= 1904 Dallas mayoral election =

- April 5, 1905
Candidate	Bryan T. Barry	Unknown
Party	Independent
Popular vote	Unknown	Unknown
Percentage	Unknown	Unknown
Mayor before election
Ben E. Cabell
Elected mayor
Bryan T. Barry

The 1904 Dallas mayoral election was a mayoral election in Dallas, Texas, held alongside municipal elections. The election was held on April 5, 1905. In this election Bryan T. Barry won against an unknown candidate.
