= 1904 Illinois lieutenant gubernatorial election =

- November 8, 1904
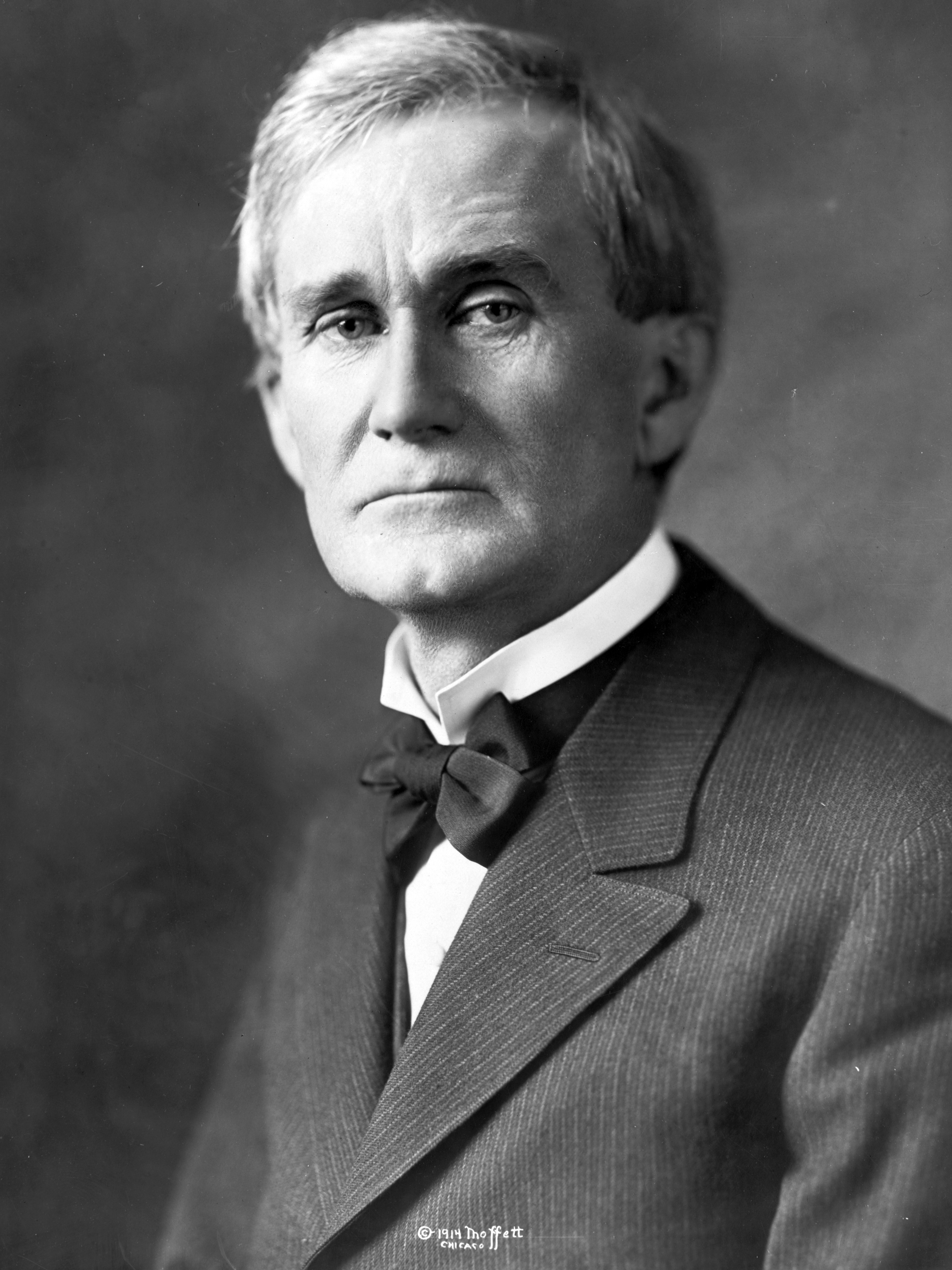

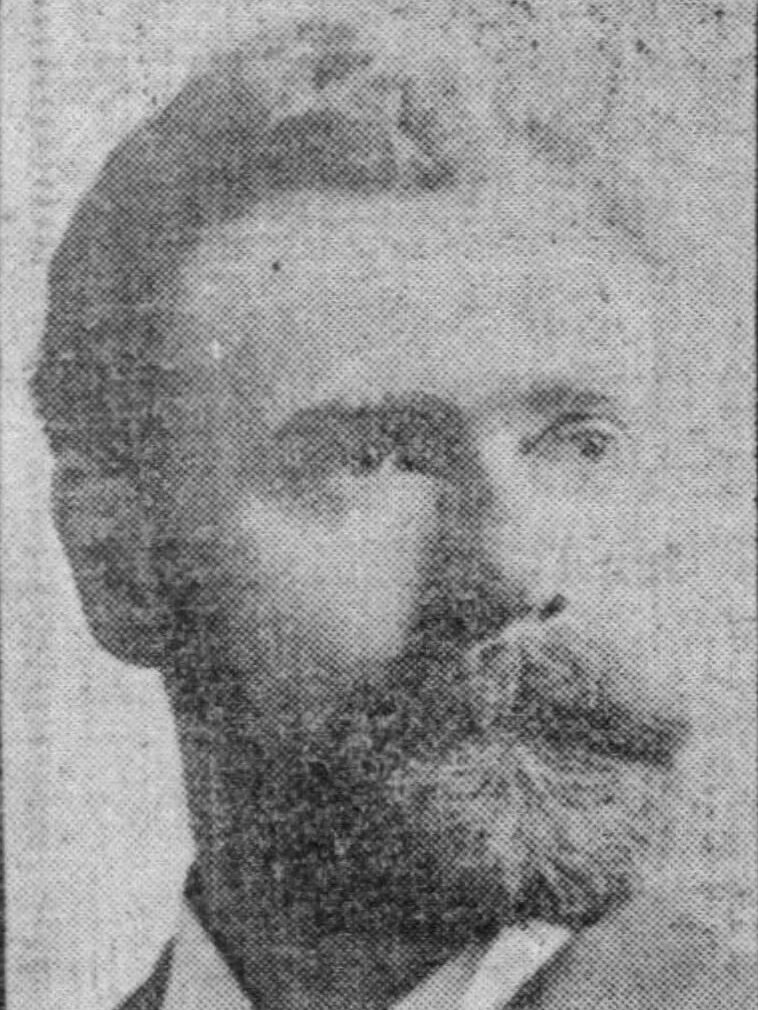

Nominee	Lawrence Y. Sherman	Thomas F. Ferns	James H. Brower
Party	Republican	Democratic	Socialist
Popular vote	628,774	332,134	62,333
Percentage	58.88%	31.10%	5.84%
Lieutenant Governor before election
William Northcott
Republican
Elected Lieutenant Governor
Lawrence Y. Sherman
Republican

The 1904 Illinois lieutenant gubernatorial election was held on November 8, 1904. It saw the election of Republican nominee Lawrence Y. Sherman, who defeated Democratic nominee Thomas F. Ferns and five other candidates.

The Democratic and Republican nominees were chosen by their respective parties' state conventions.

== Democratic nomination ==
=== Candidates ===
- Thomas F. Ferns of Jerseyville, former State Representative

=== Results ===
Democratic lieutenant gubernatorial nomination, 1st ballot
Party	Candidate	Votes	%
Democratic	Thomas F. Ferns	acclaimed	

== Republican nomination ==
=== Candidates ===
- W. J. Conzelman, of Pekin, President of the Peoria Railway Terminal Company (withdrew during ballot)
- Lawrence Y. Sherman of Macomb, State Representative
- Frank L. Smith of Dwight

=== Results ===
Republican lieutenant gubernatorial nomination, 1st ballot
Party	Candidate	Votes	%
Republican	Lawrence Y. Sherman	1,076.5	71.67%
Republican	Frank L. Smith	424.5	28.26%
Republican	W. J. Conzelman	1	0.07%
Total votes		1,502	100.00

Following the ballot, Smith withdrew his name and moved that the nomination of Sherman be made unanimous, which was carried.

== General election ==
Illinois lieutenant gubernatorial election, 1904
Party	Candidate	Votes	%	±%
Republican	Lawrence Y. Sherman	628,774	58.88%	
Democratic	Thomas F. Ferns	332,134	31.10%	
Socialist	James H. Brower	62,333	5.84%	
Prohibition	Marion Gallup	34,768	3.26%	
Populist	William Hess	4,671	0.44%	
Socialist Labor	Carl Koechlin	4,511	0.42%	
Continental Party	William B. Kerney	771	0.07%	
Majority		296,640	27.78%	
Turnout		1,067,962	100.00%	
Republican hold		Swing		

== See also ==
- 1904 Illinois gubernatorial election

== Bibliography ==
- McCan Davis, J. (1904). The breaking of the deadlock. Springfield, Illinois: The Henry O. Shepard Company.
- Compiled by James A. Rose, Secretary of State (1906). Blue Book of the State of Illinois, 1905. Springfield, Illinois: Illinois State Journal Co., State Printers.
- Journal of the Senate of the 44th General Assembly of the State of Illinois. Springfield, Illinois: Illinois State Journal Co., State Printers. 1905.
