= 1904 Missouri lieutenant gubernatorial election =

- November 8, 1904
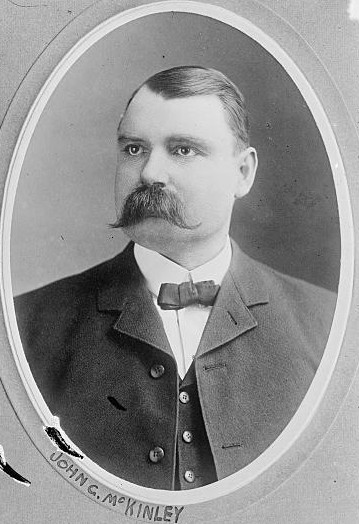

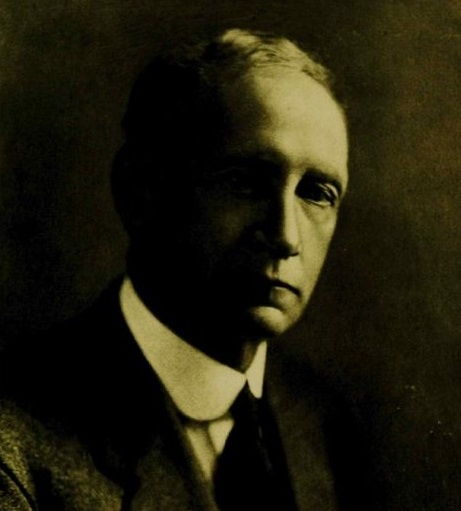
Nominee	John C. McKinley	Thomas Lewis Rubey
Party	Republican	Democratic
Popular vote	314,895	305,895
Percentage	48.84%	47.44%
Lieutenant Governor before election
Thomas Lewis Rubey (Acting)
Democratic
Elected Lieutenant Governor
John C. McKinley
Republican

The 1904 Missouri lieutenant gubernatorial election was held on November 8, 1904, in order to elect the lieutenant governor of Missouri. Republican nominee and incumbent member of the Missouri Senate John C. McKinley defeated Democratic nominee and incumbent acting lieutenant governor Thomas Lewis Rubey, Socialist nominee William Lincoln Garver, Prohibition nominee Andrew T. Osbron, People's nominee Abram E. Nelson and Socialist Labor nominee Theodore Kaucher.

== General election ==
On election day, November 8, 1904, Republican nominee John C. McKinley won the election by a margin of 9,000 votes against his foremost opponent Democratic nominee Thomas Lewis Rubey, thereby gaining Republican control over the office of lieutenant governor. McKinley was sworn in as the 26th lieutenant governor of Missouri on January 9, 1905.

=== Results ===
Missouri lieutenant gubernatorial election, 1904
Party	Candidate	Votes	%
Republican	John C. McKinley	314,895	48.84
Democratic	Thomas Lewis Rubey (incumbent)	305,895	47.44
Socialist	William Lincoln Garver	12,248	1.90
Prohibition	Andrew T. Osbron	6,603	1.02
Populist	Abram E. Nelson	3,601	0.56
Socialist Labor	Theodore Kaucher	1,537	0.24
Total votes		644,779	100.00
Republican gain from Democratic			

== See also ==
- 1904 Missouri gubernatorial election
