= 1904 United States elections =

- ← 1902 1903 1904 1905 1906 → Presidential election year
- Election day: November 8
- Incumbent president: ▌Theodore Roosevelt (R)
- Next Congress: 59th

Presidential election
- Partisan control: Republican hold
- Popular vote margin: Republican +18.8%
- Electoral vote
- Theodore Roosevelt (R): 336
- Alton Parker (D): 140
- 1904 presidential election results. Red denotes states won by Roosevelt, blue denotes states won by Parker. Numbers indicate the electoral votes won by each candidate.

Senate elections
- Overall control: Republican hold
- Seats contested: 30 of 90 seats
- Net seat change: Democratic -1
- Results of the elections: Democratic gain Democratic hold Republican gain Republican hold Legislature failed to elect

House elections
- Overall control: Republican hold
- Seats contested: All 386 voting members
- Net seat change: Republican +45

Gubernatorial elections
- Seats contested: 33
- Net seat change: Democratic +2
- 1904 gubernatorial election results Democratic gain Democratic hold Republican gain Republican hold

Elections were held for the 59th United States Congress. It occurred during the Fourth Party System. The Republicans maintained control of the presidency and both houses of Congress. For the first time since the 1828 election, no third party or independent won a seat in Congress.

In the presidential election, the Republican President Theodore Roosevelt defeated the Democratic judge Alton B. Parker from New York. Parker, a conservative Bourbon Democrat, won the Democratic nomination on the first ballot, as former President Grover Cleveland and former presidential nominee William Jennings Bryan both declined to run. Roosevelt dominated both the popular vote and the electoral college, carrying every state outside the Southern United States. Roosevelt, who succeeded William McKinley after the latter was assassinated in 1901, became the first vice president to succeed to the presidency and later win election to the presidency in his own right. The election also saw Florida holding the first presidential primary, although Florida delegates were not bound by the results of the primary.

Republicans won major gains in the House, boosting their majority.

In the Senate, the Republicans picked up one seat, and maintained a commanding majority.

== See also ==
- 1904 United States presidential election
- 1904 United States House of Representatives elections
- 1904–05 United States Senate elections
- 1904 United States gubernatorial elections
