= January 1904 Maltese general election =

General elections were held in Malta on 14 January 1904. Following the elections, all elected members immediately resigned in protest against the 1903 "Chamberlain" Constitution, forcing fresh elections to be held in February.

== Background ==
The elections were the first held under the Chamberlain Constitution. The number of members elected from single-member constituencies was reduced from ten to eight.

District	Towns
I	Valletta East
II	Valletta West, Msida, Sliema, St. Julian's
III	Floriana, Pietà, Ħamrun, Qormi, Żebbuġ
IV	Cospicua, Birgu, Kalkara, Żabbar, Marsaskala
V	Senglea, New Village, Luqa, Gudja, Għaxaq, Żejtun, Marsaxlokk, Saint George's Bay and Birżebbuġa
VI	Birkirkara, Balzan, Lija, Attard, Għargħur, Naxxar, Mosta, Mellieħa
VII	Mdina, Rabat, Siġġiewi, Dingli, Qrendi, Mqabba, Żurrieq, Bubaqra, Safi, Kirkop
VIII	Gozo and Comino
Source: Schiavone, p17

== Results ==
A total of 7,991 people were registered to vote, but no votes were cast as all candidates were unopposed.

Constituency	Name	Votes	Notes
I	Andrè Pullicino	–	Re-elected
II	Paolo Sammut	–	Re-elected (previously from the Chamber of Commerce seat)
III	Cikku Azzopardi	–	Re-elected
IV	Beniamino Bonnici	–	Re-elected (previously from the Graduates seat)
V	Salvatore Cachia Zammit	–	Re-elected (previously from constituency IX)
VI	Fransesco Wettinger	–	Re-elected (previously from constituency VII
VII	Alfred Micallef	–	Re-elected (previously from landowners and nobility seat)
VIII	Fortunato Mizzi	–	Re-elected (previously from constituency X)
Source: Schiavone, p181
