= 1907 Maltese general election =

General elections were held in Malta on 20 May 1907. All candidates were elected unopposed.

== Background ==
The elections were held under the Chamberlain Constitution, with members elected from eight single-member constituencies.

District	Towns
I	Valletta East
II	Valletta West, Msida, Sliema, St. Julian's
III	Floriana, Pietà, Ħamrun, Qormi, Żebbuġ
IV	Cospicua, Birgu, Kalkara, Żabbar, Marsaskala
V	Senglea, New Village, Luqa, Gudja, Għaxaq, Żejtun, Marsaxlokk, Saint George's Bay and Birżebbuġa
VI	Birkirkara, Balzan, Lija, Attard, Għargħur, Naxxar, Mosta, Mellieħa
VII	Mdina, Rabat, Siġġiewi, Dingli, Qrendi, Mqabba, Żurrieq, Bubaqra, Safi, Kirkop
VIII	Gozo and Comino
Source: Schiavone, p17

== Results ==
A total of 7,091 people were registered to vote, but no votes were cast as all candidates were unopposed.

Constituency	Name	Votes	Notes
I	Andrè Pullicino	–	Re-elected
II	Paolo Sammut	–	Re-elected
III	Cikku Azzopardi	–	Re-elected
IV	Beniamino Bonnici	–	Re-elected
V	Salvatore Cachia Zammit	–	Re-elected
VI	Alfredo Mattei	–	
VII	Alfred Micallef	–	Re-elected
VIII	Artuto Mercieca	–	
Source: Schiavone, p181
