= Charles C. Black =

American judge

Charles Clarke Black (July 29, 1858 – December 23, 1947) was an American jurist and Democratic party politician from New Jersey. He was an Associate Justice of the New Jersey Supreme Court and was the Democratic nominee for Governor of New Jersey in 1904.

Black was born in Mount Holly Township, New Jersey in 1858 to John and Mary Anna (Clarke) Black. He attended Princeton University, graduating in 1878. At Princeton he was a roommate of Woodrow Wilson, who graduated one year after him. He received a law degree from University of Michigan Law School in 1881 and was admitted to the New Jersey bar the same year. He practiced law in Jersey City.

Black was appointed to the New Jersey State Tax Board in 1891 and served on the Equal Tax Commissions of 1896 and 1904. Running on an "equal tax" platform, he was nominated for Governor of New Jersey at the Democratic State Convention of 1904. In the general election he faced the Republican nominee Edward C. Stokes. Stokes also favored equal taxation of railroads and other property, and he ultimately defeated Black by a margin of more than 50,000 votes.

Black continued to serve on the State Tax Board until 1908, when he was appointed by Governor John Franklin Fort to be a Circuit Court Judge. In 1914 Governor James Fairman Fielder nominated him to be a justice of the New Jersey Supreme Court. He served on the Supreme Court until 1939, and after retiring resumed his Jersey City law practice.

In 1947 he died of a heart attack in Jersey City at the age of 89.

Party political offices
Preceded by James M. Seymour	Democratic Nominee for Governor of New Jersey; 1904	Succeeded by Frank S. Katzenbach
