= Henry A. Lathrop =

American physician and politician (1848–1911)

Henry Allison Lathrop (September 24, 1848 – April 23, 1911) was an American physician and politician.

Born in Bedford, Ohio, Lathrop went to Oberlin College in Oberlin, Ohio and then received his medical degree from Hahnemann Medical College, in Chicago, Illinois. Lathrop moved to Marshfield, Wisconsin and practiced medicine in 1881. In 1887, Lathrop served in the Wisconsin State Assembly and was a Republican. Lathrop died in Marshfield, Wisconsin from a stroke.
