= February 1904 Maltese general election =

Early general elections were held in Malta on 24 February 1904, after all the candidates elected in January resigned immediately after the elections in protest against the 1903 "Chamberlain" Constitution. All eight candidates were again unopposed and all resigned immediately after the elections, forcing further elections in April.

== Background ==
The elections were held under the Chamberlain Constitution, with members elected from eight single-member constituencies.

| District | Towns |
|---|---|
| I | Valletta East |
| II | Valletta West, Msida, Sliema, St. Julian's |
| III | Floriana, Pietà, Ħamrun, Qormi, Żebbuġ |
| IV | Cospicua, Birgu, Kalkara, Żabbar, Marsaskala |
| V | Senglea, New Village, Luqa, Gudja, Għaxaq, Żejtun, Marsaxlokk, Saint George's Bay and Birżebbuġa |
| VI | Birkirkara, Balzan, Lija, Attard, Għargħur, Naxxar, Mosta, Mellieħa |
| VII | Mdina, Rabat, Siġġiewi, Dingli, Qrendi, Mqabba, Żurrieq, Bubaqra, Safi, Kirkop |
| VIII | Gozo and Comino |
Source: Schiavone, p17

== Results ==
A total of 7,991 people were registered to vote, but no votes were cast as all candidates were unopposed.

| Constituency | Name | Votes | Notes |
|---|---|---|---|
| I | Andrè Pullicino | – | Re-elected |
| II | Paolo Sammut | – | Re-elected |
| III | Cikku Azzopardi | – | Re-elected |
| IV | Beniamino Bonnici | – | Re-elected |
| V | Salvatore Cachia Zammit | – | Re-elected |
| VI | Fransesco Wettinger | – | Re-elected |
| VII | Alfred Micallef | – | Re-elected |
| VIII | Fortunato Mizzi | – | Re-elected |
Source: Schiavone, p181
