= Lawrence B. Stringer =

American politician

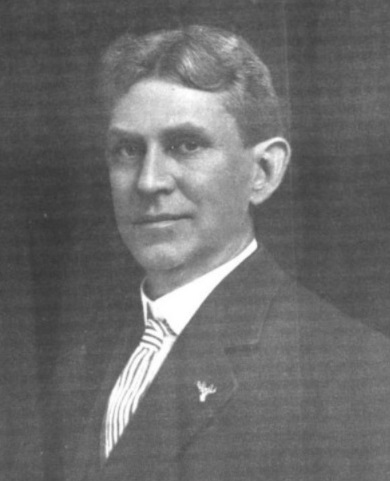
- From Volume I (1911) of History of Logan County, Illinois

Member of the U.S. House of Representatives from Illinois's at-large district
- In office March 4, 1913 – March 3, 1915
- Preceded by: District created
- Succeeded by: Burnett M. Chiperfield

Member of the Illinois Senate
- In office 1900-1904

Personal details
- Born: February 24, 1866 Atlantic City, New Jersey, U.S.
- Died: December 5, 1942 (aged 76) Lincoln, Illinois, U.S.
- Party: Democratic

Lawrence Beaumont Stringer (February 24, 1866 – December 5, 1942) was a U.S. Representative from Illinois.

Born near Atlantic City, New Jersey, Stringer moved with his parents to Lincoln, Illinois, in 1876. He attended the public schools. He was graduated from Lincoln University (later Lincoln College) in 1887. Reporter on a local paper. He served as member of the State house of representatives 1890-1892. He entered the Chicago College of Law (law department of Lake Forest University), and was graduated in 1896. He returned to Lincoln, Illinois, in 1898 and commenced practice. He served as delegate to the Democratic State convention in 1900 and served as chairman. He served as member of the State senate 1900-1904. He was an unsuccessful Democratic candidate for Governor of Illinois in 1904. He was appointed chief justice of the Illinois State Court of Claims in 1905 and served until 1913. He was an unsuccessful candidate for the Democratic nomination for United States Senator in 1908.

Stringer was elected as a Democrat to the Sixty-third Congress (March 4, 1913 – March 3, 1915). He did not seek renomination in 1914, but was an unsuccessful candidate for United States Senator in that year's election. He resumed the practice of law. He was an unsuccessful candidate for justice of the supreme court of Illinois in 1924.

Stringer was elected judge of Logan County in 1918 and served until his death in Lincoln, Illinois on December 5, 1942. He was interred in Union Cemetery.

Party political offices
Preceded by Samuel Alschuler	Democratic nominee for Governor of Illinois; 1904	Succeeded by Adlai Stevenson I
U.S. House of Representatives
Preceded by New seat	Member of the U.S. House of Representatives from Illinois's at-large congressional district March 4, 1913 – March 3, 1915	Succeeded by Burnett M. Chiperfield
