= 1904 Illinois gubernatorial election =

- November 8, 1904
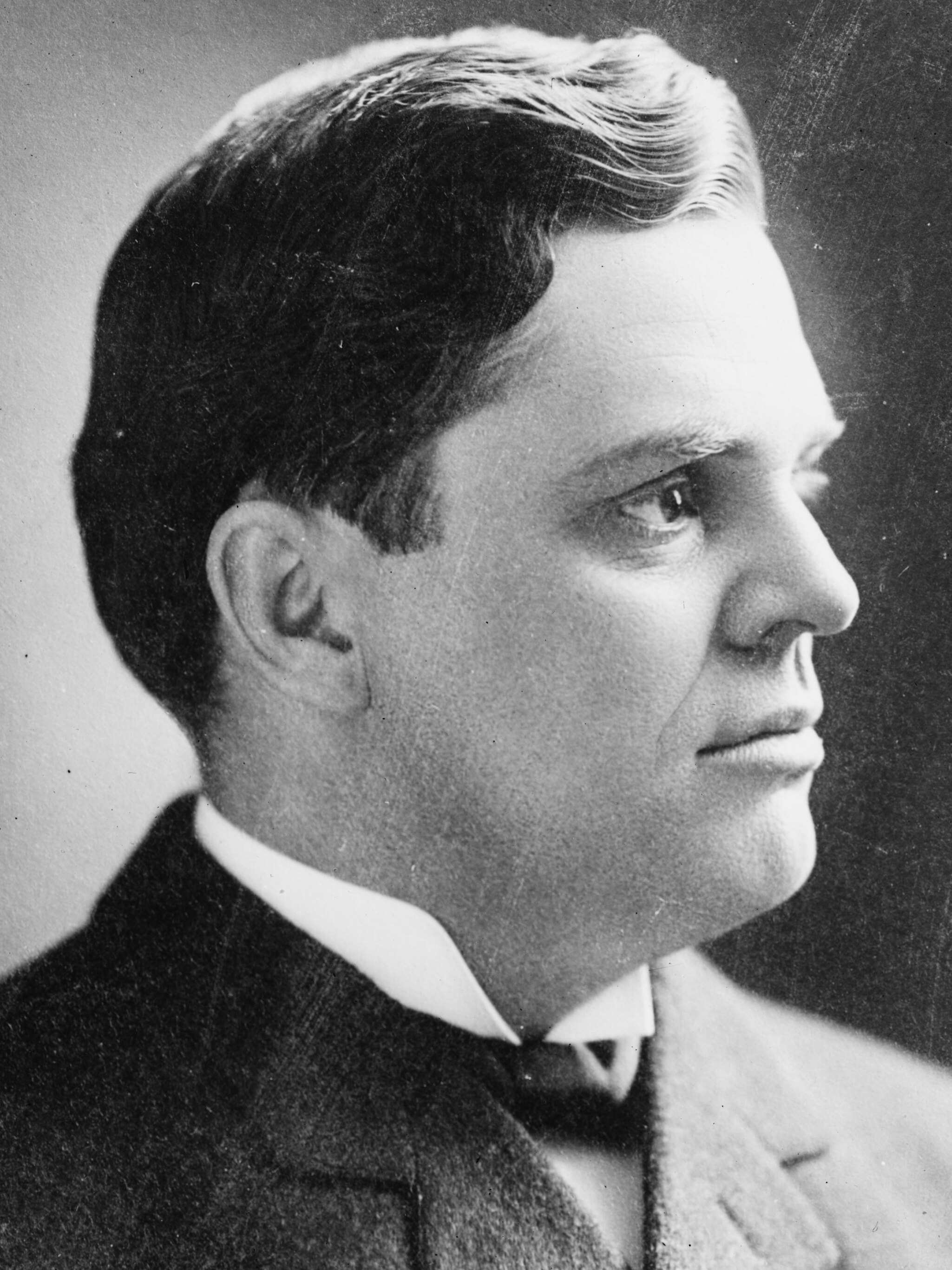

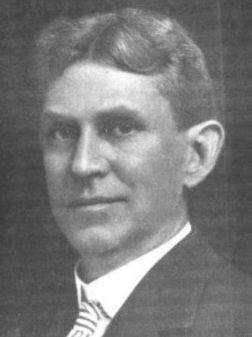

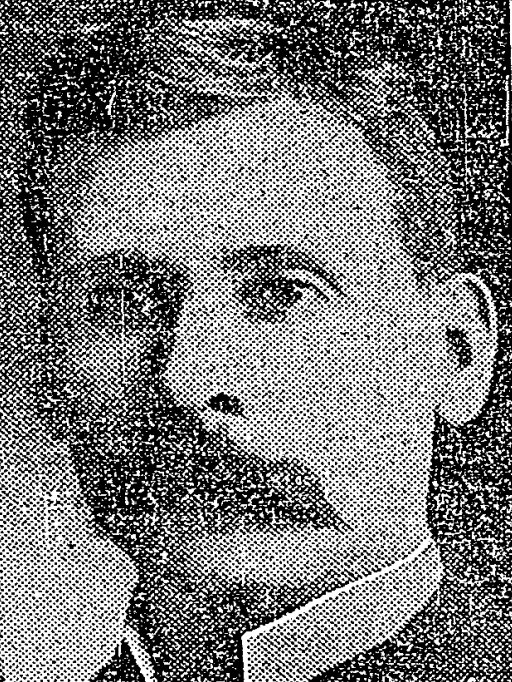
Nominee	Charles S. Deneen	Lawrence B. Stringer	John Collins
Party	Republican	Democratic	Socialist
Popular vote	634,029	334,880	59,062
Percentage	59.09%	31.21%	5.51%
- County results Deneen: 40–50% 50–60% 60–70% 70–80% 80–90% Stringer: 40–50% 50–60%
Governor before election
Richard Yates Jr.
Republican
Elected Governor
Charles S. Deneen
Republican

The 1904 Illinois gubernatorial election was held on November 8, 1904. Republican incumbent Richard Yates Jr. ran for re-election to a second term in office but lost the Republican nomination to Charles S. Deneen after a lengthy convention over the course of nearly one month. In the general election, Deneen defeated state senator Lawrence B. Stringer and Socialist candidate John Collins.

== Republican nomination ==
=== Candidates ===
- Charles S. Deneen, Cook County State's attorney and former state representative from Chicago
- Frank O. Lowden, former Northwestern University law professor
- Vespasian Warner of Clinton, U.S. Representative for the 19th district

==== Withdrawn at convention ====
- John H. Pierce, Kewanee businessman and president of the Western Tube Company (nominated before 3rd ballot; withdrew after 78th ballot)
- Howland J. Hamlin, Illinois attorney general (withdrew after 78th ballot)
- Lawrence Y. Sherman, state representative from Macomb (withdrew after 49th ballot; returned for 57th ballot; withdrew after 78th ballot)
- Richard Yates Jr., incumbent governor since 1901 (withdrew after 78th ballot)

=== Results ===
The Republican state convention was held from May 12 to 20 and, following a recess, from May 31 to June 3, 1904, at the State Armory in Springfield.

The results of the balloting were as follows:

1904 Illinois Republican convention (first through twentieth ballots)
	1st	2nd	3rd	4th	5th	6th	7th	8th	9th	10th	11th	12th	13th	14th	15th	16th	17th	18th	19th	20th
Yates	507	504	499	490	491	493	494	488	494	489	489	489	488	482	495	472	485	483	491	486
Lowden	354	390	396	405	408	404	407	403	405	407	401	404	401	420	405	428	407	412	405	397
Deneen	386	383	380	383	380	383	377	382	382	379	376	380	382	381	381	381	379	379	376	383
Hamlin	121	117	111	112	111	112	110	112	111	114	118	117	111	110	111	110	109	118	119	109
Warner	45	42	34	36	34	34	39	44	36	38	38	39	45	36	36	38	35	36	37	51
Sherman	87	63	57	51	56	54	52	50	51	52	52	51	53	50	51	51	51	50	50	51
Pierce	0	0	21	21	21	21	21	21	22	22	21	21	21	21	21	21	34	22	21	21
Rodenberg	0	0	0	0	0	0	0	0	0	0	6	0	0	0	0	0	0	0	0	0

1904 Illinois Republican convention (21st through 38th ballots)
	21st	22nd	23rd	24th	25th	26th	27th	28th	29th	30th	31st	32nd	33rd	34th	35th	36th	37th	38th
Yates	486	486	483	486	489	483	482	482	481	437	431	429	428	431	483	492	487	490
Lowden	409	401	393	398	407	402	407	400	404	452	473	473	467	466	408	390	395	393
Deneen	381	386	369	375	381	385	388	393	382	382	383	383	387	389	391	398	445	441
Hamlin	108	110	148	135	111	111	110	110	115	111	107	109	111	111	109	111	109	113
Warner	42	44	35	36	39	39	39	40	38	44	32	33	34	32	38	37	37	37
Sherman	51	51	50	49	50	51	51	51	56	51	50	49	49	50	49	51	6	2
Pierce	21	21	21	21	21	26	21	22	22	21	22	22	22	22	23	22	22	25
Cannon	0	0	0	0	0	1	0	0	0	0	0	0	0	0	0	0	0	0

1904 Illinois Republican convention (39th through 58th ballots)
	39th	40th	41st	42nd	43rd	44th	45th	46th	47th	48th	49th	50th	51st	52nd	53rd	54th	55th	56th	57th	58th
Yates	483	482	484	482	479	478	480	482	482	486	487	486	483	483	483	481	483	482	483	483
Lowden	396.5	396.5	399.5	400.5	396.5	402.5	403.5	404.5	403.5	397.5	399.5	399.5	393.5	393.5	393.5	392.5	393.5	393.5	393.5	392.5
Deneen	442.5	440.5	433.5	433.5	435.5	436.5	435.5	433.5	432.5	432.5	391.5	431.5	429.5	429.5	430.5	429.5	430.5	429.5	388.5	385.5
Hamlin	112	111	111	111	116	113	111	112	111	112	111	113	112	111	110	111	110	110	109	113
Warner	36	40	41	41	39	39	39	37	38	41	39	40	50	52	53	55	52	54	54	53
Sherman	2	2	2	2	2	2	2	2	2	2	42	0	0	0	0	0	0	0	43	46
Pierce	30	30	31	32	32	31	31	31	33	31	32	32	33	33	32	33	33	33	31	29
Reeves	0	0	0	0	2	0	0	0	0	0	0	0	0	0	0	0	0	0	0	0
Raymond	0	0	0	0	0	0	0	0	0	0	0	0	1	0	0	0	0	0	0	0

1904 Illinois Republican convention (59th through 79th ballots)
	59th	60th	61st	62nd	63rd	64th	65th	66th	67th	68th	69th	70th	71st	72nd	73rd	74th	75th	76th	77th	78th	79th
Yates	487	484	484	470	465	474	473	474	471	464	388	381	380	363	362	369	373	386	399	405	1
Lowden	396.5	398.5	398.5	404.5	401.5	407.5	414.5	411.5	408.5	400.5	573.5	601.5	604.5	614.5	631.5	620.5	599.5	581.5	537.5	532.5	522.5
Deneen	383.5	383.5	384.5	391.5	393.5	385.5	381.5	384.5	386.5	370.5	358.5	351.5	347.5	347.5	345.5	345.5	355.5	364.5	364.5	365.5	957.5
Hamlin	116	113	116	116	121	116	117	119	118	107	87	74	76	83	70	74	81	78	104	102	0
Warner	41	42	40	40	43	39	37	36	39	42	28	27	29	30	29	28	28	27	28	28	21
Sherman	50	53	51	52	51	52	52	51	53	80	44	43	41	40	40	41	42	43	45	45	0
Pierce	28	28	28	28	27	28	27	26	26	38	23	24	24	24	24	24	23	22	24	24	0

Following the 79th ballot, Lowden moved that the nomination of Deneen be made unanimous, which was carried viva voce.

== Democratic nomination ==
=== Candidates ===
- Lawrence B. Stringer, state senator from Lincoln

=== Results ===
The Democratic state convention was held on June 15, 1904, at the State Armory in Springfield. Stringer was nominated by acclamation.

== General election ==
=== Candidates ===
- Lawrence B. Stringer, state senator from Lincoln (Democratic)
- Charles S. Deneen, Cook County State's attorney and former state representative from Chicago (Republican)
- John Collins, candidate for mayor of Chicago in 1901 (Socialist)
- James Hogan, candidate for U.S. representative in 1898 (Populist)
- Robert H. Patton, candidate for U.S. representative in 1890 (Prohibition)
- Andrew G. Specht (Continental)
- Philip Veal, party organizer (Socialist Labor)

=== Results ===
Illinois gubernatorial election, 1904
Party	Candidate	Votes	%	±%
Republican	Charles S. Deneen	634,029	59.09%	
Democratic	Lawrence B. Stringer	334,880	31.21%	
Socialist	John Collins	59,062	5.51%	
Prohibition	Robert H. Patton	35,440	3.30%	
Socialist Labor	Philip Veal	4,379	0.41%	
Populist	James Hogan	4,364	0.41%	
Continental Party	Andrew G. Specht	780	0.07%	
Majority		299,149	27.88%	
Turnout		1,072,934	100.00%	
Republican hold		Swing		

== See also ==
- 1904 Illinois lieutenant gubernatorial election

== Bibliography ==
- McCan Davis, J. (1904). The breaking of the deadlock. Springfield, Illinois: The Henry O. Shepard Company.
- Compiled by James A. Rose, Secretary of State (1906). Blue Book of the State of Illinois, 1905. Springfield, Illinois: Illinois State Journal Co., State Printers.
- Journal of the Senate of the 44th General Assembly of the State of Illinois. Springfield, Illinois: Illinois State Journal Co., State Printers. 1905.
