= 1904 New Jersey gubernatorial election =

- November 8, 1904
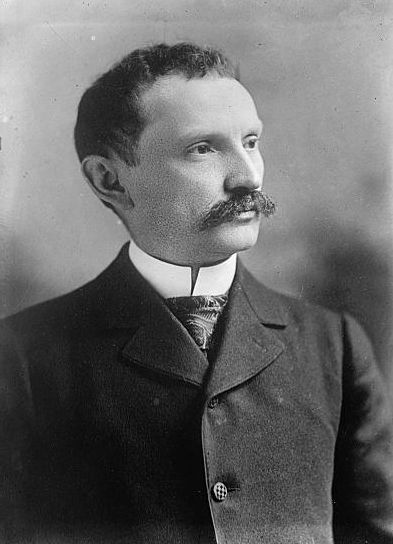

Nominee	Edward C. Stokes	Charles C. Black
Party	Republican	Democratic
Popular vote	231,363	179,719
Percentage	53.50%	41.56%
- County results Stokes: 50–60% 60–70% Black: 50–60%
Governor before election
Franklin Murphy
Republican
Elected Governor
Edward C. Stokes
Republican

The 1904 New Jersey gubernatorial election was held on November 8, 1904. Republican nominee Edward C. Stokes defeated Democratic nominee Charles C. Black with 53.50% of the vote.

== Republican nomination ==
=== Candidates ===
- Edward C. Stokes, former State Senator for Cumberland County and candidate for U.S. Senator in 1902

=== Convention ===
At the state party convention in Trenton on September 20, no opponent emerged to Senator Edward Stokes, and he was nominated enthusiastically without opposition.

== Democratic nomination ==
=== Candidates ===
- Charles C. Black, member of the State Tax Board
- Thomas M. Ferrell, former U.S. Representative from Glassboro
- Frank S. Katzenbach, mayor of Trenton

==== Not nominated ====
- Alvah A. Clark, former U.S. Representative from Somerville
- James van Cleef, mayor of New Brunswick
- Johnston Cornish, State Senator for Warren County
- David S. Crater, Monmouth County Surrogate

=== Convention ===
Various county parties promoted their favorite sons for the nomination, though the front-runner from the start was Charles C. Black, the candidate of Hudson County. Black had the support of Senator James Smith Jr., Robert Davis, and Allan McDermott. Black, a member of the State Tax Board, was also seen as a leading representative of the Democratic campaign for an equal tax.

Ultimately, only two favorite son candidates were nominated against Black: Frank S. Katzenbach of Mercer County and Thomas M. Ferrell of Gloucester. They were soundly defeated at the party convention on September 15 in Trenton.

1904 Democratic state convention
Party	Candidate	Votes	%
Democratic	Charles C. Black	945	88.32%
Democratic	Thomas M. Ferrell	75	7.01%
Democratic	Frank S. Katzenbach	50	4.67%
Total votes		1,070	100.00%

== General election ==
=== Candidates ===
- Charles C. Black, member of the State Tax Board (Democratic)
- George P. Herrschaft (Socialist Labor)
- George A. Honnecker (Populist)
- Henry R. Kearns (Socialist)
- James Parker (Prohibition)
- Edward C. Stokes, former State Senator for Cumberland County and candidate for U.S. Senator in 1902 (Republican)

=== Results ===
New Jersey gubernatorial election, 1904
Party	Candidate	Votes	%	±%
Republican	Edward C. Stokes	231,363	53.50%	▲2.62
Democratic	Charles C. Black	179,719	41.56%	▼4.58
Socialist	Henry R. Kearns	8,858	2.05%	▲1.08
Prohibition	James Parker	6,687	1.55%	▲0.06
Populist	George A. Honnecker	3,285	0.76%	N/A
Socialist Labor	George P. Herrschaft	2,526	0.58%	▲0.05
Majority				
Total votes		432,438	100.00%	
Republican hold		Swing		
