= 1904 Georgia gubernatorial election =

- October 5, 1904
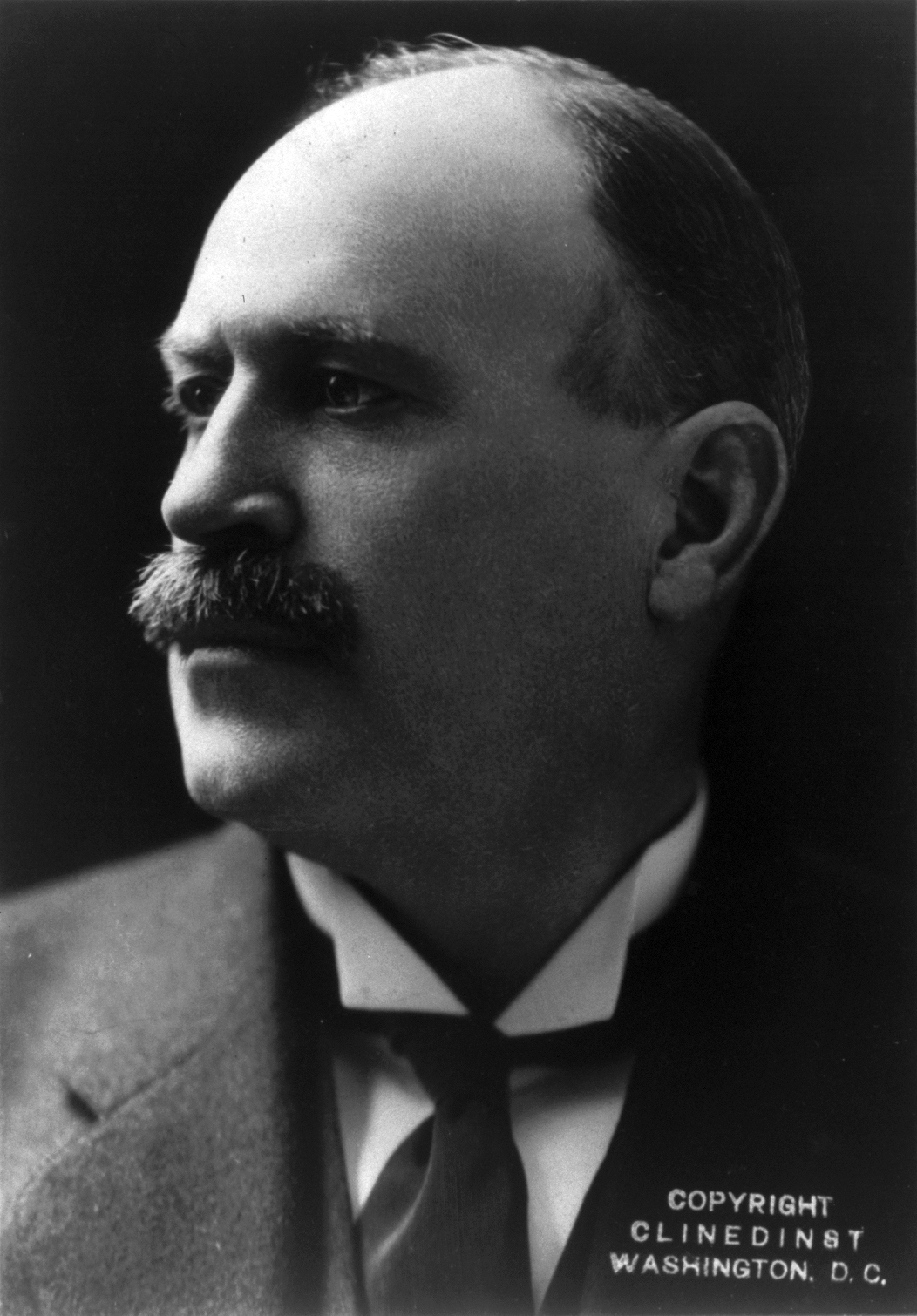
Nominee	Joseph M. Terrell
Party	Democratic
Popular vote	67,523
Percentage	100.00%
- County results Terrell: >90%
Governor before election
Joseph M. Terrell
Democratic
Elected Governor
Joseph M. Terrell
Democratic

The 1904 Georgia gubernatorial election was held on October 5, 1904, in order to elect the Governor of Georgia. Democratic nominee and incumbent Governor Joseph M. Terrell ran unopposed and thus won re-election.

== General election ==
On election day, October 5, 1904, Democratic nominee Joseph M. Terrell won re-election with 100.00% of the vote, thereby holding Democratic control over the office of Governor. Terrell was sworn in for his second term on October 25, 1904.

=== Results ===
Georgia gubernatorial election, 1904
Party	Candidate	Votes	%
Democratic	Joseph M. Terrell (incumbent)	67,523	100.00
Total votes		67,523	100.00
Democratic hold			
