= James B. Frazier =

American politician

James Beriah Frazier
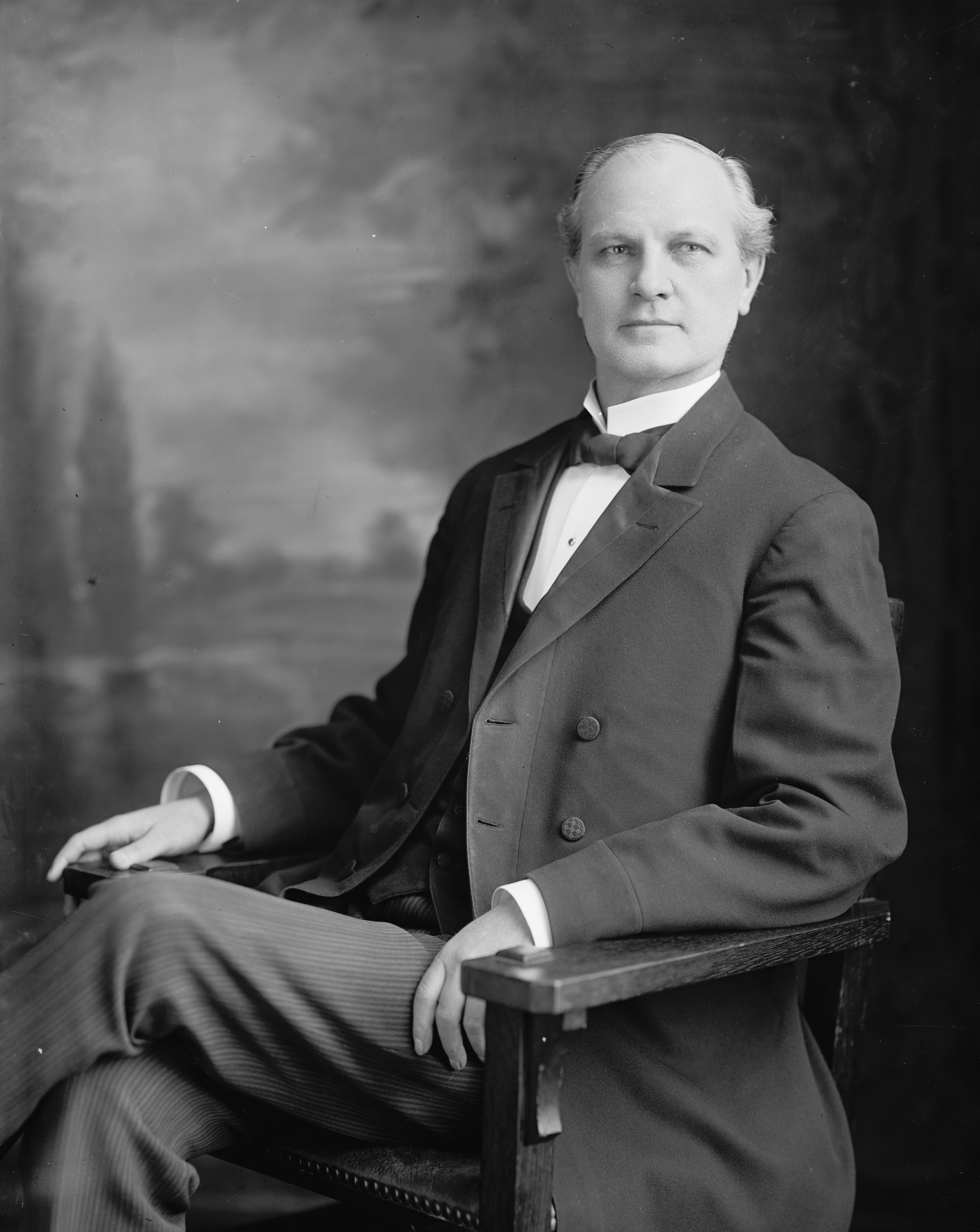
- Photograph by Harris & Ewing, c. 1905-1937

United States Senator from Tennessee
- In office March 21, 1905 – March 3, 1911
- Preceded by: William B. Bate
- Succeeded by: Luke Lea

28th Governor of Tennessee
- In office January 19, 1903 – March 21, 1905
- Preceded by: Benton McMillin
- Succeeded by: John I. Cox

Personal details
- Born: James Beriah Frazier; October 18, 1856 Pikeville, Tennessee, U.S.
- Died: March 28, 1937 (aged 80) Chattanooga, Tennessee, U.S.
- Resting place: Forest Hills Cemetery, Chattanooga, Tennessee
- Party: Democratic
- Spouse: Louise Keith (m. 1883)
- Children: 4 (including James B. Frazier Jr.)
- Education: University of Tennessee (BA, 1878)
- Profession: Attorney

James Beriah Frazier (October 18, 1856 – March 28, 1937) was an American politician who served as the 28th governor of Tennessee from 1903 to 1905, and subsequently as a United States senator from Tennessee from 1905 to 1911. As governor, he reduced the state's debt and enacted mine safety regulations. He also attempted to control whitecapping.

The controversial manner in which the state legislature elected him to the U.S. Senate (Note: The passage of the Seventeenth Amendment to the United States Constitution in 1913 provided for the election of senators by popular vote.) created a critical rift in the state's Democratic Party that lasted into the 1910s.

== Early life ==
Frazier was born in Pikeville, Tennessee, the son of Thomas and Margaret (McReynolds) Frazier. In 1867, his family moved to Davidson County, where his father had been appointed to a criminal court judgeship. Frazier attended Franklin College, a seminary near Nashville, and obtained his Bachelor of Arts degree from the University of Tennessee in 1878. He studied law, was admitted to the bar in 1881, and moved to Chattanooga to practice law.

Described by historian Zella Armstrong as "one of the greatest orators who ever lived in the Volunteer State," Frazier quickly rose to prominence in Chattanooga political circles. In 1894, he challenged incumbent Henry Snodgrass for the Democratic nomination for the 3rd District seat in the U.S. House of Representatives. While Frazier had wide support, Snodgrass had more support from the delegates at the party's convention, and won the nomination. Snodgrass was defeated by the Republican candidate, Foster V. Brown, in the general election, due in part to bitterness from Frazier's supporters who did not support Snodgrass.

During the 1900 presidential race, Frazier served as the state's at-large elector for the Democratic candidate, William Jennings Bryan. He canvassed across Tennessee on behalf of Bryan, gaining invaluable statewide political exposure.

== Governor ==
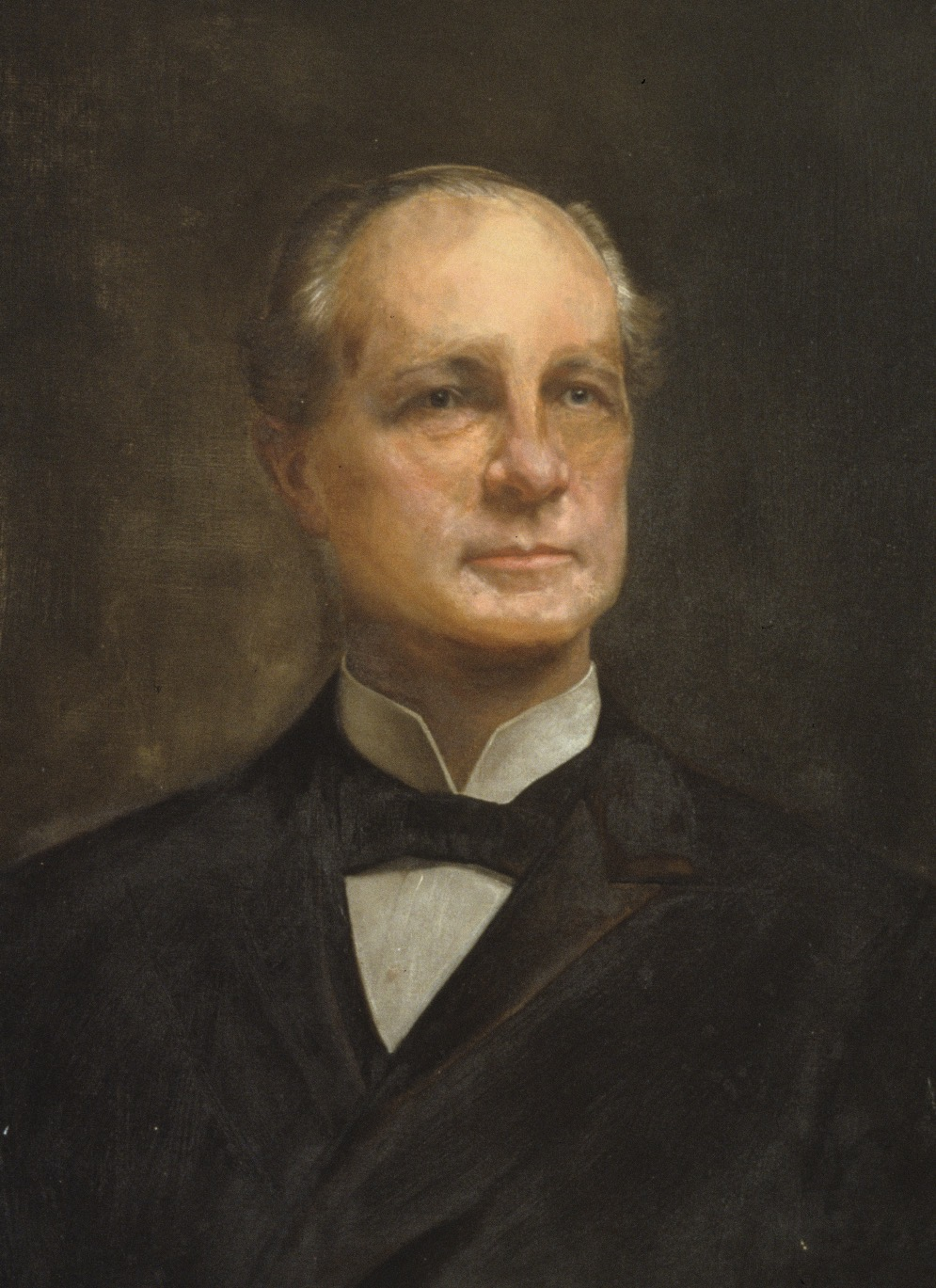
Portrait of Frazier by Lloyd Branson

In 1902, Frazier was the Democratic nominee for governor in the race to succeed Benton McMillin, who was not seeking reelection. His Republican opponent was Judge H. Tyler Campbell, who had won his party's nomination with the support of party boss Representative Walter P. Brownlow. The 1902 gubernatorial campaign is remembered as the last in which the candidates canvassed the state via horse-drawn carriages. In the general election, which was marked by low turnout, Frazier won easily with 98,902 votes to 59,007 for Campbell, and 2,193 for Prohibition candidate R. S. Cheves. Democrats were the majority party in the state at the time, and benefitted by the low turnout.

Frazier sought to bring a business-like atmosphere to the state government, and demanded every department exercise frugality. He vetoed any bill that failed to meet his economic standards, including one that would have raised his own salary. The state had no floating debt during his tenure, and paid off over $600,000 of bonded debt.

Frazier considered public education a priority during his first term. One of the first pieces of legislation he signed was the Romine Bill, which stipulated that any unappropriated funds in the treasury be added to the public school fund. In 1904 alone, this generated more than $270,000 for the state's public schools.

In 1903, Frazier signed the Adams Law, a pro-temperance measure sponsored by the Anti-Saloon League. The law extended the state's "Four Mile Law"– which banned the sale of liquor within 4 miles (6.4 km) of a school– to all towns with populations of 5,000 or fewer people (the Four Mile Law originally applied only to rural areas). This effectively banned the sale of liquor in all but the state's largest cities.

By 1903 whitecapping had become a problem in Tennessee and other southern states. Leaders feared this secret vigilante group was driving off both merchants and workers. When two African-American men were murdered in Needmore, a community in Marshall County, in August 1903, Frazier offered a reward for information, as the men's lynching deaths were attributed to Whitecaps.

In February 1904, a coal miners' strike in the Coal Creek Valley threatened to erupt into a full-blown uprising, raising fears of a revival of the Coal Creek War, which had plagued the valley in the previous decade. Frazier traveled to the valley to meet with the miners, and managed to defuse the situation. Frazier also signed into law new mine safety standards in response to a string of mining accidents in previous years, most notably the Fraterville Mine disaster of 1902.

In the gubernatorial campaign of 1904, Republicans nominated Winchester mayor Jesse Littleton to challenge Frazier. In September, Frazier and Littleton engaged in a series of fierce debates, primarily over the Four Mile Law, which Littleton argued should extend to the entire state, while Frazier, not wanting to further agitate liquor interests, argued that larger cities should remain exempt. On election day, Frazier won easily, capturing 131,503 votes to 103,409 for Littleton.

== Senator and later life ==
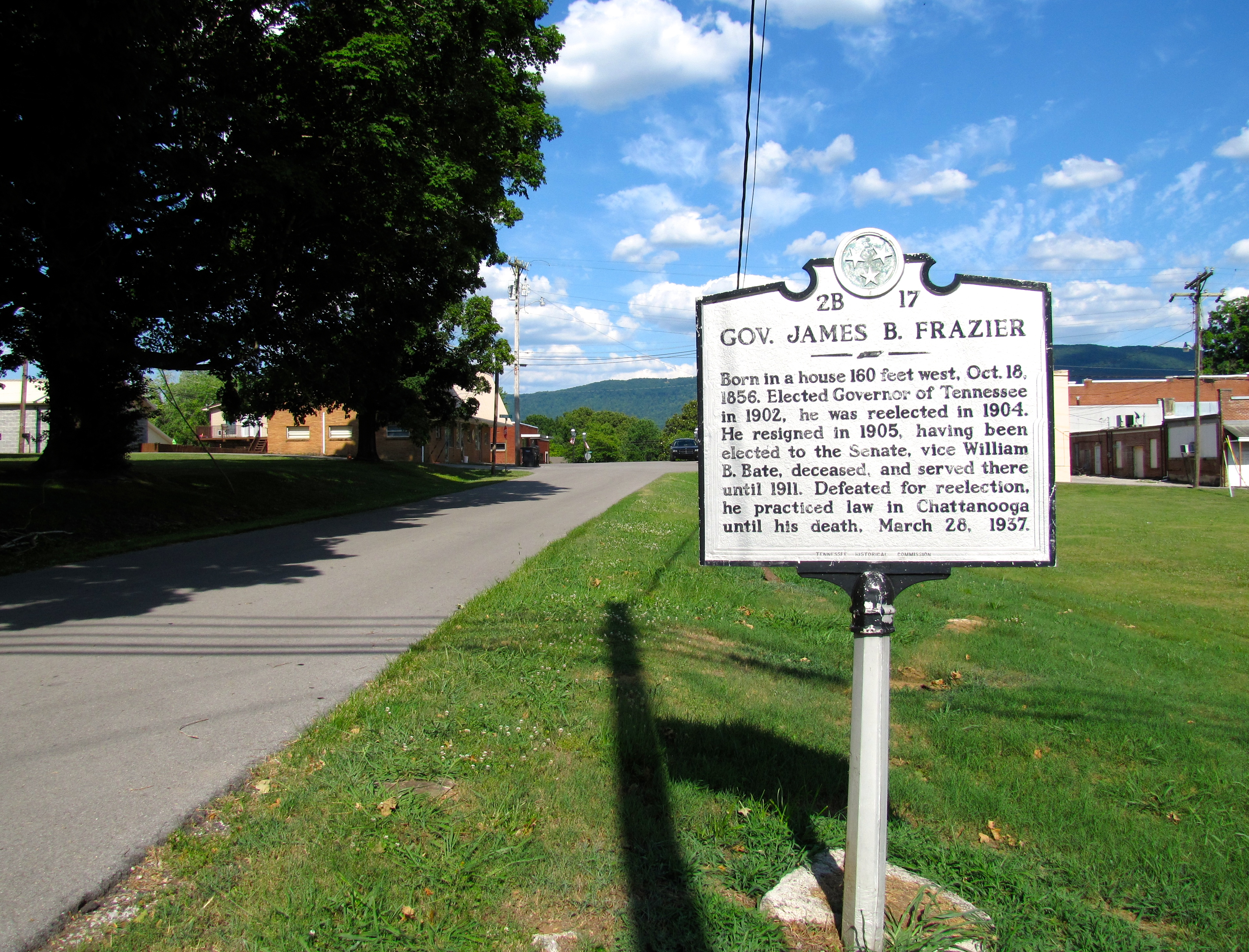
Tennessee Historical Commission marker in Frazier's hometown of Pikeville

On March 9, 1905, less than a week after the beginning of Frazier's second term, Senator William B. Bate died, prompting a scramble to fill his vacant seat. Former Governor Robert Love Taylor had for years campaigned unsuccessfully for a Senate seat, and believed he should be next in line. Frazier, however, also wanted the Senate seat, and while Taylor was still out of state on a speaking tour, Frazier quickly convened the General Assembly and had himself elected, then resigned the governorship. The Speaker of the Tennessee Senate, John I. Cox (who had helped engineer Frazier's election), succeeded him as governor.

Taylor was outraged by Frazier's actions, and suggested that Frazier, Cox, and U.S. Senator Edward W. Carmack were conspiring to control the state Democratic Party. To appease Taylor's supporters, the party allowed Taylor to face Carmack in a primary in 1906 (the first Senate primary in state history), which Taylor won. That same year, the Democratic Party refused to nominate Cox for reelection as governor.

As a senator, Frazier championed states' rights, and opposed most protective tariffs. He supported a federal income tax amendment and funding for highway construction. He campaigned for a second term in 1911, but state Democrats, irritated by the intra-party divisions created by his first election, refused to nominate him.

After leaving the Senate, Frazier returned to Chattanooga, where he practiced law with his son, James B. Frazier Jr. (1890–1978), in the firm, Frazier and Frazier. He died on March 28, 1937, and is buried in the city's Forest Hills Cemetery.

== Family ==
Frazier's great-grandfather, Samuel Frazier, and grandfather, Abner Frazier, both fought at the Battle of Kings Mountain in 1780. Samuel Frazier was of Scottish descent, while his wife, Rebecca Julian, was of French Huguenot descent. An uncle of James B. Frazier, Dr. Beriah Frazier (1812–1886), served as Mayor of Chattanooga in 1841, and represented Knox County at the East Tennessee Convention of 1861.

Frazier married Louise Douglas Keith in 1883. They had four children: Anne, James Jr., Thomas, and Louise. James B. Frazier Jr. represented Tennessee's 3rd congressional district in the U.S. House of Representatives from 1949 to 1963.

== See also ==
- List of governors of Tennessee

== Notes ==
Party political offices
| Preceded by Benton McMillin | Democratic nominee for Governor of Tennessee; 1902, 1904 | Succeeded by Malcolm R. Patterson |
Political offices
| Preceded by Benton McMillin | Governor of Tennessee; 1903–1905 | Succeeded by John I. Cox |
U.S. Senate
| Preceded by William B. Bate | U.S. senator (Class 1) from Tennessee; 1905–1911; Served alongside: Edward W. Carmack, Robert L. Taylor | Succeeded by Luke Lea |
