= 1904 Tennessee gubernatorial election =

- November 8, 1904
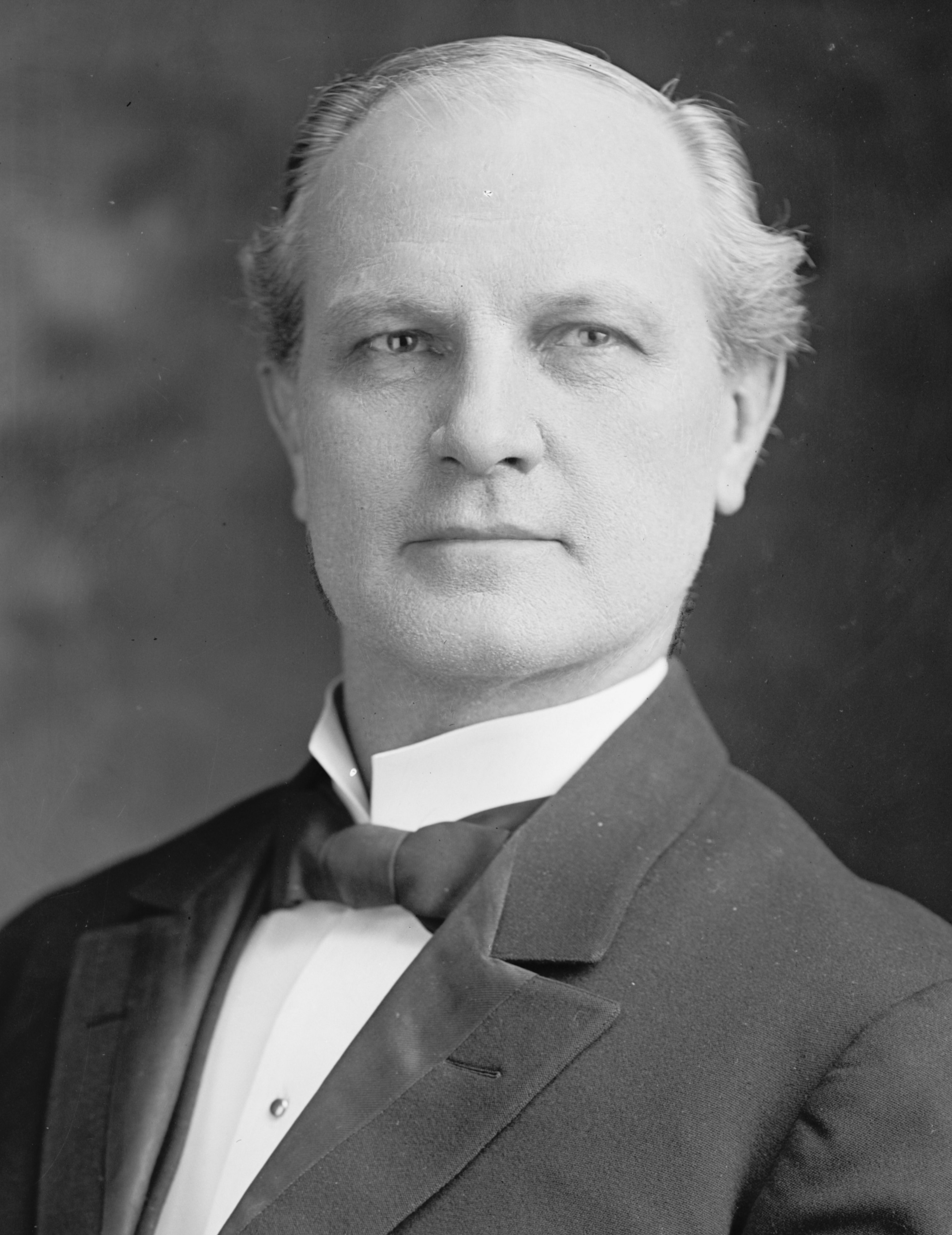

Nominee	James B. Frazier	Jessie M. Littleton
Party	Democratic	Republican
Popular vote	131,503	103,409
Percentage	55.72%	43.81%
- County results Frazier: 50–60% 60–70% 70–80% 80–90% >90% Littleton: 50–60% 60–70% 70–80% 80–90% >90%
Governor before election
James B. Frazier
Democratic
Elected Governor
James B. Frazier
Democratic

The 1904 Tennessee gubernatorial election was held on November 8, 1904. Incumbent Democratic governor James B. Frazier defeated Republican Winchester mayor Jessie M. Littleton with 55.72% of the vote.

== Background ==
Republicans nominated Winchester mayor Jesse Littleton to challenge Frazier. In September, governor Frazier and Littleton engaged in a series of fierce debates, primarily over the Four Mile Law, which Littleton argued should extend to the entire state, while Frazier, not wanting to further agitate liquor interests, argued that larger cities should remain exempt. On election day, Frazier won easily, capturing 131,503 votes to 103,409 for Littleton.

== General election ==
=== Candidates ===
Major party candidates

- James B. Frazier, Democratic
- Jessie M. Littleton, Republican

Other candidates

- John M. Ray, Socialist

=== Results ===
1904 Tennessee gubernatorial election
Party	Candidate	Votes	%	±%
Democratic	James B. Frazier (incumbent)	131,503	55.72%	
Republican	Jessie M. Littleton	103,409	43.81%	
Socialist	John M. Ray	1,109	0.47%	
Majority		28,094		
Turnout				
Democratic hold		Swing		

== See also ==
- 1904 United States presidential election in Tennessee
