= Bishop (surname) =

Bishop is a surname. Notable people with the surname include:

== A–G ==
- A. C. Bishop (fl. late 19th century), American politician
- Abby Bishop (born 1988), Australian professional basketball player
- Adam Bishop (born 1989), British strongman
- Adelaide Bishop (1928–2008), American operatic soprano, musical theatre actress, opera and stage director, and voice teacher
- Albert Webb Bishop (1832–1901), American lawyer, public official, and college president
- Alec Bishop (1897–1984), British Army officer and administrator
- Alfred Bishop (disambiguation), multiple people
- Alimenta Bishop (1914–2013), Grenadian activist and stateswoman
- Alison Bishop (disambiguation), multiple people
- Amanda Bishop, Australian actress
- Amasa Stone Bishop (1921–1997), American nuclear physicist
- Andrew Bishop (rugby union) (born 1985), Welsh international rugby union player
- Andy Bishop (born 1982), English footballer
- Angela Bishop (born 1967), Australian reporter and television presenter
- Ann Bishop (disambiguation), multiple people
- Arthur Bishop (disambiguation), multiple people
- Barbara Bishop (born 1956), Barbadian sprinter
- Barry Bishop (disambiguation), multiple people
- Beanie Bishop (born 1999), American football player
- Ben Bishop (born 1986), American professional ice hockey goaltender
- Bernardine Bishop (1939–2013), English novelist, teacher and psychotherapist
- Bernice Pauahi Bishop (1831–1884), Princess of the Kamehameha dynasty
- Billy Bishop (1894–1956), Canadian First World War flying ace
- Bob Bishop (scout), Northern Irish football scout for Manchester United
- Braden Bishop (born 1993), American baseball player
- William Bradford Bishop (born 1936), American former U.S. Foreign Service officer accused of killing his family; better known as Bradford Bishop
- Bridget Bishop (c. 1632 – 1692), the first person executed for witchcraft during the Salem witchcraft trials of 1692
- Bronwyn Bishop (born 1942), Australian politician
- Carl Whiting Bishop (1881–1942), American archeologist
- Charles Reed Bishop (1822–1915), American businessman and philanthropist
- Chris Bishop (disambiguation), multiple people
- Cindy Bishop (born 1978), Thai actress, model, TV personality and entrepreneur
- Claire Huchet Bishop (1898–1993), Swiss-American children's writer
- Cole Bishop (born 2001), American football player
- D'Andre Bishop (born 2002), Antigua and Barbuda international footballer
- Dan Bishop (born 1964), member of the U.S. House of Representatives from North Carolina
- David Bishop (runner) (born 1987), British middle-distance athlete
- David Bishop (writer) or D. V. Bishop, (born 1966), New Zealand, screenwriter, author and comics editor
- DeSean Bishop (born 2004), American football player
- Dickinson Bishop (1887–1961), American businessman, World War I veteran and Titanic survivor
- Dorothy Bishop (early 21st c.), American entertainer
- Dorothy V. M. Bishop (born 1952), British psychologist
- Duffy Bishop, American blues singer and songwriter
- Edward Bishop (disambiguation), multiple people
- Elizabeth Bishop (1911–1979), American poet and writer
- Elvin Bishop (born 1942), American blues and rock 'n roll musician
- Jamie Foxx (birth name Eric Marlon Bishop, born 1967), American actor, singer and comedian
- Errett Bishop (1926–1983), American mathematician
- Franklin Bishop (1932–2016), American politician

== H–M ==
- Haley Bishop, UK-based American actress
- Harold Bishop (American football) (born 1970), American football player
- Harold Bishop (engineer) (1900–1983), British broadcasting engineer
- Harriet Bishop (1817–1883), American educator, writer, suffragist and temperance activist
- Harry Bishop (politician) (1865–1920), Mayor of Juneau, Alaska
- Harry Gore Bishop (1874–1934), United States Army general
- Hazel Bishop (1906–1998), American chemist and founder of a cosmetics company
- Heather Bishop (born 1949), Canadian folk singer-songwriter
- Heber R. Bishop (1840–1902), American businessman and art collector
- Henry Alfred Bishop (1860–1934), American politician
- Henry Bishop (composer) (1787–1856), English composer
- Henry Bishop (postmaster general) (1605–1691), British postmaster general
- Henry Bishop (cricketer) (1849–1891), English-born Australian cricketer
- Henry Bishop (bird man and goldfish king) (1838–1907), American aquarist and aviculturist
- Henry W. Bishop (1829–1913), American community leader
- Howard Bishop, American actor
- Humphrey Bishop (1612–1675), English politician
- Hunter Bishop (born 1998), American baseball player
- Hutchens Chew Bishop (1859–1937), American priest
- Ian Bishop (disambiguation), multiple people, several people
- Isaac W. Bishop, 19th-century New York politician
- Jacqueline Bishop, Jamaican writer, visual artist and photographer
- James Bishop (disambiguation), multiple people, several people
- Jermaine Bishop (born 1997), American basketball player
- Jermaine Bishop Jr. (born 2008), American football player
- Jerry G. Bishop (1936–2013), American radio and television personality
- Jesse Bishop (1933–1979), American convicted murderer
- Joey Bishop (1918–2007), American entertainer
- John Bishop (disambiguation), multiple people, several people
- Joyce Bishop (1896–1993), English educator
- Julie Bishop (born 1956), Australian politician
- Julie Bishop (actress) (1914–2001), Hollywood leading lady of the 1930s and 40s
- K. J. Bishop, Australian writer and artist
- Katharine Bishop (1889–1976), co-discoverer of Vitamin E
- Kelly Bishop (born 1944), American actress
- Kevin Bishop (born 1980), English actor and comedian
- Kirsten Bishop (1963–2014), voice actress
- Lloyd Bishop (1890–1968), American baseball player
- Malcolm Bishop (born 1944), Welsh lawyer and QC
- Mark Bishop (born 1954), Australian Labor Party member
- Mary Agnes Dalrymple Bishop (1857–1934), American journalist, newspaper editor
- Maurice Bishop (1944–1983), Grenadian revolutionary and politician
- Max Bishop (1889–1962), American baseball player
- Meredith Bishop (born 1976), American actress
- Mervyn Bishop (born 1945), Australian photographer
- Michael Bishop (disambiguation), multiple people, several people
- J. Michael Bishop (1936–2026), American immunologist and microbiologist
- Morris Bishop (1893–1973), American scholar, historian, biographer, author, and humorist

== N–Z ==
- Neal Bishop (born 1981), English footballer
- Nic Bishop (born 1973), Australian actor
- Nicholas Bishop (actor, born 1985), British actor
- Raymond J. Bishop (1906–1978), Catholic priest and exorcist
- Richard M. Bishop (1812–1893), American politician from Ohio
- Rob Bishop (born 1951), Republican member of the U.S. House of Representatives
- Robert Bishop (artist), bondage artist, also known by the pseudonym "Bishop"
- Robert Hamilton Bishop (1777–1855), first president of Miami University
- Roswell P. Bishop (1843–1920), American politician from Michigan
- Rudine Sims Bishop (born 1937), US-American professor of literature
- Russell Bishop (disambiguation), multiple people
- Ruth Bishop (1933–2022), Australian virologist
- Sarah Bishop, British journalist
- Seth Scott Bishop (1852–1923), American laryngologist
- Sherman C. Bishop (1887–1951), American herpetologist and arachnologist
- Sid Bishop (footballer, born 1900), died 1949, English international footballer with West Ham United, Leicester City and Chelsea
- Sid Bishop (footballer, born 1934) died 2020, English footballer with Leyton Orient
- Stephen Bishop (disambiguation), multiple people, several people
- Stuart Bishop (born c. 1975), member of the Louisiana House of Representatives
- Tim Bishop (born 1950), American politician from New York
- Tony Bishop (born 1989), Panamanian basketball player
- Vaughn Bishop, Former American intelligence officer and deputy director of the Central Intelligence Agency (CIA)
- Vivien Bishop (born 1945), New Zealand painter
- Walter Bishop (disambiguation), multiple people
- Wesley T. Bishop (born 1967), American academic, lawyer, and politician

== Fictional characters ==
- Elle Bishop on the American TV series Heroes
- Ellie Bishop on NCIS
- Emily Bishop and Ernest Bishop on Coronation Street
- Harold Bishop on Neighbours
- Helen Bishop on Mad Men
- Peter Bishop and Dr. Walter Bishop on Fringe
- Winston Bishop on New Girl

== See also ==
- Bishop (disambiguation), multiple people
- Bishop Bishop (disambiguation), multiple people
- Bishopp
- Bischof
- Bischoff
- The Bishops, respectively Michael and Peter Bishop
