= John Bischoff =

John Bischoff may refer to:

- John W. Bischoff (1850–1909), blind American musician
- John Bischoff (baseball) (1894–1981), American baseball player
- John Bischoff (musician) (born 1949), American musician, pioneer in live computer music

== See also ==
- Bischoff
