= Tom Bishop =

Tom Bishop may refer to:

- Tommy Bishop (born 1940), English rugby league player
- Tom Bishop (bowls) (born 1991), English lawn bowler
- Tom Bishop (triathlete) (born 1991), British triathlete
- Tom Bishop (basketball), Canadian basketball player in the 1970s

== See also ==
- Thomas Bishop (disambiguation)
