= Bischoff =

- Pronunciation: /ˈbɪʃɒf/ BISH-off

Origin
- Region of origin: German

Bischoff is a German surname. Notable people with the surname include:

- Amaury Bischoff (born 1987), Portuguese-born French footballer
- Anna Catharina Bischoff (1719–1787), wife of pastor Lucas Gernler, known for her well-conserved mummy
- Bernard J. Bischoff (1931–1980), American politician and judge
- Bernhard Bischoff (1906–1991), German historian and paleographer
- Bob Bischoff (born 1941), American politician
- David Bischoff (1951–2018), American science fiction and television writer
- Eduard Hagenbach-Bischoff (1833–1910), Swiss physicist and electoral reformer
- Elmer Bischoff (1916–1991), American artist
- Eric Bischoff, (born 1955), American wrestling announcer, producer and performer
- Franz Bischoff (1864–1929), American artist
- Garett Bischoff (born 1984), American wrestler
- Hans Bischoff (1889–1960), German entomologist
- Hermann Bischoff (1868–1936), German composer
- John Bischoff (1894–1981), American baseball player
- John Bischoff, (born 1949), American composer
- John W. Bischoff (1850–1909), American blind musician and composer
- Karl Bischoff (1897–1950), German architect, engineer and Nazi functionary, chief of construction of Auschwitz II-Birkenau camp
- Klaus Bischoff (born 1960), German chess player
- Klaus Zyciora (born Klaus Bischoff; 1961), German automotive designer
- Manfred Bischoff (born 1942), German businessman
- Mikkel Bischoff (born 1982), Danish football pundit and former player
- Sabine Bischoff (1958–2013), German fencer
- Samuel Bischoff (1890–1975), American film producer
- Suzanne Bischoff van Heemskerck (born 1950), Dutch politician
- Theodor Ludwig Wilhelm von Bischoff (1807–1882), German biologist
- Winfried Bischoff, (1941–2023), Anglo-German banker, financier, chairman of Citigroup

== See also ==
- Mount Bischoff, Tasmania, Australia
- Hagenbach-Bischoff system and Hagenbach-Bischoff quota, terms describing a form of allocating seats in proportional representation, named after Eduard Hagenbach-Bischoff
- Bischof (German: bishop)
- Bishoff
- Bishop (surname)
