= Henry Bishop =

Henry Bishop may refer to:

- Henry (bishop of Finland) (died 1156), English clergyman
- Henry Bishop (bird man and goldfish king) (1837–1907), American pet bird and fish dealer
- Henry Bishop (composer) (1786–1855), English composer
- Henry Bishop (cricketer) (1849–1891), Australian cricketer
- Henry Bishop (postmaster general) (1605–1691/2), Postmaster General of England
- Henry Bishop (priest) (c. 1800–1857), English priest and academic
- Henry Alfred Bishop (1860–1934), superintendent and vice-president of several Eastern railroads
- Henry W. Bishop (1829–1913), Massachusetts-born citizen of Chicago, Illinois

== See also ==
- Harry Bishop (disambiguation)
