= List of baseball players who underwent Tommy John surgery =

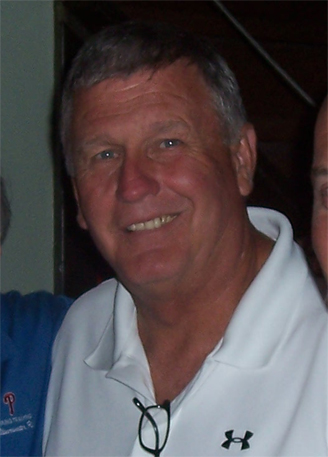
Tommy John was the first baseball player to undergo the surgery.

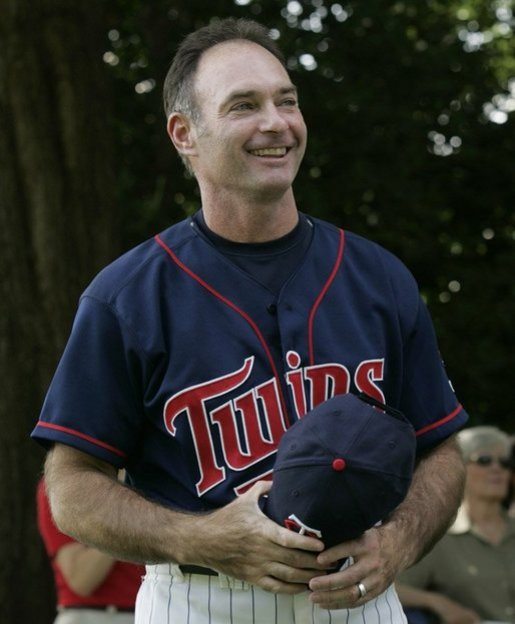
Paul Molitor was the first player who underwent the surgery to be elected to the Hall of Fame.

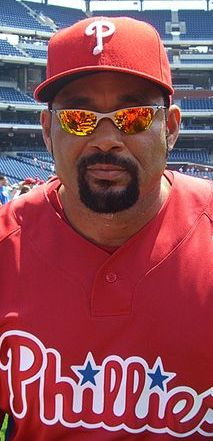
José Mesa was one of the first players born outside the United States to undergo the surgery.

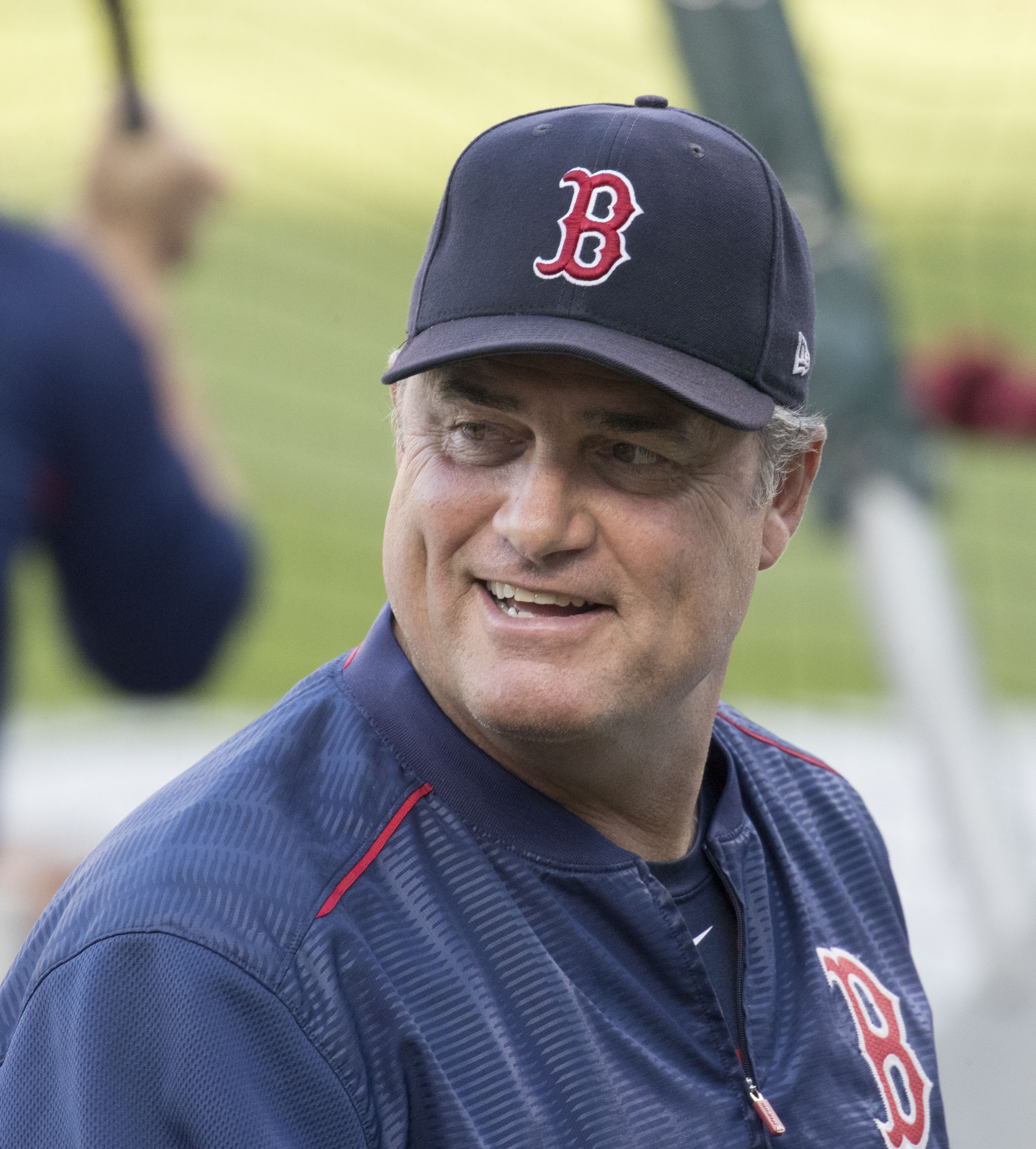
John Farrell was perhaps the first player to undergo the surgery twice.

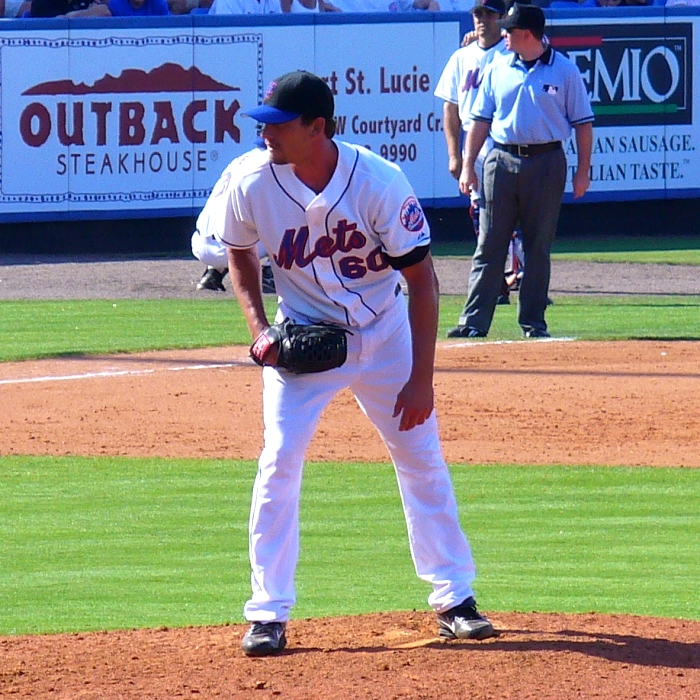
Scott Schoeneweis was one of the first players to undergo the surgery while in college.

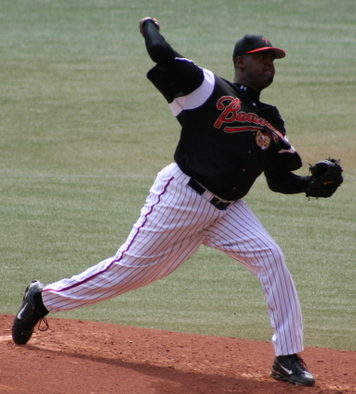
Dewon Brazelton was one of the first players to undergo the surgery while in high school.

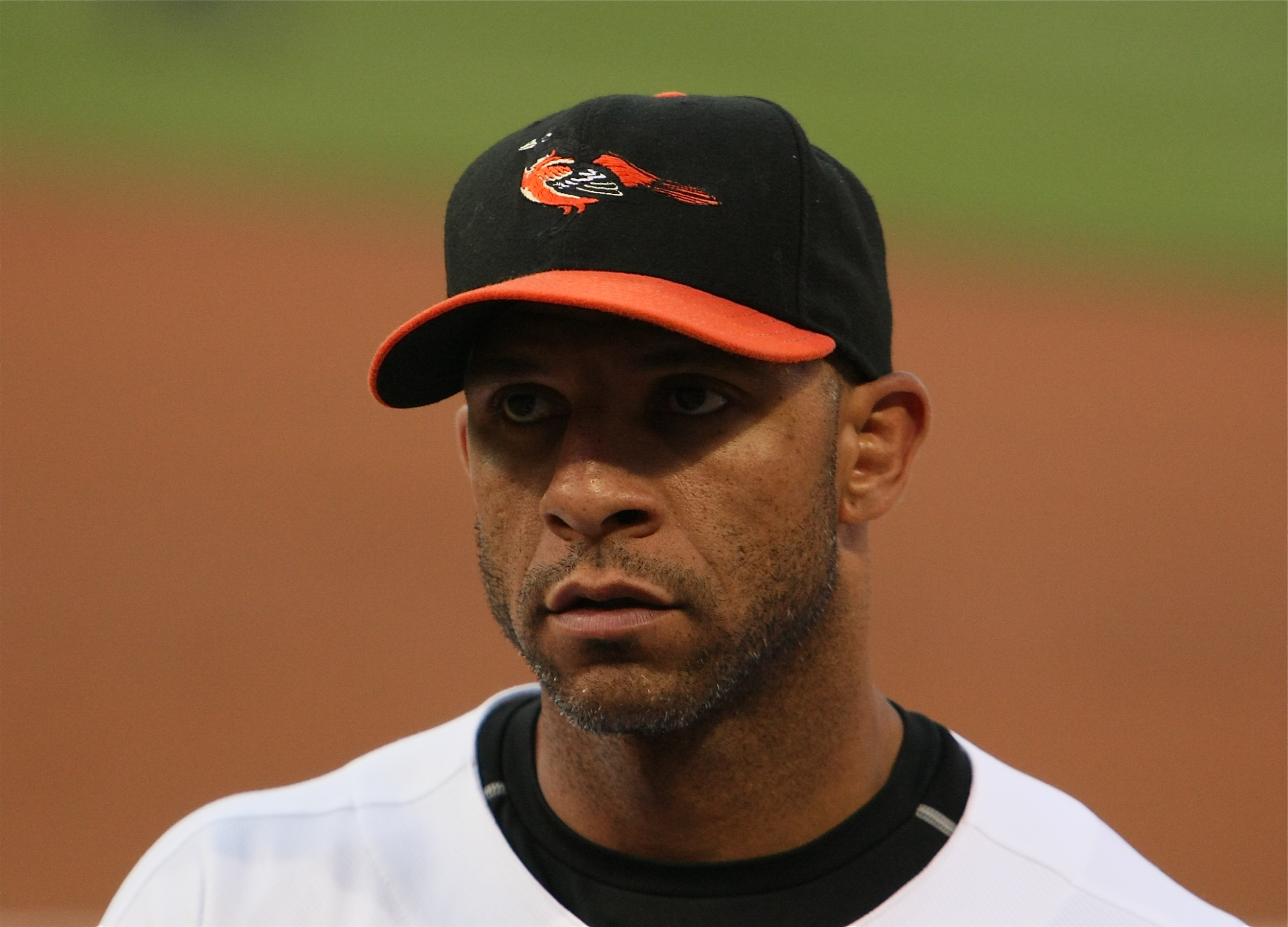
Jay Payton was one of the first position players to undergo the surgery twice.

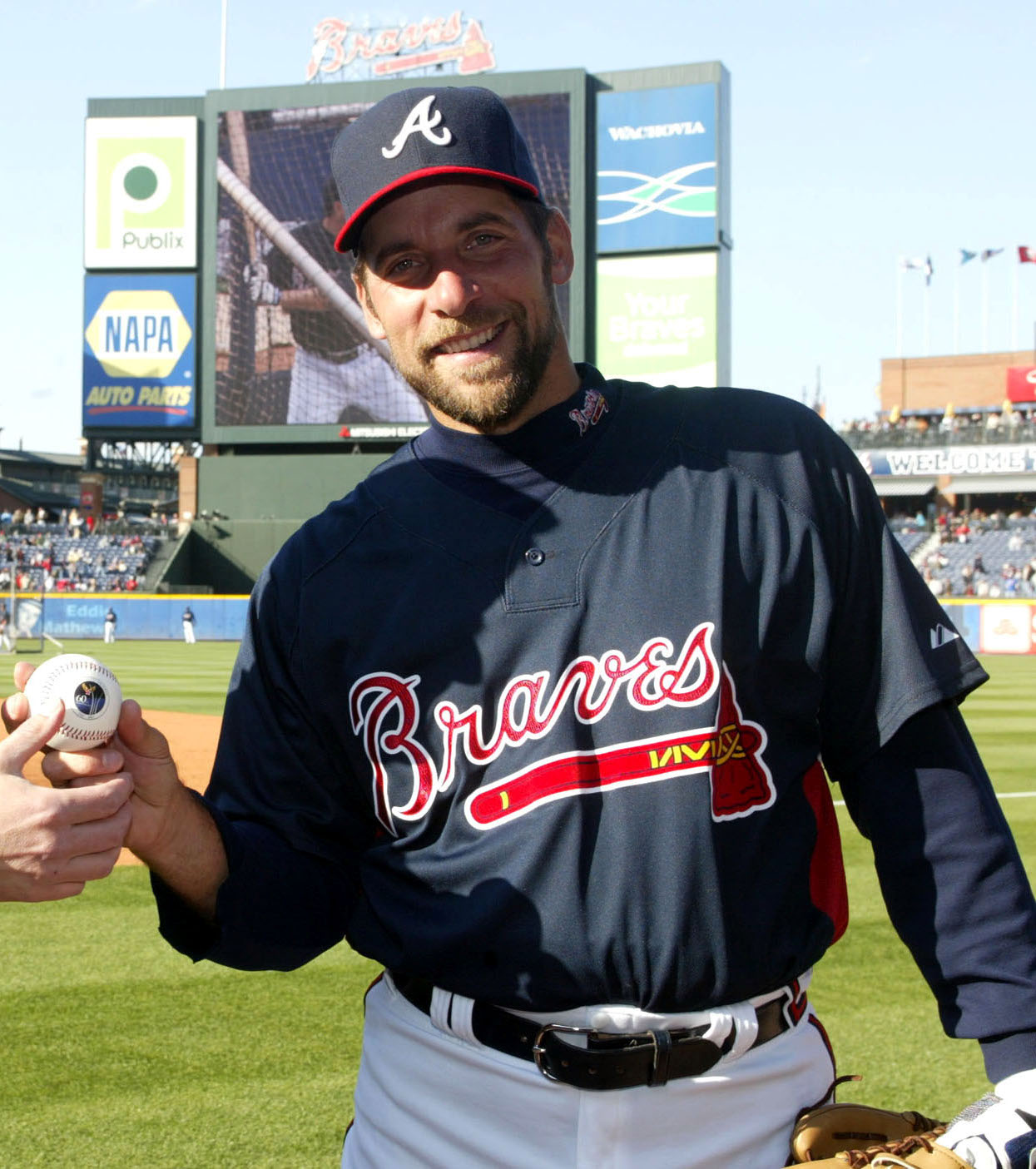
John Smoltz was the first pitcher who underwent the surgery to be elected to the Hall of Fame.

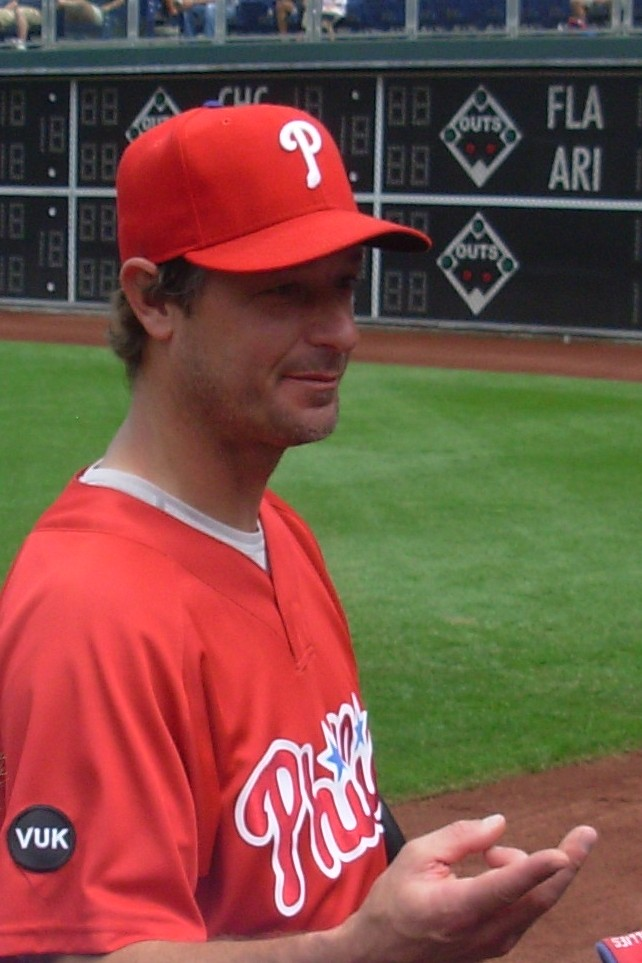
Jamie Moyer is the oldest player to undergo the surgery.

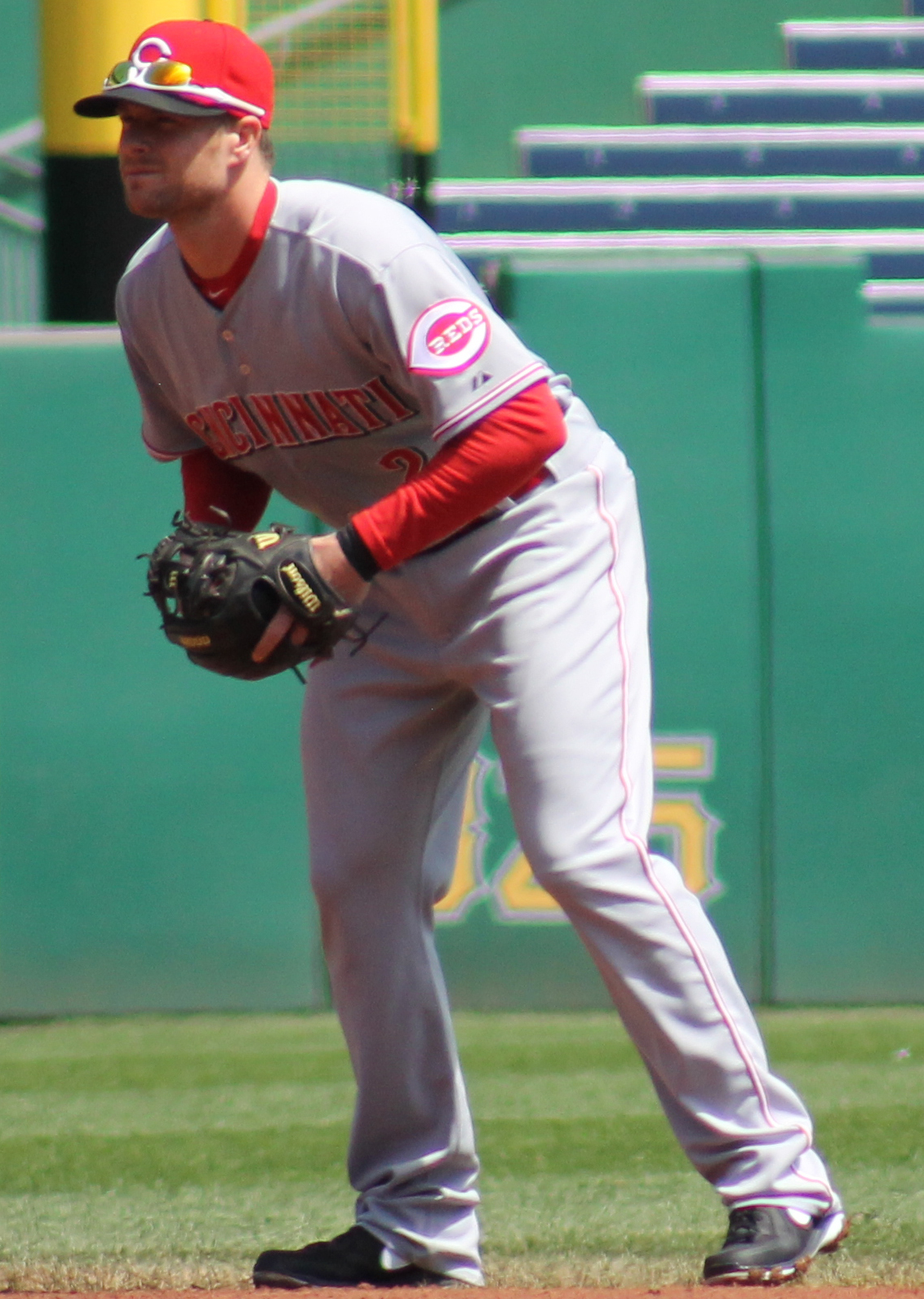
Zack Cozart was the first player to undergo the surgery on his non-throwing arm.

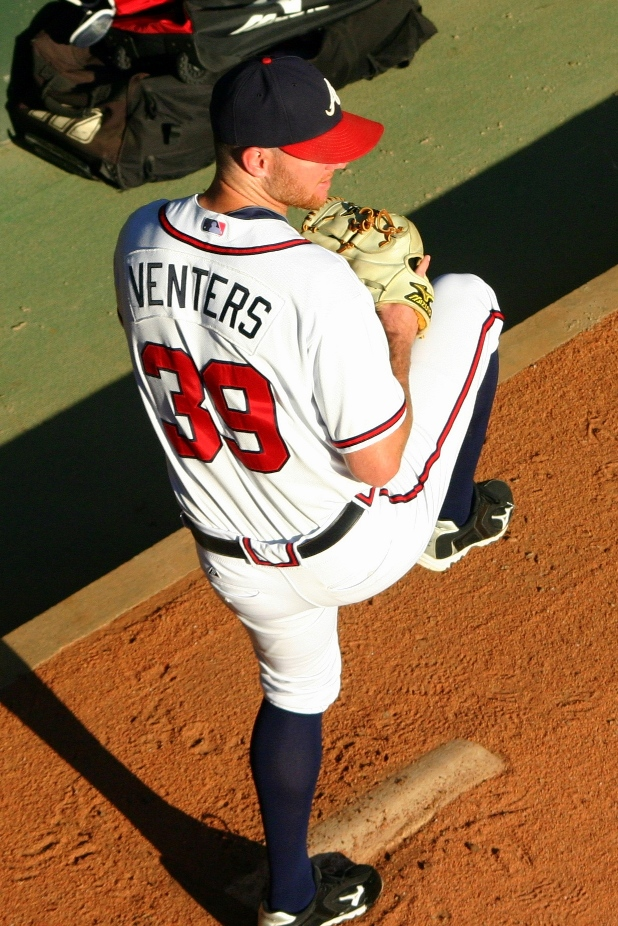
Jonny Venters is one of the only players to undergo the surgery more than two times.

Tommy John surgery (TJS), known in medical practice as ulnar collateral ligament (UCL) reconstruction, is a surgical graft procedure in which the ulnar collateral ligament in the medial elbow is replaced with either a tendon from elsewhere from the patient's own body, or the use of a tendon from the donated tissue from a cadaver. The procedure is common among collegiate and professional athletes in several sports, most notably baseball.

The procedure was first performed in 1974 by orthopedic surgeon Dr. Frank Jobe, then a Los Angeles Dodgers team physician. The surgery is named after Tommy John, the first recipient of the surgery. John won 288 games in his career – 124 before the surgery and 164 after. Many players have subsequently undergone the surgery, some more than once. Three players (Paul Molitor, John Smoltz, and Billy Wagner) have undergone the surgery and been inducted into the National Baseball Hall of Fame. Pitcher Hong-Chih Kuo underwent the surgery a record four times before making a return to the MLB with the Los Angeles Dodgers, while Tejay Antone had three successive surgeries before making his way back to professional baseball.

== List ==
† Denotes a player that underwent the surgery on his non-throwing arm.

Player	Position	Throws	Date of surgery	Ref
David Aardsma	Pitcher	Right	July 22, 2011	
Don Aase	Pitcher	Right	October 18, 1982	
Nate Adcock	Pitcher	Right	August 2015	
Nick Adenhart	Pitcher	Right	June 2004	
Brady Aiken	Pitcher	Left	March 2015	
Sandy Alcántara	Pitcher	Right	October 6, 2023	
Dan Altavilla	Pitcher	Right	June 9, 2021	
Brett Anderson	Pitcher	Left	July 15, 2011	
Brian Anderson	Pitcher	Left	June 2005; 2006	
Cody Anderson	Pitcher	Right	March 2017	
Ian Anderson	Pitcher	Right	April 13, 2023	
Justin Anderson	Pitcher	Right	July 2020	
Rick Ankiel	Pitcher / Outfielder	Left	July 2003	
Brad Arnsberg	Pitcher	Right	1988	
José Arredondo	Pitcher	Right	February 2010	
Bronson Arroyo	Pitcher	Right	July 15, 2014	
Andy Ashby	Pitcher	Right	2003	
Mike Avilés	Infielder	Right	2009	
Danys Báez	Pitcher	Right	October 26, 2007	
Homer Bailey	Pitcher	Right	May 8, 2015	
John Baker	Catcher	Right	2010	
Scott Baker	Pitcher	Right	April 17, 2012	
Rocco Baldelli	Outfielder	Right	June 2005	
Anthony Banda	Pitcher	Left	June 2018	
Franklin Barreto	Infielder	Right	May 2021	
Aaron Barrett	Pitcher	Right	September 3, 2015	
Chris Bassitt	Pitcher	Right	May 5, 2016	
Brandon Beachy	Pitcher	Right	June 21, 2012; March 21, 2014	
Rod Beck	Pitcher	Right	October 2001	
Érik Bédard	Pitcher	Left	September 10, 2002	
Matt Beech	Pitcher	Left	1998; 1999	
Tyler Beede	Pitcher	Right	March 20, 2020	
Jalen Beeks	Pitcher	Left	September 2, 2020	
Joe Beimel	Pitcher	Left	May 1, 2012	
Kris Benson	Pitcher	Right	May 22, 2001	
Adam Bernero	Pitcher	Right	2007	
José Berríos	Pitcher	Right	May 20, 2026	
Prelander Berroa	Pitcher	Right	March 2025	
Joe Biagini	Pitcher	Right	2010	
Jesse Biddle	Pitcher	Left	October 14, 2015	
Hunter Bishop	Outfielder	Right	April 2023	
Kyle Blanks	Infielder / Outfielder	Right	May 1, 2012	
Ricky Bones	Pitcher	Right	May 2003	
Pedro Borbón Jr.	Pitcher	Left	August 30, 1996	
Dewon Brazelton	Pitcher	Right	1996	
Bill Bray	Pitcher	Left	May 2009	
John Brebbia	Pitcher	Right	June 2020	
Zack Britton	Pitcher	Left	September 9, 2021	
Doug Brocail	Pitcher	Right	2001; 2002	
Kris Bubic	Pitcher	Left	April 21, 2023	
Luke Keaschall	Outfielder	Right	August 10, 2024	
JT Brubaker	Pitcher	Right	April 2023	
Walker Buehler	Pitcher	Right	August 5, 2015; August 23, 2022	
Ambiorix Burgos	Pitcher	Right	August 28, 2007	
A. J. Burnett	Pitcher	Right	April 2003	
Sean Burnett	Pitcher	Left	June 6, 2014	
Corbin Burnes	Pitcher	Right	June 2025	
Paul Byrd	Pitcher	Right	July 1, 2003	
Tom Candiotti	Pitcher	Right	October 1981	
Jose Canseco	Outfielder	Right	July 9, 1993	
Carter Capps	Pitcher	Right	March 8, 2016	
Chris Capuano	Pitcher	Left	May 2002; May 2008	
Juan Carela	Pitcher	Right	March 2025	
Sam Carlson	Pitcher	Right	July 2, 2018	
Chris Carpenter	Pitcher	Right	July 2007	
Carlos Carrasco	Pitcher	Right	September 14, 2011	
Curt Casali	Catcher	Right	2009	
Kervin Castro	Catcher	Right	2017	
Joba Chamberlain	Pitcher	Right	June 16, 2011	
Bruce Chen	Pitcher	Left	2007	
Wei-Yin Chen	Pitcher	Left	2006	
Yonny Chirinos	Pitcher	Right	August 25, 2020	
Shin-Soo Choo	Outfielder	Left	September 2007	
Steve Christmas	Catcher	Right	1986	
Mike Clevinger	Pitcher	Right	November 17, 2020	
Alex Cobb	Pitcher	Right	May 14, 2015	
Todd Coffey	Pitcher	Right	August 1999; July 2012	
Phil Coke	Pitcher	Left	August 2018	
Greg Colbrunn	Infielder	Right	1991; August 10, 1993	
Gerrit Cole	Pitcher	Right	March 11, 2025	
Tim Collins	Pitcher	Left	March 2015; March 2016	
Patrick Corbin	Pitcher	Left	March 25, 2014	
Rheal Cormier	Pitcher	Left	1997	
Manny Corpas	Pitcher	Right	2010	
Chris Coste	Catcher	Right	2010	
Jharel Cotton	Pitcher	Right	March 21, 2018	
Neal Cotts	Pitcher	Left	July 2009	
Zack Cozart	Shortstop	Right†	August 2011	
Carl Crawford	Outfielder	Left	August 23, 2012	
Garrett Crochet	Pitcher	Left	April 2, 2022	
Johnny Cueto	Pitcher	Right	August 2, 2018	
Brandon Cumpton	Pitcher	Right	March 10, 2015	
John Curtiss	Pitcher	Right	August 2012; September 7, 2021	
Travis d'Arnaud	Catcher	Right	April 17, 2018	
Yu Darvish	Pitcher	Right	March 17, 2015	
Ben Davis	Catcher	Right	2005	
Grant Dayton	Pitcher	Left	August 29, 2017	
Jorge de la Rosa	Pitcher	Left	2011	
Rubby De La Rosa	Pitcher	Right	2011; August 2, 2017	
José De León	Pitcher	Right	March 13, 2018	
Jacob deGrom	Pitcher	Right	October 10, 2010; June 12, 2023	
Manny Delcarmen	Pitcher	Right	May 2, 2003	
Ryan Dempster	Pitcher	Right	August 4, 2003	
Chris Devenski	Pitcher	Right	June 5, 2021	
Joey Devine	Pitcher	Right	2009; 2012	
Alex Dickerson	Outfielder	Left	March 2018	
Octavio Dotel	Pitcher	Right	June 6, 2005	
Félix Doubront	Pitcher	Left	April 12, 2016	
Hunter Dobbins	Pitcher	Right	September 2, 2026	
Darren Dreifort	Pitcher	Right	March 14, 1995; July 9, 2001	
Danny Duffy	Pitcher	Left	June 13, 2012	
Zach Duke	Pitcher	Left	October 14, 2016	
Erubiel Durazo	Designated hitter	Left	2005	
Adam Eaton	Pitcher	Right	2001	
Josh Edgin	Pitcher	Left	March 2015	
Cal Eldred	Pitcher	Right	June 23, 1995	
Nathan Eovaldi	Pitcher	Right	May 2007; August 19, 2016	
Scott Erickson	Pitcher	Right	August 2000	
Robbie Erlin	Pitcher	Left	May 2016	
Pete Fairbanks	Pitcher	Right	2011; 2017	
John Farrell	Pitcher	Right	October 1990; September 1991	
Erick Fedde	Pitcher	Right	June 3, 2015	
Scott Feldman	Pitcher	Right	2003	
Neftalí Feliz	Pitcher	Right	August 1, 2012	
Caleb Ferguson	Pitcher	Left	2014; September 23, 2020	
José Fernández	Pitcher	Right	May 16, 2014	
Matt Festa	Pitcher	Right	March 2020	
Gavin Floyd	Pitcher	Right	May 2013	
John Foster	Pitcher	Left	June 6, 2006	
Chad Fox	Pitcher	Right	July 1996; July 27, 1997	
John Franco	Pitcher	Left	May 15, 2002	
Jason Frasor	Pitcher	Right	1999; 2001	
Max Fried	Pitcher	Left	August 20, 2014	
Kyuji Fujikawa	Pitcher	Right	June 2013	
Rafael Furcal	Shortstop	Right	March 7, 2013	
Michael Fulmer	Pitcher	Right	March 27, 2019	
Éric Gagné	Pitcher	Right	1997; June 2005	
Jaime García	Pitcher	Left	2008	
Luis García	Pitcher	Right	May 19, 2023	
Yimi García	Pitcher	Right	October 25, 2016	
Domingo Germán	Pitcher	Right	March 31, 2015	
Dan Giese	Pitcher	Right	2009	
Ken Giles	Pitcher	Right	September 30, 2020	
Tyler Glasnow	Pitcher	Right	August 4, 2021	
Chi Chi Gonzalez	Pitcher	Right	July 2017	
Geremi González	Pitcher	Right	August 21, 1998	
Mike Gonzalez	Pitcher	Left	May 31, 2007	
Tom Gordon	Pitcher	Right	December 13, 1999	
Daniel Gossett	Pitcher	Right	August 1, 2018	
Jim Gott	Pitcher	Right	April 1989	
Chad Green	Pitcher	Right	June 1, 2022	
Hunter Greene	Pitcher	Right	April 2019	
Didi Gregorius	Shortstop	Right	October 17, 2018	
A. J. Griffin	Pitcher	Right	April 30, 2014	
Jason Grilli	Pitcher	Right	2002	
Jay Groome	Pitcher	Left	May 2018	
Jandel Gustave	Pitcher	Right	June 21, 2017	
Darryl Hamilton	Outfielder	Right	June 22, 1994	
Mike Hampton	Pitcher	Left	September 25, 2005	
Joel Hanrahan	Pitcher	Right	May 16, 2013; March 2015	
Bryce Harper	Right fielder / Designated hitter	Right	November 23, 2022	
Matt Harvey	Pitcher	Right	October 22, 2013	
Brad Hawpe	First baseman	Left	August 5, 2011	
Andrew Heaney	Pitcher	Left	July 2016	
Jeremy Hefner	Pitcher	Right	August 2013; 2014	
Ben Heller	Pitcher	Right	April 6, 2018	
Johnny Hellweg	Pitcher	Right	April 29, 2014	
Pat Hentgen	Pitcher	Right	August 2001	
Sam Hentges	Pitcher	Left	July 5, 2016	
Ty Hensley	Pitcher	Right	March 31, 2015	
David Hernandez	Pitcher	Right	March 24, 2014	
Joe Hesketh	Pitcher	Left	1981	
Aaron Hicks	Outfielder	Right	October 30, 2019	
Jordan Hicks	Pitcher	Right	June 26, 2019	
Kyle Higashioka	Catcher	Right	2013	
Jaden Hill	Pitcher	Right	April 2021	
Sterling Hitchcock	Pitcher	Left	June 6, 2000	
Jeff Hoffman	Pitcher	Right	2014	
Gunnar Hoglund	Pitcher	Right	May 15, 2021	
Greg Holland	Pitcher	Right	October 2, 2015	
Mario Hollands	Pitcher	Left	April 8, 2015	
Matt Holliday	Outfielder	Right	July 24, 2001	
Brent Honeywell	Pitcher	Right	February 27, 2018	
J. R. House	Catcher	Right	2002	
Daniel Hudson	Pitcher	Right	July 9, 2012; June 18, 2013	
Tim Hudson	Pitcher	Right	August 2, 2008	
Todd Hundley	Catcher	Right	1997	
Philip Humber	Pitcher	Right	2005	
Jason Isringhausen	Pitcher	Right	January 13, 1998; September 2008; June 16, 2009	
César Izturis	Shortstop	Right	September 17, 2005	
A. J. Jiménez	Catcher	Right	2012	
Tommy John	Pitcher	Left	September 25, 1974	
Josh Johnson	Pitcher	Right	August 3, 2007; April 24, 2014; September 2015	
Jahmai Jones	Infielder	Right	May 27, 2022	
Nate Jones	Pitcher	Right	July 11, 2017	
Tommy Kahnle	Pitcher	Right	August 4, 2020	
Steve Karsay	Pitcher	Right	1995	
Anthony Kay	Pitcher	Left	October 4, 2016	
Keone Kela	Pitcher	Right	May 19, 2021	
Casey Kelly	Pitcher	Right	April 2, 2013	
Don Kelly	Infielder / Outfielder	Right	July 14, 2015	
Steven Kent	Pitcher	Left	December 2, 2013	
Spencer Kieboom	Catcher	Right	2013	
Josh Kinney	Pitcher	Right	2007	
Andrew Kittredge	Pitcher	Right	June 22, 2022	
Andrew Knapp	Catcher	Right	2013	
Billy Koch	Pitcher	Right	1997	
Tyler Kolek	Pitcher	Right	April 7, 2016	
George Kontos	Pitcher	Right	July 7, 2009	
Michael Kopech	Pitcher	Right	September 18, 2018	
Jackson Kowar	Pitcher	Right	March 2024	
Max Kranick	Pitcher	Right	June 3, 2022	
Hong-Chih Kuo	Pitcher	Left	2000; 2003	
Chad Kuhl	Pitcher	Right	September 19, 2018	
John Lackey	Pitcher	Right	November 1, 2011	
John Lamb	Pitcher	Left	July 10, 2018	
Dinelson Lamet	Pitcher	Right	April 2018	
Max Lazar	Pitcher	Right	2021	
Jack Leathersich	Pitcher	Left	July 30, 2015	
Justin Lehr	Pitcher	Right	May 2010	
Colby Lewis	Pitcher	Right	September 27, 1996	
Jon Lieber	Pitcher	Right	August 7, 2002	
Kerry Ligtenberg	Pitcher	Right	April 1999	
Jacob Lindgren	Pitcher	Left	August 2016; March 27, 2018	
Francisco Liriano	Pitcher	Left	November 6, 2006	
Rodrigo López	Pitcher	Right	August 22, 2007	
Barret Loux	Pitcher	Right	2013	
Richard Lovelady	Pitcher	Left	September 2021	
Joey Lucchesi	Pitcher	Left	June 24, 2021	
Trey Lunsford	Catcher	Right	2006	
Lance Lynn	Pitcher	Right	November 10, 2015	
Ryan Madson	Pitcher	Right	March 2012	
Kenta Maeda	Pitcher	Right	September 1, 2021	
Matt Magill	Pitcher	Right	May 2015	
Matt Mantei	Pitcher	Right	June 19, 2001	
Joe Mantiply	Pitcher	Left	March 9, 2018	
Shaun Marcum	Pitcher	Right	September 30, 2008	
Corbin Martin	Pitcher	Right	July 3, 2019	
Jorge Mateo	Infielder	Right	August 28, 2024	
Daisuke Matsuzaka	Pitcher	Right	June 10, 2011	
Scott Mathieson	Pitcher	Right	September 2006	
Michael Matuella	Pitcher	Right	April 2015	
Steven Matz	Pitcher	Left	May 18, 2010	
Dustin May	Pitcher	Right	May 12, 2021	
Trevor May	Pitcher	Right	March 22, 2017	
Joe Mays	Pitcher	Right	2003	
Tim Mayza	Pitcher	Left	September 18, 2019	
Brandon McCarthy	Pitcher	Right	April 30, 2015	
Shane McClanahan	Pitcher	Left	2016; August 21, 2023	
Lance McCullers Jr.	Pitcher	Right	November 6, 2018	
Dustin McGowan	Pitcher	Right	May 13, 2004	
Andrew McKirahan	Pitcher	Left	2012; March 2016	
John Means	Pitcher	Left	April 27, 2022	
Kris Medlen	Pitcher	Right	August 2010; March 18, 2014	
Jenrry Mejía	Pitcher	Right	April 2011	
José Mesa	Pitcher	Right	June 1989	
Keynan Middleton	Pitcher	Right	May 22, 2018	
Shelby Miller	Pitcher	Right	May 10, 2017	
Eric Milton	Pitcher	Left	June 2007	
Casey Mize	Pitcher	Right	June 15, 2022	
Paul Molitor	Third baseman	Right	May 21, 1984	
Rafael Montero	Pitcher	Right	March 2018	
Jordan Montgomery	Pitcher	Left	June 7, 2018; April 2025	
Matt Moore	Pitcher	Left	April 22, 2014	
Orber Moreno	Pitcher	Right	June 2000	
Jim Morris	Pitcher	Left	January 1986	
Matt Morris	Pitcher	Right	April 1999	
Charlie Morton	Pitcher	Right	June 2012	
Jon Moscot	Pitcher	Right	July 2016	
Jamie Moyer	Pitcher	Left	December 1, 2010	
Andrés Muñoz	Pitcher	Right	March 2020	
Joe Musgrove	Pitcher	Right	November 2024	
Xavier Nady	Outfielder	Right	2001; 2009	
Joe Nathan	Pitcher	Right	March 2010; April 29, 2015	
Packy Naughton	Pitcher	Left	2013	
Denny Neagle	Pitcher	Left	2003	
Jimmy Nelson	Pitcher	Right	August 2021	
Iván Nova	Pitcher	Right	April 29, 2014	
Darien Núñez	Pitcher	Left	April 2022	
Ryan O'Rourke	Pitcher	Left	April 2017	
Shohei Ohtani	Pitcher / Designated hitter	Right	October 1, 2018	
Darren Oliver	Pitcher	Left	May 1991	
Steve Ontiveros	Pitcher	Right	1989; June 1996	
Roberto Osuna	Pitcher	Right	June 2013	
Connor Overton	Pitcher	Right	May 23, 2023	
Chris Paddack	Pitcher	Right	August 15, 2016	
Juan Padilla	Pitcher	Right	March 14, 2006	
Jarrod Parker	Pitcher	Right	October 28, 2009; March 24, 2014	
Bobby Parnell	Pitcher	Right	April 2014	
John Parrish	Pitcher	Left	July 15, 2005	
Carl Pavano	Pitcher	Right	June 5, 2007	
Jay Payton	Outfielder	Right	1995; March 1997	
James Paxton	Pitcher	Left	April 2021	
Mike Pelfrey	Pitcher	Right	April 2012	
Odalis Pérez	Pitcher	Left	August 5, 1999	
Salvador Pérez	Catcher	Right	March 6, 2019	
David Phelps	Pitcher	Right	March 2018	
Branden Pinder	Pitcher	Right	April 26, 2016	
Michael Pineda	Pitcher	Right	July 18, 2017	
Colin Poche	Pitcher	Left	June 23, 2014; July 29, 2020	
Bill Pulsipher	Pitcher	Left	April 17, 1996	
Zach Putnam	Pitcher	Right	June 2017	
J. C. Ramírez	Pitcher	Right	April 2018	
Drew Rasmussen	Pitcher	Right	March 2016; September 2017	
Robbie Ray	Pitcher	Left	May 3, 2023	
Colin Rea	Pitcher	Right	November 10, 2016	
Sean Reid-Foley	Pitcher	Right	May 11, 2022	
Al Reyes	Pitcher	Right	1995; 2005	
Alex Reyes	Pitcher	Right	February 16, 2017	
Anthony Reyes	Pitcher	Right	2009	
Arthur Rhodes	Pitcher	Left	May 2, 2007	
Frank Riccelli	Pitcher	Left	1979	
Jerrod Riggan	Pitcher	Right	June 29, 2004	
José Rijo	Pitcher	Right	1995; 1997	
T.J. Rivera	Infielder	Right	September 14, 2017	
David Robertson	Pitcher	Right	August 15, 2019	
Nate Robertson	Pitcher	Left	1998	
Brady Rodgers	Pitcher	Right	May 2, 2017	
Fernando Rodney	Pitcher	Right	April 29, 2004	
Jake Rogers	Catcher	Right	September 8, 2021	
Jordan Romano	Pitcher	Right	April 2015	
Fernando Romero	Pitcher	Right	2014	
JoJo Romero	Pitcher	Left	May 25, 2021	
Héctor Rondón	Pitcher	Right	August 2010	
Trevor Rosenthal	Pitcher	Right	August 2017	
Joe Ross	Pitcher	Right	July 19, 2017	
Hyun-jin Ryu	Pitcher	Left	2004; June 18, 2022	
Danny Salazar	Pitcher	Right	2010	
Chris Sale	Pitcher	Left	March 2020	
Aníbal Sánchez	Pitcher	Right	2003	
Miguel Sano	Third baseman	Right	March 12, 2014	
Scott Schoeneweis	Pitcher	Left	1994	
Bo Schultz	Pitcher	Right	March 29, 2017	
Corey Seager	Shortstop	Right	May 4, 2018	
Jae Seo	Pitcher	Right	May 1999	
Luis Severino	Pitcher	Right	February 27, 2020	
Kevin Shackelford	Pitcher	Right	June 2018	
Ben Sheets	Pitcher	Right	August 2010	
Ryan Sherriff	Pitcher	Left	June 5, 2018	
Jason Shiell	Pitcher	Right	May 2004	
Bill Simas	Pitcher	Right	2000	
Shae Simmons	Pitcher	Right	February 12, 2015	
Tyler Skaggs	Pitcher	Left	August 13, 2014	
Carson Smith	Pitcher	Right	May 24, 2016	
Will Smith	Pitcher	Left	March 30, 2017	
John Smoltz	Pitcher	Right	March 23, 2000	
Drew Smyly	Pitcher	Left	July 6, 2017	
Joakim Soria	Pitcher	Right	April 2003; March 2012	
Rafael Soriano	Pitcher	Right	August 17, 2004	
Glenn Sparkman	Pitcher	Right	2015	
Steve Sparks	Pitcher	Right	1997	
Tim Spooneybarger	Pitcher	Right	2003	
Jason Stanford	Pitcher	Left	July 29, 2004	
Drew Storen	Pitcher	Right	September 2017	
Stephen Strasburg	Pitcher	Right	September 3, 2010	
Scott Strickland	Pitcher	Right	June 2003	
Ross Stripling	Pitcher	Right	March 2014	
Brent Strom	Pitcher	Left	1978	
Tyler Sturdevant	Pitcher	Right	2007	
Brent Suter	Pitcher	Left	July 31, 2018	
Noah Syndergaard	Pitcher	Right	March 26, 2020	
Jameson Taillon	Pitcher	Right	April 2014; August 13, 2019	
Craig Tatum	Catcher	Right	2005	
Taylor Teagarden	Catcher	Right	November 2005	
Tomás Telis	Catcher	Right	2010	
Jesen Therrien	Pitcher	Right	September 2017	
Drew Thorpe	Pitcher	Right	March 2025	
Shawn Tolleson	Pitcher	Right	2007; May 17, 2017	
Josh Tomlin	Pitcher	Right	August 21, 2012	
Gleyber Torres	Infielder	Right†	June 2017	
Billy Traber	Pitcher	Left	September 21, 2003	
Lou Trivino	Pitcher	Right	May 3, 2023	
Nick Tropeano	Pitcher	Right	August 4, 2016	
John Tudor	Pitcher	Left	October 27, 1988	
Spencer Turnbull	Pitcher	Right	2021	
Jason Vargas	Pitcher	Left	August 2015	
Christian Vázquez	Catcher	Right	April 2, 2015	
Jonny Venters	Pitcher	Left	2005; May 16, 2013; September 2014	
Justin Verlander	Pitcher	Right	September 30, 2020	
Frank Viola	Pitcher	Left	May 17, 1994	
Edinson Vólquez	Pitcher	Right	August 3, 2009; August 4, 2017	
Tsuyoshi Wada	Pitcher	Left	May 11, 2012	
Billy Wagner	Pitcher	Left	September 10, 2008	
Neil Wagner	Pitcher	Right	August 2014	
Adam Wainwright	Pitcher	Right	February 28, 2011	
Taijuan Walker	Pitcher	Right	April 25, 2018	
Daniel Webb	Pitcher	Right	June 2016	
Logan Webb	Pitcher	Right	June 2016	
Duke Welker	Pitcher	Right	June 5, 2014	
David Wells	Pitcher	Left	1985	
Hayden Wesneski	Pitcher	Right	May 2025	
Jake Westbrook	Pitcher	Right	June 2008	
Zack Wheeler	Pitcher	Right	March 2015	
Bob Wickman	Pitcher	Right	December 9, 2002	
Matt Wieters	Catcher	Right	June 17, 2014	
Keaton Winn	Pitcher	Right	2021	
Chase Whitley	Pitcher	Right	May 19, 2015	
Garrett Whitlock	Pitcher	Right	July 2019	
Mac Williamson	Outfielder	Right	April 29, 2014	
Scott Williamson	Pitcher	Right	2001	
Brian Wilson	Pitcher	Right	2003; April 19, 2012	
C. J. Wilson	Pitcher	Left	August 11, 2003	
Justin Wilson	Pitcher	Left	June 3, 2022	
Paul Wilson	Pitcher	Right	April 1, 1999	
Vance Wilson	Catcher	Right	2007; 2008	
Trey Wingenter	Pitcher	Right	July 2020	
Mark Wohlers	Pitcher	Right	July 6, 1999; August 1, 2003	
Randy Wolf	Pitcher	Left	July 1, 2005; October 2012	
Blake Wood	Pitcher	Right	May 18, 2012; May 2018	
Tony Womack	Infielder	Right	October 6, 2003	
Kerry Wood	Pitcher	Right	April 8, 1999	
Brandon Workman	Pitcher	Right	June 15, 2015	
Tim Worrell	Pitcher	Right	May 12, 1994	
Todd Worrell	Pitcher	Right	December 1, 1989	
Kirby Yates	Pitcher	Right	2006; March 24, 2021	
Tyler Yates	Pitcher	Right	2002; July 16, 2009	
Danny Young	Pitcher	Left	May 2009	
Víctor Zambrano	Pitcher	Right	1996; May 15, 2006	
Jeff Zimmerman	Pitcher	Right	2002; 2004	
Jordan Zimmermann	Pitcher	Right	August 2009	
Joel Zumaya	Pitcher	Right	March 2012	
