= 1904 Connecticut lieutenant gubernatorial election =

- November 8, 1904
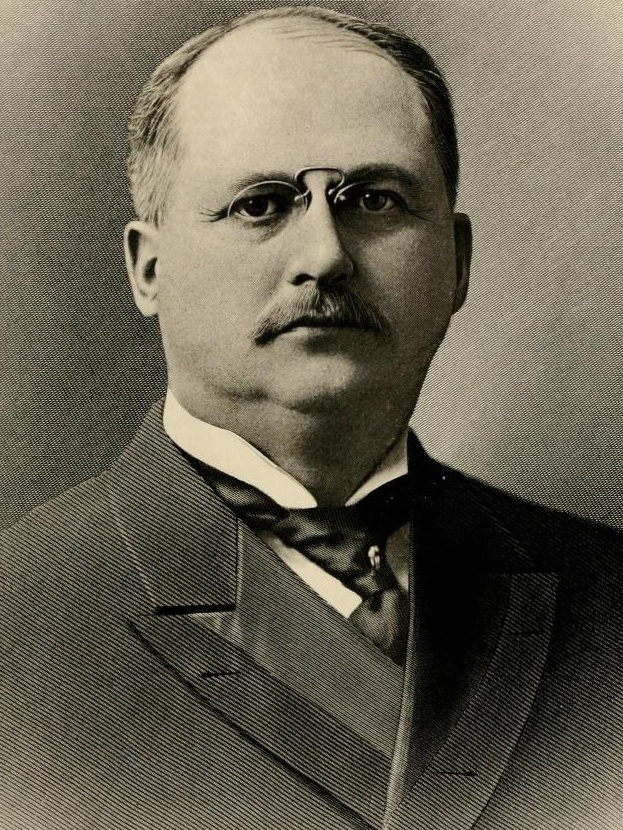

Nominee	Rollin S. Woodruff	Henry Alfred Bishop
Party	Republican	Democratic
Popular vote	108,628	75,383
Percentage	59.00%	41.00%
Lieutenant Governor before election
Henry Roberts
Republican
Elected Lieutenant Governor
Rollin S. Woodruff
Republican

The 1904 Connecticut lieutenant gubernatorial election was held on November 8, 1904, to elect the lieutenant governor of Connecticut. Republican nominee and incumbent President pro tempore of the Connecticut Senate Rollin S. Woodruff won the election against Democratic nominee and former member of the Connecticut House of Representatives Henry Alfred Bishop.

== General election ==
On election day, November 8, 1904, Republican nominee Rollin S. Woodruff won the election with 59.00% of the vote, thereby retaining Republican control over the office of lieutenant governor. Woodruff was sworn in as the 71st lieutenant governor of Connecticut on January 4, 1905.

=== Results ===
Connecticut lieutenant gubernatorial election, 1904
Party	Candidate	Votes	%
Republican	Rollin S. Woodruff	108,628	59.00
Democratic	Henry Alfred Bishop	75,383	41.00
Total votes		184,011	100.00
Republican hold			
