= Edward Bishopp =

Edward Bishopp may refer to:

- Sir Edward Bishopp, 2nd Baronet (1602–1649), MP for Bletchingley, Bramber and Steyning
- Sir Edward Bishopp, 11th Baronet (1826–1870), of the Bishopp baronets

== See also ==
- Edward Bishop (disambiguation)
- Bishopp (surname)
