= Harry Bishop =

Harry Bishop may refer to:

- Harry Bishop (politician) (c. 1869–1920), Alaskan politician
- Harry Gore Bishop (1874–1934), American writer

== See also ==
- Henry Bishop (disambiguation)
- Harold Bishop (disambiguation)
