= Thomas Bishop =

Thomas Bishop may refer to:

- Thomas Bishop (MP) (by 1506–1560), English politician
- Thomas Bishop (rower) (born 1947), British Olympic rower
- Thomas B. Bishop (1840–1906), San Francisco attorney
- Thomas Brigham Bishop (1835–1905), American composer of popular music
- Thomas Otto Bishop (1877–1952), New Zealand politician
- Thomas Bishop (Tompkins County, NY), member of the 56th New York State Legislature in 1833
- Thomas O. Bishop, member of the New York State Assembly in 1850
- Thomas P. Bishop, member of the New York State Assembly in 1857
- Tommy Bishop (born 1940), English rugby player
- Tom Bishop (triathlete) (born 1991), British triathlete
- Tom Bishop (basketball), Canadian basketball player, played in 1970s

== See also ==
- Thomas Bishopp (disambiguation)
- Bishop (surname)
