= Church of the Epiphany (Washington, D.C.) =

Historic church in Washington, D.C., United States

- The Church of the Epiphany
- U.S. National Register of Historic Places
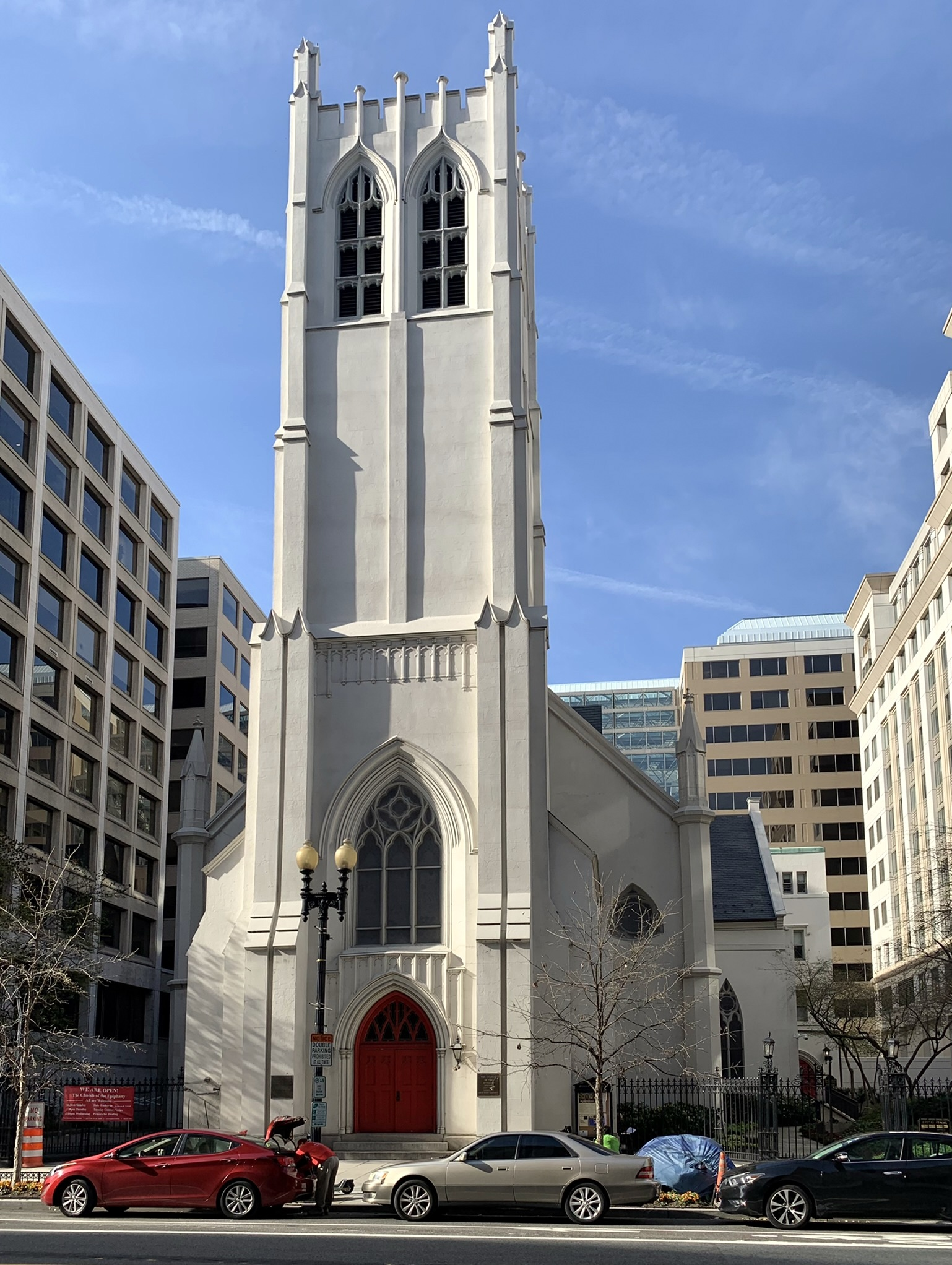
- Church of the Epiphany in 2022

- Location within Central Washington, D.C. Location within the District of Columbia Location within the United States
- Location: 1317 G Street, N.W. Washington, D.C.
- Coordinates: 38°53′55″N 77°1′49.7″W
- Built: 1844
- NRHP reference No.: 71000996
- Added to NRHP: September 10, 1971

The Church of the Epiphany, built in 1844, is an historic Episcopal church located at 1317 G Street, N.W., in Washington, D.C. It was added to the National Register of Historic Places on September 10, 1971. The church reported 319 members in 2015 and 173 members in 2023; no membership statistics were reported in 2024 parochial reports. Plate and pledge income reported for the congregation in 2024 was $498,037. Average Sunday attendance (ASA) in 2024 was 43 persons.

The parish was organized in 1842, and the new building consecrated in 1852. During the next five years, a tower, transepts and chancel were added. In 1858, the congregation established the Epiphany Church home to help the poor and sick. The American Civil War split the congregation. As Senator, Jefferson Davis had rented pew number 14, and three of his children were confirmed at the church. After secession, when Davis moved to Richmond, Virginia and became the Confederacy's president, that pew was rented by Secretary of War Edwin Stanton. On March 6, 1862, President Abraham Lincoln attended the funeral of General Frederick Lander at this church, which also served as a hospital between May and December of that year.

Soprano and conductor Virginia Goodwin McRoberts was appointed choir director at the church in 1912; a post she had previously served in prior to her marriage in 1906. She was still conductor at the church as late as 1928.

== National Register listing ==
- Church of the Epiphany ** (added 1971 - Building - #71000996)
- 1317 G St., NW., Washington
- Historic Significance: Event, Architecture/Engineering
- Architect, builder, or engineer: Harkness, John W.
- Architectural Style: Gothic Revival
- Area of Significance: Religion, Architecture
- Period of Significance: 1825–1849, 1850–1874
- Owner: Private
- Historic Function: Religion
- Historic Sub-function: Religious Structure
- Current Function: Religion
- Current Sub-function: Religious Structure

== See also ==
- List of Registered Historic Places in the District of Columbia
