= Harold Bishop (disambiguation) =

Harold Bishop is a fictional character from the Australian soap opera Neighbours.

Harold Bishop may also refer to:

- Harold Bishop (American football) (born 1970), American football player
- Harold Bishop (engineer), (1900–1983), broadcasting engineer
- Harold Bishop Elementary School, Surrey, British Columbia

== See also ==
- Harry Bishop (disambiguation)
