= Bishop (disambiguation) =

A bishop is a Christian cleric of authority.

Bishop, Bishops, Bishop's, or The Bishop may also refer to:

== Places ==
=== Antarctica ===
- Bishop Peak (Antarctica)
- Mount Bishop (Antarctica)

=== Australia ===
- Bishop Island (Queensland), an island

=== Canada ===
- Bishop Island, Nunavut
- Bishop River, British Columbia
- Bishop Street, Montreal, Quebec, Canada
- Mount Bishop (Camelsfoot Range), British Columbia
- Mount Bishop (Elk Range), on the British Columbia–Alberta boundary
- Mount Bishop (Fannin Range), British Columbia

=== United Kingdom ===
- Bishop Auckland, a town in County Durham, England, a.k.a. "Bishop"
- Bishop's ward, in the London Borough of Lambeth

=== United States ===
- Bishop, California, a city
- Bishop, Georgia, a small town
- Bishop, Illinois, an unincorporated community
- Bishop, Maryland, an unincorporated community
- Cecil, an unincorporated community in Cecil-Bishop, Pennsylvania, a census-designated place
- Bishop, Texas, a city
- Bishop, Virginia and West Virginia, an unincorporated community
- Bishop, Washington, a ghost town
- Bishop Arts District, Dallas
- Bishop Paiute Tribe reservation
- Bishop Peak (California)
- Bishop Subbasin, an aquifer in California
- Bishop's Block, Iowa, a building

== People ==
- Bishop (surname)
- The Bishop, pseudonym of John Tomkins, a convicted American extortionist
- Robert Bishop (artist), bondage artist, known by the pseudonym "Bishop"
- Bishop Davenport (born 2003), American football player

== Animals ==
- Bishop, birds of the genus Euplectes in the Weaver family, Ploceidae
- Bishops (mammal), genus of Mesozoic mammals in the family Ausktribosphenidae

== Arts, entertainment, and media ==
=== Fictional characters ===
- Bishop (Aliens), in the Alien series of films, played by Lance Henriksen
- Bishop (Marvel Comics), in Marvel Comics' X-Men books
- Bishop, in the film Juice, played by Tupac Shakur
- Bishop, a Fangire in the 2008 series Kamen Rider Kiva
- Bishop, in Tom Clancy's Rainbow Six: Vegas 2
- Bishop, in the computer game Ultima Underworld II: Labyrinth of Worlds (1993)
- Bishop, a character class in the game Wizardry
- Obispo "Bishop" Losa, a main character in the FX television series Mayans M.C.
- The Bishop (Monty Python), a secret agent in a Monty Python skit

=== Literature ===
- The Bishop (novel), a 1970 novel by Scottish writer Bruce Marshall
- "The Bishop" (short story), a 1902 short story by Anton Chekhov

=== Music ===
- Bishop (band), a Straight Edge hardcore band from Florida
- The Bishops, a British band
- Bishop Briggs, stage name of British-American singer and songwriter Sarah Grace McLaughlin (born 1992)
- Bishop Don "Magic" Juan (born 1950), American entertainer

== Schools ==
- Bishop College, Marshall, Texas, United States, a historically black college
- Bishop State Community College, Mobile, Alabama, United States
- Bishop's University, Sherbrooke, Quebec, Canada
- Diocesan College, also known as Bishops, a private school in Rondebosch in Cape Town, South Africa
- The Bishop's School, La Jolla, California, United States, an Episcopal day school
- The Bishop's Education Society, Pune, India, a private school

== Other uses ==
- Bishop (chess), a chess piece that moves diagonally
- Bishop Airport (disambiguation)
- Bishop (artillery), a British Second World War self-propelled gun
- Bishop, a form of mulled wine
- Bishop, a type of sleeve
- Bishop Museum, Honolulu, Hawaii, United States

== See also ==
- Bishops' Wars of 1639 and 1640, wars in Scotland and England generally viewed as the starting point of the 1639–1652 Wars of the Three Kingdoms
