= Bishop Bishop =

Bishop Bishop may refer to:

- William Bishop (bishop) (c. 1553–1624), Roman Catholic Vicar Apostolic of England
- Jim Bishop (bishop) (1908–1994), Anglican Bishop suffragan of Malmesbury
- Ian Bishop (bishop) (born 1962), Anglican Bishop Suffragan of Thetford
- John Climping (died 1262), medieval Catholic Bishop of Chichester, was also known as "John Bishop"

== See also ==
- Bishop, an ecclesiastical leadership position
- Bishop (surname)
