= Arthur Bishop =

Arthur Bishop may refer to:

- Arthur Bishop (cricketer) (1863–1931), English cricketer
- Arthur Ernest Bishop (1917–2006), Australian engineer and inventor
- Arthur Gary Bishop (1952–1988), convicted American child molester and serial killer
- Arthur Bishop, protagonist in the 1972 film The Mechanic, and its remakes
