= Thomas Bishopp =

Thomas Bishopp may refer to:

- Sir Thomas Bishopp, 1st Baronet (c. 1550–1626) of the Bishopp baronets, MP for Gatton and Steyning
- Sir Thomas Bishopp, 3rd Baronet (1627–1652) of the Bishopp baronets

== See also ==
- Thomas Bishop (disambiguation)
- Bishopp (surname)
