= Virginia Powell Goodwin =

1896 sketch of Virginia Powell Goodwin. Published in The Washington Post.

Virginia Powell Goodwin, also known by her married name Virginia Goodwin McRoberts, (29 March 1876 - 3 February 1960) was an American soprano and choral director. A native of Union Springs, Alabama, she was educated at the Norwood Institute in Washington D.C. and trained as a musician in that city by John W. Bischoff. She was a pioneering recording artist with Berliner Gramophone for whom she made recordings from 1895 to 1899. She worked as a church singer and choral conductor at churches in Washington D.C. prior to her marriage to attorney Charles Gregory McRoberts in 1906. After her husband's death in a hunting accident in 1911 she was a longtime choir director at Church of the Epiphany, District of Columbia. She moved to Florida in 1943 and died there in 1960.

== Biography ==
=== Early life, family, and education ===
The daughter of James Mather Goodwin and Eugenia H. Goodwin (nee Blackmon), Virginia Powell Goodwin was born in Union Springs, Alabama on 29 March 1876. Her father was from a socially prominent family in Hartford, Connecticut and moved to Alabama prior to the American Civil War. His ancestor was Ozias Goodwin who was a founder of the city of Hartford. On her mother's side of the family, Virginia was a niece of Richard Holmes Powell; a banker, plantation owner, and Captain in the 3rd Alabama Infantry Regiment of the Confederate States Army. He was wounded at the Battle of Malvern Hill.

Goodwin was educated at the Norwood Institute, a private girl's boarding school in Washington D.C. She graduated from that school in June 1894. She was trained as a soprano by the Washington D.C. organist and choir director John W. Bischoff.

=== Soprano, choir director, and community leader ===
"Bobolink" sung by Virginia Powell Goodwin. 1898, Berliner Gramophone.

Goodwin made her public debut as a soprano performing at an art exhibition held at Washington D.C.'s Grand Army Hall in December 1894. She was active as a singer in Washington D.C. in public concerts organized by her teacher, Bischoff, in the 1890s.

Goodwin was part of a group of pioneering recording artists with the Berliner Gramophone (BG) in this period; with the Discography of American Historical Recordings cataloguing her earliest known recording, the song "Se saran rose", to sometime before May 1895. She was paid five dollars by BG to record a group of songs in March 1898. These included recordings of Luigi Arditi and Gottardo Aldighieri's coloratura vocal waltz "Il bacio", Arditi's "Magnetic Waltz" (a.k.a. "L'Ardita"), Alexander Alyabyev's "The Nightingale", Richard Mulder's "Staccato Polka", the song "Bobolink" (possibly composed by Mulder), and the song "Che gioja".

Despite her obscurity as a singer outside of Washington D.C., BG marketed Goodwin's recordings by proclaiming her a singer "known all over the world". She made four more recording with BG sometime after March 1898 and before April 1899; including "Berceuse", "Who Will Buy My Roses Red", "Mona", and "Red white and blue".

In 1897 Goodwin was president of the Nellie Custis Chapter (NCC) of the Daughters of the American Revolution which held its meetings at that time in Goodwin's home at 28 Iowa Circle (now Logan Circle). In February 1897 she was a soloist in a patriotic concert given at the Columbia Theatre under the auspices of the Children of the American Revolution. She also directed a flag drill performance given by the NCC at this event following a speech delivered by Maine's United States Senator William P. Frye which denounced Spain in support of the Cuban War of Independence.

Prior to getting married, Goodwin worked as a church choir director at St. Andrew's Episcopal Church and the Church of the Epiphany in Washington, D.C. She also worked as a soprano on the music staff at First Congregational Church in Washington D.C. until resigning from that position at the time of her marriage in 1906. She married Charles Gregory McRoberts at Christ Church, Washington Parish on April 26, 1906. She moved with her husband to Chicago after the wedding. Her husband, than an Assistant United States Attorney, was killed in a hunting accident 1911. After his death, Goodwin returned to Washington D.C. and rejoined the music staff at Church of the Epiphany in September 1912 as choir director. She was still in this post as late as April 1928. The February 19, 1929 edition of Washington Times Herald named her in a list of "leading musicians and choral directors" in the District of Columbia.

In October 1918 Goodwin and her sister Beatrice returned to Union Springs, Alabama to attend the funeral of their mother. In May 1921 she performed the song "Red Cross Nurse" in a special "Alabama Day" concert/event held at Walter Reed Hospital under the auspices of the Alabama State Society (ASS). She was music director for another ASS event the following month, conducting others in performing what The Washington Herald described as "old melodies". In 1927 she organized a special luncheon in Washington D.C. honoring the American choral director John Finley Williamson.

=== Later life in Florida ===
Virginia Goodwin McRoberts moved to Winter Park, Florida in 1943. She died at a hospital in Orange County, Florida on 3 February 1960.
