= John Bishop (disambiguation) =

John Bishop (born 1966) is an English comedian.

John Bishop may also refer to:

- John Bishop (19th century), body snatcher, one of the London Burkers
- John Bishop (academic) (1903–1964), Australian academic and conductor
- John Bishop, American jazz drummer and founder of Origin Records
- John Bishop (cricketer) (1891–1963), English cricketer
- John Bishop (editor), head of Harvard Journal of Asiatic Studies, 1958–1974
- John Bishop, founder of Dreamland Bar-B-Que
- John Bishop, founder of US based motorsport sanctioning body, International Motor Sports Association
- John Bishop (MP), Member of Parliament (MP) for Wycombe in 1430
- John Bishop (publisher) (1931–2000), British founder of Thames Publishing
- John Bishop (screenwriter) (1929–2006), Broadway playwright and director and Hollywood screenwriter
- John Bishop (sportscaster), American play-by-play broadcaster
- John Bishop (surgeon) (1797–1873), English surgeon and medical writer
- John A. Bishop, former mayor of Whitehall, Ohio (1970s-1990s)
- John Melville Bishop (born 1946), American documentary filmmaker
- J. Michael Bishop (1936–2026), American immunologist and microbiologist
- John Peale Bishop (1892–1944), American poet
- John Bisshop, MP for Gloucestershire from 1305 to 1313

== See also ==
- John Climping (died 1262), medieval Catholic Bishop of Chichester, was also known as "John Bishop"
- John Bishop House, listed on the National Register of Historic Places in 1985
- John Bishop Estlin (1785–1855), English ophthalmic surgeon
