= Bischof =

Bischof (German: bishop) is a surname. Notable people with the surname include:

- Gustav Bischof (1792–1870), German chemist
- Horst Bischof (born 1967), Austrian computer scientist
- Frank-Peter Bischof (born 1954), German canoeist
- Werner Bischof (1916–1954), Swiss photographer
- Kerstin Bischof (born 1980), German singer, vocalist of Xandria

== See also ==
- Bischoff
- Bishop
