= Bishoff =

Surname list

Bishoff is a surname. Notable people with the surname include:

- Heather Bishoff, American politician
- Murray Bishoff, American writer

== See also ==
- Bischoff
