= Alfred Bishop =

Alfred or Alf Bishop may refer to:

- Alf Bishop (footballer, born 1884) (1884–1938), English footballer with Wolverhampton Wanderers
- Alf Bishop (footballer, born 1902) (1902–1944), English footballer with Southampton and Barrow
- Henry Alfred Bishop (1860–1934), American politician and railroad man
