= Alison Bishop =

Alison Bishop may refer to:

- Alison Mason Kingsbury (1898–1988), American artist
- Alison Jolly (1937–2014), American primatologist
- Alison Lurie (1926–2020), American novelist and academic
- Alison Bishop, character played by Elizabeth Franz
