= Chris Bishop (disambiguation) =

Chris or Christopher Bishop may refer to:

- Christopher Bishop (born 1959), British computer scientist
- Chris Bishop (born 1983), New Zealand politician
- Christopher J. Bishop, American mathematician
