= Arthur Bishop (cricketer) =

English cricketer (1863–1931)

Arthur Theodore Bishop (2 September 1863 – 8 September 1931) was an English first-class cricketer active 1883 who played for Middlesex. He was born in Stratford, Essex; died in St John's Wood.
