= Walter Bishop =

Walter Bishop may refer to:

- Walter Bishop Sr. (1905–1984), Jamaican composer and songwriter
- Walter Bishop Jr. (1927–1998), American bop and hard bop jazz pianist, son of the above
- Walter Bishop (Fringe), character in the television show Fringe
