= Bishop Airport =

Bishop Airport may refer to:

== Canada ==
- Billy Bishop Toronto City Airport, serving Toronto, Ontario, Canada (IATA: YTZ/ICAO: CYTZ)
- Owen Sound Billy Bishop Regional Airport, serving Owen Sound, Ontario, Canada (IATA: YOS/ICAO: CYOS)

== Grenada ==
- Maurice Bishop International Airport, serving St. George's, Grenada (IATA: GND/ICAO: TGPY)

== United States ==
- Bishop Airport (Decatur, Texas), serving Decatur, Texas, United States (FAA LID: 76T)
- Bishop International Airport, serving Flint, Michigan, United States (IATA: FNT/ICAO: KFNT)
- Bishop Municipal Airport, serving Bishop, Texas, United States (FAA LID: 07R)
- Eastern Sierra Regional Airport, serving Bishop, California, United States (IATA: BIH/ICAO: KBIH)
