= Stephen Bishop =

Stephen or Steve Bishop may refer to:

- Stephen Bishop (actor) (born 1970), American baseball player and actor
- Stephen Bishop (cave explorer) (1821–1857), African American cave explorer
- Stephen Bishop (singer) (born 1951), American pop singer
- Stephen Kovacevich (born 1940), concert pianist, formerly named Stephen Bishop
- Stephen Bishop (born 1983), chaplain and potential candidate in Louisiana gubernatorial election, 2019
- Steven Bishop (born 1970), Australian drummer
- Steve Bishop (speedway rider) (born 1963), English motorcycle speedway rider
