= Michael Matuella =

American baseball player (born 1994)

- Pitcher
- Born: June 3, 1994 (age 32); Great Falls, Virginia, U.S.
- Bats: Right Throws: Right
- Stats at Baseball Reference

Michael Benjamin Matuella (born June 3, 1994) is an American former professional baseball pitcher. He played college baseball for the Duke Blue Devils. He was drafted by the Texas Rangers in the third round of the 2015 MLB draft.

== Amateur career ==
Born and raised in the Philadelphia metropolitan area, Matuella's family moved to Great Falls, Virginia. He attended Georgetown Preparatory School in North Bethesda, Maryland, across the Potomac River. He was lightly recruited out of high school and only received offers to play college baseball at Duke University and the University of Maryland. He chose to play for the Duke Blue Devils.

As a freshman in 2013, he appeared in 22 games with seven starts. He had a 4–4 win–loss record with a 4.53 earned run average (ERA) and 28 strikeouts over 57 2/3 innings pitched. In 2013, he played collegiate summer baseball in the Cape Cod Baseball League for the Yarmouth-Dennis Red Sox. As a sophomore in 2014, Matuella started 11 games, going 1–3 with a 2.78 ERA and 69 strikeouts over 58 1/3 innings. After the season, he was diagnosed with spondylolysis, which caused him to not pitch during the summer or fall.

Entering his junior season, Matuella was considered one of the top prospects for the 2015 Major League Baseball draft. Prior to the season he was named a preseason All-American by Baseball America. In April it was announced that he would need Tommy John surgery, which ended his junior season. He pitched only 25 innings as a junior.

== Professional career ==
The Texas Rangers selected Matuella in the third round, with the 78th overall selection, of the 2015 Major League Baseball draft. He signed with the Rangers, receiving a $2 million signing bonus. Matuella did not play in 2015 due to recovery from Tommy John surgery, and his 2016 season was cut short after one game with the Spokane Indians of the Low-A Northwest League due to a sprained ligament in his right elbow.

Matuella spent the first month of the 2017 season on the disabled list, but still pitched in 21 games, posting a 4–6 record with a 4.20 ERA with 60 strikeouts for the Hickory Crawdads of the Single-A South Atlantic League. Matuella spent the 2018 season with the Down East Wood Ducks of the High-A Carolina League, and struggled throughout the season, posting a 3–5 record with a 8.24 ERA and 44 strikeouts in 51 1/3 innings across 20 games (eight starts). He was assigned back to Down East for the 2019 season, going 5–2 with a 4.04 ERA and 52 strikeouts over 42 1/3 innings of work. Matuella did not play in a game in 2020 due to the cancellation of the Minor League Baseball season because of the COVID-19 pandemic. Matuella was released by the Rangers organization on May 13, 2021.
