= Seth Scott Bishop =

American physician

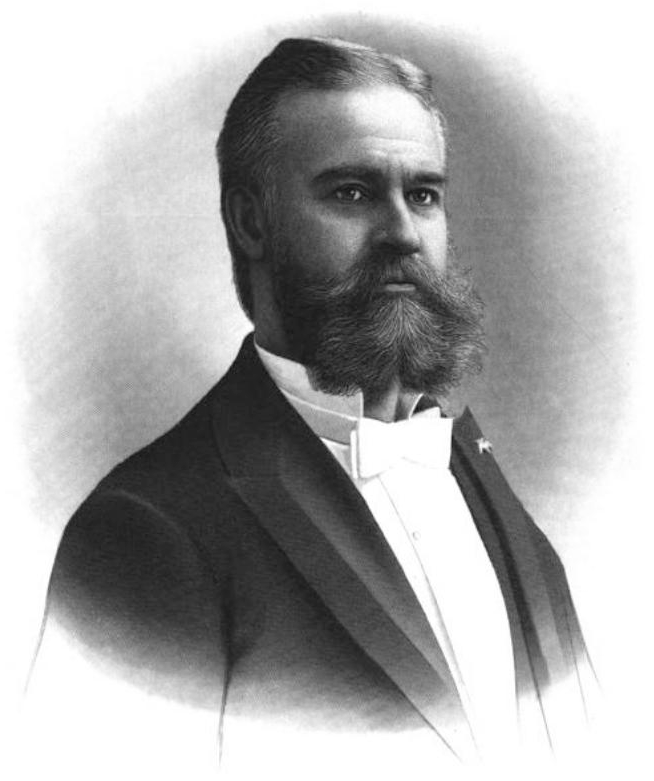
- Born: February 7, 1852; Fond du Lac, Wisconsin
- Died: September 6, 1923 (aged 71); Evanston, Illinois
- Burial place: Graceland Cemetery
- Education: Northwestern University School of Medicine
- Occupation: Laryngologist
- Spouse: Jessie Abagail Button (m. 1885)
- Children: 2

Seth Scott Bishop (February 7, 1852 – September 6, 1923) was a United States laryngologist. He practiced in Chicago.

== Biography ==
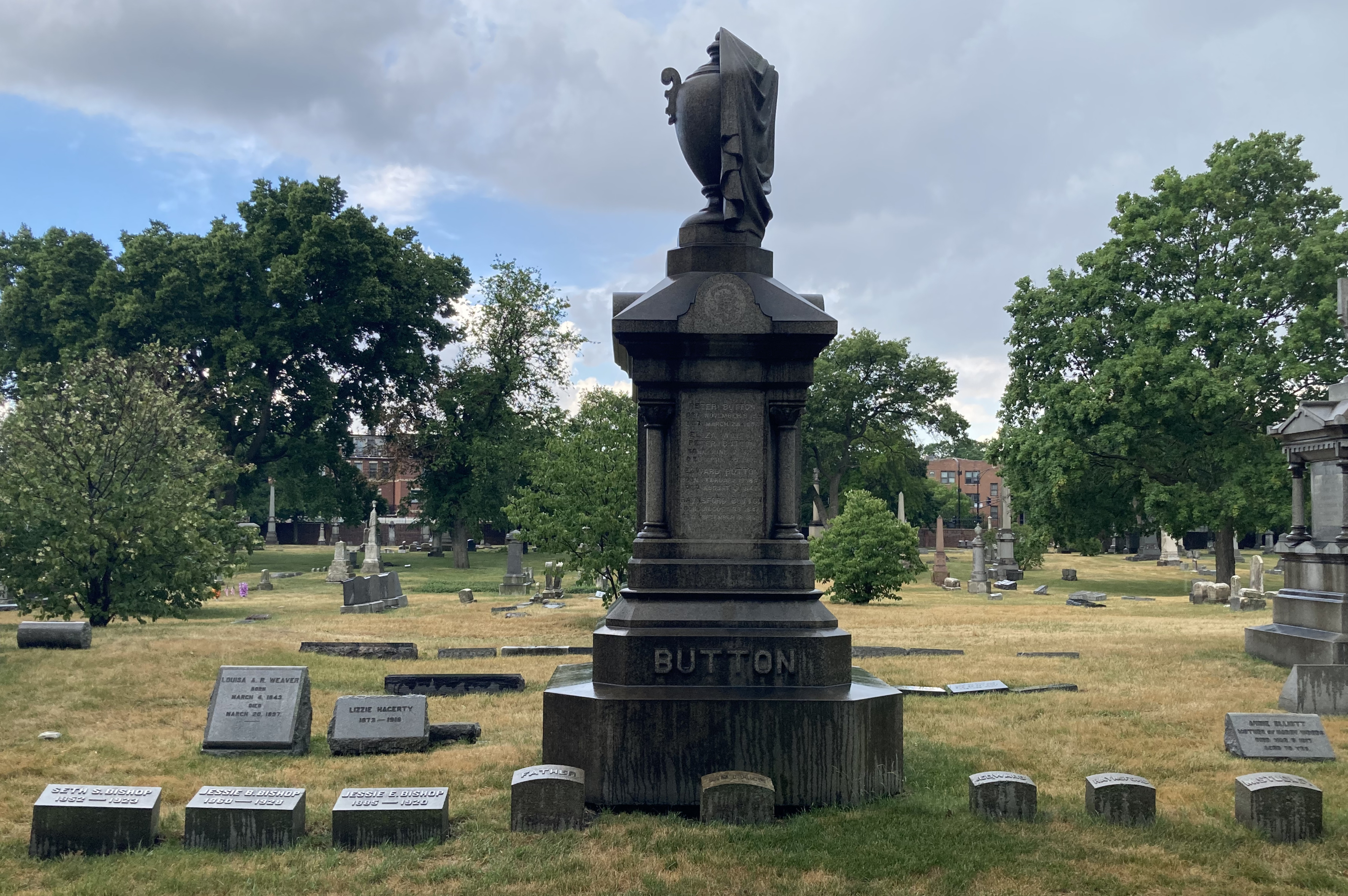
Bishop's grave (front, leftmost) at Graceland Cemetery

Seth Scott Bishop was born at Fond du Lac, Wisconsin on February 7, 1852. He graduated in 1876 at the Northwestern University School of Medicine, and subsequently was appointed professor of otology at the Chicago Post-Graduate Medical School and Hospital and professor of diseases of the nose, throat, and ear at the Illinois Medical College.

He married Jessie Abagail Button on March 23, 1885, and they had two children.

He died at his home in Evanston, Illinois on September 6, 1923, and was buried at Graceland Cemetery.

== Literary activity ==
He became an editor of The Laryngoscope, and published a work on Diseases of the Ear, Nose, and Throat, and Their Accessory Cavities (1897).
