= Edward Bishop =

Edward Bishop may refer to:

- Edward Bishop (Salem witch trials), sawyer involved in the Salem witch trials of 1692
- Edward Bishop, Baron Bishopston (1920–1984), British Labour Party politician
- Edward Bishop (cricketer) (1872–1943), Australian cricketer
- Edward Bishop (mayor) (1811–1887), mayor of Christchurch, New Zealand
- Edward Bishop (rugby union) (1864–1919), Wales international rugby union player
- Edward Bishop (EastEnders), a fictional character
- Ed Bishop (1932–2005), American actor
- Eddie Bishop (born 1961), English footballer
- Ted Bishop, Canadian actor and author
- Ted Bishop (golfer) (1913–1986), American golfer
- Teddy Bishop (born 1996), English footballer

== See also ==
- Edward Bishopp (disambiguation)
- Edward Bishop Dudley (1789–1855), Whig governor of North Carolina
- Edward Bishop Elliott (1793–1875), English theologian
