= Russell Bishop =

Russell Bishop may refer to:

- Russell Bishop (academic), New Zealand professor of Māori Education at the University of Waikato
- Russell Bishop (murderer) (1966–2022), British convicted child murderer and sex offender
