= Braden Bishop =

American baseball player (born 1993)

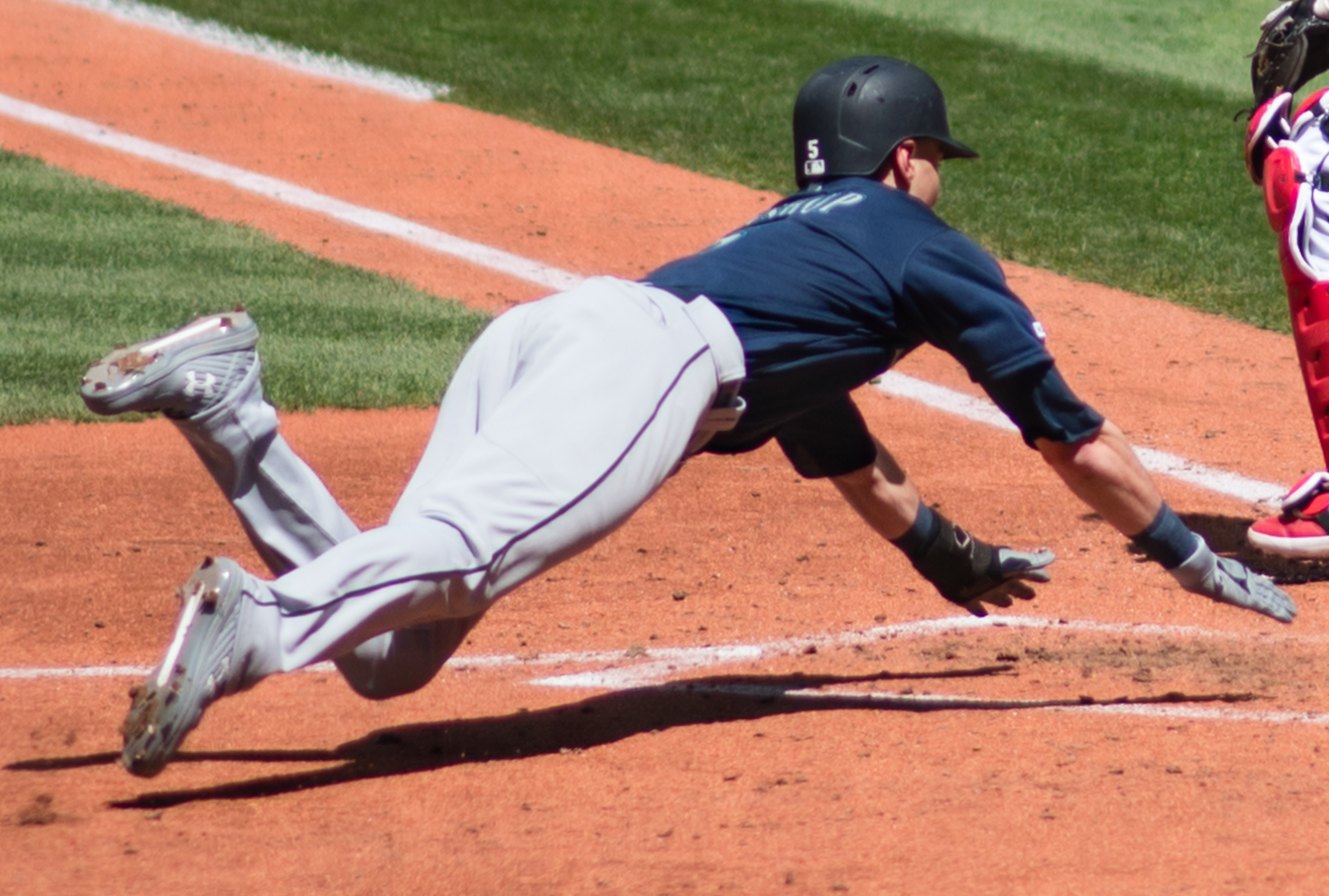
- Bishop with the Seattle Mariners in 2019
- Outfielder
- Born: August 22, 1993 (age 33); Woodland, California, U.S.
- Batted: Right Threw: Right

MLB debut
- March 21, 2019, for the Seattle Mariners

Last MLB appearance
- April 19, 2021, for the Seattle Mariners

MLB statistics
- Batting average: .133
- Home runs: 0
- Runs batted in: 8
- Stats at Baseball Reference

Teams
- Seattle Mariners (2019–2021)

Braden Adam Bishop (born August 22, 1993) is an American former professional baseball outfielder. He played in Major League Baseball (MLB) for the Seattle Mariners. He was drafted by the Mariners in the third round of the 2015 Major League Baseball draft out of the University of Washington.

== Early life and amateur career ==
Bishop was born in Woodland, California. His hometown is San Carlos, California. His father owns a private investigation company, and his mother, Suzy, ran track at UCLA and was a movie producer and head of the Vancouver Film School in Canada.

Bishop attended St. Francis High School in Mountain View, California.

Bishop attended the University of Washington in Seattle, where he played baseball for the Washington Huskies. In 2014, he batted .304/.394/.359 with 21 steals (leading the Pac-12 Conference) in 24 attempts. After the 2014 season, he played collegiate summer baseball with the Brewster Whitecaps of the Cape Cod Baseball League. In his senior year in college he was All-Pac-12 and selected to the All-Pac-12 Defensive Team.

== Professional career ==
=== Seattle Mariners ===
==== Minor leagues ====
Bishop was drafted by the Atlanta Braves in the 36th round of the 2012 Major League Baseball (MLB) draft out of high school, and by the Seattle Mariners in the third round of the 2015 MLB draft out of college.

Bishop signed with the Mariners and played in 2015 for the Everett AquaSox of the Low-A Northwest League, batting .320 (second in the league)/.367/.393 with two home runs, 22 RBI, and 13 stolen bases in 16 attempts, and he led the league with 12 HBP and 11 sacrifice hits. In August 2015 MLBPipeline.com ranked Bishop as the Mariners' #14 prospect. He was named Northwest League Player of the Week on August 24, 2015, a Northwest League Post-Season All Star, and an MILB.com organization All Star.

In 2016, Bishop played for the Clinton LumberKings of the Single-A Midwest League, and the Bakersfield Blaze of the High-A California League, batted a combined .273/.338/.326 with three home runs, 43 RBI, and 8 stolen bases in 9 attempts, and was named a California League All Star. MLBpipeline.com ranked him the #9 Mariners prospect.

In February 2017, MLB.com ranked Bishop the #6 Mariners prospect, the best defensive player in the organization, and tied for the best runner in the organization. Bishop began 2017 with the Modesto Nuts of the California League, batted .296/.385/.400 with two home runs, 32 RBI, and 16 steals in 20 attempts and was the MVP in the mid-season California League All Star Game, and was promoted to the Arkansas Travelers of the Double-A Texas League. In July 2017 Baseball America ranked him the #7 2017 mid-season prospect of the Mariners. With Arkansas, Bishop batted .336/.417/.448 with one home run, 11 RBI, and six stolen bases. In 2017 MLBpipeline.com ranked him the #5 Mariners prospect. The Seattle Times named Bishop the Mariners' 2017 Player of the Year, and he was named the Jewish Baseball News Minor League MVP. He played for the Peoria Javelinas in the Arizona Fall League in the fall of 2017, and was an AFL All Star.

In 2018, MLB.com ranked Bishop the #5 Mariners prospect. Playing for the Arkansas, who were members of the Double-A Texas League, he batted .284/.361/.412 with 70 runs (tied for 10th in the league), 8 home runs, and 33 RBI over 345 at-bats.

On November 16, 2018, the Mariners added Bishop to their 40-man roster to protect him from the Rule 5 draft.

==== Major leagues ====
On March 19, 2019, the Mariners announced that Bishop was included on their Opening Day roster. Bishop made his MLB debut on March 21 as a defensive replacement in the 8th inning, replacing Ichiro Suzuki in right field during Suzuki's final game. Bishop struck out in his first big league at-bat. On March 23, he was optioned to the Triple-A Tacoma Rainiers. In 2020, Bishop slashed .167/.242/.233 with five hits, four RBI, and one stolen base across 12 games.

After notching 1 hit in 5 plate appearances in 8 games, Bishop was designated for assignment on May 13, 2021.

=== San Francisco Giants ===
On May 17, 2021, Bishop was claimed off waivers by the San Francisco Giants. On May 22, Bishop was designated for assignment by San Francisco. He cleared waivers and was sent outright to the Triple-A Sacramento River Cats on May 26. In 288 at-bats for the River Cats, he batted .326/.388/.549 with 58 runs and 12 home runs. He became a free agent following the season.

=== Arizona Diamondbacks ===
On January 13, 2022, Bishop signed a minor league contract with the Arizona Diamondbacks. He began the season playing for the Triple-A Reno Aces. On June 7, 2022, Bishop was released.

=== Minnesota Twins ===
On June 18, 2022, Bishop signed a minor league contract with the Minnesota Twins. In 41 games for the Triple-A St. Paul Saints, he batted .229/.292/.390 with four home runs, 16 RBI, and five stolen bases. Bishop elected free agency following the season on November 10.

On March 3, 2023, Bishop formally announced his retirement from professional baseball via Instagram.

== Personal life ==
Bishop's younger brother Hunter is an outfielder who played in the minor leagues for the San Francisco Giants. Spurred by his mother Suzy's struggle with early onset Alzheimer's disease starting at age 54, Bishop has started a charity to spread awareness of the affliction known as “4Mom.” His mother died at age 59 in October 2019. The brothers are creating the "Suzy Bishop Memorial Grant" in their mother's honor, which will be gifted once a year to a family affected by Alzheimer's.

Bishop is married.
