= Hunter Bishop =

American baseball player (born 1998)

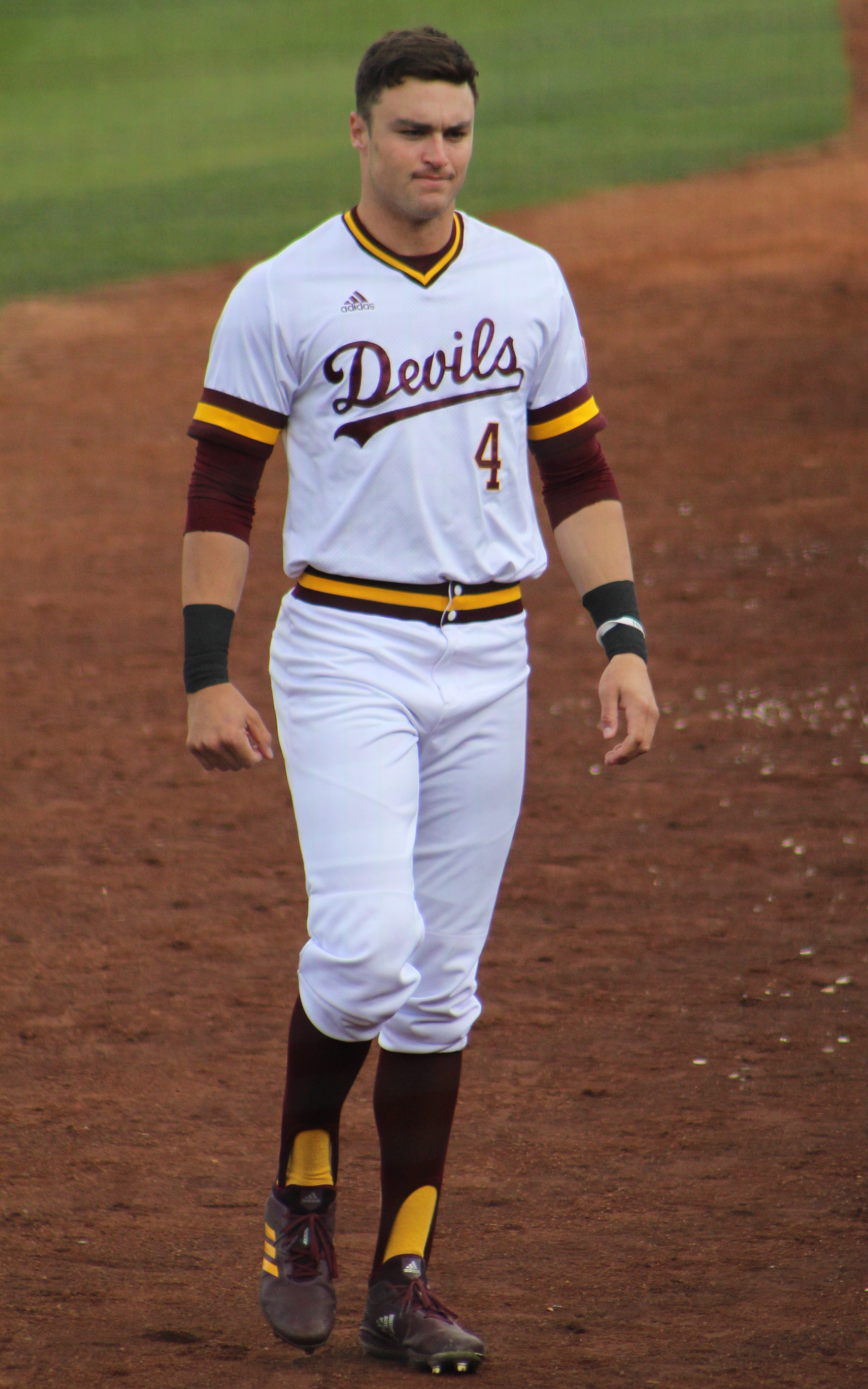
- Bishop at Arizona State in 2019

Free agent
- Outfielder
- Born: June 25, 1998 (age 28); San Carlos, California, U.S.
- Bats: Left Throws: Right
- Stats at Baseball Reference

Hunter David Bishop (born June 25, 1998) is an American professional baseball center fielder who is a free agent. He played college baseball at Arizona State University. He was selected by the San Francisco Giants with the 10th overall pick in the first round of the 2019 Major League Baseball draft.

== Early life ==
Hunter David Bishop was born on June 25, 1998, in San Carlos, California, and grew up in Palo Alto, California. He attended Saint Francis High School in Mountain View, California from 2012 to 2014, and Junípero Serra High School in San Mateo, California from 2014 to 2016, where he excelled in football and baseball. In his junior year he batted .348/.400/.435, and in his senior year he batted .426/.512/.663. In baseball he was 2015 Under Armour Baseball All-American, 2016 Rawlings-Perfect Game Honorable Mention All-American, 2016 Perfect Game Second-Team All-Region, and 2016 WCAL Baseball Player of the Year. He was First Team All-League in football as a wide receiver his senior year.

He originally committed to play college football at the University of Washington, but instead decided to play college baseball at Arizona State University. Bishop was drafted by the San Diego Padres in the 24th round of the 2016 Major League Baseball draft, but did not sign.

== College career ==
As a freshman at Arizona State in 2017, where he majored in Sports and Media Studies, Bishop batted .299/.360/.481 with four triples (tied for 5th in the Pac-12 Conference), five home runs and 25 runs batted in (RBIs) over 154 at bats in 51 games. He was named All-Conference Honorable Mention. As a sophomore in 2018, he hit .250/.352/.407 with five home runs and 26 RBIs over 140 at bats in 49 games. He was named Pac-12 Academic All-Conference. After the 2017 and 2018 seasons, he played collegiate summer baseball with the Brewster Whitecaps of the Cape Cod Baseball League, and in 2017 helped lead the club to the league championship and was named co-MVP of the league's playoffs.

In 2019 Bishop batted .342/.479 (5th in the league)/.748 (2nd; 8th in the nation) with 67 runs (4th), 16 doubles (tied for 7th), 4 triples (tied for 6th), 22 home runs (2nd; 5th in the nation), 62 RBIs (4th), 50 walks (4th), and 12 stolen bases (tied for 7th) over 222 at bats in 57 games. He was named Perfect Game and D1Baseball Midseason Player of the Year, First Team All-West Region by the ABCA, CoSIDA Academic All-American with a 3.41 GPA, and the NCBWA National Player of the Month for March. He was also named a First Team All-American by D1Baseball, Baseball America, the National Collegiate Baseball Writers of America, Perfect Game, and the American Baseball Coaches Association, and a Second Team All-American by Collegiate Baseball News.

== Professional career ==
=== Draft and minor leagues ===
==== 2019-20 ====
Bishop was considered one of the top prospects for the 2019 Major League Baseball draft. He was selected by the San Francisco Giants with the 10th overall pick in the first round, on account of his plus defense in center field, his excellent speed, his potential to be a power hitter, and his being considered the best college athlete in the draft. Bishop signed with the Giants on June 29, 2019, for $4.1 million.

Bishop made his professional debut with the Arizona League Giants in the rookie-level Arizona League, and, after seven games, Bishop was promoted to the Salem-Keizer Volcanoes in the Low-A Northwest League, where he ended the year. Over 32 games and 105 at bats between the two clubs during which he played center field, he hit .229/.438/.429 with 38 walks, five home runs, 12 RBIs, and eight stolen bases in 10 attempts. He was the Giants' #4 prospect (and the # 65 MLB prospect) according to MLB Pipeline.

Bishop had eight at bats for the Giants in spring training in 2020. On June 29, 2020, it was announced that Bishop had tested positive for COVID-19. He joined players at the team's alternate site in the first week of August.

==== 2021–2025 ====
In early 2021, Bishop was ranked among the top 100 prospects in baseball by Baseball Prospectus (#75) and Major League Baseball (#83). In February 2021, the Giants invited him to the major league camp for spring training. Three games into the 2021 season, he severely injured his right (throwing) shoulder on a swing, and ended up missing almost three months. He returned for less than three weeks, and was shut down for the season after a total of only 45 at bats. After the regular season he was sent to play for the Scottsdale Scorpions in the Arizona Fall League, with whom he batted .262/.373/.381.

Bishop was ranked # 8 in the Giants 2022 MLB Prospect Rankings. In February 2022, Keith Law of The Athletic ranked him # 8 as well, and wrote: "for a guy with his kind of outrageous power and consistently high exit velocities .... It's 30+ homer upside if he gets healthy and can cut down on the swing and miss, both in zone and out."

In 2022, Bishop played for the Eugene Emeralds, in the High-A Northwest League. He batted .235/.320/.406 in a career-high 315 at bats with 51 runs, 13 home runs, 44 RBIs, and 20 stolen bases in 22 attempts, while playing 37 games in center field, 29 games in right field, and 2 games in left field. In April 2023 he underwent Tommy John surgery to repair the UCL in his right elbow, resulting in him missing the entire 2023 season.

In 2024, after 19 months away from the game, he began the season with the Richmond Flying Squirrels of the Eastern League, where he played in Double-A for the first time, playing all three outfield positions in the field. On May 14, Bishop was promoted to the Sacramento River Cats of the Pacific Coast League, where he played in Triple-A for the first time and began by hitting 7-for-16 with an inside-the-park home run.

Bishop made 96 appearances for Sacramento in 2025, slashing .252/.316/.406 with seven home runs, 48 RBI, and 11 stolen bases. He elected free agency following the season on November 6, 2025.

== Personal life ==
Bishop is Jewish. His parents are Randy (who owns a private investigation company) and Suzy Bishop (who ran track at UCLA, and was a movie producer and head of the Vancouver Film School in Canada). His mother Suzy was diagnosed with early-onset Alzheimer's disease at age 54, when he was in high school. Bishop said in 2019: "It made me grow up really, really fast, because the last four or five years I haven't really had a life with a mom. She's still there but it's not who my mom was growing up." His mother died at age 59 in October 2019. He and his brother are creating the "Suzy Bishop Memorial Grant" in their mother's honor, which will be gifted once a year to a family affected by Alzheimer's. His brother, Braden Bishop, is also a professional baseball player, who made his major league debut with the Seattle Mariners before joining the San Francisco Giants organization in 2021.

Bishop is a music producer and has released multiple singles. He has a studio at his home in Chandler, Arizona, where he works.

== See also ==
- List of baseball players who underwent Tommy John surgery
