= Barry Bishop =

Barry Bishop may refer to:

- Barry Bishop (mountaineer) (1932–1994), American mountaineer
- Barry Bishop (politician) (born 1938), Australian politician
