= Ian Bishop =

Ian Bishop may refer to:

- Ian Bishop (cricketer) (born 1967), West Indian Test cricketer
- Ian Bishop (English cricketer) (born 1977), English first-class cricketer
- Ian Bishop (footballer) (born 1965), former football midfielder
- Ian Bishop (bishop) (born 1962), Church of England bishop
- Ian Bishop (rugby union) (born 1943), New Zealand rugby player
