= John Bishop (cricketer) =

English cricketer

John Fillingham Bishop (21 November 1891 – 14 December 1963) was an English first-class cricketer active 1923–25 who played for Nottinghamshire. He was born in Radcliffe-on-Trent; died in Hove.
