= Suzanne Bischoff van Heemskerck =

Dutch politician

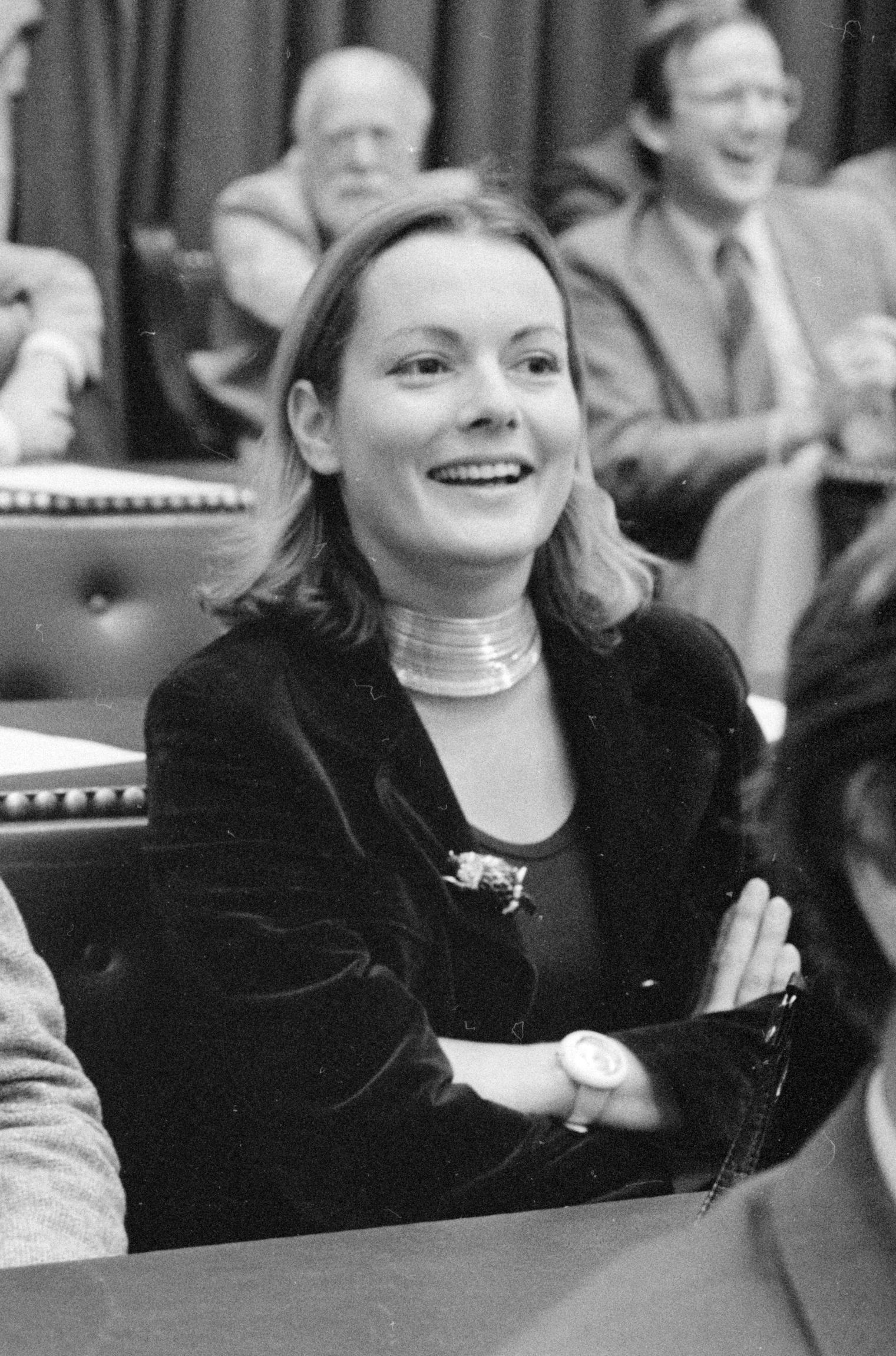
- Suzanne Bischoff van Heemskerck in 1981

Member of the House of Representatives
- In office 1979–1981

Member of the Senate
- In office 1981–1986

Personal details
- Born: 31 July 1950 (age 75) The Hague
- Party: D66

Suzanne Bischoff van Heemskerck (born 31 July 1950, The Hague) is a Dutch former politician who served as a member of the Dutch House of Representatives from 1979 to 1981 and the Senate from 1981 to 1986 for Democrats 66 (D66).
