= Bishopp =

Bishopp is a surname. Notable people with the surname include:

- Bishopp baronets
- Thomas Bishopp (disambiguation)

== See also ==
- Bishop (disambiguation)
