= James Bishop =

James or Jim Bishop may refer to:

- James Bishop (artist) (1927–2021), American painter
- James Bishop (colonial administrator) (1625–1691), early English colonial administrator of Connecticut
- James Bishop (New Jersey politician) (1816–1895), American politician from New Jersey
- James Bishop (diplomat) (born 1938), American diplomat
- James Bishop (rugby union) (1867–1938), Scottish rugby union player
- James Chapman Bishop (1783–1854), British organ manufacturer
- James Cunningham Bishop (1870–1932), American banker
- Jamie Bishop (1971–2007), German language instructor and Virginia Tech shooting victim
- Jamie Bishop (cricketer) (1971–2015), Welsh cricket player
- Jim Bishop (1907–1987), American journalist
- Jim Bishop (baseball) (1898–1973), Major League Baseball pitcher
- Jim Bishop (bishop) (1908–1994), English bishop
- Jim Bishop (doctor), Australian doctor, Chief Medical Officer of Australia 2009–2011
