= Tom Bishop (triathlete) =

British triathlete

Personal information
- Nationality: British
- Born: 9 July 1991 (age 35) Derby, England
Medal record
Men's triathlon
Representing Great Britain
ITU World Triathlon Series
Gold medal – first place	2012 Cremona ITU Sprint Triathlon European Cup	Elite
Silver medal – second place	2017 ITU World Triathlon Abu Dhabi	Elite
Silver medal – second place	2018 ITU World Triathlon Mixed Relay Series Nottingham	Team
Silver medal – second place	2012 Holten ITU Triathlon Premium European Cup	Elite
Silver medal – second place	2010 ITU Triathlon World Championship Grand Final Budapest	Junior
Bronze medal – third place	2012 Barfoot and Thompson World Triathlon Grand Final Auckland	U23
Bronze medal – third place	2011 ITU World Championship Grand Final Beijing	U23
ETU Triathlon European Championships
Gold medal – first place	2016 Lisbon ETU Triathlon European Championships	Team
Gold medal – first place	2008 Holten ETU Triathlon Junior European Cup	Junior
Bronze medal – third place	2015 Geneva ETU Triathlon European Championships	Team
Bronze medal – third place	2012 Aguilas ETU Triathlon U23 and Youth European Championships	Team
Bronze medal – third place	2012 Aguilas ETU Triathlon U23 and Youth European Championships	U23
ETU Duathlon European Championships
Bronze medal – third place	2010 Nancy ETU Duathlon European Championships	Junior

Thomas Bishop (born 9 July 1991) is a British triathlete. He has represented England at the 2018 Commonwealth Games and finished in 7th place in the 2017 ITU World Triathlon Series overall standings. Originally from Derby, Bishop graduated from the University of Leeds and is now based in the city, training at the Leeds Triathlon Centre. He was part of the British mixed relay team that won gold at the 2016 Lisbon ETU European Championships and has achieved a number of podiums on both the international and European triathlon circuits, including silver at the ITU World Triathlon Abu Dhabi 2017.

== Triathlon career ==
Bishop has been racing competitive triathlon for over a decade and has enjoyed a huge amount of success during that time. Bursting onto the scene, Bishop took gold in his first international race at the 2008 Holten ETU Triathlon Junior European Cup when he was just 16. Two years later, Bishop worked his way to a world junior silver medal, taking 3rd place at the 2010 Nancy ETU Duathlon European Championships, 4th place at the 2010 Athlone ETU Triathlon European Championships and 2nd place at the 2010 ITU Triathlon World Championship Grand Final Budapest.

He found himself on the overall podium once more after graduating to U23 racing and Elite Men's races in 2011. He opened the year with a 5th-place finish whilst racing with the Elite Men at the 2011 Banyoles ITU Triathlon Premium European Cup. In September of the same year, Bishop earned the world U23 bronze medal after taking 3rd place at the 2011 ITU World Championship Grand Final Beijing.

The following year saw Bishop on the podium a total of five times, both at the U23 and Elite level. Success began in June for Bishop, winning the Elite Men's race at the 2012 Cremona ITU Sprint Triathlon European Cup and taking silver at the 2012 Holten ITU Triathlon Premium European Cup. He then travelled to Spain in September and took home two bronze medals, one in the U23 race at the 2012 Aguilas ETU Triathlon U23 and Youth European Championships and another in the mixed relay where he raced alongside his brother, David Bishop, as well as Lios Rosindale and Non Stanford. The year was brought to a close with another 3rd-place finish, this time at the 2012 Barfoot and Thompson World Triathlon Grand Final Auckland in which Bishop shared the U23 podium with Spain's Fernando Alarza and Australia's Aaron Royle.

In June, 2013, Bishop won the Leukaemia & Lymphoma Research Blenheim Palace Triathlon, finishing in just over one hour.

Throughout the next few years, Bishop recorded a number of high profile, top ten finishes as he worked his transitioned out of U23 racing and into Elite Men's. Recording 6th-place finishes at the 2014 Mooloolaba ITU Triathlon World Cup and 2014 Madrid ETU Triathlon European Cup Final, Bishop also reached 5th at the 2015 Geneva ETU Triathlon European Championships and secured a bronze medal in the mixed relay at the same event, racing alongside Jodie Stimpson, Lucy Hall and Matthew Sharp for Great Britain.

The following year saw Bishop take home gold at the 2016 Lisbon ETU Triathlon European Championships after the Great Britain mixed relay team, made up of Bishop, Lucy Hall, India Lee and Grant Sheldon beat out Russia by 5 seconds.

Bishop found himself on the podium again in 2017 when he finished in ahead of France's Vincent Luis to take home the silver at the 2017 ITU World Triathlon Abu Dhabi. The same year also saw a number of top-ten finishes from Bishop including a 5th-place finish on home soil at the 2017 ITU World Triathlon Leeds. Bishop ended 2017 ranked seventh in the world, many referring to this year as his breakthrough season.

In 2018, Bishop again found success in England, racing as part of another successful mixed relay team. This time being joined by Non Stanford, Vicky Holland and Jonathan Brownlee, Great Britain raced to a 2nd-place finish at the 2018 ITU World Triathlon Mixed Relay Series Nottingham. This was part of a busy year for Bishop, as he travelled to the 2018 Gold Coast Commonwealth Games in April, finishing 19th.

Bishops strongest performances in 2019 came at the 2019 Daman World Triathlon Abu Dhabi in which he placed 9th in the Elite Men's race and 7th in the mixed relay.

Throughout his career, Bishop has been regarded as one of the most aerodynamic cyclists in professional triathlon. His CdA is similar to a girl.

== Personal life ==
Bishop began triathlon as a twelve-year-old after he and his brother grew up surrounded by sport. Bishop often played football and cricket at school and even took part in archery and karate before taking up cross country running with his brother.

Speaking about the influence of his parents on his sporting success, Bishop said: "We did sport all the time as kids but our parents were never pushy, they just wanted us to have fun. I think that’s the best for development because you actually learn to love your sport rather than it be forced upon you".

== Triathlon competitions ==
The following list is based upon the official ITU rankings and the ITU's Athlete Profiles. Unless indicated otherwise, the following events are triathlons in the Elite Men's category.

Date	Competition	Rank
14th Mar 2020	2020 Mooloolaba ITU Triathlon World Cup	14th
16th Aug 2019	2019 Tokyo ITU World Triathlon Olympic Qualification Event	15th
6th Jul 2019	2019 Hamburg Wasser World Triathlon	38th
29th Jun 2019	2019 Groupe Copley World Triathlon Montreal	29th
9th Jun 2019	2019 AJ Bell World Triathlon Leeds	13th
18 May 2019	2019 ITU World Triathlon Yokohama	20th
9th Mar 2019	2019 Daman World Triathlon Mixed Relay Series Abu Dhabi	7th
8th Mar 2019	2019 Daman World Triathlon Abu Dhabi	9th
16th Sep 2018	2018 ITU World Triathlon Grand Final Gold Coast	23rd
26th Aug 2018	2018 ITU World Triathlon Montreal	24th
27th Jul 2018	2018 ITU World Triathlon Edmonton	DNF
15th Jul 2018	2018 Hamburg ITU Triathlon Mixed Relay World Championships	4th
14th Jul 2018	2018 ITU World Triathlon Hamburg	17th
10th Jun 2018	2018 ITU World Triathlon Leeds	6th
6th Jun 2018	2018 ITU World Triathlon Mixed Relay Series Nottingham	2nd
12 May 2018	2018 ITU World Triathlon Yokohama	24th
5th Apr 2018	2018 Gold Coast Commonwealth Games	19th
2nd Mar 2018	2018 ITU World Triathlon Abu Dhabi	14th
16th Sep 2017	2017 ITU World Triathlon Grand Final Rotterdam	10th
26th Aug 2017	2017 ITU World Triathlon Stockholm	6th
16th Jul 2017	2017 Hamburg ITU Triathlon Mixed Relay World Championships	4th
15th Jul 2017	2017 ITU World Triathlon Hamburg	12th
11th Jun 2017	2017 ITU World Triathlon Leeds	5th
13 May 2017	2017 ITU World Triathlon Yokohama	12th
4th Mar 2017	2017 ITU World Triathlon Abu Dhabi	2nd
18th Sep 2016	2016 ITU World Triathlon Grand Final Cozumel	33rd
4th Sep 2016	2016 ITU World Triathlon Edmonton	5th
17th Jul 2016	2016 Hamburg ITU Triathlon Mixed Relay World Championships	7th
16th Jul 2016	2016 ITU World Triathlon Hamburg	49th
12th Jun 2016	2016 ITU World Triathlon Leeds	20th
29 May 2016	2016 Lisbon ETU Triathlon European Championships (Mixed Relay)	1st
28 May 2016	2016 Lisbon ETU Triathlon European Championships	19th
14 May 2016	2016 ITU World Triathlon Yokohama	49th
9th Apr 2016	2016 ITU World Triathlon Gold Coast	42nd
5th Mar 2016	2016 ITU World Triathlon Abu Dhabi	32nd
6th Sep 2015	2015 ITU World Triathlon Edmonton	11th
2nd Aug 2015	2015 Rio de Janeiro ITU World Olympic Qualification Event	33rd
12th Jul 2015	2015 Geneva ETU Triathlon European Championships (Mixed Relay)	3rd
11th Jul 2015	2015 Geneva ETU Triathlon European Championships	5th
14th Jun 2015	2015 Baku European Games	16th
31 May 2015	2015 ITU World Triathlon London	49th
16 May 2015	2015 ITU World Triathlon Yokohama	DNF
3 May 2015	2015 Antalya ETU Triathlon European Cup	12th
29th Mar 2015	2015 ITU World Triathlon Auckland	13th
14th Mar 2015	2015 Mooloolaba ITU Triathlon World Cup	19th
12th Oct 2014	2014 Cartagena ITU Triathlon World Cup	16th
5th Oct 2014	2014 Cozumel ITU Triathlon World Cup	30th
28th Sep 2014	2014 Alanya ITU Triathlon World Cup	12th
21st Sep 2014	2014 Madrid ETU Triathlon European Cup Final	6th
23rd Aug 2014	2014 ITU World Triathlon Stockholm	13th
6th Apr 2014	2014 ITU World Triathlon Auckland	28th
23rd Mar 2014	2014 New Plymouth ITU Triathlon World Cup	27th
15th Mar 2014	2014 Mooloolaba ITU Triathlon World Cup	6th
12th Sep 2013	2013 ITU World Triathlon Grand Final London (U23)	31st
29th Jun 2013	2013 Holten ETU Triathlon U23 and Youth European Championships	22nd
20th Oct 2012	2012 Barfoot and Thompson World Triathlon Grand Final Auckland (U23)	3rd
2nd Sep 2012	2012 Aguilas ETU Triathlon U23 and Youth European Championships (Mixed Relay)	3rd
1st Sep 2012	2012 Aguilas ETU Triathlon U23 and Youth European Championships (U23)	3rd
7th Jul 2012	2012 Holten ITU Triathlon Premium European Cup	2nd
10th Jun 2012	2012 Cremona ITU Sprint Triathlon European Cup	1st
10th Sep 2011	2011 ITU World Championship Grand Final Beijing (U23)	3rd
20th Aug 2011	2011 Lausanne ITU Elite Sprint Triathlon World Championships	23rd
31st Jul 2011	2011 Banyoles ITU Triathlon Premium European Cup	5th
12th Sep 2010	2010 ITU Triathlon World Championship Grand Final Budapest (Junior)	2nd
4th Jul 2010	2010 Athlone ETU Triathlon European Championships (Junior)	4th
1 May 2010	2010 Nancy ETU Duathlon European Championships (Junior)	3rd
5th Jul 2009	2009 Holten ETU Triathlon European Championships (Junior)	5th
23 May 2009	2009 Budapest ETU Duathlon European Championships (Junior)	21st
16th Jan 2009	2009 Australian Youth Olympic Festival	16th
27th Sep 2008	2008 Rimini ITU Duathlon World Championships (Junior)	24th
28th Jun 2008	2008 Holten ETU Triathlon Junior European Cup (Junior)	1st
24 May 2008	2008 Serres ETU Duathlon European Championships (Junior)	7th
