= Harry Bishop (politician) =

Mayor of Juneau, Alaska

Harry A. Bishop (c. 1869 – May 12, 1920) was an American politician who served as the mayor of Juneau, Alaska from 1912 to 1913.

Political offices
Preceded by Emery Valentine	Mayor of Juneau, Alaska; 1912–1913	Succeeded by Charles Carter
