= John W. Bischoff =

American classical composer

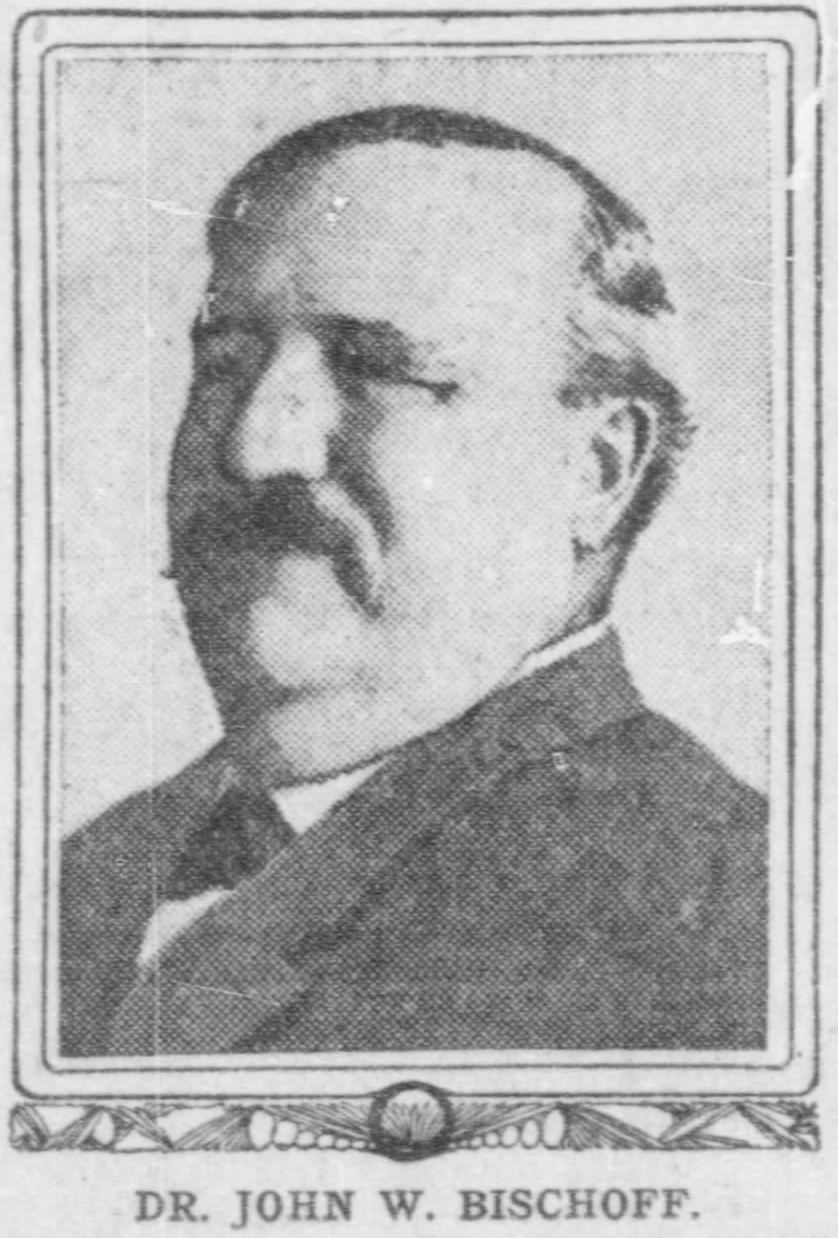
John W. Bischoff

John W. Bischoff (November 27, 1850 – May 30, 1909) was a blind musician and composer.

Blind from age two, Bischoff went on to become a noted organist, compiler of musical collections, and composer. He was the principal organist and choir director at the first Congregational Church in Washington from 1874 until his death in 1909.

Bischoff lost his sight at about two years of age, and attended the Wisconsin School for the Blind. Later he studied singing with Ludden and Bassini in Chicago and studied organ under Creswald. In 1875 he moved to Washington and became the principal organist and choir director at First Congregational Church, posts he held until his death. He was also a music teacher. One of his pupils was soprano and conductor Virginia Powell Goodwin.

He was a great composer and compiler of music, and was considered one of the greatest composers and greatest organists of the country. He was a founding member of the American Guild of Organists. His compilations included a significant number of his own works, including Crystal Songs (1877, with the help of Dr. Otis Presbrey), Gospel Bells (1883, with Jeremiah Rankin), God Be With You (1880), and Not Half Has Been Told (1877). Some of his works were published by Arthur P. Schmidt. Much of his composing was done during the summer when he would visit his cottage on Wisconsin's Lake Winnebago.

Bischoff married Mary Jane Vandergrift, daughter of Howard Vandergrift, in Mount Carroll, Illinois in about 1870. They had met in Fond du Lac, Wisconsin, where Bischoff lived at the time. They had two children, a son John E. and a daughter Lucile. He divorced in 1895, and remarried to Elsie Bond Bischoff.

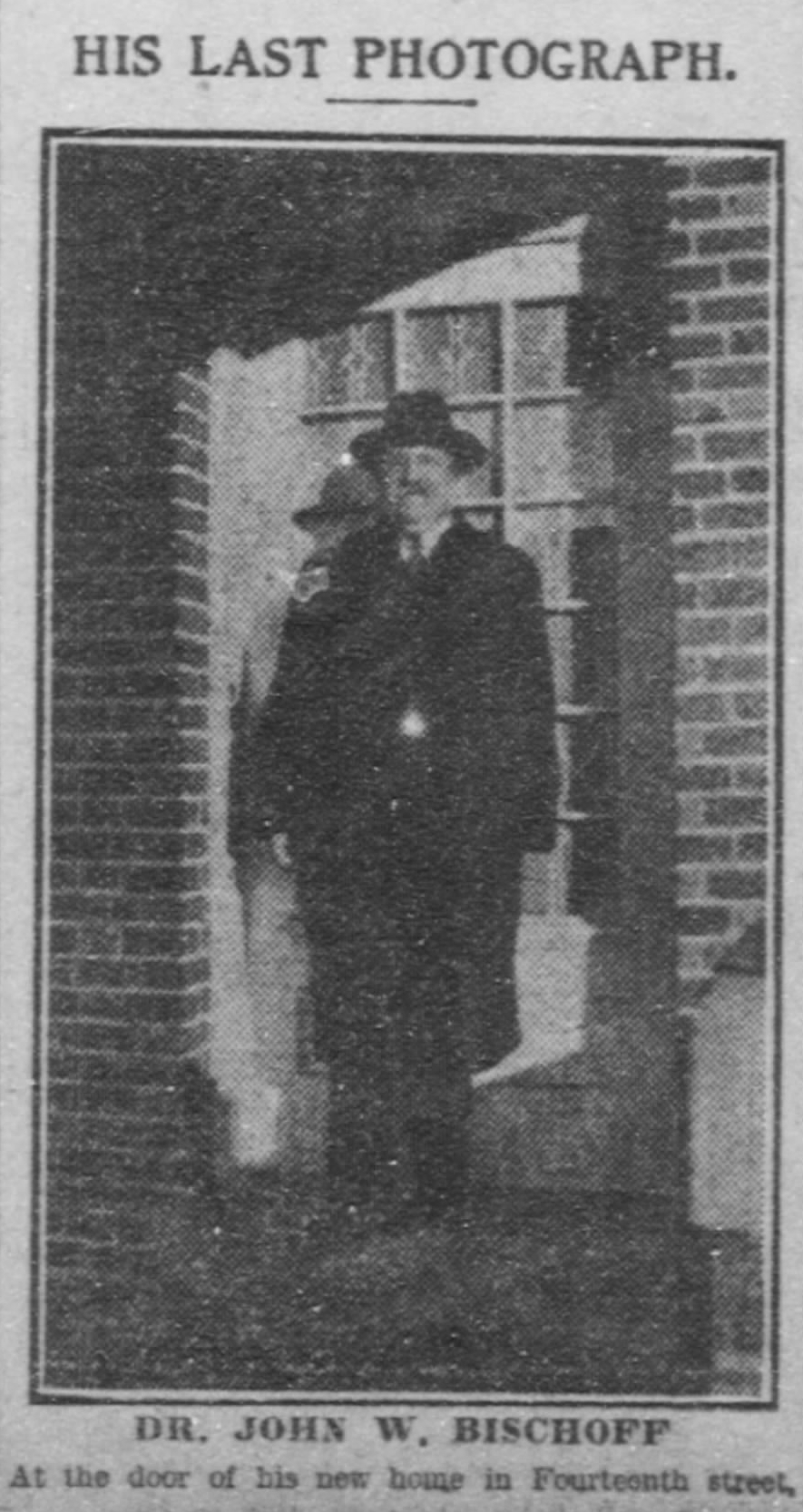
Last photograph of Bischoff before his death in 1909.

Bischoff died the morning of May 30, 1909, of heart disease after three weeks of illness. He was interred in Rock Creek Cemetery.

== Selected compositions ==
- Goodnight, Sweet Dreams
- Unanswered
- Bob o'Link
- If God so clothe the grass
- Five Little White Heads
- I heard the voice of Jesus say
- The Summer Wind
- Forever and a day
- Rose of Virginia
