= Henry Bishop (cricketer) =

English-born Australian cricketer

Personal information
- Full name: Henry Symons Bishop
- Born: 15 December 1849; Torrington, Devon, England
- Died: 18 July 1891 (aged 41); Prahran, Victoria, Australia

Domestic team information
- Years: Team
- 1873: Victoria
- Only First-class: 14 March 1873 Victoria v Tasmania

Career statistics
Competition	First-class
Matches	1
Runs scored	8
Batting average	8.00
100s/50s	0/0
Top score	8
Balls bowled	–
Wickets	–
Bowling average	–
5 wickets in innings	–
10 wickets in match	–
Best bowling	–
Catches/stumpings	1/–
- Source: , 25 August 2011

Henry Symons Bishop (15 December 1849 – 18 July 1891) was a cricketer who played one first class match for Victoria.
