= John Bischoff (baseball) =

American baseball player (1894–1981)

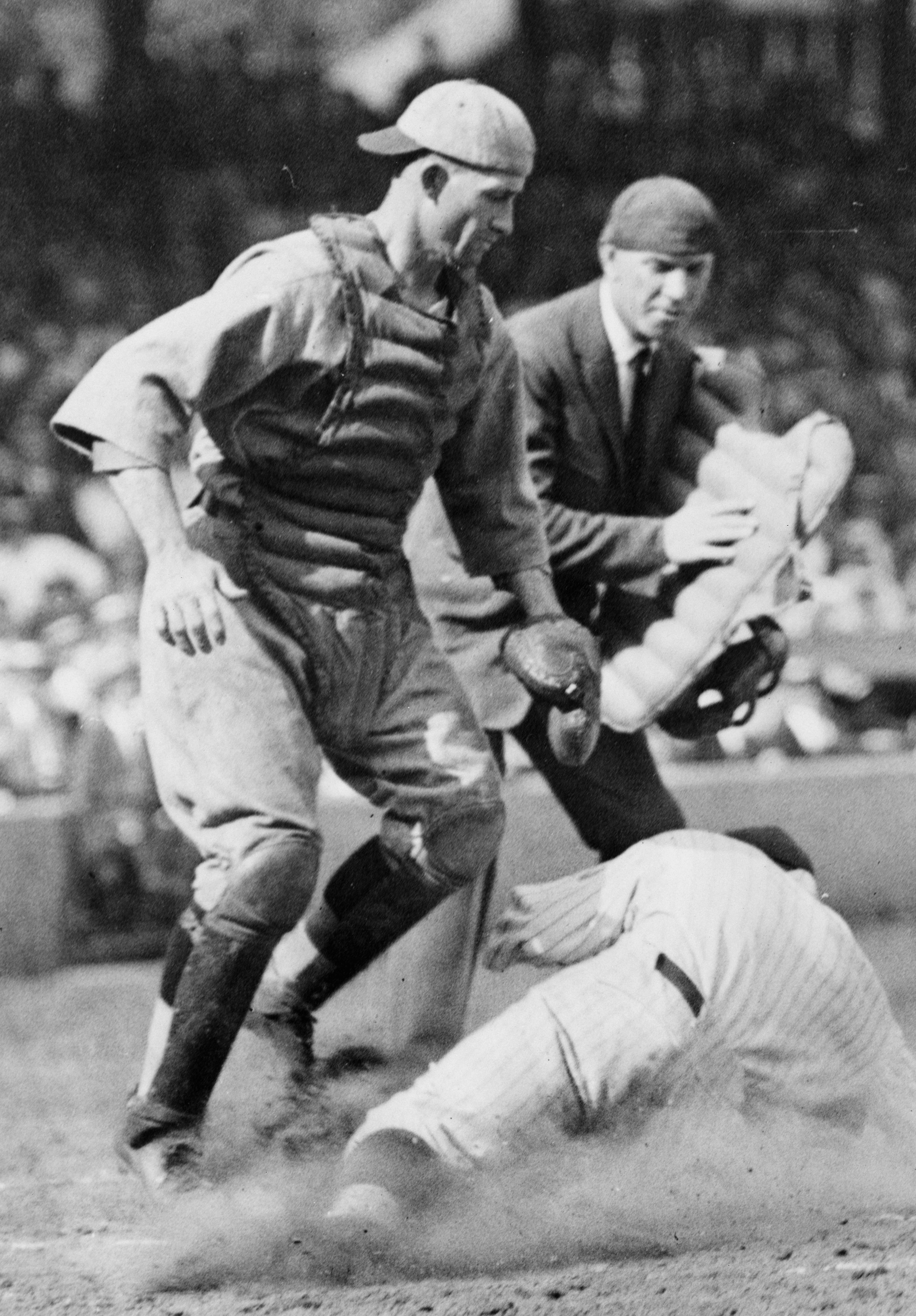
- Bischoff (left) in 1925
- Catcher
- Born: October 28, 1894; Edwardsville, Illinois, U.S.
- Died: December 28, 1981 (aged 87); Granite City, Illinois, U.S.
- Batted: Right Threw: Right

MLB debut
- April 18, 1925, for the Chicago White Sox

Last MLB appearance
- September 22, 1926, for the Boston Red Sox

MLB statistics
- Batting average: .262
- Home runs: 1
- Runs batted in: 35
- Stats at Baseball Reference

Teams
- Chicago White Sox (1925); Boston Red Sox (1925–1926)

John George Bischoff (October 28, 1894 – December 28, 1981) was an American backup catcher who played in Major League Baseball from 1925 to 1926. Listed at 5' 7", 165 lb., Bischoff batted and threw right-handed. He was affectionately nicknamed "Smiley".

A native of Granite City, Illinois, Bischoff was one of the first foreign ballplayers to play in Cuban baseball as a member of the Habana BBC in 1923. He reached the majors in 1925 with the Chicago White Sox, appearing in seven games with them before moving to the Boston Red Sox during the midseason. In part of two major league seasons, he was a .262 hitter (71-for-271) with one home run and 35 RBI in 107 games, including 20 runs, 20 doubles, three triples, and two stolen bases.

Bischoff died in his home town of Granite City at the age of 87.
