= Henry Alfred Bishop =

American politician

Henry Alfred Bishop (December 4, 1860, Bridgeport, Connecticut – 1934) was superintendent and vice-president of several Eastern railroads, as well as other corporations. He served in the Connecticut House of Representatives in 1886.

== Life and career ==
Bishop was born to William D. and Julia Ann Bishop (née Tomlinson) in Bridgeport, Connecticut. Although he attended Yale University along with the class of 1884, he never graduated and instead went to work as a general ticket agent for the Naugatuck Railroad.

He married Jessie Alvord Trubee in Bridgeport on 1883-02-06. He was promoted at the Naugatuck railroad, serving as assistant superintendent from 1885 to 1886. From 1887 to 1902 he was superintendent of the Housatonic Railroad (later, general superintendent of that railroad as well as its branches), becoming purchasing agent for the New York, New Haven and Hartford Railroad. In 1902, he became vice-president of the West Virginia Central and Western Maryland Railroads; he resigned this post in 1903.

In 1915, he was the vice-president or director of several companies, including Pacific Iron Works, Western Union, American District Telegraph Company of New Jersey and Connecticut National Bank.

His grandfather Alfred Bishop et al. founded and built the railroad from New York to New Haven and to Hartford - New York, New Haven and Hartford Railroad. His father William Bishop was president of this railroad.

Note-In 1847, Alfred Bishop, G. L. Schuyler and S. G. Miller entered in a contract to build the New York Bridgeport, RR following route laid out by Prof Twining which ended up costing $2,701,879.13. Fares were low: $1.50 from New Haven to New York, and fifty cents from Bridgeport on account of the steamboat competition.

== Political career ==
Bishop was the Democratic candidate for Connecticut Secretary of State in 1888, after having served in the House of Representatives in 1886; he did serve as the president of the Board of Police Commissioners from 1888 to 1890. He also ran for lieutenant governor in 1904.

== Organizations ==
Bishop was a member of the Episcopal Church, as well as holding membership or leadership positions in several fraternal or service organizations, such as the Sons of the American Revolution, the Society of Colonial Wars, the Bridgeport Scientific and Historical Society, the Freemasons (32°) and the Knights Templar.

He was a trustee of the Bridgeport Orphan Asylum as well as director of Bridgeport Hospital.
