= List of elections in 1906 =

The following elections occurred in the year 1906.

== Asia ==
- 1906 Hong Kong sanitary board election
- 1906 Persian legislative election
- 1906 Russian legislative election

== Europe ==
- 1906 Belgian general election
- 1906 Croatian parliamentary election
- Denmark
  - 1906 Danish Folketing election
  - 1906 Danish Landsting election
  - 1906 Danish local elections
- 1906 Faroese general election
- 1906 Greek legislative election
- 1906 Hungarian parliamentary election
- 1906 Liechtenstein general election
- 1906 Liechtenstein local elections
- 1906 Montenegrin parliamentary election
- 1906 Norwegian parliamentary election
- Portugal
  - April 1906 Portuguese legislative election
  - August 1906 Portuguese legislative election
- 1906 Russian legislative election
- 1906 San Marino Constitutional Assembly election
- 1906 San Marino general election
- 1906 Serbian parliamentary election

=== United Kingdom ===
- 1906 United Kingdom general election
  - 1906 United Kingdom general election in Ireland
  - 1906 United Kingdom general election in Scotland

- List of MPs elected in the 1906 United Kingdom general election

- 1906 Abercromby by-election
- 1906 Aberdeen South by-election
- 1906 Arfon by-election
- 1906 Bodmin by-election
- February 1906 City of London by-election
- 1906 Combined Scottish Universities by-election
- 1906 Cumberland Northern by-election
- 1906 Ealing by-election
- 1906 East Carmarthenshire by-election
- 1906 East Denbighshire by-election
- 1906 East Glamorganshire by-election
- 1906 East Tyrone by-election
- 1906 Eye by-election
- 1906 Galway Borough by-election
- 1906 Hampstead by-election
- 1906 Leicester by-election
- 1906 Mid Glamorgan by-election
- 1906 North Cork by-election
- 1906 North Galwyan by-election
- 1906 North Kilkenny by-election
- 1906 St George's, Hanover Square by-election

== North America ==
=== Canada ===
- 1906 Edmonton municipal election
- 1906 Nova Scotia general election

=== United States ===
- 1906 New York state election
- 1906 United States elections

==== United States lieutenant gubernatorial ====
- 1906 California lieutenant gubernatorial election
- 1906 Connecticut lieutenant gubernatorial election
- 1906 Minnesota lieutenant gubernatorial election
- 1906 Nebraska lieutenant gubernatorial election
- 1906 Texas lieutenant gubernatorial election
- 1906 Wisconsin lieutenant gubernatorial election

==== United States gubernatorial ====
- 1906 Alabama gubernatorial election
- 1906 Arkansas gubernatorial election
- 1906 California gubernatorial election
- 1906 Colorado gubernatorial election
- 1906 Connecticut gubernatorial election
- 1906 Georgia gubernatorial election
- 1906 Idaho gubernatorial election
- 1906 Iowa gubernatorial election
- 1906 Kansas gubernatorial election
- 1906 Maine gubernatorial election
- 1906 Massachusetts gubernatorial election
- 1906 Michigan gubernatorial election
- 1906 Nebraska gubernatorial election
- 1906 Nevada gubernatorial election
- 1906 New Hampshire gubernatorial election
- 1906 New York gubernatorial election
- 1906 North Dakota gubernatorial election
- 1906 Oregon gubernatorial election
- 1906 Pennsylvania gubernatorial election
- 1906 Rhode Island gubernatorial election
- 1906 South Carolina gubernatorial election
- 1906 South Dakota gubernatorial election
- 1906 Tennessee gubernatorial election
- 1906 Texas gubernatorial election
- 1906 United States gubernatorial elections
- 1906 Vermont gubernatorial election
- 1906 Wisconsin gubernatorial election
- 1906 Wyoming gubernatorial election

==== United States House of Representatives ====
- 1906 United States House of Representatives elections
- United States House of Representatives elections in California, 1906
- United States House of Representatives elections in South Carolina, 1906

==== United States Senate ====
- 1906–07 United States Senate elections
- 1906 United States Senate election in Kentucky

==== United States mayoral elections ====
- 1906 Los Angeles mayoral election
- 1906 Milwaukee mayoral election
- 1906 Manchester, New Hampshire mayoral election

== South America ==
- 1906 Brazilian presidential election
- 1906 Chilean parliamentary election
- 1906 Chilean presidential election

== Oceania ==
=== Australia ===
- 1906 Australian Senate election
- 1906 Australian federal election
- 1906 Australian referendum
- 1906 South Australian state election
- 1906 The Castlereagh state by-election
- 1906 Coolgardie state by-election
- 1906 Cootamundra state by-election
- 1906 Queanbeyan state by-election
- 1906 Surry Hills state by-election
- 1906 Toorak state by-election
- 1906 Tasmanian state election

=== New Zealand ===
- 1906 Manukau by-election
- 1906 Westland by-election

== See also ==
- Category:1906 elections
