= 1906 United States gubernatorial elections =

- November 6, 1906 (Note: Arkansas, Georgia, Maine, Oregon, and Vermont held early elections.)

28 governorships
	Majority party	Minority party
Party	Republican	Democratic
Seats before	27 (Note: Andrew L. Harris (R) succeeded Ohio Governor John M. Pattison (D) who died in office in June 1906.)	17
Seats after	25	19
Seat change	▼2	▲2
Seats up	19	8
Seats won	17	10
	Third party
Party	Silver
Seats before	1
Seats after	1
Seat change	Steady
Seats up	1
Seats won	1
- Democratic gain Democratic hold Republican gain Republican hold Silver hold

United States gubernatorial elections were held in 1906, in 28 states, concurrent with the House and Senate elections, on November 6, 1906 (except in Arkansas, Georgia, Maine, Oregon and Vermont, which held early elections).

In Iowa, the gubernatorial election was held in an even-numbered year for the first time, having previously been held in odd-numbered years. The previous election in this state took place in 1903.

In Oregon, the gubernatorial election was held in June for the last time, moving to the same day as federal elections from the 1910 elections.

== Results ==
State	Incumbent	Party	Status	Opposing candidates
Alabama	William D. Jelks	Democratic	Term-limited, Democratic victory	Braxton Bragg Comer (Democratic) 85.48% Asa E. Stratton (Republican) 13.94% J. N. Abbott (Socialist) 0.58%
Arkansas (held, 3 September 1906)	Jeff Davis	Democratic	Retired to run for U.S. Senate, Democratic victory	John S. Little (Democratic) 69.12% John I. Worthington (Republican) 27.29% John G. Adams (Prohibition) 2.16% Dan Hogan (Socialist) 1.43%
California	George Pardee	Republican	Lost Republican nomination, Republican victory	James Norris Gillett (Republican) 40.35% Theodore Arlington Bell (Democratic) 37.71% William H. Langdon (Independence League) 14.43% Austin Lewis (Socialist) 5.14% James H. Blanchard (Prohibition) 2.36% Scattering 0.01%
Colorado	Jesse Fuller McDonald	Republican	Retired, Republican victory	Henry A. Buchtel (Republican) 45.59% Alva Adams (Democratic) 36.63% Ben B. Lindsey (Independent) 8.87% William D. Haywood (Socialist) 7.88% Frank C. Chamberlain (Prohibition) 1.03%
Connecticut	Henry Roberts	Republican	Retired, Republican victory	Rollin S. Woodruff (Republican) 54.83% Charles Frederick Thayer (Democratic) 42.05% Ernest D. Hull (Socialist) 1.82% Matthew E. O'Brien (Prohibition) 1.13% Charles F. Roberts (Socialist Labor) 0.17%
Georgia (held, 3 October 1906)	Joseph M. Terrell	Democratic	Term-limited, Democratic victory	M. Hoke Smith (Democratic) 99.84% J. B. Osburn (Socialist) 0.16% (Democratic primary results) √ M. Hoke Smith def. Clark Howell; John H. Estill; Richard B. Russell; James M. Smith; G. A. Nunnally [data missing]
Idaho	Frank R. Gooding	Republican	Re-elected, 52.18%	Charles O. Stockslager (Democratic) 40.09% Thomas F. Kelley (Socialist) 6.32% Scattering 1.41%
Iowa	Albert B. Cummins	Republican	Re-elected, 50.18%	Claude R. Porter (Democratic) 45.36% Lorenzo S. Coggin (Prohibition) 2.28% John E. Shank (Socialist) 2.02% J. R. Norman (People's) 0.08% Andrew Townsend Hisey (Secular Government) 0.08%
Kansas	Edward W. Hoch	Republican	Re-elected, 48.24%	William A. Harris Jr. (Democratic) 47.57% J. B. Cook (Prohibition) 2.42% Harry Gilham (Socialist) 1.41% Horace A. Keefer (Populist) 0.36%
Maine (held, 10 September 1906)	William T. Cobb	Republican	Re-elected, 52.00%	Cyrus W. Davis (Democratic) 45.96% Charles L. Fox (Socialist) 1.16% Henry Woodward (Prohibition) 0.85% Scattering 0.03%
Massachusetts	Curtis Guild Jr.	Republican	Re-elected, 51.96%	John B. Moran (Democratic/Independence League/Prohibition) 44.90% James F. Carey (Socialist) 1.85% Gamaliel Bradford (Reform) 0.77% William H. Carroll (Socialist Labor) 0.51% Scattering 0.01%
Michigan	Fred M. Warner	Republican	Re-elected, 60.88%	Charles H. Kimmerle (Democratic) 34.78% R. Clark Reed (Prohibition) 2.45% James E. Walker (Socialist) 1.59% Herman Richter (Socialist Labor) 0.31%
Minnesota	John Albert Johnson	Democratic	Re-elected, 60.93%	Albert L. Cole (Republican) 34.78% Charles W. Dorsett (Prohibition) 2.61% O. E. Lofthus (Public Ownership) 1.68%
Nebraska	John H. Mickey	Republican	[data missing]	George L. Sheldon (Republican) 51.27% Ashton C. Shallenberger (Democratic) (Note: Shallenberger ran under a fusion ticket between the Democrats and the Populist Party) 44.48% Harry T. Sutton (Prohibition) 2.68% Elisha Taylor (Socialist) 1.57%
Nevada	John Sparks	Silver-Democrat	Re-elected, 58.54%	Jason F. Mitchell (Republican) 35.96% Thomas B. Casey (Socialist) 5.49%
New Hampshire	John McLane	Republican	[data missing]	Charles M. Floyd (Republican) 49.79% Nathan C. Jameson (Democratic) 46.22% Edmund B. Tetley (Prohibition) 2.71% W. H. McFall (Socialist) 1.24% Winston Churchill (Independent) 0.04% Scattering 0.01%
New York	Frank W. Higgins	Republican	Retired, Republican victory	Charles Evans Hughes (Republican) 50.52% William Randolph Hearst (Democratic/Independence League) 46.62% John C. Chase (Socialist) 1.47% Henry M. Randall (Prohibition) 1.08% Thomas H. Jackson (Socialist Labor) 0.31%
North Dakota	Elmore Y. Sarles	Republican	Defeated, 44.22%	John Burke (Democratic) 51.94% L. F. Dow (Socialist) 1.48% Scattering 2.37%
Oregon (held, 4 June 1906)	George Earle Chamberlain	Democratic	Re-elected, 47.56%	James Withycombe (Republican) 44.99% C. W. Barzee (Socialist) 4.62% I. H. Amos (Prohibition) 2.83%
Pennsylvania	Samuel W. Pennypacker	Republican	Term-limited, Republican victory	Edwin Sydney Stuart (Republican) 50.31% Lewis Emery Jr. (Democratic/Lincoln Party) 45.51% Homer L. Castle (Prohibition) 2.46% James Hudson Maurer (Socialist) 1.51% John Desmond (Socialist Labor) 0.21%
Rhode Island	George H. Utter	Republican	Defeated, 47.94%	James H. Higgins (Democratic) 49.92% Bernan E. Helme (Prohibition) 1.07% Warren A. Carpenter (Socialist) 0.59% David J. Moran (Socialist Labor) 0.48%
South Carolina	Duncan Clinch Heyward	Democratic	Term-limited, Democratic victory	Martin Frederick Ansel (Democratic) 99.89% F. N. U. Chandler (Socialist) 0.11% (Democratic primary run-off results); Martin Frederick Ansel 56.12% Richard Irvine Manning III 43.88%
South Dakota	Samuel H. Elrod	Republican	Retired, Republican victory	Coe I. Crawford (Republican) 65.32% John A. Stransky (Democratic) 26.72% Knute Lewis (Prohibition) 4.56% Freeman Knowles (Socialist) 3.41%
Tennessee	John I. Cox	Democratic	Lost Democratic nomination, Democratic victory	Malcolm R. Patterson (Democratic) 54.42% Henry Clay Evans (Republican) 45.14% John M. Ray (Socialist) 0.44%
Texas	S. W. T. Lanham	Democratic	Retired, Democratic victory	Thomas M. Campbell (Democratic) 81.17% C. A. Gray (Republican) 12.94% Alex W. Atcheson (Reorganized Republican) 2.94% George C. Edwards (Socialist) 1.61% J. W. Pearson (Prohibition) 1.21% Arthur S. Dowler (Socialist Labor) 0.14%
Vermont (held, 4 September 1906)	Charles J. Bell	Republican	Retired, Republican victory	Fletcher D. Proctor (Republican) 60.05% Percival Wood Clement (Independent/Democratic) 38.18% Lester W. Hanson (Prohibition) 1.04% Timothy Sullivan (Socialist) 0.73% Scattering 0.01%
Wisconsin	James O. Davidson	Republican	Re-elected, 57.36%	John A. Aylward (Democratic) 32.28% Winfield R. Gaylord (Social Democrat) 7.64% Ephraim Llewellyn Eaton (Prohibition) 2.57% Ole T. Rosaas (Socialist Labor) 0.14% Scattering 0.01%
Wyoming	Bryant B. Brooks	Republican	Re-elected, 60.20%	Stephen A. D. Keister (Democratic) 34.85% William L.O'Neill (Socialist) 4.56% George W. Blain (Independent) 0.39%

== See also ==
- 1906 United States elections
  - 1906–07 United States Senate elections
  - 1906 United States House of Representatives elections
