= 1907 in the United States =

- Decades: 1880s; 1890s; 1900s; 1910s; 1920s
- See also: History of the United States (1865–1918); Timeline of United States history (1900–1929); List of years in the United States

Events from the year 1907 in the United States.

== Incumbents ==
=== Federal government ===
- President: Theodore Roosevelt (R-New York)
- Vice President: Charles W. Fairbanks (R-Indiana)
- Chief Justice: Melville Fuller (Illinois)
- Speaker of the House of Representatives: Joseph Gurney Cannon (R-Illinois)
- Congress: 59th (until March 4), 60th (starting March 4)

==== State governments ====
Governors and lieutenant governors

=== Governors ===
- Governor of Alabama: William D. Jelks (Democratic) (until January 14), B. B. Comer (Democratic) (starting January 14)
- Governor of Arkansas:
  - until January 8: Jeff Davis (Democratic)
  - January 8 – February 15: John Sebastian Little (Democratic)
  - February 15 – May 14: John Isaac Moore (Democratic)
  - starting May 14: Xenophon Overton Pindall (Democratic)
- Governor of California: George Pardee (Republican) (until January 9), James Gillett (Republican) (starting January 9)
- Governor of Colorado: Jesse Fuller McDonald (Republican) (until January 8), Henry Augustus Buchtel (Republican) (starting January 8)
- Governor of Connecticut: Henry Roberts (Republican) (until January 9), Rollin S. Woodruff (Republican) (starting January 9)
- Governor of Delaware: Preston Lea (Republican)
- Governor of Florida: Napoleon B. Broward (Democratic)
- Governor of Georgia: Joseph M. Terrell (Democratic) (until June 29), Hoke Smith (Democratic) (starting June 29)
- Governor of Idaho: Frank R. Gooding (Republican)
- Governor of Illinois: Charles S. Deneen (Republican)
- Governor of Indiana: J. Frank Hanly (Republican)
- Governor of Iowa: Albert B. Cummins (Republican)
- Governor of Kansas: Edward W. Hoch (Republican)
- Governor of Kentucky: J. C. W. Beckham (Democratic) (until December 10), Augustus E. Willson (Republican) (starting December 10)
- Governor of Louisiana: Newton Crain Blanchard (Democratic)
- Governor of Maine: William T. Cobb (Republican)
- Governor of Maryland: Edwin Warfield (Democratic)
- Governor of Massachusetts: Curtis Guild, Jr. (Republican)
- Governor of Michigan: Fred M. Warner (Republican)
- Governor of Minnesota: John A. Johnson (Democratic)
- Governor of Mississippi: James K. Vardaman (Democratic)
- Governor of Missouri: Joseph W. Folk (Democratic)
- Governor of Montana: Joseph Toole (Democratic)
- Governor of Nebraska: John H. Mickey (Republican) (until January 3), George L. Sheldon (Republican) (starting January 3)
- Governor of Nevada: John Sparks (Silver)
- Governor of New Hampshire: John McLane (Republican) (until January 3), Charles M. Floyd (Republican) (starting January 3)
- Governor of New Jersey: Edward C. Stokes (Republican)
- Governor of New York: Charles Evans Hughes (Republican) (starting January 1)
- Governor of North Carolina: Robert Broadnax Glenn (Democratic)
- Governor of North Dakota: Elmore Y. Sarles (Republican) (until January 9), John Burke (Democratic) (starting January 9)
- Governor of Ohio: Andrew L. Harris (Republican)
- Governor of Oklahoma: Frank Frantz (Republican) (until November 16), Charles N. Haskell (Democratic) (starting November 16)
- Governor of Oregon: George Chamberlain (Democratic)
- Governor of Pennsylvania: Samuel W. Pennypacker (Republican) (until January 15), Edwin Sydney Stuart (Republican) (starting January 15)
- Governor of Rhode Island: George H. Utter (Republican) (until January 1), James H. Higgins (Democratic) (starting January 1)
- Governor of South Carolina: Duncan Clinch Heyward (Democratic) (until January 15), Martin Frederick Ansel (Democratic) (starting January 15)
- Governor of South Dakota: Samuel H. Elrod (Republican) (until January 8), Coe I. Crawford (Republican) (starting January 8)
- Governor of Tennessee: John I. Cox (Democratic) (until January 17), Malcolm R. Patterson (Democratic) (starting January 17)
- Governor of Texas: S. W. T. Lanham (Democratic) (until January 15), Thomas Mitchell Campbell (Democratic) (starting January 15)
- Governor of Utah: John Christopher Cutler (Republican)
- Governor of Vermont: Fletcher D. Proctor (Republican)
- Governor of Virginia: Claude A. Swanson (Democratic)
- Governor of Washington: Albert E. Mead (Republican)
- Governor of West Virginia: William M. O. Dawson (Republican)
- Governor of Wisconsin: James O. Davidson (Republican)
- Governor of Wyoming: Bryant B. Brooks (Republican)

=== Lieutenant governors ===
- Lieutenant Governor of Alabama: Russell M. Cunningham (Democratic) (until January 14), Henry B. Gray (Democratic) (starting January 14)
- Lieutenant Governor of California: Alden Anderson (Republican) (until January 8), Warren R. Porter (Republican) (starting January 8)
- Lieutenant Governor of Colorado: Fred W. Parks (Republican) (until January 8), Erastus Harper (Republican) (starting January 8)
- Lieutenant Governor of Connecticut: Rollin S. Woodruff (Republican) (until January 9), Everett J. Lake (Republican) (starting January 9)
- Lieutenant Governor of Delaware: Isaac T. Parker (Republican)
- Lieutenant Governor of Idaho: Burpee L. Steeves (Republican) (until January 7), Ezra A. Burrell (Republican) (starting January 7)
- Lieutenant Governor of Illinois: Lawrence Sherman (Republican)
- Lieutenant Governor of Indiana: Hugh T. Miller (Republican)
- Lieutenant Governor of Iowa: John Herriott (Republican) (until January 13), Warren Garst (Republican) (starting January 13)
- Lieutenant Governor of Kansas: David J. Hanna (Republican) (until month and day unknown), William J. Fitzgerald (Republican) (starting month and day unknown)
- Lieutenant Governor of Kentucky: William P. Thorne (Democratic) (until December 10), William Hopkinson Cox (Republican) (starting December 10)
- Lieutenant Governor of Louisiana: Jared Y. Sanders, Sr. (Democratic)
- Lieutenant Governor of Massachusetts: Eben Sumner Draper (Republican)
- Lieutenant Governor of Michigan: Alexander Maitland (Republican) (until month and day unknown), Patrick H. Kelley (Republican) (starting month and day unknown)
- Lieutenant Governor of Minnesota: Ray W. Jones (Republican) (until January 7), Adolph Olson Eberhart (Republican) (starting January 7)
- Lieutenant Governor of Mississippi: John Prentiss Carter (Democratic)
- Lieutenant Governor of Missouri: John C. McKinley (Republican)
- Lieutenant Governor of Montana: Edwin L. Norris (Democratic)
- Lieutenant Governor of Nebraska: Edmund G. McGilton (Republican) (until January 3), Melville R. Hopewell (Republican) (starting January 3)
- Lieutenant Governor of Nevada: Lemuel Allen (political party unknown) (until May 22), Denver S. Dickerson (Silver) (starting May 22)
- Lieutenant Governor of New York: Lewis Stuyvesant Chanler (Democratic) (starting January 1)
- Lieutenant Governor of North Carolina: Francis D. Winston (Democratic)
- Lieutenant Governor of North Dakota: David Bartlett (Republican) (until January 9), Robert S. Lewis (Republican) (starting January 9)
- Lieutenant Governor of Ohio: vacant
- Lieutenant Governor of Oklahoma: George W. Bellamy (Democratic) (starting month and day unknown)
- Lieutenant Governor of Pennsylvania: William M. Brown (Republican) (until January 15), Robert S. Murphy (Republican) (starting January 15)
- Lieutenant Governor of Rhode Island: Frederick Jackson (Republican)
- Lieutenant Governor of South Carolina: John Sloan (Democratic) (until January 15), Thomas Gordon McLeod (Democratic) (starting January 15)
- Lieutenant Governor of South Dakota: John E. McDougall (Republican) (until January 8), Howard C. Shober (Republican) (starting January 8)
- Lieutenant Governor of Tennessee: Ernest Rice (Democratic) (until month and day unknown), E. G. Tollett (Democratic) (starting month and day unknown)
- Lieutenant Governor of Texas: George D. Neal (Democratic) (until January 15), Asbury Bascom Davidson (Democratic) (starting January 15)
- Lieutenant Governor of Vermont: George H. Prouty (Republican)
- Lieutenant Governor of Virginia: James Taylor Ellyson (Democratic)
- Lieutenant Governor of Washington: Charles E. Coon (Republican)
- Lieutenant Governor of Wisconsin: vacant (until January 7), William D. Connor (Republican) (starting January 7)

== Events ==
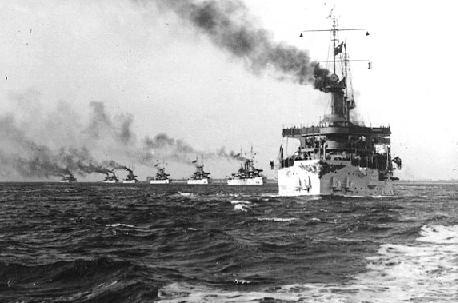
December 16: Great White Fleet

=== January–March ===
- January 1 – Daniel J. Tobin becomes president of the Teamsters, beginning a 45-year presidency.
- January 14 – B. B. Comer is sworn in as the 33rd governor of Alabama replacing William D. Jelks.
- January 23 – Charles Curtis from Kansas becomes the first Native American U.S. Senator.
- February 6 – Nantahala National Forest is established.
- February 12 – The steamship Larchmont collides with the Harry Knowlton off Block Island, Rhode Island; 183 lives are lost.
- February 26 – President Theodore Roosevelt appoints Col. George Washington Goethals as chief engineer of the Panama Canal.
- March 1 – Colville National Forest is established.
- March 2 – Umpqua and Custer National Forest are established.
- March 9 – Reclamation Service within the Department of the Interior.

=== April–June ===
- April – This month's issue of Good Housekeeping magazine displays the cover price One Dollar a Year (under the title).
- April 7 – Hersheypark opens in Hershey, Pennsylvania.
- April 15 – Triangle Fraternity, for engineering and related majors, is founded at Pennsylvania State University.
- April 17 – Today is the all-time busiest day of immigration through Ellis Island; this will be the busiest year ever seen here, with 1.1 million immigrants arriving.
- April 18 – The USS Kansas (BB-21), a Connecticut-class battleship, is commissioned.
- April 26 – Opening of the Jamestown Exposition at Sewell's Point, Virginia by President Theodore Roosevelt, exactly 300 years to the day of the landing of Captain Christopher Newport and the English colonists at Cape Henry. The exposition is held until December 1st, and celebrates the 300th anniversary of the founding of Jamestown.
- May 25 – Inyo National Forest is established.

=== July–September ===
- July 1 – The United States Treasury stops collecting interest on the 1879 $10 Refunding Certificates, which have their value set at $21.30.
- July 21 – The SS Columbia sinks after colliding with the lumber schooner San Pedro off Shelter Cove, California, resulting in 88 deaths.
- July 23 – Chugach National Forest is established.
- August 1 – Aeronautical Division established within the U.S. Army Signal Corps.
- August 15 – Ordination in Constantinople of Fr. Raphael Morgan, first African-American Eastern Orthodox priest, "Priest-Apostolic" to America and the West Indies.
- August 17 – Pike Place Market in Seattle, Washington officially opens for business.
- August 28 – American Messenger Service, predecessor to UPS, is founded by James E. (Jim) Casey in Seattle, Washington.
- September 7 – The new passenger liner RMS Lusitania makes its maiden voyage from Liverpool, England to New York City.
- September 10 – The first Neiman Marcus luxury department store opens in Dallas, Texas.
- September 29 – A foundation stone is laid for the Washington National Cathedral; construction will not be fully completed until 1990.

=== October–December ===
November 16: Oklahoma

- October 1 – Office of the Superintendent of Prisons and Prisoners established within Department of Justice.
- October 22 – Panic of 1907: A bank run forces New York's Knickerbocker Trust Company to suspend operations.
- October 24 – A major American financial crisis is averted when J. P. Morgan, E. H. Harriman, James Stillman, Henry Clay Frick, and other Wall Street financiers create a $25,000,000 pool to invest in the shares on the plunging New York Stock Exchange, ending the bank panic of 1907, a move which ultimately leads to establishment of the Federal Reserve System.
- November 3 – President Roosevelt approves the takeover of the Tennessee Coal, Iron and Railroad Company by J. P. Morgan's U.S. Steel company in the wake of the panic of 1907.
- November 4 – In Detroit, Perry and Ben Feigenson begin transforming their cake frosting flavors into The Feigenson Brothers Bottling Works soft drink recipe, later shortened to Faygo.
- November 7 – Delta Sigma Pi (a co-ed professional business fraternity) is founded at the School of Commerce, Accounts and Finance of New York University in New York City.
- November 16
  - Indian Territory and Oklahoma Territory are combined to become Oklahoma, which is admitted into the Union as the 46th U.S. state (see History of Oklahoma).
  - Passenger liner RMS Mauretania, the world's largest and fastest at this date, sets out on her maiden voyage from Liverpool (England) to New York.
- November 21 – Washington State College defeats the University of Washington 10–5 in the Apple Cup in college football, played in Seattle.
- [November 25 – The Church of God in Christ, which becomes the fifth-largest African-American Pentecostal-Holiness Christian denomination in the United States, is founded by Bishop Charles Harrison Mason in Memphis, Tennessee.
- November 28 – Johnny Hayes wins the inaugural Yonkers Marathon.
- December 6 – Monongah Mining Disaster: A coal mine explosion kills 362 workers in Monongah, West Virginia.
- December 16 – The Great White Fleet departs Hampton Roads, Virginia on a 14-month circumnavigation of the globe.
- December 18 – Ouachita National Forest is established.
- December 19 – An explosion in a coal mine in Jacobs Creek, Pennsylvania kills 239.
- December 31 – The first electric ball drops in Times Square.

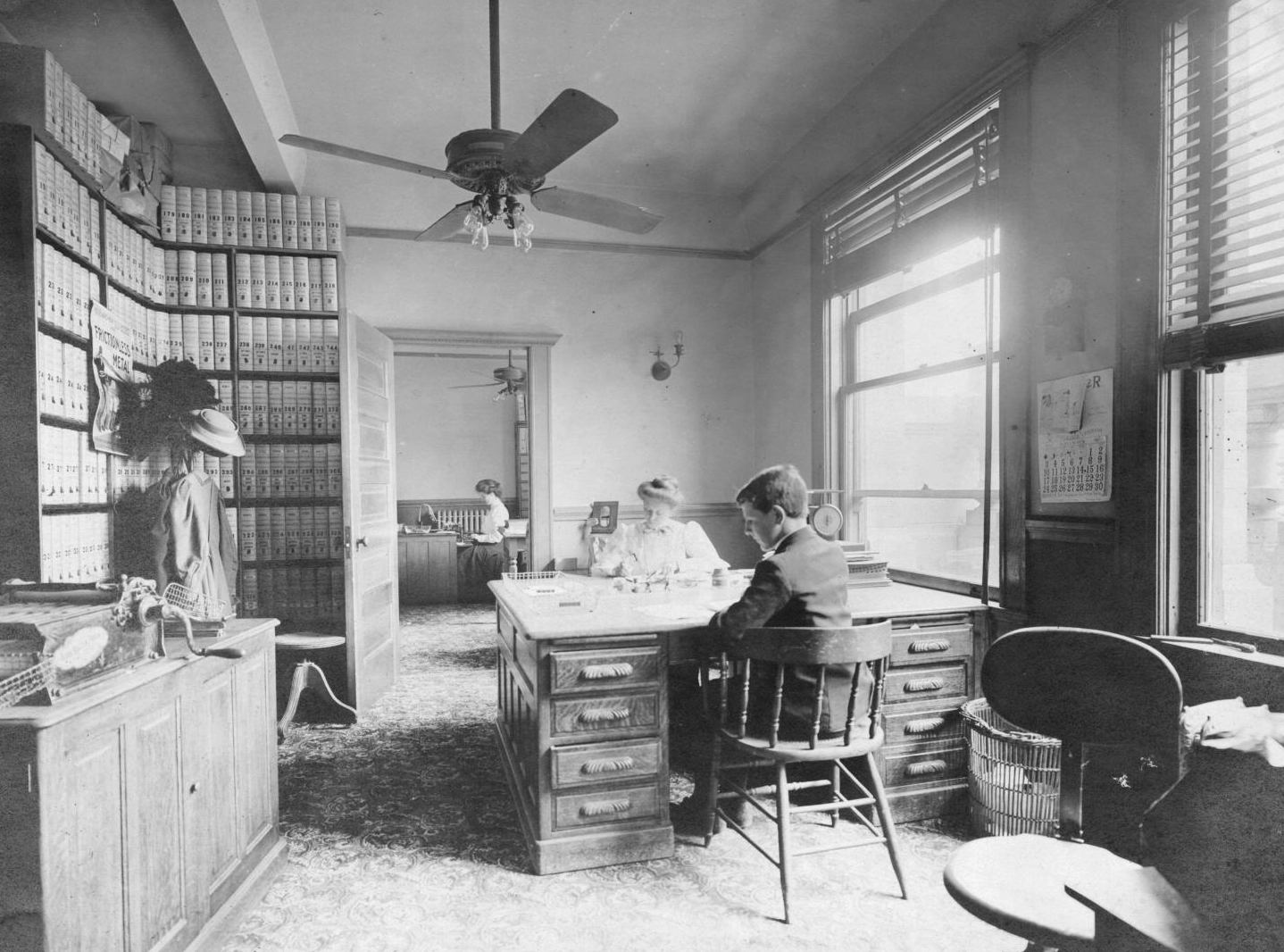
Southern Pine Lumber Company billing clerk's office, Texarkana, Arkansas, 1907.

=== Undated ===
- Indiana becomes the world's first legislature to place laws permitting compulsory sterilization for eugenic purposes on the statute book.
- The Lockport Powerhouse is built in Illinois.
- The National Rural Education Association is founded in Indiana.
- The Osage Nation retains mineral rights in reservation lands.
- A statue of J. E. B. Stuart, Confederate general, is dedicated on Richmond, Virginia's Monument Avenue.

=== Ongoing ===
- Progressive Era (1890s–1920s)
- Lochner era (c. 1897–c. 1937)
- Black Patch Tobacco Wars (1904–1909)
- Great White Fleet voyage (1907–1909)

== Sport ==
- November 23 – Yale Bulldogs win their first IAAUS (later NCAA) College Football National Championship

== Births ==
- January 2 – Gordon L. Allott, U.S. Senator from Colorado from 1955 to 1973 (died 1989)
- January 9
  - Eldred G. Smith, patriarch (d. 2013)
  - Earl W. Renfroe, African American orthodontist, educator, and activist (died 2000)
- January 19 – Paul Fannin, U.S. Senator from Arizona from 1959 to 1965 (died 2002)
- January 29 – Bil Dwyer, cartoonist and humorist (died 1987)
- February 3 – James A. Michener, novelist (died 1997)
- February 12 – Clifton C. Edom, photojournalism educator (died 1991)
- February 15 – Cesar Romero, actor (died 1994)
- February 22
  - Sheldon Leonard, screen actor, writer, director and producer (died 1997)
  - Robert Young, actor (died 1998)
- February 25 – Kathryn Wasserman Davis, philanthropist (died 2013)
- February 26
  - Dub Taylor, screen character actor (died 1994)
  - Rosebud Yellow Robe, Native American folklorist, educator, and author (died 1992)
- February 27 – Mildred Bailey, Native American jazz singer (died 1951)
- February 28 – Milton Caniff, cartoonist (died 1988)
- March 4 – Maria Branyas, American-Spanish supercentenarian, oldest known living person from 17 January 2023 to 19 August 2024 (died 2024)
- March 5 – Thomas McKimson, animator (died 1998)
- March 12 – Dorrit Hoffleit, astronomer (died 2007)
- March 16 – Frances Fuller, actress (died 1980)
- March 27 – Mary Treen, actress (died 1989)
- April 21 – Wade Mainer, singer and banjoist (died 2011)
- May 2 – Pinky Lee, comedian (died 1993)
- May 3 – Dorothy Young, entertainer (died 2011)
- May 4 – Lincoln Kirstein, cultural figure (died 1996)
- May 11 – Kent Taylor, screen actor (died 1987)
- May 12 – Katharine Hepburn, screen actress (died 2003)
- May 15 – Thomas J. Dodd, U.S. Senator from Connecticut from 1959 to 1971 (died 1971)
- May 15 – Josef Alexander, composer (died 1992)
- May 26 – John Wayne, film actor and director (died 1979)
- May 27 – Rachel Carson, environmental writer (died 1964)
- June 6 – Nate Barragar, American football player and actor (died 1985)
- June 7 – Arthur Marshall Davis, judge (died 1963)
- June 22 – Wesley E. Brown, district court judge (died 2012)
- June 28 – Junius Driggs, businessman (died 1994)
- July 3 – Nora Thompson Dean, Indigenous American (Lenape) linguist (died 1984)
- July 4
  - John Anderson, discus thrower (died 1948)
  - Gordon Griffith, actor, director and producer (died 1958)
  - Howard Taubman, author and critic (died 1996)
- July 7 – Robert A. Heinlein, science fiction author (died 1988)
- July 9 – Philip Klutznick, administrator, secretary of commerce (died 1999)
- July 10 – John Michaels, baseball pitcher (died 1996)
- July 27 – Ross Alexander, actor (died 1937)
- August 2 – Mary Hamman, writer and editor (died 1984)
- August 14 – Stanley Adams, lyricist and songwriter (died 1994)
- August 19 – Thruston Ballard Morton, U.S. Senator from Kentucky from 1957 to 1968 (died 1982)
- August 21
  - John G. Trump, electrical engineer, inventor and physicist (died 1985)
  - Hy Zaret, American lyricist and composer (died 2007)
- August 29 – Lurene Tuttle, radio actress (died 1986)
- August 30 – John Mauchly, computer scientist (died 1980)
- August 31 – William Shawn, editor of The New Yorker (died 1992)
- September 1
  - Walter Reuther, union leader, founded United Auto Workers (died 1970)
  - Miriam Seegar, actress (died 2011)
- September 12 – Spud Chandler, baseball player (died 1990)
- September 15 – Jimmy Wallington, radio personality (died 1972)
- September 17 – Warren E. Burger, 15th Chief Justice of the United States (died 1995)
- September 19 – Lewis F. Powell Jr., Associate Justice of the Supreme Court (died 1998)
- October 5 – Mrs. Miller, singer (died 1997)
- October 20 – Arlene Francis, actress (died 2001)
- October 22 – Jimmie Foxx, baseball player, coach, and manager (died 1967)
- October 30 – Sol Tax, anthropologist (died 1995)
- November 6 – Charles W. Yost, diplomat (died 1981)
- November 16 – Burgess Meredith, actor (died 1997)
- November 21 – Ben C. Duniway, judge (died 1986)
- November 30 – Katharine Bartlett, anthropologist and museum curator (died 2001)
- December 1 – Joey Aiuppa, mobster (died 1997)
- December 23 – James Roosevelt, businessman and politician (died 1991)
- December 25
  - Cab Calloway, African American jazz singer and bandleader (died 1994)
  - Glenn McCarthy, oil tycoon (died 1988)
  - Rufus P. Turner, African American electronic engineer (died 1982)
- December 26 – Albert Gore Sr., politician and father of Al Gore (died 1998)

== Deaths ==
- January 2 – Henry R. Pease, U.S. Senator from Mississippi from 1874 to 1875 (born 1835)
- January 24 – Russell A. Alger, U.S. Senator from Michigan from 1902 to 1907 (born 1836)
- February 17 – Henry Steel Olcott, military officer and co-founder of the Theosophical Society (born 1832)
- March 9 – James L. Pugh, U.S. Senator from Alabama from 1880 to 1897 (born 1820)
- April 14 – Frank Manly Thorn, lawyer, politician, government official, essayist, journalist, humorist, inventor and 6th Superintendent of the United States Coast and Geodetic Survey (born 1836)
- April 23 – Alferd Packer, cannibal (born 1842)
- May 1 – Melissa Elizabeth Riddle Banta, poet (born 1834)
- May 4 – John Watts de Peyster, author, philanthropist and soldier (born 1821)
- May 8 – Edmund G. Ross, U.S. Senator from Kansas from 1866 to 1871 (born 1826)
- May 9 – Melissa Elizabeth Banta, poet, travel writer (born 1834)
- May 24 – John Patton, Jr., U.S. Senator from Michigan from 1894 to 1895 (born 1850)
- May 26 – Ida Saxton McKinley, First Lady of the United States (born 1847)
- June 6 – Micah Bell, American cowboy and former member of the Van der Linde gang. (born 1860)
- June 10 – Stephen Bates, sheriff of Vergennes, Vermont (born 1842)
- June 11 – John Tyler Morgan, U.S. Senator from Alabama from 1877 to 1907 (born 1824)
- June 12 – Ellen Russell Emerson, ethnologist (born 1837)
- June 14 – William Le Baron Jenney, architect and civil engineer (born 1832)
- June 21 – Lucien Baker, U.S. Senator from Kansas from 1895 to 1901 (born 1846)
- July 11 – Robert Watt, miner (born 1832)
- July 25 – Peter Anderson, Union Army Medal of Honor recipient (born 1847)
- July 27 – Edmund Pettus, U.S. Senator from Alabama from 1897 to 1907 (born 1821)
- August 1 – Lucy Mabel Hall-Brown, physician and writer (born 1843)
- August 3 – Augustus Saint-Gaudens, Beaux-Arts sculptor (born 1848 in Ireland)
- August 14 – William Birney, Union Army general, abolitionist, attorney and writer (born 1819)
- October 3 – Jacob Nash Victor, railroad builder (born 1835)
- October 8 – Mary Cyrene Burch Breckinridge, Second Lady of the United States (born 1826)
- October 30 – Caroline Dana Howe, author (born 1824)
- November 22 – Asaph Hall, astronomer (born 1829)
- December 7 – Carrie Clark, model, notably of Muriel's Babies cigar box fame
- December 23 – Stephen Mallory II, U.S. Senator from Florida from 1897 to 1907 (born 1848)
- Sarah Gibson Humphreys, author and suffragist (born 1830)

== See also ==
- List of American films of 1907
- Timeline of United States history (1900–1929)
