= Robert Watt =

Robert or Bob Watt may refer to:

- Robert Watt (bibliographer) (1774–1819), Scottish physician and bibliographer
- Robert Watt (miner) (1832–1907), Scottish–American miner
- Robert Watt (officer of arms) (born 1945), Canadian museum curator and officer of arms
- Robert Watt (Irish civil servant), secretary general of the Department of Health (Ireland)
- Robert Lee Watt (born 1948), first African American French hornist hired by a major symphony orchestra in the United States
- Bob Watt (ice hockey) (1927–2010), Canadian ice hockey player
- Bob Watt (footballer) (1933–1984), Australian rules footballer

== See also ==
- Robert Watts (disambiguation)
- Robert Watson-Watt (1892–1973), Scottish pioneer of radio direction finding and radar technology
