= Governor Floyd =

Governor Floyd may refer to:

- Charles M. Floyd (1861–1923), 51st Governor of New Hampshire
- John Floyd (Virginia politician) (1783–1837), 25th Governor of Virginia
- John B. Floyd (1806–1863), 31st Governor of Virginia
