= 1902 South Carolina gubernatorial election =

1902 South Carolina Democratic gubernatorial primary runoff
- September 9, 1902
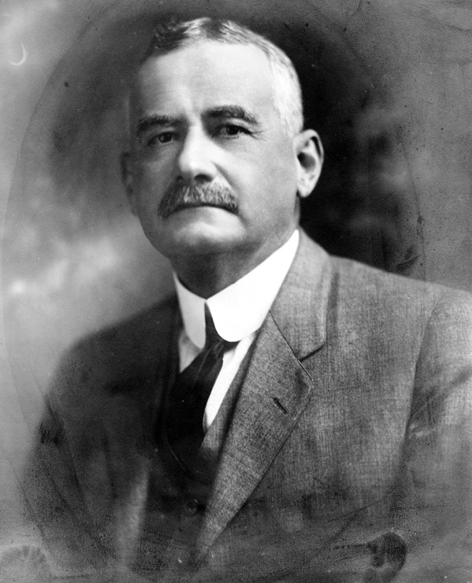

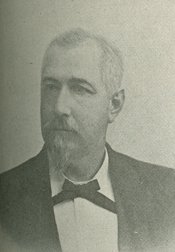
Candidate	Duncan Heyward	W. Jasper Talbert
Party	Democratic	Democratic
Popular vote	50,662	40,490
Percentage	55.58%	44.42%
Governor before election
Miles Benjamin McSweeney
Democratic
Elected Governor
Duncan Clinch Heyward
Democratic

The 1902 South Carolina gubernatorial election was held on November 4, 1902, to select the governor of the state of South Carolina. Duncan Clinch Heyward won the Democratic primary and ran unopposed in the general election to become the 88th governor of South Carolina.

== Democratic primary ==
The South Carolina Democratic Party held their primary for governor on August 26 and Duncan Clinch Heyward emerged as the frontrunner. His victory against W. Jasper Talbert, a congressman of the 2nd congressional district, in the runoff on September 9 came as a surprise because Heyward was relatively unknown outside of Colleton County. Heyward, an aristocratic planter, attributed his win due to running a "clean and sincere campaign."

=== Candidates ===
- Martin Frederick Ansel, former state representative from Greenville and solicitor of the Eighth Judicial Circuit
- Duncan Clinch Heyward, Walterboro rice planter
- W. Jasper Talbert, U.S. Representative from Parksville
- James H. Tillman, Lieutenant Governor and nephew of U.S. Senator Benjamin Tillman
- W. H. Timmerman

=== Results ===
1902 Democratic gubernatorial primary
Party	Candidate	Votes	%
Democratic	Duncan Clinch Heyward	36,551	38.3%
Democratic	W. Jasper Talbert	18,218	19.1%
Democratic	Martin Frederick Ansel	17,685	18.6%
Democratic	James H. Tillman	16,398	17.2%
Democratic	W. H. Timmermann	6,515	6.8%
Total votes		95,367	100.00%

=== Runoff results ===
1902 Democratic gubernatorial runoff
Party	Candidate	Votes	%	±%
Democratic	Duncan Clinch Heyward	50,662	55.6%	▲17.3
Democratic	W. Jasper Talbert	40,490	44.4%	▲25.3
Total votes		91,152	100.00%	

== General election ==
The general election was held on November 4, 1902, and Duncan Clinch Heyward was elected the next governor of South Carolina without opposition. Being a non-presidential election and few contested races, turnout was much less than the previous gubernatorial election.

South Carolina Gubernatorial Election, 1902
Party	Candidate	Votes	%	±%
Democratic	Duncan Clinch Heyward	31,817	100.00	0.0
Majority		31,817	100.00	0.0
Turnout		31,817		
Democratic hold				

65+% won by Heyward

== See also ==
- Governor of South Carolina
- List of governors of South Carolina
- South Carolina gubernatorial elections

== Notes ==
Preceded by 1900	South Carolina gubernatorial elections	Succeeded by 1904
