= SS Thomas T. Tucker =

World War II Liberty ship of the United States

Coordinates: 34°16′23.66″S 18°22′48.33″E

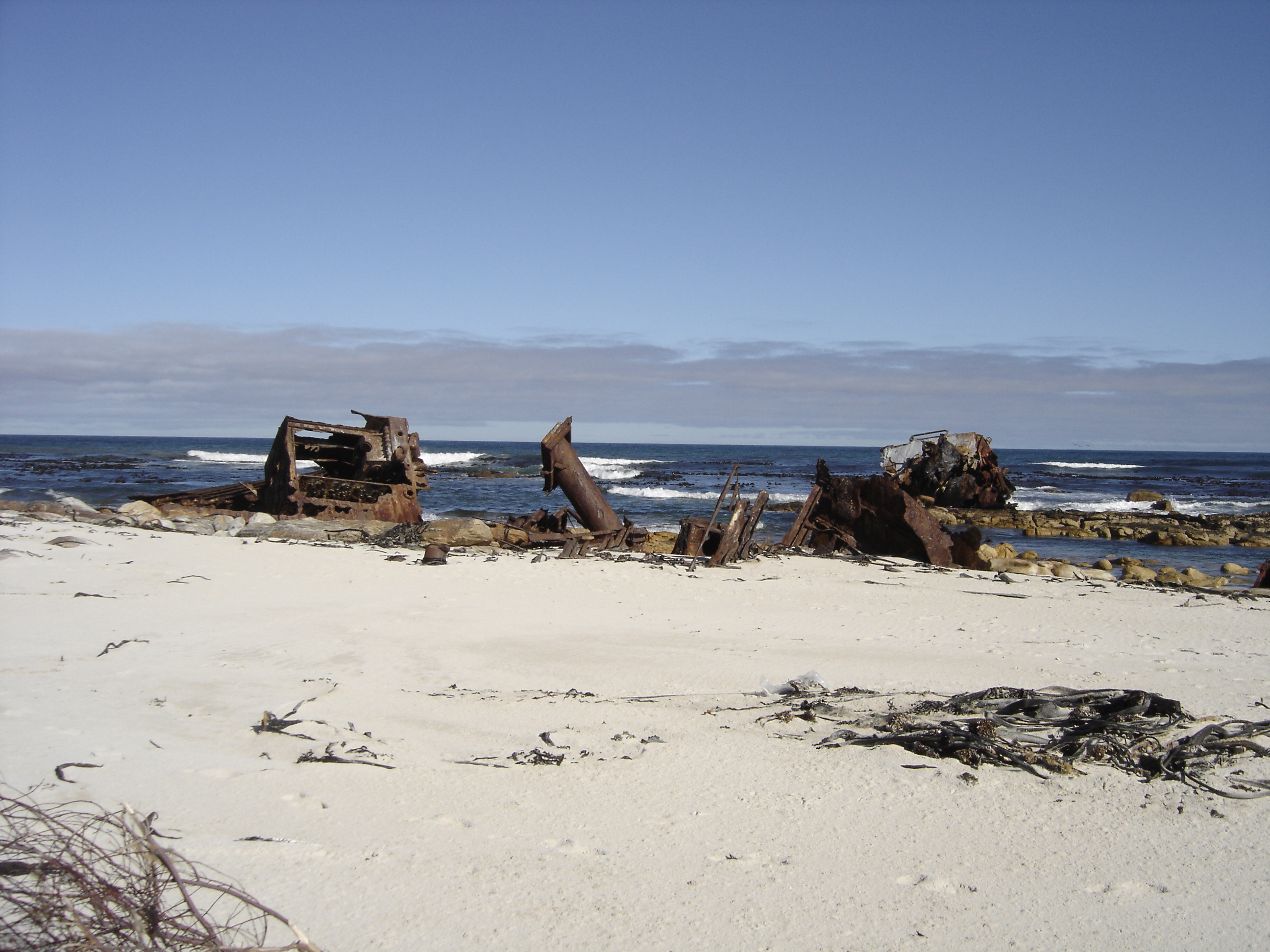
- The Thomas T. Tucker shipwreck Oliphantsbos Point, South Africa

History
- Name: SS Thomas T. Tucker
- Owner: US Navy
- Operator: Merchants & Miners Transportation Company
- Port of registry: United States
- Yard number: 269
- Laid down: June 16, 1942
- Launched: August 31, 1942
- Completed: September 21, 1942
- Out of service: 27 November 1942
- Fate: Ran aground November 27, 1942

General characteristics
- Class & type: EC2-S-C1
- Tonnage: 7,000 tons DWT
- Length: 135 m (443 ft)
- Beam: 17.3 m (57 ft)
- Draft: 8.5 m (28 ft)
- Propulsion: Two oil-fired boilers, triple-expansion steam engine, single propeller, 2500 horsepower (1.9 MW)
- Speed: 11 to 11.5 knots (20 to 21 km/h)
- Capacity: 9,140 tons cargo

The SS Thomas T. Tucker (Hull Number 269) was a Liberty ship built by The Houston Shipbuilding Corporation for service as a troop and weapons carrier.

Liberty ships were named after prominent (deceased) Americans, starting with Patrick Henry and the signers of the Declaration of Independence. She was named after Thomas Tudor Tucker, an American physician and politician from Charleston, South Carolina. He represented South Carolina in both the Continental Congress and the U.S. House. He later served as Treasurer of the United States.

== Career ==
The ship was laid down on June 16, 1942, then launched on August 31, 1942. She was operated by Merchants & Miners Transportation Company under charter with the Maritime Commission and War Shipping Administration. She ran aground off Olifantsbos Point, near Cape Point, on November 27, 1942, during heavy fog while on her maiden voyage from New Orleans to Suez. She was sailing close to the coast due to the German U-boats patrolling the area – and the captain misjudged the ship's location because of the heavy fog. Assuming they were close to Robben Island, and therefore not far from Cape Town, the crew relaxed, and the ship ran aground. After an investigation, it was discovered that the ship's compass was out by 37°, although no conclusive reason was found for the incident.

== Location ==
The wreck is located on stretch of rocks on the shoreline of Olifantsbos Beach, within The Cape of Good Hope Nature Reserve. It is split into three sections with a boiler higher up on the beach.

== See also ==
- List of shipwrecks of the Western Cape.
- Shipwrecks of Cape Town
