= SS William Lawrence Shipwreck Site =

Archaeological site in South Carolina, United States

- U.S. National Register of Historic Places
- Nearest city: Hilton Head Island, South Carolina
- Area: less than one acre
- Built: 1899
- NRHP reference No.: 97000522
- Added to NRHP: February 10, 1998

SS William Lawrence Shipwreck Site is a historic shipwreck and archaeological site located near Hilton Head Island, Beaufort County, South Carolina.

The SS William Lawrence (1869) was built by the Atlantic Ironworks in Boston in 1869. She was ordered by the Merchants and Miners Transportation Company, whose passenger and cargo steamers had been running up and down the East Coast since 1852. The ship wrecked during an ice storm in February 1899.

Some cargo was recovered from the wreck in 1990 and included: leather shoes; fabric; glassware and containers filled with medicine, pickles and preserves; toys; dolls; ornaments; artwork; and comic books.

It was listed in the National Register of Historic Places in 1998.
