= 1908 South Carolina gubernatorial election =

1908 South Carolina Democratic gubernatorial primary
- August 25, 1908
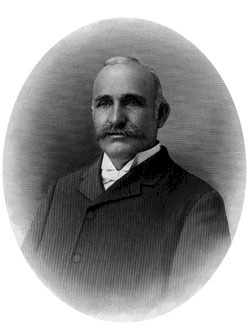

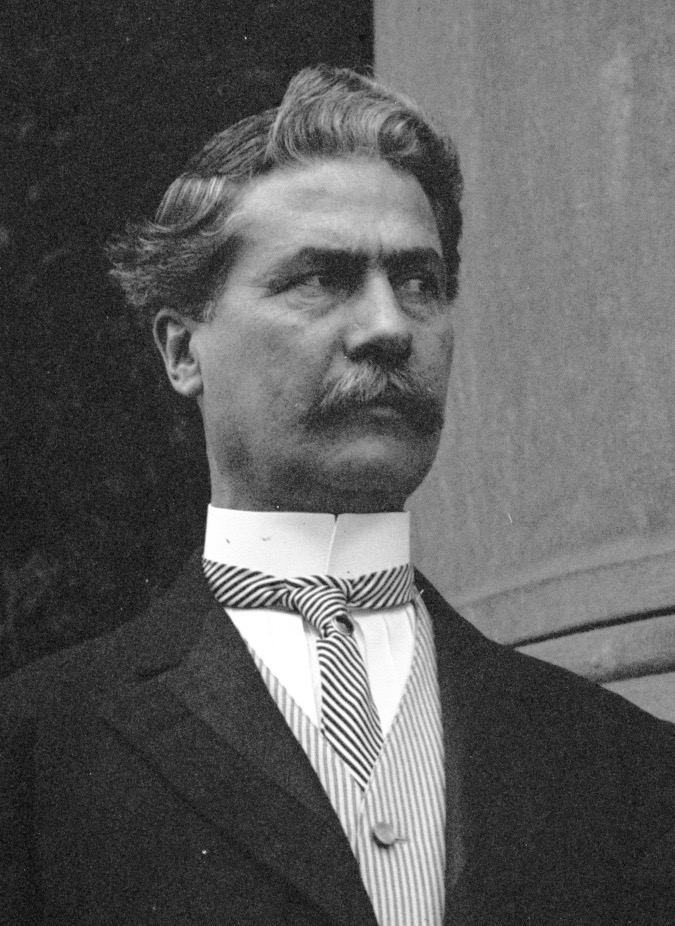
Candidate	Martin Frederick Ansel	Cole Blease
Party	Democratic	Democratic
Popular vote	62,867	42,100
Percentage	59.89%	40.11%
Governor before election
Martin Frederick Ansel
Democratic
Elected Governor
Martin Frederick Ansel
Democratic

The 1908 South Carolina gubernatorial election was held on November 3, 1908, to select the governor of the state of South Carolina. Governor Martin Frederick Ansel faced state senator Coleman Livingston Blease in the Democratic primary and emerged victorious to win a second two-year term as governor.

== Democratic primary ==
Coleman Livingston Blease entered the state Democratic primary for governor as the only opposition to incumbent Governor Martin Frederick Ansel. The voters saw no reason to not give Ansel another term for governor and Blease was defeated rather decisively on August 25.

Democratic Primary
Candidate	Votes	%
Martin Frederick Ansel	62,867	59.9
Coleman Livingston Blease	42,100	40.1

== General election ==
The general election was held on November 3, 1908, and Martin Frederick Ansel was reelected governor of South Carolina without opposition. Turnout increased over the previous gubernatorial election because there was also a presidential election on the ballot.

South Carolina Gubernatorial Election, 1908
Party	Candidate	Votes	%	±%
Democratic	Martin Frederick Ansel (incumbent)	61,060	100.00	0.0
Majority		61,060	100.00	0.0
Turnout		61,060		
Democratic hold				

65+% won by Ansel

== See also ==
- Governor of South Carolina
- List of governors of South Carolina
- South Carolina gubernatorial elections

Preceded by 1906	South Carolina gubernatorial elections	Succeeded by 1910
