= SS Lewis Emery Jr. =

World War II Liberty ship of the United States

History

United States
- Name: Lewis Emery Jr.
- Namesake: Lewis Emery Jr.
- Operator: Merchants & Miners Transportation Company
- Builder: Alabama Drydock and Shipbuilding Company, Mobile, Alabama
- Yard number: 1806
- Laid down: 22 September 1943
- Launched: 15 October 1943
- Fate: Sold private 1947, scrapped 1968

General characteristics
- Class & type: Type EC2-S-C1 Liberty ship
- Propulsion: Single screw

SS Lewis Emery Jr. was a World War II liberty ship built by the Alabama Drydock and Shipbuilding Company at their yard at Mobile, Alabama, and launched on 15 October 1943.

== Namesake ==
Lewis Emery Jr. was the son of Lewis Sr. and Maria (Gilson) Emery; born at Cherry Creek Township, Chautauqua County, New York, 10 August 1839. He moved with parents to Michigan; attended common schools; pursued a career as a miller; moved to Pennsylvania and engaged in the oil business in Titusville; moved again to Bradford, Tioga County, 1875; member of the House of Representatives, 1879; state Senate, 1880–1888; became a wealthy oil man and industrialist, and 1906 Reform Republican candidate for Governor. He married at age 78, Eleta Card of New York City. He died in New York City, 19 November 1924, at age 102.

== Wartime service ==
She was operated by Merchants & Miners Transportation Company charter with the United States Maritime Commission and War Shipping Administration. The Lewis Emery Jr. departed New York Harbor on 18 November 1943 in position 61, the first ship in the sixth column, as part of a convoy to Scotland and Murmansk. The ship departed Loch Ewe at 1530 hrs. on 12 December for a 21-vessel convoy run to Russia, arriving 20 December. Six weeks were spent discharging cargo, taking on chrome ore for ballast and having slit plates repaired.

The ship departed Murmansk in convoy on 3 February 1944, arriving in Scotland on 11 February. It departed for the United States on 14 February in a convoy of 104 ships.

== Post-war ==
Following the end of the war, the ship was sold in 1947 into Greek hands, and was operated by Victory Carriers, Incorporated, a Delaware corporation.

The control of Victory Carriers had been the result of a settlement by Mr. [Aristotle] Onassis of criminal and civil litigation instituted against him by the United States Department of Justice in the early nineteen fifties. He and several other Greek shipowners, including his brother-in-law and rival, Stavros Niarchos, were indicted for violation of United States shipping laws for allegedly having bought United States‐flagships built during World War II and having transferred their ownership to companies controlled by non-citizens of the United States. In 1955 Mr. Onassis settled his dispute with the Government by paying $7 million and placing Victory Carriers in a trust for the benefit of his American born children.

On 24 January 1955, shortly before noon, the Lewis Emery Jr. collided with another Liberty ship, the SS George E. Long, in a dense fog off Coos Bay Bar, Oregon. Both vessels were able to return to the harbor at Coos Bay, Oregon, under their own power. Damage was minor.
