= Robert Watts (disambiguation) =

Robert Watts (1938–2024) was a British film producer.

Robert Watts may also refer to:

- Robert Watts (minister) (1820–1895), Irish Presbyterian minister
- Robert Watts (artist) (1923–1988), American artist
- Robert Watts (priest) (fl. 1740), Irish priest
- Robert Nugent Watts (died 1867), political figure in Canada East

== See also ==
- Robert Watt (disambiguation)
