= 1904 South Carolina gubernatorial election =

- November 8, 1904
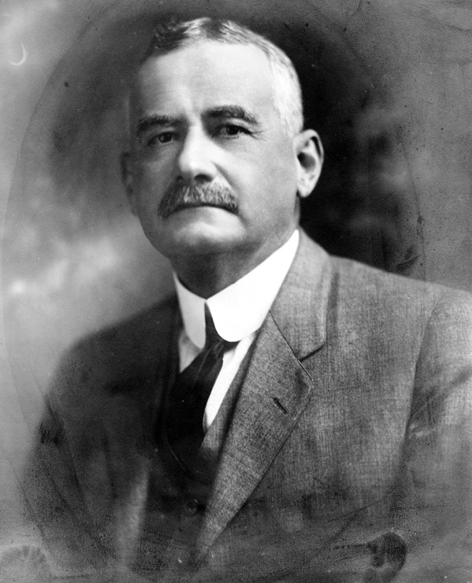
Nominee	Duncan Clinch Heyward
Party	Democratic
Popular vote	52,007
Percentage	100.00%
- County Results; Heyward: 100%
Governor before election
Duncan Clinch Heyward
Democratic
Elected Governor
Duncan Clinch Heyward
Democratic

The 1904 South Carolina gubernatorial election was held on November 8, 1904, to elect the governor of the state of South Carolina. Governor Duncan Clinch Heyward faced no opposition in the Democratic primary nor the general election to win a second two-year term as governor.

== Democratic primary ==
Governor Duncan Clinch Heyward faced no opposition from South Carolina Democrats and avoided a primary election.

== General election ==
The general election was held on November 8, 1904, and Duncan Clinch Heyward was reelected governor of South Carolina without opposition. Turnout increased over the previous gubernatorial election because there was also a presidential election on the ballot.

South Carolina Gubernatorial Election, 1904
Party	Candidate	Votes	%	±%
Democratic	Duncan Clinch Heyward (incumbent)	52,007	100.00	0.0
Majority		52,007	100.00	0.0
Turnout		52,007		
Democratic hold				

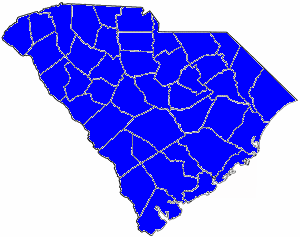
1904 South Carolina gubernatorial election map, by percentile by county. 65+% won by Heyward

== See also ==
- Governor of South Carolina
- List of governors of South Carolina
- South Carolina gubernatorial elections

Preceded by 1902	South Carolina gubernatorial elections	Succeeded by 1906
