= Merchants and Miners Transportation Company =

Major Passengers and Shipping Company

- Industry: Shipping, Passenger
- Founded: 1852 in Baltimore, Maryland, United States
- Defunct: 1952
- Fate: Closed and sold off in 1952
- Area served: East Coast of the United States

SS Suwannee, Merchants and Miners, Queen of Sea ship in 1912

Merchants and Miners Transportation Company, often called M&M and Queen of Sea, was a major cargo and passenger shipping company founded in 1852 in Baltimore, Maryland. In 1852 is started with routes from Baltimore and Boston two wooden side wheelers ships. In 1859 M&M added two iron hulled steamers to its fleet. In 1866, post Civil War, M&M added routes to Providence, Rhode Island, Norfolk and Savannah, Georgia. In 1876 M&M purchased the Baltimore & Savannah Steamship Company add routes to Savannah, Jacksonville and Charleston. In 1907 the Winsor Line of Philadelphia's J. S. Winslow & Company of Portland, Maine was purchased, with seven steamships. The Winsor Line was founded in 1884 by J. S. Winslow. The Winsor Line first route was from Norfolk, Virginia to New England ports, supplying West Virginia coal. The Winsor Line sailing ship Addie M. Lawrence took ammunition to Europe during World War I. By World War II M&M had a fleet of 18 ships and add routes to Miami. With the outbreak of World War II the War Shipping Administration requisitioned Merchants and Miners Transportation Company fleet of ships for the war effort.

During World War II Merchants and Miners Transportation Company operated Merchant navy ships for the United States Shipping Board. During World War II Merchants and Miners Transportation Company was active with charter shipping with the Maritime Commission and War Shipping Administration. Merchants and Miners Transportation Company operated Liberty ships for the merchant navy. The ship was run by its Merchants and Miners Transportation Company crew and the US Navy supplied United States Navy Armed Guards to man the deck guns and radio.

Post World War II, with an aging fleet of ships, the shareholders sold off the fleet of ships, did not buy any surplus warships and closed in 1948.

== Jacob S. Winslow ==
Captain Jacob S. Winslow (1827–1902) founded the sailing ship company Winsor Line in 1861, he was born in Pembroke, Maine. He started as a seaman at age 14 and at 19 was the captain of his own ship. He had two shipyards that built over 100 ships, one in Portland, the Winslow Shipbuilding Company and one in Pembroke, Yarmouth County, Nova Scotia, Canada. In 1919 Captain W.A. Magee joined Winslow Shipbuilding Company as VP and GM. Winslow was an abolitionist and politically active, he had the nickname of "barefoot". Winslow married Philena Morton (1832–1877) in 1853.

== Mary Butts v. Merchants & Miners Transportation Company ==
This landmark case was brought by Mary F. Butts against the Merchants & Miners Transportation Company. It was argued by the Supreme Court of the United States on January 21, 1913 and decided on June 16, 1913, the opinion written by Justice Willis Van Devanter. The Supreme Court ruled in favor of the Plaintiff, Mary F. Butts, that "This Court holds that it was the evident intent of Congress, in enacting the Civil Rights Act, to provide for its uniform operation in all places in the states as well as the territories within the jurisdiction of the United States, aud[sic] that it was not the intent of Congress that the provisions of the statute should be applicable only to such places.'

== Ships ==
- Merchants and Miners Transportation Company ships:
  - SS William Lawrence (1869) a historic shipwreck and archaeological site off Hilton Head Island, South Carolina
  - SS Dorchester
  - SS Yorktown (1894)
  - USS Vulcan (1884)
  - SS Telena
  - SS Suwannee, sold in 1917 to Savannah Line, renamed City of Rome. Sank 25 September 1925 after a collision with USS S-51 (SS-162).

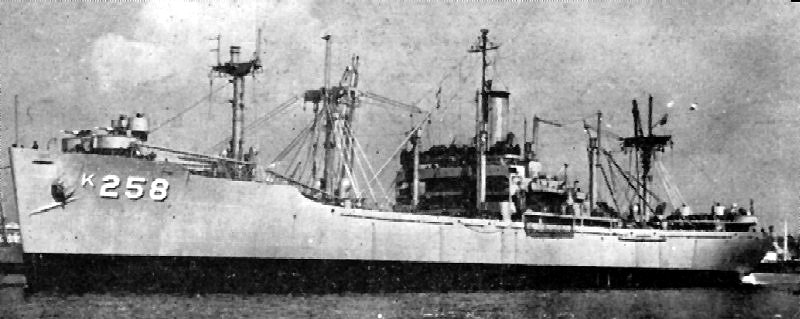
A Victory ship of World War II

Liberty ship of World War II

- World War II ships:
- Victory ship:
  - Pachaug Victory
- Liberty ships:
  - Harry L. Glucksman
  - Dudley H. Thomas
  - M. E. Comerford
  - Mack Bruton Bryan
  - Milan R. Stefanik
  - B. Charney Vladeck
  - Nathaniel Alexander
  - SS Lewis Emery Jr.
  - Will Rogers
  - William Few
  - Albert C. Ritchie
  - Amelia Earhart
  - Edward A. Savoy
  - Dolly Madison
  - SS Thomas T. Tucker, sank 1942

== All ships owned ==
All ships owned by Merchants and Miners Transportation Company:

Ship Name	Year built
Alleghany (1)	1881
Alleghany (2)	1923
America	1863
Aries	1862
Benjamin Deford	1859
Berkshire (1)	1881
Berkshire (2)	1923
Blackstone	1868
Chatham (1)	1884
Chatham (2)	1926
Cretan	1882
Decatur H. Miller	1879
Dorchester (1)	1889
Dorchester (2)	1926
Essex	1890
Fairfax (1)	1891
Fairfax (2)	1926
Frederick	
Fung Shuey	1864
George Appold	1864
Gloucester	1893
Grecian	1900
Howard	1895
Hudson	1874
Indian	1890
Irwin	1918
Itasca	
Johns Hopkins	1873
Joseph Whitney	1854
Juniata	1897
Kent	1918
Kershaw	1899
Lexington (1)	1877
Lexington (2)	1920
McClellan	
Merrimack (1)	
Merrimack (2)	1920
Nantucket	1919
New Orleans	1872
Ontario	1904
Parthian	1887
Persian	1882
Powhatan	1894
Providence	1920
Quantico (1)	1882
Quantico (2)	1919
Roanoke	1919
S. R. Spalding	1859
Saragossa	1863
Somerset	
State of Texas	1874
Suwannee	1911
Tuscan	1907
Upshur	1919
Volusia	1920
William Crane	1871
William Jenkins	1855
William Kennedy	1864
William Lawrence	1869
Wyoming	1919
York (1)	1918
York (2)	1920

== See also ==
- World War II United States Merchant Navy
