= Josef Alexander =

American composer (1907–1992)

- Born: May 15, 1907; Boston, U.S.
- Died: February 28, 1992 (aged 84); New York City, U.S.
- Occupation: Composer

Josef Alexander (May 15, 1907 – February 28, 1992) was an American composer and teacher. He studied at the New England Conservatory of Music in Boston (graduated, 1925; postgraduate diploma, 1926), with Walter Piston (composition) and E.B. Hill (orchestration) at Harvard University (B.A., 1938; M.A., 1941), with Nadia Boulanger in Paris (1939), and with Aaron Copland (composition) and Serge Koussevitzky (conducting) at the Berkshire Music Center in Tanglewood (1940). He taught at Brooklyn College of the City University of New York (1943–77).

His compositions have been performed by orchestras including the New York Philharmonic and the NBC Symphony. For 35 years, he taught music at Brooklyn College and was president of the New York chapter of the National Association of Composers. In 1955 and 1956, he held a Fulbright fellowship as a composer in residence in Finland.

Compositions include A New England Overture for orchestra, published by G. Schirmer; Three Symphonic Odes for men's chorus and orchestra; Les Litanies de Satan for voice and piano; Gitanjali with words by Rabindranath Tagore for soprano, harpsichord, and thirty percussion instruments.
