= 1906 Connecticut lieutenant gubernatorial election =

- November 6, 1906
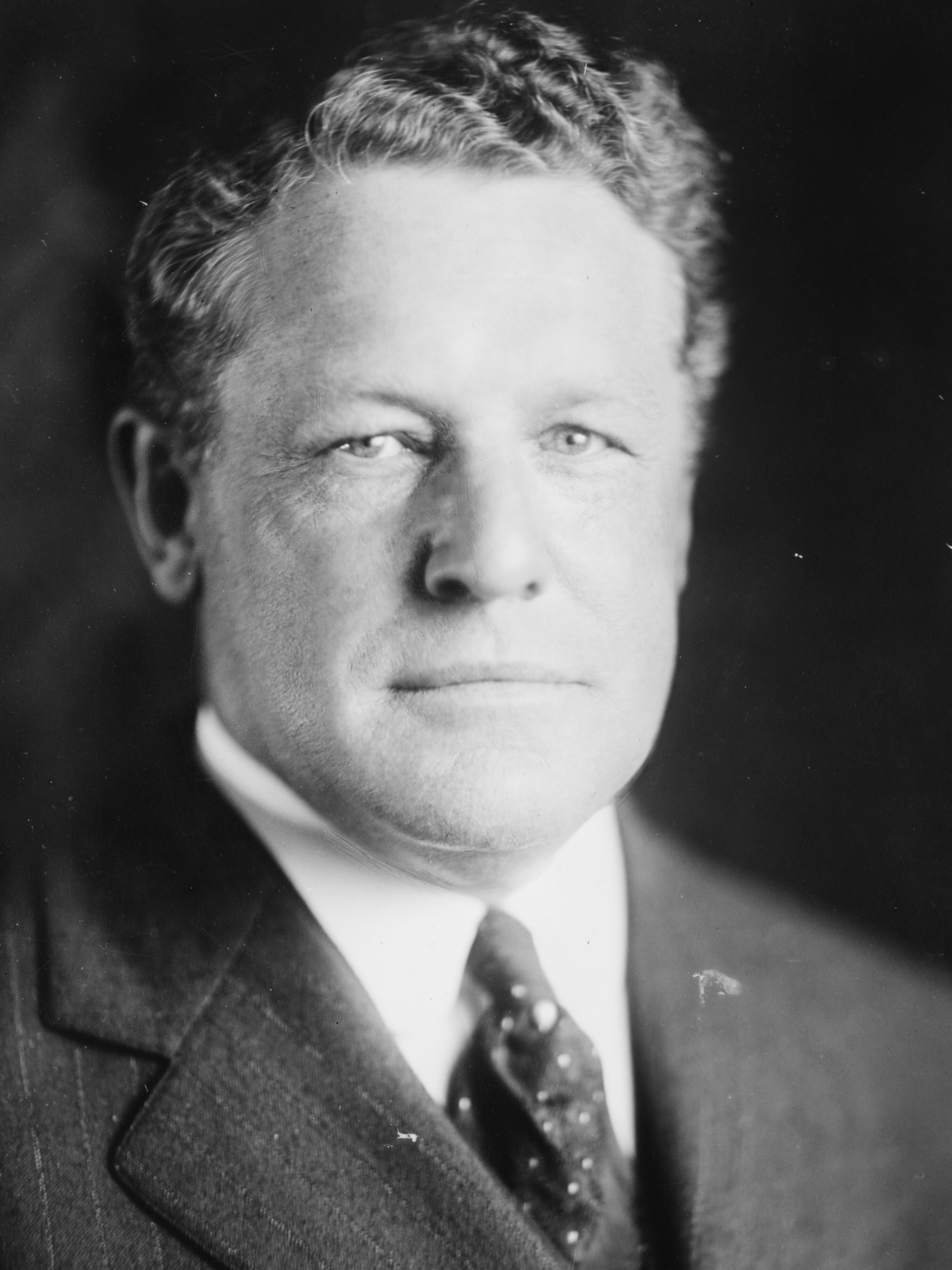

Nominee	Everett J. Lake	John M. Ney
Party	Republican	Democratic
Popular vote	88,449	67,774
Percentage	56.60%	43.40%
Lieutenant Governor before election
Rollin S. Woodruff
Republican
Elected Lieutenant Governor
Everett J. Lake
Republican

The 1906 Connecticut lieutenant gubernatorial election was held on November 6, 1906, to elect the lieutenant governor of Connecticut. Republican nominee and incumbent member of the Connecticut Senate Everett J. Lake won the election against Democratic nominee and former member of the Connecticut Senate John M. Ney.

== General election ==
On election day, November 6, 1906, Republican nominee Everett J. Lake won the election with 56.60% of the vote, thereby retaining Republican control over the office of lieutenant governor. Lake was sworn in as the 72nd lieutenant governor of Connecticut on January 9, 1907.

=== Results ===
Connecticut lieutenant gubernatorial election, 1906
Party	Candidate	Votes	%
Republican	Everett J. Lake	88,449	56.60
Democratic	John M. Ney	67,774	43.40
Total votes		156,223	100.00
Republican hold			
