= 1906 United States elections =

- ← 1904 1905 1906 1907 1908 → Midterm elections
- Election day: November 6
- Incumbent president: ▌Theodore Roosevelt (R)
- Next Congress: 60th

Senate elections
- Overall control: Republican hold
- Seats contested: 30 of 90 seats
- Net seat change: Republican +3
- Results of the elections: Democratic gain Democratic hold Republican gain Republican hold Legislature failed to elect

House elections
- Overall control: Republican hold
- Seats contested: All 391 voting seats
- Net seat change: Democratic +32

Gubernatorial elections
- Seats contested: 28
- Net seat change: Democratic +2
- 1906 gubernatorial election results Democratic gain Democratic hold Republican gain Republican hold Silver hold

Elections were held for the 60th United States Congress.They occurred in the middle of the Republican President Theodore Roosevelt's second and only full term, during the Fourth Party System. The Republicans retained control of both houses of Congress.

The Democrats won several seats in the House, but the Republicans retained a solid majority in the chamber.

In the Senate, Republicans won moderate gains and maintained their commanding majority in the chamber.

This marked the most recent time in which a sitting two-term Republican president retained both chambers of Congress after his second midterm.

== See also ==
- 1906 United States House of Representatives elections
- 1906–07 United States Senate elections
- 1906 United States gubernatorial elections
