= Bob Watt (footballer) =

Australian rules footballer

Personal information
- Full name: Robert Maxwell Watt
- Born: 21 April 1933; South Melbourne, Victoria
- Died: 15 January 1984 (aged 50); South Caulfield
- Original team: Caulfield City
- Height: 188 cm (6 ft 2 in)
- Weight: 85 kg (187 lb)
- Position: Ruck / Defence

Playing career^{1}
Years	Club	Games (Goals)
1952–57	St Kilda	46 (10)
- ^{1} Playing statistics correct to the end of 1957.

Robert Maxwell Watt (21 April 1933 – 15 January 1984) was an Australian rules footballer who played with St Kilda in the Victorian Football League (VFL).

== Family ==
The son of William John Watt (1911–1985), and Flora Emily Watt (1914–1995), née McNamara, Robert Maxwell Watt was born at South Melbourne, Victoria on 21 April 1933.

He married Barbara Dorothy Turner (?-2006) in 1958. The AFLW footballer Rhiannon Watt is his granddaughter.

== Football ==
=== St Kilda (VFL) ===
He made his debut for St Kilda against Fitzroy, at the Junction Oval, in the final match of the 1952 season, on 30 Aug 1952. He played in 46 games (kicking 10 goals) for the St Kilda First XVIII over six seasons (1952 to 1957).

== Death ==
He died at South Caulfield on 15 January 1984.
