= 1906 Wisconsin lieutenant gubernatorial election =

- November 6, 1906
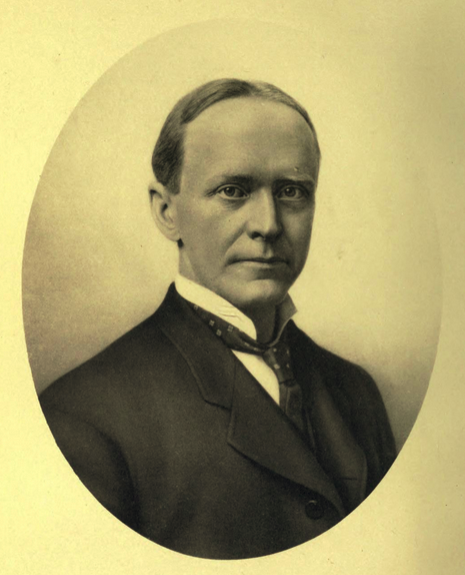

| Nominee | William D. Connor | Michael F. Blenski | William Kaufmann |
| Party | Republican | Democratic | Social Democratic |
| Popular vote | 174,666 | 104,392 | 24,910 |
| Percentage | 55.74% | 33.31% | 7.95% |
Lieutenant Governor before election
James O. Davidson
Republican
Elected Lieutenant Governor
William D. Connor
Republican

The 1906 Wisconsin lieutenant gubernatorial election was held on November 6, 1906, in order to elect the lieutenant governor of Wisconsin. Republican nominee William D. Connor defeated Democratic nominee and former member of the Wisconsin State Assembly Michael F. Blenski, Social Democratic nominee William Kaufmann and Prohibition nominee August F. Fehlandt.

== General election ==
On election day, November 6, 1906, Republican nominee William D. Connor won the election by a margin of 70,274 votes against his foremost opponent Democratic nominee Michael F. Blenski, thereby retaining Republican control over the office of lieutenant governor. Connor was sworn in as the 20th lieutenant governor of Wisconsin on January 7, 1907.

=== Results ===
Wisconsin lieutenant gubernatorial election, 1906
| Party | Candidate | Votes | % |
|---|---|---|---|
| Republican | William D. Connor | 174,666 | 55.74 |
| Democratic | Michael F. Blenski | 104,392 | 33.31 |
| Social Democratic | William Kaufmann | 24,910 | 7.95 |
| Prohibition | August F. Fehlandt | 8,887 | 2.84 |
| | Scattering | 510 | 0.16 |
| Total votes | | 313,365 | 100.00 |
| Republican hold | | | |
