= 1904 Maine gubernatorial election =

- September 12, 1904
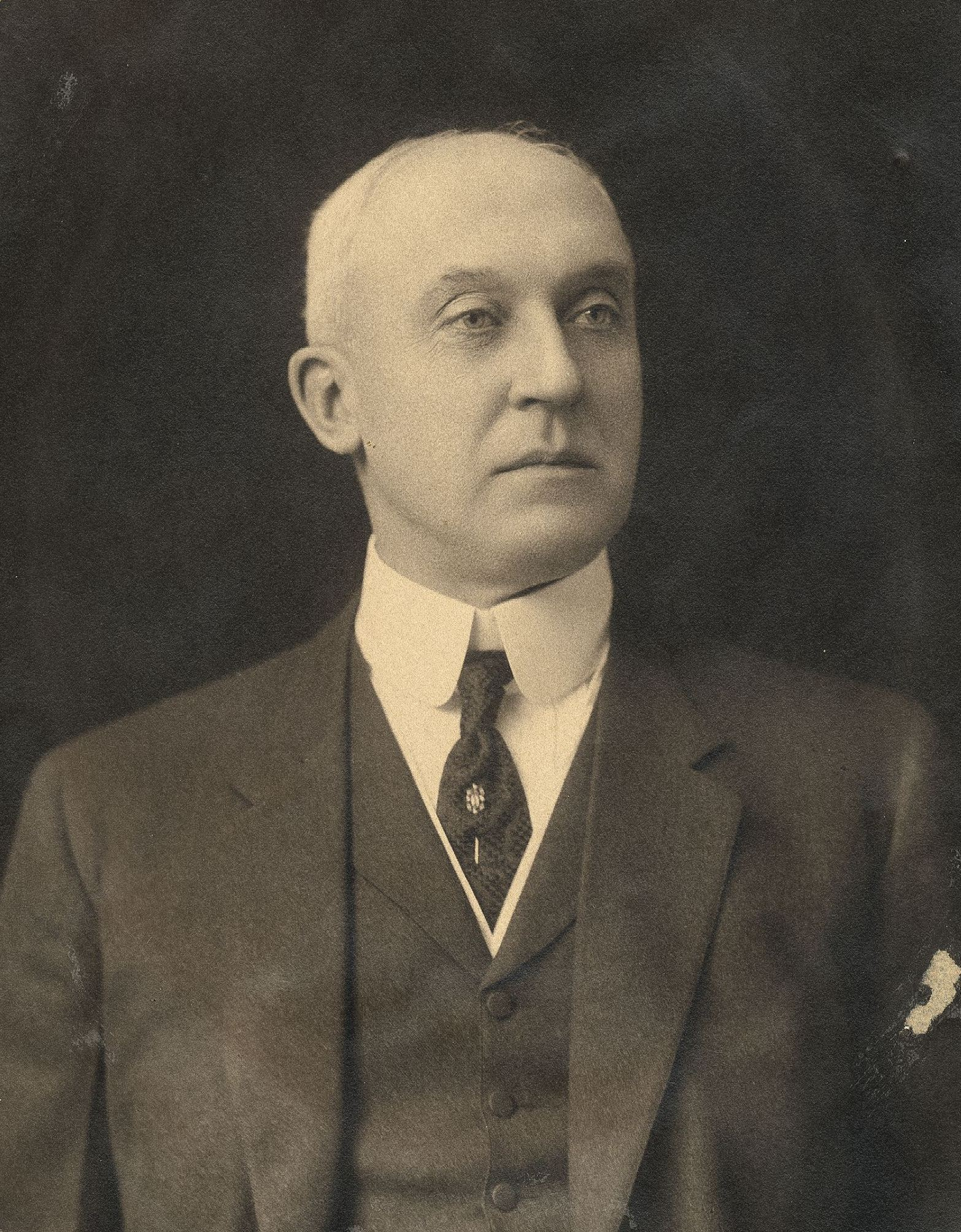

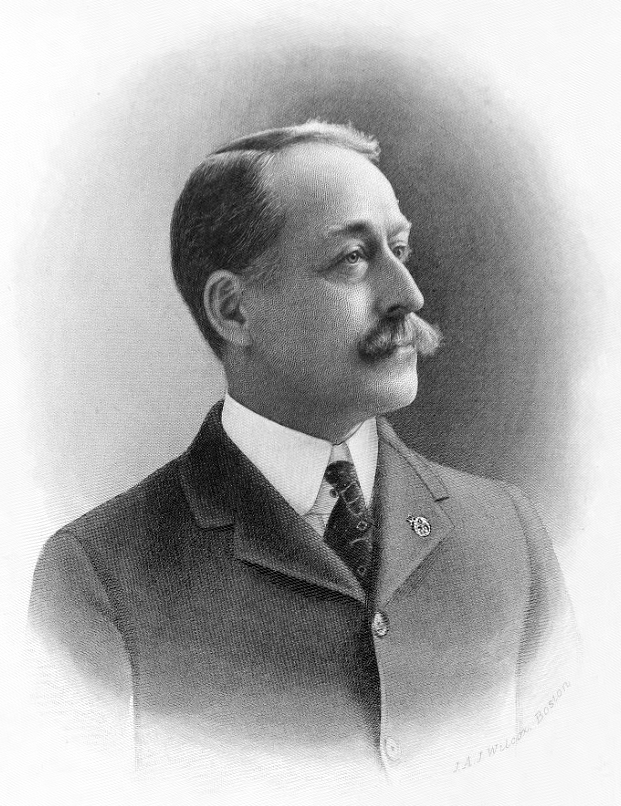
Nominee	William T. Cobb	Cyrus W. Davis
Party	Republican	Democratic
Popular vote	76,962	50,146
Percentage	58.52%	38.13%
- County results Cobb: 40–50% 50–60% 60–70% 70–80% Davis: 40–50%
Governor before election
John Fremont Hill
Republican
Elected Governor
William T. Cobb
Republican

The 1904 Maine gubernatorial election took place on September 12, 1904.

Incumbent Governor John Fremont Hill did not seek re-election. Republican candidate William T. Cobb defeated Democratic candidate Cyrus W. Davis.

== Results ==
1904 Maine gubernatorial election (Note: The Maine House Journal records the result as Cobb 75,816, Davis 49,949, Woodbury 2,782, Hapgood 1,576, scattering 23.)
Party	Candidate	Votes	%	±%
Republican	William T. Cobb	76,962	58.52%	
Democratic	Cyrus W. Davis	50,146	38.13%	
Prohibition	Nathan F. Woodbury	2,788	2.12%	
Socialist	Wilbur G. Hapgood	1,590	1.21%	
Scattering		26	0.02%	
Majority		26,816	20.39%	
Turnout		131,512	100.00%	
Republican hold		Swing		
