= National Rural Education Association =

American non-profit organization

- Formation: 1907
- Location(s): University of Tennessee at Chattanooga; Chattanooga, TN
- Executive Director: Dr. Allen Pratt
- Key people: Allison Nys (President); David Ardrey (President Elect)
- Website: https://nrea.net/

The National Rural Education Association (NREA) is a non-profit organization dedicated to promoting the interests of schools and educators in rural and sparsely populated areas of the United States. The NREA is a membership organization that operates as a tax-exempt, non-profit entity. It is directed by an elected executive committee consisting of national representatives of rural school administrators, rural school teachers, state education agencies, educational service agencies, higher education, rural district school boards, and at-large constituencies. The NREA has approximately 8,000 voting and non-voting members from all 50 states.

== Purpose ==
Article III, Section 1 of the NREA bylaws states, "The purpose of the Association shall be the improvement and the expansion of educational opportunities for children in rural communities throughout the United States and the world." To this end, the NREA lists the following as its stated objectives:

- To serve as a national advocate and representative for rural education at all levels: Local-State-Regional-National
- To provide coordination, at the national level, for rural education programs and activities
- To provide leadership for rural education-related conferences and workshops
- To provide a forum for all those involved in public education in rural areas-including teachers, administrators, board members, and members of the rural community at large whereby they may come together professionally and exchange ideas.
- To promote state, regional and local delivery systems which bring about efficient and effective education for children in rural areas
- To encourage the collection and dissemination of promising practices, statistical data, and other appropriate information relating to rural education as well as coordinating the sharing of services and resources among educational organizations and agencies
- To encourage colleges and universities to develop materials and resources specifically for rural schools and to train school personnel to work more effectively in small schools
- To stimulate discussion, research, and policy development regarding equal educational opportunities for all students
- To stress the need for public and private agencies to develop specific educational materials and technology appropriate to children in rural areas

== History ==
The history of the organization can be divided into several sections. (Note: The following historical information quotes extensively from Popham, C., (2007). An Historical Perspective of the NREA. In Hodges, V. P. (Ed.) National Rural Education Association: Celebrating 100 Years 1907-2007 (pp. 8-10). Rich Hill, MO: Bell Books.)

=== The early days, 1907-1945 ===
The NREA was founded in 1907 by 28 individuals who petitioned the board of directors of the National Education Association for approval as a new department within the organization. Its title for the next ten years was the Department of Rural and Agricultural Education. The first president of the new organization was elected in 1908 at the NEA meeting in Cleveland, Ohio. For the next ten years, with one exception, the presidents of the new department were presidents or deans of agricultural or normal schools or land grant colleges. The one exception was a superintendent of schools.

In 1918 three professional groups, the National Association of State Supervisors and Inspectors of Rural Schools, the County Superintendent section of the NEA, and the National Association of Personnel Engaged in Preparation of Rural Educators joined the Department of Rural Education. For the first time, agricultural education was no longer included in the title of the organization and there was an evident change in the leadership of the organization in the succeeding ten years. During that period, only six of the presidents were from colleges or universities and only one of those six was associated with an agricultural school. The other presidents of the Department of Rural Education were school administrators.

=== New alliances, 1946-1975 ===
The group representing rural educators continued as a viable organization through two world wars and a devastating depression. There was a national meeting every year and the group annually elected presidents to lead the organization. In 1946 at the annual meeting of the rural educators in Des Moines, Iowa, the first meeting of the Division of County and Intermediate Unit Superintendents (CIUS) was held and the group elected a president. The two groups continued as separate organizations; however, by 1957 the business meetings of the rural education group were held at the County and Intermediate Unit Superintendents (CUIS) annual meeting which always preceded the annual meeting of the American Association of School Administrators (AASA). During these years the presidents of the Department of Rural Education were local and county superintendents and education professors.

In 1968 the association became the Rural Education Association, and in the following year CUIS elected its last president. It appears that the two groups that had been meeting together apparently merged their meeting dates, their leaders, and their goals. The growth of the adversary relationship between teachers’ organizations and administrators must have resulted in an uncomfortable relationship between the Rural Education Association and its sponsoring organization, the National Rural Education Association. The rural department had expanded over the years to include county and intermediate superintendents and the leadership of the organization most often was from the ranks of administrators or representatives of higher education. Therefore, in 1975, the Rural Education Association was listed for the first time as a non-governance affiliate of the NEA. And the very next year the group voted to rename itself the Rural/Regional Education Association.

=== Defining the organization, 1975-1986 ===
The years between 1975 and 1980 were difficult ones for the organization. The relationship with the sponsoring organization NEA had become stressful as NEA's mission changed and appeared to be in conflict with the majority of membership of REA. At the same time, serious questions arose about the quality of services being provided to REA by the NEA staff. Most of the members of REA were rural school administrators, administrators of intermediate units, and college or university personnel. The administrators from the intermediate units were concerned about the issues facing rural schools, because in many cases, these schools were their predominate clients. These superintendents felt more comfortable in association with other administrators. During these five years R/REA members were occupied with issues concerning affiliation such as whether the organization should continue its affiliation with NEA or become an independent organization and employ an executive director whose first allegiance would be to REA.

Each option had it proponents. A small group of the members representative of each of the groups within the membership worked for several months considering the options. By the 1980 annual meeting in Portland, OR, this group, chaired by Anita Lohr, Superintendent of Pima County, AZ, presented the membership with the first set of bylaws. The membership voted to institute several controversial changes during this meeting including:

- discontinuing affiliation with NEA
- issuing a contract with Colorado State University to provide administrative services for REA
- purchasing the service of an executive director on a part-time basis (Joseph T. Newlin was appointed to this position in the fall of 1980)
- creating a delegate assembly to become the policy making body of the organization, and
- raising annual membership dues from $15 to $50.

Some members felt that the dues issue would be the end of the organization because people would not be willing to pay $50 to belong to REA. Others were upset because affiliation with AASA had been rejected. After 1980 the organization was different. Some members chose not to renew their membership. AASA created an affiliate for educational service agencies (AAESA), and some of the intermediate unit superintendents dropped from REA, but many chose to hold dual membership. Several of the people responsible for the development of the AAESA had been leaders in REA, and today there exists a common bond between the memberships of the two organizations.

As the organization worked to define its mission, two charges surfaced from it – resolutions, and from the program – budget decisions. These changes were (1) to be the national voice for rural education, and (2) to sponsor the research that would provide validity to that “voice.” So important was the concept of being a national voice, the organization once again changed its name in 1986 to the National Rural Education Association.

== Organization ==
In addition to the executive committee, the NREA has two governing bodies: the Membership Meeting and the Delegate Assembly, made up of two representatives (and two alternates) from each of the fifty states. Affiliate organizations also have one delegate to represent them at the Annual Delegate Assembly. This group meets annually at the Annual Convention. The Delegate Assembly hears reports from standing committees and passes on resolutions, policy matters, and other policies of the Association.

== Membership ==
Membership to the NREA is open to any and all who have an interest in issues related to rural education. Membership dues vary depending on the type of membership, for instance, membership for students may be obtained at a discounted rate.

== Publications ==
The Rural Educator is the official journal of the NREA. It is a peer-reviewed journal published three times per year.

The NREA Update is an electronic newsletter which is distributed to the NREA membership each week.
