= Cyrus W. Davis =

American politician

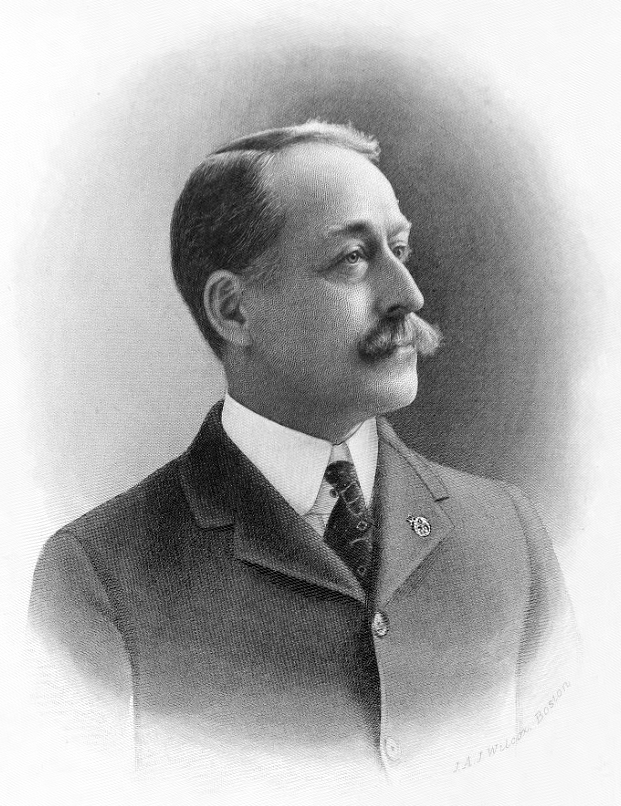

Secretary of State of Maine
- In office 1911–1913

Mayor of Waterville, Maine
- In office 1903–1904

Personal details
- Born: Cyrus William Davis; September 25, 1856 Buxton, Maine, US
- Died: November 1, 1917 (aged 61) Portland, Maine, US
- Resting place: Pine Grove Cemetery
- Party: Democratic
- Spouse: Flora E. Philbrook (m. 1879)
- Children: 2

Cyrus William Davis (September 25, 1856 – November 1, 1917) was an American politician from Maine. Davis was a Democrat from Waterville, Maine. He served as that city's mayor from 1903 to 1904 and as Secretary of State of Maine from 1911 to 1913.

== Biography ==
Cyrus W. Davis was born in Buxton, Maine on September 25, 1856.

He married Flora E. Philbrook in 1879, and they had two children.

He died from pneumonia at his home in Portland on November 1, 1917. He is interred at Pine Grove Cemetery in Waterville.

The following newspaper article is from the scrapbook of John J. Turner (1858–1937), who knew Davis from Mr. Turner's time at Casco Castle in South Freeport, Maine, from 1902 to 1911.

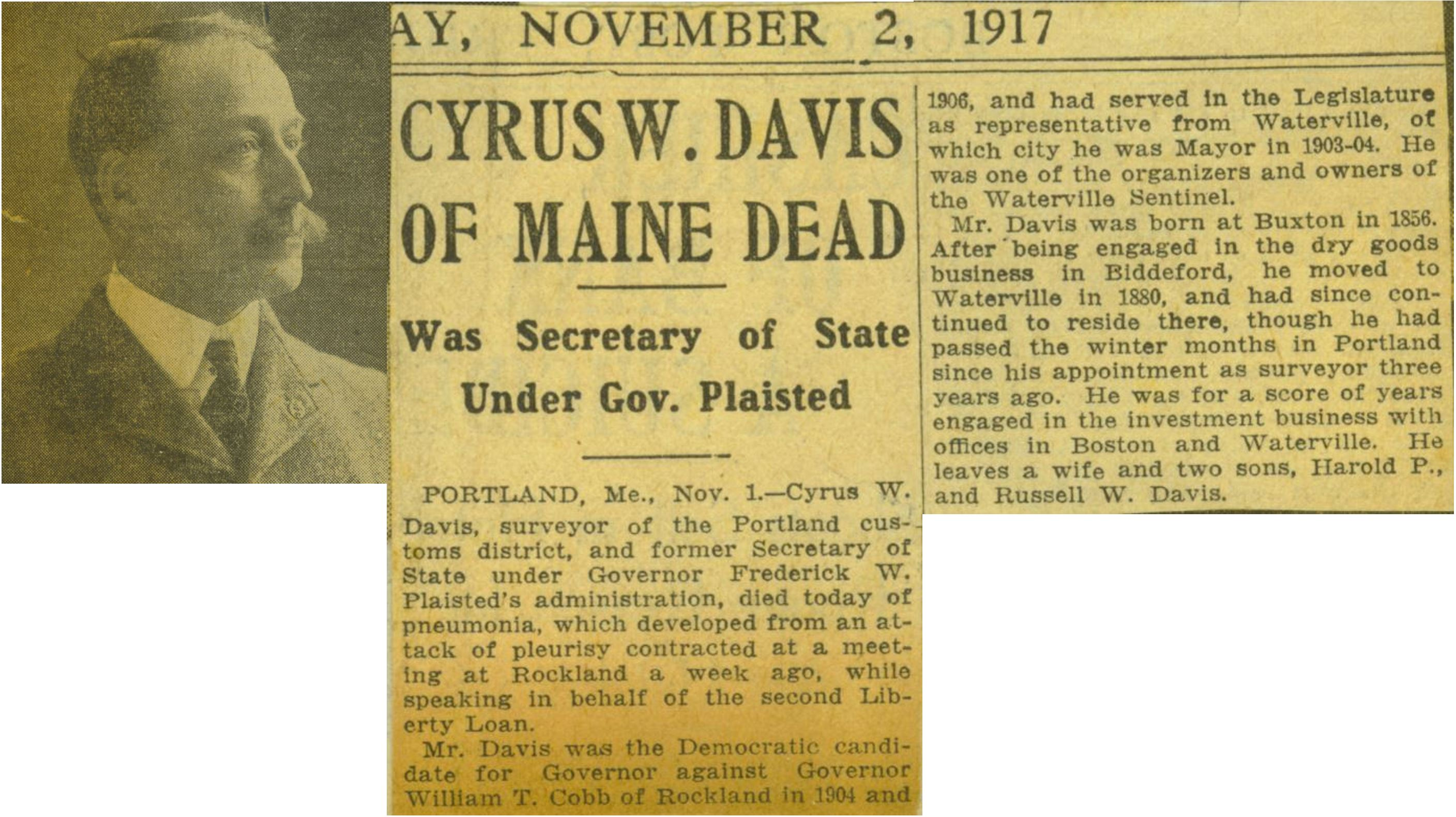
Cyrus W. Davis' death.

Text of the newspaper article:

Friday, November 2, 1917
Cyrus W. Davis of Maine Dead
Was Secretary of State Under Gov. Plaisted
Portland, Me., Nov. 1
Cyrus W. Davis, surveyor of the Portland customs district, and former Secretary of State under Governor Frederick W. Plaisted's administration, died today of pneumonia, which developed from an attack of pleurisy contracted at a meeting at Rockland a week ago, while speaking in behalf of the second Liberty Loan.

Mr. Davis was the Democratic candidate for Governor against Governor William T. Cobb of Rockland in 1904 and 1906, and had served in the legislature as representative from Waterville, of which he was Mayor in 1903-04. He was one of the organizers and owners of the Waterville Sentinel.

Mr. Davis was born at Buxton in 1856. After being engaged in the dry goods business in Biddeford, he moved to Waterville in 1880, and had since continued to reside there, though he had passed the winter months in Portland since his appointment as surveyor three years ago. He was for a score of years engaged in the investment business with offices in Boston and Waterville. He leaves a wife and two sons, Harold P., and Russell W. Davis.

Party political offices
Preceded by Samuel Wadsworth Gould	Democratic nominee for Governor of Maine; 1904, 1906	Succeeded by Obadiah Gardner
Political offices
Preceded by Arthur I. Brown	Secretary of State of Maine; 1911–1912	Succeeded by Joseph E. Alexander
