= 1906 South Carolina gubernatorial election =

1906 South Carolina Democratic gubernatorial primary runoff
- September 11, 1906
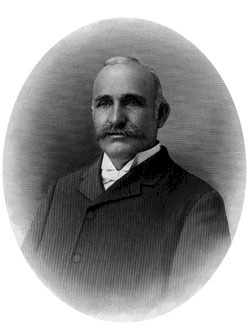

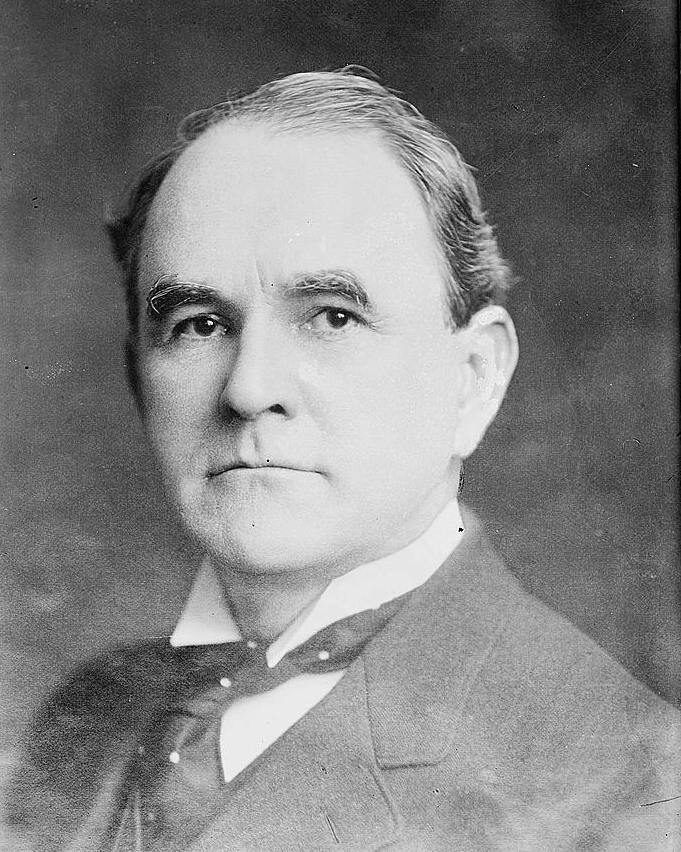
Candidate	Martin Frederick Ansel	Richard Irvine Manning III
Party	Democratic	Democratic
Popular vote	47,638	37,245
Percentage	56.12%	43.88%
Governor before election
Duncan Clinch Heyward
Democratic
Elected Governor
Martin Frederick Ansel
Democratic

The 1906 South Carolina gubernatorial election was held on November 6, 1906, to select the governor of the state of South Carolina, United States. Martin Frederick Ansel won the Democratic primary and ran unopposed in the general election to become the 89th governor of South Carolina.

== Democratic primary ==
The South Carolina Democratic Party held its primary for governor on August 28 and Martin Frederick Ansel emerged as the frontrunner. Ansel was vocal in his opposition to the Dispensary system set up by Ben Tillman and instead favored the local county option established by the Bryce law in 1904. His chief rival, progressive reformer Richard Irvine Manning III, sought to maintain a statewide Dispensary and work to remove all the corrupt officials in it. The public sentiment at the time felt that nobody with even the best intentions could clean up the Dispensary and therefore Ansel won the Democratic runoff on September 11 against Manning. He essentially became the next governor of South Carolina because there was no opposition in the general election.

Democratic Primary
Candidate	Votes	%
Martin Frederick Ansel	39,850	41.2
Richard Irvine Manning III	23,008	23.8
Coleman Livingston Blease	16,801	17.4
J.E. Brunson	9,982	10.3
John T. Sloan	3,348	3.5
John Joseph McMahan	2,231	2.3
A.C. Jones	898	0.9
W.A. Edwards	530	0.6

Democratic Primary Runoff
Candidate	Votes	%	±%
Martin Frederick Ansel	47,638	56.1	+14.9
Richard Irvine Manning III	37,245	43.9	+20.1

== General election ==
The general election was held on November 6, 1906, and Martin Frederick Ansel was elected the next governor of South Carolina without opposition. Being a non-presidential election and few contested races, turnout was much less than the previous gubernatorial election.

South Carolina Gubernatorial Election, 1906
Party	Candidate	Votes	%	±%
Democratic	Martin Frederick Ansel	30,251	100.00	0.0
Majority		30,251	100.00	0.0
Turnout		30,251		
Democratic hold				

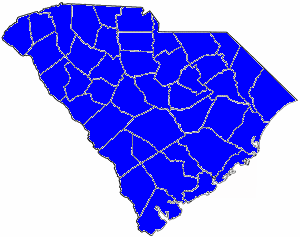
1906 South Carolina gubernatorial election map, by percentile by county. 65+% won by Ansel

== See also ==
- Governor of South Carolina
- List of governors of South Carolina
- South Carolina gubernatorial elections

Preceded by 1904	South Carolina gubernatorial elections	Succeeded by 1908
