= 1906 Danish local elections =

Regional elections were held in Denmark in January 1906. 438 municipal council members were elected among the middle class. An additional 6 municipal council members were elected in Copenhagen.
