= 1906 Maine gubernatorial election =

- September 10, 1906
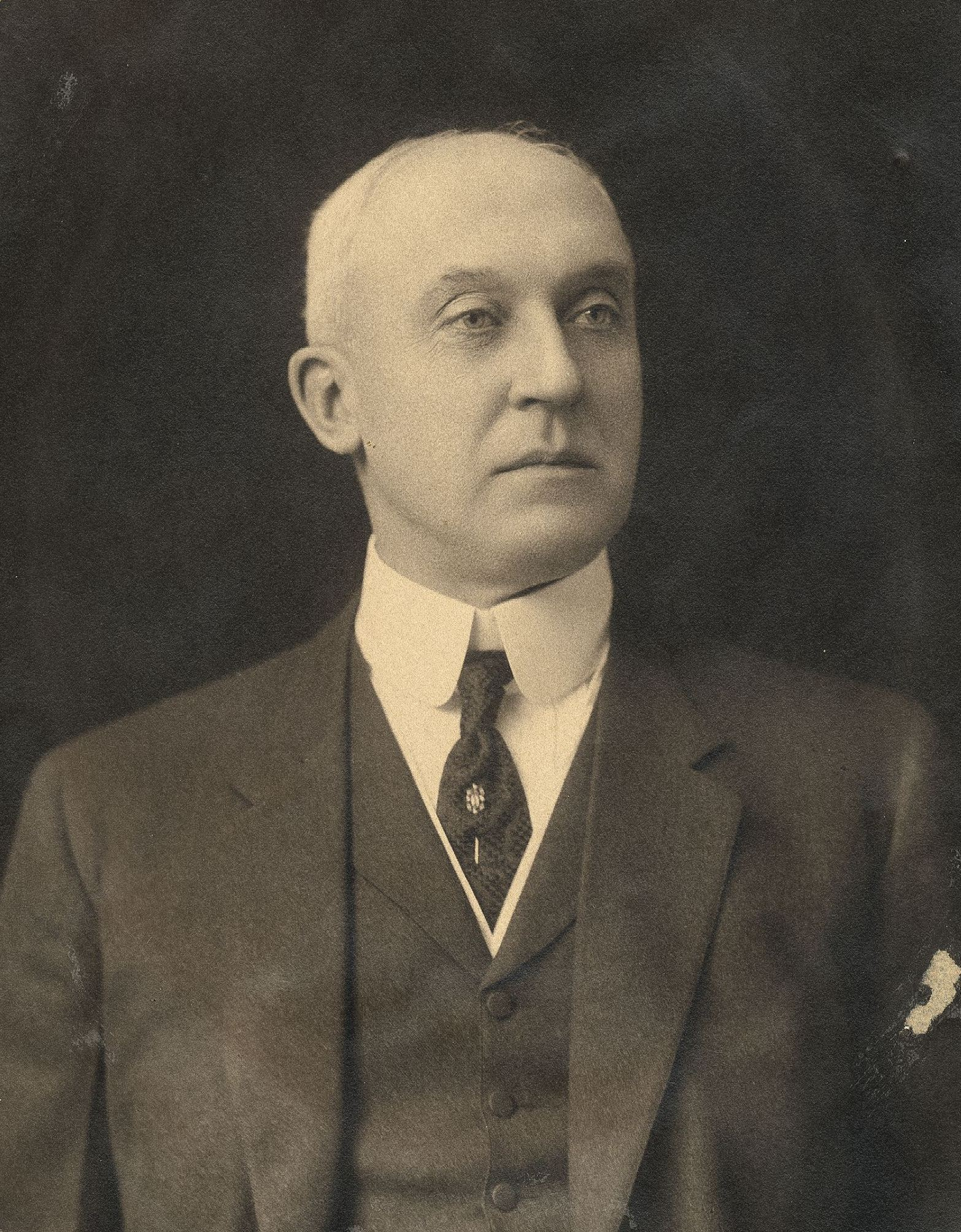

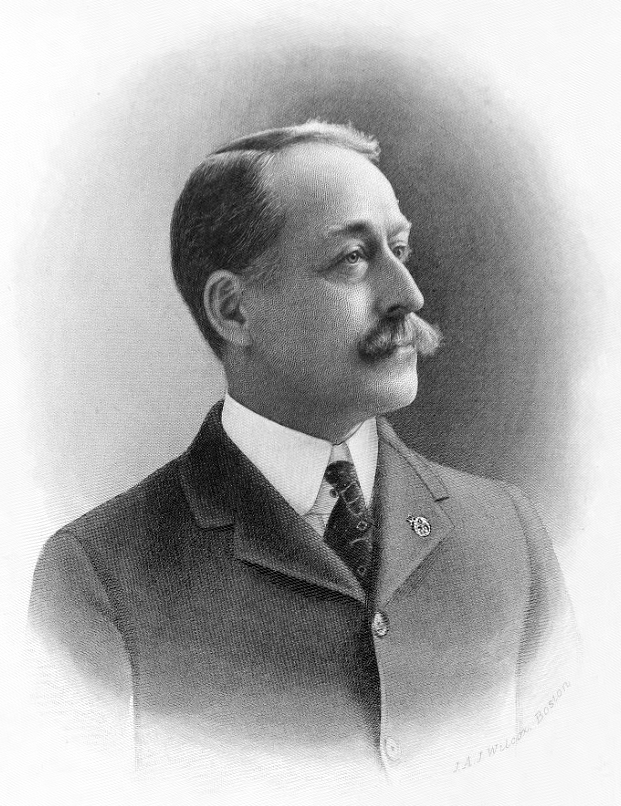
Nominee	William T. Cobb	Cyrus W. Davis
Party	Republican	Democratic
Popular vote	69,427	61,363
Percentage	52.01%	45.96%
- County results Cobb: 50–60% 60–70% Davis: 40–50% 50–60%
Governor before election
William T. Cobb
Republican
Elected Governor
William T. Cobb
Republican

The 1906 Maine gubernatorial election took place on September 10, 1906.

In a rematch of the 1904 gubernatorial election, incumbent Republican Governor William T. Cobb was re-elected to a second term in office, defeating Democratic candidate Cyrus W. Davis.

== Results ==
1906 Maine gubernatorial election (Note: The Maine Senate Journal records the result as Cobb 69,427, Davis 61,463, Fox 1,553, Woodward 1,132, scattering 27.)
Party	Candidate	Votes	%	±%
Republican	William T. Cobb (incumbent)	69,427	52.01%	
Democratic	Cyrus W. Davis	61,363	45.96%	
Socialist	Charles L. Fox	1,551	1.16%	
Prohibition	Henry Woodward	1,113	0.85%	
Scattering		26	0.02%	
Majority		8,064	6.05%	
Turnout		133,500	100.00%	
Republican hold		Swing		
