= 1906 California lieutenant gubernatorial election =

- November 6, 1906
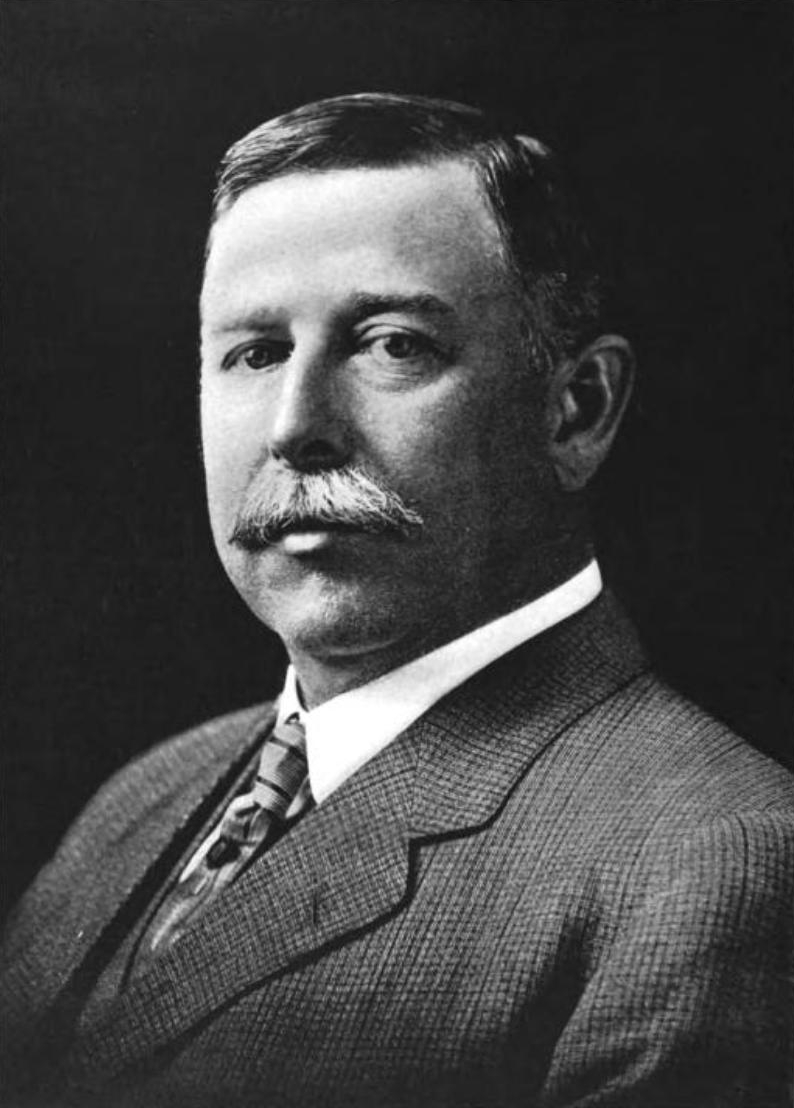

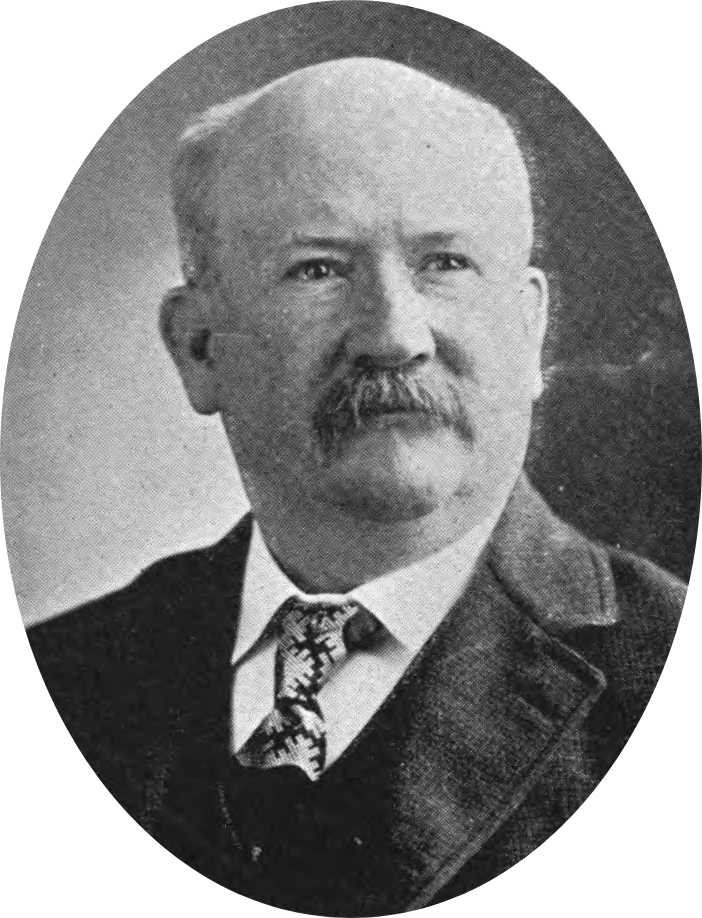
Nominee	Warren R. Porter	Thomas O. Toland
Party	Republican	Democratic
Popular vote	133,990	108,493
Percentage	44.38%	35.94%
Nominee	James H. Blagg	Frank I. Wheat
Party	Independence	Socialist
Popular vote	35,187	16,831
Percentage	11.66%	5.58%
- County results Porter: 40–50% 50–60% 70–80% Toland: 30–40% 40–50% 50–60% 60–70%
Lieutenant Governor before election
Alden Anderson
Republican
Elected Lieutenant Governor
Warren R. Porter
Republican

The 1906 California lieutenant gubernatorial election was held on November 6, 1906. Republican businessman Warren R. Porter defeated Democratic State Board of Equalization member Thomas O. Toland with 44.38% of the vote.

== General election ==
=== Candidates ===
- Warren R. Porter, Republican
- Thomas O. Toland, Democratic
- James H. Blagg, Independence
- Frank I. Wheat, Socialist
- C. N. Whitmore, Prohibition

=== Results ===
1906 California lieutenant gubernatorial election
Party	Candidate	Votes	%	±%
Republican	Warren R. Porter	133,990	44.38%	
Democratic	Thomas O. Toland	108,493	35.94%	
Independence	James H. Blagg	35,187	11.66%	
Socialist	Frank I. Wheat	16,831	5.58%	
Prohibition	C. N. Whitmore	7,395	2.45%	
Majority		301,896		
Turnout				
Republican hold		Swing		
