= 1906 Pennsylvania gubernatorial election =

- November 6, 1906
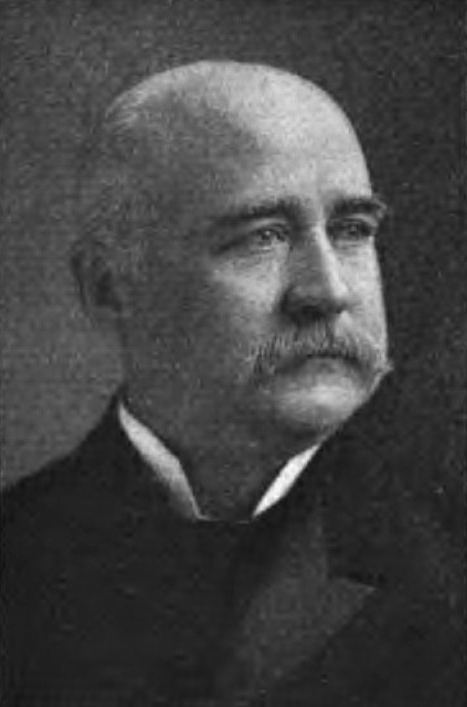

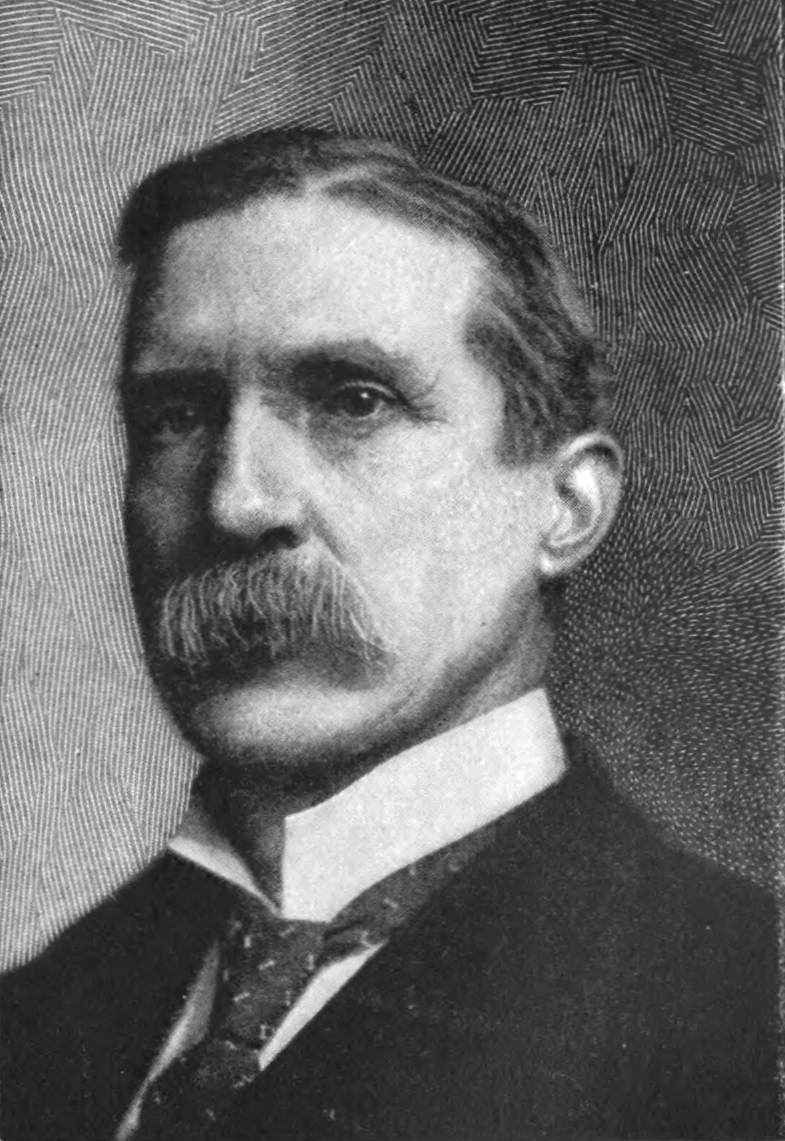
Nominee	Edwin Sydney Stuart	Lewis Emery, Jr.
Party	Republican	Democratic
Popular vote	506,418	458,054
Percentage	50.31%	45.51%
- County results Stuart: 40–50% 50–60% 60–70% Emery: 40–50% 50–60% 60–70% 70–80%
Governor before election
Samuel W. Pennypacker
Republican
Elected Governor
Edwin Sydney Stuart
Republican

The 1906 Pennsylvania gubernatorial election occurred on November 6, 1906. Incumbent Republican governor Samuel W. Pennypacker was not a candidate for re-election.

The Republican candidate, Edwin Sydney Stuart, defeated Democratic candidate Lewis Emery, Jr. to become Governor of Pennsylvania. Louis Arthur Watres, Charles Warren Stone, and William M. Brown unsuccessfully sought the Republican nomination, while Arthur Granville Dewalt unsuccessfully sought the Democratic nomination.

== Results ==
Pennsylvania gubernatorial election, 1906
Party	Candidate	Votes	%
Republican	Edwin Sydney Stuart	506,418	50.31
Democratic	Lewis Emery, Jr.	458,054	45.51
Prohibition	Homer L. Castle	24,793	2.46
Socialist	James H. Maurer	24,793	2.46
Socialist Labor	John Desmond	2,109	0.21
N/A	Others	36	0.00
Total votes		1,006,579	100.00
