= Robert Watt (miner) =

California State Controller
- In office 1869–1873

Robert Watt (March 1832 – July 11, 1907) was a California Gold Rush miner, California State Controller, and State Bank Commissioner.

== Early years ==
He was born in Edinburgh, Scotland, on March 10, 1832 the youngest of 11 children, his siblings including brothers George, James, John, David, Robert, and William; plus sisters Euphemia, Jane, Grace, and Janet. His parents were James and Janet (MacAlpin) Watt. Watt moved to California in 1852.

== Career ==
After Watt took a course in mining engineering in San Francisco, he became engaged in mining operations in Grass Valley, California, particularly the Massachusetts Hill and the Eureka Mine, along with brothers William and David. In 1869, he was elected California State Controller, an office he held for four years. In 1878, Watt became one of the three initial State Bank Commissioners, selected subsequent to the enactment of the California Bank Commission Act. In 1882, he was a candidate for Governor of California. He constructed the first cable-operated street-car line in San Francisco. Watt was officer or director of several institutions, including the Union Trust Company, the San Francisco Savings Union, the Wells Fargo Nevada Bank (merger of Wells Fargo with the Nevada Bank of San Francisco), and the Langley & Michaels Company.

== Personal life ==
He married Elizabeth Dewey Leighton in 1863, establishing their home in Grass Valley, California. They had five children, including Elizabeth, Janet, William, James and Frederick. He also had homes in Sacramento and San Rafael. He died of heart disease at his home in San Francisco. Watt was a member of the Bohemian, University, and Pacific Union clubs. He belonged to the Presbyterian Church and was a Scottish Rite Mason.
