= 1906 Georgia gubernatorial election =

- October 3, 1906
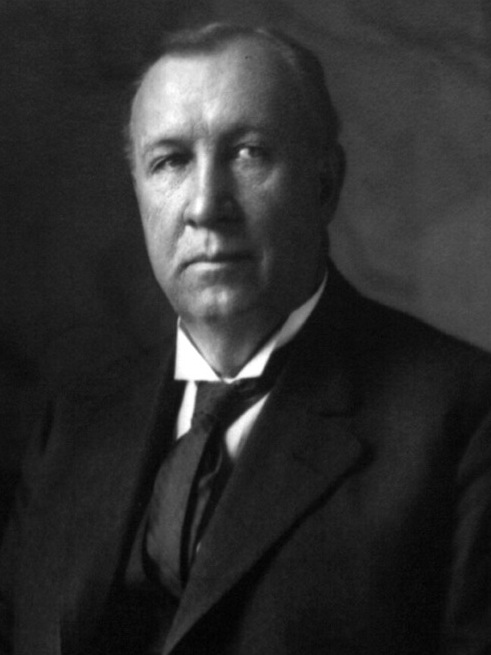

| Nominee | Hoke Smith | J. B. Osburn |
| Party | Democratic | Socialist |
| Popular vote | 76,962 | 148 |
| Percentage | 99.80% | 0.20% |
Governor before election
Joseph M. Terrell
Democratic
Elected Governor
Hoke Smith
Democratic

The 1906 Georgia gubernatorial election was held on October 3, 1906, in order to elect the Governor of Georgia. Democratic nominee and former United States Secretary of the Interior Hoke Smith defeated Socialist Party nominee J. B. Osburn in a landslide.

== Democratic primary ==
Smith defeated The Atlanta Constitution publisher Clark Howell in the Democratic gubernatorial primary on August 22, 1906. Going into the primary, Smith led Howell by a slim margin. Other candidates in the primary were:

- J. H. Estell, publisher of the Savannah Morning News
- Richard B. Russell
- James M. Smith, land owner and farmer
- G. A. Nunnally

== General election ==
On election day, October 3, 1906, Democratic nominee Hoke Smith won the election with a margin of 76,814 votes against his opponent Socialist Party nominee J. B. Osburn, thereby holding Democratic control over the office of Governor. Smith was sworn in as the 58th Governor of Georgia on June 29, 1907.

=== Results ===
Georgia gubernatorial election, 1906
| Party | Candidate | Votes | % |
|---|---|---|---|
| Democratic | Hoke Smith | 76,962 | 99.80 |
| Socialist | J. B. Osburn | 148 | 0.20 |
| Total votes | | 77,110 | 100.00 |
| Democratic hold | | | |
