= William T. Cobb =

American politician (1857–1937)

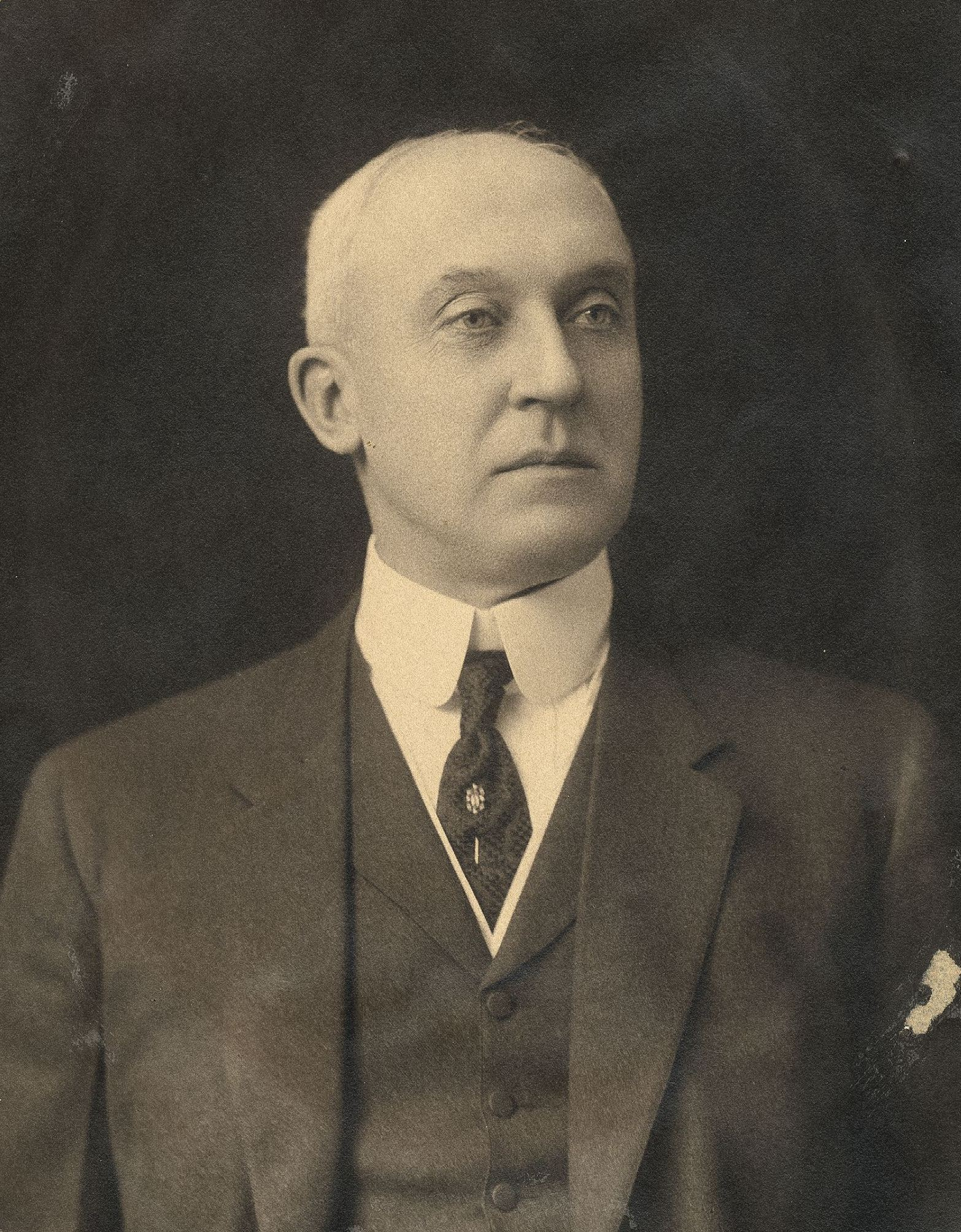

46th Governor of Maine
- In office January 4, 1905 – January 6, 1909
- Preceded by: John Fremont Hill
- Succeeded by: Bert M. Fernald

Personal details
- Born: William Titcomb Cobb; July 23, 1857 Rockland, Maine, U.S.
- Died: July 24, 1937 (aged 80) Rockland, Maine, U.S.
- Party: Republican
- Education: Bowdoin College; Harvard Law School
- Profession: Lawyer

William Titcomb Cobb (July 23, 1857 – July 24, 1937) was an American politician and the 46th governor of Maine.

== Biography ==
William Titcomb Cobb was born in Rockland, Maine, on July 23, 1857. He graduated in 1877 from Bowdoin College, where he was admitted to the Zeta Psi fraternity. After completing his graduation, he went to study in Germany. He studied at the Leipzig University and the University of Berlin. After his education in Germany, he returned to the United States and studied law at Harvard Law School. In 1880, he was admitted to the bar. He had a successful legal career.

He was nominated for the governorship of Maine by the Republican party in 1904. He won the general election. He was sworn into governor's office on January 4, 1905. He won the re-election in 1906. During his administration, harsher prohibition laws and economic restructuring was endorsed. Railroad growth was promoted. A meat inspection law and a pure food and drug law were advocated.

Cobb left office on January 6, 1909. He died on July 24, 1937, a day after his 80th birthday, in Rockland, Maine. He is buried in Achorn Cemetery, Rockland.

== Sources ==
- Sobel, Robert and John Raimo. Biographical Directory of the Governors of the United States, 1789-1978. Greenwood Press, 1988. ISBN 0-313-28093-2

Party political offices
Preceded by John Fremont Hill	Republican nominee for Governor of Maine; 1904, 1906	Succeeded by Bert M. Fernald
Political offices
Preceded by John F. Hill	Governor of Maine; 1905–1909	Succeeded by Bert M. Fernald
