= 1906 New Hampshire gubernatorial election =

- November 6, 1906
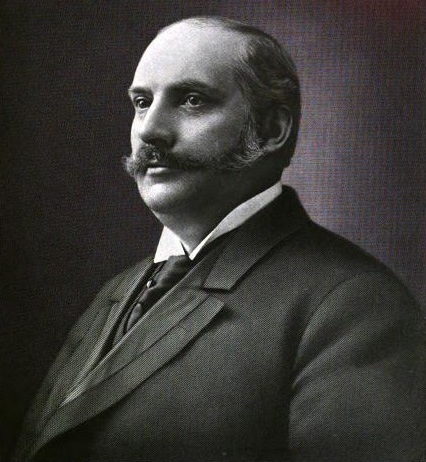

Nominee	Charles M. Floyd	Nathan C. Jameson
Party	Republican	Democratic
Popular vote	40,581	37,672
Percentage	49.79%	46.22%
- Floyd: 40-50% 50–60% 60–70% 70–80% 80–90% >90% Jameson: 40-50% 50–60% 60–70% 70–80% 80–90% >90% Tie: 40-50% 50%
Governor before election
John McLane
Republican
Elected Governor
Charles M. Floyd
Republican

The 1906 New Hampshire gubernatorial election was held on November 6, 1906. Republican nominee Charles M. Floyd defeated Democratic nominee Nathan C. Jameson with 49.79% of the vote.

== General election ==
=== Candidates ===
Major party candidates

- Charles M. Floyd, Republican
- Nathan C. Jameson, Democratic

Other candidates

- Edmund B. Tetley, Prohibition
- W.H. McFall, Socialist

=== Results ===
1906 New Hampshire gubernatorial election
Party	Candidate	Votes	%	±%
Republican	Charles M. Floyd	40,581	49.79%	
Democratic	Nathan C. Jameson	37,672	46.22%	
Prohibition	Edmund B. Tetley	2,212	2.71%	
Socialist	W.H. McFall	1,011	1.24%	
Majority		2,909		
Turnout				
Republican hold		Swing		
