= Lewis Emery Jr. =

American politician

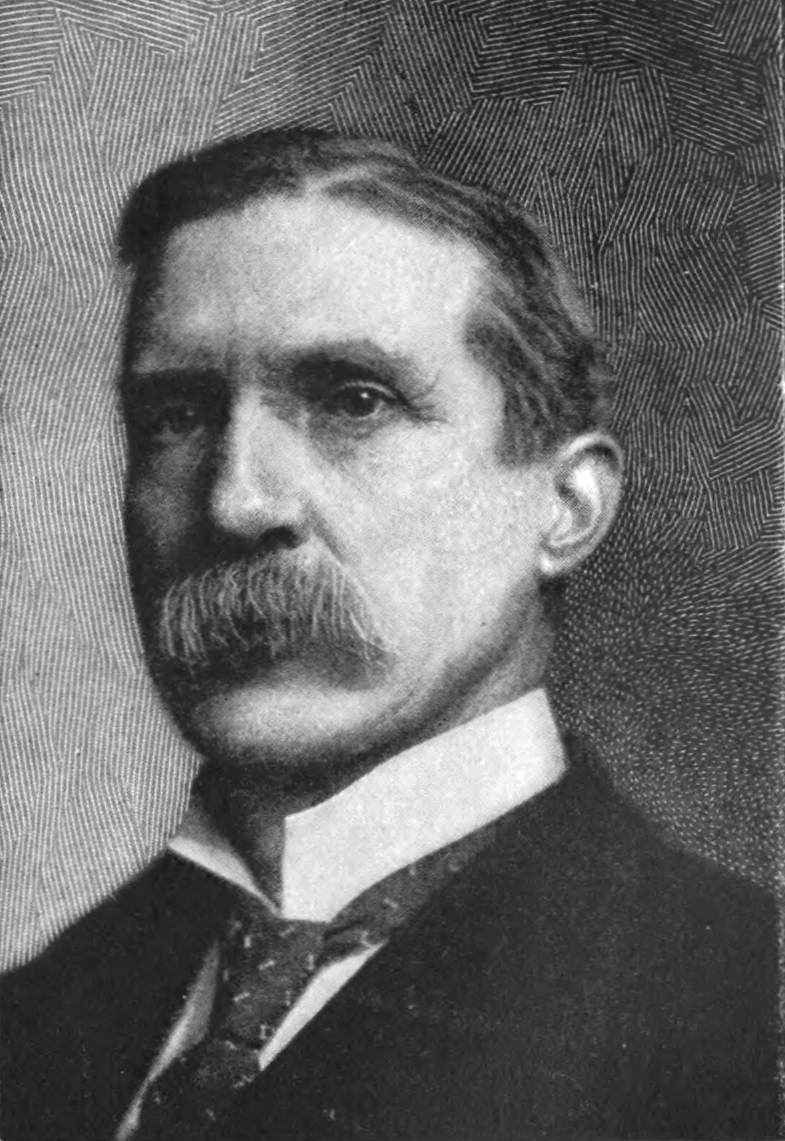
Lewis Emery, Jr.

Lewis Emery Jr. (1839–1924) was a New York-born businessman and politician who was active in the Commonwealth of Pennsylvania.

== Biography ==
Lewis Emery Jr. was the son of Lewis Sr. and Maria (Gilson) Emery; born at Cherry Creek Township, Chautauqua Co., New York, 10 August 1839. He moved with parents to Michigan; attended common schools; pursued a career as a miller; moved to Pennsylvania and engaged in the oil business in Titusville; moved again to Bradford, McKean County, 1875; member of the House of Representatives, 1879; state Senate, 1880–1888; became a wealthy oil man and industrialist, and 1906 Reform Republican candidate for Governor. He married at age 78, Eleta Card of New York City. He died in New York City, 19 November 1924; age 85. [Note: The Pennsylvania State Senate website biography incorrectly cites the death date as 8 November 1941.]

=== Burial ===
Emery is interred in the Emery mausoleum at Oak Hill Cemetery, Bradford, Pennsylvania. Services were held on 22 November 1924. Much of the business district shut down to honor the funeral procession.

=== Commemoration ===
Emery was the namesake for a World War II Liberty ship, the SS Lewis Emery Jr., launched in 1943.
