= Duncan Clinch Heyward =

American politician (1864–1943)

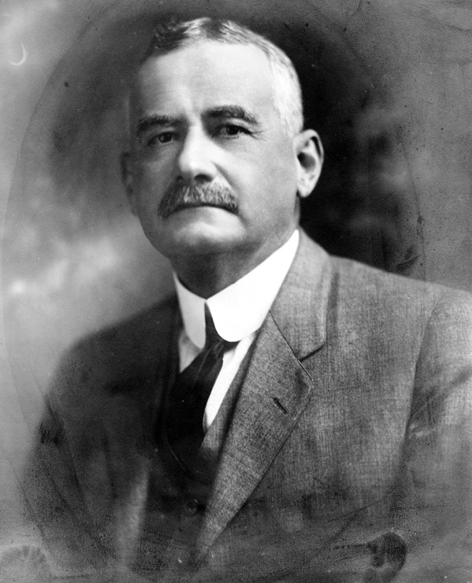

88th Governor of South Carolina
- In office January 20, 1903 – January 15, 1907
- Lieutenant: John T. Sloan
- Preceded by: Miles Benjamin McSweeney
- Succeeded by: Martin Frederick Ansel

Personal details
- Born: June 24, 1864 Richland County, South Carolina
- Died: January 23, 1943 (aged 78) Columbia, South Carolina, US
- Resting place: Elmwood Cemetery
- Party: Democratic
- Education: Washington and Lee University

Duncan Clinch Heyward (June 24, 1864 – January 23, 1943) was the 88th governor of South Carolina from January 20, 1903, to January 15, 1907.

== Family and early life ==
Heyward was born in Richland County to Edward Barnwell Heyward and Catherine Maria Clinch after his parents moved from Colleton County to avoid the Union Army during the Civil War. His parents moved back to Colleton County after the war, but Heyward lived with his grandmother when his parents died shortly thereafter. He attended the private schools of Charleston and went on to graduate from Washington and Lee University in Lexington, Virginia, in 1885. Residing in Walterboro, Heyward resumed the growing of rice on the part of the plantation he inherited from his parents. He became a member of the Knights of Pythias and served as a captain of a cavalry company in Colleton County.

== Political career ==
Announcing his candidacy in 1901 for the gubernatorial election of 1902, Heyward emerged as a frontrunner despite being a novice to politics. Ben Tillman did not have a favorite in the contest, but Heyward was an acceptable choice to him because Heyward favored the Dispensary. Heyward won in the runoff election against W. Jasper Talbert and became the 88th governor of South Carolina after running unopposed in the general election. He won a second term in 1904 and served as governor until his term expired in 1907.

While in office, Heyward spoke about the supremacy of the white race, and the right of the "white man" to settle every social and political question. Speaking at the Southern Conference on Quarantine and Immigration in 1906, Heyward argued for a vision of the Southern United States that subjugated Black Americans, by saying, "The white race is the predominant race and the Negro must understand once and for all that the bounds of the social and political questions will be determined by the white man alone and by the white man's code."

== Service as a tax collector ==
After leaving office, Heyward was appointed by President Woodrow Wilson in 1913 to be the Collector of Federal Internal Revenue Taxes for South Carolina.

== Works as a writer ==
Heyward wrote the book "Seed from Madagascar" in 1937. The book provides insight to the details of rice planting in the South Carolina lowcountry, and chronicles the decline of the rice planting industry and the prominent Heyward family.

== Death ==
Heyward died in Columbia, on January 23, 1943.

Party political offices
Preceded by Miles Benjamin McSweeney	Democratic nominee for Governor of South Carolina; 1902, 1904	Succeeded by Martin Frederick Ansel
Political offices
Preceded by Miles Benjamin McSweeney	Governor of South Carolina; 1903–1907	Succeeded by Martin Frederick Ansel
