= Martin Frederick Ansel =

American politician

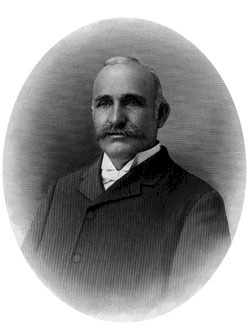

89th Governor of South Carolina
- In office January 15, 1907 – January 17, 1911
- Lieutenant: Thomas Gordon McLeod
- Preceded by: Duncan Clinch Heyward
- Succeeded by: Coleman Livingston Blease

Member of the South Carolina House of Representatives from Greenville County
- In office November 28, 1882 – November 27, 1888

Personal details
- Born: Martin Frederick Ansel; December 12, 1850 Charleston, South Carolina, US
- Died: August 23, 1945 (aged 94) Greenville, South Carolina, US
- Party: Democratic
- Spouse(s): Ophelia Anne Speights; Addie Hollingsworth Harris
- Children: 3
- Profession: Lawyer, politician

Martin Frederick Ansel (December 12, 1850 – August 23, 1945) was the 89th governor of South Carolina from 1907 to 1911. A member of the Democratic, Ansell was linked to its conservative wing.

== Early life ==
Born in Charleston, South Carolina, to John Ansel who was an immigrant from Württemberg in Germany and Fredrika Bowers, also a German immigrant, Martin grew up in the German "colony" of Walhalla, South Carolina. He was admitted to the bar in 1870, first practicing law in Franklin, North Carolina, for four years, then in Greenville, South Carolina, where he became involved in politics. He served in the state legislature between 1882 and 1888, then was elected solicitor in the eighth Judicial Circuit, where he stayed until 1901.

== Term as governor ==
He explored a run for governor in 1902, but did not actually run until 1906. He was re-elected in 1908. During his term, statewide prohibition was established.

== Marriages and children ==
He was first married to Ophelia Anne Speights, daughter of A.M. Speights, founder of The Greenville News, with whom he had two daughters and a son, but who died in 1894, then to Addie Hollingsworth Harris, who died in 1937. One of his daughters, Frederica, christened the battleship USS South Carolina (BB-26) in 1908.

== Death ==
He served as an elder at First Presbyterian church of Greenville. He was interred in Springwood Cemetery in Greenville.

Party political offices
Preceded by Duncan Clinch Heyward	Democratic nominee for Governor of South Carolina; 1906, 1908	Succeeded by Coleman Livingston Blease
Political offices
Preceded by Duncan Clinch Heyward	Governor of South Carolina; 1907–1911	Succeeded by Coleman L. Blease
