= Charles M. Floyd =

American politician

Charles Miller Floyd
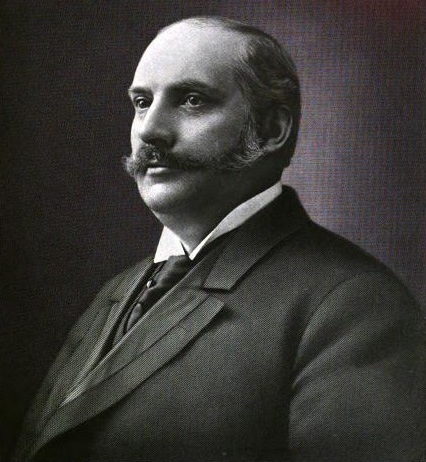

51st Governor of New Hampshire
- In office January 3, 1907 – January 7, 1909
- Preceded by: John McLane
- Succeeded by: Henry B. Quinby

Member of the New Hampshire Senate
- In office 1899–1901

Personal details
- Born: June 5, 1861 Derry, New Hampshire
- Died: February 3, 1923 (aged 61) Manchester, New Hampshire
- Party: Republican
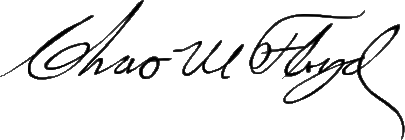
- Signature

Charles Miller Floyd (June 5, 1861 – February 3, 1923) was an American merchant, and manufacturer, and Republican politician from Manchester, New Hampshire who served as the 51st governor of New Hampshire from 1907 to 1909.

== Biography ==
Floyd was born in Derry, New Hampshire on June 5, 1861. He graduated from Pinkerton Academy and became a successful businessman, including ownership interests in retail clothing stores, farms, a shoe factory, a furniture making factory, a door and window blind factory, a construction company, banks and commercial real estate.

A Republican, Floyd served in the New Hampshire State Senate from 1899 to 1901. He was a member of the state Executive Council from 1905 to 1907.

In 1906 Floyd ran for Governor. He defeated popular novelist Winston Churchill for the Republican nomination, and finished first with a plurality in the general election. In a four-way race which included Socialist and Prohibition candidates, Floyd finished with slightly less than the majority required by the state constitution. The election then moved to the New Hampshire General Court, which chose Floyd.

Floyd's term included: attempts at ethics reform, including the elimination of free railroad passes for state legislators; creation of the state tax commission; and continued construction and improvement of state and local roads as automobiles became more prevalent.

After leaving office Floyd returned to his business interests. He was a Delegate to the 1912 Republican National Convention, was the state's World War I fuel administrator, and chaired the state tax commission from 1921 to 1923.

Floyd died in Manchester on February 3, 1923. He was buried at Pine Grove Cemetery in Manchester.

Derry's Charles M. Floyd Elementary School, which closed in 2006, was named for him.

Party political offices
Preceded by John McLane	Republican nominee for Governor of New Hampshire; 1906	Succeeded by Henry B. Quinby
Political offices
Preceded by John McLane	Governor of New Hampshire; 1907–1909	Succeeded by Henry B. Quinby
