= List of elections in 1902 =

The following elections occurred in the year 1902.

- 1902 Belgian general election
- 1902 Brazilian presidential election
- 1902 Costa Rican general election
- 1902 Danish Landsting election
- 1902 Danish local elections
- 1902 French legislative election
- 1902 Greek parliamentary election
- 1902 Honduran general election
- 1902 Liechtenstein general election
- 1902 Luxembourg general election
- 1902 Swedish general election
- 1902 Swiss federal election

== Europe ==
=== United Kingdom ===
- 1902 Belfast South by-election
- 1902 Bury by-election
- 1902 Cleveland by-election
- 1902 Clitheroe by-election
- 1902 Devonport by-election
- 1902 Dewsbury by-election
- 1902 East Down by-election
- 1902 East Worcestershire by-election
- 1902 Hampstead by-election
- 1902 Leeds North by-election
- 1902 Liverpool East Toxteth by-election
- 1902 North Kilkenny by-election
- 1902 Orkney and Shetland by-election
- 1902 Sheffield Ecclesall by-election
- 1902 Tiverton by-election
- 1902 Wakefield by-election

== North America ==
=== Canada ===
- 1902 Edmonton municipal election
- 1902 Northwest Territories general election
- 1902 Ontario general election
- 1902 Ontario prohibition referendum

=== United States ===
- 1902 New York state election
- 1902 United States elections

==== United States lieutenant gubernatorial ====
- 1902 Alabama lieutenant gubernatorial election
- 1902 California lieutenant gubernatorial election
- 1902 Connecticut lieutenant gubernatorial election
- 1902 Minnesota lieutenant gubernatorial election
- 1902 Nebraska lieutenant gubernatorial election
- 1902 Texas lieutenant gubernatorial election
- 1902 Wisconsin lieutenant gubernatorial election

==== United States gubernatorial ====
- 1902 Alabama gubernatorial election
- 1902 Arkansas gubernatorial election
- 1902 California gubernatorial election
- 1902 Colorado gubernatorial election
- 1902 Connecticut gubernatorial election
- 1902 Georgia gubernatorial election
- 1902 Idaho gubernatorial election
- 1902 Kansas gubernatorial election
- 1902 Maine gubernatorial election
- 1902 Massachusetts gubernatorial election
- 1902 Michigan gubernatorial election
- 1902 Minnesota gubernatorial election
- 1902 Nebraska gubernatorial election
- 1902 Nevada gubernatorial election
- 1902 New Hampshire gubernatorial election
- 1902 New York gubernatorial election
- 1902 North Dakota gubernatorial election
- 1902 Oregon gubernatorial election
- 1902 Pennsylvania gubernatorial election
- 1902 Rhode Island gubernatorial election
- 1902 South Carolina gubernatorial election
- 1902 South Dakota gubernatorial election
- 1902 Tennessee gubernatorial election
- 1902 Texas gubernatorial election
- 1902 United States gubernatorial elections
- 1902 Vermont gubernatorial election
- 1902 Wisconsin gubernatorial election
- 1902 Wyoming gubernatorial election

==== United States House of Representatives ====
- 1902 United States House of Representatives elections
- 1902 United States House of Representatives elections in California
- 1902 United States House of Representatives elections in South Carolina

==== United States Senate ====
- 1901–02 United States Senate elections
- 1902–03 United States Senate elections
- 1902 United States Senate election in Kentucky

==== United States mayoral elections ====
- 1902 Los Angeles mayoral election
- 1902 Manchester, New Hampshire, mayoral election
- 1902 Milwaukee mayoral election

== Oceania ==
=== Australia ===
- 1902 Balmain South state by-election
- 1902 Claremont state by-election
- 1902 Inverell state by-election
- 1902 South Australian state election
- 1902 Sydney-Pyrmont state by-election
- 1902 Tasmania by-election
- 1902 Victorian state election

=== New Zealand ===
- 1902 New Zealand general election

== See also ==
- Category:1902 elections
