= 1902 United States gubernatorial elections =

- November 4, 1902 (Note: Arkansas, Georgia, Maine, Oregon and Vermont held early elections.)

27 governorships
	Majority party	Minority party
Party	Republican	Democratic
Seats before	27 (Note: Henry McBride (R) succeeded Washington Governor John Rankin Rogers (D) who died in office in December 1901.)	17
Seats after	27	17
Seat change	Steady	Steady
Seats up	18	8
Seats won	18	8
	Third party
Party	Silver
Seats before	1
Seats after	1
Seat change	Steady
Seats up	1
Seats won	1
- Democratic gain Democratic hold Republican gain Republican hold Silver hold

United States gubernatorial elections were held in 1902, in 27 states, concurrent with the House and Senate elections, on November 4, 1902 (except in Arkansas, Georgia, Maine, Oregon and Vermont, which held early elections).

In Alabama, the governor was elected to a four-year term for the first time, instead of a two-year term. The election was held on the same day as federal elections for the first time, having previously been held in August.

== Results ==
State	Incumbent	Party	Status	Opposing candidates
Alabama	William D. Jelks	Democratic	Re-elected, 73.72%	John A. W. Smith (Republican) 26.28%
Arkansas (held, 1 September 1902)	Jefferson Davis	Democratic	Re-elected, 64.60%	Harry H. Myers (Republican) 24.43% Charles D. Greaves (Independent Republican) 6.97% George H. Kimball (Prohibition) 4.00%
California	Henry Gage	Republican	Lost re-nomination, Republican victory	George C. Pardee (Republican) 48.06% Franklin Knight Lane (Democratic) 47.22% Gideon S. Brower (Socialist) 3.15% Theodore D. Kanouse (Prohibition) 1.52% Scattering 0.04%
Colorado	James Bradley Orman	Democratic	Lost re-nomination, Republican victory	James H. Peabody (Republican) 46.92% E. C. Stimson (Democratic) 43.20% J. C. Provost (Socialist) 3.84% Frank W. Owens (People's) 3.43% Otto A. Reinhardt (Prohibition) 2.09% J. A. Knight (Socialist Labor) 0.52%
Connecticut	George P. McLean	Republican	Retired, Republican victory	Abiram Chamberlain (Republican) 53.44% Melbert B. Cary (Democratic) 43.41% Francis E. Wheeler (Socialist) 1.76% Robert N. Stanley (Prohibition) 0.90% Ernest Oatley (Socialist Labor) 0.50%
Georgia (held, 1 October 1902)	Allen D. Candler	Democratic	Term-limited, Democratic victory	Joseph M. Terrell (Democratic) 93.61% J. K. Hines (Populist) 6.39% (Democratic primary results) √ Joseph M. Terrell def. John H. Estill; Dupont Guerry [data missing]
Idaho	Frank W. Hunt	Democratic	Defeated, 43.18%	John T. Morrison (Republican) 52.90% August M. Slatey (Socialist) 2.60% Albert E. Gipson (Prohibition) 1.01% DeForest Andrews (People's) 0.31%
Kansas	William Eugene Stanley	Republican	Retired, Republican victory	Willis J. Bailey (Republican) 55.45% W. H. Craddock (Democratic) 40.79% F. W. Emerson (Prohibition) 2.11% A. S. McAllister (Socialist) 1.42% James H, Lathrop (Populist) 0.22%
Maine (held, 8 September 1902)	John Fremont Hill	Republican	Re-elected, 59.48%	Samuel W. Gould (Democratic) 34.68% James Perrigo (Prohibition) 4.03% Charles L. Fox (Socialist) 1.80% Scattering 0.01%
Massachusetts	Winthrop Murray Crane	Republican	[data missing]	John L. Bates (Republican) 49.23% William A. Gaston (Democratic) 39.92% John C. Chase (Socialist) 8.44% Michael T. Berry (Socialist Labor) 1.53% William H. Partridge (Prohibition) 0.89%
Michigan	Aaron T. Bliss	Republican	Re-elected, 52.52%	Lorenzo T. Durand (Democratic) 43.28% Walter S. Westerman (Prohibition) 2.82% William E. Walter (Socialist) 1.06% Shepard B. Cowles (Socialist Labor) 0.32%
Minnesota	Samuel Rinnah Van Sant	Republican	Re-elected, 57.53%	Leonard A. Rosing (Democratic) 36.68% Charles Scanlon (Prohibition) 2.13% Thomas J. Meighen (People's) 1.78% Thomas Van Lear (Socialist Labor) 0.95% Jay E. Nash (Socialist) 0.93%
Nebraska	Ezra P. Savage	Republican	Retired, Republican victory	John H. Mickey (Republican) 49.54% William H. Thompson (Democratic) (Note: Thompson ran under a fusion ticket between the Democrats and the Populist Party) 46.79% George Bigelow (Socialist) 1.93% Samuel T. Davies (Prohibition) 1.74%
Nevada	Reinhold Sadler	Silver	Retired, Silver victory	John Sparks (Silver-Democrat) 57.78% Abner Coburn Cleveland (Republican) 42.22%
New Hampshire	Chester B. Jordan	Republican	[data missing]	Nahum J. Bachelder (Republican) 53.19% Henry F. Hollis (Democratic) 42.75% John C. Berry (Prohibition) 2.05% Michael H. O'Neil (Socialist) 1.34% Alonzo Elliott (Independent) 0.59% George Howie (Allied People's) 0.07% Scattering 0.01%
New York	Benjamin Odell	Republican	Re-elected, 48.09%	Bird Sim Coler (Democratic) 47.45% Ben Hanford (Social Democrat) 1.69% Alfred L. Manierre (Prohibition) 1.48% Daniel De Leon (Socialist Labor) 1.15% Edgar L. Ryder (Liberal Democrat) 0.14%
North Dakota	Frank White	Republican	Re-elected, 62.68%	J. Cronan (Democratic) 34.85% Robert Grant (Independent) 2.47%
Oregon (held, 2 June 1902)	Theodore Thurston Geer	Republican	Lost re-nomination, Democratic victory	George Earle Chamberlain (Democratic) 46.17% William J. Furnish (Republican) 45.90% R. Ryan (Socialist) 4.09% A. J. Hunsaker (Prohibition) 3.84%
Pennsylvania	William A. Stone	Republican	Term-limited, Republican victory	Samuel W. Pennypacker (Republican) 54.20% Robert Emory Pattison (Democratic) 41.19% Silas C. Swallow (Prohibition) 2.13% John W. Slayton (Socialist) 2.00% William Adams (Socialist Labor) 0.47% Scattering 0.01%
Rhode Island	Charles D. Kimball	Republican	Defeated, 41.04%	Lucius F. C. Garvin (Democratic) 53.99% William E. Brightman (Prohibition) 2.83% Peter McDermott (Socialist Labor) 2.15%
South Carolina	Miles Benjamin McSweeney	Democratic	Term-limited, Democratic victory	Duncan Clinch Heyward (Democratic) 100.00% (Democratic primary run-off results); Duncan Clinch Heyward 55.58% William Jasper Talbert 44.42%
South Dakota	Charles N. Herreid	Republican	Re-elected, 64.72%	John W. Martin (Democratic) 28.73% John C. Crawford (Socialist) 3.53% H. H. Curtis (Prohibition) 3.02%
Tennessee	Benton McMillin	Democratic	Retired, Democratic victory	James B. Frazier (Democratic) 61.79% H. Campbell (Republican) 36.84% R. S. Cheves (Prohibition) 1.37%
Texas	Joseph D. Sayers	Democratic	Retired, Democratic victory	Samuel W. T. Lanham (Democratic) 74.92% George W. Burkett (Republican) 18.30% J. M. Mallett (Populist) 3.45% George W. Carroll (Prohibition) 2.43% Scattering 0.91%
Vermont (held, 2 September 1902)	William W. Stickney	Republican	Retired, Republican victory	John Griffith McCullough (Republican) 45.56% Percival Wood Clement (Local Option) 40.33% Felix W. McGettrick (Democratic) 10.53% Joel O. Sherbune (Prohibition) 3.57% Scattering 0.01% (General Assembly result) (Note: Since no candidate received 50% of the vote, the state legislature decided the election.) √ John Griffith McCullough (Republican) 164; Percival Wood Clement (Local Option) 59; Felix W. McGettrick (Democratic) 45
Wisconsin	Robert M. LaFollette	Republican	Re-elected, 52.89%	David Stuart Rose (Democratic) 39.88% Emil Seidel (Social Democrat) 4.37%
Wyoming	DeForest Richards	Republican	Re-elected, 57.81%	George T. Beck (Democratic) 39.99% Henry Breitenstein (Socialist) 2.20%

== See also ==
- 1902 United States elections
