= 1906 Texas lieutenant gubernatorial election =

- November 6, 1906
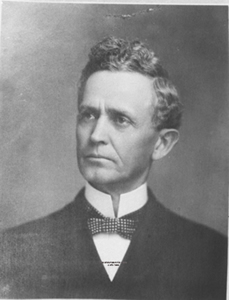

Nominee	Asbury Bascom Davidson	Frederick Hofheinz
Party	Democratic	Republican
Popular vote	148,264	24,193
Percentage	80.89%	13.20%
Lieutenant Governor before election
George D. Neal
Democratic
Elected Lieutenant Governor
Asbury Bascom Davidson
Democratic

The 1906 Texas lieutenant gubernatorial election was held on November 6, 1906, in order to elect the lieutenant governor of Texas. Democratic nominee and incumbent member of the Texas Senate Asbury Bascom Davidson defeated Republican nominee Frederick Hofheinz, Independent Republican nominee James C. Gibbons, Socialist nominee Lee L. Rhodes, Prohibition nominee Thomas Brown and Socialist Labor nominee Carl Schmidt.

== Democratic primary ==
This election marked the first time that the Democratic party held a primary election to select nominees for statewide office. This election was not a primary in the sense that the popular vote directly determined the nominee, instead the vote was used to allocate pledged delegates from each county at the state convention. During this period, Texas and other southern states were part of a voting bloc called the "Solid South" and due to the overwhelming success of Democratic party candidates, winning the primary election was tantamount to winning the general election.

=== Candidates ===
- Ashbury Bascom Davidson, state senator, lawyer, former district attorney
- Fitzhugh Francisco Hill, state representative and lawyer

== General election ==
On election day, November 6, 1906, Democratic nominee Asbury Bascom Davidson won the election by a margin of 124,071 votes against his foremost opponent Republican nominee Frederick Hofheinz, thereby retaining Democratic control over the office of lieutenant governor. Davidson was sworn in as the 22nd lieutenant governor of Texas on January 15, 1907.

=== Candidates ===
- Thomas Brown (Prohibition)
- Lee Lightfoot Rhodes, labor organizer, Socialist nominee for lieutenant governor in 1904, former Populist state representative, Social Democratic nominee for governor in 1900 (Socialist)
- Friedrich Hofheinz (Republican)
- James C. Gibbons (Black and Tan Republican)
- Carl Schmidt (Socialist Labor)

=== Results ===
Texas lieutenant gubernatorial election, 1906
Party	Candidate	Votes	%
Democratic	Asbury Bascom Davidson	148,264	80.89
Republican	Frederick Hofheinz	24,193	13.20
Independent Republican	James C. Gibbons	5,252	2.87
Socialist	Lee L. Rhodes	2,901	1.58
Prohibition	Thomas Brown	2,369	1.29
Socialist Labor	Carl Schmidt	319	0.17
Total votes		183,298	100.00
Democratic hold			
