= 1904 Texas lieutenant gubernatorial election =

- November 8, 1904
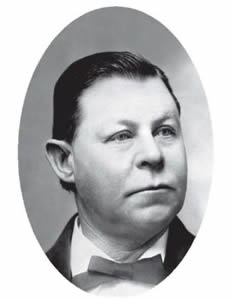

Nominee	George D. Neal	Sam Davidson
Party	Democratic	Republican
Popular vote	203,670	57,326
Percentage	72.49%	20.40%
Lieutenant Governor before election
George D. Neal
Democratic
Elected Lieutenant Governor
George D. Neal
Democratic

The 1904 Texas lieutenant gubernatorial election was held on November 8, 1904 in order to elect the lieutenant governor of Texas. Incumbent Democratic lieutenant governor George D. Neal defeated Republican nominee Sam Davidson, Populist nominee Clarence Nugent, Prohibition nominee J. W. Pearson and Socialist nominee Lee L. Rhodes.

== General election ==
On election day, November 8, 1904, incumbent Democratic lieutenant governor George D. Neal won re-election by a margin of 146,344 votes against his foremost opponent Republican nominee Sam Davidson, thereby retaining Democratic control over the office of lieutenant governor. Neal was sworn in for his second term on January 17, 1905.

=== Candidates ===
- George D. Neal, incumbent lieutenant governor (Democratic)
- Lee Lightfoot Rhodes, labor organizer, former Populist state representative, Social Democratic nominee for governor in 1900 (Socialist)
- Clarence Nugent, candidate for lieutenant governor in 1900 (Populist)
- Sam Davidson (Republican)
- J. W. Pearson (Prohibition)
- Charles Joseph Pollard (Socialist Labor)

=== Results ===
Texas lieutenant gubernatorial election, 1904
Party	Candidate	Votes	%
Democratic	George D. Neal (incumbent)	203,670	72.49
Republican	Sam Davidson	57,326	20.40
Populist	Clarence Nugent	9,620	3.42
Prohibition	J. W. Pearson	7,019	2.50
Socialist	Lee L. Rhodes	2,872	1.02
Write-in		447	0.17
Total votes		280,954	100.00
Democratic hold			
