= R. C. Bell (judge) =

American judge (1880–1962)

Reason Chesnutt Bell

Justice of the Supreme Court of Georgia
- In office 1932–1949
- Preceded by: James Kollock Hines
- Succeeded by: Bond Almand

Chief Justice of the Supreme Court of Georgia
- In office 1943–1946
- Preceded by: Charles Simpson Reid
- Succeeded by: William Franklin Jenkins

Personal details
- Born: January 28, 1880 Preston, Georgia, United States
- Died: February 19, 1962 (aged 82)
- Relatives: Vereen Bell (son)

Reason Chesnutt "R. C." Bell (January 28, 1880 – February 19, 1962) was a justice of the Supreme Court of Georgia from 1932 to 1949, including service as chief justice from 1943 to 1946.

== Early years and education ==
Born near Preston, in Webster County, Georgia, to Reason Alexander Bell and Martha Elliott Bell, he attended the public schools and received his J.D. from Mercer University in 1902.

== Law career ==
Bell entered the practice of law in Sylvester, Georgia in 1902, then moved to Cairo, Georgia in 1905. On January 1, 1913, he became solicitor general of the Albany Circuit, serving until his appointment to the Superior Court effective January 1, 1921. On January 24, 1922, he was appointed to the Georgia Court of Appeals, to which he was later elected and then re-elected, remaining until his appointment to the state supreme court by Governor Richard B. Russell.

== Legacy and death ==
Bell was the father of Vereen Bell, born in 1911, who authored the novel Swamp Water in 1941, which was made into a film that same year. Vereen Bell, a lieutenant in the United States Navy, was killed while serving aboard the USS Gambier Bay, an escort carrier, during the Battle off Samar, on 25 October 1944, during World War II.

Bell died in his home at the age of 82, following a long illness.

Political offices
Preceded by James K. Hines	Justice of the Supreme Court of Georgia; 1932–1949	Succeeded by Bond Almand
