= Governor Chamberlain =

Governor Chamberlain may refer to:

- Abiram Chamberlain (1837–1911), 60th Governor of Connecticut
- Daniel Henry Chamberlain (1835–1907), 76th Governor of South Carolina
- George Earle Chamberlain (1854–1928), 11th Governor of Oregon
- Joshua Chamberlain (1828–1914), 32nd Governor of Maine
