= Governor Atkinson =

Governor Atkinson may refer to:

- George W. Atkinson (1845–1925), 10th Governor of West Virginia
- William Yates Atkinson (1854–1899), 55th Governor of Georgia
