= 1900 Texas lieutenant gubernatorial election =

- November 6, 1900
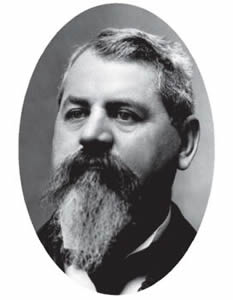

Nominee	James Browning	John B. Schmitz	Clarence Nugent
Party	Democratic	Republican	Populist
Popular vote	297,421	113,618	27,022
Percentage	66.56%	25.43%	6.05%
Lieutenant Governor before election
James Browning
Democratic
Elected Lieutenant Governor
James Browning
Democratic

The 1900 Texas lieutenant gubernatorial election was held on November 6, 1900 in order to elect the lieutenant governor of Texas. Incumbent Democratic lieutenant governor James Browning defeated Republican nominee John B. Schmitz, Populist nominee Clarence Nugent and Socialist Labor nominee Edmund Bellinger.

== Background ==
During this period Texas was a part of the Solid South and the Democratic Party was overwhelmingly favored in local and state elections. The main opposition party for the previous decade had been the Populist Party, but after the results of the 1896 election they had seen their popularity with voters diminish in the state. With the ongoing 1900 Presidential election the national Populist party was split on whether to repeat the strategy of electoral fusion with the Democrats or maintaining an independent organization. The Texas Populists were dominated by "middle of the roaders" who had opposed the national party's fusion with the Democrats in the previous election and continued to do so in the current one. The internal conflict further broke the party's organization as a majority of the State's executive committee broke from the "middle of the roaders" and supported fusion. At the nominating convention in July, the delegates nominated Clarence Nugent for lieutenant governor. Nugent was the son of Thomas Nugent who had been the Populist's nominee for governor in 1892 and 1894.

The Texas Republican Party also faced internal divisions, primarily over racial tensions. The "Black and Tan" faction which at the time was led by William M. McDonald had been in charge of the mainline Republican Party but a personal rivalry with Henry C. Ferguson led to there being two rival conventions being held, each claiming to be the legitimate organization. These simultaneous conventions each nominated their own slate of candidates for statewide office with the McDonald faction selecting G. G. Clifford and the Ferguson faction selecting John B. Schmitz to be their respective nominees for lieutenant governor. The state party under McDonald planned to expel all members of the rival faction from the party, but the Ferguson faction managed to get support from the National Republican Party which recognized the Ferguson faction and Schmitz as the legitimate ticket.

While the Democratic party convention was characterized as being "the most acrimonious and bitter fight in the history of the Democratic party" since the election of 1873, the fight was mostly contained to the details of the party platform and incumbent lieutenant governor James Browning was easily renominated.

There were several minor parties organizing in the state at the time, including the Prohibition Party which saw its largest convention since 1886.

== General election ==
On election day, November 6, 1900, incumbent Democratic lieutenant governor James Browning won re-election by a margin of 183,803 votes against his foremost opponent Republican nominee John B. Schmitz, thereby retaining Democratic control over the office. Browning was sworn in for his second term on January 15, 1901.

=== Candidates ===
- J. G. Adams (Prohibition)
- Edmund Bellinger, Socialist Labor Party candidate for lieutenant governor in 1898 (Socialist Labor)
- James N. Browning, incumbent lieutenant governor (Democratic)
- G. G. Clifford (Republican) (removed from ballot)
- John B. Schmitz, Republican nominee for Treasurer in 1890, Lily White candidate for Comptroller in 1892, lily white candidate for governor in 1894 (Republican)
- G. H. Shoaf (Social Democratic)
- Clarence Nugent (Populist)

=== Results ===
Texas lieutenant gubernatorial election, 1900
Party	Candidate	Votes	%
Democratic	James Browning (incumbent)	297,421	66.56
Republican	John B. Schmitz	113,618	25.43
Populist	Clarence Nugent	27,022	6.05
	Scattering	8,701	1.95
Socialist Labor	Edmund Bellinger	84	0.01
Total votes		446,846	100.00
Democratic hold			

== Aftermath ==
The election effectively marked the end of the Populist Party's period of being the major opposion to the Democratic Party in the state.

The internal division in the Republican Party between William McDonald and Henry Ferguson, both African Americans, weakened the Black and Tan faction and would lead to the "Lily White" faction of the party being able to take control. The Lily Whites embraced white supremacist policies and the party saw African American influence become greatly diminished for decades.
