= 1902 Texas lieutenant gubernatorial election =

- November 4, 1902
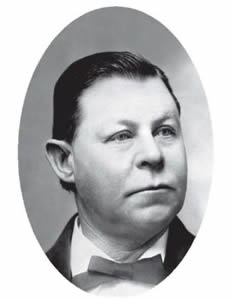
Nominee	George D. Neal
Party	Democratic
Popular vote	285,651
Percentage	91.58%
Lieutenant Governor before election
James Browning
Democratic
Elected Lieutenant Governor
George D. Neal
Democratic

The 1902 Texas lieutenant gubernatorial election was held on November 4, 1902 in order to elect the lieutenant governor of Texas. Democratic nominee state senator George D. Neal defeated several minor candidates by an overwhleming margin.

== General election ==
On election day, November 4, 1902, Democratic nominee George D. Neal won the election by a margin of 270,899 votes against his foremost opponent Populist nominee D. H. L. Bonner, thereby retaining Democratic control over the office of lieutenant governor. Neal was sworn in as the 21st lieutenant governor of Texas on January 20, 1903.

=== Candidates ===
- Dixon Henry Lewis "D. H. L." Bonner (Populist)
- George Douglas Neal, state senator and President pro tem of the Texas Senate, former city attorney of Navasota, former judge of Grimes County (Democratic)
- Word H. Mills (Socialist Labor)
- Arthur A. Everts (Prohibition)
- A. F. Martin (Socialist)

=== Results ===
Texas lieutenant gubernatorial election, 1902
Party	Candidate	Votes	%
Democratic	George D. Neal	285,651	91.58
Populist	D. H. L. Bonner	14,752	4.73
Prohibition	A. E. Everts	7,463	2.39
Write-in		4,041	1.30
Total votes		311,907	100.00
Democratic hold			
