= Asbury Bascom Davidson =

American politician (1855–1920)

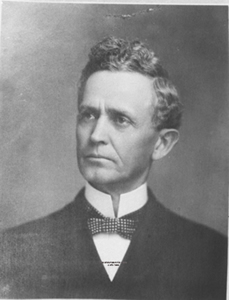

22nd Lieutenant Governor of Texas
- In office January 15, 1907 – January 21, 1913
- Governor: Thomas Mitchell Campbell; Oscar Branch Colquitt
- Preceded by: George D. Neal
- Succeeded by: William Harding Mayes

Member of the Texas Senate
- In office January 10, 1899 – January 3, 1903

Personal details
- Born: November 13, 1855 Lincoln County, Tennessee, US
- Died: February 4, 1920 (aged 64) Cuero, Texas, US
- Party: Democratic
- Occupation: Politician, lawyer

Asbury Bascom Davidson (November 13, 1855 – February 4, 1920) was an American politician. A Democrat, he was the Lieutenant Governor of Texas, under Governors Thomas Mitchell Campbell and Oscar Branch Colquitt.

== Biography ==
Davidson was born on November 13, 1855, in Lincoln County, Tennessee, the son of William Davidson and Cathrina (née McBank) Davidson. At around age six, he moved onto a farm near Georgetown, Texas. He attended Southwestern University then studied law in Gonzales, under James Francis Miller and William Branch Sayers.

After being admitted to the bar, Davidson practiced law in Gonzales, and in 1881, moved to Cuero. He was in the partnership Davidson, Schleicher, & Pleasants, alongside George J. Schleicher and Robert A. Pleasants. In the late 1880s and 1890s, he was district attorney of Texas' 24th Judicial District. The partnership ended in 1900, after which he partnered with John H. Bailey.

Davidson was a Democrat. From January 10, 1899, to January 3, 1903, he represented the 22nd district in the Texas Senate. He served as Lieutenant Governor for three terms, from January 15, 1907, to January 21, 1913, under Governors Thomas Mitchell Campbell and Oscar Branch Colquitt, becoming one of the longest-serving Lieutenant Governors in Texas history. Journalist Rick Casey described his tenure as Lieutenant Governor as uneventful. Politically, he supported competition law.

Davidson was a member of the Agricultural and Mechanical College of Texas Board of Directors, as well as a member of the Gulf Intracoastal Waterway executive committee. In March 1890, he married Minnie McClanahan. He was a member of the Knights Templar and the Freemasons. He died on February 4, 1920, aged 64, in Cuero. He was interred at Hillside Cemetery, in Cuero.

Political offices
Preceded by George D. Neal	Lieutenant Governor of Texas; 1907–1913	Succeeded by William Harding Mayes
