= 1904 Connecticut gubernatorial election =

- November 8, 1904
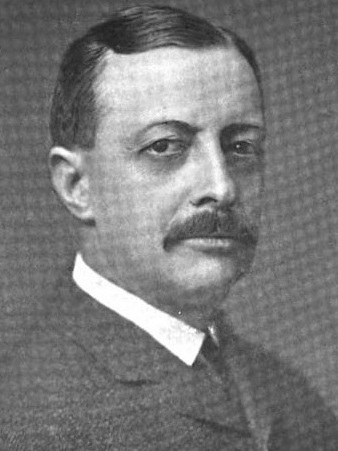

Nominee	Henry Roberts	A. Heaton Robertson
Party	Republican	Democratic
Popular vote	104,736	79,164
Percentage	54.88%	41.48%
- Roberts: 40–50% 50–60% 60–70% 70–80% 80–90% Robertson: 50–60% 60–70%
Governor before election
Abiram Chamberlain
Republican
Elected Governor
Henry Roberts
Republican

The 1904 Connecticut gubernatorial election was held on November 8, 1904. Republican nominee Henry Roberts defeated Democratic nominee A. Heaton Robertson with 54.88% of the vote.

== General election ==
=== Candidates ===
Major party candidates

- Henry Roberts, Republican
- A. Heaton Robertson, Democratic

Other candidates

- George A. Sweetland, Socialist
- Oliver G. Beard, Prohibition
- Timothy Sullivan, Socialist Labor
- Joseph Sheldon, People's

=== Results ===
1904 Connecticut gubernatorial election
Party	Candidate	Votes	%	±%
Republican	Henry Roberts	104,736	54.88%	
Democratic	A. Heaton Robertson	79,164	41.48%	
Socialist	George A. Sweetland	4,390	2.30%	
Prohibition	Oliver G. Beard	1,498	0.79%	
Socialist Labor	Timothy Sullivan	562	0.30%	
Populist	Joseph Sheldon	481	0.25%	
Majority		25,572		
Turnout				
Republican hold		Swing		
