= 1906 Connecticut gubernatorial election =

- November 6, 1906
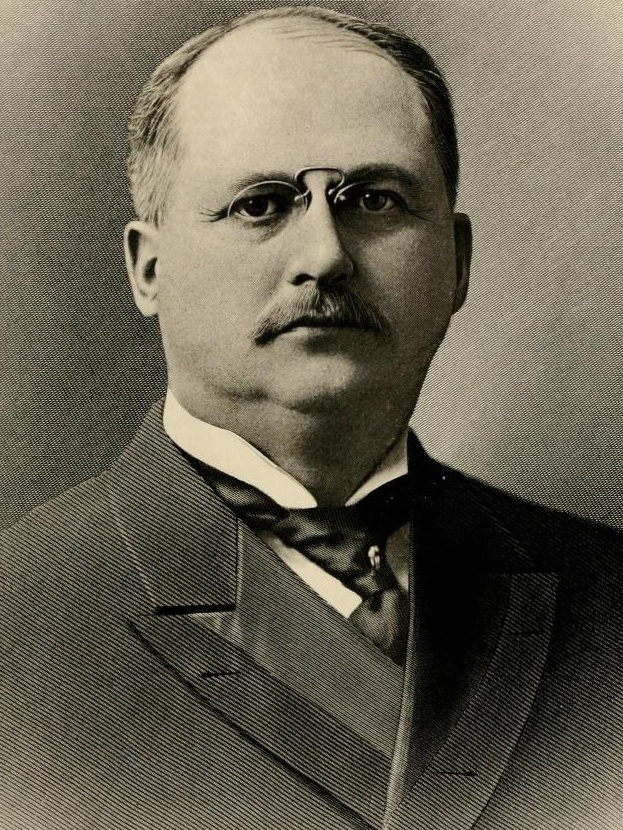

Nominee	Rollin S. Woodruff	Charles Frederick Thayer
Party	Republican	Democratic
Popular vote	88,384	67,776
Percentage	54.83%	42.05%
- Woodruff: 40–50% 50–60% 60–70% 70–80% 80–90% Thayer: 40–50% 50–60% 60–70%
Governor before election
Henry Roberts
Republican
Elected Governor
Rollin S. Woodruff
Republican

The 1906 Connecticut gubernatorial election was held on November 6, 1906. Republican nominee Rollin S. Woodruff defeated Democratic nominee Charles Frederick Thayer with 54.83% of the vote.

== General election ==
=== Candidates ===
Major party candidates

- Rollin S. Woodruff, Republican
- Charles Frederick Thayer, Democratic

Other candidates

- Ernest D. Hull, Socialist
- Matthew E. O'Brien, Prohibition
- Charles F. Roberts, Socialaist Labor

=== Results ===
1906 Connecticut gubernatorial election
Party	Candidate	Votes	%	±%
Republican	Rollin S. Woodruff	88,384	54.83%	
Democratic	Charles Frederick Thayer	67,776	42.05%	
Socialist	Ernest D. Hull	2,932	1.82%	
Prohibition	Matthew E. O'Brien	1,820	1.13%	
Socialist Labor	Charles F. Roberts	281	0.17%	
Majority		20,608		
Turnout				
Republican hold		Swing		
