= 1904 Texas gubernatorial election =

- November 8, 1904
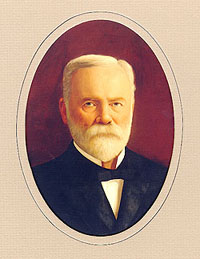

Candidate	S. W. T. Lanham	J. G. Lowden
Party	Democratic	Republican
Popular vote	206,167	56,865
Percentage	73.57%	20.29%
- County results Lanham: 50–60% 60–70% 70–80% 80–90% 90–100% Lowden: 50–60% 60–70% 70–80% 80–90% No Data/Vote
Governor before election
S. W. T. Lanham
Democratic
Governor-elect
S. W. T. Lanham
Democratic

The 1904 Texas gubernatorial election was held to elect the Governor of Texas. Incumbent Governor S. W. T. Lanham was re-elected to a second term over Republican J. G. Lowden.

== General election ==
=== Candidates ===
- Pat B. Clark (Populist)
- W. D. Jackson (Prohibition)
- Frank Leitner (Socialist Labor)
- S. W. T. Lanham, incumbent Governor (Democratic)
- J. G. Lowden (Republican)
- Word H. Mills (Socialist)

=== Results ===
1904 Texas gubernatorial election
Party	Candidate	Votes	%	±%
Democratic	S. W. T. Lanham (incumbent)	206,167	73.57%	▼1.35
Republican	J. G. Lowden	56,865	20.29%	▲2.00
Populist	Pat B. Clark	9,301	3.32%	▼0.13
Prohibition	W. D. Jackson	4,509	1.61%	▼0.81
Socialist	Word H. Mills	2,847	1.02%	N/A
Socialist Labor	Frank Leitner	552	0.20%	N/A
Total votes		280,241	100.00%	
