= Susan Cobb Milton Atkinson =

American educator (1860–1942)

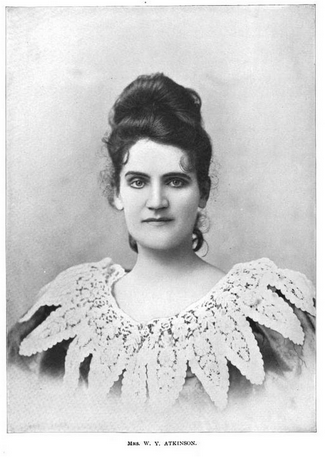
- Susan Milton Atkinson, in an 1896 publication.

First Lady of Georgia
- In role October 27, 1894 – October 29, 1898
- Governor: William Yates Atkinson
- Preceded by: Martha Northen
- Succeeded by: Eugenia Candler

Personal details
- Born: Susan Cobb Milton; 1860 Greenwood, Florida, U.S.
- Died: 1942 (aged 81–82)
- Spouse: William Yates Atkinson (m. 1880; died 1899)
- Children: 6
- Relatives: John Milton (grandfather)
- Education: Lucy Cobb Institute
- Occupation: Educator

Susan Cobb Milton Atkinson (1860 — 1942) was an American educator who was influential in promoting education to women in Georgia in the late 19th and early 20th centuries. As the wife of William Yates Atkinson, the Governor of Georgia from 1894 to 1898, she used her position as the state First Lady to advocate for state funding for women to attend college. After her time at Georgia College, she went into the insurance business. In her later life, Atkinson served as the postmistress in Newnan—a title bestowed upon her by President Theodore Roosevelt himself.

== Early life and education ==
Susan was born in Greenwood, Florida. She was the granddaughter of Florida governor John Milton, so Susan was exposed at a young age to the life of politics.

She attended the Lucy Cobb Institute for college, where she also met her husband.

== Georgia College and State University ==
Susan Atkinson was encouraged by one of her friends, Julia Flisch, to help open another college for women in Georgia. In 1889, Atkinson created a petition for the state of Georgia to open a college, so her husband presented a bill to the House of Representatives that finally passed. After Milledgeville was selected as the site for the college, it was founded in 1890 as Georgia Normal and Industrial College. The school's name was later changed to Georgia State College for Women and then finally to Georgia College & State University. When the college was founded, William was named Chairman of the Board of Trustees, and Susan became the President of the Board of Visitors.

== Personal life and legacy ==
Susan Cobb Milton married William Yates Atkinson in 1880. She was widowed when William died in 1899. The Atkinsons had six children together. One of their sons, William Yates Atkinson Jr., became a justice of the Georgia Supreme Court. Georgia Normal and Industrial College honored the Atkinsons by naming a building in their honor. Atkinson Hall is now the building for the School of Business at Georgia College.
