= Reinhard Hillebrand =

Member of the Texas Senate from the 26th district
- In office January 17, 1871 – January 14, 1873
- Preceded by: E.L. Alford
- Succeeded by: Joseph D. Sayers

County Judge of Fayette County
- In office 1869–1870

Personal details
- Born: Reinhard Hillebrandt (Note: It's possible that he changed his name from Hillebrandt to Hillebrand to make his name appear less German when he immigrated to the United States.); March 10, 1810 Germany
- Died: September 13, 1887 (aged 77) Fayette County, Texas, U.S.
- Party: Republican
- Other political affiliations: Radical Republican
- Spouse: Widowed
- Children: 2 sons (Note: Sources are unclear on whether or not Hillebrand had additional children.)
- Occupation: Farmer

Reinhard Hillebrand (March 10, 1810 – September 13, 1887) was a German American politician and soldier who served in the Texas Senate for District 26. He was a Radical Republican.

== Early life and military background ==
Reinhard Hillebrand was born on March 10, 1810, in Germany. While living in Germany, Hillebrand participated in the 1848 revolutions. In the 1850s, he immigrated to the United States, settling in Fayette County, Texas. During the Civil War, Hillebrand organized the Rutersville German Company, which was a company of volunteer infantry soldiers. Such companies had been supported by the Texas legislature during the time. Despite organizing troops, in 1863, Hillebrand was involved in anti-conscription efforts that led to his arrest and imprisonment for treason by the Confederate military.

== Political career ==
Hillebrand was elected to be county judge of Fayette County in 1869; he served for one year before leaving to run for the Texas Senate after E. L. Alford had been banished from the Texas Senate and the Republican Party. Hillebrand won his seat in a special election to represent Texas Senate, District 26. He was a Radical Republican who opposed business subsidies and was scandalously associated with black voters.

== Later life and death ==
The 1880 United States census labeled Hillebrand as a widowed farmer who lived in Fayette County. Hillebrand died on September 13, 1887 after being thrown from his horse-drawn buggy in Fayette County; the La Grange Journal reported he succumbed to his injuries roughly 24-hours after the accident while The Dallas Morning News reported his death to be instant. Hillebrand had already left his will to his two sons; he was buried at Hillebrand Family Cemetery located near Park, Texas.
