= 1902 Georgia gubernatorial election =

- October 1, 1902
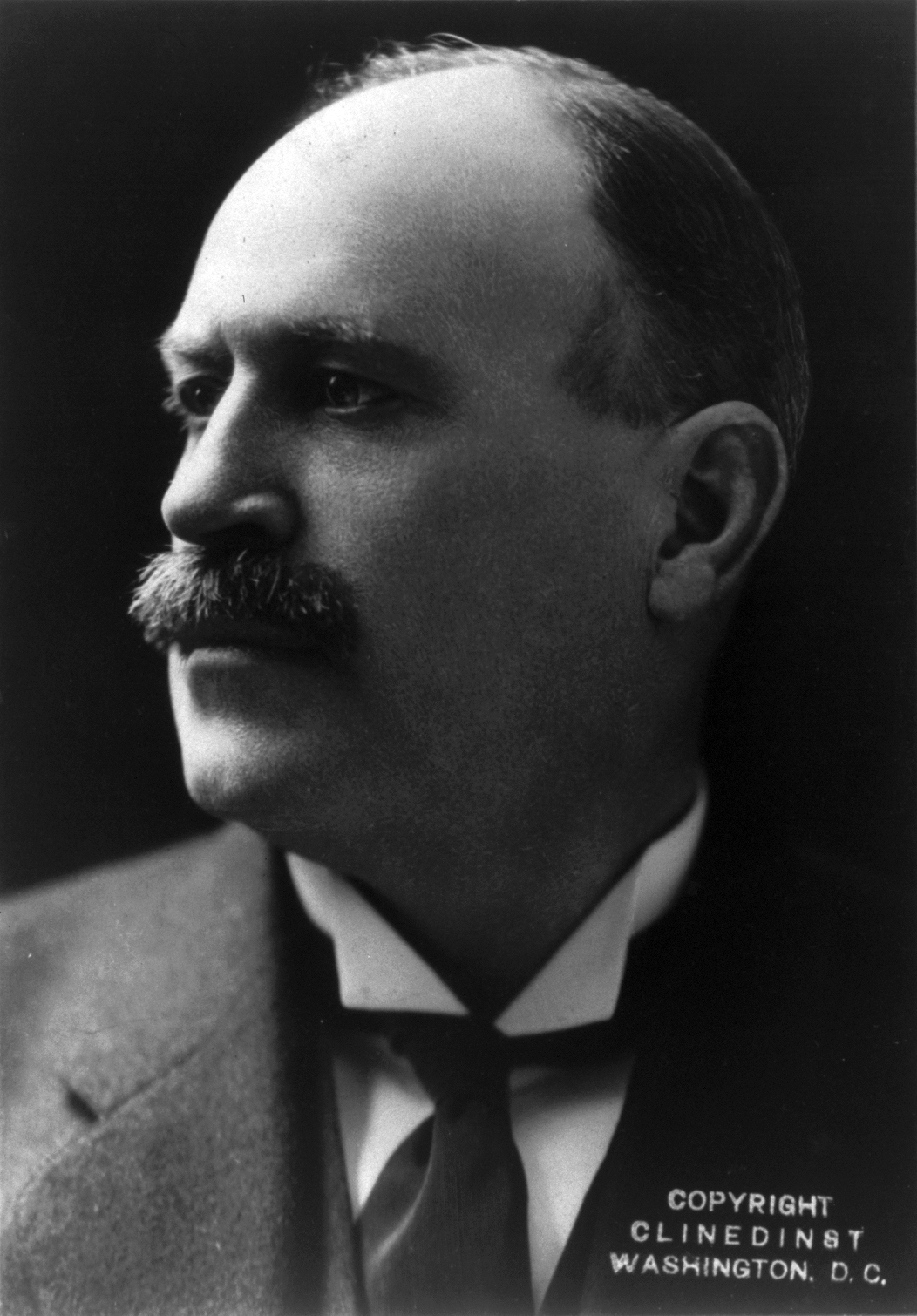

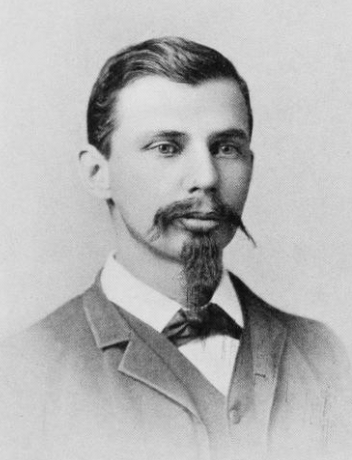
Nominee	Joseph M. Terrell	J. K. Hines
Party	Democratic	Populist
Popular vote	81,548	5,566
Percentage	93.61%	6.39%
- County results Terrell: 50–60% 60–70% 70–80% 80–90% >90%
Governor before election
Allen D. Candler
Democratic
Elected Governor
Joseph M. Terrell
Democratic

The 1902 Georgia gubernatorial election was held on October 1, 1902, in order to elect the Governor of Georgia. Democratic nominee and incumbent Attorney General of Georgia Joseph M. Terrell defeated People's Party nominee and candidate in the 1894 election J. K. Hines in a landslide.

== Democratic primary ==
Terrell defeated candidates John H. Estill and Dupont Guerry in the Democratic primary.

== General election ==
On election day, October 1, 1902, Democratic nominee Joseph M. Terrell won the election with a margin of 75,982 votes against his opponent People's Party nominee J. K. Hines, thereby holding Democratic control over the office of Governor. Terrell was sworn in as the 57th Governor of Georgia on October 25, 1902.

=== Results ===
Georgia gubernatorial election, 1902
Party	Candidate	Votes	%
Democratic	Joseph M. Terrell	81,548	93.61
Populist	J. K. Hines	5,566	6.39
Total votes		87,114	100.00
Democratic hold			
