= 1894 Georgia gubernatorial election =

- October 3, 1894
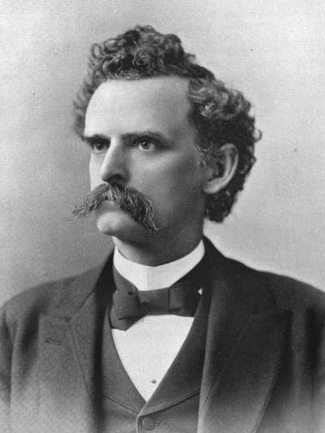

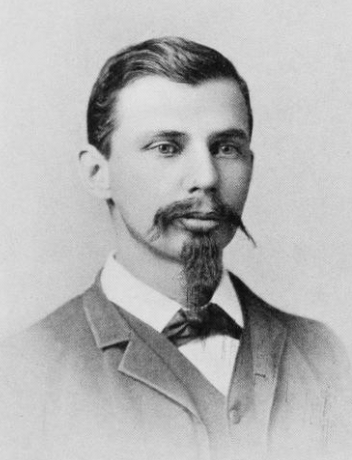
Nominee	William Yates Atkinson	J. K. Hines
Party	Democratic	Populist
Popular vote	121,249	96,990
Percentage	55.56%	44.44%
- County results Atkinson: 50–60% 60–70% 70–80% 80–90% >90% Hines: 50–60% 60–70% 70–80%
Governor before election
William J. Northen
Democratic
Elected Governor
William Yates Atkinson
Democratic

The 1894 Georgia gubernatorial election was held on October 3, 1894, in order to elect the Governor of Georgia. Democratic nominee and former Speaker of the Georgia House of Representatives William Yates Atkinson defeated People's Party nominee J. K. Hines.

== General election ==
On election day, October 3, 1894, Democratic nominee William Yates Atkinson won the election with a margin of 24,259 votes against his opponent People's Party nominee J. K. Hines, thereby holding Democratic control over the office of Governor. Atkinson was sworn in as the 55th Governor of Georgia on October 27, 1894.

=== Results ===
Georgia gubernatorial election, 1894
Party	Candidate	Votes	%
Democratic	William Yates Atkinson	121,249	55.56
Populist	J. K. Hines	96,990	44.44
Total votes		218,239	100.00
Democratic hold			
