= 1902 Connecticut lieutenant gubernatorial election =

- November 4, 1902
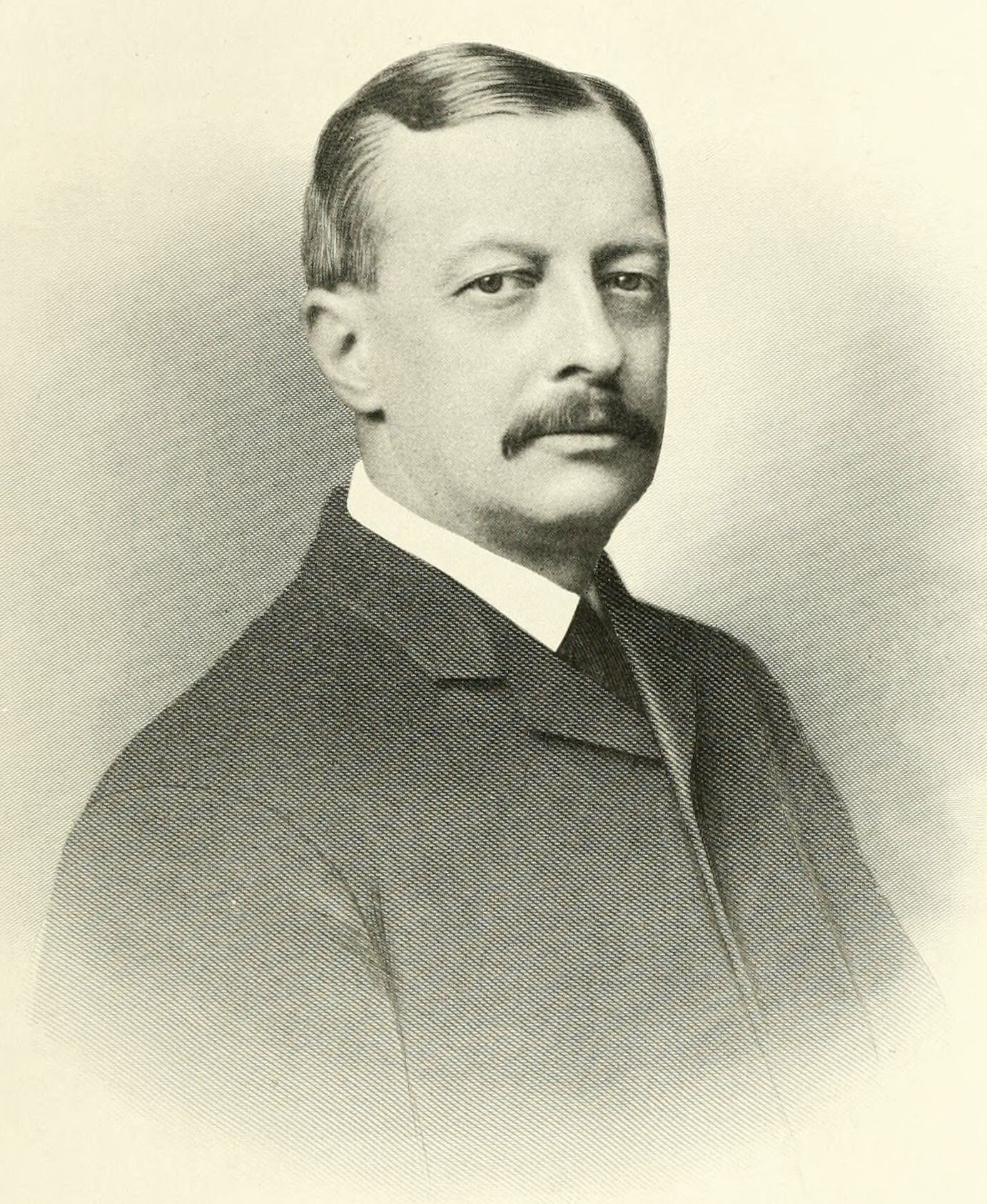

Nominee	Henry Roberts	E. Kent Hubbard
Party	Republican	Democratic
Popular vote	84,449	70,013
Percentage	54.70%	45.30%
Lieutenant Governor before election
Edwin O. Keeler
Republican
Elected Lieutenant Governor
Henry Roberts
Republican

The 1902 Connecticut lieutenant gubernatorial election was held on November 4, 1902, to elect the lieutenant governor of Connecticut. Republican nominee and incumbent member of the Connecticut Senate Henry Roberts won the election against Democratic nominee E. Kent Hubbard.

== General election ==
On election day, November 4, 1902, Republican nominee Henry Roberts won the election with 54.70% of the vote, thereby retaining Republican control over the office of lieutenant governor. Roberts was sworn in as the 70th lieutenant governor of Connecticut on January 7, 1903.

=== Results ===
Connecticut lieutenant gubernatorial election, 1902
Party	Candidate	Votes	%
Republican	Henry Roberts	84,449	54.70
Democratic	E. Kent Hubbard	70,013	45.30
Total votes		154,462	100.00
Republican hold			
