= Charles S. Reid =

American judge (1897–1947)

Charles Simpson Reid

Chief Justice of the Supreme Court of Georgia
- In office 1938–1943
- Preceded by: Richard Russell Sr.
- Succeeded by: Robert Charles Bell

Personal details
- Born: September 25, 1897 Blairsville, Georgia, United States
- Died: November 7, 1947 (aged 50)
- Cause of death: Suicide
- Education: Young Harris College
- Alma mater: Atlanta Law School
- Military career
- Allegiance: United States
- Branch: United States Army
- Conflicts: World War II

Charles Simpson Reid (September 25, 1897 – November 7, 1947) was chief justice of the Supreme Court of Georgia from 1938 to 1943.

Born in Blairsville, Georgia, Reid attended Young Harris College and graduated from Atlanta Law School in 1918. After working his way up from being a bank teller to bank vice president, he joined with partners to form the law firm of Little Powell and Reid, and became Georgia Democratic executive committee chairman. In 1938, Governor Eurith D. Rivers appointed Reid chief justice of the state supreme court, making the 41-year-old the youngest chief justice in the United States at the time.

Reid married Agnes Baker, widow of Dr. Elliott L. Baker, shortly before joining the military. Reid resigned from the court to join the United States Army during World War II, where he was on the staff of General Dwight D. Eisenhower as chief of the property control division. Following the war, he served as a Colonel on the staff of Lucius D. Clay, who was the military governor of American-occupied Germany. After returning to Georgia, Reid was given charge of the estate of Ella Griffith for the benefit of Georgia Baptist Children's Home. When $28,000 under his supervision went missing and an inquiry was scheduled, he committed suicide by jumping from a twelfth-story window.

Political offices
| Preceded by Richard Russell Sr. | Chief Justice of the Supreme Court of Georgia; 1938–1943 | Succeeded by Robert Charles Bell |
