= Melbert B. Cary =

American politician (1852–1946)

Chairman of the Democratic Party of Connecticut
- In office June, 1896 – 1900

Personal details
- Born: Melbert Brinckerhoff Cary; July 23, 1852 Racine, Wisconsin
- Died: March 17, 1946 (aged 93)

Melbert Brinckerhoff Cary (July 23, 1852 – March 17, 1946) was Chairman of the Democratic Party of Connecticut.

Cary was born on July 23, 1852, in Racine, Wisconsin. He was the son of the Wisconsin politician John W. Cary. In 1880, he married Julia Metcalf. Cary's son, Melbert Jr., became a noted graphic artist.

Cary was Chairman of the Democratic Party of Connecticut from 1898 to 1900. In 1902, he was a candidate for Governor of Connecticut, losing to Abiram Chamberlain. He was also a delegate to the 1908 Democratic National Convention.

Party political offices
Preceded by S. L. Bronson	Democratic nominee for Governor of Connecticut; 1902	Succeeded by A. Heaton Richardson
