= Lure of the Wilderness =

1952 film by Jean Negulesco

- Theatrical poster
- Directed by: Jean Negulesco
- Story by: Louis Lantz
- Based on: 1941 novel Swamp Water by Vereen Bell
- Produced by: Robert L. Jacks
- Starring: Jean Peters; Jeffrey Hunter; Constance Smith; Walter Brennan
- Cinematography: Edward Cronjager
- Edited by: Barbara McLean
- Music by: Franz Waxman
- Distributed by: Twentieth Century-Fox
- Release date: July 16, 1952 (Waycross, Georgia)
- Running time: 93 minutes
- Country: United States
- Language: English
- Box office: $2 million (U.S. rentals)

Lure of the Wilderness is a 1952 American Technicolor romantic adventure film directed by Jean Negulesco and starring Jean Peters, Jeffrey Hunter,Constance Smith and Walter Brennan. The screenplay is based on the 1941 novel Swamp Water by Vereen Bell. The film is a remake of Jean Renoir's 1941 adaptation of the novel, in which Brennan also appears.

== Plot ==
In the 1910s in Fargo, Georgia near the dangerous Okefenokee Swamp, Ben Tyler and his father Zack enter the swamp to search for two lost trappers. During an unsuccessful journey, Ben's dog Careless disappears while running after a deer. While looking for Careless, Ben is hit in the head by someone, and when he awakens, he finds himself captured by two people living in the wilderness: old Jim Harper and his fierce, aggressive but beautiful daughter Laurie.

Ben recognizes Jim, who has been accused of a murder committed eight years ago. Fearing lynching, Jim and his daughter have since fled the nearby village to live in the wilderness. Jim admits to one killing, claiming that it was committed in self-defense, but he insists that the other murder was committed by the vicious Longden brothers. Despite Laurie's clear lack of trust in him, Ben believes Jim's story and tells them that he wants to return to civilization to receive a fair trial.

Over the following days, Ben accompanies Jim and Laurie in their routine, which includes hunting. Laurie's hostility toward Ben softens and they share a mutual attraction. During a short return home, Ben outrages his father and fiancée Noreen by announcing that he will soon return to the swamp. Noreen states that she does not plan to wait for him and that she will seek another beau. At a dance, Noreen provokes a fight between Ben and her date Jack Doran, and Ben eventually cancels the engagement.

Noreen follows Ben to Laurie and discovers her identity. She falsely claims to Laurie that Ben has betrayed the Harpers and she then informs the Longdens about Ben's interference with Jim and Laurie. As revenge, the Longdens nearly drown Ben and later try to find the Harpers to kill them so that the truth will not emerge. Ben also enters the swamp to warn Jim and Laurie, who do not initially believe his warnings until Ben becomes a target of the Longdens. After Jim is shot by one of them, Laurie sets a trap that kills one of the brothers and captures the other. The Harpers' name is cleared and they are finally able to return to civilization, accompanied by Ben.

== Cast ==
- Jean Peters as Laurie Harper
- Jeffrey Hunter as Ben Tyler
- Constance Smith as Noreen McGowan
- Walter Brennan as Jim Harper
- Tom Tully as Zack Taylor
- Harry Shannon as Pat McGowan
- Will Wright as Sheriff Brink
- Jack Elam as Dave Longden
- Harry Carter as Ned Tyler

== Production ==
In September 1951, Debra Paget was set to star in the lead. The film marks the first lead role for Jeffrey Hunter.

== Release ==
Civic leaders of Waycross, Georgia, the nearest city to the Okefenokee Swamp, and the city of Atlanta placed competitive bids to host the film's world premiere on July 17, 1952. A dual premiere at 12:01 a.m. was planned as a compromise by Twentieth Century-Fox, but Waycross mayor Sam Odum orchestrated a publicity stunt by declaring the town to be following "Okefenokee Swamp Midnight Saving Time", with the official time in Waycross temporarily 151 minutes behind Eastern Time. This meant that although the film was screened simultaneously in Waycross and Atlanta, the time in Waycross was actually 9:30 p.m. the previous day, July 16.

== Reception ==
In a contemporary review for The New York Times, critic Bosley Crowther wrote: "[W]ith all the chill menace of the swamplands that Fox has got into this film, it hasn't got into it a story or acting that carries any conviction at all. ... Miss Peters presents an appearance that resembles nothing so much as a Campfire Girl got up for a patriotic pageant in her role of a swamp barbarian. And Mr. Brennan, in his rolled-lapel tatters, makes an uncomfortable looking hermit all around. Mr. Hunter is cheerful but callow in the synthetic drama they have to play, and several others are merely good performers in conventional back-country roles. Since all of this solemn dramatizing takes place in the Okefenokee Swamp, we hopefully looked for Pogo, but couldn't find him. Too bad. He'd help the show."
