= Thomas Benton Wheeler =

American politician from Texas (1840–1913)

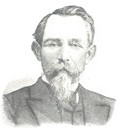

16th Lieutenant Governor of Texas
- In office January 19, 1887 – January 21, 1891
- Governor: Lawrence Sullivan Ross
- Preceded by: Barnett Gibbs
- Succeeded by: George C. Pendleton

Judge of the 12th Judicial District Court of Texas
- In office 1880–1886

23rd Mayor of Austin
- In office 1872–1877
- Preceded by: John W. Glenn
- Succeeded by: Jacob Carl DeGress

Personal details
- Born: June 7, 1840 Marshall County, Alabama, U.S.
- Died: February 21, 1913 (aged 72) San Antonio, Texas, U.S.
- Party: Democratic
- Children: 2

Military service
- Allegiance: Confederate States
- Branch/service: Confederate States Army
- Rank: Captain
- Commands: Company E, Ragsdale's Battalion Texas Cavalry
- Battles/wars: American Civil War

Thomas Benton Wheeler (June 7, 1840 – February 21, 1913) was an American judge and politician who served as the 23rd mayor of Austin from 1872 to 1877 and as the 16th lieutenant governor of Texas from 1887 to 1891. He was a member of the Democratic Party.

== Early life ==
Thomas Benton Wheeler was born in Marshall County, Alabama on June 7, 1840. At the outbreak of the American Civil War, Wheeler enlisted as a private in Company A of Peter C. Woods's regiment of the confederate army. He was soon promoted to captain and commanded Company E of Ragsdale's Battalion Texas Cavalry. Following the end of the war, Wheeler moved to Austin, Texas, where he began to practice law. In 1867 he became county attorney of Travis County, a position where he was ultimately removed from by Union officials as an impediment to Reconstruction.

== Political career and death ==
Thomas Benton Wheeler was first elected as Mayor of Austin in 1872, a position which he held until 1877. After his tenure as Mayor, Wheller moved to Breckenridge in Stephens County where he was elected judge of the 12th Judicial District in 1880. He was re-elected to the position in 1884, but resigned in 1886 following his election as Lieutenant Governor of Texas with his term lasting from January 19, 1887, to January 21, 1891. Wheeler died in a hotel in San Antonio on February 21, 1913, he lies buried at Prairie View Cemetery in Aransas Pass, Texas.

== See also ==
- List of lieutenant governors of Texas

Political offices
Preceded by John W. Glenn	Mayor of Austin; 1872–1877	Succeeded by Jacob Carl DeGress
Preceded by Barnett Gibbs	Lieutenant Governor of Texas; 1887–1891	Succeeded by George C. Pendleton
