= Vereen Bell =

American writer

Vereen M. Bell
- Born: 5 October 1911; Cairo, Georgia
- Died: 26 October 1944 (aged 33); Leyte Gulf
- Military career
- Allegiance: United States
- Branch: United States Navy
- Unit: USS Gambier Bay (CVE-73)
- Conflicts: World War II: Battle of Leyte Gulf †
- Other work: Novelist Notable works-Swamp Water

Vereen M. Bell (5 October 1911 – 26 October 1944) was an American novelist and naval officer who was killed in action during World War II.

== Early life ==
Born in Cairo, Georgia, to Jennie Vereen and Judge Reason Chesnutt Bell, Vereen Bell attended public schools before graduating from the Davidson College in North Carolina in 1932.

== Career ==
After writing several short stories and editing magazines, Bell wrote the novel Swamp Water, set in the Okefenokee Swamp. It was originally published in 1940 as a serial in the Saturday Evening Post. The novel was successfully adapted as a film (B&W) of the same title in 1941 and again as a color film, Lure of the Wilderness, in 1952.

Bell continued writing while serving in the Navy in World War II. In May 1944, he was observed pecking at a typewriter in a stateroom on his ship, the USS Gambier Bay (CVE-73). The working title of his last work was, The Renegade Queen.

== Death ==
In World War II, Bell was a lieutenant assigned as an intelligence officer to Composite Squadron VC-10 aboard the USS Gambier Bay, an escort carrier. In the Battle off Samar, on 25 October 1944, the Gambier Bay was part of a task force attacked by Vice Admiral Takeo Kurita's "Center Force". Bell rushed to the ready room to put on his flying gear but was ordered by the VC-10 commander, Lt. Cdr. Edward Huxtable, to remain on board. Bell survived the sinking of the Gambier Bay that morning but succumbed to exposure and delirium sometime during the evening of the 26th.

== Legacy ==
"Vereen Bell Highway" was named after Bell in Ware County, Georgia.

Davidson College now awards the Vereen Bell Award for creative writing in his honor.
