= Rollin S. Woodruff =

American politician and governor of Connecticut (1854–1925)

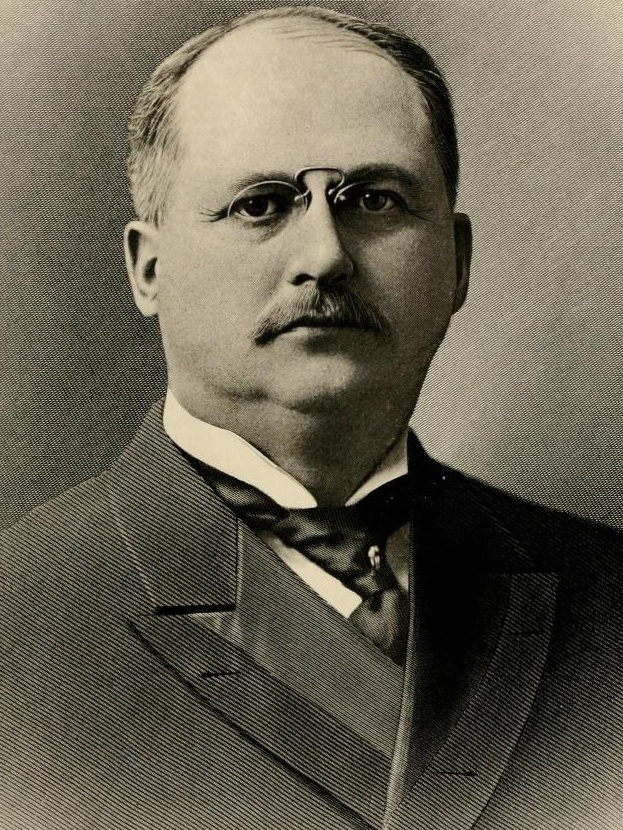

62nd Governor of Connecticut
- In office January 9, 1907 – January 6, 1909
- Lieutenant: Everett J. Lake
- Preceded by: Henry Roberts
- Succeeded by: George L. Lilley

71st Lieutenant Governor of Connecticut
- In office January 4, 1905 – January 9, 1907
- Governor: Henry Roberts
- Preceded by: Henry Roberts
- Succeeded by: Everett J. Lake

Member of the Connecticut Senate
- In office 1903

Personal details
- Born: July 14, 1854 Rochester, New York
- Died: June 30, 1925 (aged 70) Guilford Center, Connecticut
- Party: Republican
- Spouse: Kaomeo E. Perkins

Rollin Simmons Woodruff (July 14, 1854 – June 30, 1925) was an American politician and the 62nd governor of Connecticut.

== Biography ==
Woodruff was born in Rochester, New York on July 14, 1854. He was the son of Jeremiah Woodruff, who was a minister; and Clarissa "Clorise" Thompson Woodruff. He was educated in the public schools of Rochester and New Haven. He married Kaomeo E. Perkins on January 14, 1880, and they had three children, all of whom died young.

== Career ==
Woodruff was a successful businessman and was involved in several banks and corporations. He was a director of the Mechanics Bank of New Haven, the Connecticut Savings Bank, and the Connecticut Computing Machine Company. He was vice president of the Federal Adding Machine Company. In addition, Woodruff was president of Grace Hospital of New Haven and C. S. Mersick Company, a manufacturer and wholesaler of heavy hardware, railroad supplies, machinist supplies and other metal products.

Beginning in 1896 became active in the state militia, and in 1899 he was appointed aide-de-camp to Governor George E. Lounsbury with the rank of colonel.

In 1902 he became a member of the Connecticut Society of the Sons of the American Revolution.

A Republican, he was elected to one term in the Connecticut State Senate in 1903, and was chosen the Senate's President pro tempore.

He was President of New Haven's Chamber of Commerce from 1905 to 1907.

Woodruff became the 71st Lieutenant Governor of Connecticut in 1905. He held that position until 1907.

Winning the 1906 Republican gubernatorial nomination, Woodruff became the Governor of Connecticut on January 9, 1907. During his term, he vetoed several acts of the legislature, arguing that they were too costly. Woodruff remained active in his business. He became a member of the Union League Club. He also served as a member of the New Haven Young Men's Republican Club.

== Death ==
Woodruff died in Guilford Center, Connecticut on June 30, 1925, exactly two weeks short of his 71st birthday. He is interred at Evergreen Cemetery, New Haven, Connecticut.

Party political offices
Preceded by Henry Roberts	Republican nominee for Governor of Connecticut; 1906	Succeeded by George L. Lilley
Political offices
Preceded by Henry Roberts	Lieutenant Governor of Connecticut; 1905–1907	Succeeded by Everett J. Lake
Preceded by Henry Roberts	Governor of Connecticut; 1907–1909	Succeeded by George L. Lilley
