= 1898 Texas gubernatorial election =

- November 3, 1898
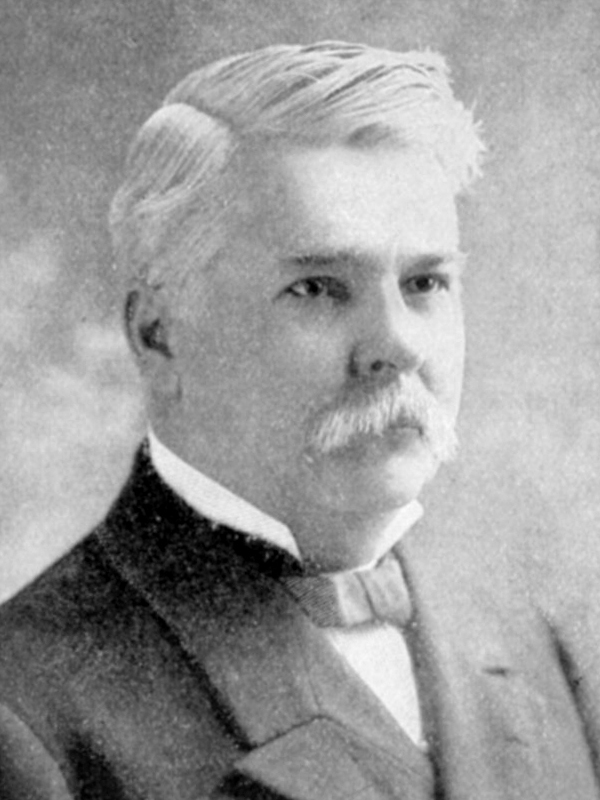

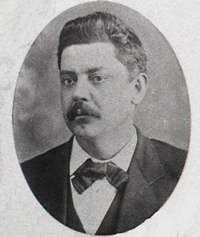
Candidate	Joseph D. Sayers	Barnett Gibbs
Party	Democratic	Populist
Alliance		Republican
Popular vote	291,548	114,955
Percentage	71.19%	28.07%
- County results Sayers: 50–60% 60–70% 70–80% 80–90% 90–100% Gibbs: 50–60% 60–70% No data/vote
Governor before election
Charles Culberson
Democratic
Governor-elect
Joseph D. Sayers
Democratic

The 1898 Texas gubernatorial election was held to elect the governor of Texas. Joseph D. Sayers was elected over Barnett Gibbs, a Populist running with Republican support.

== General election ==
The presidential election of 1896 saw the national Democratic and Populist tickets fuse to back the candidacy of William Jennings Bryan. On the state level, many Populists opposed the fusion since the Democrats were the dominant political party in the state and the Populists had been gaining ground in recent elections as the main opposition party. The outcome of the election led the Texas Populist Party to continue to embrace their anti-fusion stance, however many Populist voters did return to the Democratic party given their now similar platforms. The Populist Party convention was well attended and former lieutenant governor Barnett Gibbs was nominated for lieutenant governor.

Heading into the 1898 election the Democratic Party implemented a plan to allow their party membership to hold primary elections in their counties to instruct their delegates on how to vote in the statewide convention. The choice was left to the county though on whether to hold a primary vote or the traditional convention. These primary votes settled most of the nominations prior to the statewide convention in August and Joseph Sayers was nominated for governor without any opposition.

The Texas Republican Party had split into two rival political groups over the last few elections due to racial politics. The "Regular" Republicans also known as the Black and Tan faction had been willing to accept the participation and leadership of African-American voters in the party as opposed to the "Reform" faction, also known as the "Lily-Whites". The 1898 State Convention marked a reunification of the party, though they ultimately did not nominate any candidates for statewide office.

=== Campaign ===
Lafayette L. Foster was the chairman of the Sayers Central Campaign Committee. In the summer of 1898, he was appointed as the president of the Agricultural and Mechanical College of Texas by the board of directors of the college. He was succeeded as chairman by Edward M. House.

Gibbs, a moderate Populist, primarily campaigned on the issue of building a state-owned "relief railroad" from the Red River to the Gulf of Mexico.

=== Candidates ===
- R. P. Bailey (Prohibition)
- Martin McNulty Crane, Attorney General, former lieutenant governor, former state senator and representative (Democratic) (withdrawn)
- Barnett Gibbs, former state senator from Dallas and lieutenant governor (Populist)
- G. H. Royal (Socialist Labor)
- Joseph D. Sayers, U.S. representative from Bastrop, former lieutenant governor (Democratic)

=== Results ===
1898 Texas gubernatorial election
Party	Candidate	Votes	%	±%
Democratic	Joseph D. Sayers	291,548	71.19%	▲15.83
Populist	Barnett Gibbs	114,955	28.07%	▼16.11
Prohibition	R. P. Bailey	2,437	0.60%	▲0.26
Socialist Labor	G. H. Royal	552	0.13%	N/A
Write-in		62	0.02%	▼0.11
Total votes		409,554	100.00%	
