= 1898 Texas lieutenant gubernatorial election =

- November 8, 1898
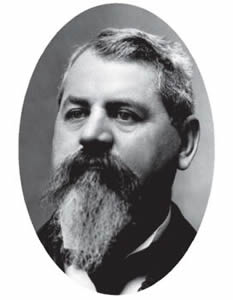

| Nominee | James Browning | E. W. Kirkpatrick |
| Party | Democratic | Populist |
| Popular vote | 290,792 | 107,722 |
| Percentage | 72.36% | 26.81% |
Lieutenant Governor before election
George Taylor Jester
Democratic
Elected Lieutenant Governor
James Browning
Democratic

The 1898 Texas lieutenant gubernatorial election was held on November 8, 1898 in order to elect the lieutenant governor of Texas. Democratic nominee and former member of the Texas House of Representatives James Browning defeated Populist nominee E. W. Kirkpatrick.

== Background ==
The presidential election of 1896 saw the national Democratic and Populist tickets fuse to back the candidacy of William Jennings Bryan. On the state level, many Populists opposed the fusion since the Democrats were the dominant political party in the state and the Populists had been gaining ground in recent elections as the main opposition party. The outcome of the election led the Texas Populist Party to continue to embrace their anti-fusion stance, however many Populist voters did return to the Democratic party given their now similar platforms. The Populist Party convention was well attended and E. W. Kirkpatrick of Collin County was nominated for lieutenant governor.

Heading into the 1898 election the Democratic Party implemented a plan to allow their party membership to hold primary elections in their counties to instruct their delegates on how to vote in the statewide convention. The choice was left to the county though on whether to hold a primary vote or the traditional convention. These primary votes settled most of the nominations prior to the statewide convention in August and James Browning of Amarillo was nominated for lieutenant governor without any opposition.

The Texas Republican Party had split into two rival political groups over the last few elections due to racial politics. The "Regular" Republicans also known as the Black and Tan faction had been willing to accept the participation and leadership of African-American voters in the party as opposed to the "Reform" faction, also known as the "Lily-Whites". The 1898 State Convention marked a reunification of the party, though they ultimately did not nominate any candidates for statewide office.

== General election ==
On election day, November 8, 1898, Democratic nominee James Browning won the election by a margin of 183,070 votes against his foremost opponent Populist nominee E. W. Kirkpatrick, thereby retaining Democratic control over the office of lieutenant governor. Browning was sworn in as the 20th lieutenant governor of Texas on January 17, 1899.

=== Candidates ===
- Edmund Bellinger (Socialist Labor)
- James Nathan Browning, lawyer from Amarillo, former state representative, former justice of the peace, former Shakelford County attorney (Democrat)
- Elbert Wiley Kirkpatrick, horticulturalist, president of the Texas Nut Growers Association and Texas State Nurserymen's Association (Populist)
- D. H. Hancock (Prohibition)

=== Results ===
Texas lieutenant gubernatorial election, 1898
| Party | Candidate | Votes | % |
|---|---|---|---|
| Democratic | James Browning | 290,792 | 72.36 |
| Populist | E. W. Kirkpatrick | 107,722 | 26.81 |
| Prohibition | D. H. Hancock | 2,439 | 0.61 |
| Write-in | | 894 | 0.22 |
| Total votes | | 401,847 | 100.00 |
| Democratic hold | | | |
