= John H. Bailey =

American politician

Texas Representative
- In office 24th session – 26th session

Texas Senator
- In office 34th session – 39th session

Personal details
- Born: September 22, 1864 Sussex, Virginia, USA
- Died: August 27, 1940 (aged 75) Austin, Texas, USA
- Parent(s): Luther Rice Bailey; Mary Ellen Crank

John H. Bailey (September 22, 1864 – August 27, 1940) was a senator and a representative from the state of Texas.

== Life ==
Bailey was born on September 22, 1864, to Luther Rice Bailey (May 3, 1837 – April 28, 1918) and Mary Ellen Crank (1842–1920), one of their nine children. He never married and did not have any children.

== Politics ==
He first was a Texas representative from the 24th–26th sessions (about 6 years). And then served as a Texas Senator from the 34th–39th sessions (15 years 5 months).
