= James K. Hines =

American judge (1852–1932)

James Kollock Hines
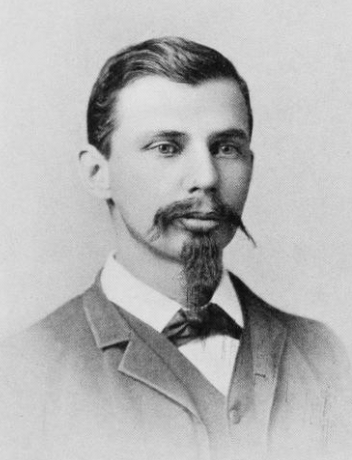
- c. 1900

Justice of the Supreme Court of Georgia
- In office 1922–1932
- Preceded by: Walter Franklin George
- Succeeded by: Reason Chesnutt Bell

Personal details
- Born: November 18, 1852
- Died: March 19, 1932 (aged 79)
- Education: Emory University

James Kollock Hines (November 18, 1852 – March 19, 1932) was a Populist Party politician and an associate justice of the Supreme Court of Georgia. He served on the Georgia Supreme Court from 1922 to 1932.

An alumnus of Emory University, The New Georgia Encyclopedia describes him as an urbane lawyer from a distinguished family who worked in Atlanta. He narrowly lost the 1894 election for Governor of Georgia to William Yates Atkinson.

George W. Foote designed his 1907 home at Peach Tree and 11th streets in Atlanta.

His father was Joseph Hines who served as a state representative in the Georgia House. James Hines also served in the state house before being appointed a judge by the governor. He married Belle Evans and remarried after her death. He had three daughters.

Political offices
Preceded by Walter F. George	Justice of the Supreme Court of Georgia; 1922–1932	Succeeded by R. C. Bell
