= William Branch Sayers =

American politician, lawyer and military officer (1843–1898)

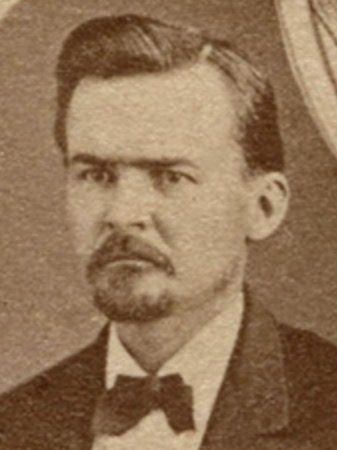
- Sayers' portrait for the 13th Texas Legislature

Member of the Texas House of Representatives from the 27th district
- In office January 14, 1873 – April 18, 1876
- Preceded by: W. W. Davis; Anderson J. Dorris; James F. McKee
- Succeeded by: George U. Mead; Philip Edward Peers

Personal details
- Born: February 22, 1843 Canton, Mississippi, US
- Died: February 24, 1898 (aged 55) Gonzales, Texas, US
- Relations: Joseph D. Sayers (brother)
- Occupation: Politician, lawyer, military officer

Military service
- Allegiance: Confederate States of America
- Years of service: 1861–1865
- Rank: Major general
- Unit: Terry's Texas Rangers
- Battles/wars: American Civil War; Battle of Rowlett's Station; Battle of Shiloh; Battle of Stones River; Battle of Chickamauga; First Battle of Dalton; Battle of Monroe's Crossroads; Action of 26–27 April 1864; Atlanta campaign; Sherman's March to the Sea; Battle of Resaca; Battle of New Hope Church; Battle of Kennesaw Mountain

William Branch Sayers (February 22, 1843 – February 24, 1898) was an American politician, lawyer, and military officer. A Democrat, he was a member of the Texas House of Representatives.

Sayers was born in Mississippi and was a brother of Joseph D. Sayers. He moved to Texas as a child. He fought in the American Civil War, participating in combat over 250 times. After the war, he became a lawyer. He was a member of the House from 1873 to 1876.

== Early life ==
Sayers was born on February 22, 1843, in Canton, Mississippi, the son of David Sayers and Mary (née Peete) Sayers (died 1847). His older brother was Joseph D. Sayers. By 1850, he and his family lived in Tallahatchie County, and in 1851, moved to Bastrop, Texas. He received his early education in Bastrop.

== Military service ==
Sayers attended Bastrop Academy, graduating in 1861. At the outbreak of the American Civil War, he worked to enlist and organize troops in Grimes and Lavaca Counties. In September 1861, he enlisted as a private into Terry's Texas Rangers. Later promoted to sergeant major, he was part of the unit's field staff, being again promoted to adjutant by Thomas Harrison.

Sayers was again promoted to major, possibly serving on the staff of the Adjutant and Inspector General Bureau of the Confederate States War Department. He was eventually promoted to brigadier general, and by the time of his retirement from the military in 1865, was a major general.

Over the course of the war, Sayers fought in over 250 battles and skirmishes. Battles he fought in included the Battle of Rowlett's Station; the Battle of Shiloh; the Battle of Stones River; the Battle of Chickamauga; the First Battle of Dalton; the Action of 26–27 April 1864; the Atlanta campaign; and the Battle of Monroe's Crossroads. He also fought against the Union in Sherman's March to the Sea, namely in the Battle of Resaca, the Battle of New Hope Church, and the Battle of Kennesaw Mountain. At Chickamauga, he had to be helped on his horse due to illness, though still helped form the line. He was greatly wounded at Monroe's Crossroads.

== Career ==
Following the war, Sayers returned to Bastrop, later moving to Gonzales County. He read law and was admitted to the bar. In 1867, he formed a partnership with James Francis Miller. On October 2, of either 1865 or 1868, they founded the bank Miller & Sayers, in Gonzalez. He helped improve the county.

Sayers was a Democrat. He was a member of the Texas House of Representatives, from January 14, 1873, to April 18, 1876, representing the 27th district. While serving, he was chairman of the Committees on Constitutional Amendments; and on State Affairs. He was a member of the Committees on Apportionment; on Engrossed Bills; on Federal Relations; on Finance; on the Judiciary; on Military Affairs; and on Rules.

== Personal life and death ==
In 1874, Sayers married Adele Lockart, with whom he had two sons. He was a member of the Knights Templar. In 1898, he was unanimously voted commander-in-chief of the Texas division of the United Confederate Veterans. He died on February 24, 1898, aged 55, in Gonzales, and was buried at Gonzales Masonic Cemetery.
