= 1902 Texas gubernatorial election =

- November 4, 1902
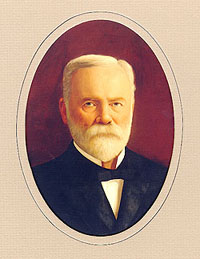

Candidate	S. W. T. Lanham	George W. Burkett
Party	Democratic	Republican
Popular vote	269,076	65,706
Percentage	74.92%	18.29%
- County results Lanham: 50–60% 60–70% 70–80% 80–90% 90–100% Burkett: 40–50% 50–60% 60–70% No Data/Vote
Governor before election
Joseph D. Sayers
Democratic
Governor-elect
S. W. T. Lanham
Democratic

The 1902 Texas gubernatorial election was held to elect the Governor of Texas. S. W. T. Lanham was elected over Republican George W. Burkett in a landslide.

== General election ==
=== Candidates ===
- George Washington Carroll, Beaumont alderman and lumber and oil businessman (Prohibition)
- George Washington Burkett, banker and businessman (Republican)
- Walter W. Freeman (Socialist)
- S. W. T. Lanham, U.S. Representative from Weatherford and unsuccessful candidate for the Democratic nomination for governor in 1894 (Democratic)
- J. M. Mallett (Populist)
- G. H. Royal, perennial nominee (Socialist Labor)

=== Results ===
1902 Texas gubernatorial election
Party	Candidate	Votes	%	±%
Democratic	S. W. T. Lanham	269,076	74.92%	▲7.36
Republican	George W. Burkett	65,706	18.29%	▼6.83
Populist	J. M. Mallett	12,387	3.45%	▼2.47
Prohibition	George W. Carroll	8,708	2.42%	N/A
Write-in		3,273 (Note: Royal and Freeman were listed on the ballot, but their totals are included in the "scattering" vote in the official report.)	0.91%	▼0.44
Total votes		359,150	100.00%	
