= Swamp Water =

1941 film by Jean Renoir

- Theatrical poster
- Directed by: Jean Renoir
- Screenplay by: Dudley Nichols
- Based on: Swamp Water by Vereen Bell
- Produced by: Irving Pichel
- Starring: Walter Brennan; Walter Huston; Anne Baxter; Dana Andrews
- Cinematography: J. Peverell Marley; Lucien Ballard (uncredited)
- Edited by: Walter Thompson
- Music by: David Buttolph
- Production company: 20th Century Fox
- Distributed by: 20th Century Fox
- Release date: October 23, 1941
- Running time: 90 minutes
- Country: United States
- Language: English
- Budget: $601,900

Swamp Water is a 1941 American Southern Gothic film noir directed by Jean Renoir and starring Walter Brennan, Walter Huston and Anne Baxter. Based on the novel by Vereen Bell, it was produced at 20th Century Fox. The film was shot on location at Okefenokee Swamp, Waycross, Georgia, USA. It was Renoir's first American film. The film was remade in 1952 as Lure of the Wilderness, directed by Jean Negulesco.

== Plot ==
A local man, Ben Ragan (Dana Andrews) encounters Tom Keefer (Walter Brennan), a fugitive from a murder charge while searching the Okefenokee Swamp for his dog, “Trouble.” Initially suspicious of each other, Tom survives a snake bite and the two form a partnership in which Ben sells the animals hunted and trapped by both. Eventually townsfolk become suspicious. Also, Ben helps Julie, Keefer's daughter, who is living in straitened circumstances, clean up and look more decent. Keefer is accused of murdering Deputy Shep Collins, but it was really the Dorson brothers who committed the crime and then perjured themselves in evidence against Tom Keefer, assisted by Jesse Wick. Ben makes Wick confess so that Keefer will not be blamed anymore. As Ben and Keefer head out of the swamp and back to town, where Keefer will regain his normal life, they are ambushed by the Dorson brothers. One of them sinks in a mudhole, and Keefer accosts the other man, saying he wants a normal life, and tells him go find a way to live the rest of his life in the swamp, or head back to town to be hanged. Ben and Keefer are found by the townsfolk. Once back in town, Keefer cleans up, and happily attends a dance with his daughter and Ben.

== Cast ==
- Walter Brennan as Tom Keefer
- Walter Huston as Thursday Ragan
- Anne Baxter as Julie
- Dana Andrews as Ben Ragan
- Virginia Gilmore as Mabel MacKenzie
- John Carradine as Jesse Wick
- Mary Howard as Hannah Ragan
- Eugene Pallette as Sheriff Jeb McKane
- Ward Bond as Tim Dorson
- Guinn 'Big Boy' Williams as Bud Dorson (as Guinn Williams)
- Russell Simpson as Marty McCord
- Joe Sawyer as Hardy Ragan (as Joseph Sawyer)
- Paul E. Burns as Tulle McKenzie (as Paul Burns)
- Dave Morris as Barber
- Frank Austin as Fred Ulm
- Matt Willis as Miles Tonkin
- Mae Marsh as Mrs. McCord (uncredited)

== Production ==
The film was shot on location at Okefenokee Swamp, Waycross, Georgia, and was Renoir's first American film. Renoir found it difficult to adapt to efficient Hollywood shooting standards, insisting on allowing a large number of takes from the actors. Renoir claimed in his autobiography that due to overindulgence he was fired by Zanuck one morning and rehired the same evening.

== Reception ==
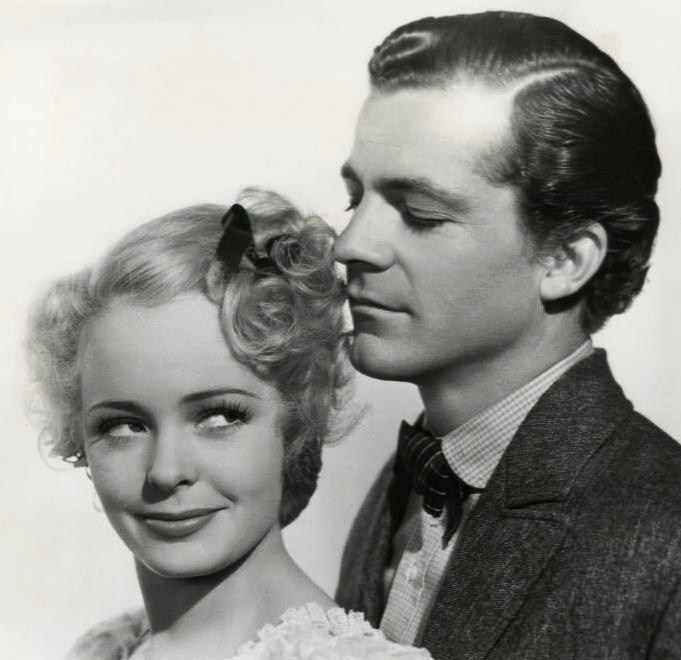
Virginia Gilmore and Dana Andrews in Renoir's Swamp Water

Although Renoir had difficulty adapting to Hollywood production methods, the film was popular at the box office and made a profit. "Red River Valley" was the main theme song.

Dave Kehr of The New York Times noted that the "crude wooden cross, planted in a shallow channel and topped with a human skull" in the film was a "strikingly morbid image for the usually warm and optimistic Renoir", and testament to it being a difficult time for him. He concluded that Swamp Water "may not represent the film that Renoir wanted to make", but is "no less fascinating as the film that Renoir was able to make — at that point in his life and at that point in history". Jonathan Rosenbaum of the Chicago Reader concurred, commenting that despite the production setbacks, the film has "certain beauties and pleasures". Time Out thought the film looked "a bit drab and unbelievable" despite the location filming, describing it as "a rather sullen affair set in a Georgia swamp which harbours snakes, alligators, mud, and Walter Brennan, a fugitive criminal with whom the hero (Andrews) becomes strangely and melodramatically involved."

Film critic Raymond Durgnat wrote: "In certain aspects, Swamp Water compromises between a Western and Toni. It resembles the former in that violence is consistent and integral rather than spasmodic and, as it were, incidental. Yet the integration of violence and communal emotion is simpler than in the tortuous constructions of William Faulkner." Durgnat thought that Anne Baxter's character was reminiscent of Gene Tierney's in Tobacco Road. Several critics, including Dennis Schwartz, noticed that the casting was typical of a John Ford western. Schwartz praised Andrews's performance, but wrote: "Even though it is only one of Renoir's lesser films, thanks to the interference by Zanuck, it still was one of Fox's highest grossing films of 1941. But if you ever wondered or cared why so many Hollywood films suck, this film should give you a strong hint why." He awarded it a B grade.

== Influence ==
The narrative elements of the 2012 coming-of-age film Mud, directed by Jeff Nichols and starring Matthew McConaughey, have been compared to those of Swamp Water.
