= 1902 Wisconsin lieutenant gubernatorial election =

- November 4, 1902
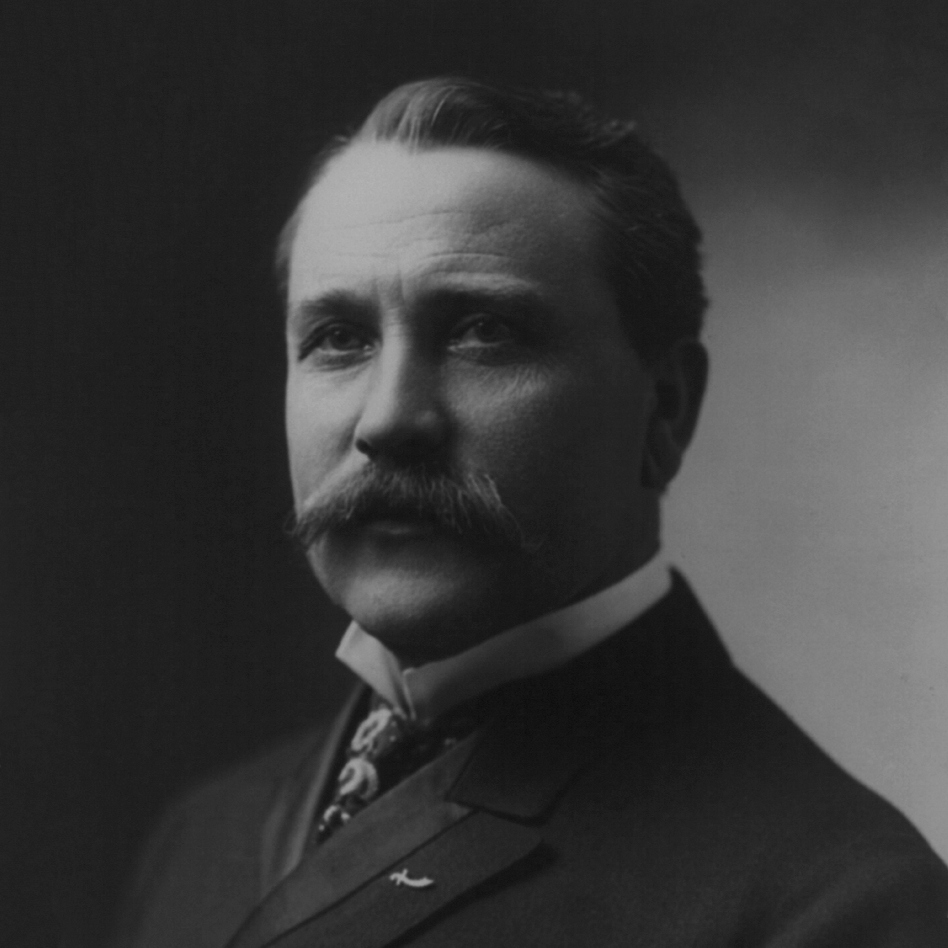

Nominee	James O. Davidson	John Wattawa
Party	Republican	Democratic
Popular vote	194,449	135,127
Percentage	54.47%	37.85%
Lieutenant Governor before election
Jesse Stone
Republican
Elected Lieutenant Governor
James O. Davidson
Republican

The 1902 Wisconsin lieutenant gubernatorial election was held on November 4, 1902, in order to elect the lieutenant governor of Wisconsin. Republican nominee and incumbent Treasurer of Wisconsin James O. Davidson defeated Democratic nominee John Wattawa, Social Democratic nominee Robert Saltiel and Prohibition nominee Wesley Mott.

== General election ==
On election day, November 4, 1902, Republican nominee James O. Davidson won the election by a margin of 59,322 votes against his foremost opponent Democratic nominee John Wattawa, thereby retaining Republican control over the office of lieutenant governor. Davidson was sworn in as the 19th lieutenant governor of Wisconsin on January 5, 1903.

=== Results ===
Wisconsin lieutenant gubernatorial election, 1902
Party	Candidate	Votes	%
Republican	James O. Davidson	194,449	54.47
Democratic	John Wattawa	135,127	37.85
Social Democratic	Robert Saltiel	17,064	4.78
Prohibition	Wesley Mott	9,471	2.65
	Scattering	872	0.25
Total votes		356,983	100.00
Republican hold			
