= Barnett Gibbs =

American politician (1851–1904)

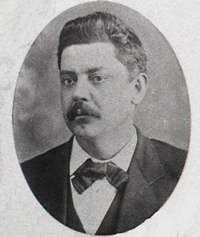
- Gibbs

15th Lieutenant Governor of Texas
- In office January 20, 1885 – January 19, 1887
- Governor: John Ireland
- Preceded by: Francis Marion Martin
- Succeeded by: Thomas Benton Wheeler

Member of the Texas Senate from the 16th district
- In office January 9, 1883 – January 13, 1885
- Preceded by: James Green McDonald Sr.
- Succeeded by: Jonathan Olinthus Terrell

Personal details
- Born: May 19, 1851 Yazoo City, Mississippi, U.S.
- Died: October 4, 1904 (aged 53) Dallas, Texas, U.S.
- Party: Democratic (before 1896, after 1899); Populist (1896-1899)

Barnett Gibbs (May 19, 1851 – October 4, 1904) was an American politician who served as the 15th lieutenant governor of Texas from 1885 to 1887.

== Biography ==
Barnett Gibbs was born in Yazoo City, Mississippi, on May 19, 1851. Originally a lawyer and populist spokesman from Mississippi, he later moved to Dallas, Texas, and served as the city attorney before becoming a Texas Senator in 1882. In 1884, he was elected as the lieutenant governor of Texas and briefly served as acting governor in 1885.

Gibbs supported farmers' interests and challenged a railroad attorney for a congressional seat in 1886, but withdrew his candidacy. He practiced law, engaged in real estate speculation, and promoted a deepwater harbor for Texas City. In 1891, he began organizing Democratic clubs to discuss farm problems, which led to his conversion to Populism in 1896.

He played a role in the People's party national convention in 1896, opposing the nomination of William Jennings Bryan for the Populist ticket. Gibbs ran unsuccessfully for the U.S. Congress in 1896 and for the Texas governorship in 1898, focusing on the idea of a state-owned "relief railroad".

After the decline of the People's party, he returned to the Democratic party in 1899 and supported William Jennings Bryan in the 1900 presidential election. Gibbs retired from politics, focusing on real estate and mining, and died in Dallas in 1904. He was a member of various organizations, including the Knights of Pythias, Odd Fellows, and the Methodist Episcopal Church, South.

Texas Senate
Preceded by James Green McDonald Sr.	Member of the Texas Senate from the 16th district 1883–1885	Succeeded by Jonathan Olinthus Terrell
Political offices
Preceded by Francis Marion Martin	Lieutenant Governor of Texas; 1885–1887	Succeeded by Thomas Benton Wheeler
