= 1902 United States elections =

- ← 1900 1901 1902 1903 1904 → Midterm elections
- Election day: November 4
- Incumbent president: ▌Theodore Roosevelt (R)
- Next Congress: 58th

Senate elections
- Overall control: Republican hold
- Seats contested: 30 of 90 seats
- Net seat change: Democratic +4
- Results of the elections: Democratic gain Democratic hold Republican gain Republican hold

House elections
- Overall control: Republican hold
- Seats contested: All 386 voting seats
- Net seat change: Democratic +25

Gubernatorial elections
- Seats contested: 27
- Net seat change: 0
- 1902 gubernatorial elections results Democratic gain Democratic hold Republican gain Republican hold Silver hold

Elections were held for the 58th United States Congress, and occurred in the middle of Republican President Theodore Roosevelt's first term, during the Fourth Party System. Roosevelt had become president on September 14, 1901, upon the assassination of his predecessor, William McKinley. The Republicans retained a majority in both chambers of Congress, while the Populist Party and the Silver Republican Party disappeared from Congress.

Reapportionment added twenty nine seats to the House. Democrats picked up several seats in the newly enlarged House, while Republicans made lesser gains. Republicans continued to control the chamber with a slightly diminished majority.

In the Senate, Republicans and Democrats each picked up one seat, while the Populist Party lost both its seats. Republicans maintained a commanding majority in the chamber.

== See also ==
- 1902 United States House of Representatives elections
- 1902–03 United States Senate elections
- 1902 United States gubernatorial elections

== Primary sources ==
- 1902 Annual Cyclopedia (1903) online; highly detailed coverage of "Political, Military, and Ecclesiastical Affairs; Public Documents; Biography, Statistics, Commerce, Finance, Literature, Science, Agriculture, and Mechanical Industry" for 1902; massive compilation of facts and primary documents; worldwide coverage; 865pp
- Colby, Frank Moore ed. The International Yearbook A Compendium Of The Worlds Progress During The Year 1902 (1903) coverage of each state online
- Democratic Campaign Book, Congressional Election 1902 ... online used by Democrats for facts and arguments during the campaign
