= S. W. T. Lanham =

Governor of Texas from 1903 to 1907

Samuel Willis Tucker Lanham
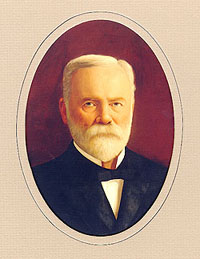

23rd Governor of Texas
- In office January 20, 1903 – January 15, 1907
- Lieutenant: George D. Neal
- Preceded by: Joseph D. Sayers
- Succeeded by: Thomas Mitchell Campbell

Member of the U.S. House of Representatives from Texas
- In office March 4, 1897 – January 15, 1903
- Preceded by: Charles K. Bell
- Succeeded by: Thomas H. Ball
- Constituency: 8th district
- In office March 4, 1883 – March 3, 1893
- Preceded by: District created
- Succeeded by: William H. Crain
- Constituency: 11th district

Personal details
- Born: Samuel Willis Tucker Lanham; July 4, 1846 near Woodruff, South Carolina, U.S.
- Died: July 29, 1908 (aged 62) Weatherford, Texas, U.S.
- Party: Democratic
- Profession: Politician, lawyer

Military service
- Allegiance: Confederate States of America
- Branch/service: Confederate Army
- Battles/wars: Battle of Spotsylvania Court House, Civil War

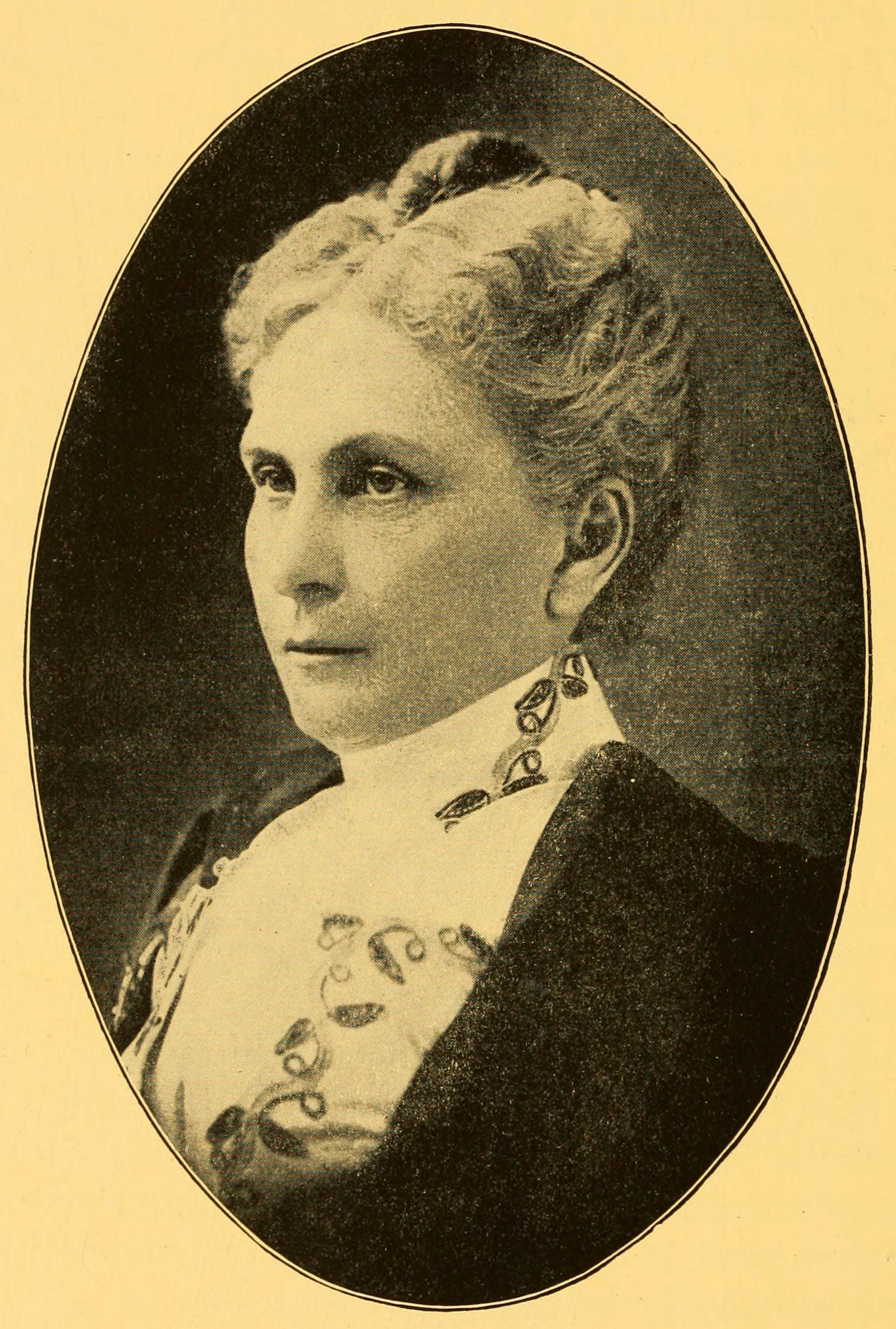
Lanham's wife, Sarah Beona Meng

Samuel Willis Tucker Lanham (July 4, 1846 – July 29, 1908) was the 23rd governor of Texas from 1903 to 1907. He was a conservative Democrat. Prior to winning election as governor, he served two periods in the US House of Representatives. He served five terms from the 11th district (which covered a vast area of West Texas) then ran for governor, losing in his first attempt. When he returned to Congress, it was in the eighth district, where he served 4 terms.

== Early years ==
Samuel Willis Tucker Lanham was born in 1846 in South Carolina to James Madison and Louisa de Aubrey (Tucker) Lanham in Spartanburg District (now County), South Carolina, and named for his maternal grandfather, Samuel Willis Tucker. When the Civil War began, Lanham volunteered for the Confederate States Army, despite the fact that he was only fifteen years old. He fought primarily in Virginia, was wounded at the Battle of Spotsylvania Court House, and after hostilities ended he married. He and his wife settled in Weatherford, Texas, where he worked and studied law.

Shortly after he was admitted to the bar in 1869, Lanham was appointed district attorney. His most famous case was the prosecution of Satanta and Big Tree, Kiowa chiefs who had led the Warren Wagon Train Raid in 1871.

In 1882, Lanham was elected to Congress for the 11th district, where he served for a decade. He ran for the governorship in 1894, losing in the primary to Charles Allen Culberson but then returned to Congress for six more years, representing the 8th district. His administration saw the founding of Southwest Texas State Normal School (now Texas State University–San Marcos).

== Governor ==
Lanham was elected Governor of Texas in 1902, taking office in January 1903. He was the last Confederate veteran to serve as governor of Texas. During his administration, many safety regulations were passed. In his first year in office, the Texas legislature passed laws limiting the number of hours a railroad employee could work and regulated child labor.

The Texas Constitution prohibited a state banking system, and in 1904 voters approved a constitutional amendment to revoke that clause. The following year the legislature passed a bill creating the state insurance and banking commission, and Lanham appointed Thomas B. Love as its first director. Over the next five years, over 500 banks were created.

Lanham took the lead in tax reform in 1905. Under the existing Texas system, the bulk of the state's income came from a general property tax, but it did not provide the amount of revenue the state wanted to spend and so, at Lanham's request, the legislature began taxing the gross receipts of express companies and pipelines. The legislature also raised taxes on intangible assets of the railroads and other industries.

The legislature also took efforts to reform election laws during Lanham's term. Before he took office, there was not a set procedure for nominating candidates for public office, which led to a great deal of fraud and many shenanigans meant to keep people from voting. The legislature passed two election reform laws during Lanham's administration, both named after their author, Judge Alexander W. Terrell. The first law, passed in 1903, allowed political parties to nominate candidates by either a convention or a primary election. The second law, in 1905, established voter qualifications, required candidates to file itemized expense statements, required primary elections for major parties (at this time, only the Democratic party was considered a major party in Texas), and set a uniform date for primaries.

Near the end of his second term, a large political scandal erupted, Before he took office, the state had filed a lawsuit against Standard Oil Company and their Texas subsidiary, the Waters-Pierce Oil Company. Waters-Pierce's license to operate was revoked, an action upheld by the U.S. Supreme Court in 1900. Partially at the urging of US Senator Joseph Weldon Bailey, Waters-Pierce received a new license to operate under Governor Joseph D. Sayers. Although they claimed to have severed all ties with Standard Oil, Texas filed suit again in 1905 on the discovery that Standard Oil still owned most of the stock in the other company. In the trial, Bailey's influence was revealed, as well as the fact that Bailey had been on the Waters-Pierce payroll at the time. Although Lanham and his administration was not accused of any wrongdoing, the controversy over Bailey's ethics was extremely large.

Lanham did not enjoy his time as governor, often wishing that he had remained in Congress. He said that "'office seekers, pardon seekers, and concession seekers overwhelmed me. They broke my health'".

After leaving office, Lanham retired to Weatherford, Texas, where he died in 1908.

== Other ==
Samuel W.T. Lanham was a Freemason. His masonic membership was of Phoenix Lodge #275 of the Grand Lodge of Texas in Weatherford, Texas.

He was considered an eloquent speaker and writer, and often made speeches at Confederate veterans' camps throughout Texas. In 1868, he joined the Masons. He received an honorary doctorate from Baylor University in June 1905. Governor Thomas M. Campbell appointed him a regent of the University of Texas in 1907.

Lanham's son Fritz Garland Lanham was also a member of the US House of Representatives, serving 14 terms from 1919 to 1947. His grandson, Edwin Lanham, was a successful novelist.

== Notes ==
Party political offices
Preceded by Joseph D. Sayers	Democratic nominee for Governor of Texas; 1902, 1904	Succeeded by Thomas Mitchell Campbell
U.S. House of Representatives
Preceded by none	Member of the U.S. House of Representatives from Texas's 11th congressional district 1883–1893	Succeeded by William H. Crain
Preceded by Charles K. Bell	Member of the U.S. House of Representatives from Texas's 8th congressional district 1897–1903	Succeeded by Thomas Henry Ball
Political offices
Preceded by Joseph D. Sayers	Governor of Texas; 1903-1907	Succeeded by Thomas Mitchell Campbell
