= Joseph D. Sayers =

Governor of Texas from 1899 to 1903

Joseph Draper Sayers
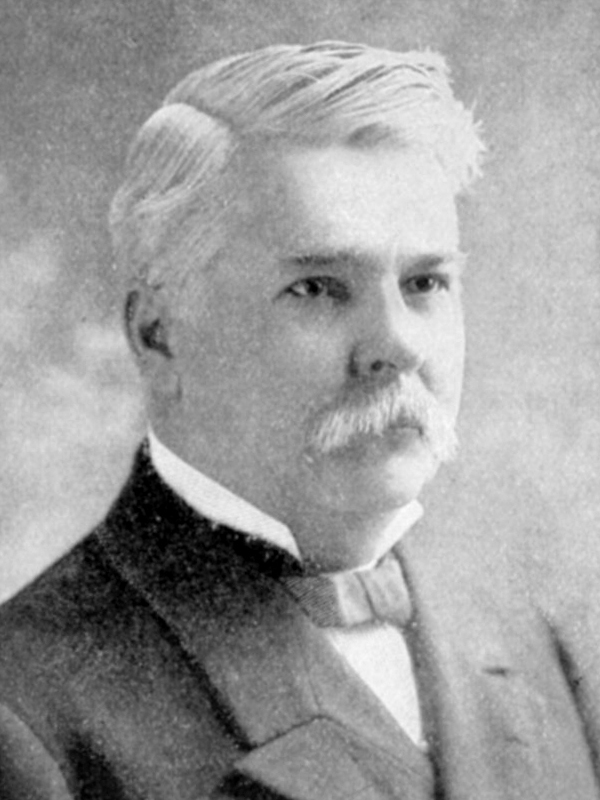
- Sayers in 1899

22nd Governor of Texas
- In office January 17, 1899 – January 20, 1903
- Lieutenant: James Browning
- Preceded by: Charles A. Culberson
- Succeeded by: S. W. T. Lanham

Member of the U.S. House of Representatives from Texas
- In office March 4, 1885 – January 16, 1899
- Preceded by: John Hancock
- Succeeded by: Albert S. Burleson
- Constituency: 10th district (1885–93); 9th district (1893–99)

12th Lieutenant Governor of Texas
- In office January 21, 1879 – January 18, 1881
- Governor: Oran M. Roberts
- Preceded by: Richard B. Hubbard
- Succeeded by: Leonidas Jefferson Storey

Member of the Texas Senate from the 26th district
- In office January 14, 1873 – January 13, 1874
- Preceded by: Reinhard Hillebrand
- Succeeded by: Hamilton Ledbetter

Personal details
- Born: September 23, 1841 Grenada, Mississippi, U.S.
- Died: May 15, 1929 (aged 87) Austin, Texas, U.S.
- Party: Democratic
- Spouse(s): Ada Walton (m. 1868-1871); Orline Walton (m. 1879)
- Relations: William Branch Sayers (brother)

Military service
- Allegiance: Confederate States
- Branch/service: Confederate States Army
- Years of service: 1861–1865
- Rank: Major
- Unit: 5th Texas Cavalry Regiment
- Battles/wars: American Civil War; Battle of Valverde; Battle of Fort Bisland (WIA); Battle of Mansfield (WIA)

Joseph Draper Sayers (September 23, 1841 – May 15, 1929) was an American politician and lawyer who served as the 22nd governor of Texas from 1899 to 1903. A conservative Democrat, he served as the 12th lieutenant governor of Texas from 1879 to 1881 and in the Texas Senate from 1873 to 1874.

== Early years ==
Joseph Sayers was born September 23, 1841, in Grenada, Mississippi, to David Sayers and his wife Mary Thomas (née Peete). His mother died in Charleston, Mississippi, in 1847, and soon after he moved to Texas with his father and younger brother, William Branch Sayers. The family settled in Bastrop, where Sayers and his brother attended the Bastrop Military Institute.

=== Civil War ===
When the Civil War broke out, Sayers joined the Confederate States Army's 5th Texas Regiment, a cavalry unit led by General Tom Green. He participated in the Battle of Valverde in New Mexico in February 1862, and was recommended for promotion for his bravery in capturing an artillery battery. Later that year he returned to Texas with his regiment before being sent to Louisiana, where he was wounded in the Battle of Fort Bisland in April 1863. His actions during that conflict led to his promotion to major, and he became Green's chief–of–staff. Sayers was wounded again in April 1864 at the Battle of Mansfield. After Green died at the Battle of Blair's Landing, Sayers became the assistant adjutant to General Richard Taylor.

=== Lawyer ===
After the war ended, Sayers returned to Texas. He opened a school and simultaneously studied law. He was admitted to the bar and then formed a partnership with G. "Wash" Jones.

=== Personal life ===
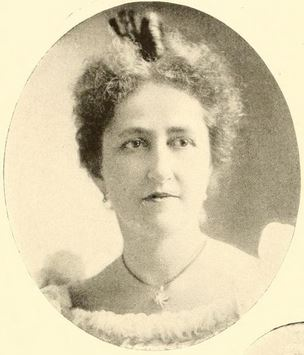
Orline Walton

In 1868, Sayers married Ada Walton. She died in 1871, less than three years after the wedding. In 1879, Sayers married Ada's younger sister, Orline Walton, an amateur painter. Orline Walton was a native of Aberdeen, Mississippi.

During her childhood, her father moved with his family to Bastrop, Texas. She was married to Joseph D. Sayers when he was Lieutenant Governor, and the first years of her married life were spent in Austin. She was a member of the Methodist church and interested in its educational work.

== Public service ==
Sayers entered political service in 1873, when he became a state senator in the 13th Texas Legislature. In his term, he helped reverse most of the legislation that had been passed under the Radical Republicans. After his term ended in 1875, Sayers spent three years as chairman of the Texas State Democratic Executive Committee. He presided over the state Democratic convention in both 1876 and 1878. At the 1878 convention he was nominated to be lieutenant governor under Oran M. Roberts and later won the election. Sayers and Roberts differed on one key point; Sayers believed that public lands should be saved for homesteaders and schools, not sold cheaply to speculators, as Roberts advocated.

=== Congress ===
Sayers was first elected to the 49th Congress as a representative of Texas's 10th congressional district in 1884. In his first election, he received 9,270 votes over his competitor, John B. Rector, who ran as an Independent. He was re-elected in 1886, 1888, 1890, 1892, 1894, and 1896. In 1888, in the election to the 51st Congress, Sayers won against the Republican nominee for the district, the popular civic leader Augustus Belknap of San Antonio. He served in Congress until 1898, when he ran for governor.

=== Campaign for governor ===
Lafayette L. Foster was the Chairman of the Sayers Central Campaign Committee. In the summer of 1898, Foster was appointed as the President of the Agricultural and Mechanical College of Texas by the Board of Directors of the college. He was succeeded as chairman by Edward M. House. Sayers was supported by House in his campaign against Martin McNulty Crane in the Democratic party primary. Sayers won the gubernatorial election against Barnett Gibbs, the Populist party candidate, and took office in early 1899.

=== Governor ===
During his term in office, labor unions were exempted from antitrust laws, and blacklists were outlawed. His term saw increased spending on education, prisons, and social service institutions and outlawed railroad rebates. He also spearheaded legislation that authorized the creation of school districts.

Sayers's term was notable for the number of disasters that the state faced. The Brazos River flooded in 1899, and the following year the Galveston Hurricane of 1900 caused great devastation. Other parts of the state suffered from a severe drought, and boll weevils caused widespread cotton destruction. Millions of dollars in assistance came to the state, and Sayers administered the distribution of the funds "honestly and fairly." He was the last Confederate soldier to hold the office.

== Later years ==
After leaving office in 1903, Sayers focused mainly on his law practice. He also took the time, however, to serve on the Board of Regents for the University of Texas System as well as on the Industrial Accident Board, the State Board of Legal Advisors, and the pardon board.

== Death and burial ==
Sayers died in Austin on May 15, 1929, and is buried in Bastrop's Fairview Cemetery.

== Notes ==
Party political offices
Preceded by Charles Allen Culberson	Democratic nominee for Governor of Texas; 1898, 1900	Succeeded by S. W. T. Lanham
Texas Senate
Preceded by Reinhard Hillebrand	Texas Senate, District 26; 1873–1874	Succeeded by William Hamilton Ledbetter
Political offices
Preceded by Richard Bennett Hubbard, Jr.	Lieutenant Governor of Texas; 1879–1881	Succeeded by Leonidas Jefferson Storey
Preceded by Charles A. Culberson	Governor of Texas; 1899–1903	Succeeded by S. W. T. Lanham
U.S. House of Representatives
Preceded by John Hancock	Member of the U.S. House of Representatives from Texas's 10th congressional district 1885–1893	Succeeded by Walter Gresham
Preceded by Edwin Le Roy Antony	Member of the U.S. House of Representatives from Texas's 9th congressional district 1893–1899	Succeeded by Albert S. Burleson
