= 1902 Danish local elections =

Regional elections were held in Denmark in 1902. 7 municipal council members were elected for Copenhagen's municipal council. The voter turnout was 45.5%.
