= 1900 Texas gubernatorial election =

- November 6, 1900
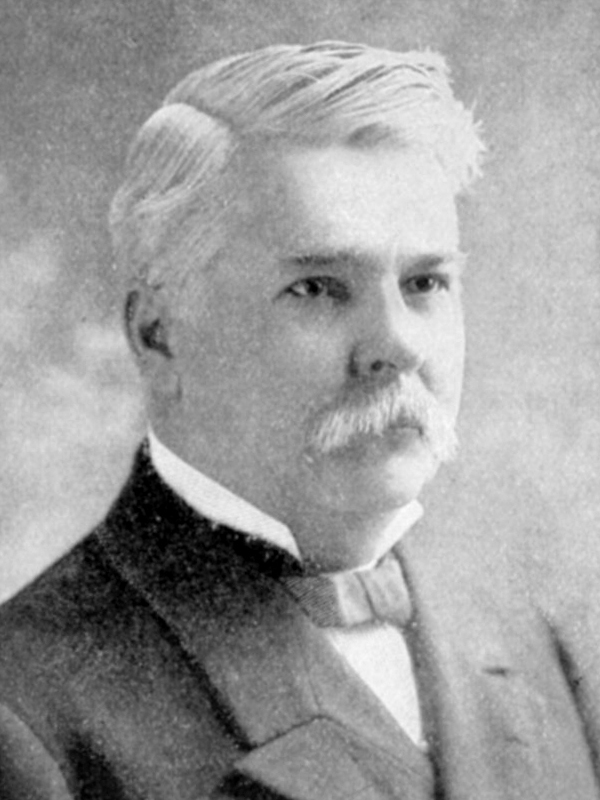

Candidate	Joseph D. Sayers	R. E. Hanney	T. J. McMinn
Party	Democratic	Republican	Populist
Popular vote	303,556	112,864	26,579
Percentage	67.56%	25.12%	5.92%
- County results Sayers: 40–50% 50–60% 60–70% 70–80% 80–90% 90–100% Hanney: 40–50% 50–60% 60–70% 70–80% No Data/Vote
Governor before election
Joseph D. Sayers
Democratic
Governor-elect
Joseph D. Sayers
Democratic

The 1900 Texas gubernatorial election was held to elect the Governor of Texas. Incumbent Governor Joseph D. Sayers was re-elected to a second term in office.

== Background ==
During this period Texas was a part of the Solid South and the Democratic Party was overwhelmingly favored in local and state elections. The main opposition party for the previous decade had been the Populist Party, but after the results of the 1896 election they had seen their popularity with voters diminish in the state. With the ongoing 1900 Presidential election the national Populist party was split on whether to repeat the strategy of electoral fusion with the Democrats or maintaining an independent organization. The Texas Populists were dominated by "middle of the roaders" who had opposed the national party's fusion with the Democrats in the previous election and continued to do so in the current one. The internal conflict further broke the party's organization as a majority of the State's executive committee broke from the "middle of the roaders" and supported fusion. At the nominating convention in July, the delegates nominated Jerome Kearby for governor. Kearby had been the party's nominee for governor in 1896 and was a prominent advocate of the "middle of the road" strategy. However after the convention the executive committee removed Kearby from their state ticket and replaced him with T. J. McMinn.

The Texas Republican Party also faced internal divisions, primarily over racial tensions. The "Black and Tan" faction which at the time was led by William M. McDonald had been in charge of the mainline Republican Party but a personal rivalry with Henry C. Ferguson led to there being two rival conventions being held, each claiming to be the legitimate organization. These simultaneous conventions each nominated their own slate of candidates for statewide office with the McDonald faction selecting George W. Burkett and the Ferguson faction selecting R. E. Hanney to be their respective nominees for governor. The state party under McDonald planned to expel all members of the rival faction from the party, but the Ferguson faction managed to get support from the National Republican Party which recognized the Ferguson faction and Hanney as the legitmate ticket.

While the Democratic party convention was characterized as being "the most acrimonious and bitter fight in the history of the Democratic party" since the election of 1873, the fight was mostly contained to the details of the party platform and incumbent governor Joseph Sayers was easily renominated.

There were several minor parties organizing in the state at the time, including the Prohibition Party which saw its largest convention since 1886.

== General election ==
On election day Sayers won reelection in a landslide with over 67% of the vote, maintaining the Democratic Party's control on the office.

=== Candidates ===
- George Washington Burkett (Republican) (removed from ballot)
- H. G. Damon (Prohibition)
- R. E. Hanney (Republican)
- Jerome Claiborne Kearby, lawyer from Dallas, Populist candidate for governor in 1896, former district attorney of Palestine, candidate for U.S. Representative in 1892 and 1894, major in the 29th Texas Cavalry (Populist) (removed from ballot)
- T. J. McMinn, San Antonio politician (Populist)
- Lee Lightfoot Rhodes, former Populist state representative from Van Zandt County (Social Democratic)
- G. H. Royal, nominee for governor in 1898 (Socialist Labor)
- Joseph D. Sayers, incumbent governor (Democratic)

=== Results ===
1900 Texas gubernatorial election
Party	Candidate	Votes	%	±%
Democratic	Joseph D. Sayers (incumbent)	303,556	67.56%	▼3.53
Republican	R. E. Hanney	112,864	25.12%	N/A
Populist	T. J. McMinn	26,579	5.92%	▼22.15
Socialist Labor	G. H. Royal	155	0.03%	▼0.10
Write-in		6,155 (Note: Although H.G. Damon and L.L. Rhodes were on the ballot, the official results reported theirs as part of the total "scattering" vote.)	1.37%	▲1.35
Total votes		449,309	100.00%	

== Aftermath ==
The election effectively marked the end of the Populist Party's period of being the major opposion to the Democratic Party in the state.

The internal division in the Republican Party between William McDonald and Henry Ferguson, both African Americans, weakened the Black and Tan faction and would lead to the "Lily White" faction of the party being able to take control. The Lily Whites embraced white supremacist policies and the party saw African American influence become greatly diminished for decades.
