= William Yates Atkinson =

American politician

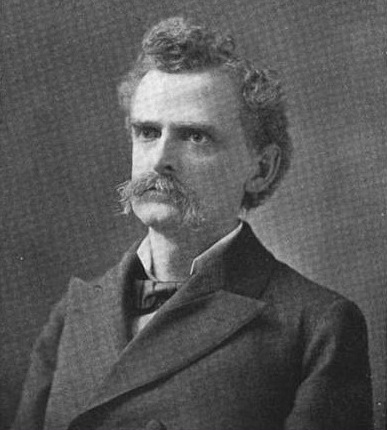
- Atkinson, c. 1898

55th Governor of Georgia
- In office October 27, 1894 – October 29, 1898
- Preceded by: William J. Northen
- Succeeded by: Allen D. Candler

Personal details
- Born: William Yates Atkinson; November 11, 1854 Meriwether County, Georgia, U.S.
- Died: August 8, 1899 (aged 44) Newnan, Georgia, U.S.
- Resting place: Oak Hill Cemetery
- Party: Democratic
- Spouse: Susan Cobb Milton (m. 1880)
- Education: University of Georgia (LL.B.)

William Yates Atkinson (November 11, 1854 – August 8, 1899) was an American politician who served as the 55th governor of Georgia from 1894 to 1898.

== Early life ==
Atkinson was born in the Oakland community in Meriwether County, Georgia, on November 11, 1854. He graduated from the University of Georgia with an LL.B in 1877. He married Susan Cobb Milton, granddaughter of Florida Governor John Milton, in 1880.

== Political life ==
After graduating from the University of Georgia, Atkinson began practicing law in Newnan. Atkinson was the solicitor of the Coweta Superior Court circuit. He then represented Coweta County as a member of the Georgia House of Representatives (1886–94), where he was the speaker, or presiding officer, during the last two years. As a state representative, he introduced a bill that established the Georgia Normal and Industrial College, which later became Georgia College and State University in Milledgeville, Georgia. He was also the Georgia Democratic Party state chair from 1890 to 1892.

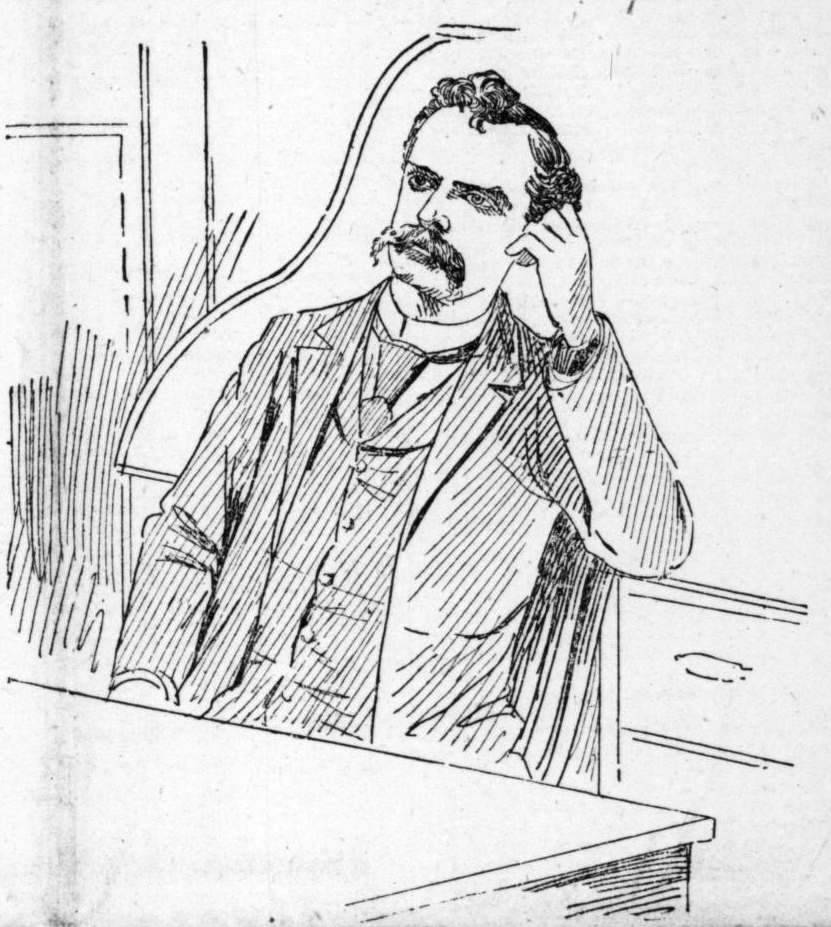
1895 cartoon of Atkinson in The Atlanta Constitution

Atkinson won the 1894 election and was elected Governor of Georgia. He was reelected to a second term in 1896. During his administration, he hired the first woman salaried employee in state government, Helen Dortch, as assistant state librarian. In 1897, he vetoed a law that would have prohibited football in the state, due in part to an impassioned letter from Rosalind Burns Gammon, whose son's death had initiated the anti-football legislation. He was vehement in his opposition to the practice of lynching.

Atkinson was mentioned by William Henry Holtzclaw, later founder of Utica Institute in Mississippi, as giving him the money he needed to go back to Tuskegee Institute for college - as well as a kindly lecture on the advisability of staying out of politics.

After his two terms as governor, Atkinson bravely confronted the mob in the infamous Sam Hose lynching and tried to get them to allow the legal justice system to take its course. He was unsuccessful, however, and Hose was lynched soon after Atkinson confronted the mob.

== Death and legacy ==
Atkinson died on August 8, 1899, at the age of 44. He is buried in Oak Hill Cemetery in Newnan. Atkinson County, Georgia, is named for him.

His son, William Yates Atkinson Jr., was the Georgia Democratic state chair in 1942 as well as a Georgia state Supreme Court justice from 1943 to 1948.

Atkinson Hall, on the campus of Georgia College and State University, is named for him.

== See also ==
- List of speakers of the Georgia House of Representatives

Party political offices
Preceded by William J. Northen	Democratic nominee for Governor of Georgia; 1894, 1896	Succeeded by Allen D. Candler
Political offices
Preceded by William J. Northen	Governor of Georgia; 1894 – 1898	Succeeded by Allen D. Candler
