= 1902 Connecticut gubernatorial election =

- November 4, 1902
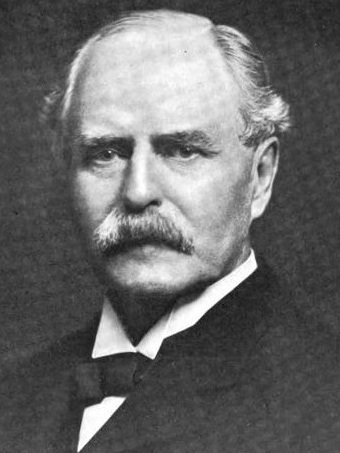

Nominee	Abiram Chamberlain	Melbert B. Cary
Party	Republican	Democratic
Popular vote	85,338	69,330
Percentage	53.44%	43.41%
- Chamberlain: 40–50% 50–60% 60–70% 70–80% 80–90% Cary: 40–50% 50–60% 60–70%
Governor before election
George P. McLean
Republican
Elected Governor
Abiram Chamberlain
Republican

The 1902 Connecticut gubernatorial election was held on November 4, 1902. Republican nominee Abiram Chamberlain defeated Democratic nominee Melbert B. Cary with 53.44% of the vote.

== General election ==
=== Candidates ===
Major party candidates

- Abiram Chamberlain, Republican
- Melbert B. Cary, Democratic

Other candidates

- Francis E. Wheeler, Socialist
- Robert N. Stanley, Prohibition
- Ernest Oatley, Socialist Labor

=== Results ===
1902 Connecticut gubernatorial election
Party	Candidate	Votes	%	±%
Republican	Abiram Chamberlain	85,338	53.44%	
Democratic	Melbert B. Cary	69,330	43.41%	
Socialist	Francis E. Wheeler	2,804	1.76%	
Prohibition	Robert N. Stanley	1,436	0.90%	
Socialist Labor	Ernest Oatley	794	0.50%	
Majority		16,008		
Turnout				
Republican hold		Swing		
