= Henry Roberts (Connecticut politician) =

American politician (1853–1929)

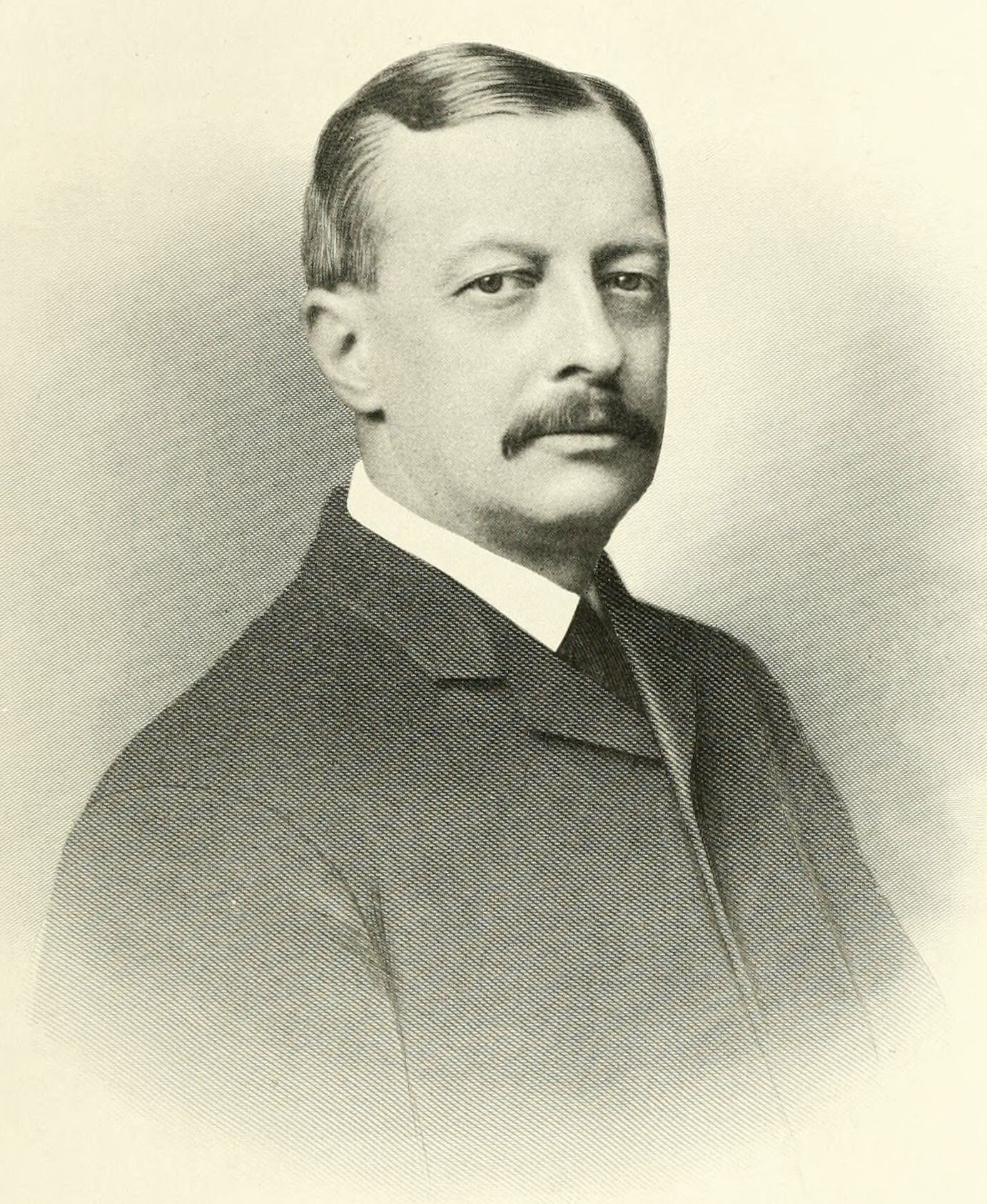

61st Governor of Connecticut
- In office January 4, 1905 – January 9, 1907
- Lieutenant: Rollin S. Woodruff
- Preceded by: Abiram Chamberlain
- Succeeded by: Rollin S. Woodruff

70th Lieutenant Governor of Connecticut
- In office January 7, 1903 – January 4, 1905
- Governor: Abiram Chamberlain
- Preceded by: Edwin O. Keeler
- Succeeded by: Rollin S. Woodruff

Member of the Connecticut Senate
- In office 1901–1902

Member of the Connecticut House of Representatives
- In office 1899

Personal details
- Born: January 22, 1853 Brooklyn, New York, US
- Died: May 1, 1929 (aged 76) Hartford, Connecticut, US
- Party: Republican
- Spouse: Carrie Elizabeth Smith (m. 1881)
- Children: 3
- Education: Yale Law School; Columbia University; Yale University
- Profession: Lawyer, politician

Henry Roberts (January 22, 1853 – May 1, 1929) was an American politician who was the 61st governor of Connecticut.

== Early life ==
Roberts was born in Brooklyn, New York on January 22, 1853, son of George Roberts and Elvira Evans Roberts. He studied at Yale University, where he was on the fourth editorial board of The Yale Record. After graduating from Yale in 1878, he studied one year at Columbia University and in 1879, he was awarded a law degree from Yale Law School.

== Career ==
After completing his education, Roberts practiced law for several years, then entered his father's manufacturing business, the Hartford Woven Wire Mattress Company, and served as company's president from 1886 to 1907. He was also involved in several other business activities.

Roberts became alderman of Hartford, Connecticut in 1897. He became a member of the Connecticut House of Representatives in 1899. He held that position till 1901. He also was a member of the Connecticut Senate from 1901 to 1902. He served as President pro tempore of the Connecticut Senate. He became lieutenant governor of Connecticut in 1903. He held that position till 1905.

Winning the 1904 gubernatorial nomination, Roberts was elected, and became the Governor of Connecticut on January 4, 1905. During his term, several legislations were passed. The bakeries were banned from operating below ground level and a bill was launched that regulated the operation of automobiles. Also enacted during Robert's administration was fortification of the public's safety from fraudulent practices, and the non-support of wives was met with jail sentences.

Roberts left office on January 9, 1907, and returned to his several business activities. He served as president of the Hartford Water Board. He was also a trustee of the Slater Industrial School in North Carolina.

== Personal life and death ==
Roberts married Carrie Elizabeth Smith on October 5, 1881; they had three sons. He was a member of the Society of Colonial Wars and of the Sons of the American Revolution.

He died of respiratory failure at the age of 76 on May 1, 1929, and was interred at Cedar Hill Cemetery in Hartford, Connecticut.

Party political offices
Preceded by Abiram Chamberlain	Republican nominee for Governor of Connecticut; 1904	Succeeded by Rollin S. Woodruff
Political offices
Preceded by Edwin O. Keeler	Lieutenant Governor of Connecticut; 1903–1905	Succeeded by Rollin S. Woodruff
Preceded by Abiram Chamberlain	Governor of Connecticut; 1905–1907	Succeeded by Rollin S. Woodruff
