= James Browning (Texas politician) =

American politician (1850–1921)

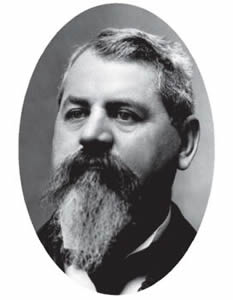
James N. Browning

James Nathan Browning (March 13, 1850 – November 9, 1921) was an American politician and lawyer who served as the 20th lieutenant governor of Texas from 1899 to 1903. He had earlier served as a member of the Texas House of Representatives (1883–89, 1891). A later Lieutenant Governor, Rick Perry, made the following comments when he was sworn in on January 19, 1999.

One hundred years and two days ago, Governor Joseph Sayers and Lieutenant Governor James Browning came to the 11-year-old Capitol building during one of the coldest winters ever recorded in Texas and took the oath of office. The Texans assembled on that day could not have imagined what the 20th century would bring or the role Texans would play in the most American of centuries.

Browning was born in Clark County, Arkansas, and is buried in Amarillo, Texas.

Texas House of Representatives
Preceded by unknown	Member of the Texas House of Representatives from District 43 (Mobeetie); 1883–1889	Succeeded by Alfred Tolar
Preceded by Alfred Tolar	Member of the Texas House of Representatives from District 43 (Clarendon); 1891–1893	Succeeded by Dempsey Jackson
Political offices
Preceded by George T. Jester	Lieutenant Governor of Texas; 1899–1903	Succeeded by George D. Neal
