= George D. Neal =

Lieutenant Governor of Texas from 1903 to 1907

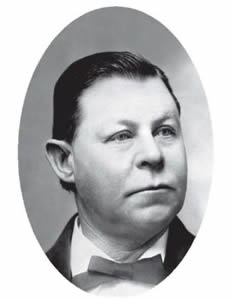

21st Lieutenant Governor of Texas
- In office January 20, 1903 – January 15, 1907
- Governor: S. W. T. Lanham
- Preceded by: James Browning
- Succeeded by: Asbury Bascom Davidson

Member of the Texas Senate from the 15th district
- In office January 12, 1897 – January 13, 1903
- Preceded by: William P. McComb
- Succeeded by: Alred William Morris

Personal details
- Born: October 7, 1853 Amelia Court House, Virginia, U.S.
- Died: July 13, 1916 (aged 62) Navasota, Texas, U.S.
- Party: Democratic
- Spouse: Fannie C. Brooks (m. 1880)
- Children: 2
- Education: Baylor University; University of Texas

George Douglas Neal (October 7, 1853 – July 13, 1916) was an American politician and lawyer who served as the 21st lieutenant governor of Texas from 1903 to 1907. A member of the Democratic Party, he served in the Texas Senate from 1897 to 1903.

== Biography ==
George Douglas Neal was born on October 7, 1853, in Amelia Court House, Virginia to Thomas W. and Elizabeth C. (née Haskins) Neal. In 1866, his family moved to Washington-on-the-Brazos, Texas, where his father began a medical practice. Neal was educated in the common schools of the state before attending Baylor University and the University of Texas.

After briefly serving as a deputy county clerk in Austin County and reading law, he gained admission to the bar in Bellville in 1878. On October 7, 1880, he married Fannie C. Brooks, and they later had two children. He served as county judge of Grimes County from 1884 to 1886 and city attorney of Navasota from 1888 to 1896. Subsequently, Neal served as a member of the Texas Senate for two terms from 1897 to 1903, representing District 15.

Neal was the 21st lieutenant governor of Texas from January 20, 1903, to January 15, 1907. Afterwards, he returned to Navasota and practiced law until his death from a stroke on July 13, 1916.

Texas Senate
Preceded by William P. McComb	Member of the Texas Senate from the 15th district 1897–1903	Succeeded by Alred William Morris
Political offices
Preceded by James Browning	Lieutenant Governor of Texas; 1903–1907	Succeeded by Asbury Bascom Davidson
