= Abiram Chamberlain =

American politician (1837–1911)

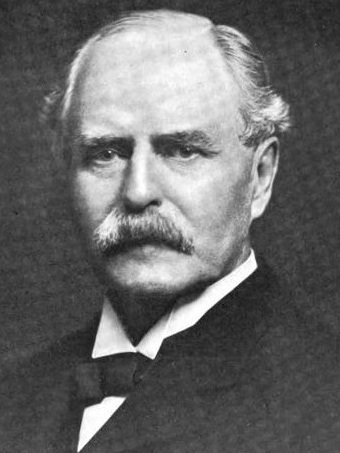

60th Governor of Connecticut
- In office January 7, 1903 – January 4, 1905
- Lieutenant: Henry Roberts
- Preceded by: George P. McLean
- Succeeded by: Henry Roberts

Comptroller of Connecticut
- In office 1901–1903
- Governor: George P. McLean
- Preceded by: Thompson S. Grant
- Succeeded by: William E. Seeley

Member of the Connecticut House of Representatives
- In office 1877-1878

Personal details
- Born: December 7, 1837 Colebrook, Connecticut, U.S.
- Died: May 15, 1911 (aged 73) Meriden, Connecticut, U.S.
- Party: Republican
- Spouse: Charlotte E. Roberts
- Children: Albert R Chamberlain
- Education: Williston Seminary
- Profession: engineer, banker, politician

Abiram Chamberlain (December 7, 1837 – May 15, 1911) was an American politician, and the 60th governor of Connecticut from 1903 to 1905.

== Biography ==
Chamberlain was born in Colebrook, Connecticut on December 7, 1837, son of Abiram Chamberlain and Sophronia Ruth (Burt) Chamberlain. He was a student of civil engineering at the Williston Seminary, in Easthampton, Massachusetts. He was married on November 21, 1872, to Charlotte E. Roberts and they had two children. Chamberlain worked at father's engineering firm for many years.

== Career ==
Chamberlain entered into banking and at the age of thirty, in 1867, he was elected Cashier of the Home National Bank of Meriden and moved to that city. In 1881 he was elected president of that bank and served as president of the New Britain National Bank in 1881. He also served as vice president of the Meriden Savings Bank.

Entering into politics in the 1870s, as a member of the Meriden city council, Chamberlain also served as a member of the Connecticut House of Representatives from 1877 to 1878, and was Connecticut's state comptroller from 1901 to 1902.

Chamberlain won the 1902 Republican gubernatorial nomination, and was elected Connecticut's 43rd governor. During his tenure, he signed legislation that sanctioned the establishment of the Connecticut State Police, and he endorsed laws that assisted workers.

On February 1, 1903, he became the first Connecticut governor to deploy the National Guard against strikers, as part his response to the Waterbury Trolley Strike of 1903. His response to station 17 infantry companies and two Gatling gun sections for four days in the city was criticized by Waterbury Mayor Edward G. Kilduff. Regarding the criticism, Chamberlain told the Hartford Courant that "The mayor thought we had sent more troops than necessary but I told him I didn't think so. When it came up to the state to act I proposed to do so in a way that would have a strong moral effect. While we didn't send the troops there to kill anyone it would have been useless to send a company or two there." On January 4, 1905, Chamberlain left office and retired from public service. He returned to his various business interests in Meriden.

== Death ==
Chamberlain died on May 15, 1911. He is interred at Walnut Grove Cemetery, Meriden, New Haven County, Connecticut.

Party political offices
Preceded by George P. McLean	Republican nominee for Governor of Connecticut; 1902	Succeeded by Henry Roberts
Political offices
Preceded by George P. McLean	Governor of Connecticut; 1903–1905	Succeeded by Henry Roberts
