= 1953 in the United States =

- Decades: 1930s; 1940s; 1950s; 1960s; 1970s
- See also: History of the United States (1945–1964); Timeline of United States history (1950–1969); List of years in the United States

Events from the year 1953 in the United States.

== Incumbents ==
=== Federal government ===
- President:

Harry S. Truman (D-Missouri) (until January 20)
Dwight D. Eisenhower (R-Kansas/New York) (starting January 20)

- Vice President:

Alben W. Barkley (D-Kentucky) (until January 20)
Richard Nixon (R-California) (starting January 20)

- Chief Justice:

Fred M. Vinson (Kentucky) (died September 8)
Earl Warren (California) (starting October 5)

- Speaker of the House of Representatives:

Sam Rayburn (D-Texas) (until January 3)
Joseph William Martin Jr. (R-Massachusetts) (starting January 3)

- Senate Majority Leader:

Ernest McFarland (D-Arizona) (until January 3)
Robert A. Taft (R-Ohio) (January 3 – July 31)
William F. Knowland (R-California) (starting August 3)

- Congress: 82nd (until January 3), 83rd (starting January 3)

==== State governments ====
Governors and lieutenant governors

=== Governors ===
- Governor of Alabama: Gordon Persons (Democratic)
- Governor of Arizona: John Howard Pyle (Republican)
- Governor of Arkansas: Sid McMath (Democratic) (until January 13), Francis Cherry (Democratic) (starting January 13)
- Governor of California: Earl Warren (Republican) (until October 5), Goodwin Jess Knight (Republican) (starting October 5)
- Governor of Colorado: Daniel I. J. Thornton (Republican)
- Governor of Connecticut: John Davis Lodge (Republican)
- Governor of Delaware: Elbert N. Carvel (Democratic) (until January 20), J. Caleb Boggs (Republican) (starting January 20)
- Governor of Florida:
  - until January 6: Fuller Warren (Democratic)
  - January 6-September 28: Daniel T. McCarty (Democratic)
  - starting September 28: Charley Eugene Johns (Democratic)
- Governor of Georgia: Herman Talmadge (Democratic)
- Governor of Idaho: Len Jordan (Republican)
- Governor of Illinois: Adlai E. Stevenson II (Democratic) (until January 12), William G. Stratton (Republican) (starting January 12)
- Governor of Indiana: Henry F. Schricker (Democratic) (until January 12), George N. Craig (Republican) (starting January 12)
- Governor of Iowa: William S. Beardsley (Republican)
- Governor of Kansas: Edward F. Arn (Republican)
- Governor of Kentucky: Lawrence W. Wetherby (Democratic)
- Governor of Louisiana: Robert F. Kennon (Democratic)
- Governor of Maine:
  - until January 6: Burton M. Cross (Republican)
  - January 6-7: Nathaniel M. Haskell (Republican)
  - starting January 7: Burton M. Cross (Republican)
- Governor of Maryland: Theodore R. McKeldin (Republican)
- Governor of Massachusetts: Paul A. Dever (Democratic) (until January 8), Christian A. Herter (Republican) (starting January 8)
- Governor of Michigan: G. Mennen Williams (Democratic)
- Governor of Minnesota: C. Elmer Anderson (Republican)
- Governor of Mississippi: Hugh L. White (Democratic)
- Governor of Missouri: Forrest Smith (Democratic) (until January 12), Phil M. Donnelly (Democratic) (starting January 12)
- Governor of Montana: John W. Bonner (Democratic) (until January 5), J. Hugo Aronson (Republican) (starting January 5)
- Governor of Nebraska: Val Peterson (Republican) (until January 8), Robert B. Crosby (Republican) (starting January 8)
- Governor of Nevada: Charles H. Russell (Republican)
- Governor of New Hampshire: Sherman Adams (Republican) (until January 1), Hugh Gregg (Republican) (starting January 1)
- Governor of New Jersey: Alfred E. Driscoll (Republican)
- Governor of New Mexico: Edwin L. Mechem (Republican)
- Governor of New York: Thomas Dewey (Republican)
- Governor of North Carolina: W. Kerr Scott (Democratic) (until January 8), William B. Umstead (Democratic) (starting January 8)
- Governor of North Dakota: Clarence Norman Brunsdale (Republican)
- Governor of Ohio: Frank J. Lausche (Democratic)
- Governor of Oklahoma: Johnston Murray (Democratic)
- Governor of Oregon: Paul L. Patterson (Republican)
- Governor of Pennsylvania: John S. Fine (Republican)
- Governor of Rhode Island: Dennis J. Roberts (Democratic)
- Governor of South Carolina: James Francis Byrnes (Democratic)
- Governor of South Dakota: Sigurd Anderson (Republican)
- Governor of Tennessee: Gordon Browning (Democratic) (until January 15), Frank G. Clement (Democratic) (starting January 15)
- Governor of Texas: Allan Shivers (Democratic)
- Governor of Utah: J. Bracken Lee (Republican)
- Governor of Vermont: Lee E. Emerson (Republican)
- Governor of Virginia: John S. Battle (Democratic)
- Governor of Washington: Arthur B. Langlie (Republican)
- Governor of West Virginia: Okey L. Patteson (Democratic) (until January 19), William C. Marland (Democratic) (starting January 19)
- Governor of Wisconsin: Walter J. Kohler Jr. (Republican)
- Governor of Wyoming: Frank A. Barrett (Republican) (until January 3), Clifford Joy Rogers (Republican) (starting January 3)

=== Lieutenant governors ===
- Lieutenant Governor of Alabama: James B. Allen (Democratic)
- Lieutenant Governor of Arkansas: Nathan Green Gordon (Democratic)
- Lieutenant Governor of California: Goodwin Knight (Republican) (until October 5), Harold J. Powers (Republican) (starting October 5)
- Lieutenant Governor of Colorado: Gordon L. Allott (Republican)
- Lieutenant Governor of Connecticut: Edward N. Allen (Republican)
- Lieutenant Governor of Delaware: Alexis I. du Pont Bayard (Democratic) (until January 20), John W. Rollins (Democratic) (starting January 20)
- Lieutenant Governor of Georgia: Marvin Griffin (Democratic)
- Lieutenant Governor of Idaho: Edson H. Deal (Republican)
- Lieutenant Governor of Illinois: Sherwood Dixon (Democratic) (until January 12), John William Chapman (Republican) (starting January 12)
- Lieutenant Governor of Indiana: John A. Watkins (Democratic) (until January 12), Harold W. Handley (Republican) (starting January 12)
- Lieutenant Governor of Iowa: William H. Nicholas (Republican) (until month and day unknown), Leo Elthon (Republican) (starting month and day unknown)
- Lieutenant Governor of Kansas: Fred Hall (Republican)
- Lieutenant Governor of Kentucky: Emerson Beauchamp (political party unknown)
- Lieutenant Governor of Louisiana: C. E. "Cap" Barham (Democratic)
- Lieutenant Governor of Massachusetts: Charles F. Sullivan (Democratic) (until January 8), Sumner G. Whittier (Republican) (starting January 8)
- Lieutenant Governor of Michigan: William C. Vandenberg (Republican) (until January 1), Clarence A. Reid (Republican) (starting January 1)
- Lieutenant Governor of Minnesota:
  - until month and day unknown: vacant
  - month and day unknown: Ancher Nelsen (Republican)
  - starting month and day unknown: vacant
- Lieutenant Governor of Mississippi: Carroll Gartin (Democratic)
- Lieutenant Governor of Missouri: James T. Blair Jr. (Democratic)
- Lieutenant Governor of Montana: Paul Cannon (Democratic) (until month and day unknown), George M. Gosman (Republican) (starting month and day unknown)
- Lieutenant Governor of Nebraska: Charles J. Warner (Republican)
- Lieutenant Governor of Nevada: Clifford A. Jones (Democratic)
- Lieutenant Governor of New Mexico: Tibo J. Chavez (Democratic)
- Lieutenant Governor of New York:
  - until September 30: Frank C. Moore (Republican)
  - September 30-October 1: Arthur H. Wicks (Republican)
  - October 1-December 31: Walter J. Mahoney (Republican)
- Lieutenant Governor of North Carolina: Hoyt Patrick Taylor (Democratic) (until January 8), Luther H. Hodges (Democratic) (starting January 8)
- Lieutenant Governor of North Dakota: Ray Schnell (Republican) (until month and day unknown), Clarence P. Dahl (Republican) (starting month and day unknown)
- Lieutenant Governor of Ohio: George D. Nye (Democratic) (until January 12), John William Brown (Republican) (starting January 12)
- Lieutenant Governor of Oklahoma: James E. Berry (Democratic)
- Lieutenant Governor of Pennsylvania: Lloyd H. Wood (Republican)
- Lieutenant Governor of Rhode Island: John S. McKiernan (Democratic)
- Lieutenant Governor of South Carolina: George Bell Timmerman Jr. (Democratic)
- Lieutenant Governor of South Dakota: Rex A. Terry (Republican)
- Lieutenant Governor of Tennessee: Walter M. Haynes (Democratic) (until January 15), Jared Maddux (Democratic) (starting January 15)
- Lieutenant Governor of Texas: Ben Ramsey (Democratic)
- Lieutenant Governor of Vermont: Joseph B. Johnson (Republican)
- Lieutenant Governor of Virginia: Allie Edward Stokes Stephens (Democratic)
- Lieutenant Governor of Washington: Victor A. Meyers (Democratic) (until January 14), Emmett T. Anderson (Republican) (starting January 14)
- Lieutenant Governor of Wisconsin: George M. Smith (Republican)

== Events ==
=== January–March ===
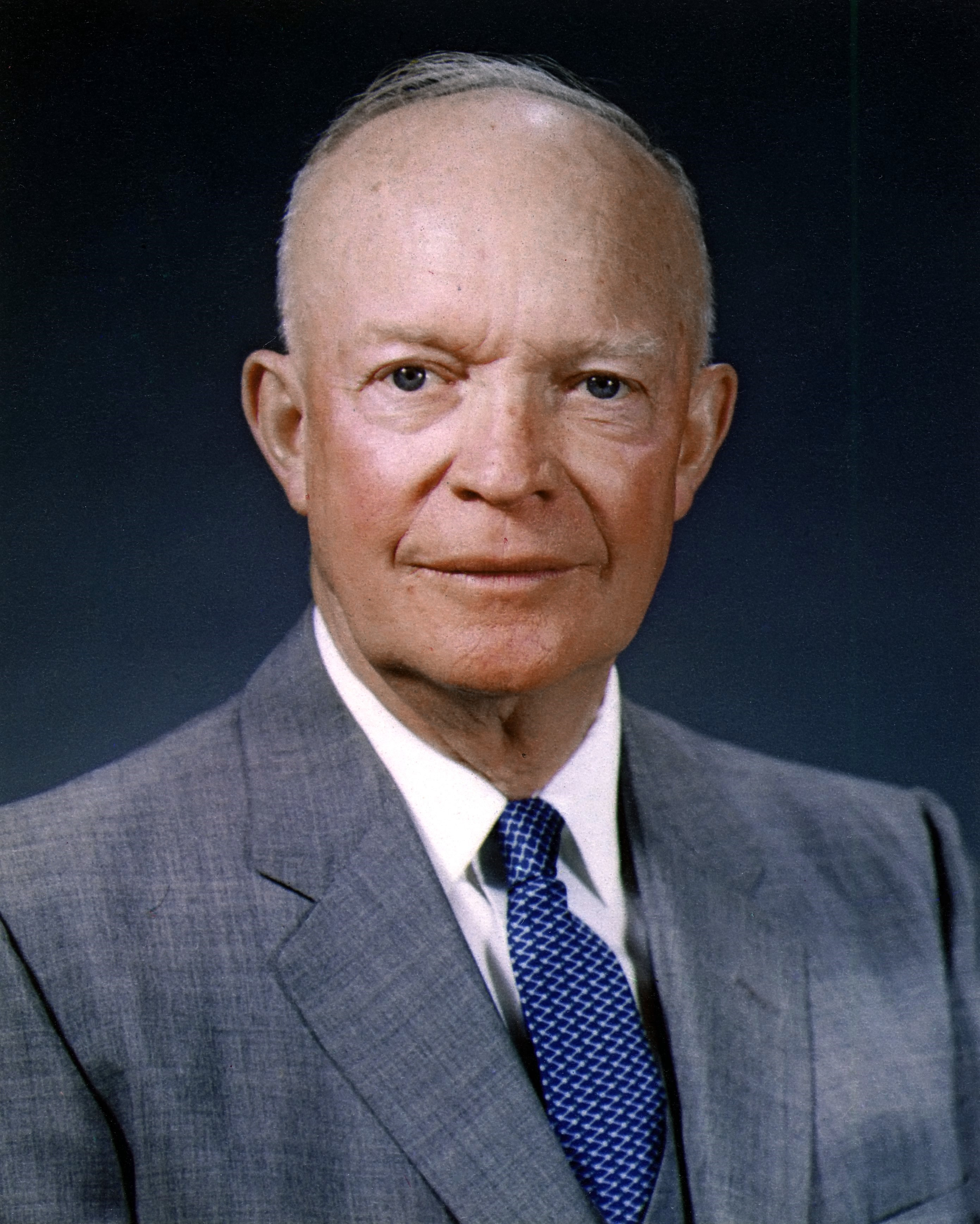
January 20: Dwight D. Eisenhower becomes the 34th U.S. president

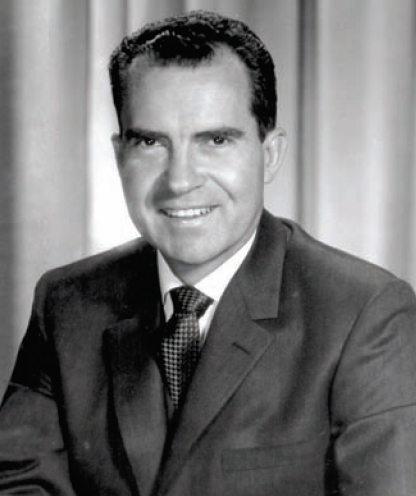
Richard Nixon becomes the 36th U.S. vice president

- January 7 – President Harry S. Truman announces the United States has developed a hydrogen bomb.
- January 14 – The CIA-sponsored Robertson Panel first meets to discuss the UFO phenomenon.
- January 19 – 68% of all television sets in the United States are tuned into I Love Lucy to watch Lucille Ball give birth.
- January 20 – Dwight D. Eisenhower is sworn in as the 34th president of the United States, and Richard Nixon is sworn in as the 36th vice president.
- January 22 – The Crucible, a historical drama by Arthur Miller written as an allegory of McCarthyism, opens on Broadway.
- February 5 – Walt Disney's 14th animated film, Peter Pan, premieres in Chicago. It is Disney's final film to be distributed by RKO.
- February 11 – President Dwight D. Eisenhower refuses a clemency appeal for Ethel and Julius Rosenberg.
- February 13 – Transsexual Christine Jorgensen returns to New York after successful sexual reassignment surgery in Denmark.
- February 19 – Georgia approves the first literature censorship board in the U.S.
- March 17 – The first nuclear test of Operation Upshot–Knothole is conducted in Nevada, with 1,620 spectators at 3.4 km (2.1 mi).
- March 19 – The 25th Academy Awards ceremony, emceed by Conrad Nagel, is simultaneously held at RKO Pantages Theatre in Hollywood, Los Angeles (hosted by Bob Hope) and at NBC International Theatre in New York (hosted by Fredric March). It is the first ceremony to be televised. Cecil B. DeMille's The Greatest Show on Earth wins Best Motion Picture, while Fred Zinnemann's High Noon, John Huston's Moulin Rouge and John Ford's The Quiet Man all receive the most nominations with seven, with Ford receiving his third Best Director win. Vincente Minnelli's The Bad and the Beautiful wins the most awards with five.
- March 31 – Due to increasingly lower ridership, Staten Island Rapid Transit closes two of its three-passenger lines (South Beach & North Shore).

=== April–June ===
- April 11 – The Department of Health, Education, and Welfare begins operations, the first new Cabinet-level department since the Department of Labor's formation in 1913.
- May 11 – The 1953 Waco tornado outbreak: an F5 tornado hits in the downtown section of Waco, Texas, killing 114.
- May 25 – Nuclear testing: at the Nevada Test Site, the United States conducts its first and only nuclear artillery test: Upshot–Knothole Grable.
- June 8 – Flint–Worcester tornado outbreak sequence: a tornado kills 115 in Flint, Michigan (the last to claim more than 100 lives).
- June 9
  - CIA Technical Services Staff head Sidney Gottlieb approves of the use of LSD in a MKULTRA subproject.
  - Flint–Worcester tornado outbreak sequence: a tornado spawned from the same storm system as the Flint tornado hits in Worcester, Massachusetts, killing 94.
- June 19
  - Julius and Ethel Rosenberg are executed at Sing Sing Prison in New York for conspiracy to commit espionage.
  - The Baton Rouge bus boycott begins in the Southern United States.
- June 30 – Assembly of the first Chevrolet Corvette is completed in Flint, Michigan.

=== July–September ===
- July 18 – Howard Hawks's musical film Gentlemen Prefer Blondes, starring Marilyn Monroe and Jane Russell, is released by 20th Century Fox.
- July 26 – The Short Creek raid is carried out on a polygynous Mormon sect in Arizona.
- July 27 – The Korean War ends: The United States, the People's Republic of China, North Korea and South Korea sign an armistice agreement.
- July 28 – Burger King opens its first restaurant in Jacksonville, Florida.
- August 5 – Operation Big Switch: U.S. prisoners of war are repatriated after the Korean War.
- August 17 – The first planning session of Narcotics Anonymous is held in Southern California. Its first meeting is held October 5.
- August 18 – The second Kinsey Report, Sexual Behavior in the Human Female, on American sexual habits, is issued.
- August 19 – Cold War: 1953 Iranian coup d'état ("Operation Ajax") – The CIA helps to overthrow the democratic government of Mohammed Mossadegh in Iran and retain Shah Mohammad Reza Pahlavi on the throne.
- August 20 – The U.S. returns to West Germany 382 ships it had captured during World War II.
- September 9 – The Supreme Court decision in Rumely v. United States affirms that indirect lobbying in the U.S. by distribution of books intended to influence opinion is a public good and not subject to regulation by Congress.
- September 12 – U.S. Senator John Fitzgerald Kennedy marries Jacqueline Lee Bouvier at St. Mary's Church in Newport, Rhode Island.
- September 28 – Six year old boy Bobby Greenlease is kidnapped in Kansas City, Missouri and murdered in Lenexa, Kansas, despite his father paying the largest ever ransom payment in American history at the time.

=== October–December ===
- October 5
  - Earl Warren is appointed Chief Justice of the United States by U.S. president Dwight D. Eisenhower.
  - The New York Yankees defeat the Brooklyn Dodgers, 4 games to 2, to win their 16th World Series title in baseball.
- October 10 – Mutual Defense Treaty Between the United States and the Republic of Korea is concluded in Washington D.C.
- October 12 – The play The Caine Mutiny Court-Martial opens at Plymouth Theatre, New York.
- October 15 – Tito Jackson, member of the Jacksons and brother of Michael Jackson is born.
- October 19 – Fahrenheit 451, by Ray Bradbury, is published
- October 30 – Cold War: U.S. President Dwight D. Eisenhower formally approves the top secret document of the United States National Security Council NSC 162/2, which states that the United States' arsenal of nuclear weapons must be maintained and expanded to counter the communist threat.
- December – Hugh Hefner publishes the first issue of Playboy magazine: it sells 54,175 copies at $.50 each.
- December 6 – With the NBC Symphony Orchestra, conductor Arturo Toscanini performs what he claims is his favorite Beethoven symphony, Eroica, for the last time. The live performance is broadcast nationwide on radio, and later released on records and CD.
- December 8 – U.S. president Dwight D. Eisenhower delivers his Atoms for Peace address to the UN General Assembly in New York City.
- December 18 – Carl Hall and Bonnie Brown are both executed in the Missouri gas chamber after pleading guilty to the Murder and kidnapping of six year old Bobby Greenlease; she is the third woman in history (and last until 2021) to be executed by federal authorities.
- December 25 – Amami Islands are returned to Japan after 8 years of United States Military occupation.

=== Date unknown ===
- Harold Butler and his first partner open Danny's Donuts (later Denny's) in Lakewood, California.
- Swanson introduce the TV dinner.

=== Ongoing ===
- Cold War (1947–1991)
- Second Red Scare (1947–1957)
- Korean War (1950–1953)

== Births ==
=== January ===
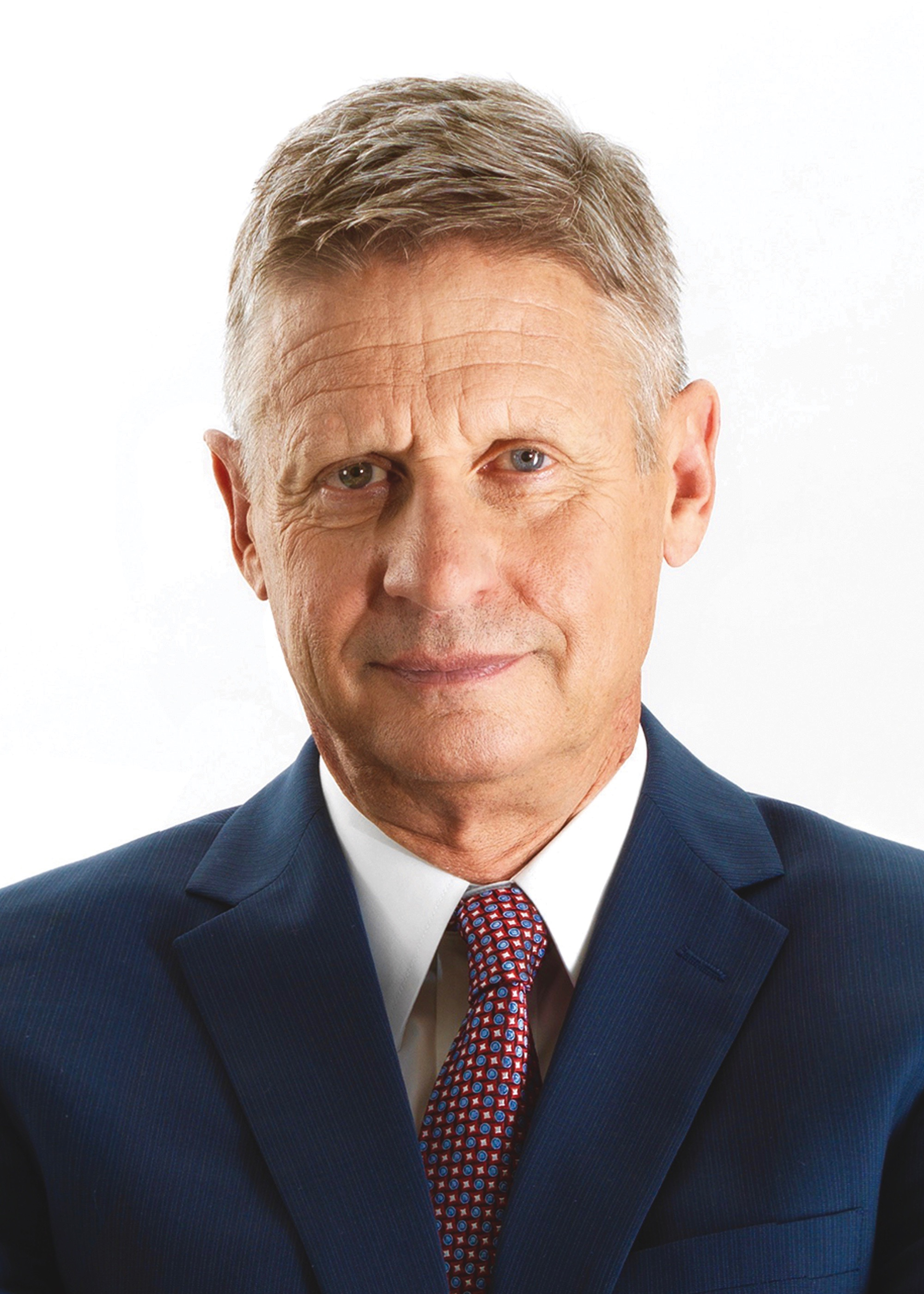
Gary Johnson

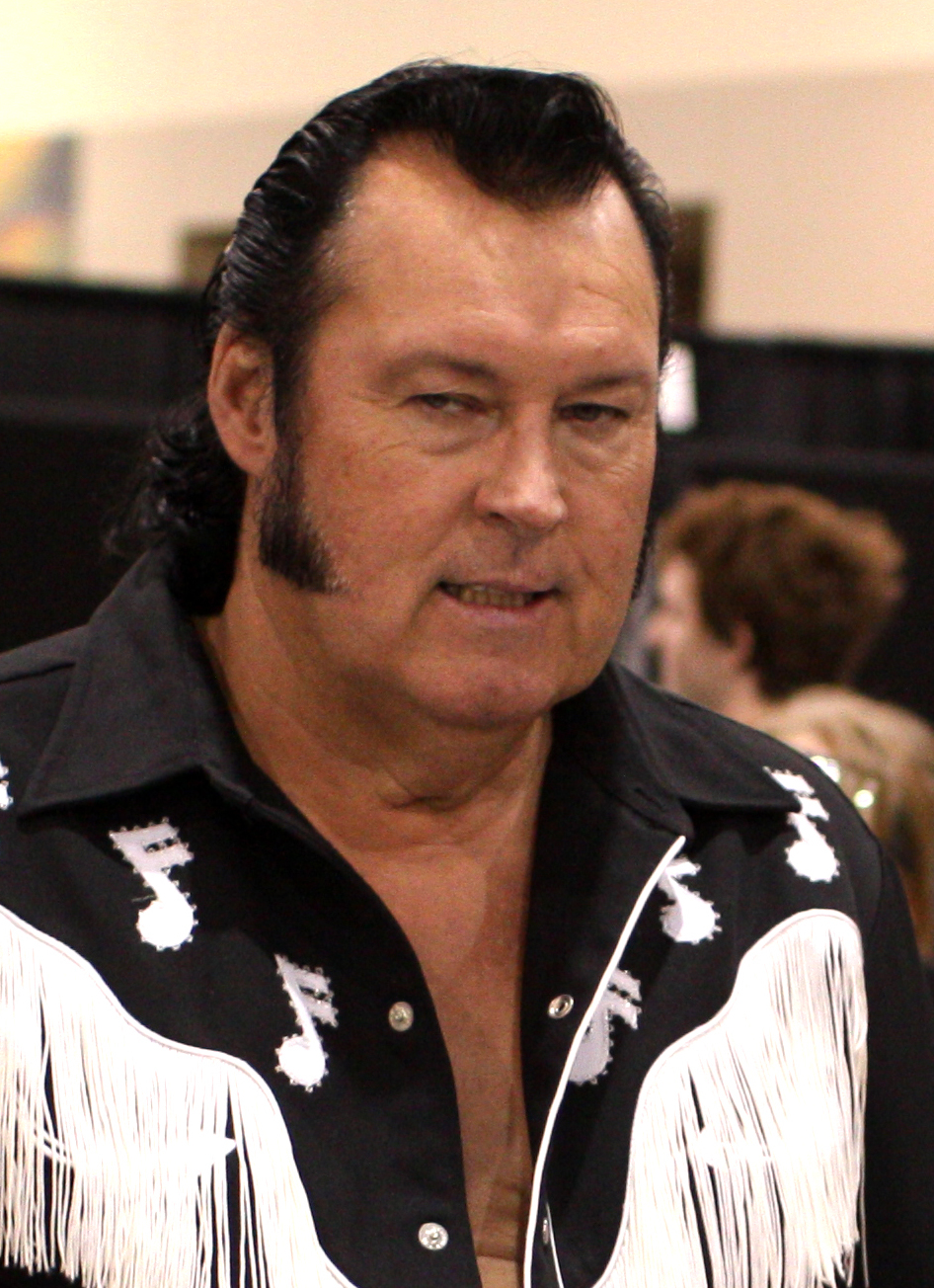
The Honky Tonk Man

- January 1
  - Gary Johnson, 29th governor of New Mexico, Libertarian Party nominee for President.
  - Lynn Jones, baseball player and coach
- January 2 – Vincent Racaniello, virologist, author and academic
- January 4 – James Warren, journalist and publisher
- January 5 – Steve Archer, singer-songwriter and producer
- January 6 – Danny Pearson, singer (died 2018)
- January 8 – Bruce Sutter, baseball pitcher (died 2022)
- January 11 – Jim Clendenen, winemaker (died 2021)
- January 13 – Luann Ryon, archer (died 2022)
- January 15
  - Kent Hovind, Christian fundamentalist evangelist and tax protester
  - Randy White, American football player
- January 17 – Mark Littell, baseball player (died 2022)
- January 19 – Desi Arnaz Jr., actor and musician
- January 20 – Jeffrey Epstein, financier and sex offender (died 2019)
- January 21
  - Paul Allen, entrepreneur and co-founder of Microsoft (died 2018)
  - Glenn Kaiser, Christian blues-rock, heavy metal and R&B singer-songwriter and guitarist
- January 23 – Robin Zander, singer and guitarist (Cheap Trick)
- January 24
  - Tim Stoddard, baseball player and coach
  - Matthew Wilder, musician
- January 25 – The Honky Tonk Man, pro wrestler
- January 29
  - Nate Barnett, basketball player
  - Caesar Cervin, soccer player and coach
  - Dennis Delaney, actor and playwright
  - Paul Fusco, puppeteer and voice actor
  - Steve March-Tormé, singer-songwriter
  - Louie Pérez, singer-songwriter and guitarist
  - Dwight Takamine, lawyer and politician
  - Charlie Wilson, singer-songwriter; producer (The Gap Band)

=== February ===
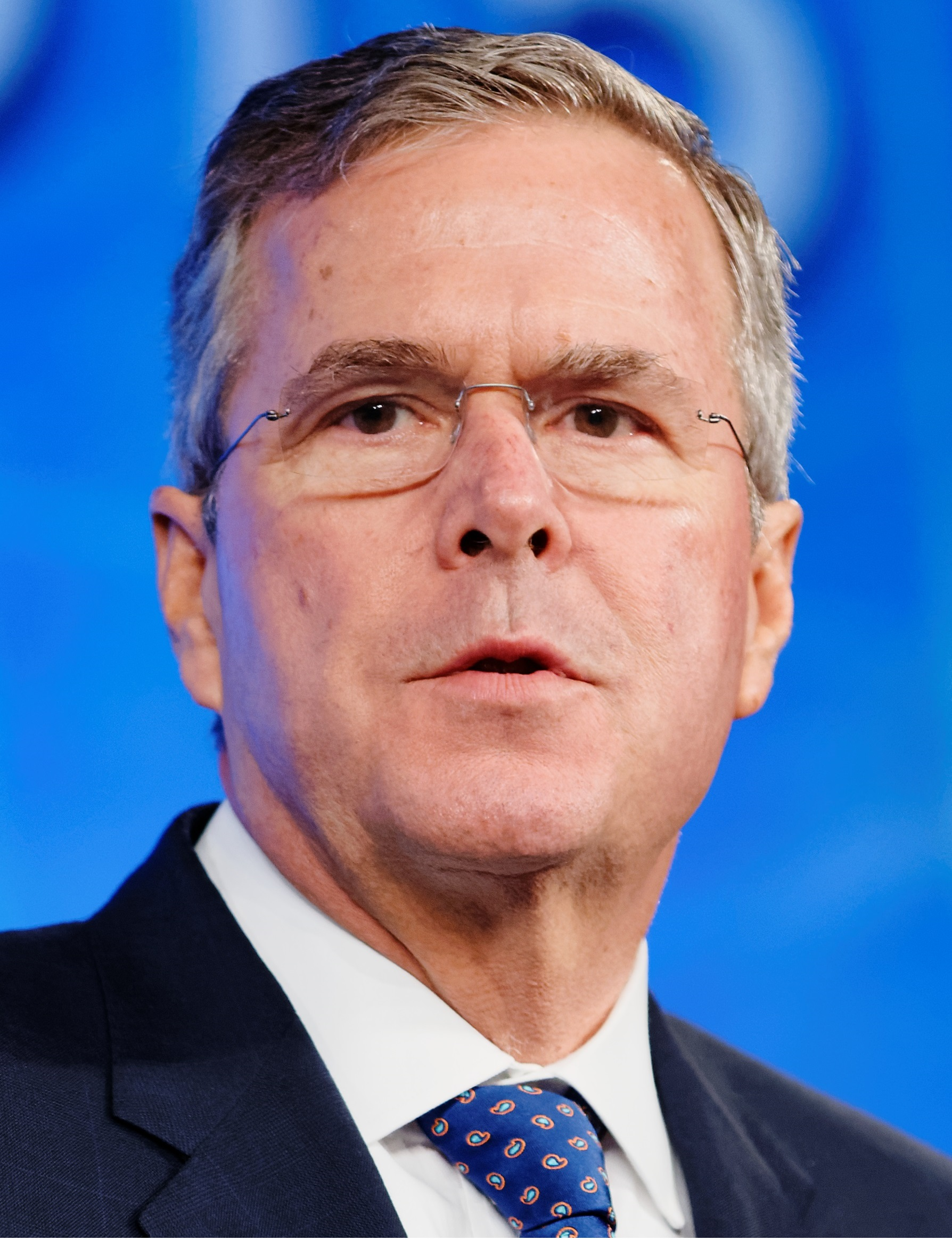
Jeb Bush

- February 3 – Ron Williamson, baseball player wrongly convicted of rape and murder (died 2004)
- February 7 – Dan Quisenberry, baseball player and poet (died 1998)
- February 8 – Mary Steenburgen, American actress
- February 11 – Jeb Bush, 43rd governor of Florida from 1999 to 2007, second son of President George H. W. Bush and Barbara Bush; younger brother of President George W. Bush
- February 14 – Martha Raddatz, news reporter
- February 15 – John Goodsall, guitarist (died 2022)
- February 19 – Herb Lusk, American football player (died 2022)
- February 28 – Ricky Steamboat, pro wrestler

=== March ===
- March 1 – Luther Strange, U.S. Senator from Alabama from 2017 to 2018
- March 2 – Russ Feingold, U.S. Senator from Wisconsin from 1993 to 2011
- March 4 – Kay Lenz, actress
- March 5 – Michael Sandel, political philosopher
- March 6 – Jacklyn Zeman, actress (died 2023)
- March 13 – Michael Curry, presiding bishop of the Episcopal Church from 2015
- March 23 – Chaka Khan, singer-songwriter
- March 24 – Louie Anderson, stand-up comedian (died 2022)
- March 26 – Lincoln Chafee, U.S. Senator from Rhode Island from 1999 to 2007

=== April ===
- April 2 – Rosemary Bryant Mariner, naval aviator (died 2019)
- April 3 – Russ Francis, American football player (died 2023)
- April 9
  - Hal Ketchum, country singer-songwriter (died 2020)
  - Stephen Paddock, mass murderer (died 2017)
- April 16
  - Douglas M. Fraser, general
  - Jay O. Sanders, actor
  - J. Neil Schulman, author, actor, director and producer (died 2019)
- April 19 – Ruby Wax, broadcaster and comedian
- April 20 – Carrie Mae Weems, photographer
- April 26
  - Brian Binnie, naval officer and test pilot (died 2022)
  - Linda Thompson, lawyer and conspiracy theorist (died 2009)

=== May ===
- May 3 – Gary Young, drummer (died 2023)
- May 12 – Kevin Grevey, basketball player and sportscaster
- May 13 – Lisa Lyon, bodybuillder (died 2023)
- May 15 – George Brett, baseball player
- May 26
  - Kay Hagan, U.S. Senator from North Carolina from 2009 to 2015 (died 2019)
  - Dan Roundfield, basketball player (died 2012)
- May 29
  - Dennis Franks, footballer (died 2021)
  - Big Daddy Graham, comedian and radio host (died 2021)
  - Philip E. Sakowitz Jr., public official

=== June ===
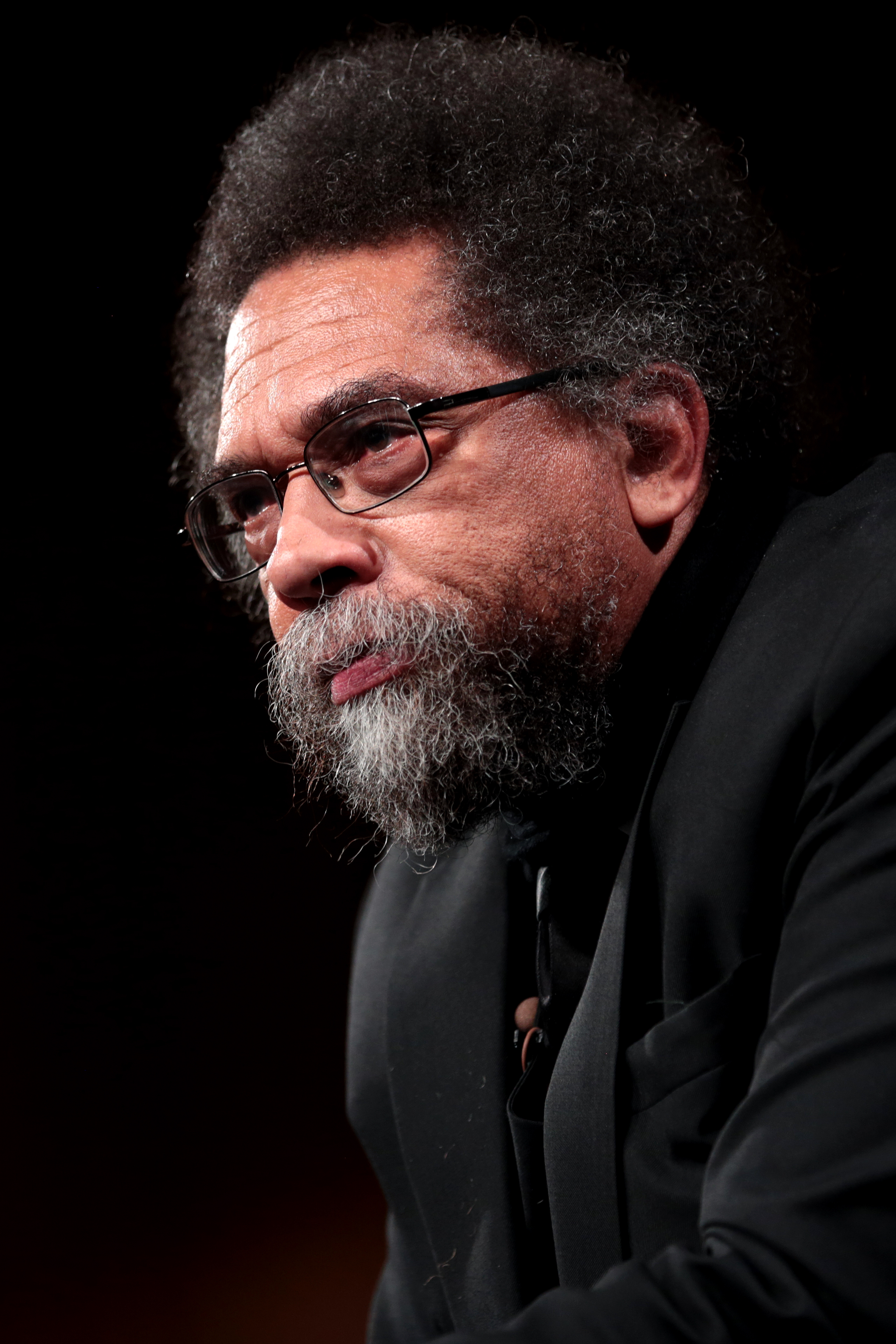
Cornel West

- June 1 – David Berkowitz, serial killer
- June 2 – Cornel West, philosopher and political activist
- June 10
  - John Edwards, U.S. Senator from North Carolina from 1999 to 2005
  - Fulton Kuykendall, American football player (died 2024)
- June 11 – Barbara Minty, model
- June 13 – Tim Allen, comedian, actor, voice-over artist and entertainer
- June 18 – Bruce Seals, basketball player (died 2020)
- June 22 – Cyndi Lauper, American singer

=== July ===
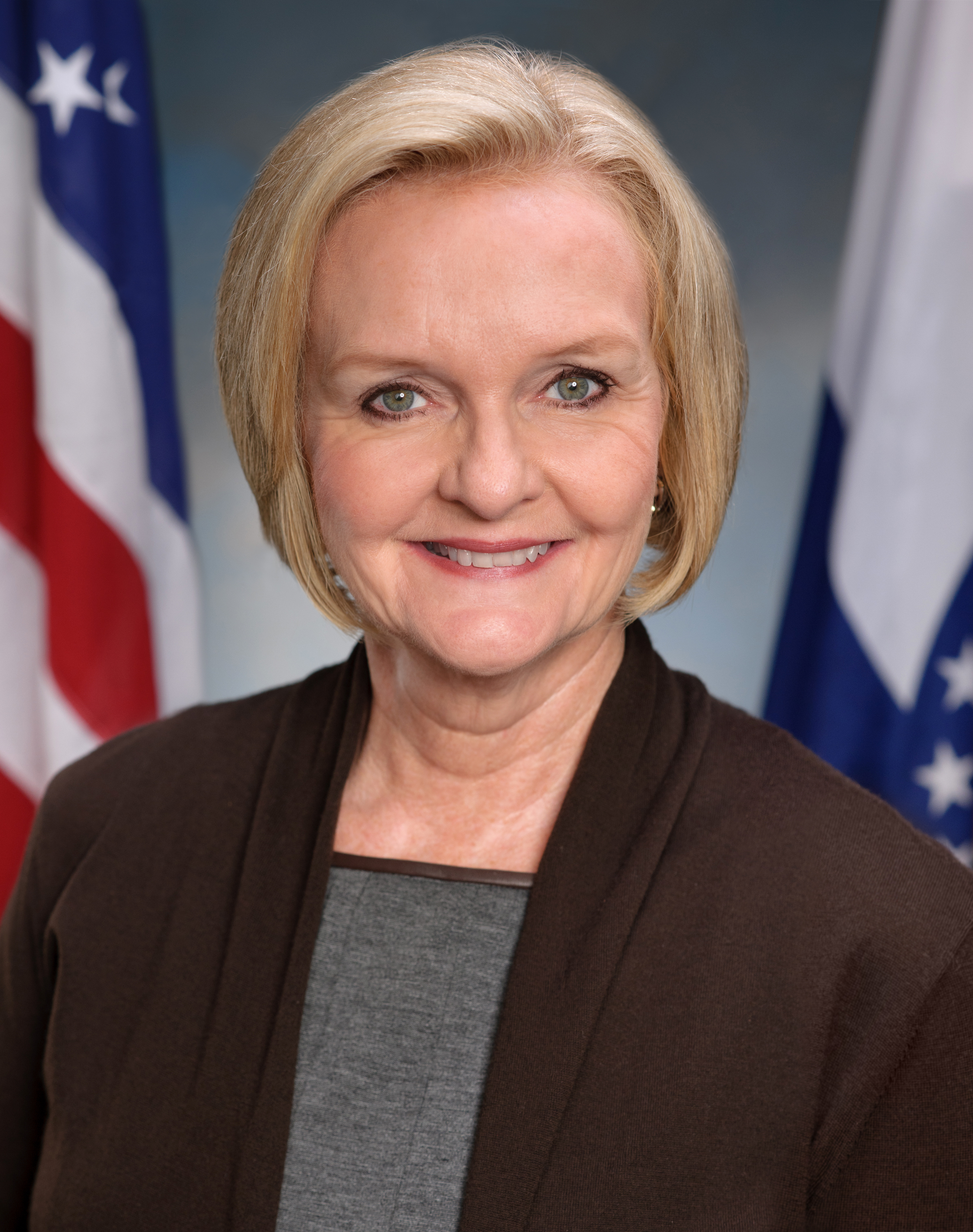
Claire McCaskill

- July 6
  - Nanci Griffith, country folk singer-songwriter (died 2021)
  - Mike Riley, football head coach
- July 11 – Mindy Sterling, actress
- July 15 – Alvin Neelley, murderer (died 2005)
- July 19 – Howard Schultz, Starbucks CEO
- July 24 – Claire McCaskill, U.S. Senator from Missouri from 2007 to 2019
- July 28 – Don Black, white supremacist
- July 29
  - Joanne Bland, civil rights activist (died 2026)
  - Tim Gunn, author

=== August ===
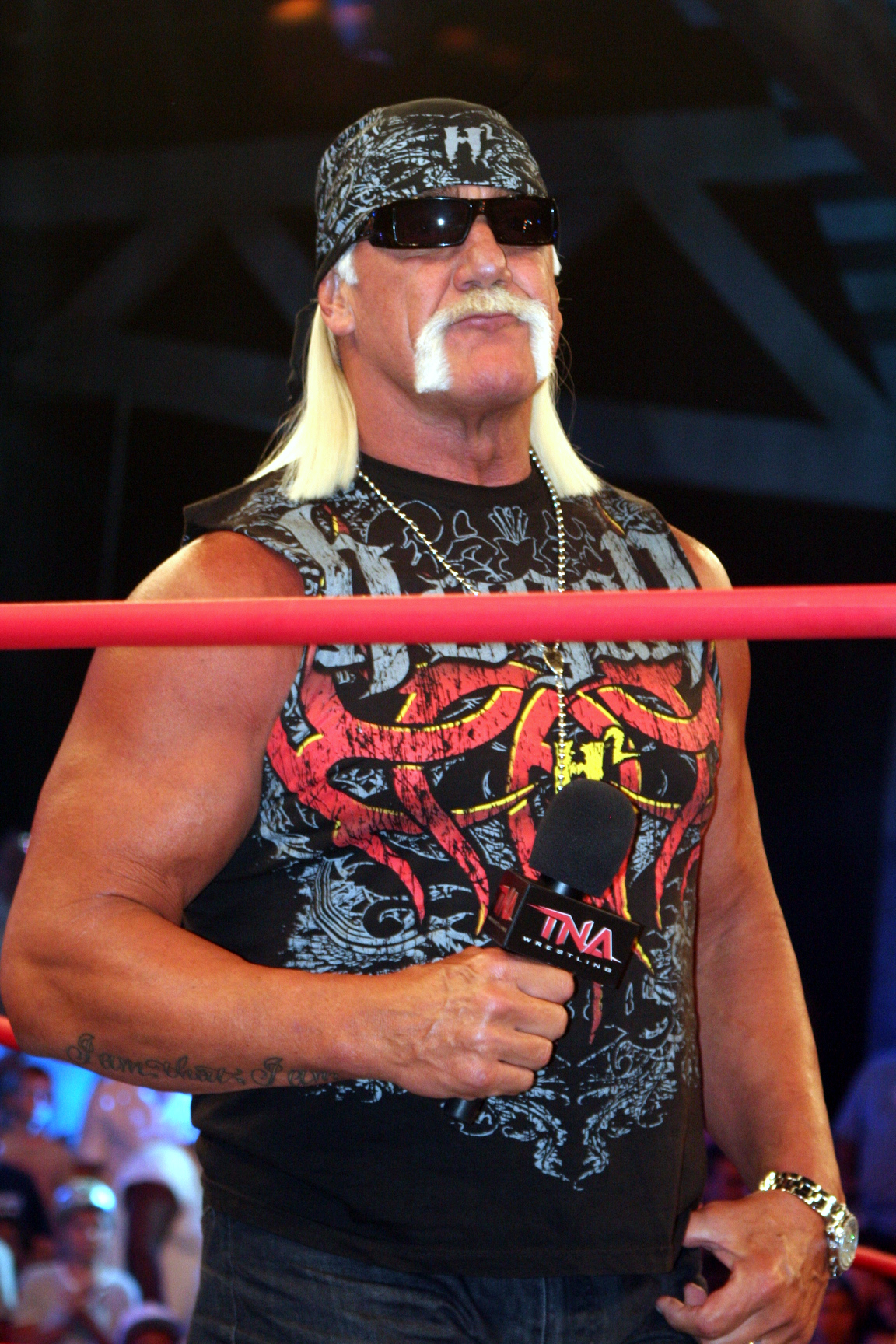
Hulk Hogan

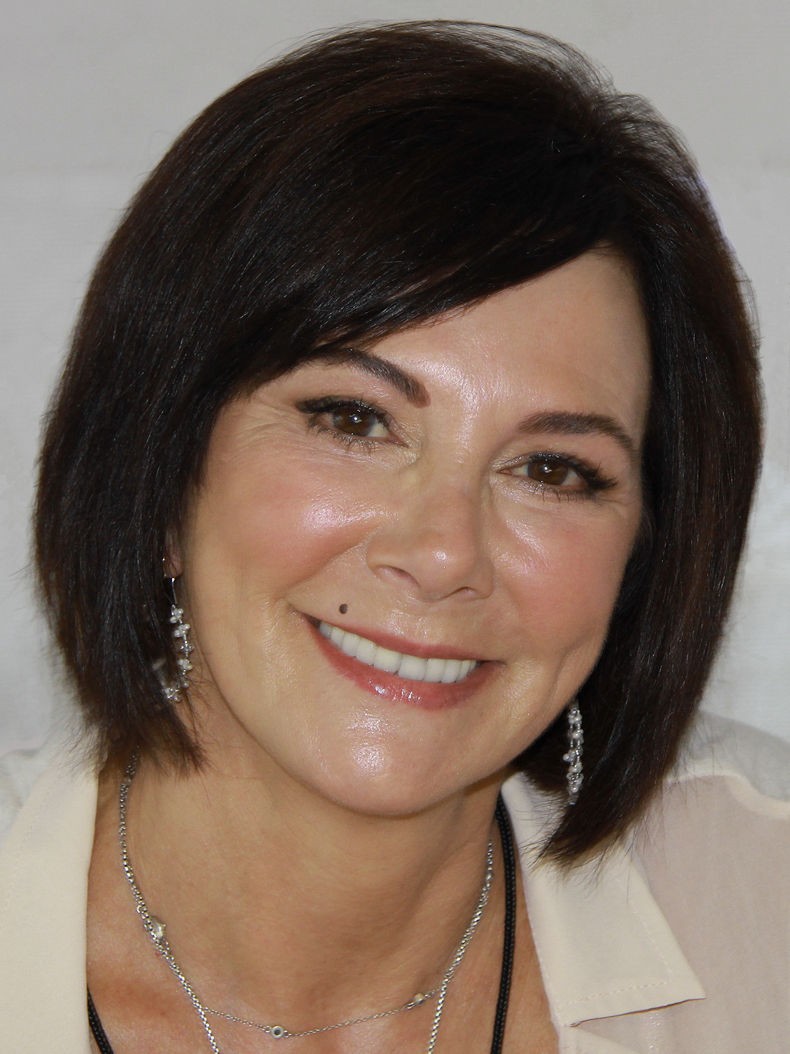
Marcia Clark

- August 1
  - Robert Cray, blues guitarist and singer
  - Steven Krasner, sports journalist
- August 8 – Don Most, actor and director
- August 11
  - Diane Coleman, disability rights activist (died 2024)
  - Hulk Hogan, professional wrestler (died 2025)
- August 17 – Columba Bush, philanthropist
- August 19 – Mary Matalin, political consultant
- August 29 – David Boaz, philosopher (died 2024)
- August 31 – Marcia Clark, prosecutor

=== September ===
- September 2 – John Zorn, musician
- September 4 – Lawrence Hilton-Jacobs, African-American actor
- September 6 – Anne Lockhart, actress
- September 8 – Stu Ungar, poker player (d. 1998)
- September 11
  - Tommy Shaw, guitarist and singer
  - Lesley Visser, sportscaster and journalist
- September 13 – Iyanla Vanzant, author and motivational speaker
- September 17 – Junior Bridgeman, African-American basketball player and businessman (d. 2025)
- September 19 – Jennifer Kilian, American-Dutch translator
- September 21 – Andrew Heermans, musician, recording engineer and music producer
- September 24 – Peter Halley, painter and educator
- September 30 – Deborah Allen, singer

=== October ===
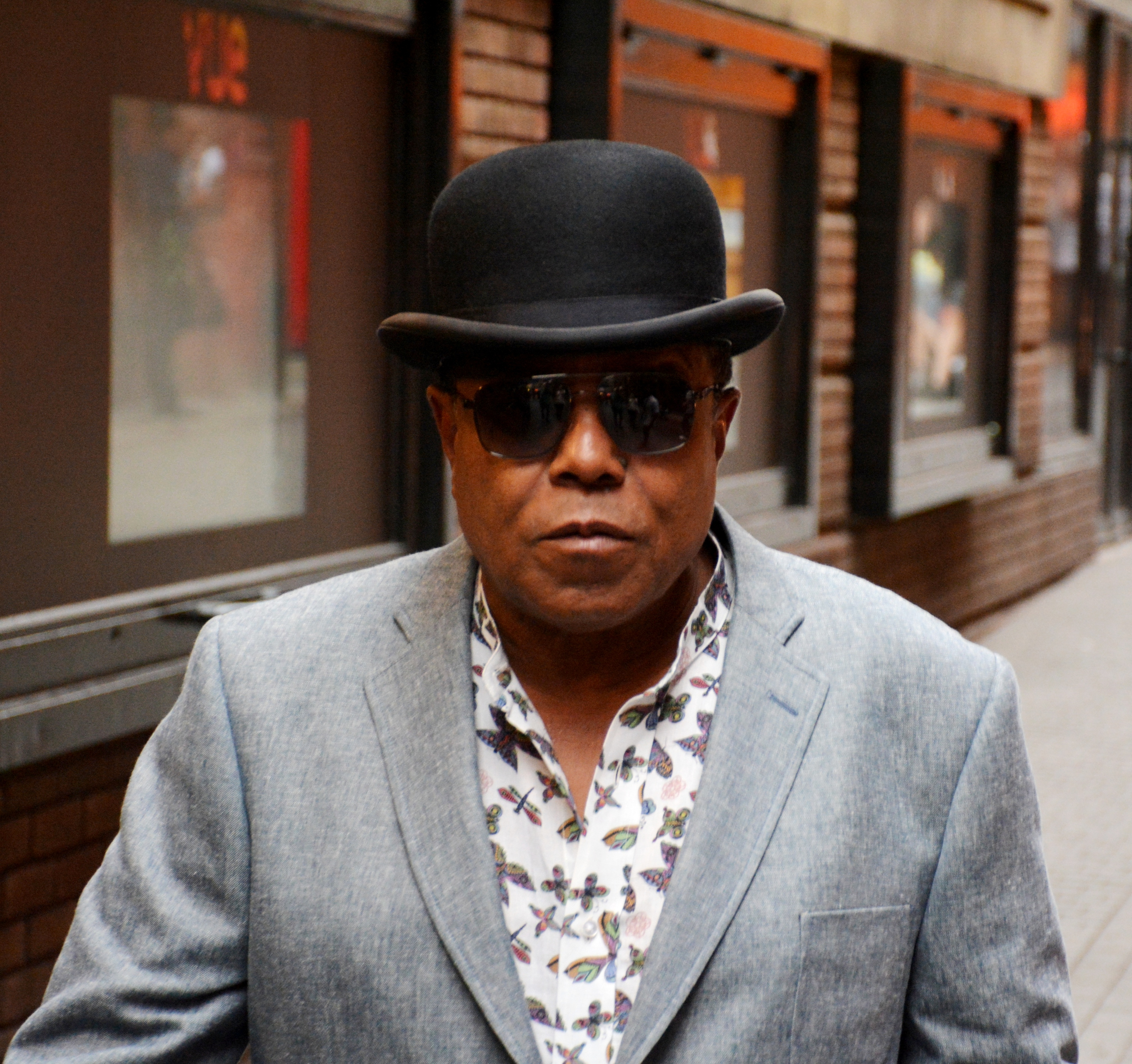
Tito Jackson

- October 9 – Tony Shalhoub, actor
- October 15
  - Tito Jackson, singer-songwriter and guitarist (died 2024)
  - Larry Miller, actor and screenwriter
- October 19 – Conrad Murray, physician and convict
- October 20 - Bill Nunn, actor (died 2016)
- October 24 – Steven Hatfill, physician and virologist
- October 25 – Ajamu Baraka, human rights activist and the Green Party's nominee for Vice President of the United States in the 2016 election
- October 27 – U. L. Washington, baseball player (died 2024)
- October 28
  - Desmond Child, songwriter and producer
  - Walter Jon Williams, author

=== November ===
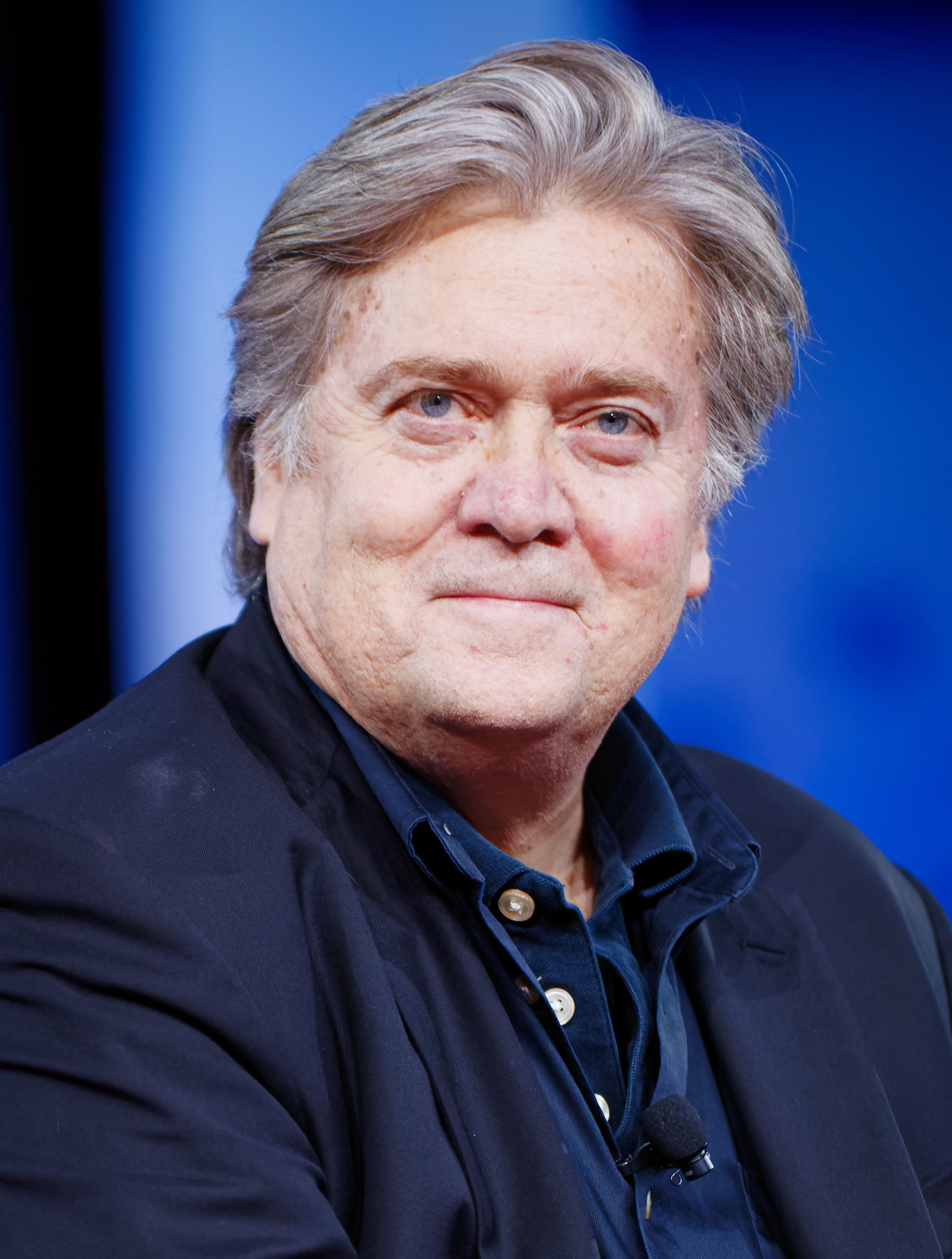
Steve Bannon

- November 3
  - Kate Capshaw, American actress
  - Dennis Miller, comedian and television host
- November 14 – Phil Baron, voice actor, puppeteer and songwriter
- November 15 – James Widdoes, actor, director and producer
- November 18 - Kevin Nealon, comedian
- November 25 – Katherine Zappone, human rights activist and independent politician in the Republic of Ireland
- November 27 – Steve Bannon, media executive and political strategist

=== December ===
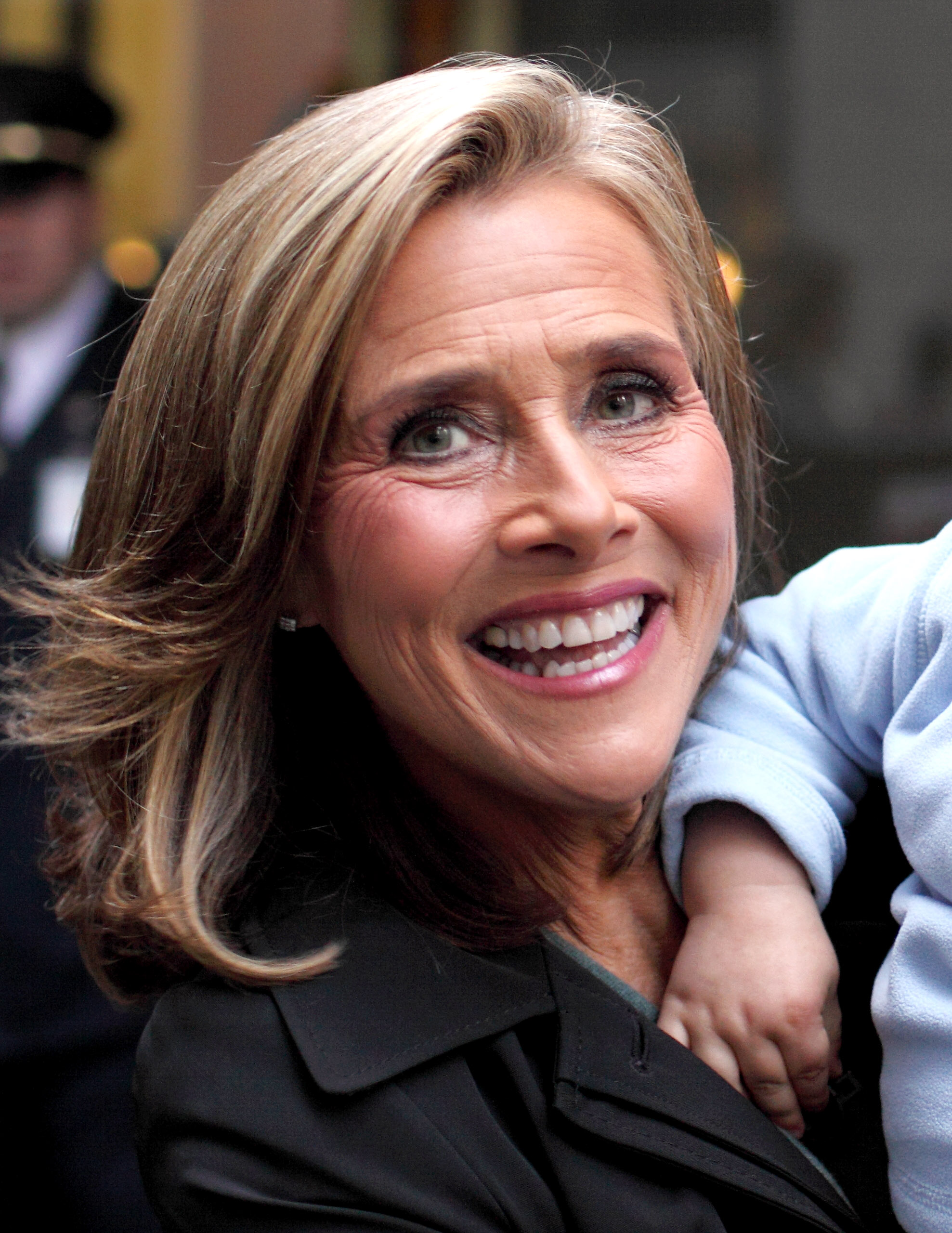
Meredith Vieira

- December 2 – Joel Fuhrman, physician and nutritionist
- December 6
  - Tom Hulce, actor
  - Dwight Stones, high jumper and sportscaster
  - Gary Ward, baseball player and coach
- December 8 – Kim Basinger, actress
- December 9 – John Malkovich, actor
- December 10 – Chris Bury, journalist and academic
- December 20 – Glenn Bujnoch, American football player (died 2023)
- December 17 – Bill Pullman, actor
- December 22
  - David Leisner, guitarist and composer
  - Bern Nadette Stanis, African-American actress
- December 27 – Sheila Dixon, Democratic mayor of Baltimore and criminal
- December 30
  - Dana Key, Christian musician, guitarist and preacher (died 2010)
  - Meredith Vieira, journalist and game show host

== Deaths ==
- January 1 – Hank Williams, country singer-songwriter (born 1923)
- January 7 – Osa Johnson, adventurer and filmmaker, wife of Martin Johnson (born 1894)
- March 12 – James Hard, last verified living Union combat veteran of the American Civil War (born 1842)
- May 30 – Dooley Wilson, African American actor, singer and drummer (born 1886)
- June 3 – Florence Price, African American classical composer (born 1887)
- June 5
  - William Farnum, actor (born 1876)
  - Bill Tilden, tennis player (born 1893)
- June 20 – Arthur Caesar, screenwriter (born 1892)
- July 11 – Oliver Campbell, tennis player (born 1871)
- July 22 – Cy Kendall, actor (born 1898)
- August 7 – Abner Powell, Major League Baseball player (born 1860)
- August 19 – Willie Love, Delta blues pianist (born 1906)
- August 22 – Jim Tabor, Major League Baseball player (born 1916)
- September 2 – Jonathan M. Wainwright, general (born 1883)
- September 5
  - Francis Ford, actor and director (born 1881)
  - Rudolf Höber, German-American physician (born 1873)
- September 8 – Fred M. Vinson, Chief Justice of the U.S. (born 1890)
- September 13 – Mary Brewster Hazelton, portrait painter (born 1868)
- September 28 – Edwin Hubble, astronomer (born 1889)
- September 29 – Milt Gross, comic book illustrator and animator (born 1895)
- October 3 – Florence R. Sabin, medical scientist (born 1871)
- October 11 – Pauline Robinson Bush, younger sister of US President George W. Bush (born 1949)
- November 18 – Ruth Crawford Seeger, modernist composer and folk music arranger (born 1901)
- November 21 – Larry Shields, dixieland jazz clarinetist (born 1893)
- November 27 – Eugene O'Neill, playwright (born 1888)
- December 14 – Marjorie Kinnan Rawlings, novelist (born 1896)
- December 19 – Robert Andrews Millikan, physicist Nobel Prize laureate (born 1868)
- December 21 – Nicholas H. Heck, geophysicist, oceanographer and surveyor (born 1882)
- December 29 – Violet MacMillan, Broadway theater actress (born 1887)
- Unknown – Edward Joseph Renehan Sr., banker (born 1893)

== See also ==
- List of American films of 1953
- Timeline of United States history (1950–1969)
