= Barnett Rubin =

American political scientist (born 1950)

- Born: January 10, 1950 (age 76); Philadelphia, Pennsylvania

Education
- Education: University of Chicago (MA, PhD); Ecole des Hautes Etudes en Sciences Sociales; Yale University (BA)

Philosophical work
- Institutions: New York University; Columbia University; Yale University
- Main interests: Political Science

Barnett Richard Rubin (born January 10, 1950) is an American political scientist and a leading expert on Afghanistan and South Asia. He is the author of eight books and is currently senior fellow and director at the Center on International Cooperation at New York University, a leading foreign policy center. He was previously senior advisor to the US special representative for Afghanistan and Pakistan. He has advised the United Nations, NATO, the United States, and the Afghan government on numerous policy matters, including aid policy, security policy, and diplomatic strategy.

== Early life and education ==
Raised in the Philadelphia, Pennsylvania, area, he received his BA in history from Yale University and his MA and PhD in political science from the University of Chicago in 1982. He also received a Fulbright Fellowship to study at the Ecole des Hautes Etudes en Sciences Sociales in Paris in 1977–1978.

He is fluent in English, French, and Hebrew, and intermediate in Arabic, Persian, and German.

== Professional work ==
Rubin is director of studies and senior fellow at the Center on International Cooperation (CIC) of New York University, where has worked since July 2000. From April 2009 until October 2013, he was the senior adviser to the special representative of for Afghanistan and Pakistan at the US Department of State.

Between 1994 and 2000, he served as director of the Center for Preventive Action and Director, Peace, and Conflict Studies at New York City's Council on Foreign Relations.

He was associate professor of political science and director of the Center for the Study of Central Asia at Columbia University from 1990 to 1996. Previous to this, he was a Jennings Randolph Peace Fellow at the United States Institute of Peace and assistant professor of political science at Yale University.

In November–December 2001 Rubin served as special advisor to the UN special representative of the secretary general for Afghanistan during the negotiations that led to the Bonn Agreement. He advised the United Nations on the drafting of the constitution of Afghanistan, the Afghanistan Compact, and the Afghanistan National Development Strategy.

Between 1996 and 1998, he served on the US secretary of state's Advisory Committee on Religious Freedom Abroad.

== Works ==
=== Books ===
- Afghanistan in the Post-Cold War Era. Oxford University Press. 9 May 2013. ISBN 978-0-19-979112-5.
- The Fragmentation of Afghanistan: State Formation and Collapse in the International System. Yale University Press. January 2002. ISBN 978-0-300-09519-7.
- Blood on the Doorstep: The Politics of Preventive Action, Century Foundation Press, 2002 ISBN 9780870784736
- Peter Lewis; Pearl T. Robinson; Barnett R. Rubin (1998). Stabilizing Nigeria: Sanctions, Incentives, and Support for Civil Society. Council on Foreign Relations. pp. 4–. ISBN 978-0-87078-415-6.
- Toward Comprehensive Peace in Southeast Europe: Conflict Prevention in the South Balkans, Twentieth Century Fund Press, 1996. ISBN 9780870784026, OCLC 924817850
- The Search for Peace in Afghanistan: From Buffer State to Failed State. Yale University Press. 1 January 1995. ISBN 978-0-300-06376-9.

=== Also in other publications ===
- Susanne Hoeber Rudolph, Lloyd I. Rudolph, editors, "The U.S. Response to the JVP Insurgency in Sri Lanka," Coordination of Complexity in South Asia: A Study for the Commission on the Organization of the Government for the Conduct of Foreign Policy (Washington, D.C.: U.S. Government Printing Office.) Reprinted in Lloyd I. Rudolph and Susanne Hoeber Rudolph, editors, The Regional Imperative: The Administration of U.S. Foreign Policy Towards South Asian States under Presidents Johnson and Nixon (New Delhi: Concept Publishing Co., 1980).
- "Statistical Evaluation of Human Rights Violations: Implications for Policy," In U.S. Foreign Policy and Human Rights, Paula Newberg, editor, (New York: New York University Press, 1980).
- Feudal Revolt and State Building: The 1938 Sikar Agitation in Jaipur State (Delhi: South Asia Publications, 1983).
- "Economic Liberalisation and the Indian State," Third World Quarterly 7 (October 1985), pp. 942–957.
- "Journey to the East: Industrialization in India and the Chinese Experience," in Dilip K. Basu and John Richard Sisson, eds. Social and Economic Development in India: A Reassessment (New Delhi: SAGE Publications, 1985), pp. 67–88.
- "Afghan Resistances," Third World Affairs 1986. (London: Third World Foundation for Social and Economic Studies, 1986), pp. 468–472.
- "Financing Gross Capital Formation in the Indian Public Sector: A Quantitative Model," Economic and Political Weekly (November 1–8, 1986), pp. 1943–1950.
- "The Civil Liberties Movement in India: New Approaches to the State and Social Change." Asian Survey (March 1987), pp. 371–392.
- "India," in International Handbook of Human Rights, Jack Donnelly and Rhoda Howard, eds. (New York: Greenwood Press, 1987), pp. 135–160.
- "Human Rights in Afghanistan." In Rosanne Klass, editor, Afghanistan: The Great Game Revisited (New York: Freedom House, 1987), pp. 288–305.
- With Jeri Laber. A Nation Is Dying: Afghanistan Under the Soviets. Evanston, Illinois: Northwestern University Press, 1988.
- "Lineages of the State in Afghanistan," Asian Survey 28 (November 1988), pp. 1188–1209.
- With Patricia Gossman, "Accounting for 'Disappearances' in Sri Lanka: An Excerpt from an Asia Watch Report," South Asia Bulletin 8 (1988), pp. 75–87.
- "Afghanistan after Geneva: The Next Round," Orbis 33 (Winter 1988–1989), pp. 57–72.
- "Human Rights and Development: Reflections on Social Movements in India," in Human Rights and Development: International Views, ed. David Forsythe (London: Macmillan, 1989), pp. 110 – 118.
- "Human Rights in Mass-Based Ethnic Conflict : South Asian Examples of Dilemmas of Definition, Monitoring and Protection," in Claude E. Welch, Jr., and Virginia A. Leary, eds., Asian Perspectives on Human Rights (Boulder: Westview, 1990), pp. 186–205.
- "Afghanistan: 'Back to Feudalism,'" Current History (December 1989), pp. 421–424+.
- "Afghanistan: Political Exiles in Search of A State." Journal of Political Science 18 (Spring 1990), pp. 63–93; also in Yossi Shain, ed., Governments in Exile.(New York: Routledge: 1991).
- "The Fragmentation of Afghanistan," Foreign Affairs (Winter 1989/90), pp. 150–168.
- "The Old Regime in Afghanistan: Recruitment and Training of a State Elite," Central Asian Survey 10 (1991).
- "Political Elites in Afghanistan: Rentier State Building, Rentier State Wrecking," International Journal of Middle East Studies 24 (1992), pp. 77–99.
- "Post-Cold-War State Disintegration: The Failure of International Conflict Resolution in Afghanistan," Journal of International Affairs 46 (Winter 1993), pp. 469–492.
- "Redistribution and the State in Afghanistan: The Red Revolution Turns Green," in Ali Banuazizi and Myron Weiner, eds., The Politics of Social Transformation in Afghanistan, Iran, and Pakistan (Syracuse: Syracuse University Press, 1994): 187–227.
- "The Fragmentation of Tajikistan," Survival 35 (Winter 1993–1994): 71–91.
- "Contradictory Trends in the International Relations of Central Asia," Central Asia Monitor no. 6 (1993): 11–16.
- "Afghanistan in 1993," Asian Survey 34 (February 1994): 185–90.
- "Tajikistan: From Soviet Republic to Russian-Uzbek Protectorate," in Michael Mandelbaum, ed., Central Asia and the World: Kazakhstan, Uzbekistan, Tajikistan, Kyrgyzstan, and Turkmenistan (New York: Council on Foreign Relations, 1994): 207–24.
- "The Failure of an Internationally Sponsored Interim Government in Afghanistan," in Yossi Shain and Juan Linz, eds., Between States: Interim Governments and the Transition to Democracy (Cambridge: Cambridge University Press, 1995): 211–236.
- “Post-Colonial State Formation and Post-Cold-War State Disintegration,” in International Solidarity and National Sovereignty, pp. 39–66. Edited by Giandomenico Picco and Giovanni Delli Zotti. Gorizia: Istituto de Sociologia Internazionale, 1995.
- “Afghanistan: The Forgotten Crisis,” in Refugee Survey Quarterly, v. 15, n. 2 (1996), pp. 1–35. Also published as “Afghanistán: La Crisis Olvidada,” in Informe: Observatorio de conflictos 5 (1996), published by Centro de Investigación para la Paz (Madrid).
- “U.S. Policy in Afghanistan,” in Muslim Politics Report, 11 (Council on Foreign Relations, January/February 1997).
- “Central Asia: Problems of Wealth, A Wealth of Problems,” in 1997 Freedom Review Around the World, v. 28, n. 1 (1997), pp. 77–90.
- “Women and Pipelines: Afghanistan's Proxy Wars,” in International Affairs 73, no. 2 (April 1997), pp. 283–296.
- "Afghanistan," in Tom Barry and Martha Homey, eds., Global Focus: A New Foreign Policy Agenda 1997-1998 (Albuquerque, New Mexico: Interhemispheric Resource Center, 1997), pp. 195–198.
- "Arab Islamists in Afghanistan," in John L. Esposito, ed., Political Islam: Revolution, Radicalism, or Reform? (Boulder, Colorado: Lynne Reinner, 1997), pp. 179–206.
- “Russian Hegemony and State Breakdown in the Periphery: Causes and Consequences of the Civil War in Tajikistan,” in Barnett R. Rubin and Jack Snyder, eds., Organizing the Former Soviet Space: Origins of Political Order and Conflict (London: Routledge, 1998).
- "Conclusion: Managing Normal Instability," in Barnett R. Rubin and Jack Snyder, eds., Organizing the Former Soviet Space: Origins of Political Order and Conflict (London: Routledge, 1998).
- "Introduction: Experiences in Prevention," in Barnett R. Rubin, ed., Cases and Strategies for Preventive Action (New York: The Council on Foreign Relations and The Twentieth Century Fund, 1998).
- With Michael S. Lund and Fabienne Hara, "Learning from Burundi’s Failed Democratic Transition, 1993-96: Did International Initiatives Match the Problem?," in Barnett R. Rubin, ed., Cases and Strategies for Preventive Action (New York: Twentieth Century Fund, 1998), pp. 47–92.
- "Afghanistan under the Taliban," Current History 98 (February 1999), pp. 79–91.
- "Prévention des conflits: l'Europe et les leçons de l'expérience." In Robert Bussière, ed., L'Europe et la prévention des crises (Paris: L'Harmattan, 2000).
- "Afghanistan: The Last Cold-War Conflict, the First Post-Cold War Conflict." In Wayne Nafziger, Frances Stewart, and Raimo Väyrinen (eds), The Origins of Humanitarian Emergencies (Vol 2). Oxford: Oxford University Press, 1999 or 2000.
- "The Political Economy of War and Peace in Afghanistan," World Development 28 (2000), no. 10, pp. 1789–1803.
- With Ashraf Ghani, William Maley, Ahmed Rashid, and Olivier Roy, "Afghanistan: Reconstruction and Peacebuilding in a Regional Framework," KOFF Peacebuilding Reports 1/2001, Swiss Peace Foundation, Bern, 2001.
- "A Blueprint for Afghanistan," Current History (April 2002) pp. 153–157.
- With Helena Malikyar.
  - "Center Periphery Relations in the Afghan State: Current Practices, Future Prospects." December 2002. http://www.cic.nyu.edu/pdf/CPReport0107031.pdf Archived 2005-11-08 at the Wayback Machine.
  - _____. "The Politics of Center-Periphery Relations in Afghanistan." March 2003. https://web.archive.org/web/20051108192607/http://www.cic.nyu.edu/pdf/WBCPAfgh.pdf
- With Andrea Armstrong. "Regional Issues in the Reconstruction of Afghanistan." World Policy Journal 20 (spring 2003), 1: pp. 37–48. Reprinted in Glenn P. Hastedt (ed.), American Foreign Policy, Tenth Edition (Guilford, Connecticut.: McGraw-Hill/Dushkin, 2004), pp. 67–73.
- With Andrea Armstrong. "Regional Conflict Formations in Central Asia and Central Africa," in Making States Work: State Failure and the Crisis of Governance (eds. Simon Chesterman, Michael Ignatieff, and Romesh Thakur), Tokyo: UN University Press, 2005.
- With Abby Stoddard and Humayun Hamidzada. "Through the Fog of Peace Building: Evaluating the Reconstruction of Afghanistan." Paying For Essentials: A Policy Paper Series: Center on International Cooperation, March 2003. http://www.cic.nyu.edu/pdf/THROUGH%20THE%20FOG2.pdf Archived 2005-11-12 at the Wayback Machine.
- With Humayun Hamidzada (editors). Towards a New Constitution for Afghanistan. Kabul: Maiwand Press, 2003. (English, Dari, and Pashto editions.)
- “Transitional Justice and Human Rights in Afghanistan.” International Affairs 79,3 (2003), 567–581.
- “Identifying Options and Entry Points for Disarmament, Demobilization, and Reintegration in Afghanistan.” In Mark Sedra (ed), Security in Afghanistan (Bonn: ZEF, 2003).
- “U.S. and Iranian Policy in Afghanistan,” in Iran and Its neighbors: Diverging Views on a Strategic Region (Berlin: Wtiftung Wissenschaft und Politik, July 2003), ed. Eugene Whitlock, pp. 29–34.
- “(Re)Building Afghanistan: The Folly of Stateless Democracy,” Current History (April 2004), pp. 165–170.
- With Abby Stoddard, Humayun Hamidzada, and Adib Farhadi. “Building a New Afghanistan: The Value of Success, the Cost of Failure.” Paying for Essentials: A Policy Paper Series (New York: Center on International Cooperation, New York University, March 2004), http://www.cic.nyu.edu/pdf/Building.pdf Archived 2005-12-20 at the Wayback Machine.
- “Crafting a Constitution for Afghanistan,” Journal of Democracy (July 2004) 15: pp. 5–19.
- “Road to Ruin: Afghanistan’s booming Opium Industry.” Washington and New York: Center for American Progress and Center on International Cooperation, NYU, 2004.
- Afghanistan 2005 and Beyond: Prospects for Improved Stability. The Hague: The Clingendael Institute, 2005.
- “The UN and the Prevention of Armed Conflict,” Security Dialogue 36 (3), pp. 381–383. Special Section on UN High-level Panel on Threats, Challenges and Change.
- “Afghanistan: A U.S. Perspective,” in Ivo Daalder, Nicole Gnesotto, Philip H. Gordon (eds.) Crescent of Crises: U.S.-European Strategy for the Greater Middle East (Washington: Brookings Institution Press, 2005).
- “Peace Building, State Building: Constructing Sovereignty for Security,” Survival 47, no. 4 (Winter 2005–06), 93–106. Also appeared as: “Consolidación de la paz, consolidación del estado: construir soberanía para la seguridad,” Centro de Investigacíon para la Paz (CIP-FUHEM), Madrid, 2005.
- “Afghanistan: la souveraineté comme condition de la sécurité,” Critique Internationale 28 (July–September 2005), 169–183. Also published as “Peace Building and State Building in Afghanistan: Constructing Sovereignty for Whose Security?” Third World Quarterly 47:4 (Winter 2005–6).
- “Propuestas para la estabilidad de Afganistán,” Papeles, no. 91 Centro de Investigación para la Paz (CIP-FUHEM), (Madrid, Autumn 2005), 91–102.
- “The Politics of Security in State-Building,” in Charles T. Call, ed., The Challenges of State-Building and Peacebuilding (International Peace Academy).
- "Prevention of Violent Conflict: Tasks and Challenges for the United Nations,” Global Governance (forthcoming 2006). Also published as “La prevención de conflictos violentos: tareas y desafíos para Naciones Unidas,” Centro de Investigación para la Paz (CIP-FUHEM), Madrid, September 2005.
- “Central Asia and Central Africa: Transnational Wars and Ethnic Conflicts,” The Journal of Human Development, Volume 7 (2006), Issue 1, pp. 5–22.
- “Afghanistan’s Uncertain Transition from Turmoil to Normalcy,” Council on Foreign Relations Special Report, April 10, 2006, https://web.archive.org/web/20100511042443/http://www.cfr.org/publication/10273/.
- With Abubaker Siddique, “Resolving the Pakistan- Afghanistan Stalemate,” USIP Special Report no. 76, October 2006.
- “Saving Afghanistan,” Foreign Affairs 86: 1 (January–February 2007): 57–78.
- With Bruce Jones. “Prevention of Violent Conflict: Tasks and Challenges for the United Nations,” Global Governance 13:3 (July–September 2007): 391–408.
- With Humayun Hamidzada, “From Bonn to London: Governance Challenges and the Future of Statebuilding in Afghanistan,” International Peacekeeping 14:1 (February 2007): 1.
- Barnett R. Rubin and Alexandra Guaqueta, “Fighting Drugs and Building Peace: Towards Policy Coherence between Counter-Narcotics and Peace Building,” Dialogue on Globalization 37 (2007). Friedrich Ebert Stiftung, OSI, CIC, and Ideas para la Paz.
- With Jake Sherman, “Counter-Narcotics to Stabilize Afghanistan: The False Promise of Crop Eradication Archived 2015-11-06 at the Wayback Machine,” Center on International Cooperation, February 2008.
- “Afghan Dilemmas: Defining Commitment,” The American Interest 3:5 (May–June 2008).
- With Ahmed Rashid, “From Great Game to Grand Bargain: Ending Chaos in Afghanistan and Pakistan,” Foreign Affairs (November–December 2008): 2–16.
- . Alexander Thier (ed.), “The Future of the Afghan State,” in Afghanistan in Ten Years Washington, D.C.: United States Institute of Peace, 2009.
- “A Tribe Apart: Afghan elites face a corrosive past,” Boston Review (January/February 2009): 21–27.
- Sara Daniel and Huber Védrine (eds.), “Afghanistan,” in Guerres d’Aujourd’hui, Paris: Editions Delavilla, 2009.
- L'Afghanistan sur le Point de Bascule: Conversations avec Barnett R. Rubin (Montreal: Varia, forthcoming).
- “Afghanistan,” in Challenges for the New Administration (Washington, D.C.: Institute for National and Strategic Studies, 2008).
- “Afghanistan and Pakistan,” Great Decisions 2009 (New York: Foreign Policy Association, 2009).
- Afghanistan from the Cold War through the War on Terror. New York, NY: Oxford University Press, 2013.

=== Public service publications ===
- With Jeri Laber, "Tears, Blood, and Cries": Human Rights in Afghanistan Since the Invasion, 1979-1984 (New York: Helsinki Watch, 1984).
- To Die in Afghanistan: Human Rights in Afghanistan 1985 (New York: Helsinki Watch, 1985). Translated as Afghanistan: Ein Volk Stirbt, trans. Renate Schmid and Theodor Heinrich (Munich: Promultis, 1986).
- "Prepared Statement," in The Situation in Afghanistan, Hearing before the Subcommittee on Asian and Pacific Affairs of the Committee on Foreign Affairs, House of Representatives, May 1, 1986, (Washington: U.S. Government Priority Office, 1986), pp. 79– 98.
- Cycles of Violence: Human Rights in Sri Lanka since the Indo-Sri Lanka Agreement (Washington, D.C.: Asia Watch, 1987).
- "Afghan Repatriation," World Refugee Survey—1988 in Review (Washington: U.S. Committee for Refugees, 1989), pp. 70–71.
- "Actions of the Pakistan Military with Respect to Afghanistan: Human Rights Concerns," News from Asia Watch, February 27, 1989.
- Testimony before Joint Hearing of Subcommittees on Europe and the Middle East and Asia and the Pacific, Committee on Foreign Affairs, U.S. House of Representatives, March 7, 1990.
- Testimony before Congressional Task Force on Security and Cooperation in Europe (Helsinki Commission), April 23, 1990.
- Testimony before Subcommittee on Asia and the Pacific, Committee on Foreign Affairs, U.S. House of Representatives, June 20, 1991.
- With Paul Goble, Nancy Lubin, and Robert Oakley, "Afghanistan and Post-Soviet Central Asia: Prospects for Political Evolution and the Role of Islam," A Special Report of the Study Group on the Prospects for the Southern Tier of Former Soviet Republics, United States Institute of Peace (USIP: Washington, 1992).
- "Asia Survey: New Technologies Breach the Five Barriers to Freedom of Information," Intermedia 21(January–February 1993), pp. 2–8.
- With Rachel Denber, Human Rights in Tajikistan: In the Wake of Civil War (Human Rights Watch/Helsinki Watch and Memorial, New York and Moscow: 1993).
- Testimony on Afghanistan, Subcommittee on Asia and the Pacific, Committee on International Relations, U.S. House of Representatives, 8 May 1996.
- “Afghanistan: The Forgotten Crisis,” (February 1996), a WRITENET Country Paper on UNHCR page (https://web.archive.org/web/20110617024623/http://www.unhcr.ch/refworld/country/writenet/wriafg.htm).
- “Afghanistan: The Forgotten Crisis – Update March - November 1996,” (December 1996), WRITENET Country Paper on UNHCR page (https://web.archive.org/web/20010630061926/http://www.unhcr.ch/refworld/country/writenet/wriafg02.htm).
- “Afghanistan: Persistent Crisis Challenges the UN System,” (September 1998), a WRITENET Country Paper on UNHCR page (https://web.archive.org/web/20110412010101/http://www.unhcr.ch/refworld/country/writenet/wriafg03.htm).
- “Conflict and Peace in Afghanistan.” Afghanistan Outlook (UN, Islamabad), December 1999, pp. 6–12.
- Testimony on Afghanistan, Committee on International Relations, U.S. House of Representatives, 7 November 2001.
- Testimony on Reconstruction of Afghanistan, Committee on International Relations, U.S. House of Representatives, 13 June 2003.
- With CARE. “Afghanistan: The Cost of Doing Too Little,” CARE and the Center on International Cooperation, New York University, March 2004, http://www.cic.nyu.edu/pdf/CICBrief_final.pdf Archived 2006-01-16 at the Wayback Machine.
- Testimony before Senate Committee on Armed Services, March 31, 2007.
- Testimony before House Committee on International Affairs, September 20, 2007.
- Testimony before Senate Foreign Affairs Committee, September 21, 2007.

=== Journalism and commentary ===
- "A Tribe Apart". Boston Review. 2012-06-20.
- "U.S. Aid for Pakistan," New York Times (February 19, 1982).
- "Movie Gandhi Tells of the Man, not the Movement," New Haven Register (January 25, 1983).
- "Afghans Beleaguered," New York Times (May 25, 1984).
- With Jeri Laber, "A Dying Nation," The New York Review of Books 31 (January 17, 1985), pp. 3–4.
- With Jeri Laber, "The War in the City: In Kabul a New Soviet Society is Created," New Republic (March 4, 1985), pp. 16–18.
- With Jeri Laber, "'Afghanaragua' Won't Take," Chicago Tribune, June 13, 1985.
- "La democratisation des regimes autoritaires." Haïti Observateur 15 (July 12–19, 1985), p. 13; ibid. (July 26 -August 2, 1985), p. 17.
- "Afghan Deal Is the Better Choice: Protracted War Through Pakistan Would Be Hard to Sustain," Los Angeles Times, December 20, 1985.
- "Time to Test Soviets on Afghanistan," The Muslim Magazine (Islamabad), December 27, 1985.
- "Pakistani Critics Need U.S. Attention If Aid to Afghans Is to Continue," New York Times, January 9, 1986.
- "Helping the Soviet Union Quit Afghanistan: The U.S., Pakistan and the Resistance Should Test Moscow." New York Times, May 6, 1986.
- "The Overlooked War in Afghanistan: Where are the Leftist Critics?" New York Times, October 18, 1986.
- "Contradictory Perspectives," The Indian Post (Bombay), April 27, 1987.
- "The Politics of Identity," The Indian Post (Bombay), May 25, 1987.
- "Why the world continues to pursue the Nazis," The Indian Post (Bombay), June 2, 1987.
- "The Re-discovery of India," The Indian Post, June 25, 1987.
- "What India Can Learn from Korea," The Indian Post, July 23, 1987.
- "An Avenue out of the Afghan War," New York Times, August 14, 1987.
- "Afghan Resistance and Political Settlement," The Muslim (Islamabad), August 19, 1987.
- "Elections Alone Do Not Symbolise Democracy," The Indian Post, August 20, 1987.
- "Who Will be Left if Everyone is Right?" The Indian Post, September 17, 1987.
- "How the Afghan problem can be solved," The Indian Post, October 10, 1987.
- "Settlement is now possible in Afghanistan," The Indian Post, November 23, 1987.
- "Afghan Settlement: A precondition to a nuclear-free South Asia," The Indian Post, December 1, 1987.
- "Hands off Afghanistan," The Christian Science Monitor, July 28, 1988.
- "Soviet Lessons of Afghanistan Assure Pullout Will Go On," Los Angeles Times, November 14, 1988.
- "Afghanistan's Uncertain Fate," The Nation (February 27, 1989), pp. 264–267, 270.
- "Toward Self-Determination in Afghanistan," Christian Science Monitor, August 15, 1989.
- "End the Cold War in Afghanistan," The Washington Post, November 29, 1989.
- "The past is not dead," New Times (Moscow), 1990, no. 8, pp. 14–16.
- "U.S. South Asia Policy is Obsolete," Christian Science Monitor, October 9, 1990.
- "Pakistan: No Stamp of Approval," New York Times, November 1, 1990.
- "The USSR Backs into the Future," Christian Science Monitor, January 30, 1991.
- "Healing Afghanistan, The Heart of Asia," Asian The Wall Street Journal, January 24, 1992.
- "U.S. Aid Can Unite and Heal Afghanistan and Central Asia," Newsday, May 19, 1992.
- "Toward Peaceful Afghan Diversity," Asian The Wall Street Journal, July 14, 1992.
- “Afghanistan’s Haunted Landscape,” Asian The Wall Street Journal, August 11, 1993.
- “Salvaging Afghanistan,” New York Times, April 22, 1995.
- With Seymour Topping, “Will Kosovo Explode?,” New York Times, March 11, 1996.
- “Burundi: There Is No Exit Strategy,” Brookings Review (Spring 1996).
- “Support African Initiative in Burundi,” Washington Times, August 1, 1996.
- “Afghanistan: Still Foreign, But More Policy?” Crosslines, 4/5 August 1996.
- “Violence Pays in Kosovo,” Christian Science Monitor,” March 17, 1998.
- “Helping Afghanistan.” Newsweek. July 13, 1998.
- “Afghans Can Be Our Allies,” New York Times, September 22, 2001.
- “Rebuilding Afghanistan” The Wall Street Journal, October 15, 2001. Co-authored with Ashraf Ghani.
- “Putting an End to Warlord Government,” New York Times, January 15, 2002.
- “Is America Abandoning Afghanistan?” New York Times, April 10, 2002.
- With Ahmed Rashid. “SOS from Afghanistan.” The Wall Street Journal, May 29, 2003.
- “The Flashpoint where Afghanistan Meets Pakistan.” International Herald Tribune, January 12, 2004.
- “Afghan Dispatch,” The Wall Street Journal, February 10, 2004.
- “In Kabul, the Government Owns the Peace,” International Herald Tribune, May 6, 2004.
- “Let Afghans Vote When They’re Ready,” International Herald Tribune, June 14, 2004.
- “Afghanistan’s Vote could Trigger Mayhem,” International Herald Tribune, August 4, 2004.
- “Afghanistan’s Fatal Addiction,” International Herald Tribune, October 28, 2004.
- With Omar Zakhilwal, “A War on Drugs or a War on Farmers?” The Wall Street Journal, January 11, 2005.
- “The Wrong Voting System in Afghanistan,” International Herald Tribune, March 16, 2005.
- “Turmoil at the heart of Central Asia Slaughter in Andijon,” International Herald Tribune, May 25, 2005.
- “What Did the Spanish Soldiers Die For?” (“Afganistán: ¿por qué murieron los soldados españoles?”) Fundación para las Relaciones Internacionales y el Diàlogo Exterior (FRIDE), E-Newsletter #11, September 2005.
- “Toward a Post-Bonn Framework,” Afghanistan Update (October 2005), Kabul.
- “The Death of an Afghan Optimist,” The Washington Post, September 17, 2006.
- “A Border Affair,” The Wall Street Journal, October 25, 2006.
- “Just When Things Were Looking Up in Afghanistan,” International Herald Tribune, November 24, 2007.
- “The Musharraf Problem,” The Wall Street Journal, December 29, 2007.
- “Borderline State,” The Nation (Abu Dhabi), September 12, 2008.

=== Other academic publications ===
- With Adam Przeworski and Ernest Underhill, "The Evolution of the Class Structure of France, 1901-1968," Economic Development and Cultural Change (July 1980).
- With Sheppard G. Kellam, C. Hendricks Brown, and Margaret E. Ensminger, "Paths Leading to Teenage Psychiatric Symptoms and Substance Use: Developmental Epidemiological Studies in Woodlawn," in Robert Guze editor, Childhood Psychopathology and Development (New York: Raven Press, 1983).
- With Margaret E. Ensminger and Sheppard G. Kellam, "School and Family Origins of Delinquency: Comparisons by Sex," in Katherine Teilmann Van Dusen and Sarnoff A. Mednick editors, Prospective Studies of Crime and Delinquency (Boston: Kluwer-Nijhoff, 1983).
