= The Rudolphs =

Lloyd Rudolph and Susanne Rudolph, known together as the Rudolphs, are American academians who extensively researched on Indian history and democracy.

== Life ==
They were PhD students at Harvard University and came to India for research on democracy in 1956 under grant by Ford Foundation. They travelled by Land Rover jeep and finally stayed at Jaipur for research on history of Rajasthan, a western state in India. They initially lived at Tilaknagar in Jaipur and later moved to Narayan Niwas. Their children studied in India and can speak Hindi language too. One of their daughters was married in their Jaipur home. They stayed at Chennai for brief period. They together with Mohan Singh Kanota wrote Reversing The Gaze, based on the 89 volumes of the Amar Singh diary which are now on display at Amar Singh Library and Museum in Kanota Castle near Jaipur. They spent five out of seven research years in India, 1956–57, 1971–72, 1975–76, 1979–80 and 1983–84 in Jaipur and finally made it their second home in 1984. They taught at University of Rajasthan also. They taught at University of Chicago from 1964 until their retirement in 2002. Until their deaths, they lived in Kensington, California.

== Works ==
Their works are as follows:

- Essays on Rajasthan
- The Idea of Rajasthan
- The Modernity of Tradition: Political Development in India
- Education and Politics in India
- The Regional Imperative: The Administration of US Foreign Policy Towards South Asian States
- Gandhi: The Traditional Roots of Charisma
- Essays on Rajputana
- In Pursuit of Lakshmi: The Political Economy of the Indian State
- Reversing the Gaze: The Amar Singh Diary, a Colonial Subject's Narrative of Imperial India
- Postmodern Gandhi and Other Essays: Gandhi in the World and at Home

== Awards ==
They were awarded Padma Bhushan, the third highest civilian award in India, by the Government of India in 2014.
