= Susanne Hoeber Rudolph =

German-American political scientist (1930–2015)

- Born: Susanne Hoeber; April 3, 1930; Mannheim, Germany
- Died: December 23, 2015 (aged 85); Oakland, California, U.S.
- Occupations: Author, Educationist, Political thinker
- Spouse: Lloyd Rudolph
- Awards: Padma Bhushan; William Benton Distinguished Service Professor Emerita at the University of Chicago

Susanne Hoeber Rudolph (April 3, 1930 – December 23, 2015) was an American author, political thinker and educationist. She was a William Benton Distinguished Service Professor Emerita at the University of Chicago and was actively interested in Politics, Political Economy and Political Sociology of South Asia, State Formation, Max Weber and the Politics of Category and Culture. The Government of India, in 2014, honored her, along with her husband, Lloyd I. Rudolph, for their services to literature and education, by bestowing on them the third highest civilian award, the Padma Bhushan.

== Biography ==
We write as insiders and outsiders, insiders because for over five decades, from locations in Chicago and Jaipur, we have studied Indian politics, and outsiders because..., says Susanne Rudolph, we seek to be reflexive political scientists of India

Susanne Höber was the granddaughter of physiologist Rudolf Höber and daughter of Johannes Höber and Elfriede Fischer Höber, both of whom held doctoral degrees in political science from Heidelberg University. As an activist in Germany's Social Democratic Party, Johannes was imprisoned by the Nazis in 1934 and forced to move from Mannheim, where Susanne was born in 1930, to Düsseldorf. In 1939, when Susanne was nine, the family fled the Nazis and moved to Philadelphia, where Rudolf Höber was a professor at the University of Pennsylvania.

Susanne Rudolph had her early college education at Sarah Lawrence College from where she obtained her BA in 1951 which she followed with an MA from Harvard University in 1953. Continuing her education, she secured her PhD from Radcliffe College in 1955. She taught political science at Harvard University until 1963, when the University of Chicago simultaneously offered her and her husband, Lloyd Rudolph, professorial positions. She joined University of Chicago in 1964 where she worked as the William Benton Distinguished Service Professor Emerita of Political Science.

Susanne was married to Lloyd I. Rudolph, himself a Professor Emeritus of Political Science at the University of Chicago and the co-author of her books. The couple has three children, Jenny, Amelia and Matthew. Susanne, along with her husband, divided their time between the USA and India, where they found a home in Jaipur.

Susanne Rudolph died on December 24, 2015.

== Career ==
Susanne Hoeber Rudolph has served in many capacities of importance during her career.

- President - Association for Asian Studies (1986)
- President - American Political Science Association (2003–2004)
- Master of the Social Science Collegiate Division
- Director of the Center for International Studies
- Director of the South Asia Language and Area Center (1980–1998)
- Chair of the Department of Political Science
- Faculty — Department of Political Science and the College, University of Chicago (1964)
- Associate Professor — Department of Political Science and the College, University of Chicago (1964–72)
- Professor — Department of Political Science and the College, University of Chicago (1972-)
- Associate Dean of the College, University of Chicago (1973–75)
- William Benton Distinguished Service Professor — Department of Political Science and the College, University of Chicago (1990-)
- Professor Emerita — Department of Political Science and the College, University of Chicago (2002-)

== Legacy ==
Susanne and Lloyd Rudolph's associations with the University of Chicago and India have assisted in the University's decision to open a major academic centre in New Delhi. The centre is envisaged to act as a platform for mutual support and collaboration between students and scholars from India and Chicago in the areas of academics and research.

== Awards and recognitions ==
- Padma Bhushan - 2014
- William Benton Distinguished Service Professor Emerita
- India Abroad Friend of India Award -

== Works ==
Susanne Rudolph has authored eight books, together with her husband, Lloyd Rudolph. The writings of Susanne were compiled by Oxford University Press, in 2008, into a three volume publication under the name, Explaining Indian Democracy: A Fifty-Year Perspective.

- Susanne Rudolph, Lloyd Rudolph (January 24, 2008). Explaining Indian Democracy: A Fifty-Year Perspective. Oxford University Press. ISBN 978-0-19-569365-2.

The other major works by Susanne Rudolph are:

- Susanne Rudolph; Lloyd Rudolph (October 10, 2006). Postmodern Gandhi and Other Essays — Gandhi in the World and at Home. University of Chicago Press. ISBN 978-0-226-73124-7.
- Susanne Rudolph; Lloyd Rudolph (November 22, 1996). Transnational Religion and Fading States. Westview Press. ISBN 978-0-8133-2768-6.
- Susanne Rudolph; Lloyd Rudolph (2008). "Education and Politics in India". British Journal of Educational Studies. British Journal of Educational Studies. ISSN 0007-1005.
- Susanne Rudolph; Lloyd Rudolph (April 15, 1987). In Pursuit of Lakshmi: the Political Economy of the Indian State. University of Chicago Press. ISBN 978-0-226-73139-1.
- Susanne Rudolph; Lloyd Rudolph (March 1, 1985). Essays on Rajputana: Reflections on History, Culture and Administration. University of Chicago Press. ISBN 978-0-391-03129-6.
- Susanne Rudolph; Lloyd Rudolph; Mohan Singh Kanota; Amar Singh (November 14, 1999). Reversing the Gaze: Amar Singh's Diary — A Colonial Subject's Narrative of Imperial India. Basic Books. ISBN 978-0-391-03129-6.
- Susanne Rudolph; Lloyd Rudolph (May 25, 2008). Making U.S. Foreign Policy Toward South Asia: Regional Imperatives and the Imperial Presidency. Indiana University Press. ISBN 978-0-253-22000-4.
- Susanne Rudolph; Lloyd Rudolph (July 15, 1984). The Modernity of Tradition: Political Development in India. University of Chicago Press. ISBN 978-0-226-73137-7.

She has also edited the book, Agrarian Power and Agricultural Productivity in South Asia besides writing many articles, some of which are:

- Susanne Rudolph (March 2005). "The Imperialism of Categories; Situating Knowledge in a Globalizing World". Perspectives on Politics. 3 (1).
- Susanne Rudolph (2005). "Perestroika and Its Other". Perestroika! Revolution in the Social Sciences — Kristin Renwick Monroe (Ed.). Oxford University Press.
- Susanne Rudolph (2004). "Engaging Subjective Knowledge: Narratives of and by the Self in the Amar Singh Diary". Of Narratives, Narrators — Rajul Bhargava Shubhshree (Ed.). Rawat Publications.
- Susanne Rudolph (2004). "Toward Convergence". In Ian Shapiro; Rogers M. Smith; Tarek E. Masoud (eds.). Problems and Methods in the Study of Politics: Proofs. Yale University Press.
- Susanne Rudolph (May 2001). "The Iconisation of Chandrababu; Sharing Sovereignty in India's Federal Market Economy". Economic and Political Weekly. XXXVI (18).
- Susanne Rudolph (July 2000). "Living With Difference in India; Legal Pluralism and Legal Universalism in Historical Context". Political Quarterly.

== See also ==
- Lloyd Rudolph
- The Rudolphs
