= Beta dispersion =

Cell biology

Beta dispersion is the phenomenon associated with the ability of a biological cell membrane to filter out low frequency currents and allow high frequency currents to pass through. It was originally hypothesized by Rudolf Höber in 1910 and confirmed through a series of experiments between 1910 and 1913.

Höber observed that living tissue has greater electrical resistance compared to dead tissue and that there could be two reasons for this. His first hypothesis was that ions do not pass freely through the cell surface. This property maintains ions within the cell. Upon cell death, the insulating property of the cell membrane is lost. He also hypothesized that electrolytes within the cell were bound to internal structures and would dissociate from these structures during cell death and would then be able to exit the cell. Höber then performed a series of experiments to test these hypotheses.

Höber used centrifugation to obtain a dense pellet of red blood cells then measured the conductivity of the cell sample at low frequencies (100 – 200 Hz) by using methods developed by Friedrich Kohlrausch. It was determined that the cells had a conductivity equal to 0.02% NaCl solution.

Next, an oscillatory circuit was built to measure the conductivity of the cell samples at high frequencies. NaCl solutions of varying concentrations or cell samples were used as a varying capacitor within the circuit. The dampening effect on the oscillating current was compared in the NaCl solutions and the compacted cell samples to determine the cell conductivity. Through optimization of the circuit and further experimentation with blood cells and frog leg muscle cells, Höber determined that blood cells have a conductivity equal to 0.18% NaCl solution when subjected to high frequencies(1 - 10 MHz).

Hober found that, at high frequencies, the cell conductivity was about five times greater compared to conductivity at low frequencies. This suggested that electrical current would flow around the outer surface of the cell at low frequencies, but at high frequencies, could pass through the cellular envelope and travel through the ion-rich intracellular environment. After inducing pores in the cell membrane and subjecting the cell sample to low frequency current, a much higher conduction was observed compared previous data. This verified that the conductivity being measured was indeed the conductivity of the fluid within the cell.

This work served as the basis for what is known as beta dispersion and also served as proof that cells have a high internal concentration of free ions, which is maintained by a membrane through which ions can not freely pass.

== See also ==
- alpha dispersion
