= Andrea Armstrong =

American basketball player (born 1982)

Personal information
- Born: May 18, 1982 (age 44) Lakeside, Oregon, U.S.
- Listed height: 6 ft 3 in (1.91 m)

Career information
- College: Kansas State (2000–2002); South Florida (2002–2004)
- Position: Forward / Center

Andrea Armstrong (born May 18, 1982) is an American who is a former NCAA basketball player.

Armstrong hails from Lakeside, Oregon, but was born in Longview, Washington.

After a stellar high school basketball career, Armstrong began her collegiate sports career in 2001, with the Kansas State University basketball team. She played for Kansas State until the 2002 season. She was a 2002 Academic All-Big 12 selection.

Armstrong transferred to the University of South Florida in 2003, which was a red shirt season in accordance with NCAA regulations. She was team co-captain for the 2004 season. She claimed to have converted to Islam soon after her arrival at the Florida campus.

Armstrong created a controversy when she requested to be allowed to play in Islamically appropriate attire. The school initially did not want to allow her to do this, and Armstrong lost her scholarship in the first week of September of that year.

On September 11, the school announced it was going to back off and let Armstrong wear modest athletic attire for their basketball games, and re-instate her scholarship. Armstrong and school officials had met the previous day to discuss her reinstatement. Ahmed Bedler, spokesman for the Council on American-Islamic Relations, was present at the reunion, and he declared that "An athlete should not be asked to choose between engaging in healthy sporting activities and her deeply held religious beliefs".

Days later, Armstrong left the team. She averaged three points and two rebounds per game for South Florida.

In October, Armstrong also left Florida and returned to Oregon, where she e-mailed a local newspaper her reversion to Christianity and renunciation of Islam, and regretfully retracted her conversion to the latter.

== Kansas State and South Florida statistics ==
Legend
GP	Games played	GS	Games started	MPG	Minutes per game
FG%	Field goal percentage	3P%	3-point field goal percentage	FT%	Free throw percentage
RPG	Rebounds per game	APG	Assists per game	SPG	Steals per game
BPG	Blocks per game	PPG	Points per game	**Bold**	Career high

Year	Team	GP	Points	FG%	3P%	FT%	RPG	APG	SPG	BPG	PPG
2000-01	Kansas State	**28**	**135**	33.6%	0.0%	73.4%	**2.7**	**0.9**	**0.6**	0.1	**4.8**
2001-02	Kansas State	20	46	**35.6%**	**33.3%**	**86.7%**	1.5	0.6	0.1	-	2.3
2002-03	South Florida	Sat out due to NCAA transfer rules									
2003-04	South Florida	27	93	34.4%	25.9%	62.5%	2.3	0.6	0.2	**0.2**	3.4
Career		75	274	34.2%	59.3%	45.6%	27.3	0.7	0.3	0.1	3.7
