= Steven Krasner =

American writer

- Born: August 1, 1953 (age 73)
- Education: Columbia University
- Occupations: Sports journalist, children's books writer, former faculty member at Bryant University, international education consultant, and executive director of a non-profit organization, Rhode Island Write on Sports.
- Writing career
- Language: English

Steven Krasner (born August 1, 1953) is a retired sports journalist and current author of children's books. He is best known for covering the Boston Red Sox for The Providence Journal, which he did from 1986 until his retirement from the newspaper in 2008. He is Executive Director of Rhode Island Write on Sports, conducts interactive classroom writing workshops as Nudging the Imagination, teaches journalism to 5th-7th graders at the Reach Out Global Academy in Singapore, is a former adjunct professor of writing at Bryant University and has freelanced for ESPN-Boston.com.

== Early life ==
Krasner grew up in Cranston, Rhode Island, where he played varsity basketball and baseball at Cranston High School West. In 1975, he earned his bachelor's degree in English at Columbia University, earning team captain and MVP honors on the baseball team during his senior year. He was sports editor of the Columbia Daily Spectator.

== Personal life ==
Krasner and his wife, Susan Oclassen, have three children and six grandchildren. In 2025 his eldest grandchild, Juliana Krasner, became a Level 1 black belt in taekwondo.

== Career ==
=== Sports journalism ===
Krasner joined The Providence Journal in 1975 and covered many notable sports events, including three no-hitters and a number of World Series, baseball All-Star games, and Super Bowls. He was covering the 1989 World Series at Candlestick Park when it was interrupted by a 6.9-magnitude earthquake.

Krasner was inducted into the Words Unlimited Hall of Fame in 2008 and received the Dave O'Hara Award at the Boston Baseball Writers' Association of America dinner in 2010. He is a voter for the Baseball Hall of Fame and was a longtime advocate for the inclusion of Jim Rice, who was elected in his final year of eligibility in 2009. From 2010 to 2013 Krasner covered the Red Sox and the New England Patriots on a freelance basis for ESPN-Boston.com.

=== Children's books ===
In addition to his sports writing career, Krasner has published numerous children's books. These include Why Not Call it Cow Juice?; The Longest Game; Pedro Martinez; Have a Nice Nap, Humphrey; Play Ball Like the Hall of Famers; and Play Ball Like the Pros. The latter won the Parents' Choice Silver Award in 2002.

=== Nudging the Imagination ===
Krasner conducts numerous grade-appropriate writing workshops, virtually and in person, entitled Nudging the Imagination, that engage students in the writing process and align with standards. Among other workshops he helps school classes write and perform plays, and he also presents Professional Development workshops at conferences across the country.

=== Rhode Island Write on Sports ===
In 2013 Krasner became Executive Director of Rhode Island Write on Sports (RIWoS), a non-profit organization that helps under-served middle-school students in Rhode Island gain confidence and experience in writing, with sports as the content. He conducted his first RIWoS summer sports writing camp at the Calcutt Middle School in Central Falls, RI. His camp was featured in an article in the Providence Journal on July 16, 2014. In 2017 RIWoS expanded to two camps, one at Providence College and one at Bryant University. RIWoS is an affiliate of Write on Sports, Inc.

=== International education consulting ===
In 2021 Krasner started teaching journalism to 5th-7th graders at the Reach Out Global Academy in Singapore. Previous international experience includes interactive writing workshops in Tver, Russia.

=== Academia ===
Krasner was an adjunct professor at Bryant University from 2017-2020, teaching freshman writing classes.
