= Jennifer Kilian =

American-Dutch translator (born 1953)

Jennifer Mary Kilian (born September 19, 1953, New York City, New York, United States) is an American-Dutch translator. She started translating in 1988, when she co-founded Kist & Kilian with her associate Katy Kist. She studied art history at Barnard College and at the Institute of Fine Arts, NYU, NY, earning her Ph.D. in 1993 for her catalogue raisonne of the paintings of the Dutch Golden Age artist Karel du Jardin. Her book on the artist was published in 2005, and her catalogue of the Du Jardin exhibition in the Rijksmuseum came out in 2007/2008. Both were reviewed in The Burlington Magazine. As a translator, she has worked for the Mauritshuis, the Van Gogh Museum, and the Rijksmuseum, translating books, catalogues, wall texts, brochures, etc., on history and art history.

== Selected publications ==
- Kilian, Jennifer (2005). The paintings of Karel Du Jardin, 1626-1678 : catalogue raisonné. Amsterdam: John Benjamins Pub. ISBN 9789027253385.
- Kilian, Jennifer (2007). Karel du Jardin, 1626-1678. Amsterdam: Rijksmuseum. ISBN 9789086890309.
