= Dennis Delaney =

American writer (born 1953)

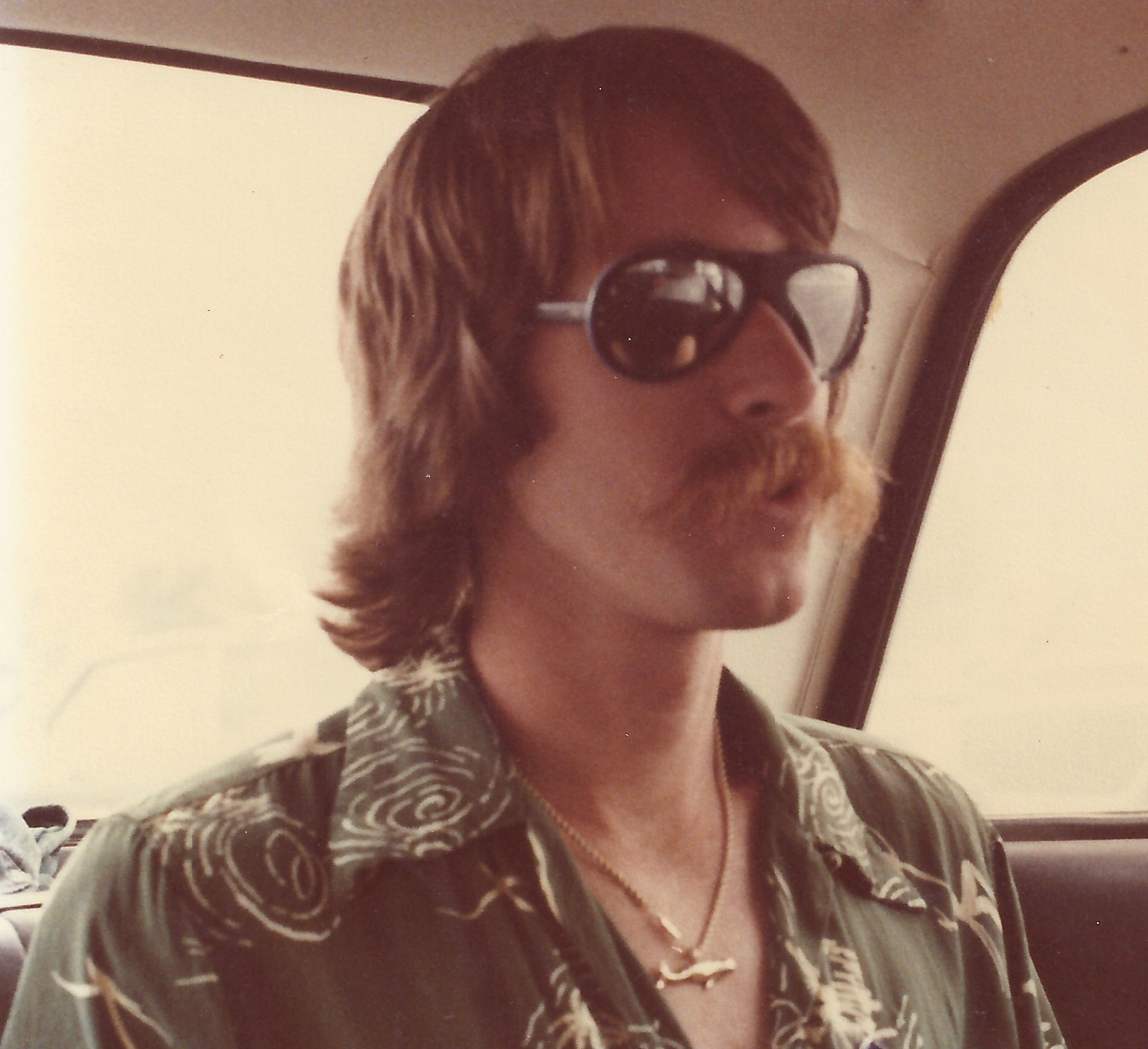
- Born: January 29, 1953 (age 73); Indianapolis, Indiana, U.S.
- Education: University of North Carolina School of the Arts; University of California Santa Cruz
- Occupation: Writer / Actor

Dennis Delaney (born January 29, 1953) is an American writer and actor, former environmental activist, and a Conscientious Objector to the war in Viet Nam. A founding member of Greenpeace USA, he became its first National Director in 1980. He is a graduate of the University of North Carolina School of the Arts, and the University of California, Santa Cruz. A 1987 recipient of the Robin Williams Scholarship in Acting, he won two Best Actor awards for his portrayal of Weston in Sam Shepard's 'Curse of the Starving Class' at the Mayakovsky Theatre in Moscow, Russia. He is the author of the novel Saving Whales.

== Greenpeace ==
In 1977 Delaney assumed the role of Research Director in the newly formed corporate office of Greenpeace Southern California. In 1978 he became the vice-president of the Southern California corporation as well as one of its principle media liaisons and spokespersons. On May 12, 1978, Delaney was arrested with Daniel Ellsberg and twelve others at the Rocky Flats Nuclear Weapons Production Facility in Golden, Colorado. Their arrest for trespassing and civil disobedience resulted in a high-profile trial before Judge Kim Goldberger, and national media coverage of the life-threatening environmental disaster caused by the radioactive waste and plutonium contamination. In the summer of 1978 he was a crew member on Greenpeace ship M/V Peacock, the last Greenpeace voyage to confront the largest whaling fleets in the world. Delaney ‘s voice-overs are featured in the documentary ‘Voyage of the Peacock’ produced by Phil Caston and Charles Lloyd. He joined with Joyce Yarrow to co-write the story continuity and narrative script for the film. Delaney became President of Greenpeace Southern California in 1979. On October 14 of that year Greenpeace International was founded which set into motion the creation of Greenpeace USA. In 1980 Dennis Delaney was recruited by David McTaggart (Chairman of Greenpeace International) and several Trustees of the newly formed Greenpeace USA, and soon thereafter was chosen as the first National Administrative Director of Greenpeace USA. He was the United States representative on the Greenpeace Council of the International Organization.

== Television and Film ==
In 2011, Delaney founded Mortalfool Productions.

== Fiction ==
- Saving Whales (2018)

== Plays ==
- Hejira (2001)
- Animus (2003)
- Conscientious Objection (2007)
