= Diane Coleman =

American lawyer, disability rights advocate (1953–2024)

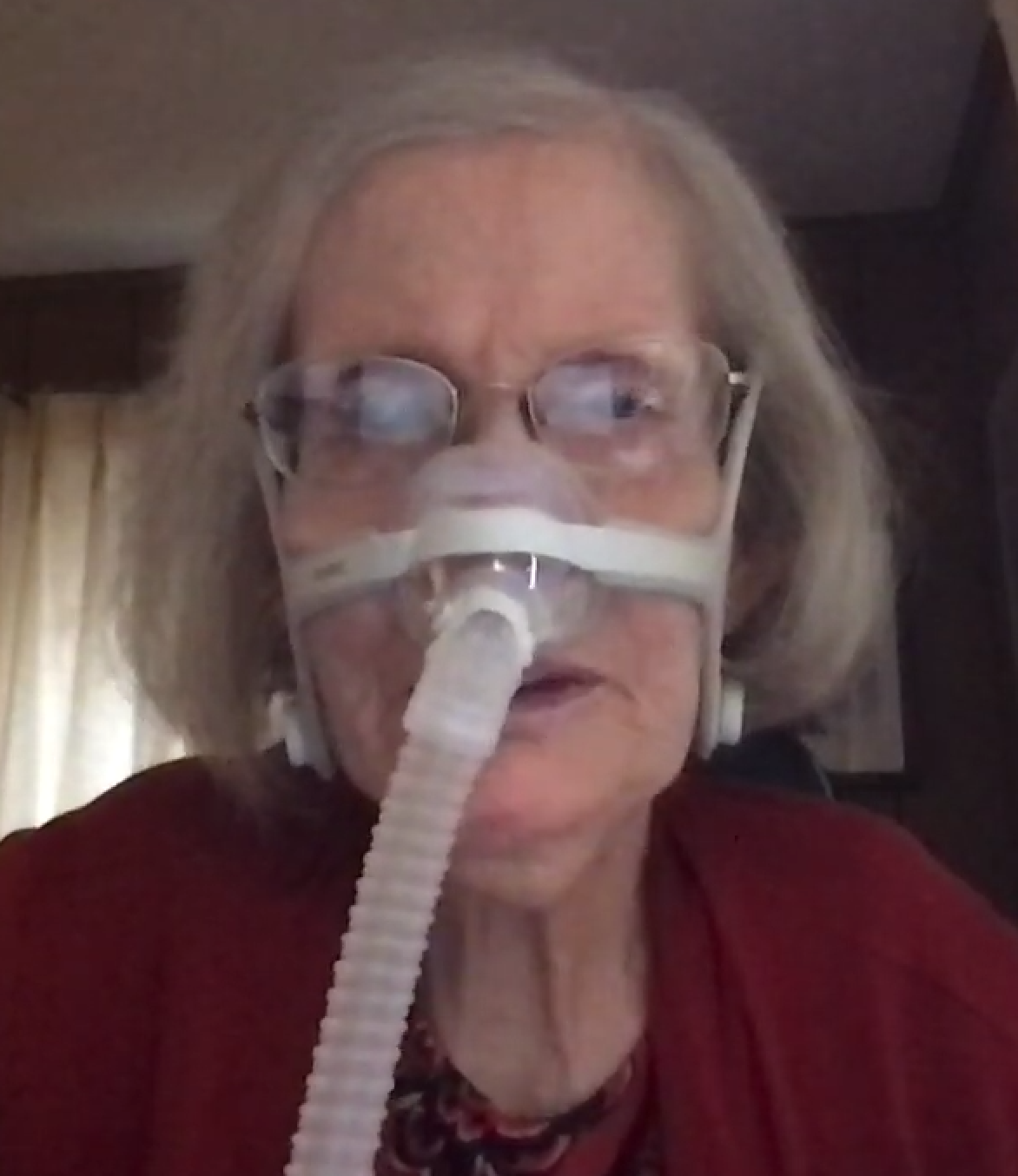
- Coleman in 2022
- Born: Diane Marie Coleman; August 11, 1953; Tawas City, Michigan, U.S.
- Died: November 1, 2024 (aged 71); Rochester, New York, U.S.
- Education: University of Illinois; University of California, Los Angeles
- Years active: 1974–2024
- Known for: Disability rights advocacy

Diane Marie Coleman (August 11, 1953 – November 1, 2024) was an American lawyer, disability rights advocate, and founder of the grassroots organization Not Dead Yet. She focused her career on opposing assisted suicide and advocating for equitable healthcare and social supports for disabled individuals.

== Early life and education ==
Diane Marie Coleman was born on August 11, 1953, in Tawas City, Michigan. At 10 days old, she was placed for adoption and raised by William Coleman, an appliance store owner, and Dolores Ferguson, a homemaker, in Kalamazoo, Michigan. She had two sisters.

At the age of six, Coleman was diagnosed with muscular dystrophy, later identified as spinal muscular atrophy, a condition affecting her motor neurons that required extensive medical support, including the use of a wheelchair by age 11. Doctors initially predicted that she would not survive into adulthood.

Coleman graduated as valedictorian from her high school. She earned a degree in psychology from the University of Illinois in 1976 and completed a joint J.D.-M.B.A. at the University of California, Los Angeles, in 1981.

== Career ==
Coleman began her career as a lawyer for the California Department of Corporations, specializing in consumer fraud cases. Her experiences with systemic barriers to accessibility motivated her to transition into disability rights advocacy.

Her advocacy work began in earnest in 1985, when she participated in a protest against the lack of wheelchair lifts on Los Angeles buses. She joined ADAPT in 1986, working with the group on campaigns for accessible public transportation and the eventual passage of the Americans with Disabilities Act (ADA).

In 1989, Coleman moved to Nashville, Tennessee, where she focused on developing independent living facilities for individuals with disabilities. By 1996, she relocated to Chicago and founded Not Dead Yet, a national grassroots disability rights organization opposing assisted suicide and euthanasia, which she argued perpetuated a "better dead than disabled" mindset prevalent in society and the healthcare system. She was the executive director of Progress Center for Independent Living in Forest Park, Illinois for twelve years.

In 1997, Coleman drafted Assisted Suicide: A Disability Perspective, a foundational paper for the National Council on Disability (NCD). This work was later reissued in 2005 and frequently cited in subsequent policy discussions and advocacy efforts.

Not Dead Yet protested against assisted suicide legislation and figures advocating for the right to die movement, such as pathologist and euthanasia proponent Jack Kevorkian. Coleman co-authored amicus briefs in court cases and testified before the U.S. Congress four times, presenting arguments about the systemic inequalities faced by people with disabilities in accessing adequate healthcare and support. Coleman highlighted societal biases in medical care, asserting that disabled individuals were often offered assistance to die without first being given meaningful options to live. She described this as the ultimate form of discrimination and made this critique central to her testimony and advocacy.

From 2003 to 2008, Coleman was an adjunct faculty member at the University of Illinois Chicago, where she co-taught two graduate courses centered on medical ethics and disability studies. By 2012, she had worked as the director of advocacy at the center for disability rights in Rochester, New York for three years.

== Personal life and death ==
Coleman married twice. Her first marriage, to Michael Yester, ended in divorce. She later married Stephen Drake, a fellow disability rights advocate. The couple moved to Rochester, New York, in 2008 to be closer to Drake's family. By this time, the progression of her condition required her to use a ventilator for breathing support.

Coleman died from sepsis at her home in Rochester on November 1, 2024, at the age of 71.
