= Center on International Cooperation at New York University =

American-based think tank

- Formation: 1996
- Founder: Shepard Forman
- Headquarters: New York, New York
- Acting Director: Paul Smoke
- Website: cic.nyu.edu

The Center on International Cooperation at New York University (CIC) is a research center and think tank at New York University. It was founded in 1996 by Shepard Forman.

== History and staff ==
CIC was established in 1996 by Shepard Forman.

On November 24, 2014, NYU announced that Sarah Cliffe would succeed Bruce Jones as CIC's third director, effective January 1, 2015.

In January 2025, Paul Smoke was named as Acting Director.

== Programs ==
- Congo Research Group
- Prevention and Peacebuilding
- Pathfinders for Peaceful, Just and Inclusive Societies
- Promoting and Defending Multilateralism
