= Philip E. Sakowitz Jr. =

- Born: May 29, 1953 (age 73)
- Education: B.S., Health and physical education, 1975
- Alma mater: Long Island University
- Employer: Coca-Cola Refreshments
- Title: Vice President, National Retail Sales, Federal Government & Military
- Successor: incumbent
- Board member of: Board Member, Defense Commissary Agency; Association of the US Army Civilian Advisory Board, Southwest Canners, Inc., National Park and Recreation Association Armed Forces Recreation Society
- Spouse: married
- Children: two
- Awards: Distinguished Presidential Rank; Meritorious Presidential Rank (twice); National Association for the Advancement of Colored People’s Award of Recognition for Service and Contributions to our Country in the areas of Civil Rights, Race Relations, Equal Opportunity, Affirmative Action and Public Service; Decoration for Exceptional Civilian Service, Army’s highest civilian award

Philip "Phil" Edward Sakowitz Jr. is an US Department of Defense executive. He has served as deputy chief of staff, base operations at Fort Monroe, Virginia from 1998–2002, director of Installation Management Transformation Task Force in 2002, deputy director of the U.S. Army Installation Management Agency from 2002–2006, executive director of the United States Army Installation Management Command from 2006–2008, and director and Chief Executive Officer of Defense Commissary Agency from 2008–2010. For his contributions to public service, he has also been given the Decoration for Exceptional Civilian Service, the Army’s highest civilian award.

== Early life and education ==
Sakowitz attended Red Bank Hospital. He then attended Long Island University on a basketball scholarship, graduating in 1975 with a bachelor of science degree in health physical education.

== Career ==
Sakowitz has held a number of managerial and executive positions with the Department of Defense and U.S. Army.

From 1975–1978, he was a Youth Activities Director at Fort Monmouth, New Jersey. This was followed by a posting as Youth Activities Director, Fitzsimons Army Medical Center, Colorado from 1978–1980.

Sakowitz served as Chief, Community Morale Services, U.S. Army Materiel Command, Alexandria, Virginia from 1981–1988 and, in 1981, he was also the Sports Director of New York Area Command and Fort Hamilton, New York.

From 1988–1989, he was the Director, Program Analysis and Evaluation, U.S. Army Community and Family Support Center in Alexandria, Virginia and from 1989–1996, the Chief, Morale, Welfare and Recreation at the Directorate of Personnel, U.S. Army Forces Command, Fort McPherson, Georgia.

From 1996–1998, Sakowitz served as Assistant Deputy Chief of Staff for Personnel and Installation Management, U.S. Army Forces Command, Fort McPherson, Georgia. He was responsible for installation management, individual and unit personnel readiness, mobilization planning and support, oversight of a $1.3 billion base operations budget and overall management of base support for DOD's largest major command, composed of over 800 thousand soldiers and 30 thousand civilians.

From 1998–2002, he was the Deputy Chief of Staff, Base Operations Support, U.S. Army Training and Doctrine Command, Fort Monroe, Virginia. In this capacity, he was responsible for installation management doctrine, policies, resources, standards and programs for fifteen major Army installations. He managed a $1.57 billion annual budget; 50+ thousand military and civilians; 2 million acres (8,100 km^{2}) of land; 160,000,000 square feet (15,000,000 m^{2}) of facilities worth $30 billion; $1+ billion contract support and daily base support for 150+ thousand students, active duty, reserves, civilians, and retirees.

In 2002, he became the Director, Installation Management Transformation Task Force at Arlington, Virginia. From 2002–2006, he served as Deputy Director, U.S. Army Installation Management Agency and, from 2006–2008, as Executive Director, United States Army Installation Management Command. All 3 positions were based in Arlington, Virginia.

From 2008–2010, Sakowitz was the Director and Chief Executive Officer of the Defense Commissary Agency, at Fort Lee.

== Award and honours ==
Sakowitz has been awarded:

- an NAACP People’s Award for contributions to Civil Rights, Race Relations, Equal Opportunity, Affirmative Action and Public Service; and
- the Decoration for Exceptional Civilian Service, the Army’s highest civilian award.

Government offices
| Preceded by Rick Page (acting Director) | Director & CEO of DeCA; 8 June 2008–July 1, 2010 | Succeeded by Joseph Jeu |
