= Chris Bury =

American journalist

- Born: Christopher Robert Bury; December 10, 1953 (age 72)
- Education: University of Wisconsin–Madison M.A. Southern Illinois University Carbondale B.A.
- Occupations: Journalist, Anchorman
- Notable credit(s): PBS; America Tonight; Nightline

Christopher Robert Bury (born December 10, 1953) is an American journalist best known for being a correspondent at ABC News Nightline, where he also served as substitute anchor. Bury was also a national correspondent based in Chicago for World News with Diane Sawyer and Good Morning America. He is now senior journalist in residence at DePaul University in Chicago. Bury's recent work includes contributions to PBS NewsHour and Al Jazeera America.

Bury began work in 1975 as a reporter for WCLX Radio in La Crosse, Wisconsin. From 1979 to 1980, he was an instructor at Marquette University's College of Journalism.

He then moved on to Milwaukee station WTMJ-TV, where he was a political and investigative reporter. In January 1981, he was co-host and reporter for "EXTRA," a television program at KTVI-TV in St. Louis. From 1981 to 1982, Bury was a reporter with KPRC-TV in Houston.

In 1982, he joined ABC News as a general assignment reporter based in Chicago. In 1992, Bury was assigned full-time coverage of Bill Clinton's Presidential campaign for World News Tonight, and was relocated to Nightline in Washington, D.C. after the inauguration, where he was a correspondent and anchor until 2007.

Bury received a Bachelor of Arts degree in political science from Southern Illinois University Carbondale and a Master of Arts in political science from the University of Wisconsin–Madison.

He is married to radio news journalist Catherine Catalane; they have two sons.

== Awards ==
- National Headliner Award for consumer reporting.
- 6-time Emmy Award winner for his work on Nightline and World News Tonight.
- Contributor to Nightline broadcasts, which earned two Peabody Awards
- Recipient of the Edward R. Murrow Award from Radio-Television News Directors Association for continuing coverage of the Whitewater story
- Alfred I. duPont-Columbia Journalism School Award for Outstanding Television Reporting for a World News Tonight series on children in poverty
- 1998 Distinguished Service to Journalism award from the University of Wisconsin–Madison
