= Jeri Laber =

American activist

Jeri Laber (born 1931) is one of the founders of Human Rights Watch, the largest human rights organization in the United States. She is the author and/or editor of dozens of Human Rights Watch reports and more than 100 articles on human rights issues published in The New York Times , The New York Review of Books and many other publications. Her memoir "The Courage of Strangers: Coming of Age with the Human Rights Movement" was published in 2002 by Public Affairs . She is co-author, with Barnett Rubin, of "A Nation is Dying: Afghanistan Under the Soviets," Northwestern University Press. Her novel, "The Russian Key," was published by Arcade in 2021.

In the course of her human rights work, Laber made many fact-finding trips to the former Soviet Union, Eastern Europe, Turkey and the Tribal Areas of Pakistan where she interviewed Afghan refugees. She offered friendship and moral support to dissidents in the former Communist countries, many of whom, after 1989, became the leaders of their newly democratic countries.

Laber was active in the early development of the human rights movement. She served as Executive Director of Helsinki Watch (which became Human Rights Watch) from 1978–1995 and then as Senior Adviser to Human Rights Watch until 2000. She was a founder of the International Helsinki Federation in 1983 and was its Vice-Chair for many years. She served as a consultant to the International Freedom to Publish Committee of the Association of American Publishers from 1977 to 2010.

Early in her career, Laber worked as Foreign Editor of The Current Digest of the Soviet Press and then as Publications Director of the Institute for the Study of the USSR. As a free-lance writer during the 1970s, she co-authored, with Molly Finn, Cooking for Carefree Weekends, Simon & Schuster, 1975, and co-edited, with Marion Cunningham, The Fannie Farmer Cookbook, Knopf, 1979. In 1977, she reviewed restaurants for the Connecticut supplement to the New York Times.

== Awards and honors ==
In 2000 Jeri Laber was honored by President Václav Havel of the Czech Republic who presented her with his country's Medal of Merit. In 2002 she testified against President Slobodan Milosevic at his war crimes trial in The Hague. In 2003 she was named Alumna of the Year by the Harriman Institute of Columbia University. The Association of American Publishers has named an award in her honor: The Jeri Laber International Freedom to Publish Award. Ms Laber is the recipient of a research and writing grant from the MacArthur Foundation. She is a fellow of the American Academy of Arts and Sciences and a member of the New York City Council on Foreign Relations. She was a Board Member of PEN America from 2012-2018 and its Vice-President from 2013-2015.

== Education ==
Laber was educated in New York City. She completed her undergraduate work at New York University, majoring in English and Philosophy. She did her graduate work at Columbia University, working simultaneously in the Russian Institute and the Department of Slavic Languages. Her graduate thesis was on "The Post-War Conception of Socialist Realism."

== Personal ==
She was married to Austin Laber, an attorney, from 1954-1982. In 1994 she married Charles Kuskin, oboist and composer, who died in 2015. She has three married daughters, two married stepchildren, eleven grandchildren and five great-grandchildren.
