= Nancy Lubin =

American non-profit writer

Nancy Lubin is president of JNA Associates, Inc., a research and consulting firm on the former USSR, especially the Caucasus and Central Asia.

She holds a PhD from Oxford University (St Antony's College, 1976–1981); a BA, magna cum laude, from Harvard University (1976); studied in Moscow and Leningrad; and was one of the first Westerners to conduct research in Central Asia for a year, at Tashkent State University, Uzbekistan (1978/79), where she documented deep institutional corruption and its political and economic impacts. She has traveled to this region many times since.

Lubin's interest in the former Soviet Union began during her college years at Harvard University, where she created an undergraduate "Special Concentration" in Soviet Studies and became particularly interested in the southern regions of the USSR. She spent one semester, 1974, studying in Leningrad (now Saint Petersburg), and published on population policies in the USSR and the rapid growth of the Central Asian and other minority populations in the Soviet Union's southern tier.

After earning her bachelor's degree, Lubin worked at Citizen Exchange Corps in NY, putting together and then leading the first group of American skiers and ski writers to ski at Cheget, in the Caucasus mountains near Mount Elbrus, the highest mountain on the European continent. She then spent one year conducting research in Uzbekistan (1978–79) before completing her doctorate at Oxford in 1982. Her research focused on corruption and the informal political and economic system in Central Asia, and her resulting book was reviewed favorably in the New York Times Book Review and elsewhere.

After earning her doctorate, Lubin worked on Capitol Hill in Washington, D.C. as Soviet analyst and Project Director at the Congressional Office of Technology Assessment before joining the faculty of Carnegie Mellon University in the departments of Engineering and Public Policy, and of Social and Applied History. Throughout the 1980s she also consulted widely for a range of foundations, international organizations and US governmental agencies on, and in, Central Asia, the Caucasus, and Russia, and was often quoted in the press.

The collapse of the USSR in 1991 led Lubin to found JNA Associates Inc., a research and consulting firm that focuses on Central Asia and the Caucasus region. She has consulted for over 80 private foundations, international donors/ financial institutions, US government agencies and contractors, the media, and other private industry ranging from Fortune 100 corporations to small non-profits. Her cross-sectoral work, largely focused on corruption and navigating these informal economic and political systems, includes designing, negotiating, implementing and evaluating projects and joint ventures on the ground; conducting political risk assessments, survey research and other analyses; consulting on television and film productions; and advising corporations, donors, and legal counsel in the US, Europe and Japan. The latter includes work as an expert witness/ expert consultant for civil and criminal cases, including Foreign Corrupt Practices Act (FCPA) and other matters.

Her research includes her work as a fellow at the US Institute of Peace, Woodrow Wilson Center, and elsewhere; Director/ Principal Author of a Council on Foreign Relations project chaired by Senator Sam Nunn; consultant for ABC News & PBS documentaries; and author of books, articles and op-eds for publications as varied as the New York Times, GEO magazine, Reader's Digest, Newsday, and elsewhere. She has also provided her expertise on Russian and Central Asian affairs on camera and as a consultant for NPR, CNN, ABC News, and other media outlets.

She is a member of the Council on Foreign Relations, and has served on the Board of Trustees, Eurasia Foundation; the advisory board, Open Society Institute, Central Eurasia Project, and other non profit boards, and was Senior Consultant for International Relations and Engagement for CityDance, 2010.
