= Rudolf Höber =

German physician and physiologist

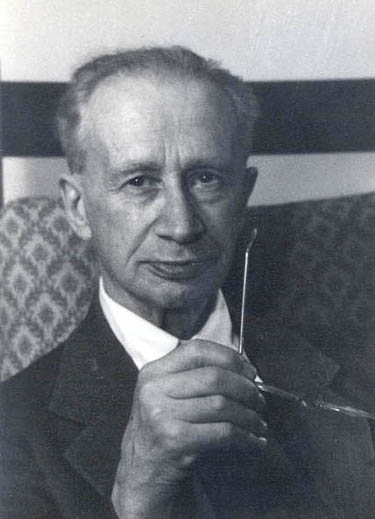
Dr. Rudolf Höber

Rudolf Otto Anselm Höber (27 December 1873, in Stettin, Germany – 5 September 1953, in Philadelphia, US) was a German physician and physiologist who was forced to emigrate from Nazi Germany.

== Life and work ==
Höber was born in Stettin to businessman Anselm Emil and his wife Elise née Köhlau. Educated at the gymnasium at Stettin, he went to study medicine in Freiburg im Breisgau in 1892. He completed studies at the University of Erlangen in 1897 and worked with his uncle Isidor Rosenthal where he became interested in physiology. He then studied the work of Walther Nernst on biological membranes. He received a degree in medicine in 1898 and joined the physiological institute at Zurich under Justus Gaule. He then received his habilitation in 1898 after working under Max von Frey. His 1902 work Physikalische Chemie der Zelle Und der Gewebe on the chemistry of cells and tissues made his well-known. He then worked at the Zurich Institute before moving to Kiel in 1909 becoming an assistant to Victor Hensen. He became an adjunct professor in 1910, working later, closely, with Albrecht Bethe who replaced Hensen. In 1915 Bethe moved to Frankfurt but Höber was initially rejected as the obvious senior to replace the position, possibly, because his wife was of Jewish origin. This decision was however recalled and he was made full professor and director on February 18, 1915, serving there until 1933. In 1930 he became rector for the Christian-Albrechts University, Kiel which led to his separation from research work. His support of liberal theologian Otto Baumgarten (1858–1934) who was opposed by the National Socialist student union led to being targeted. He was physically attacked in April 1933. He was forced to retire in September and he emigrated to England in October to work at the University of London. In December 1933 he received a position at the Pennsylvania Medical School and moved to the United States.

Höber married Josephine Marx (1876–1941) in 1901 who was also trained in medicine and collaborated with him in research.

== Publications ==
He wrote the book Lehrbuch der Physiologie des Menschen (Handbook for Human Physiology), Physikalische Chemie der Zelle Und der Gewebe (Physical Chemistry of Cells and Tissues), and he first hypothesized the beta dispersion in suspended red blood cells, later generalized to muscle tissue.
