= Lloyd Rudolph =

American political economist and political scientist

- Born: November 1, 1927; Chicago, Illinois, US
- Died: January 16, 2016 (aged 88); Oakland, California, US
- Occupations: Author, educationist, political thinker
- Spouse: Susanne Hoeber Rudolph
- Awards: Padma Bhushan; Professor Emeritus at the University of Chicago

Lloyd Irving Rudolph (November 1, 1927 – January 16, 2016) was an American political economist, political scientist, author, political thinker, educationist and the Professor Emeritus of Political Science at the University of Chicago, known for his scholarship and writings on the India social and political milieu. The Government of India, in 2014, honored Lloyd Rudolph and his wife, Susanne Hoeber Rudolph, for their services to literature and education, by bestowing on them the third highest civilian award, the Padma Bhushan.

== Biography ==
"In 1956, Susanne Rudolph and I drove to India from London in Land Rover and wrote our first book, The Modernity of Tradition.," wrote Lloyd Rudolph, "Have been teaching and writing about India ever since."

Lloyd Rudolph was born on November 1, 1927, to Norman Charles Rudolph and Bertha Margolin. He graduated with a BA in 1948 from Harvard University and continued at Harvard's Kennedy School of Government to secure his MPA in 1950. Six years later, in 1956, he obtained his PhD from Harvard University, itself, based on his thesis, The Meaning of Party: From the Politics of Status to the Politics of Opinion in Eighteenth Century England and America.

Rudolph joined the University of Chicago in 1964, where he served in various capacities for 34 years. He retired from the university and became professor emeritus in 2002.

Rudolph married Susanne Hoeber, his longtime friend, co-author and colleague, on July 19, 1952. The couple has three children, Jenny, Amelia and Matthew. The couple, after their retirement from the University of Chicago, alternates their residence in their homes in the US and Jaipur, India, where they have found a home in Jaipur. He died from prostate cancer on January 16, 2016.

== Career ==
"We've had a terrific time over the last 57 years, coming to and studying the country. Even our children can speak Hindi," says Lloyd Rudolph, "We had never imagined we would be felicitated by the government when we started our academic careers, but we are very happy about it."

Lloyd Rudolph started his career in 1948 when he was chosen as the group leader for a summer camp, Experiment in International Living, in France, which he attended once again in 1951. On his return from France, he enrolled as the research assistant to Bertram Gross, the executive director of Council of Economic Advisers, Executive Office of the President and worked there till 1949. The next assignment was as administrative assistant to Emil J. Sady, chief, Pacific Branch, Office of Territories, Department of the Interior.

His teaching career began in 1951, as teaching fellow, department of government, Harvard University. Till 1954, Rudolph continued as both resident and non-resident tutor there and followed it with a stint in the military, from 1954 to 1956, as the first lieutenant, U.S.A., Adjutant General's Corps. In 1956, he returned to teaching at Harvard as the instructor in 1957 at the department of government, Harvard University, and was promoted, 1960, as the Allston Burr senior tutor at the Dunster House of the university. In 1964, he became the associate professor of political science and the social sciences, department of political science and the college at the University of Chicago, promoted as professor in 1972 and retired from there in 2002. On his retirement, he was made the professor emeritus of political science.

== Positions held ==
- Chair of the Committee on International Relations — University of Chicago
- Master of Arts programme in the social Sciences — University of Chicago
- Chair of concentrations in Political Science, Public Policy, International Studies and South Asian Studies — University of Chicago
- Chairman - Leonard D. White Award Committee, American Political Science Association, 1969
- Member — Group for the Study of the Psycho-Historical Process, 1966–68
- Member — Discussion Group on South Asia, Council on Foreign Relations, 1971–72
- Member — Overseers Visiting Committee, Department of Government, Harvard University, 1978–81
- Member — Study Group on Nuclear Proliferation in South Asia, Carnegie Endowment for International Peace, Washington, D.C., 1987–88
- Member — Contemporary Affairs Advisory Committee, Asia Society, 1989–92
- Member — The Association for Asian Studies
- Member - Council on Foreign Relations (New York)
- Member — Chicago Council on Foreign Relations

== Legacy ==
Lloyd and Susanne Rudolph's associations with the University of Chicago and India have assisted in the university's decision to open a major academic centre in New Delhi. The centre is envisaged to act as a platform for mutual support and collaboration between students and scholars from India and Chicago in the areas of academics and research.

== Awards and recognition ==
- Padma Bhushan - 2014
- Professor Emeritus of the University of Chicago
- India Abroad Friend of India Award -

== Works ==
Lloyd Rudolph published eight books, all co-authored with his wife, Susanne Rudolph. The writings of the duo were compiled by Oxford University Press, in 2008, into a three-volume publication under the name, Explaining Indian Democracy: A Fifty-Year Perspective.

- Lloyd Rudolph; Susanne Rudolph (January 24, 2008). Explaining Indian Democracy: A Fifty-Year Perspective. Oxford University Press. ISBN 978-0195693652.

The other major works by Lloyd Rudolph are:

- Lloyd Rudolph; Susanne Rudolph (October 10, 2006). Postmodern Gandhi and Other Essays — Gandhi in the World and at Home. University of Chicago Press. ISBN 978-0226731247.
- Lloyd Rudolph; Susanne Rudolph (November 22, 1996). Transnational Religion and Fading States. Westview Press. ISBN 978-0813327686.
- Lloyd Rudolph; Susanne Rudolph (2008). "Education and Politics in India". British Journal of Educational Studies. British Journal of Educational Studies. ISSN 0007-1005.
- Lloyd Rudolph; Susanne Rudolph (April 15, 1987). In Pursuit of Lakshmi: the Political Economy of the Indian State. University of Chicago Press. ISBN 978-0226731391.
- Lloyd Rudolph; Susanne Rudolph (March 1, 1985). Essays on Rajputana: Reflections on History, Culture and Administration. University of Chicago Press. ISBN 978-0391031296.
- Susanne Rudolph; Lloyd Rudolph; Mohan Singh Kanota; Amar Singh (November 14, 1999). Reversing the Gaze: Amar Singh's Diary — A Colonial Subject's Narrative of Imperial India. Basic Books. ISBN 978-0391031296.
- Lloyd Rudolph; Susanne Rudolph (May 25, 2008). Making U.S. Foreign Policy Toward South Asia: Regional Imperatives and the Imperial Presidency. Indiana University Press. ISBN 978-0253220004.
- Lloyd Rudolph; Susanne Rudolph (July 15, 1984). The Modernity of Tradition: Political Development in India. University of Chicago Press. ISBN 978-0226731377.

Lloyd Rudolph wrote articles prolifically on India and political science, in general. These include:

- Rudolph, Lloyd I.; Rudolph, Susanne Hoeber (January 28, 2009). "India's Election: Backing into the Future". Foreign Affairs. 55 (July 1977).
- Lloyd Rudolph; Kurt Jacobsen (2006). "Experiencing the State editor". Oxford University Press. Archived from the original on August 7, 2016.
- Lloyd Rudolph (2005). Kristen Monroe (ed.). ""Let a Hundred Flowers Bloom, Let a Hundred Schools of Thought Contend: Arguments for Pluralism and against Monopoly in Political Science," in Perestroika! The Raucous Rebellion in Political Science". Yale University Press. Archived from the original on August 7, 2016.
- Lloyd Rudolph (2005). Kristen Monroe (ed.). ""Introducing Democracy into the APSA: The Case for Member Sovereignty and Constituency Representation," in Perestroika! The Raucous Rebellion in Political Science". Yale University Press. Archived from the original on August 7, 2016.
- Lloyd Rudolph; Susanne Rudolph (2003). "Engaging Subjective Knowledge: How Amar Sing's Diary Narratives of and by the Self Help Explain Identity Politics". Yale University Press. Archived from the original on August 7, 2016.
- Lloyd Rudolph; Susanne Rudolph (2003). Jos Gommans; Om Prakash (eds.). "Writing and Reading Tod's Rajasthan: Interpreting the Text and Its Historiography". Oxford University Press. Archived from the original on August 7, 2016.
- Lloyd Rudolph; Susanne Rudolph (2003). Carolyn M. Elliott (ed.). "The Coffee House and the Ashram: Gandhi, Civil Society, and Public Spheres". Oxford University Press. Archived from the original on August 7, 2016.
- Lloyd Rudolph; Susanne Rudolph (January 2002). "South Asia Faces the Future: New Dimensions of Indian Democracy". Journal of Democracy. XIII (1): 52–56. doi:10.1353/jod.2002.0015. Archived from the original on August 7, 2016.
- Lloyd Rudolph; Susanne Rudolph (2002). Richard A. Shweder; Martha Minow; Hazel Rose Markus (eds.). "Living with Multiculturalism: Universalism and Particularism in an Indian Historical Context". Engaging Cultural Differences: The Multicultural Challenges in Liberal Democracies. Russell Sage Foundation.
- Lloyd Rudolph; Susanne Rudolph (2001). Atul Kohli (ed.). "Redoing the Constitutional Design: From an Interventionist to a Regulatory State". The Success of India's Democracy. Cambridge University Press. Archived from the original on August 7, 2016.
- Lloyd Rudolph; Susanne Rudolph (2001). "The Iconisation of Chandrababu: Sharing Sovereignty in India's Federal Market Economy". Economic and Political Weekly. Archived from the original on August 7, 2016.
- Lloyd Rudolph; Susanne Rudolph (2001). Gerald James Larson (ed.). "Living With Difference in India; Legal Pluralism and Legal Universalism in Historical Context". Religion and Personal Law in Secular India: A Call to Judgment. Indiana University Press. Archived from the original on August 7, 2016.
- Lloyd Rudolph; Susanne Rudolph (2000). "Self Constructing Culture; Ethnography of the Amar Singh Diary". Economic and Political Weekly. Archived from the original on August 7, 2016.
- Lloyd Rudolph (1994). The Idea of Rajasthan. Delhi: Manohar. Archived from the original on August 7, 2016.
- Lloyd Rudolph; Susanne Rudolph (1993). Modern Hate: How Ancient Animosities Get Invented. Delhi. Archived from the original on August 7, 2016.
- Lloyd Rudolph (1984). Cultural Policy in India. Chanakya Publications. Archived from the original on August 7, 2016.
- Lloyd Rudolph; Susanne Rudolph (1983). Gandhi: The Traditional Roots of Charisma. University of Chicago Press. Archived from the original on August 7, 2016.
- Lloyd Rudolph (February 1986). "The East Psychoanalyzed review of Lucian W. Pye and Mary W. Pye". Asian Power and Politics: The Cultural Dimensions of Authority in the New York Times Book Review. Archived from the original on August 7, 2016.
