= 1847 in the United States =

- Decades: 1820s; 1830s; 1840s; 1850s; 1860s
- See also: History of the United States (1789–1849); Timeline of United States history (1820–1859); List of years in the United States

Events from the year 1847 in the United States.

== Incumbents ==
=== Federal government ===
- President: James K. Polk (D-Tennessee)
- Vice President: George M. Dallas (D-Pennsylvania)
- Chief Justice: Roger B. Taney (Maryland)
- Speaker of the House of Representatives:

John Wesley Davis (D-Indiana) (until March 4)
Robert Charles Winthrop (W-Massachusetts) (starting December 6)

- Congress: 29th (until March 4), 30th (starting March 4)

==== State governments ====
Governors and lieutenant governors

=== Governors ===
- Governor of Alabama: Joshua L. Martin (Independent) (until December 16), Reuben Chapman (Democratic) (starting December 16)
- Governor of Arkansas: Thomas Stevenson Drew (Democratic)
- Governor of Connecticut: Isaac Toucey (Democratic) (until May 5), Clark Bissell (Whig) (starting May 5)
- Governor of Delaware: William Temple (Whig) (until January 19), William Tharp (Democratic) (starting January 19)
- Governor of Florida: William Dunn Moseley (Democratic)
- Governor of Georgia: George W. Crawford (Whig) (until November 3), George W. Towns (Democratic) (starting November 3)
- Governor of Illinois: Augustus C. French (Democratic)
- Governor of Indiana: James Whitcomb (Democratic)
- Governor of Iowa: Ansel Briggs (Democratic)
- Governor of Kentucky: William Owsley (Whig)
- Governor of Louisiana: Alexandre Mouton (Democratic) (until February 12), Isaac Johnson (Democratic) (starting February 12)
- Governor of Maine: Hugh J. Anderson (Democratic) (until May 12), John W. Dana (Democratic) (starting May 12)
- Governor of Maryland: Thomas Pratt (Democratic)
- Governor of Massachusetts: George N. Briggs (Democratic)
- Governor of Michigan: Alpheus Felch (Democratic) (until March 3), William L. Greenly (Democratic) (starting March 3)
- Governor of Mississippi: Albert G. Brown (Democratic)
- Governor of Missouri: John C. Edwards (Democratic)
- Governor of New Hampshire: Anthony Colby (Democratic) (until June 3), Jared W. Williams (Democratic) (starting June 3)
- Governor of New Jersey: Charles C. Stratton (Whig)
- Governor of New York: John Young (Whig) (starting January 1)
- Governor of North Carolina: William Alexander Graham (Whig)
- Governor of Ohio: William Bebb (Whig)
- Governor of Pennsylvania: Francis R. Shunk (Democratic)
- Governor of Rhode Island: Byron Diman (Law and Order) (until May 4), Elisha Harris (Law and Order) (starting May 4)
- Governor of South Carolina: David Johnson (Democratic)
- Governor of Tennessee: Aaron V. Brown (Democratic) (until October 17), Neill S. Brown (Whig) (starting October 17)
- Governor of Texas: James Pinckney Henderson (Democratic) (until December 21), George T. Wood (Democratic) (starting December 21)
- Governor of Vermont: Horace Eaton (Whig)
- Governor of Virginia: William Smith (Democratic)

=== Lieutenant governors ===
- Lieutenant Governor of Connecticut: Noyes Billings (Democratic) (until May 5), Charles J. McCurdy (Whig) (starting May 5)
- Lieutenant Governor of Illinois: Joseph Wells (Democratic)
- Lieutenant Governor of Indiana: Paris C. Dunning (Democratic)
- Lieutenant Governor of Kentucky: Archibald Dixon (Whig)
- Lieutenant Governor of Louisiana: Trasimond Landry (Whig)
- Lieutenant Governor of Massachusetts: John Reed, Jr. (political party unknown)
- Lieutenant Governor of Michigan: William L. Greenly (Democratic) (until month and day unknown), Charles P. Bush (Democratic) (starting month and day unknown)
- Lieutenant Governor of Missouri: James Young (Democratic)
- Lieutenant Governor of New York: Addison Gardiner (Democratic) (until July 5), Albert Lester (Democratic) (starting July 5)
- Lieutenant Governor of Rhode Island: Elisha Harris (Whig) (until May 4), Edward W. Lawton (political party unknown) (starting May 4)
- Lieutenant Governor of South Carolina: William Cain (Democratic)
- Lieutenant Governor of Texas: Albert Clinton Horton (Democratic) (until December 21), John Alexander Greer (political party unknown) (starting December 21)
- Lieutenant Governor of Vermont: Leonard Sargeant (Whig)

== Events ==
=== January–March ===
- January 4 – Samuel Colt sells his first revolver pistol, the Colt Walker, to the U.S. government for the Texas Rangers.
- January 13 – The Treaty of Cahuenga ends the fighting in the Mexican–American War in California.
- January 16 – John C. Fremont is appointed Governor of the new California Territory.
- January 17 – Saint Anthony Hall is founded at Columbia University in New York City.
- January 30 – Yerba Buena, California is renamed San Francisco, California.
- February 5 – A rescue effort, called the First Relief, leaves Johnson's Ranch to save the ill-fated Donner Party. These California bound emigrants became snowbound in the Sierra Nevada in the winter of 1846–1847, and some have resorted to cannibalism to survive.
- February 22 – Mexican–American War – The Battle of Buena Vista: 5,000 American troops under General Zachary Taylor use their superiority in artillery to drive off 15,000 Mexican troops under Antonio López de Santa Anna, defeating the Mexicans the next day.
- March 1 – The state of Michigan formally abolishes the death penalty.
- March 9 – Mexican–American War: United States forces under General Winfield Scott invade Mexico near Veracruz in the first large-scale amphibious assault conducted by U.S. military forces.
- March 28 – The Massachusetts Donation of 1847 for Ireland sails from Boston on USS Jamestown.
- March 29 – Mexican–American War: United States forces led by General Winfield Scott take Veracruz after a siege.

=== April–June ===
- May 7 – The American Medical Association (AMA) is founded in Philadelphia.
- June 1 – Zeta Psi fraternity of North America is founded at New York University.
- June 10 – The Chicago Tribune begins publication.

=== July–September ===
- July 1 – The United States issues its first postage stamps, featuring George Washington and Benjamin Franklin.
- July 24 – After 17 months of travel, Brigham Young leads 148 Mormon pioneers into Salt Lake Valley, resulting in the establishment of Salt Lake City.
- July 29 – The Cumberland School of Law is founded at Cumberland University in Lebanon, Tennessee. At the end of 1847 only 15 law schools exist in the United States.
- August 12 – U.S. troops of General Winfield Scott begin to advance along the aqueduct around Lake Chalco and Lake Xochimilco in Mexico
- August 20 – U.S. troops defeat Mexican troops in Valencia, Mexico

=== October–December ===
- October 31 – Theta Delta Chi is founded as a social fraternity at Union College, Schenectady, New York.
- November 29 – The Whitman massacre: Oregon missionaries Dr. Marcus Whitman, his wife Narcissa, and eleven others are killed in the Oregon Country by Cayuse and Umatilla Indians, starting the Cayuse War.

=== Undated ===
- The North Carolina General Assembly incorporates the railroad town of Goldsborough, and the Wayne county seat is moved to the new town.
- The candy Necco Wafers are first produced as "hub wafers" in New England, an origin of the candy industry.
- Hardware business Orgill is established in Memphis, Tennessee.

=== Ongoing ===
- Mexican–American War (1846–1848)

== Births ==
- January 11
  - Alpheus Michael Bowman, politician and businessman (died 1913)
  - Marion McKinley Bovard, academic administrator, 1st president of the University of Southern California (died 1891)
- January 16 – John Cutting Berry, physician and missionary (died 1936)
- January 23 – Elijah Bond, lawyer and inventor (died 1921)
- January 28 – William V. Allen, United States Senator from Nebraska from 1893 till 1899. (died 1924)
- February 2 – Charles H. Baker, politician (died 1919)
- February 11 – Thomas Edison, American inventor and businessman (died 1931)
- February 26 – William A. B. Branch, politician (died 1910)
- March 2 – Blanche Butler Ames, First Lady of Mississippi (d. 1939)
- March 13 – Francis S. White, United States Senator from Alabama from 1914 till 1915. (died 1922)
- March 18 – William O'Connell Bradley, United States Senator from Kentucky from 1895 till 1899. (died 1914)
- March 21 – Oscar Bielaski, Major League Baseball player (died 1911)
- March 27 – Warren Ives Bradley, children's author (died 1868)
- March 29 – John D. Works, United States Senator from California from 1911 till 1917. (died 1928)
- April 13 – J. Thompson Baker, politician from New Jersey (died 1919)
- May 25 – John Green Brady, 5th Governor of the District of Alaska from 1897 till 1906 (d. 1918)
- June 8 – Ida Saxton McKinley, First Lady of the United States, (died 1907)
- June 26 – Daniel V. Asay, iceboat racer (died 1930)
- June 29 – Brother Azarias, educator (d. 1893)
- July 4 – James Anthony Bailey, circus ringmaster (d. 1906)
- July 19 – Oliver Ernesto Branch, politician (d. 1916)
- August 12 – William Rankin Ballard, businessman (d. 1929)
- September 5 – Jesse James, American outlaw, guerrilla, gang leader, bank robber, train robber, and murderer from Missouri. (died 1882)
- September 10 – Franklin Bartlett, politician (died 1909)
- September 11 – Mary Watson Whitney, American astronomer and academic (died 1921)
- September 23 – Victoria Woodhull, American leader of the woman's suffrage movement (died 1927)
- September 30 – James Taliaferro, United States Senator from Florida from 1899 till 1911. (died 1934)
- October 18 – Emma Elizabeth Brown, author and artist (unknown year of death)
- October 23 – Gottfried Blocklinger, admiral (died 1930)
- October 31 – Wendell P. Bowman, army major general (died 1928)
- November 7 – Melvin O. Adams, attorney and railroad executive (died 1920)
- November 10 – Frederick Arthur Bridgman, artist (died 1928)
- November 23 – Joseph Ackroyd, politician, member of the New York State Senate (died 1915)
- December 21 – Fletcher S. Bassett, founder of the Chicago Folk-Lore Society (died 1893)
- December 30 – John Peter Altgeld, 20th governor of Illinois (died 1902)
- December 31 – Wilson S. Bissell, politician, United States Postmaster General (died 1903)

== Deaths ==
- January 19 – Charles Bent, first civilian governor of the New Mexico territory (born 1799)
- January 30 – Virginia Eliza Clemm Poe, wife of Edgar Allan Poe (born 1822)
- May 1 – Jesse Speight, United States Senator from Mississippi (1845–1847) (born 1795)
- July 22 – Henry W. Edwards, United States Senator from Connecticut (1823–1838) (born 1779)
- August 6 – Henry M. Ridgely, United States Senator from Delaware (1827–1829) (born 1779)
- November 1 – Jabez W. Huntington, United States Senator from Connecticut (1840–1847) (born 1788)
- November 29 – Narcissa Whitman, pioneer missionary (born 1808)

== See also ==
- Timeline of United States history (1820–1859)
