= 1936 in the United States =

- Decades: 1910s; 1920s; 1930s; 1940s; 1950s
- See also: History of the United States (1918–1945); Timeline of United States history (1930–1949); List of years in the United States

Events from the year 1936 in the United States.

== Incumbents ==
=== Federal government ===
- President: Franklin D. Roosevelt (D-New York)
- Vice President: John Nance Garner (D-Texas)
- Chief Justice: Charles Evans Hughes (New York)
- Speaker of the House of Representatives:

Joseph W. Byrns, Sr. (D-Tennessee) (until June 4)
William B. Bankhead (D-Alabama) (starting June 4)

- Senate Majority Leader: Joseph Taylor Robinson (D-Arkansas)
- Congress: 74th

==== State governments ====
Governors and lieutenant governors

=== Governors ===
- Governor of Alabama: Bibb Graves (Democratic)
- Governor of Arizona: Benjamin Baker Moeur (Democratic)
- Governor of Arkansas: Junius Marion Futrell (Democratic)
- Governor of California: Frank Merriam (Republican)
- Governor of Colorado: Edwin C. Johnson (Democratic)
- Governor of Connecticut: Wilbur Lucius Cross (Democratic)
- Governor of Delaware: C. Douglass Buck (Republican)
- Governor of Florida: David Sholtz (Democratic)
- Governor of Georgia: Eugene Talmadge (Democratic)
- Governor of Idaho: C. Ben Ross (Democratic)
- Governor of Illinois: Henry Horner (Democratic)
- Governor of Indiana: Paul V. McNutt (Democratic)
- Governor of Iowa: Clyde L. Herring (Democratic)
- Governor of Kansas: Alfred M. Landon (Republican)
- Governor of Kentucky: Happy Chandler (Democratic)
- Governor of Louisiana:
  - until January 28: Oscar K. Allen (Democratic)
  - January 28-May 12: James Albert Noe (Democratic)
  - starting May 12: Richard W. Leche (Democratic)
- Governor of Maine: Louis J. Brann (Democratic)
- Governor of Maryland: Harry W. Nice (Republican)
- Governor of Massachusetts: James Michael Curley (Democratic)
- Governor of Michigan: Frank Fitzgerald (Republican)
- Governor of Minnesota: Floyd B. Olson (Farmer-Labor) (until August 22), Hjalmar Petersen (Farmer-Labor) (starting August 22)
- Governor of Mississippi:
  - until January 21: Martin Sennett Conner (Democratic)
  - January 21-26: vacant
  - starting January 26: Hugh L. White (Democratic)
- Governor of Missouri: Guy Brasfield Park (Democratic)
- Governor of Montana: Elmer Holt (Democratic)
- Governor of Nebraska: Robert Leroy Cochran (Democratic)
- Governor of Nevada: Richard Kirman, Sr. (Democratic)
- Governor of New Hampshire: Styles Bridges (Republican)
- Governor of New Jersey: Harold G. Hoffman (Republican)
- Governor of New Mexico: Clyde Tingley (Democratic)
- Governor of New York: Herbert H. Lehman (Democratic)
- Governor of North Carolina: John C. B. Ehringhaus (Democratic)
- Governor of North Dakota: Walter Welford (Republican)
- Governor of Ohio: Martin L. Davey (Democratic)
- Governor of Oklahoma: Ernest W. Marland (Democratic)
- Governor of Oregon: Charles H. Martin (Democratic)
- Governor of Pennsylvania: George Howard Earle III (Democratic)
- Governor of Rhode Island: Theodore Francis Green (Democratic)
- Governor of South Carolina: Olin D. Johnston (Democratic)
- Governor of South Dakota: Tom Berry (Democratic)
- Governor of Tennessee: Harry Hill McAlister (Democratic)
- Governor of Texas: James V. Allred (Democratic)
- Governor of Utah: Henry H. Blood (Democratic)
- Governor of Vermont: Charles M. Smith (Republican)
- Governor of Virginia: George C. Peery (Democratic)
- Governor of Washington: Clarence D. Martin (Democratic)
- Governor of West Virginia: Herman G. Kump (Democratic)
- Governor of Wisconsin: Philip La Follette (Wisconsin Progressive)
- Governor of Wyoming: Leslie A. Miller (Democratic)

=== Lieutenant governors ===
- Lieutenant Governor of Alabama: Thomas E. Knight (Democratic)
- Lieutenant Governor of Arkansas: William Lee Cazort (Democratic)
- Lieutenant Governor of California: George J. Hatfield (Republican)
- Lieutenant Governor of Colorado: Raymond Herbert Talbot (Democratic)
- Lieutenant Governor of Connecticut: T. Frank Hayes (Democratic)
- Lieutenant Governor of Delaware: Roy F. Corley (Republican)
- Lieutenant Governor of Idaho: G. P. Mix (Democratic)
- Lieutenant Governor of Illinois: Thomas Donovan (Democratic)
- Lieutenant Governor of Indiana: M. Clifford Townsend (Democratic)
- Lieutenant Governor of Iowa: Nelson G. Kraschel (Democratic)
- Lieutenant Governor of Kansas: Charles W. Thompson (Republican)
- Lieutenant Governor of Kentucky: Keen Johnson (Democratic)
- Lieutenant Governor of Louisiana: James A. Noe (Democratic) (until May 12), Earl K. Long (Democratic) (starting May 12)
- Lieutenant Governor of Massachusetts: Joseph L. Hurley (Democratic)
- Lieutenant Governor of Michigan: Thomas Read (Republican)
- Lieutenant Governor of Minnesota: Hjalmar Petersen (Farmer Labor) (until August 24), William B. Richardson (Republican) (starting August 24)
- Lieutenant Governor of Mississippi: Dennis Murphree (Democratic) (until January 21), Jacob Buehler Snider (Democratic) (starting January 21)
- Lieutenant Governor of Missouri: Frank Gaines Harris (Democratic)
- Lieutenant Governor of Montana: William P. Pilgeram (Democratic)
- Lieutenant Governor of Nebraska: Walter H. Jurgensen (Democratic)
- Lieutenant Governor of Nevada: Fred S. Alward (political party unknown)
- Lieutenant Governor of New Mexico: Louis Cabeza de Baca (Democratic)
- Lieutenant Governor of New York: M. William Bray (Democratic)
- Lieutenant Governor of North Carolina: Alexander H. Graham (Democratic)
- Lieutenant Governor of North Dakota: vacant
- Lieutenant Governor of Ohio: Harold G. Mosier (Democratic)
- Lieutenant Governor of Oklahoma: James E. Berry (Democratic)
- Lieutenant Governor of Pennsylvania: Thomas Kennedy (Democratic)
- Lieutenant Governor of Rhode Island: Robert E. Quinn (Democratic)
- Lieutenant Governor of South Carolina: Joseph Emile Harley (Democratic)
- Lieutenant Governor of South Dakota: Robert Peterson (Democratic)
- Lieutenant Governor of Tennessee: William P. Moss (Democratic) (until month and day unknown), Bryan Pope (Democratic) (starting month and day unknown)
- Lieutenant Governor of Texas: Walter Frank Woodul (Democratic)
- Lieutenant Governor of Vermont: George D. Aiken (Republican)
- Lieutenant Governor of Virginia: James H. Price (Democratic)
- Lieutenant Governor of Washington: Victor A. Meyers (Democratic)
- Lieutenant Governor of Wisconsin: Thomas J. O'Malley (Democratic) (until May 27), vacant (starting May 27)

== Events ==
=== January–March ===
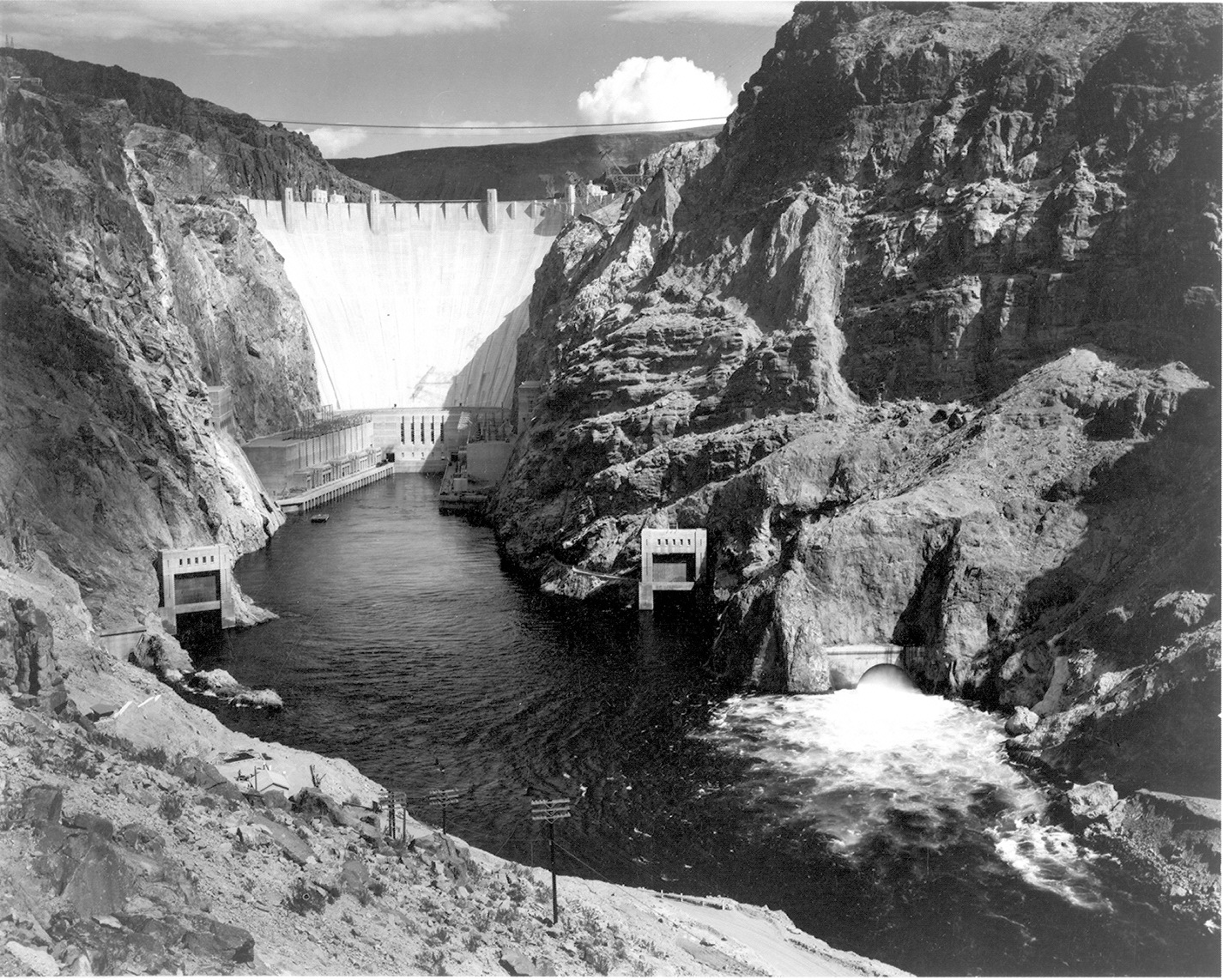
March 1: Hoover Dam completed.

- January 4 – Billboard magazine publishes its first music hit parade.
- January 15 – The first American building to be completely covered in glass is completed in Toledo, Ohio, for the Owens-Illinois Glass Company.
- February 17 – The first superhero to wear a skin-tight costume and mask, The Phantom, makes his appearance in U.S. newspapers.
- March – German American Bund formed in Buffalo, New York, in support of Nazi Germany to succeed the Friends of New Germany, with German-born American citizen Fritz Julius Kuhn elected as its first leader.
- March 1 – Construction of Hoover Dam is completed.
- March 5 – The 8th Academy Awards, hosted by Frank Capra, are presented at Biltmore Hotel in Los Angeles, with Frank Lloyd's Mutiny on the Bounty winning the Academy Award for Outstanding Production. The film receives the most nominations with eight, while John Ford's The Informer wins the most awards with four, including Best Director for Ford.
- March 17–18 – Pittsburgh Flood of 1936 ("St. Patrick's Day Flood"): Pittsburgh, Pennsylvania, suffers the worst flooding in its history.
- March 26 – The longest game in the history of the National Hockey League is played. The Montreal Maroons and Detroit Red Wings are scoreless until 16½ minutes into the sixth overtime when Mud Bruneteau ends it at 2:25 am.

=== April–June ===
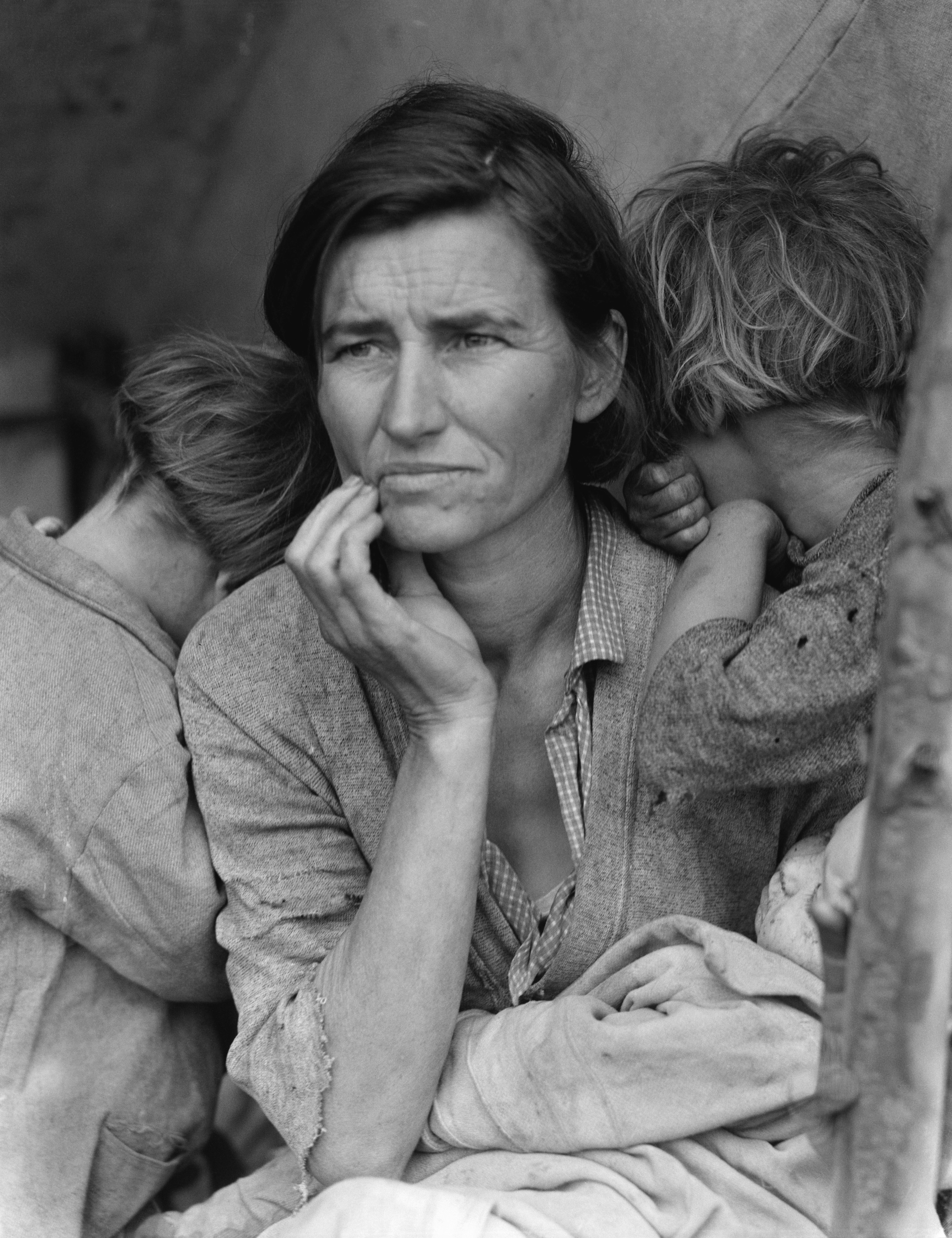
March: "Migrant Mother", an iconic photo taken by Dorothea Lange

- April 3 – Richard Hauptmann, convicted of the Lindbergh kidnapping and murder in 1932, is executed by electrocution in New Jersey State Prison.
- April 5 – A tornado hits Tupelo, Mississippi, killing 216 and injuring over 700 (the 4th deadliest tornado in U.S. history).
- May – Lawrence Warehouse Company, based in San Francisco, California has an initial public stock offering.
- May 12 – The Santa Fe railroad inaugurates the all-Pullman Super Chief passenger train between Chicago and Los Angeles.
- May 25 – Remington Rand strike of 1936–37 begins.
- June
  - A major heat wave strikes North America; high temperature records are set and thousands die.
  - The first production model PCC streetcar, built by St. Louis Car Company, is placed in service by Pittsburgh Railways.
- June 7 – The Steel Workers Organizing Committee is founded.
- June 10 – Margaret Mitchell's epic historical romance Gone with the Wind is published.
- June 19 – Max Schmeling knocks out Joe Louis in the 12th round of their heavyweight boxing match at Yankee Stadium in New York City.
- June 29 – United States Maritime Commission is formed.

=== July–September ===
- July 11 – Triborough Bridge in New York City is opened to traffic.
- July 13–14 – Peak of 1936 North American heat wave: The U.S. states of Wisconsin, Michigan and Indiana all set new state records for high temperature. At Mio in northern Michigan, it soars to 113 °F (45 °C).
- August 3 – 1936 Summer Olympics in Berlin (Nazi Germany): African-American athlete Jesse Owens wins the 100-meter dash. He will be the most successful athlete to compete in these games, winning a total of four gold medals.
- August 14
  - Murderer Rainey Bethea is hanged in Owensboro, Kentucky, in the last public execution in the U.S.
  - 1936 Summer Olympics: The United States men's national basketball team wins its first ever Olympic basketball tournament in the final game over Canada, 19–8.

=== October–December ===
- October 6 – The New York Yankees defeat the New York Giants, 4 games to 2, to win their 5th World Series title in baseball.
- October 11 – Earl W. Bascom, rodeo cowboy and artist, designs and builds Mississippi's first permanent rodeo arena at Columbia, Mississippi.
- October 19 – Herbert R. Ekins, reporter for the New York World-Telegram, wins a race to travel around the world on commercial airline flights, beating Dorothy Kilgallen of the New York Journal and Leo Kieran of The New York Times. The flight takes 18½ days.
- October 29 – The historic Uptown Theater opens in Washington, D.C.
- November 3 – 1936 United States presidential election: Democrat Franklin D. Roosevelt is reelected to a second term in a landslide victory over Republican governor of Kansas Alf Landon.
- November 12 – In California, the San Francisco–Oakland Bay Bridge opens to traffic.
- November 23 – Life magazine begins publication as a weekly news magazine under the management of Henry Luce.
- November 25 – Volunteers who will join the XV International Brigade ("Abraham Lincoln Brigade") sail from New York City on their way to fight for the Republicans the Spanish Civil War.
- December 3 – Radio station WQXR is officially founded in New York City.
- December 29 – The United Auto Workers begins the Flint Sit-Down Strike in Flint, Michigan.

=== Undated ===
- The YMCA Youth and Government program is founded in Albany, New York.
- Society of American Archivists established.

=== Ongoing ===
- Lochner era (c. 1897–c. 1937)
- Dust Bowl (1930–1936)
- New Deal (1933–1939)

== Births ==
=== January ===
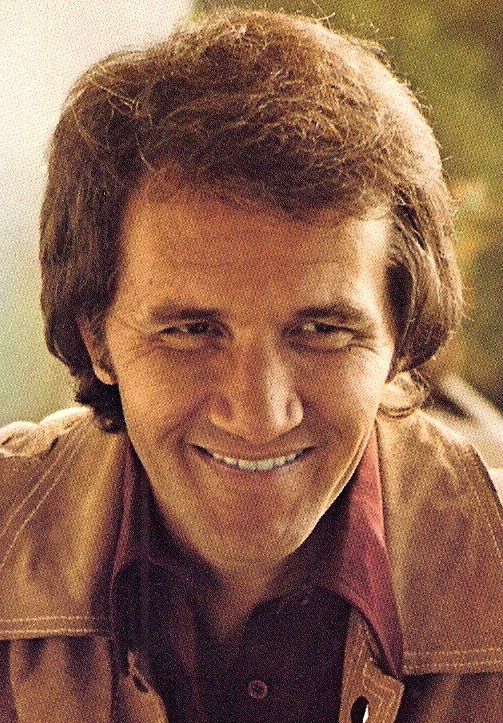
Roger Miller

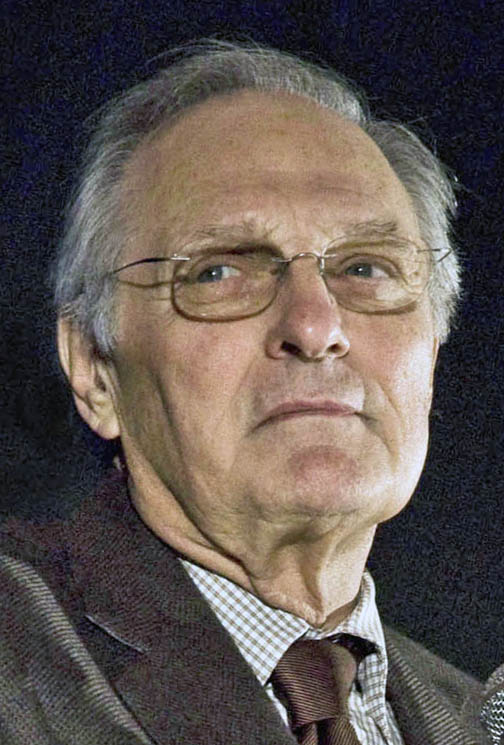
Alan Alda

- January 1
  - Don Nehlen, American football player and coach
  - James Sinegal, American billionaire, businessman and co-founder of Costco
  - Richard V. Allen, American public servant and national security advisor (d. 2024)
- January 2 – Roger Miller, American singer-songwriter, musician and actor (d. 1992)
- January 4 – Mike White, American football player and coach (d. 2025)
- January 5
  - Florence King, American novelist, essayist and columnist (d. 2013)
  - Daryl Robertson, American baseball player (d. 2018)
- January 6 – Darlene Hard, American professional tennis player (d. 2021)
- January 7 – G. Robert Blakey, American lawyer and academic
- January 9
  - Anne Rivers Siddons, American Southern novelist (d. 2019)
  - Ralph Terry, American baseball player (d. 2022)
- January 10
  - Stephen E. Ambrose, American historian and biographer (d. 2002)
  - Al Goldstein, American publisher and pornographer (d. 2013)
  - Robert Wilson, American physicist and radioastronomer, recipient of 2018 Nobel Prize in Physics
- January 14 – Clarence Carter, African-American soul musician
- January 23
  - Arlene Golonka, American actress (d. 2021)
  - Jerry Kramer, American football player
- January 27
  - Barry Barish, American gravitational physicist, recipient of 2017 Nobel Prize in Physics
  - Troy Donahue, American actor and singer (d. 2001)
  - Samuel C. C. Ting, American physicist
- January 28 – Alan Alda, American actor
- January 29 – James Jamerson, American bass guitarist (d. 1983)

=== February ===
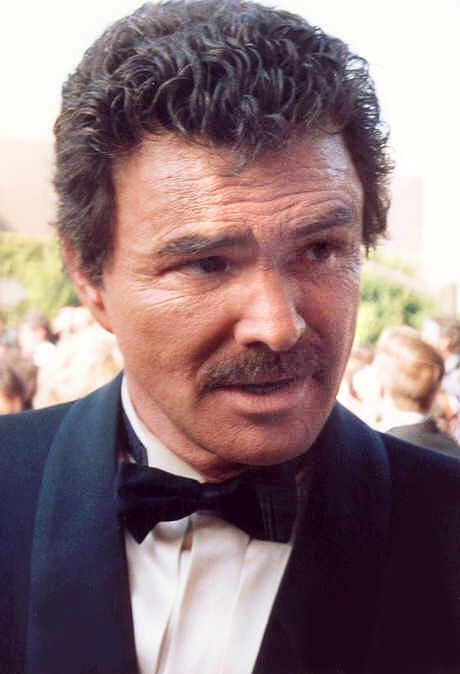
Burt Reynolds

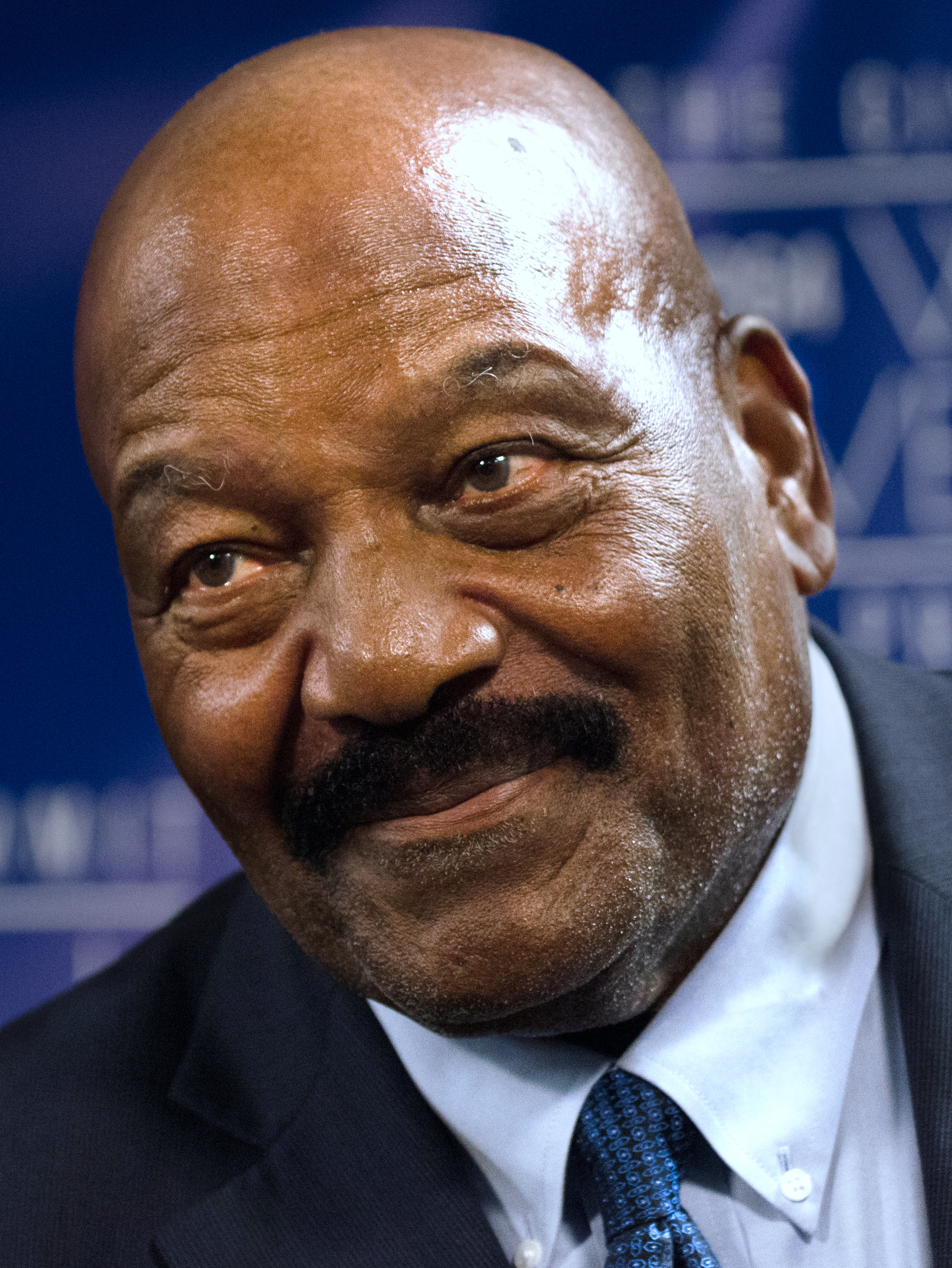
Jim Brown

- February 1 – Azie Taylor Morton, 35th Treasurer of the United States (d. 2003)
- February 2 – Martina Arroyo, African-American operatic soprano (d. 2026)
- February 3
  - Jeanine Basinger, American film historian
  - Jim Marshall, American photographer (d. 2010)
  - Elizabeth Peer, American journalist (d. 1984)
- February 4
  - David Brenner, American comedian (d. 2014)
  - Gary Conway, American actor
- February 6 – J. Howard Marshall III, American businessman
- February 8 – Larry Verne, American singer-songwriter (d. 2013)
- February 11
  - Russell Morash, American television producer and director (d. 2024)
  - Burt Reynolds, American actor, director and producer (d. 2018)
- February 12 – Joe Don Baker, American actor (d. 2025)
- February 14 – Andrew Prine, American actor (d. 2022)
- February 16 – Carl Icahn, American businessman, investor and philanthropist
- February 17 – Jim Brown, African-American football player and actor (d. 2023)
- February 19 – Sam Myers, American musician, songwriter (d. 2006)
- February 20
  - Larry Hovis, American actor (d. 2003)
  - Sharpe James, African-American politician, mayor of Newark (d. 2025)
- February 21 – Barbara Jordan, African-American lawyer, politician and civil rights campaigner (d. 1996)
- February 22
  - J. Michael Bishop, American immunologist and microbiologist (d. 2026)
  - Elizabeth MacRae, American actress (d. 2024)
- February 24 – Carol D'Onofrio, American public health researcher (d. 2020)
- February 27 – Roger Mahony, American cardinal
- February 29 – Alex Rocco, American actor (d. 2015)

=== March ===
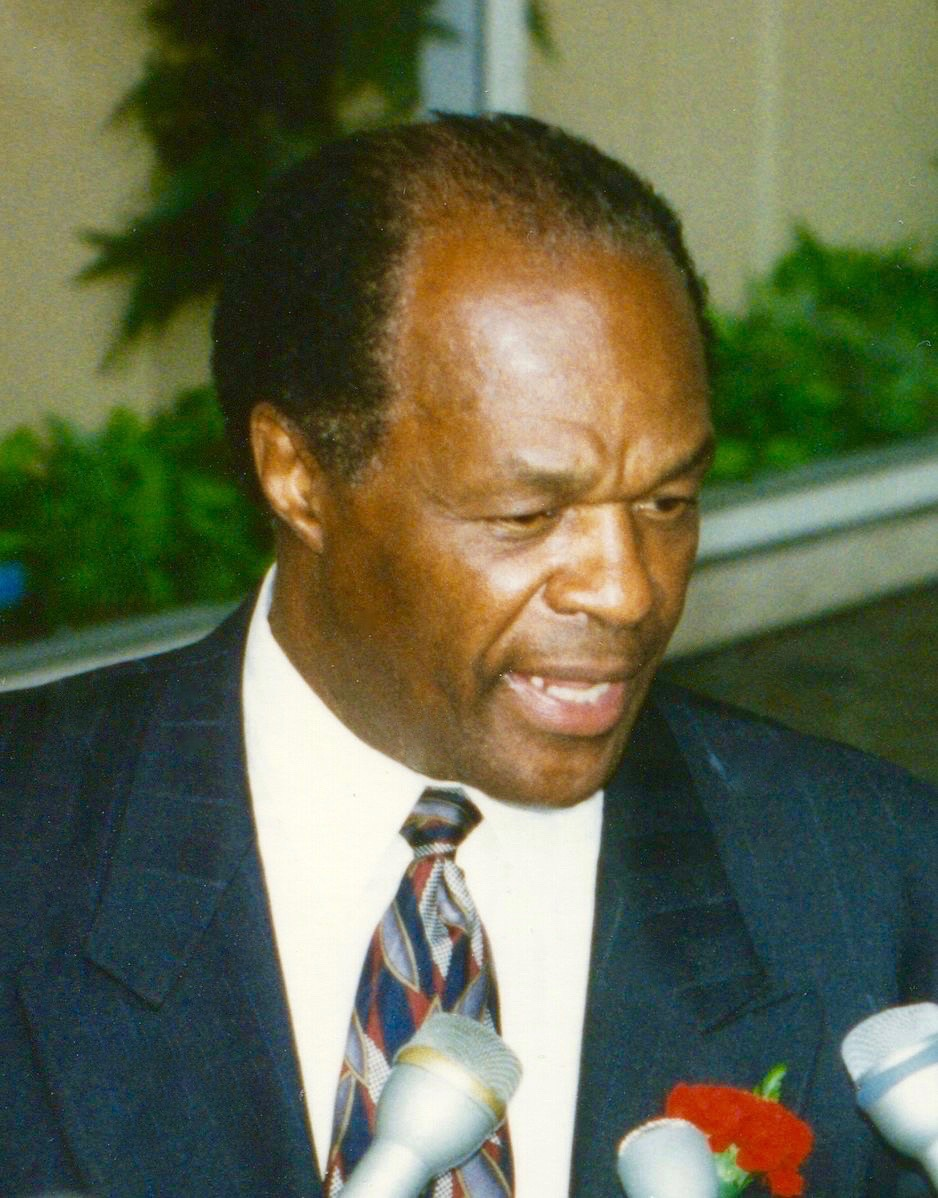
Marion Barry

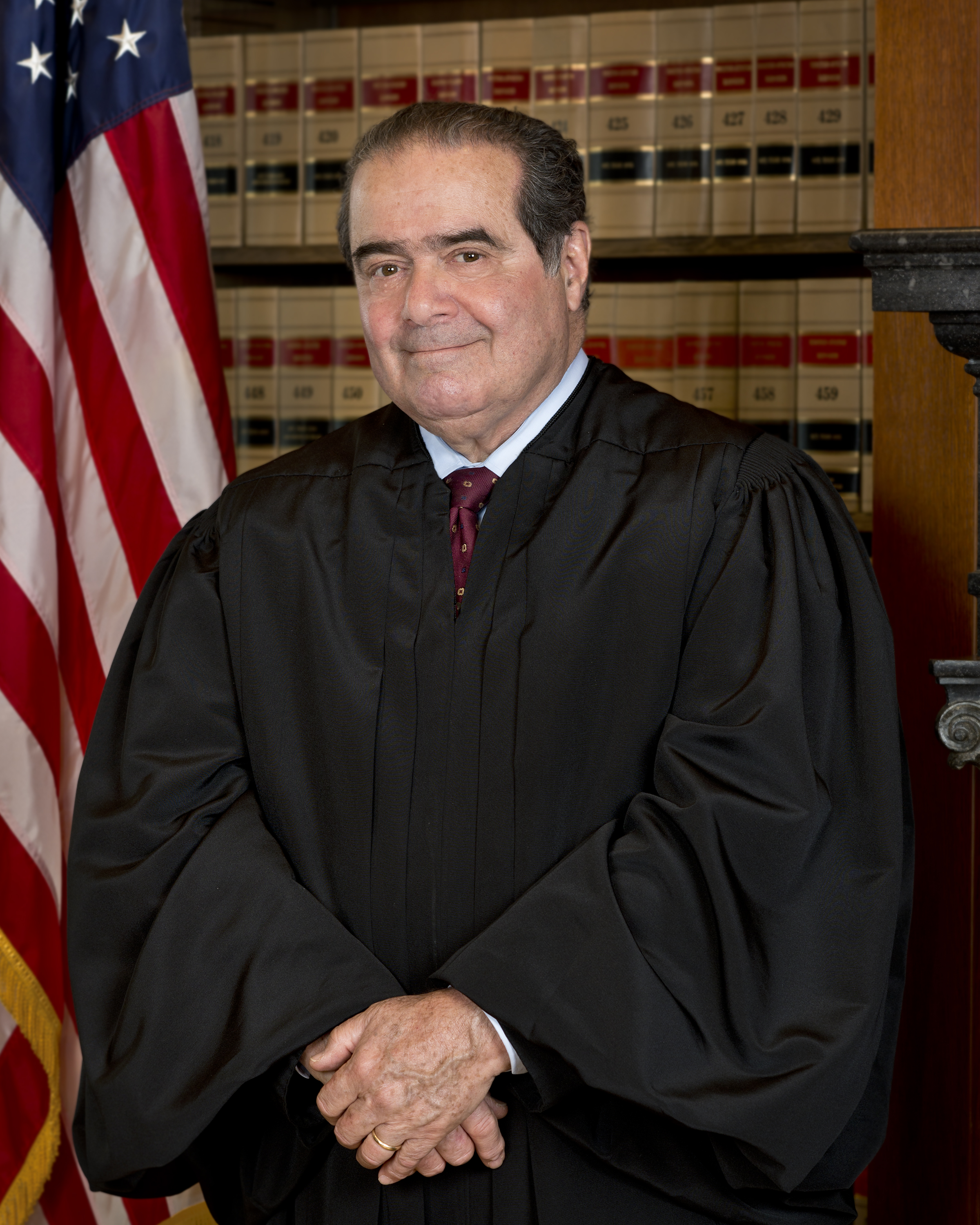
Antonin Scalia

- March 3 – Peter G. Davis, American opera and classical music critic (d. 2021)
- March 5 – Dean Stockwell, American actor (d. 2021)
- March 6 – Marion Barry, African-American politician and civil rights activist (d. 2014)
- March 7 – Loren Acton, American astronaut
- March 8
  - Sue Ane Langdon, American actress
  - Earl J. Silbert, American attorney (d. 2022)
- March 9
  - Mickey Gilley, American country singer and musician (d. 2022)
  - Marty Ingels, American actor and theatrical agent (d. 2015)
  - Tom Sestak, American football player (d. 1987)
- March 11 – Antonin Scalia, Associate Justice of the Supreme Court of the U.S. from 1986 to 2016 (d. 2016)
- March 12 – William Foege, American physician, epidemiologist (d. 2026)
- March 15
  - Howard Greenfield, American songwriter (d. 1986)
  - Don Sundquist, American businessman and politician, Governor of Tennessee from 1995 to 2003 (d. 2023)
  - Jerry Walsh, American basketball coach (d. 2025)
- March 16 – Raymond Damadian, Armenian-American MRI inventor (d, 2022)
- March 17
  - Patty Maloney, American actress (d. 2025)
  - Ken Mattingly, American astronaut (d. 2023)
- March 22 – Edith Grossman, American translator (d. 2023)
- March 24 – Don Covay, American singer-songwriter (d. 2015)
- March 26 – Harry Kalas, American sportscaster (d. 2009)
- March 28 – Bill Gaither, American singer-songwriter
- March 31
  - Marge Piercy, American poet, activist
  - Walter E. Williams, American economist (d. 2020)

=== April ===
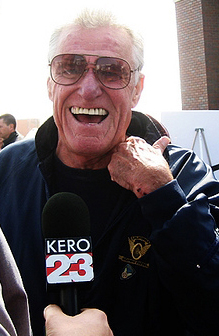
Charles Napier

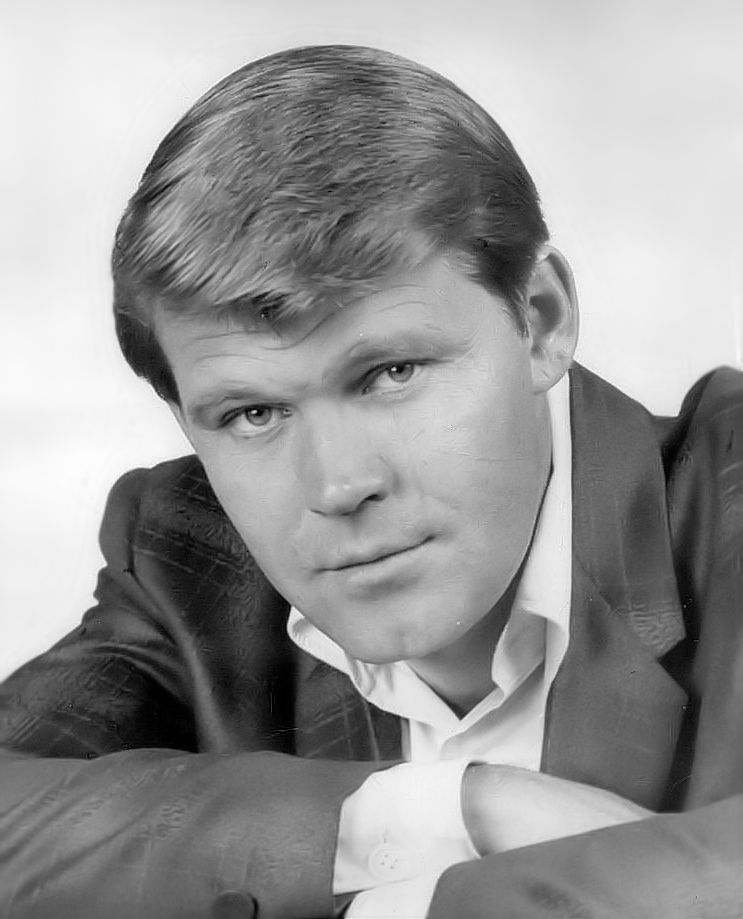
Glen Campbell

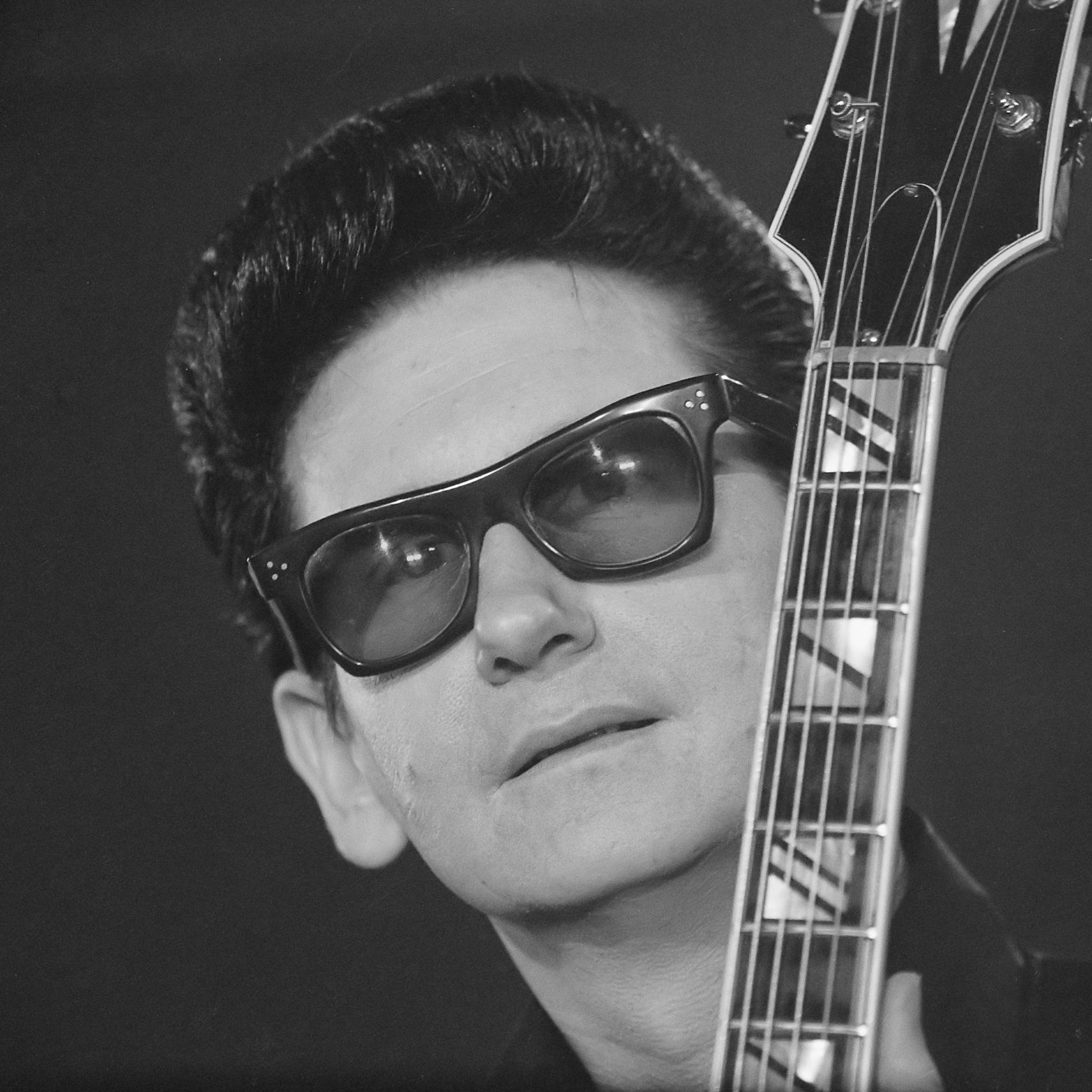
Roy Orbison

- April 3
  - Jerry Krause, American basketball coach (d. 2023)
  - Scott LaFaro, American jazz musician (d. 1961)
  - Jimmy McGriff, American jazz musician (d. 2008)
- April 9
  - Bob Albright, American politician (d. 2023)
  - Valerie Solanas, American radical feminist, attempted murderer of Andy Warhol (d. 1988)
- April 10
  - John Madden, American football player, coach and sportscaster (d. 2021)
  - Bobby Smith, American singer-songwriter (d. 2013)
- April 12 – Charles Napier, American actor (d. 2011)
- April 14
  - Bobby Nichols, American professional golfer
  - Frank Serpico, American police officer
- April 18
  - Roger Graef, American-born British theatre director and filmmaker (d. 2022)
  - Tommy Ivo, American actor, drag racer
  - Michael M. Thomas, American novelist and investment banker (d. 2021)
- April 19
  - Ruby Johnson, American singer (d. 1999)
  - Andy Romano, American actor (d. 2022)
- April 20 – Pat Roberts, American politician
- April 21
  - Bob Cleary, American ice hockey player (d. 2015)
  - James Dobson, American child psychologist, conservative evangelical political activist (d. 2025)
- April 22 – Glen Campbell, American musician and actor (d. 2017)
- April 23 – Roy Orbison, American singer-songwriter (d. 1988)
- April 24
  - Glen Hobbie, American baseball player (d. 2013)
  - Jim Rountree, American CFL football player (d. 2013)
- April 26 – Doug Sax, American mastering engineer (d. 2015)
- April 28 – Charles Hill, American diplomat and academic (d. 2021)
- April 29 – Lane Smith, American actor (d. 2005)
- April 30 – Bobby Gregg, American musician (d. 2014)

=== May ===
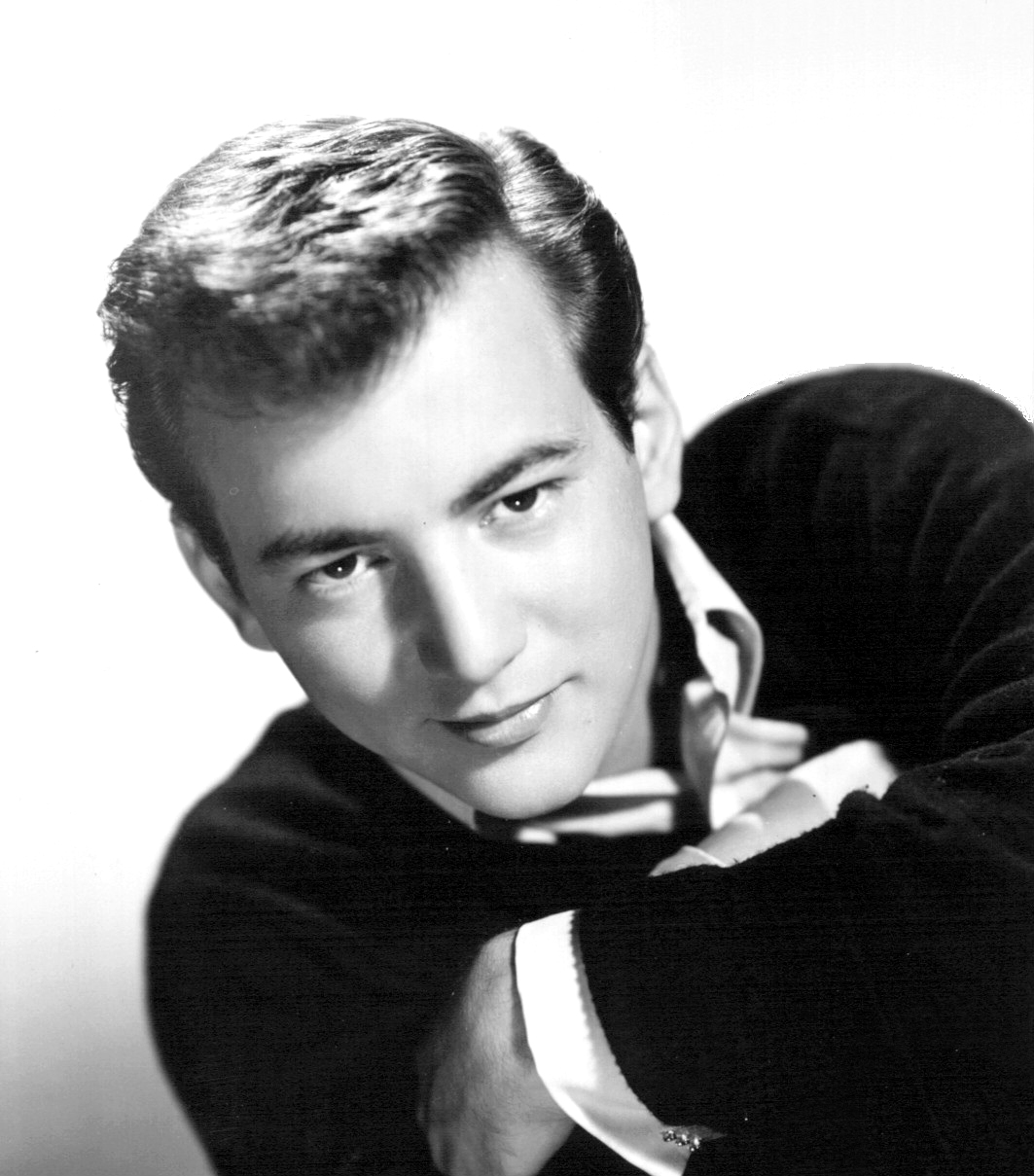
Bobby Darin

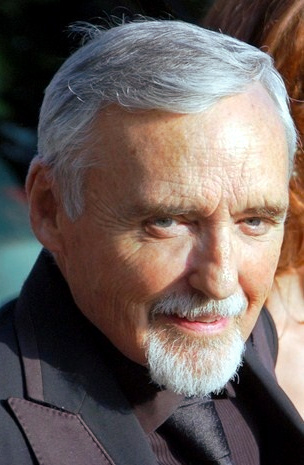
Dennis Hopper

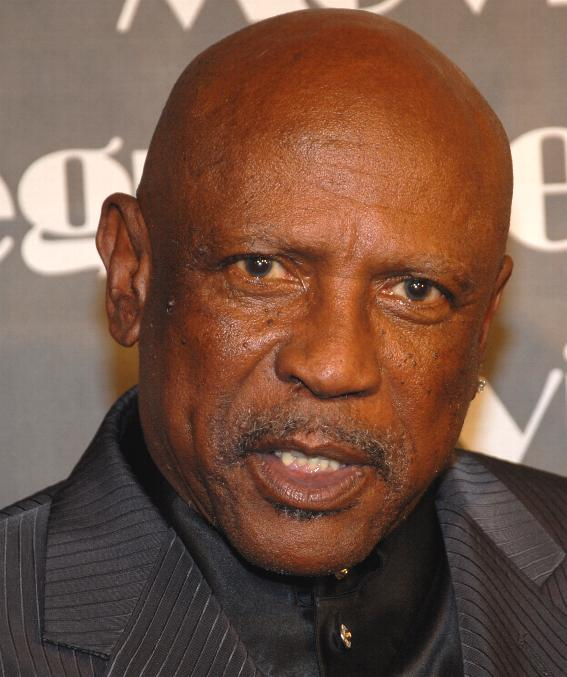
Louis Gossett Jr.

- May 1 – Jerry Mander, American author and activist (d. 2023)
- May 2
  - Sam DeLuca, American football offensive lineman, sports broadcaster (d. 2011)
  - Perdita Huston, American journalist (d. 2001)
- May 4 – Eleanor Coppola, American documentary filmmaker, artist and writer (d. 2024)
- May 7 – Jimmy Ruffin, African-American singer (d. 2014)
- May 8 – Clyde Bellecourt, Native American rights organiser (d. 2022)
- May 9
  - Terry Drinkwater, American television and radio journalist (d. 1989)
  - Floyd Robinson, African-American baseball player
- May 11 – Carla Bley, American jazz musician (d. 2023)
- May 12
  - Tom Snyder, American talk show host (d. 2007)
  - Frank Stella, American minimalist painter (d. 2024)
- May 14
  - Bobby Darin, American singer and actor (d. 1973)
  - Dick Howser, American baseball shortstop, manager (d. 1987)
- May 15
  - Wavy Gravy, American anti-war activist
  - Paul Zindel, American playwright and YA novelist (d. 2003)
- May 16 – Philippe de Montebello, American museum director
- May 17 – Dennis Hopper, American actor and director (d. 2010)
- May 22
  - George H. Heilmeier, American engineer (d. 2014)
  - M. Scott Peck, American psychiatrist (d. 2005)
- May 23 – Charles Kimbrough, American actor (d. 2023)
- May 24 – Harold Budd, American avant-garde composer and poet (d. 2020)
- May 25 – Tom T. Hall, American country singer-songwriter (d. 2021)
- May 27 – Louis Gossett Jr., African-American actor (d. 2024)
- May 29 – Arlene McQuade, American actress (d. 2014)

=== June ===
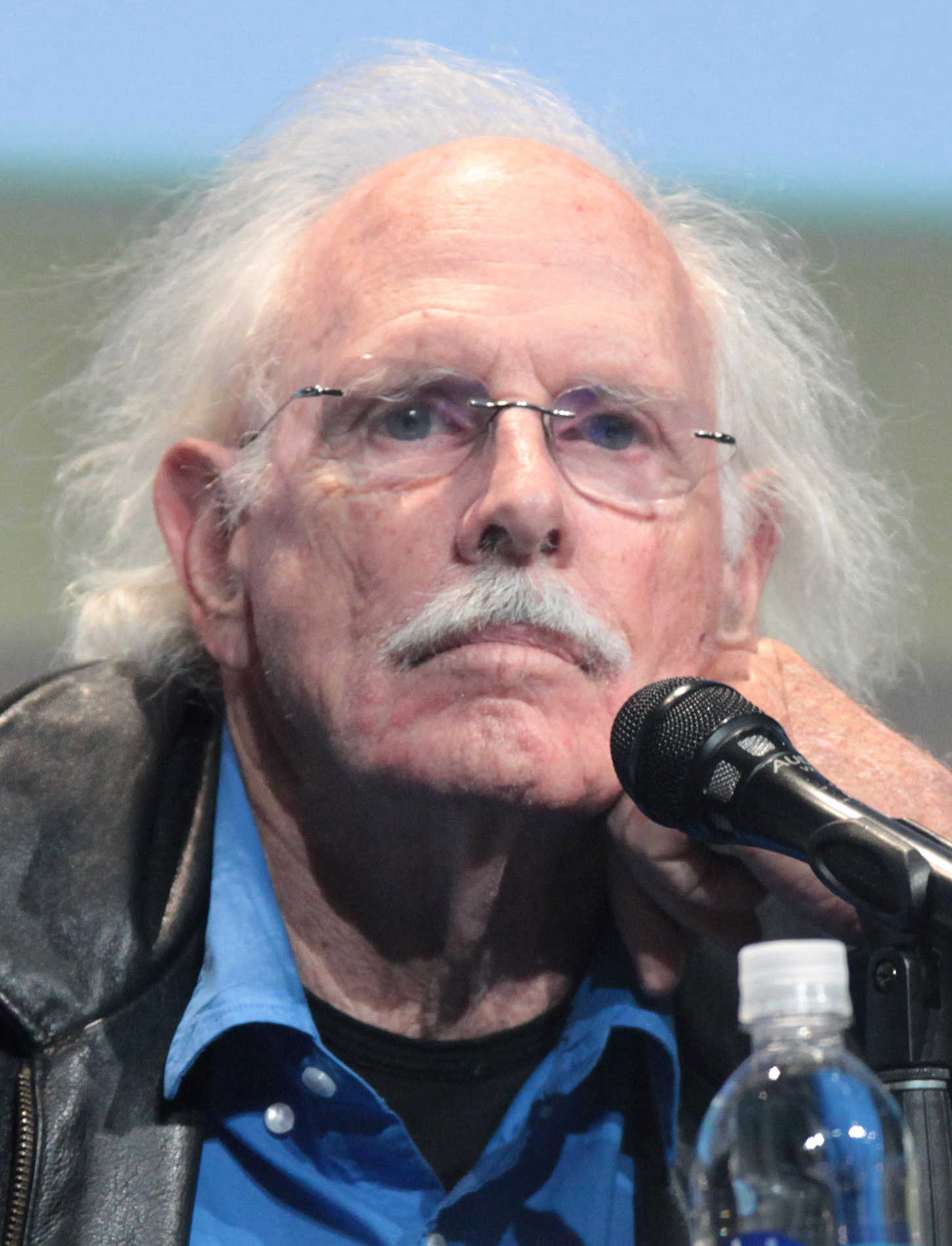
Bruce Dern

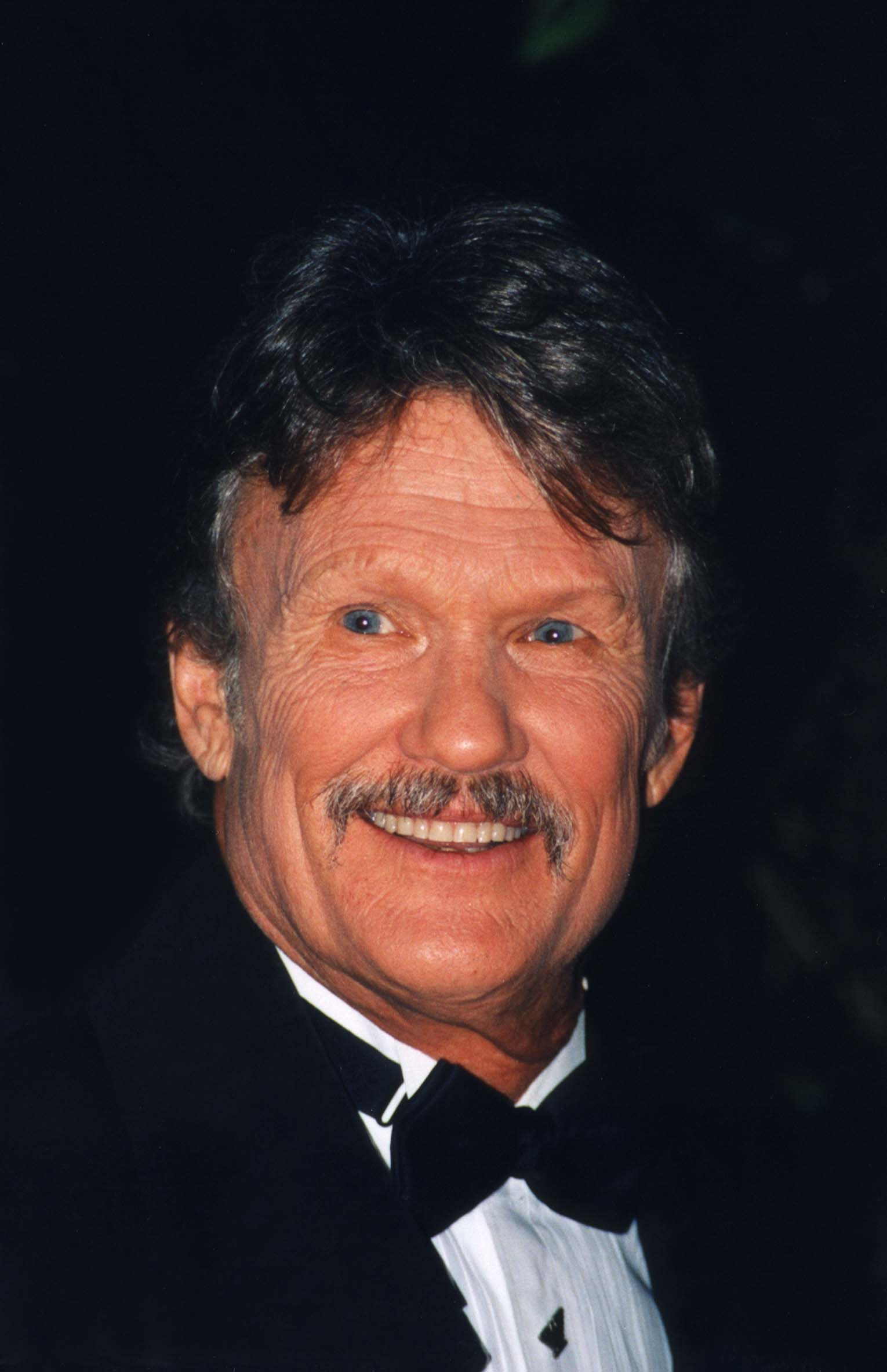
Kris Kristofferson

- June 3 – Larry McMurtry, American novelist, essayist, bookseller and screenwriter (d. 2021)
- June 4 – Bruce Dern, American screen actor
- June 6
  - Richard Green, American sexologist, psychiatrist, lawyer and author (d. 2019)
  - Levi Stubbs, American baritone singer (d. 2008)
- June 8
  - James Darren, American actor, singer (d. 2024)
  - Kenneth G. Wilson, American theoretical physicist (d. 2013)
- June 11 – Jud Strunk, American singer and comedian (d. 1981)
- June 12 – Marcus Belgrave, American jazz trumpeter (d. 2015)
- June 14 – Renaldo Benson, American R&B singer-songwriter (d. 2005)
- June 15 – William Levada, American cardinal (d. 2019)
- June 19 – Shirley Goodman, American R&B singer (d. 2005)
- June 20 – Billy Guy, American singer (d. 2002)
- June 22 – Kris Kristofferson, American actor and country singer-songwriter (d. 2024)
- June 24 – Robert Downey Sr., American film actor and director (d. 2021)
- June 26 – Hal Greer, African-American professional basketball player (d. 2018)
- June 27 – Lucille Clifton, American poet, writer and educator (d. 2010)
- June 28
  - Chuck Howley, American football player
  - Major Owens, African-American politician (d. 2013)
- June 29 – Harmon Killebrew, American baseball player (d. 2011)
- June 30 – Nancy Dussault, American actress and singer

=== July ===
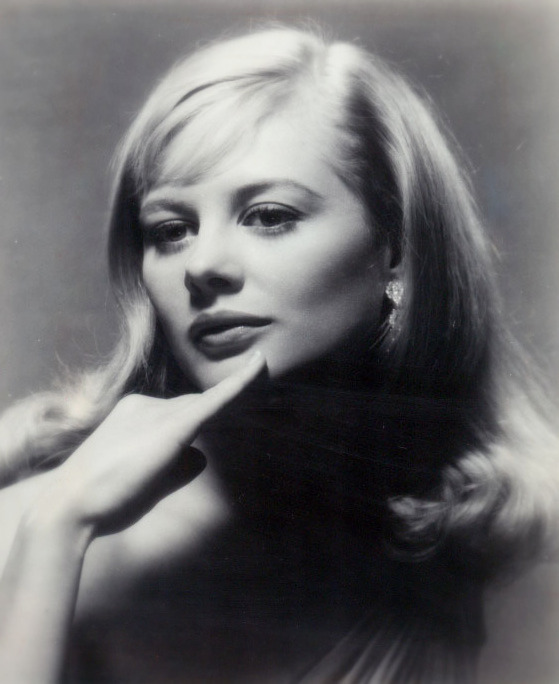
Shirley Knight

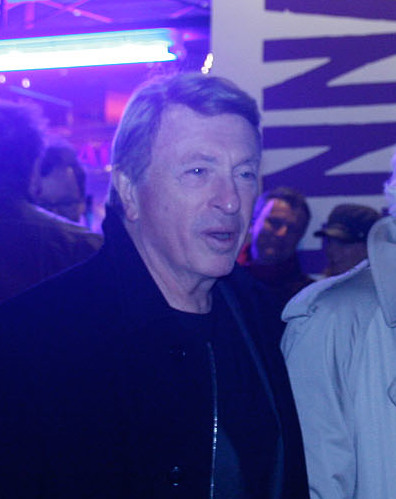
Larry Cohen

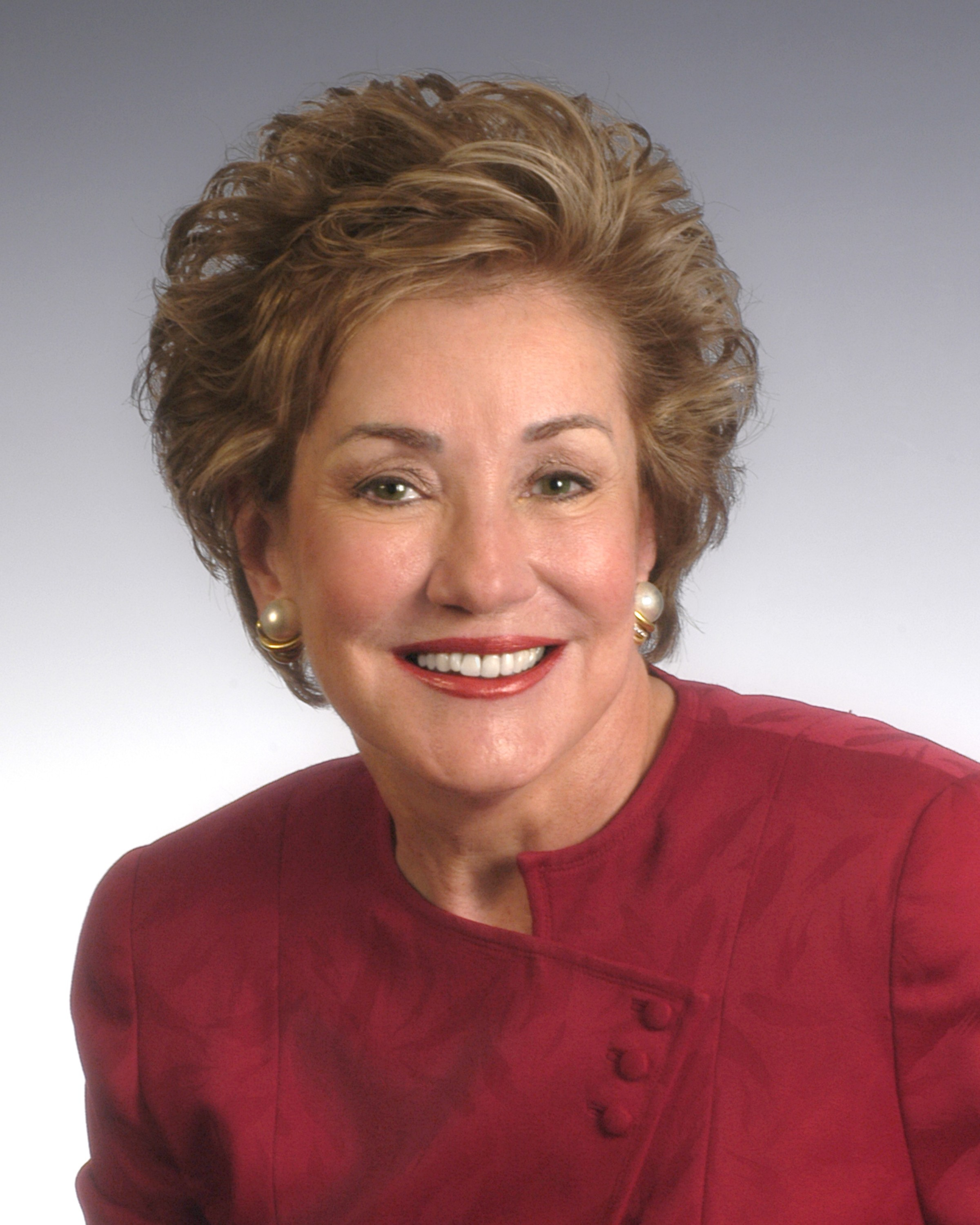
Elizabeth Dole

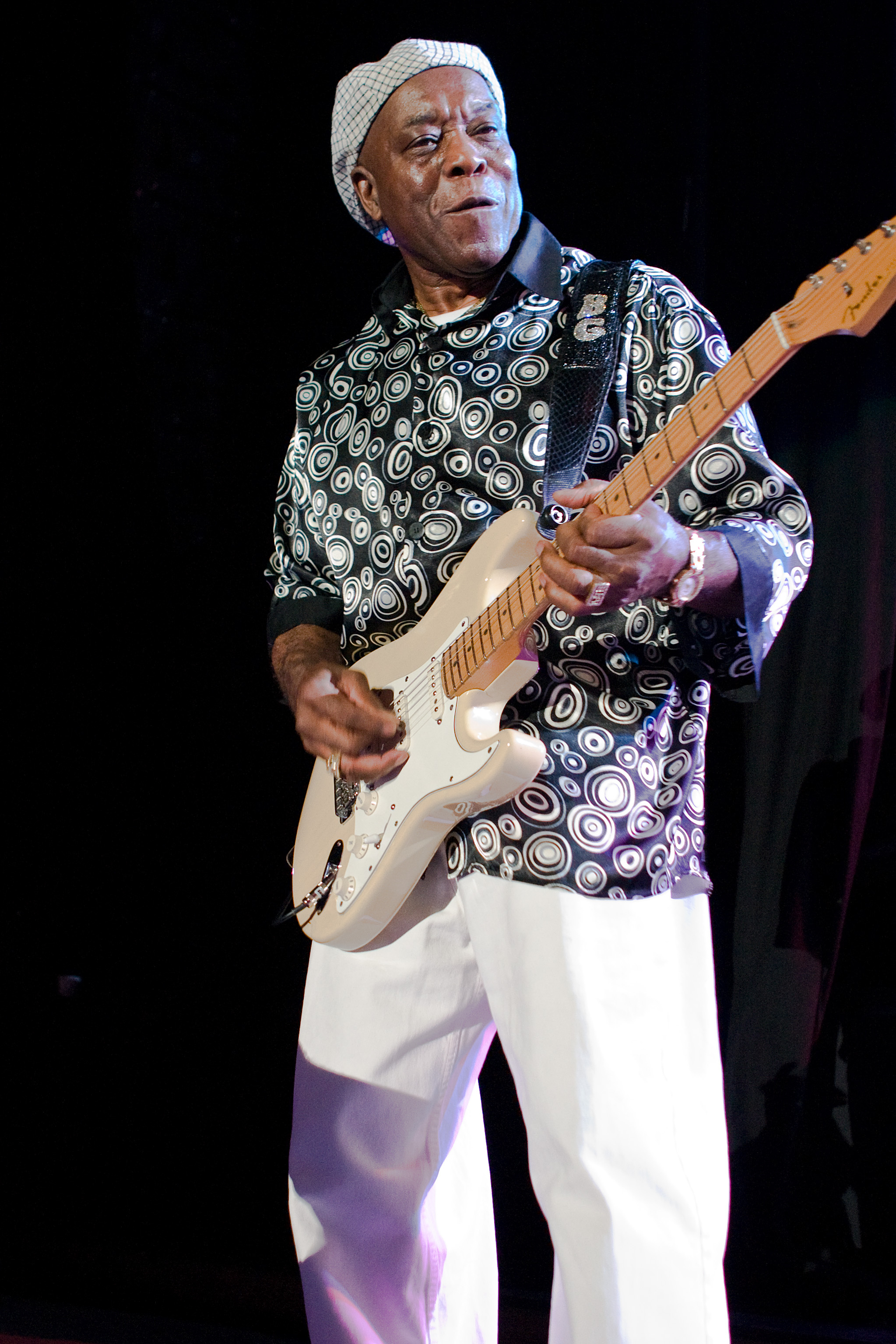
Buddy Guy

- July 1
  - Wally Amos, African-American businessman and television personality (d. 2024)
  - Ron Masak, American actor (d. 2022)
  - Syl Johnson, African-American blues musician (d. 2022)
- July 4 – Dick Hyde, American trombonist (d. 2019)
- July 5 – Shirley Knight, American actress (d. 2020)
- July 7 – Joseph Renzulli, American educational psychologist
- July 9
  - James Hampton, American actor (d. 2021)
  - June Jordan, Jamaican American poet, essayist, teacher and activist (d. 2002)
  - David Zinman, American conductor and violinist
- July 10
  - Herbert Boyer, American biotechnology entrepreneur
  - Barbara B. Kennelly, American politician
- July 11 – Joe Bussard, American record collector (d. 2022)
- July 12 – Frank Ryan, American football player and mathematician (d. 2024)
- July 13 – Albert Ayler, African-American saxophonist, singer and composer (d. 1970)
- July 14
  - Pema Chödrön, American Tibetan Buddhist
  - Robert F. Overmyer, American astronaut (d. 1996)
- July 15
  - Larry Cohen, American film director, producer and screenwriter (d. 2019)
  - George Voinovich, American politician (d. 2016)
- July 16 – Buddy Merrill, American musician (d. 2021)
- July 18 – Jerry Richardson, American businessman and football club owner (d. 2023)
- July 19 – Connie Kurtz, American LGBT rights activist (d. 2018)
- July 20
  - Butch Baird, American professional golfer
  - Barbara Mikulski, American politician
- July 23
  - Don Drysdale, American baseball player (d. 1993)
  - Anthony Kennedy, Associate Justice of the Supreme Court of the U.S. from 1988 to 2018
- July 24
  - Ruth Buzzi, American actress, comedian and singer (d. 2025)
  - Mark Goddard, American actor (d. 2023)
- July 27 – J. Robert Hooper, American politician (d. 2008)
- July 29
  - Lionel Dahmer, American analytical chemist and author (d. 2023)
  - Elizabeth Dole, American politician
- July 30 – Buddy Guy, African-American blues singer and guitarist

=== August ===
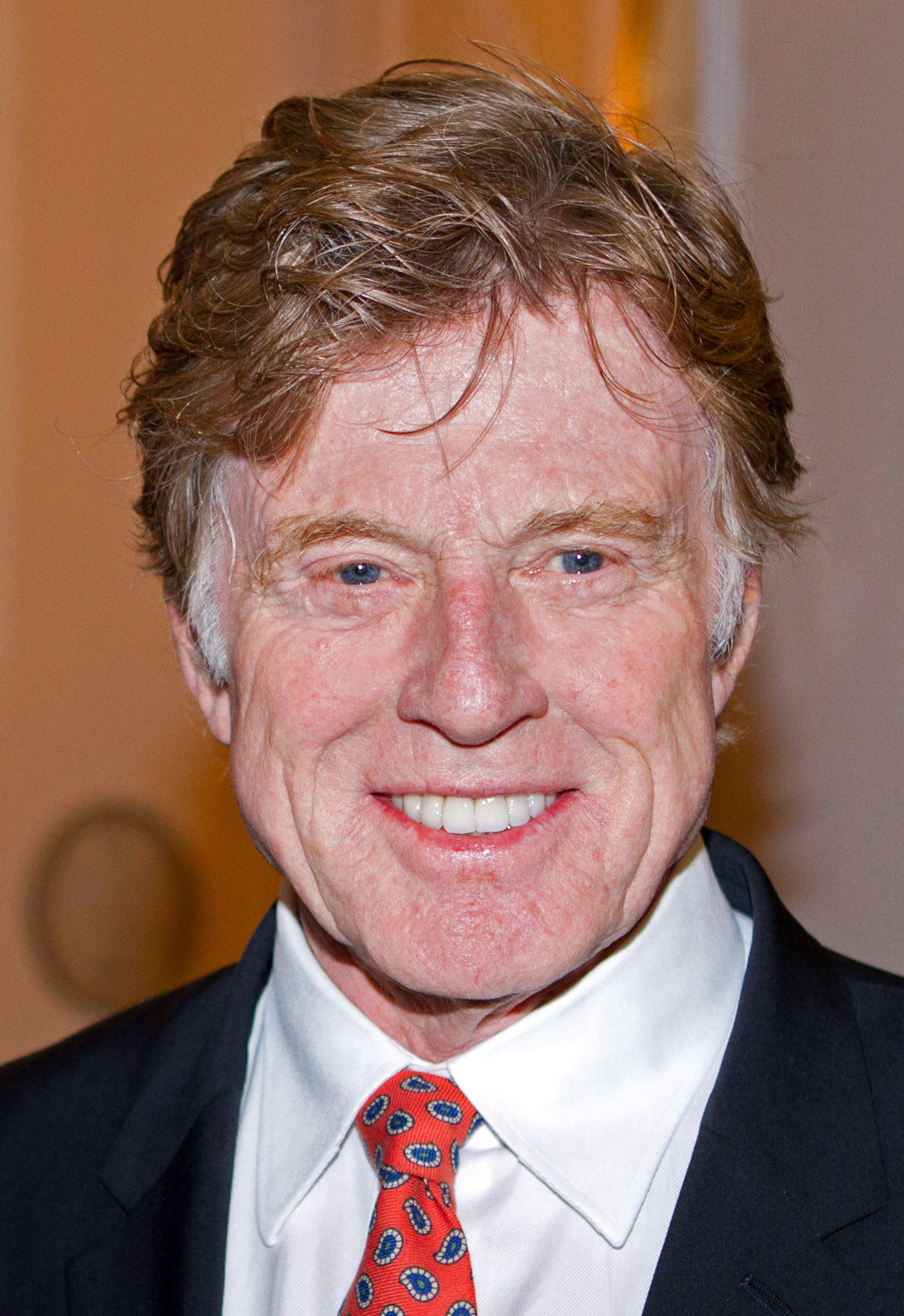
Robert Redford

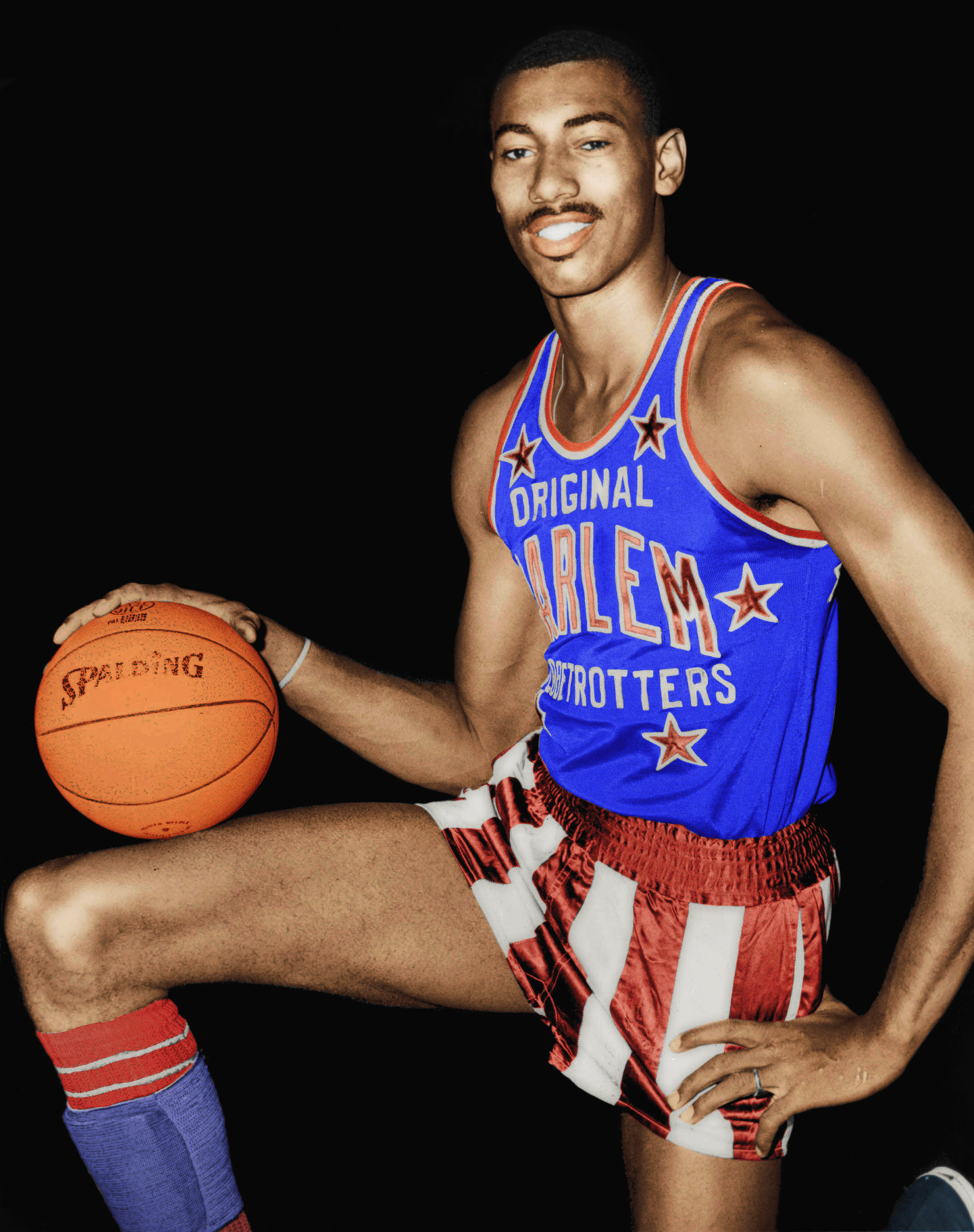
Wilt Chamberlain

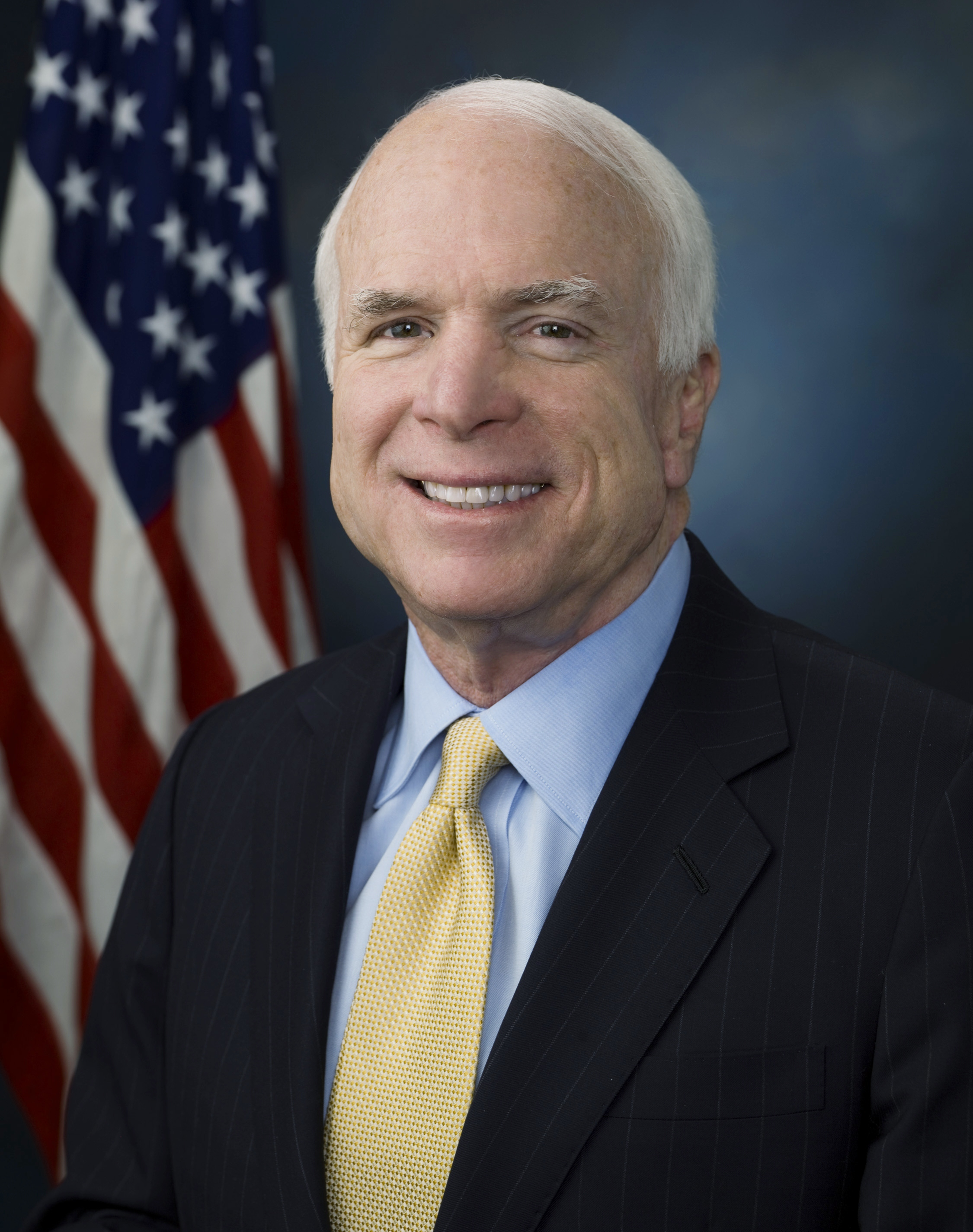
John McCain

- August 1 – Bradford Bishop, American fugitive
- August 5 – John Saxon, American actor (d. 2020)
- August 7 – Richard L. Tierney, American poet, novelist (d. 2022)
- August 8
  - Don Bowden, American middle-distance runner
  - Frank Howard, American baseball player (d. 2023)
- August 11 – Bill Monbouquette, American baseball player (d. 2015)
- August 12 – John Poindexter, American Naval officer, US Chief of Staff
- August 16
  - Anita Gillette, American actress
  - Bill Ratliff, American politician (d. 2025)
- August 17
  - Margaret Hamilton, American computer scientist and systems engineer (d. 2026)
  - Mark Mobius, American-born German fund manager (d .2026)
  - Floyd Westerman, Native American actor, artist, musician and political activist (d. 2007)
- August 18 – Robert Redford, American actor, film director, producer, businessman, environmentalist, philanthropist (d. 2025)
- August 20 – Sam Melville, American actor (d. 1989)
- August 21 – Wilt Chamberlain, African-American basketball player (d. 1999)
- August 22
  - Dale Hawkins, American singer-songwriter (d. 2010)
  - Lex Humphries, American drummer (d. 1994)
- August 23
  - Rudy Lewis, American R&B singer (d. 1964)
  - Henry Lee Lucas, American serial killer (d. 2001)
- August 24
  - William J. Coyne, American politician (d. 2013)
  - Kenny Guinn, American politician (d. 2010)
- August 26 – Benedict Anderson, American political scientist and historian (d. 2015)
- August 27 – Joel Kovel, American scholar and author (d. 2018)
- August 28 – Don Denkinger, American professional baseball player (d. 2023)
- August 29 – John McCain, American politician, U.S. senator (R-Az.) (d. 2018)
- August 31 – Richard J. Ferris, American business executive (d. 2022)

=== September ===
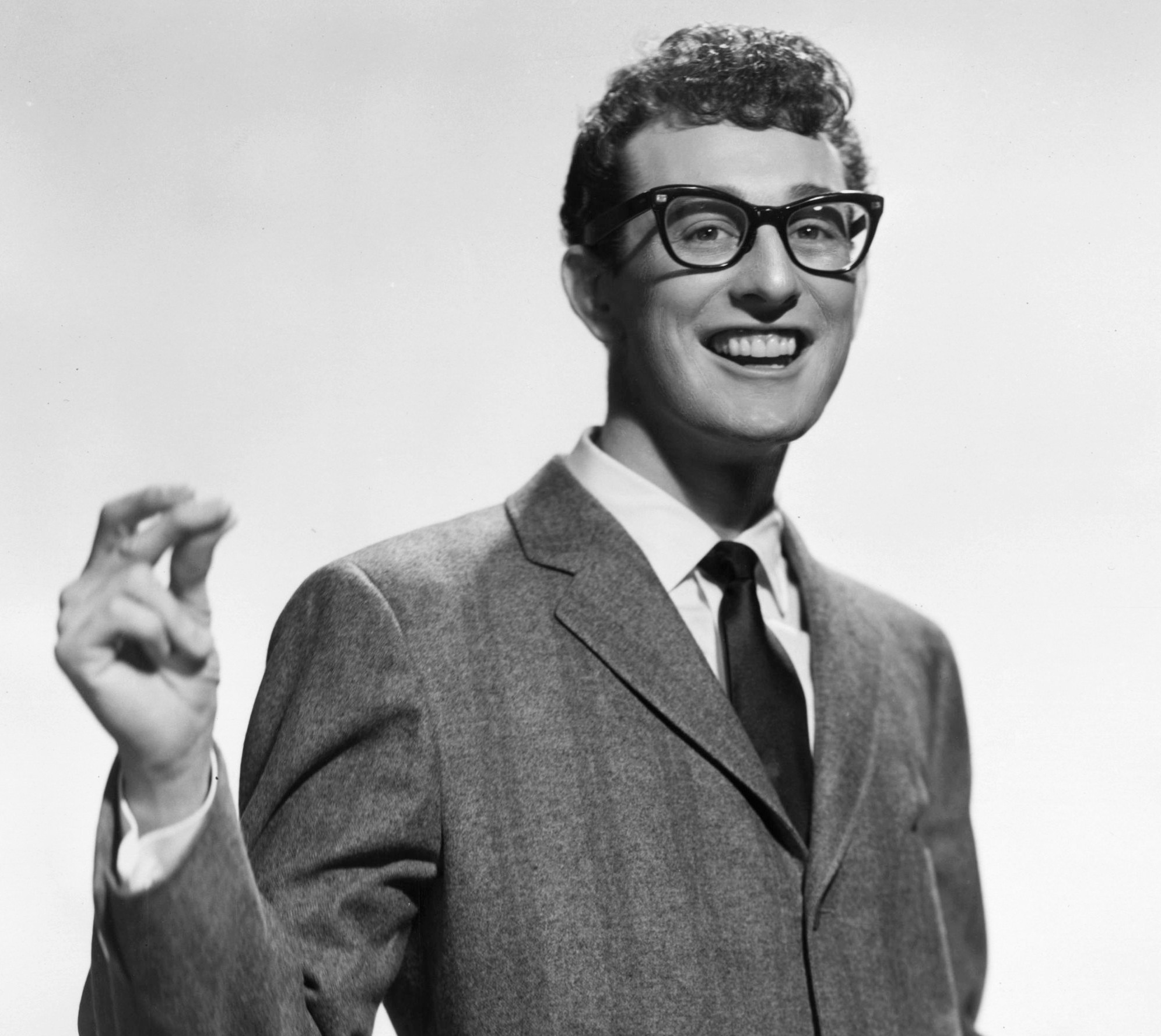
Buddy Holly

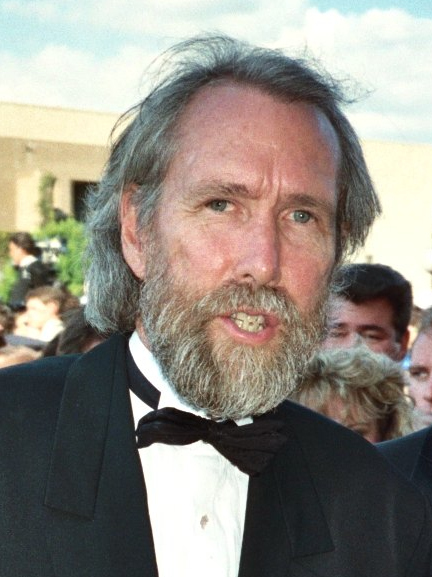
Jim Henson

- September 2 – Joan Bennett Kennedy, American socialite (d. 2025)
- September 3 – John Olver, American politician (d. 2023)
- September 5
  - John Danforth, American politician
  - Alcee Hastings, African-American politician (d. 2021)
  - Jonathan Kozol, American writer, educator and activist
  - Bill Mazeroski, American professional baseball player
- September 7 – Buddy Holly, American singer-songwriter and a pioneer of rock and roll (d. 1959)
- September 9 – Bob Harlan, American football executive (d. 2026)
- September 11 – Charles Dierkop, American actor (d. 2024)
- September 14
  - Walter Koenig, American actor (d. 2026)
  - Ferid Murad, Albanian-American physician and pharmacologist (d. 2023)
  - Stan Williams, American professional baseball player (died 2021)
- September 17 – Gerald Guralnik, American physicist (d. 2014)
- September 19 – Al Oerter, American Olympic athlete (d. 2007)
- September 21 – Dickey Lee, American singer-songwriter
- September 22 – Art Metrano, American actor and comedian (d. 2021)
- September 24 – Jim Henson, American puppeteer, filmmaker and television producer (The Muppets) (d. 1990)
- September 25 – Ken Forsse, American inventor, producer and creator of Teddy Ruxpin (d. 2014)
- September 27 – Don Cornelius, African-American television personality and host of Soul Train (d. 2012)
- September 30 – Jim Sasser, American politician (d. 2024)

=== October ===
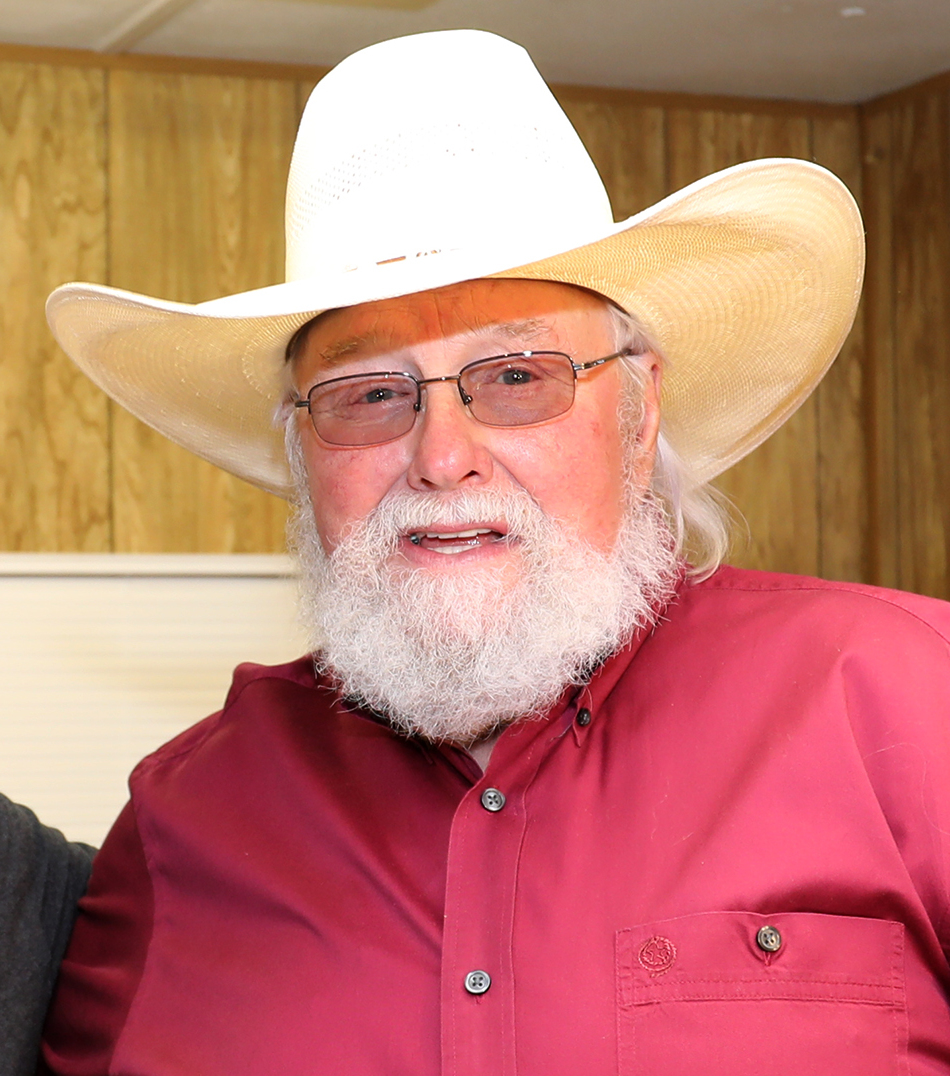
Charlie Daniels

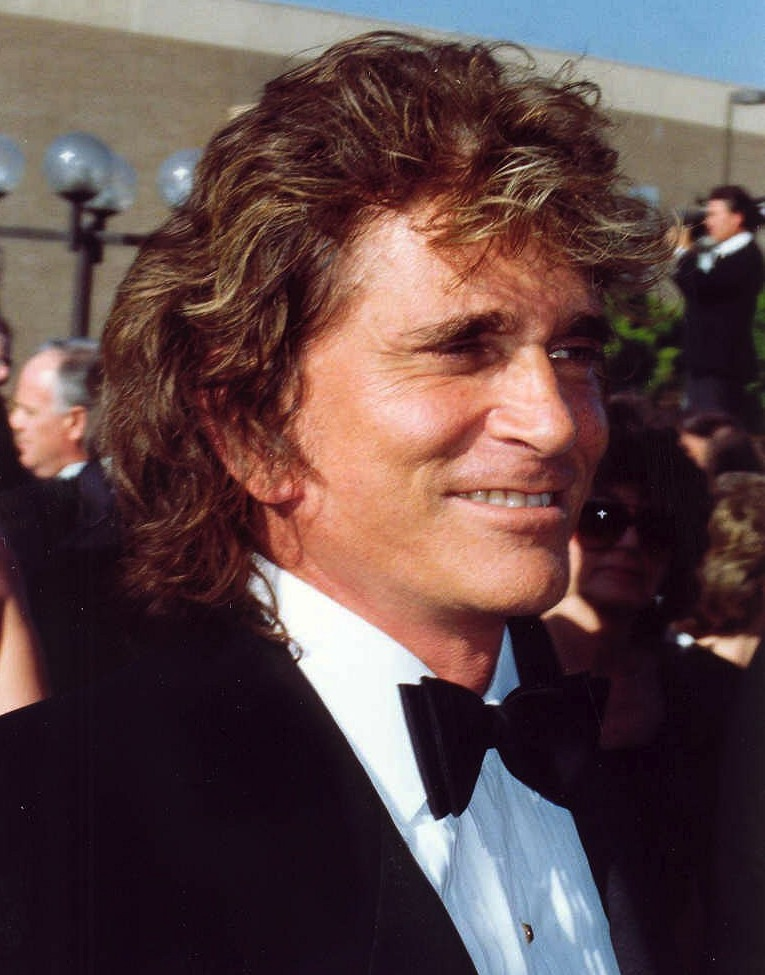
Michael Landon

- October 1 – Edward Villella, American danseur and choreographer
- October 3 – Steve Reich, American composer
- October 7 – Frank Otto, American educator (d. 2017)
- October 8 – Joe M. Haynes, American politician (d. 2018)
- October 11
  - C. Gordon Fullerton, American astronaut (d. 2013)
  - Larry Staverman, American professional basketball player, coach (d. 2007)
- October 13 – Cliff Gorman, American actor (d. 2002)
- October 14 – Carrie Nye, American actress (d. 2006)
- October 17 – Dave Hobson, American politician (d. 2024)
- October 19
  - James Bevel, African-American civil rights activist (d. 2008)
  - Tony Lo Bianco, American actor (d. 2024)
  - James P. Liautaud, American industrialist, inventor and business theorist (d. 2015)
- October 20 – Joanna Simon, American mezzo-soprano and journalist (d. 2022)
- October 22 – Bobby Seale, African-American political activist
- October 24 – David Nelson, American actor, director and producer (d. 2011)
- October 26 – Shelley Morrison, American actress (d. 2019)
- October 28
  - Charlie Daniels, American country musician and singer-songwriter (d. 2020)
  - Carl Davis, American-born British composer (d. 2023)
- October 30 – Merri Dee, American television journalist and philanthropist (d. 2022)
- October 31 – Michael Landon, American actor, director, producer and writer (d. 1991)

=== November ===
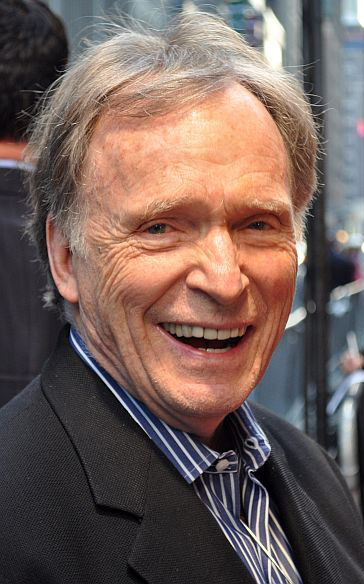
Dick Cavett

- November 2 – Rose Bird, American judge (d. 1999)
- November 3 – Clifford Curry, American singer (d. 2016)
- November 4 – C. K. Williams, American poet (d. 2015)
- November 5 – Billy Sherrill, American record producer, arranger and songwriter (d. 2015)
- November 7 – Al Attles, African-American basketball player and coach (d. 2024)
- November 9
  - Bob Graham, American politician (d. 2024)
  - Teddy Infuhr, American child actor (d. 2007)
- November 11 – Susan Kohner, American actress
- November 14
  - Cornell Gunter, American singer (The Coasters and The Flairs) (d. 1990)
  - Bob Walkup, American politician, Mayor of Tucson (d. 2021)
- November 19 – Dick Cavett, American talk show host, television personality
- November 20 – Don DeLillo, American author
- November 23 – Steve Landesberg, American actor, director (d. 2010)
- November 24 – Frank Caprio, American judge (d. 2025)
- November 27 – Glynn Lunney, American aerospace engineer (d. 2021)
- November 28 – Gary Hart, American politician, diplomat and lawyer

=== December ===
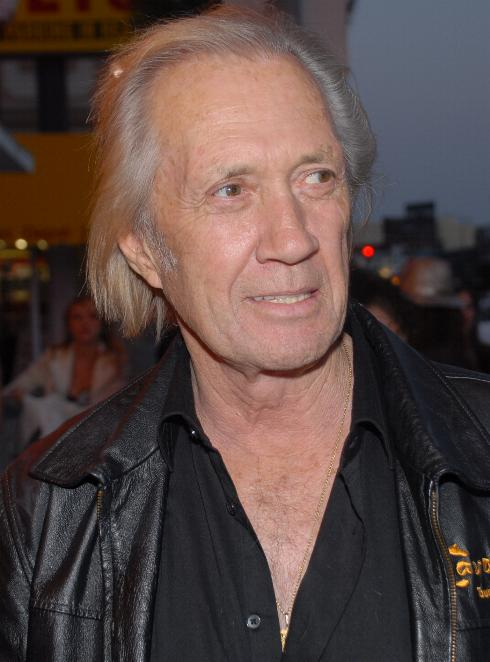
David Carradine

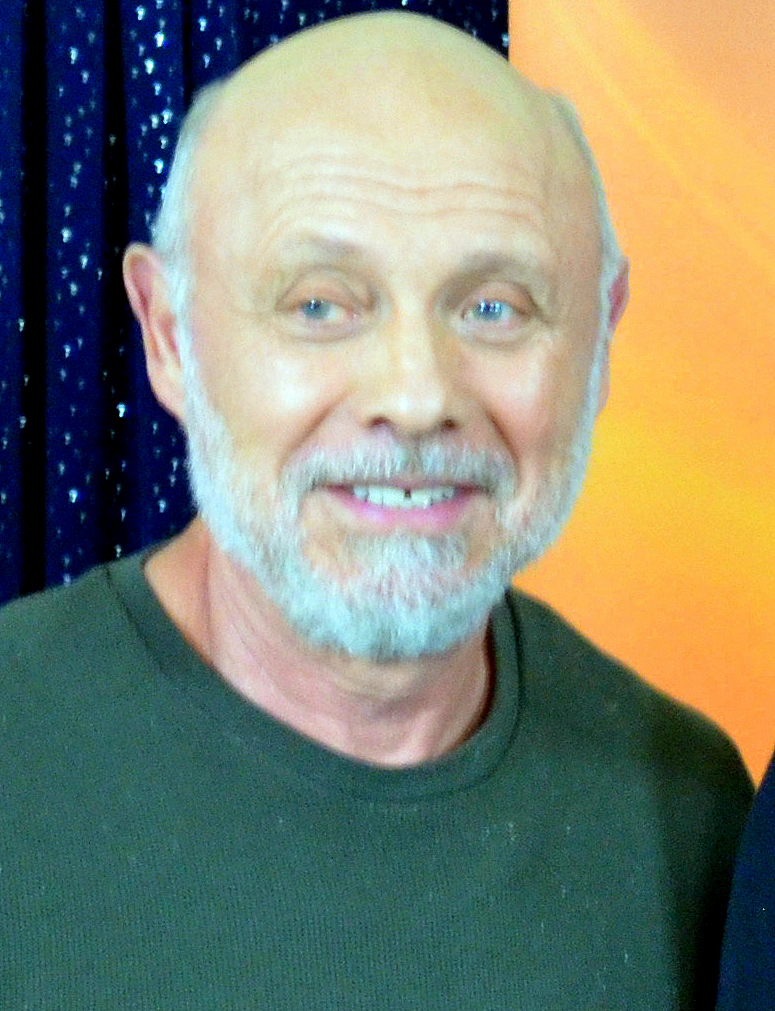
Héctor Elizondo

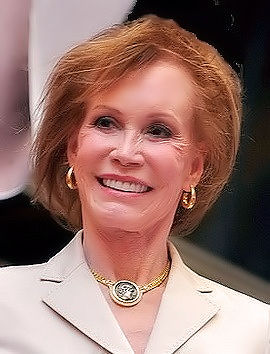
Mary Tyler Moore

- December 1 – Joel Breman, American epidemiologist (d. 2024)
- December 2 – James C. Scott, American political scientist and anthropologist (d. 2024)
- December 3
  - Mary Alice, American actress (d. 2022)
  - Clay Dalrymple, American baseball player
- December 4
  - Freddy Cannon, American singer (d. 2026)
  - Larry Davis, African-American blues musician (d. 1994)
- December 5
  - James Lee Burke, American novelist
  - John Erwin, American actor (d. 2024)
- December 6
  - Kenneth Copeland, American televangelist
  - David Ossman, American writer and comedian
- December 7 – Martha Layne Collins, American businesswoman and politician, governor of Kentucky (d. 2025)
- December 8 – David Carradine, American actor, director and martial artist (d. 2009)
- December 11 – Tom Fuccello, American actor (d. 1993)
- December 12
  - Wally Dallenbach Sr., American racing driver and official (d. 2024)
  - Reggie Young, American musician (d. 2019)
- December 13 – J. C. Martin, American professional baseball player
- December 14
  - Robert A. Parker, American physicist and astronomer
  - Frank Williams, American architect (d. 2010)
- December 15 – Donald Goines, African-American novelist (d. 1974)
- December 17 – Rollie Sheldon, American professional baseball player
- December 20 – Judy Henske, American singer-songwriter (d. 2022)
- December 21 – Barbara Roberts, American politician
- December 22
  - Héctor Elizondo, American actor
  - Fred Malek, American business executive, political advisor and philanthropist (d. 2019)
- December 23
  - Frederic Forrest, American actor (d. 2023)
  - Bobby Ross, American football player and coach
  - James Stacy, American actor (d. 2016)
- December 24 – Dirck Halstead, American photojournalist (d. 2022)
- December 26 – Kitty Dukakis, American author and First Lady of Massachusetts (d. 2025)
- December 28
  - Jim McDermott, American politician (d. 2026)
  - Lawrence Schiller, American journalist, film producer, director and screenwriter
- December 29
  - Mary Tyler Moore, American actress, producer and diabetes awareness activist (d. 2017)
  - Ray Nitschke, American professional football player (d. 1998)

== Deaths ==
- January 1 – Harry B. Smith, songwriter, librettist and composer (born 1860)
- January 6 – Louise Bryant, journalist (born 1885)
- January 9 – John Gilbert, silent film actor (born 1897)
- January 15 – George Landenberger, U.S. Navy captain and 23rd governor of American Samoa (born 1879)
- January 16 – Albert Fish, serial killer (executed; born 1870)
- February 3 – Elia Goode Byington, newspaper proprietor, editor and manager (born 1858)
- February 8 – Charles Curtis, 31st vice president of the United States from 1929 to 1933 (born 1860)
- February 9 – John Cutting Berry, physician and missionary (born 1847)
- February 19 – Billy Mitchell, U.S. general and military aviation pioneer (born 1879)
- March 4 – Charles F. Watkins, physician (born 1872)
- March 6 – Rubin Goldmark, pianist, composer and teacher (born 1872)
- March 11 – Ferdinand Lee Barnett, African American journalist, lawyer and civil rights activist (born 1852)
- March 18 – W. Herbert Dunton, Western painter (born 1878)
- April 3 – Richard Hauptmann, carpenter convicted of murder (born 1899 in Germany; executed)
- April 13 – Howard Thurston, stage magician (born 1869)
- April 22 – Mary Haviland Stilwell Kuesel, pioneer dentist (born 1866)
- May 20 – Elmer Fowler Stone, first United States Coast Guard aviator (born 1887)
- May 29 – Norman Chaney, actor (born 1914)
- June 11 – Robert E. Howard, pulp fiction and fantasy writer and poet (suicide; born 1906)
- June 27 – Mike Bernard, ragtime musician (born 1881)
- July 8 – Thomas Meighan, actor (b. 1879)
- July 21 – Earle Ovington, aviator, flew first experimental airmail (born 1879)
- August 8 – Mourning Dove, Native American writer (born 1884)
- September 14 – Irving Thalberg, film producer, pneumonia, (born 1899)
- September 26 – Harriet Monroe, literary editor, scholar and critic and patron of the arts (born 1860)
- October 3 – John Heisman, American football coach (born 1869)
- October 8
  - Cheiro, astrologer (born 1866 in Ireland)
  - William Henry Stark, businessman (born 1851)
- October 13 – John H. Hill, African American lawyer and educator (born 1852)
- October 20 – Anne Sullivan, teacher of Helen Keller (born 1866)
- November 2 – Nathaniel P. Conrey, politician and Associate Justice of the Supreme Court of California (born 1860)
- November 6 – Henry Bourne Joy, business leader (born 1864)
- November 22 – Oris Paxton Van Sweringen, financier (born 1879)
- December 8 – Katherine Metzel Debs, wife of American Socialist Eugene V. Debs (born 1867)
- December 11 – Myron Grimshaw, baseball player (born 1875)
- December 24 – Irene Fenwick, stage and silent film actress (anorexia; born 1887)

== See also ==
- List of American films of 1936
- Timeline of United States history (1930–1949)
