= Lawrence Warehouse Company =

Lawrence Warehouse Company was a business based in San Francisco, California, USA, which had an initial public offering in May 1936. The firm registered 20,001 shares of convertible preferred stock with the Securities Exchange Commission which was valued at $200,010.

== Acquisitions of business ==
The corporation acquired Tidewater Field Warehouses, Inc., of New York City in April 1950 and Terminal Warehouse of Baltimore, Maryland, in June 1950. The takeover included approximately 125 active field warehouse accounts. 75 of the businesses were made up of companies involved in canning, frozen food packing and like food processing.

== Litigation against firm ==
A $9 million claim was brought against the Lawrence Warehouse Company following its May 16, 1963, acquisition of the warehousing facilities of a subsidiary of American Express Company, American Express Field Warehousing Corporation. Although the American Express subsidiary was absorbed by the Lawrence Warehouse Company, salad oil storage facilities in Bayonne, New Jersey, were exempted from the agreement. Ironically the claim brought against a unit of the Lawrence Warehouse Company was founded on a $150 million allegation of non-existent oil, purportedly stored in tanks in Bayonne.
