= Joel Breman =

American epidemiologist (1936–2024)

- in Yambuku, Zaïre in 1976
- Born: December 1, 1936; Chicago, Illinois, U.S.
- Died: April 6, 2024 (aged 87); Chevy Chase, Maryland, U.S.
- Education: University of California, Los Angeles (BS); University of Southern California (MD); London School of Hygiene and Tropical Medicine
- Spouse: Vicki Breman
- Children: 2
- Scientific career
- Fields: Epidemiology
- Workplaces: CDC; WHO

Joel Breman (December 1, 1936 – April 6, 2024) was an American epidemiologist who worked for the US Centers for Disease Control (CDC), the World Health Organization (WHO) and became president of the American Society of Tropical Medicine and Hygiene. He led efforts to control botulism, ebola, malaria, smallpox and emerging infectious diseases.

== Early life and education ==
Joel Gordon Breman was born on December 1, 1936, in Chicago, but grew up in Los Angeles. He attended the University of California, Los Angeles, where he was a member of the varsity crew team. After graduating in the late 1950s, he became an artillery officer before going on to attend the University of Southern California (USC) School of Medicine, graduating in 1965. He completed a residency in internal medicine at Los Angeles County-USC Medical Center, followed by a fellowship in Infectious diseases at Boston City Hospital, the latter of which was supported by a Centers for Disease Control and Prevention (CDC) career development award. He later earned a diploma in public health from the London School of Hygiene and Tropical Medicine.

== Career ==
After graduating, Breman first worked for the CDC in Michigan, where he led the response to the country's, at the time, worst botulism outbreak. He was later moved to Guinea to support efforts on smallpox eradication. In early 1976, he returned to Michigan to settle with his family. However, in October, the CDC asked him to investigate a viral outbreak in Zaire. There, he was part of the team which discovered Ebola and responded to the first Ebola pandemic in the country. The outbreak was so severe that the pilots that dropped them off in the remote area of the epidemic did not expect to see them return alive. The team concluded that the disease was transmitted from close contact with infected body fluids and that a rural hospital that used unsterilized needles had propagated the disease. He was working for the World Health Organization (WHO) in Geneva in 1980, when smallpox was officially declared eradicated. At the WHO he also oversaw research on mpox.

In the 1980s, Breman returned to the CDC, where he was chief of the epidemiology and control activities in the Malaria Branch. While there, he oversaw research between the CDC and 15 countries in Africa regarding pregnancy-associated malaria, antimalarial medications, insecticide-treated mosquito nets.

In 1993, Breman became the associate director of the National Vaccine Program Office in Washington, D.C. In 1995, he joined the National Institutes of Health's Fogarty International Center, where he oversaw the formation of a research program investigating emerging infectious diseases. While in Washington, D.C., Breman taught classes at the Milken Institute School of Public Health.

By 2020, he was president of the American Society of Tropical Medicine and Hygiene, and led the organization through the first year of the COVID-19 pandemic.

Breman's first academic paper was published in 1969; his final paper was published in October 2023. As of 2018, Breman had published over 195 scientific articles and book chapters. He was also working on a textbook, The Principles and Practice of Disease Eradication, and a memoir in 2023.

== Personal life and death ==
Breman and his wife, Vicki, had two children. He was Jewish.

Joel Breman died from kidney cancer in Chevy Chase, Maryland, on April 6, 2024, at age 87. Per his wishes, he had a funeral which was "more celebratory than mournful". The procession of his body out of the synagogue featured musicians playing Amazing Grace on tuba, drum, trumpet, clarinet, and accordion.
