= Orgill (company) =

American independent hardware distributor

Orgill, Inc.
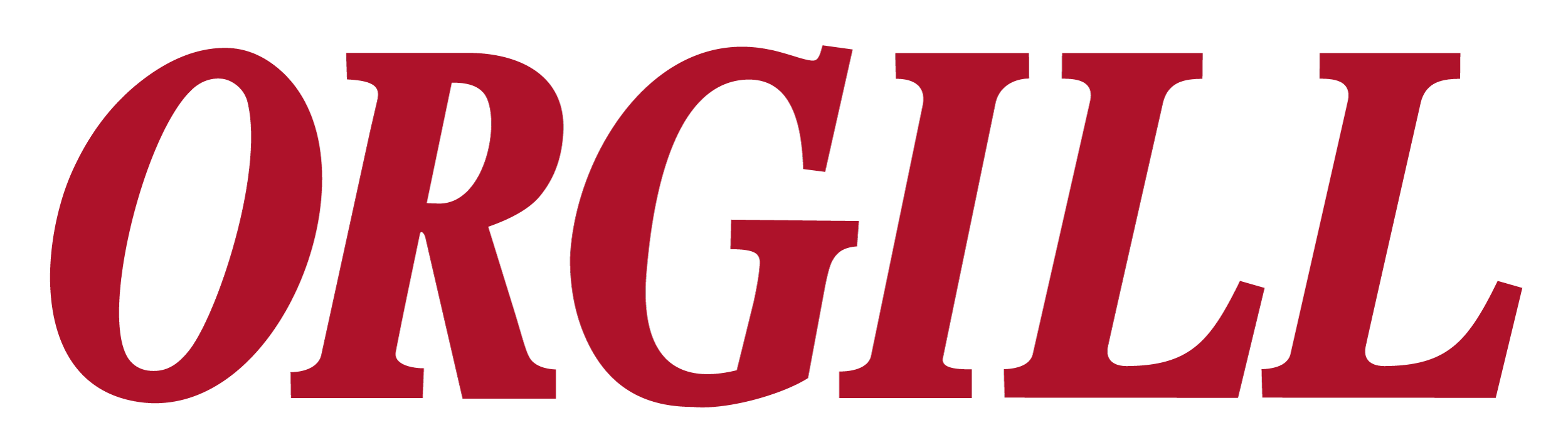
- Company type: Privately held company
- Industry: Hardware distribution
- Founded: 1847 in Memphis, Tennessee, U.S.
- Founder: William Orgill
- Headquarters: Collierville, Tennessee, U.S.
- Key people: Boyden Moore (president and CEO)
- Revenue: US$3.04 billion (2020)
- Number of employees: 4,868 (2020)
- Website: www.orgill.com

Orgill, Inc. is an American independent hardware distributor with headquarters in Collierville, Tennessee. It is the world's largest independently owned hardlines distributor. Founded in Memphis, Tennessee, in 1847, Orgill was Memphis's oldest operating private business, before it relocated to nearby Collierville in recent years. It was ranked in 143rd place on the Forbes list of America's largest private companies in 2021, with revenues of $2.6 billion in 2019, surpassing $3 billion in 2020.

== History ==
=== Early history ===
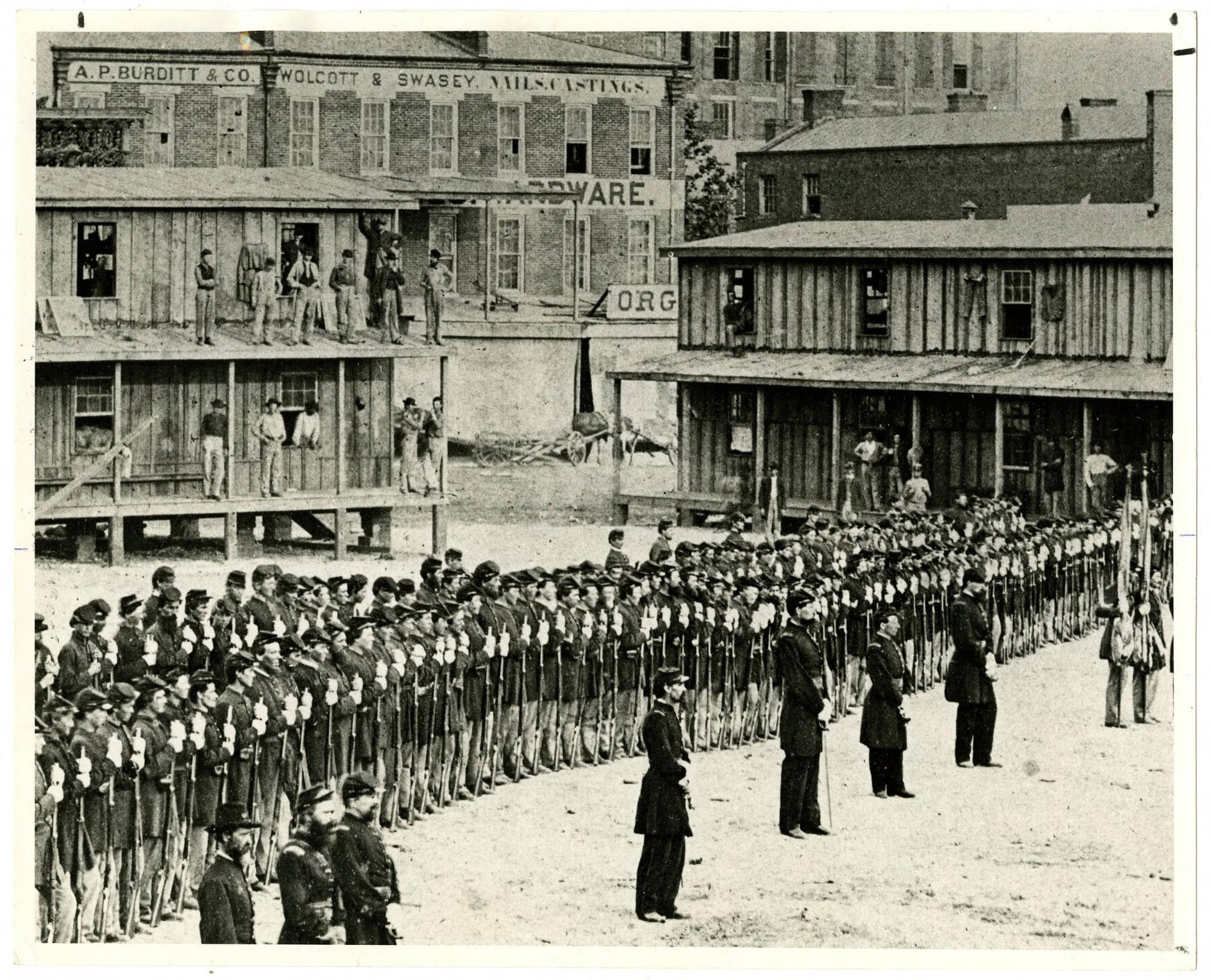
Orgill Brothers & Co. building during the Civil War.

William Orgill went to the United States from England to work for his brother Joseph's importing company in New York as a traveling salesman. In 1846, William and R. T. Lamb bought a retail hardware business in Petersburg, Virginia, and in 1847 they moved the hardware business from Virginia to Memphis, Tennessee. When Lamb died in 1849, his share of the business was purchased by Henry Lownes, and the business became known as Lownes & Co. by 1850. A third Orgill brother, Edmund, also moved to the United States in 1850 to help his brother run the Memphis business, and three of his sons would later hold executive roles at the company. In 1851, the company underwent another name change and became Holyoake, Lownes & Co.

=== Hardware distribution ===
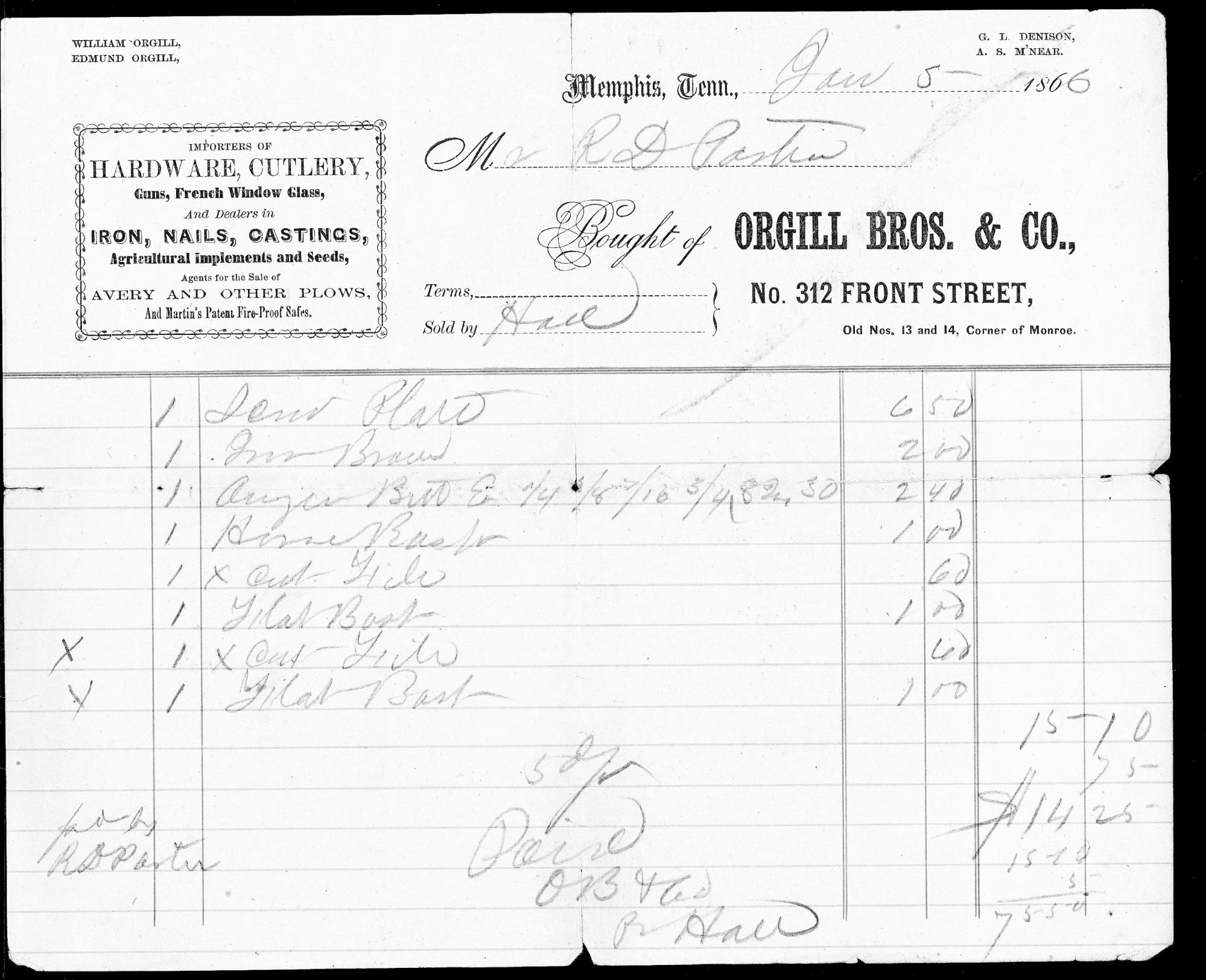
Orgill Brothers & Co. order form, circa 1866.

In 1908, the company, by then known as Orgill Brothers & Co., sold its retail business to DeSoto Hardware Co. in order to focus exclusively on distribution. Frederick and William Orgill both served as the company's president, and Joseph Sr. served as its vice president. William's son, Edmund succeeded him as president in 1940, and Edmund's cousin Joseph Jr. became president in 1955. In 1968, when Joseph Jr. retired, Joe Orgill III became president of Orgill Brothers & Co.

In the 1970s, Orgill Brothers & Co. began a campaign of expansion through acquisition of other businesses, including C.M. McClung, Teague Hardware, and Stratton-Warren. In 1981, Joe Orgill III asked Bill Fondren to take over as president of Orgill as part of a succession plan to shift the company into professional management. By the mid-1980s, Joseph Orgill III and his cousin and business partner Michael McDonnell bought out the other company shareholders and became the only Orgill family members still active at the Orgill Brothers & Co. business. During this time, Orgill Brothers & Co. became the fastest-growing independent distributor in the United States, and also began expanding internationally. A second distribution center was built in Tifton, Georgia, in 1996 to service the Southeast and operate as an export facility.

In 1996, the company officially changed its name to Orgill, Inc.

=== Expansion and international growth ===
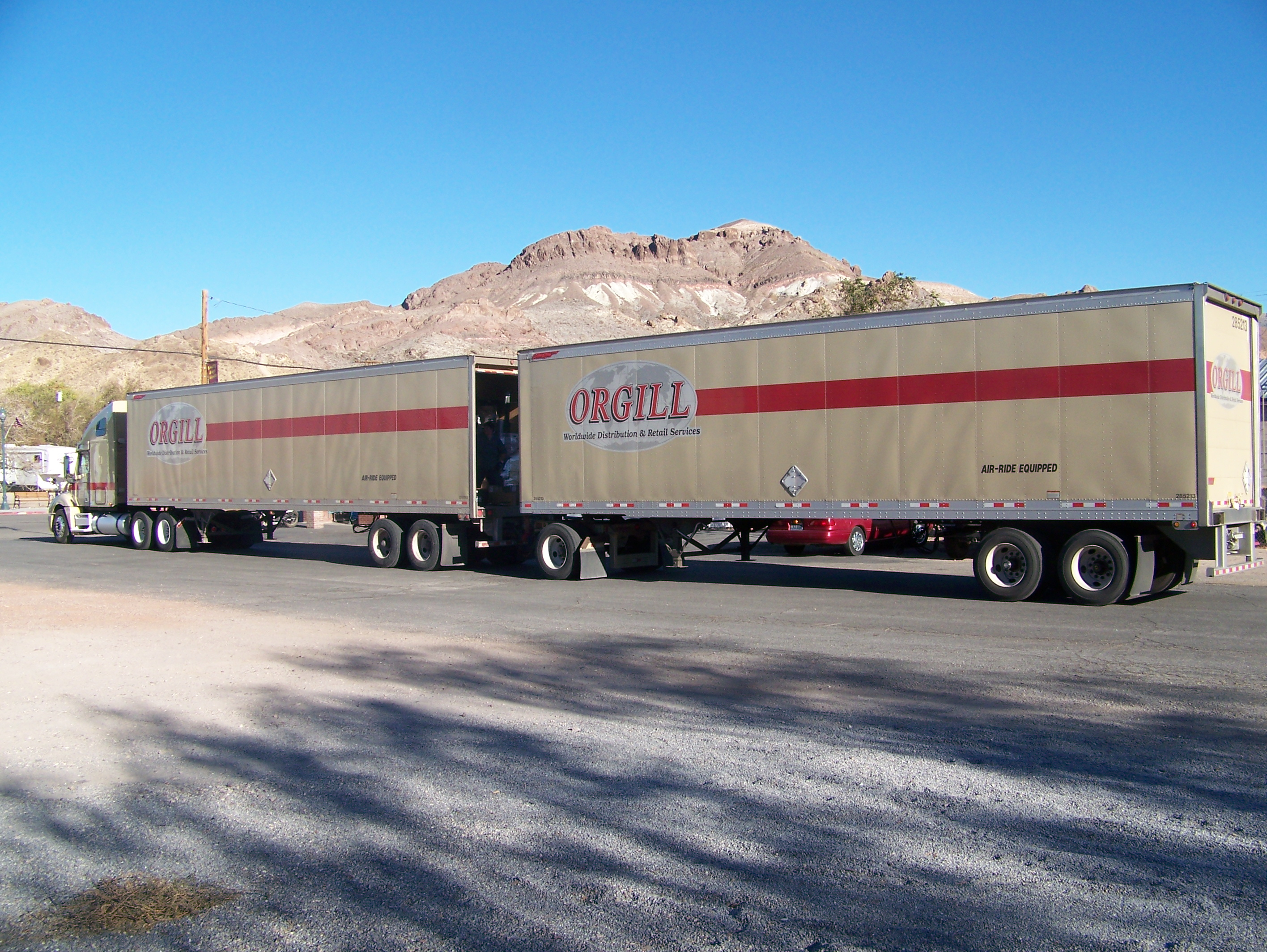
Orgill distribution truck in Beatty, Nevada

In 2005, Ron Beal became president and CEO at Orgill, and Fondren moved onto Orgill's board of directors. Orgill exceeded $1 billion in sales for the first time in 2006. Orgill added five new U.S. distribution centers in the 2000s and 2010s; in Inwood, West Virginia, (2000), Hurricane, Utah, (2005), Kilgore, Texas, (2008), Sikeston, Missouri (2009) and in Post Falls, Idaho (2017). According to the Memphis Business Journal, Orgill's revenue nearly doubled from $1.07 billion in 2007 to $2.04 billion in 2017.

In 2010, Orgill officially expanded its operations into Canada, and in 2015 Orgill acquired its London, Ontario, distribution center when it purchased the Chalifour Canada Ltd. assets from TIM-BR MART Group. In 2018, Orgill was awarded the President's "E" Award, honoring its contribution to US exports, by Commerce Secretary Wilbur Ross. In 2021, Orgill opened a 780,000-square-foot (72,000 m^{2}) distribution center in Rome, New York.

== Current business ==
In total, including subsidiaries, Orgill employs approximately 5,600 people. In 2020, the company surpassed $3 billion in annual revenue for the first time. Orgill serves more than 6,000 customers operating more than 10,000 retail hardware stores, home centers, professional lumber dealers and farm stores throughout the U.S. and Canada, and in over 50 countries around the world. Along with its eight distribution centers in the U.S. and Canada, Orgill has three export consolidation facilities.
