= Fletcher S. Bassett =

American naval office and author

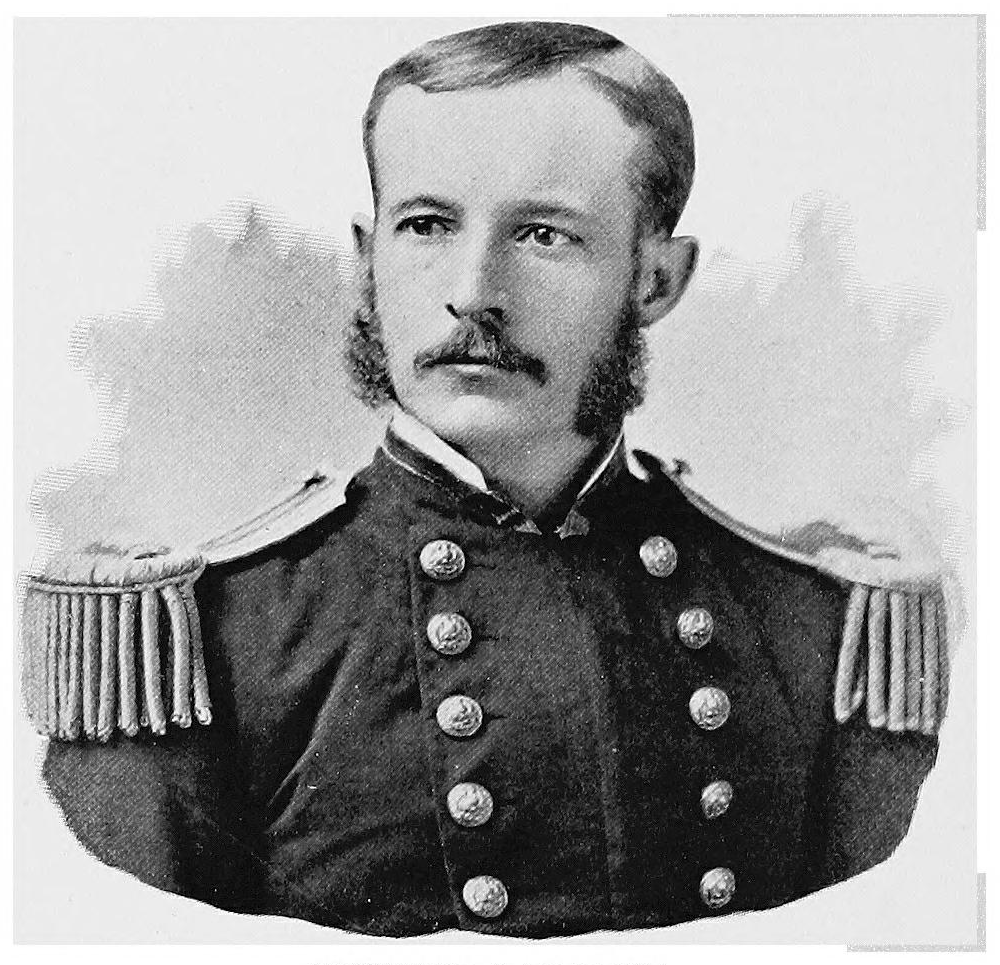
- Fletcher S. Bassett when serving on the International Folk-lore Congress
- Born: December 21, 1847; Kentucky, United States
- Died: 1893 (aged 45–46)
- Education: Monmouth College (Illinois)
- Occupations: Author; United States Navy Lieutenant
- Known for: Establishing the international Folk-Lore Congress of 1893 for the World's Columbian Exposition and founded the Chicago Folk-Lore Society

Fletcher Stewart Bassett (1847–1893) was an American naval officer and author. He was instrumental in establishing the international Folk-Lore Congress of 1893 for the World's Columbian Exposition and founded the Chicago Folk-Lore Society.

Bassett was born in Adams County, Kentucky, on December 21, 1847. He began his literary career as a Monmouth College student. He volunteered for military service at this time, participating in the American Civil War.

He first served with the 188th regiment before enlisting in the United States Navy. He was promoted to Lieutenant in 1875, and was listed as retired in 1882. While enlisted he developed as a professional writer, submitting articles to newspapers and journals, and contributing to Hammersly's Naval Encyclopedia.

His first book was Legends and Superstitions of the Sea (Chicago, London. 1885), and the subject of folklore would become a special interest. Bassett is given much credit for generating popular interest in a field that was acquiring scholarly recognition and developing as a 'science'. In 1892 he published The Folk-Lore Manual; or Questionnaire of the Folk-Lore Society, having assembled the material from a number of sources he had solicited.

He joined many international societies devoted to literature and folklore, and was active in leading and founding these. Bassett's interest and activism was in an area alive with vigorous disputes as workers sought to define the field and gain respectability for it. In these theoretical disputes, Bassett was allied with those investigating the material as literature. In founding the Chicago Folk-Lore Society in 1891, the group's charter took a literary approach to folklore, unlike that taken by similar societies, which sought to establish a scientific treatment of folklore.

Bassett's Navy experience gave him proficiency in many modern languages, and experience with foreign peoples, assets which supported his appointments as the Chief Interpreter and Translator of the World's Columbian Exposition of 1893 and chairman of the Folklore Congress of the same year.
