= John Cutting Berry =

American physician and missionary

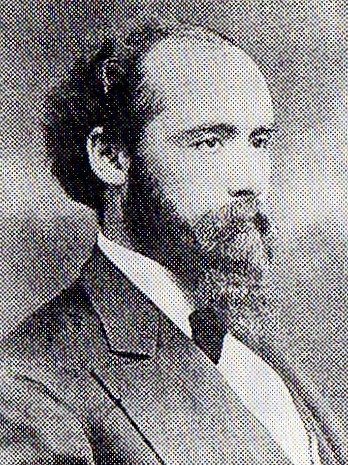

John Cutting Berry (January 16, 1847 – February 9, 1936) was an American physician and missionary. He was dispatched by the American Board to Japan, where he practiced medicine in places including Kobe, Kyoto, and Okayama. In 1911 he was awarded the Order of the Sacred Treasure, 3rd class.

== Life ==
Berry was born in the state of Maine in 1847. His father, a captain, died when he was four years old, and he was sent taken in by one of father's friends. He worked for his living from the age of 11. At the age of 17 he was baptized as a Christian. When he was 20, a ship he was riding in was caught in a storm, but he survived. Feeling that God had saved him for a reason, he resolved to dedicate the remainder of his life to God.

In 1871 he graduated from Jefferson Medical College in Philadelphia and was ordained as a missionary by the American Board. He arrived in Japan in June 1872. That July he became the medical director of the International Hospital of Kobe, (Note: The future Kobe Kaisei Hospital (神戸海星病院)) where he examined poor Japanese people for free if they would listen to him read from the Bible. Berry also established a clinic for the poor in front of Ikuta Shrine in Kobe called Keisai-in (恵済院), and, along with Japanese doctors, Japan's first charitable hospital, Ishi Yūshi Dokuritsu Byōin (医師有志独立病院) in Sanda.

On the request of Kanda Takahira, the governor of Hyōgo prefecture, Berry also took charge of Kobe Hospital (Note: The future Kobe University Hospital) and undertook other medical activities in Kobe, Himeji, Akashi, Kakogawa, Arima, and Sanda. Berry typically examined between 500 and 700 patients a month and instructed other local doctors on the side. In January 1873, Berry conducted the first human dissection in the prefecture at Kobe Hospital, before an audience of 750 doctors and medical students.

In the autumn of 1873, Berry was requested to personally inspect Kobe's prison, which was suffering an epidemic of beriberi, and was appalled by the unsanitary conditions and inhumane treatment of prisoners within. He appealed to the prefecture's governor to reform its prison system, and several more missionaries followed Berry in inspecting the prison, presenting plans to the Japanese government for prison reform. These actions were the beginning of a prison reform movement with Japan. Berry obtained the permission of Home Lord Ōkubo Toshimichi to inspect the prisons in Osaka, Kyoto, Hyōgo, and Harima, and he prepared a report on the conditions within. This report is thought to have had some influence on the methods used by Japan's system of criminal punishments.

Berry moved to Okayama in 1878, where he strove to reform the prefecture's hospitals. In 1883 he moved to Kyoto, and in 1887 became the head of Doshisha Hospital. He was also involved in the establishment of the hospital's associated women's nursing school, the first women's nursing school in Japan.

In 1893 Berry left Japan and moved back to the U.S., where he practiced eye and ear medicine and acted as a visiting doctor for less well-funded facilities. In 1911 he received the Order of the Sacred Treasure, 3rd class.

== Bibliography ==
- Tanaka, Tomoko (2012). 近代日本高等教育体制の黎明 交錯する地域と国とキリスト教界 [The Dawn of Modern Japan's Higher Education System: Blending Regions, Countries, and Christianity] (in Japanese). Shibunkaku shuppan. ISBN 978-4-7842-1618-5.
- Kōbe Gaikokujin Kyoryūchi Kenkyūkai, ed. (1999). 居留地の窓から [From the Windows of the Foreign Settlement] (in Japanese). JUNKUDO Co., Ltd.
- Kōbe Gaikokujin Kyoryūchi Kenkyūkai, ed. (2005). 神戸と居留地 多文化共生都市の原像 [Kobe and its Foreign Settlement: Origins of a Multicultural City] (in Japanese). Kōbe shimbun sōgō shuppan sentā. ISBN 978-4-343-00315-7.
- Kōbe shimbun bunka seikatsu bu, ed. (2001). ひと萌ゆる 知られざる近代兵庫の先覚者たち [A Single Sprout: The Unknown Pioneers of Modern Hyōgo] (in Japanese). Kōbe shimbun sōgō shuppan sentā. ISBN 978-4-343-00160-3.
- "Kōbe to Seisho" Henshū Iinkai, ed. (2001). 神戸と聖書 神戸・阪神間の450年の歩み [Kobe and the Bible: 450 Years of Progress in Kobe and its surroundings] (in Japanese). Kōbe shimbun sōgō shuppan sentā. ISBN 978-4-343-00137-5.
- The Japan Chronicle, ed. (1980). 神戸外国人居留地 [The Kobe Foreign Settlement] (in Japanese). Translated by Shirō Odeishi and Hiroshi Hori, commentary by Haruo Doi. Kōbe shimbun shuppan sentā.
- "Dr. Berry And His Service To Japan". The Oriental Review: 398. April 1913.
