= 1893 in the United States =

- Decades: 1870s; 1880s; 1890s; 1900s; 1910s
- See also: History of the United States (1865–1918); Timeline of United States history (1860–1899); List of years in the United States

Events from the year 1893 in the United States.

== Incumbents ==
=== Federal government ===
- President:

Benjamin Harrison (R-Indiana) (until March 4)
Grover Cleveland (D-New York) (starting March 4)

- Vice President:

Levi P. Morton (R-New York) (until March 4)
Adlai E. Stevenson I (D-Illinois) (starting March 4)

- Chief Justice: Melville Fuller (Illinois)
- Speaker of the House of Representatives: Charles Frederick Crisp (D-Georgia)
- Congress: 52nd (until March 4), 53rd (starting March 4)

==== State governments ====
Governors and lieutenant governors

=== Governors ===
- Governor of Alabama: Thomas G. Jones (Democratic)
- Governor of Arkansas: James Philip Eagle (Democratic) (until January 14), William Meade Fishback (Democratic) (starting January 14)
- Governor of California: Henry Markham (Republican)
- Governor of Colorado: John Long Routt (Republican) (until January 10), Davis Hanson Waite (People's) (starting January 10)
- Governor of Connecticut: Morgan G. Bulkeley (Republican) (until January 4), Luzon B. Morris (Democratic) (starting January 4)
- Governor of Delaware: Robert J. Reynolds (Democratic)
- Governor of Florida: Francis P. Fleming (Democratic) (until January 3), Henry L. Mitchell (Democratic) (starting January 3)
- Governor of Georgia: William J. Northen (Democratic)
- Governor of Idaho: N. B. Willey (Republican) (until January 2), William J. McConnell (Republican) (starting January 2)
- Governor of Illinois: Joseph W. Fifer (Republican) (until January 10), John Peter Altgeld (Democratic) (starting January 10)
- Governor of Indiana: Ira Joy Chase (Republican) (until January 9), Claude Matthews (Democratic) (starting January 9)
- Governor of Iowa: Horace Boies (Democratic)
- Governor of Kansas: Lyman U. Humphrey (Republican) (until January 9), Lorenzo D. Lewelling (Populist) (starting January 9)
- Governor of Kentucky: John Y. Brown (Democratic)
- Governor of Louisiana: Murphy James Foster, Sr. (Democratic)
- Governor of Maine: Edwin C. Burleigh (Republican) (until January 4), Henry B. Cleaves (Republican) (starting January 4)
- Governor of Maryland: Frank Brown (Democratic)
- Governor of Massachusetts: William E. Russell (Democratic)
- Governor of Michigan: Edwin B. Winans (Democratic) (until January 1), John T. Rich (Republican) (starting January 1)
- Governor of Minnesota: William R. Merriam (Republican) (until January 4), Knute Nelson (Republican) (starting January 4)
- Governor of Mississippi: John M. Stone (Democratic)
- Governor of Missouri: David R. Francis (Democratic) (until January 9), William Joel Stone (Democratic) (starting January 9)
- Governor of Montana: Joseph Toole (Democratic) (until January 1), John E. Rickards (Republican) (starting January 1)
- Governor of Nebraska: James E. Boyd (Democratic) (until January 13), Lorenzo Crounse (Republican) (starting January 13)
- Governor of Nevada: Roswell K. Colcord (Republican)
- Governor of New Hampshire: Hiram A. Tuttle (Republican) (until January 5), John Butler Smith (Republican) (starting January 5)
- Governor of New Jersey: Leon Abbett (Democratic) (until January 17), George Theodore Werts (Democratic) (starting January 17)
- Governor of New York: Roswell P. Flower (Democratic)
- Governor of North Carolina: Thomas Michael Holt (Democratic) (until January 18), Elias Carr (Democratic) (starting January 18)
- Governor of North Dakota: Andrew H. Burke (Republican) (until January 3), Eli C. D. Shortridge (Democratic)/(Independent) (starting January 3)
- Governor of Ohio: William McKinley (Republican)
- Governor of Oregon: Sylvester Pennoyer (Democratic)
- Governor of Pennsylvania: Robert E. Pattison (Democratic)
- Governor of Rhode Island: D. Russell Brown (Republican)
- Governor of South Carolina: Benjamin Ryan Tillman (Democratic)
- Governor of South Dakota: Arthur C. Mellette (Republican) (until January 3), Charles H. Sheldon (Republican) (starting January 3)
- Governor of Tennessee: John P. Buchanan (Democratic) (until January 16), Peter Turney (Democratic) (starting January 16)
- Governor of Texas: James Stephen Hogg (Democratic)
- Governor of Vermont: Levi K. Fuller (Republican)
- Governor of Virginia: Philip W. McKinney (Democratic)
- Governor of Washington: Elisha Peyre Ferry (Republican) (until January 11), John McGraw (Republican) (starting January 11)
- Governor of West Virginia: Aretas B. Fleming (Democratic) (until March 4), William A. MacCorkle (Democratic) (starting March 4)
- Governor of Wisconsin: George W. Peck (Democratic)
- Governor of Wyoming: Amos W. Barber (Republican) (until January 2), John E. Osborne (Democratic) (starting January 2)

=== Lieutenant governors ===
- Lieutenant Governor of California: John B. Reddick (Republican)
- Lieutenant Governor of Colorado: William Story (Republican) (until January 10), David Hopkinson Nichols (Democratic) (starting January 10)
- Lieutenant Governor of Connecticut: Samuel E. Merwin (Republican) (until January 4), Ernest Cady (Democratic) (starting January 4)
- Lieutenant Governor of Idaho: John S. Gray (Republican) (until January 2), F. B. Willis (Republican) (starting January 2)
- Lieutenant Governor of Illinois: Lyman Ray (Republican) (until month and day unknown), Joseph B. Gill (Democratic) (starting month and day unknown)
- Lieutenant Governor of Indiana: Francis M. Griffith (Republican) (until January 9), Mortimer Nye (Democratic) (starting January 9)
- Lieutenant Governor of Iowa: Samuel L. Bestow (Democratic)
- Lieutenant Governor of Kansas: Andrew J. Felt (Republican) (until January 8), Percy Daniels (Populist) (starting January 8)
- Lieutenant Governor of Kentucky: Mitchell Cary Alford (Democratic)
- Lieutenant Governor of Louisiana: Charles Parlange (Democratic) (until month and day unknown), Hiram R. Lott (Democratic) (starting month and day unknown)
- Lieutenant Governor of Massachusetts: William H. Haile (Republican) (until month and day unknown), Roger Wolcott (Republican) (starting month and day unknown)
- Lieutenant Governor of Michigan: John Strong (Democratic) (until January 1), J. Wight Giddings (Republican) (starting January 1)
- Lieutenant Governor of Minnesota: Gideon S. Ives (Republican) (until January 3), David M. Clough (Republican) (starting January 3)
- Lieutenant Governor of Mississippi: M. M. Evans (Democratic)
- Lieutenant Governor of Missouri: Stephen Hugh Claycomb (Democratic) (until January 9), John B. O'Meara (Democratic) (starting January 9)
- Lieutenant Governor of Montana: John E. Rickards (Republican) (until month and day unknown), Alexander Campbell Botkin (Republican) (starting month and day unknown)
- Lieutenant Governor of Nebraska: Thomas J. Majors (Republican)
- Lieutenant Governor of Nevada: Joseph Poujade (political party unknown)
- Lieutenant Governor of New York: William F. Sheehan (Democratic)
- Lieutenant Governor of North Carolina: vacant (until January 18), Rufus A. Doughton (Democratic) (starting January 18)
- Lieutenant Governor of North Dakota: Roger Allin (Republican) (until January 3), Elmer D. Wallace (Democratic) (starting January 3)
- Lieutenant Governor of Ohio: Andrew L. Harris (Republican)
- Lieutenant Governor of Pennsylvania: Louis Arthur Watres (Republican)
- Lieutenant Governor of Rhode Island: Melville Bull (Republican)
- Lieutenant Governor of South Carolina: Eugene B. Gary (Democratic) (until December 22), Washington H. Timmerman (Democratic) (starting December 22)
- Lieutenant Governor of South Dakota: George H. Hoffman (Republican) (until January 3), Charles N. Herreid (Republican) (starting January 3)
- Lieutenant Governor of Tennessee: William C. Dismukes (Democratic)
- Lieutenant Governor of Texas: George Cassety Pendleton (Democratic) (until January 17), Martin McNulty Crane (Democratic) (starting January 17)
- Lieutenant Governor of Vermont: F. Stewart Stranahan (Republican)
- Lieutenant Governor of Virginia: James Hoge Tyler (Democratic)
- Lieutenant Governor of Washington: Charles E. Laughton (Republican) (until January 11), F. H. Luce (Republican) (starting January 11)
- Lieutenant Governor of Wisconsin: Charles Jonas (Democratic)

== Events ==
=== January–March ===
March 4: Grover Cleveland, formerly the 22nd U.S. president, becomes the 24th president

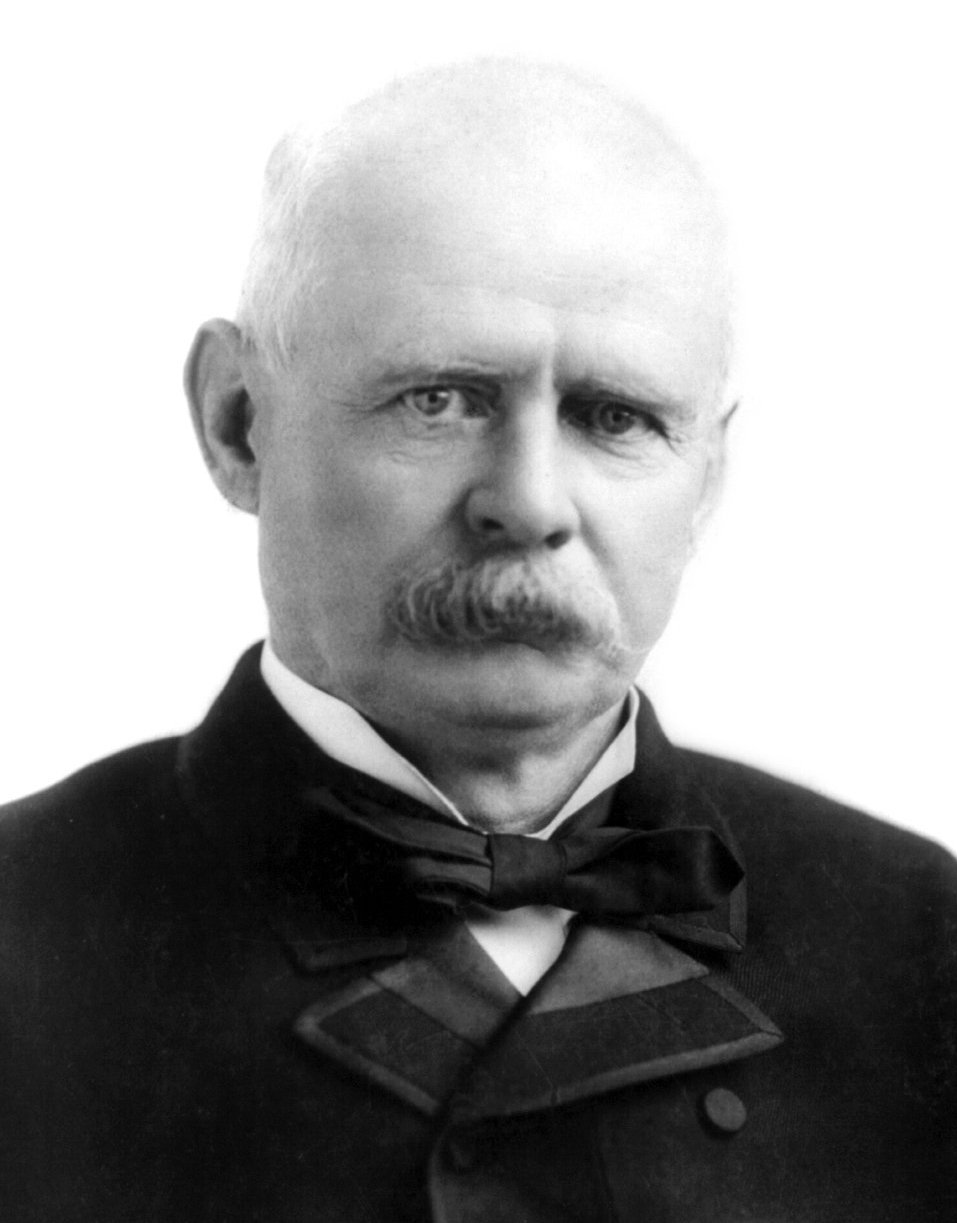
Adlai Stevenson I becomes the 23rd U.S. vice president.

- January 2 – Webb C. Ball introduces railroad chronometers, which become the general railroad timepiece standards in North America.
- January 17 – The U.S. Marines intervene in Hawaii, resulting in overthrow of the government of Queen Liliuokalani of Hawaii.
- January 21 – The Cherry Sisters first perform in Marion, Iowa.
- February 1 – Thomas A. Edison finishes construction of the first motion picture studio in West Orange, New Jersey.
- February 24 – American University is established by an Act of Congress in Washington, D.C.
- February 28 – USS Indiana, the lead ship of her class and the first battleship in the United States Navy comparable to foreign battleships of this time, is launched at Philadelphia; she is commissioned in 1895.
- March 4 – Grover Cleveland is sworn in as the 24th president of the United States, and Adlai E. Stevenson is sworn in as the 23rd vice president of the United States.

=== April–June ===
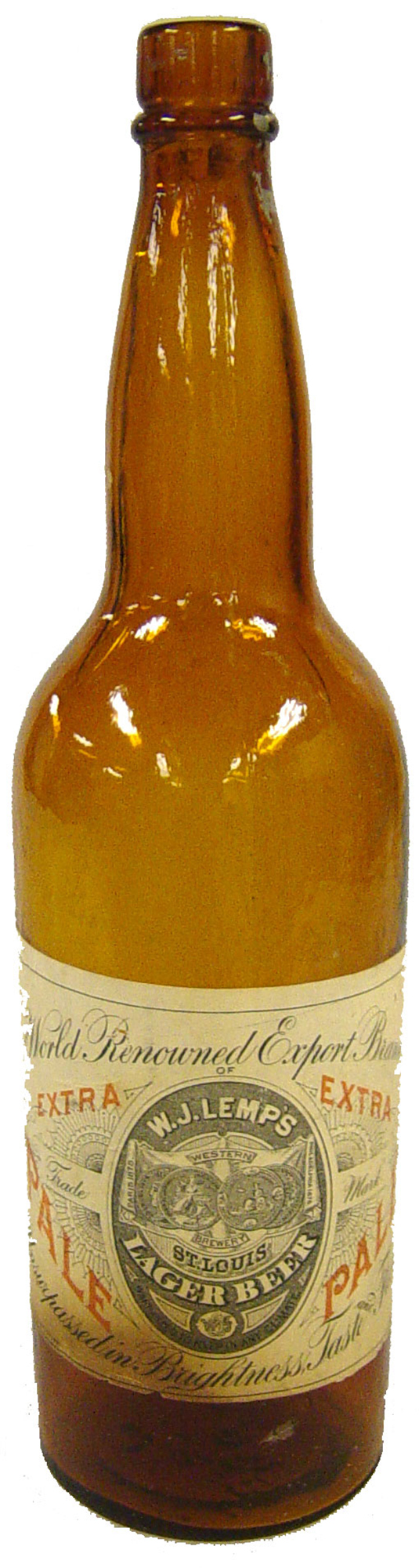
1893 beer bottle, found in Arizona with a prohibition booklet wrapped around it.

- April 1 – The rank of Chief Petty Officer is established in the U.S. Navy.
- April 8 – The first recorded college basketball game occurs in Beaver Falls, Pennsylvania between the Geneva College Covenanters and the New Brighton YMCA.
- May 1 – The 1893 World's Fair, also known as the World's Columbian Exposition, opens to the public in Chicago, Illinois. The first U.S. commemorative postage stamps and Coins are issued for the Exposition. Pabst Blue Ribbon wins an award for the best beer.
- May 5 – Panic of 1893: A crash on the New York Stock Exchange starts a depression.
- May 9 – Edison's 1½ inch system of Kinetoscope is first demonstrated in public at the Brooklyn Institute.
- May 10 – Nix v. Hedden: the United States Supreme Court legally declares the tomato to be a vegetable.
- June 9 – The front part of Ford's Theatre in Washington, D.C. collapses, killing 22 War Department clerks and injuring 68 others.
- June 20 – Lizzie Borden is found not guilty for the murder of her father and step-mother in New Bedford, Massachusetts.

=== July–December ===
- July 1 – U.S. President Grover Cleveland has a secret operation to remove cancer in his mouth.
- July 6 – The small town of Pomeroy, Iowa is nearly destroyed by a tornado; 71 people are killed and 200 injured.
- July 12 – Frederick Jackson Turner gives a lecture titled "The Significance of the Frontier in American History" before the American Historical Association in Chicago.
- July 22 – Katharine Lee Bates writes "America the Beautiful", after admiring the view from the top of Pikes Peak, near Colorado Springs.
- August 27 – The Sea Islands Hurricane hits Savannah, Charleston, and the Sea Islands, killing 1,000–2,000.
- September 9 – First Lady Frances Cleveland gives birth in the White House to daughter Esther Cleveland.
- September 11–27 – The World Parliament of Religions opens in Chicago.
- September 11 – Standing ovation to Hindu monk Swami Vivekanda for his address in response to the welcome at the World Parliament of Religions in Chicago.
- September 19 – Swami Vivekananda delivers an inspiring speech on his paper at the World Parliament of Religions in Chicago.
- September 21 – Brothers Charles and Frank Duryea drive the first gasoline-powered motorcar in America on public roads in Springfield, Massachusetts.
- September 23 – The Baháʼí Faith is first publicly mentioned in the United States at the World Parliament of Religions in Chicago.
- December 8 – The National Education Association releases the final report from the Committee of Ten at a conference at Columbia University, recommending standardization of the high school curriculum.

=== Undated ===
- Sisters Patty and Mildred J. Hill publish Song Stories for the Kindergarten including "Good Morning to All", which later becomes known as "Happy Birthday to You".
- The American National Sculpture Society (NSS) is founded.
- T.M.I.: The Episcopal School of Texas is founded.
- Chicago Metallic Corporation is founded.
- Colored High becomes the first African American high school in Houston, Texas; its name is later changed to Booker T. Washington High School.
- The American Council on Alcohol Problems is established, along with the Anti-Saloon League and the Committee of Fifty for the Study of the Liquor Problem.
- American Temperance University is opened in Harriman, Tennessee.

=== Ongoing ===
- Gilded Age (1869–c. 1896)
- Gay Nineties (1890–1899)
- Progressive Era (1890s–1920s)
- Panic of 1893 (1893–1894)
- Garza Revolution in Texas and Mexico (1891–1893)

== Births ==
- January 11 – Anthony M. Rud, writer (died 1942)
- January 12 – Edward Selzer, film producer (died 1970)
- January 18 – Thomas E. Martin, U.S. Senator from Iowa from 1955 to 1961 (died 1971)
- January 23 – Frank Carlson, U.S. Senator from Kansas from 1950 to 1969 (died 1987)
- February 10
  - Jimmy Durante, actor, singer and comedian (died 1980)
  - Bill Tilden, tennis player (died 1953)
- March 14 – Arthur C. Davis, admiral (died 1965)
- March 27 – Lloyd Spencer, U.S. Senator from Arkansas from 1941 to 1943 (died 1981)
- April 20
  - Harold Lloyd, actor (died 1971)
  - Edna Parker, supercentenarian (died 2008)
- April 23 – Allen Dulles, Central Intelligence Agency director (died 1969)
- April 29 – Harold Urey, chemist, recipient of Nobel Prize in 1934 (died 1981)
- May 23 – Ulysses S. Grant IV, geologist and paleontologist (died 1977)
- June 14 – Siggie Nordstrom, model, actress, entertainer, socialite and singer (died 1980)
- June 24
  - Roy O. Disney, partner in Walt Disney Productions (died 1971)
  - Suzanne La Follette, libertarian feminist (died 1983)
- June 26 – Big Bill Broonzy, blues singer and composer (died 1958)
- July 9 – Dorothy Thompson, journalist and radio commentator (died 1961)
- July 12 – John Gould Moyer, naval officer, 31st Governor of American Samoa (died 1976)
- July 18
  - Orrice Abram Murdock Jr., politician (died 1979)
  - Richard Dix, actor (died 1949)
  - Walter Hiers, actor (died 1933)
- August 14 – Carl Benton Reid, actor (died 1973)
- August 17 – Mae West, film actress (died 1980)
- August 20 – Robert Humphreys, U.S. Senator from Kentucky in 1956 (died 1977)
- August 22 – Dorothy Parker, writer (died 1967)
- August 30 – Huey Long, U.S. Senator from Louisiana from 1932 to 1935 (died 1935)
- August 31 – Raymond E. Baldwin, U.S. Senator from Connecticut from 1946 to 1949 (died 1986)
- September 6 – John W. Bricker, U.S. Senator from Ohio from 1947 to 1959 (died 1986)
- September 12 – Frederick William Franz, President of Jehovah's Witnesses (died 1992)
- September 13 – Larry Shields, musician (died 1953)
- September 24 – Blind Lemon Jefferson, blues and gospel singer-songwriter (died 1929)
- September 30 – Lansdale Sasscer, U.S. Congressman from Maryland (died 1964)
- October 2 – Lester Dragstedt, surgeon (died 1975)
- October 14
  - Lillian Gish, actress, "First Lady of American Cinema" (died 1993)
  - Lois Lenski, author and illustrator (died 1974)
- October 23 – Gummo Marx, vaudevillian and theatrical agent (died 1977)
- November 10 – John P. Marquand, novelist (died 1960)
- November 14 – Addie Viola Smith, attorney and trade envoy (died 1975 in Australia)
- November 24 – Fern Andra, actress (died 1974)
- December 1 – Henry J. Cadbury, Quaker biblical scholar (died 1974)
- December 3 – Walter Stuart Diehl, naval officer and aeronautical engineer (died 1976)
- Unknown – Edward Joseph Renehan Sr., banker (died 1953)

== Deaths ==
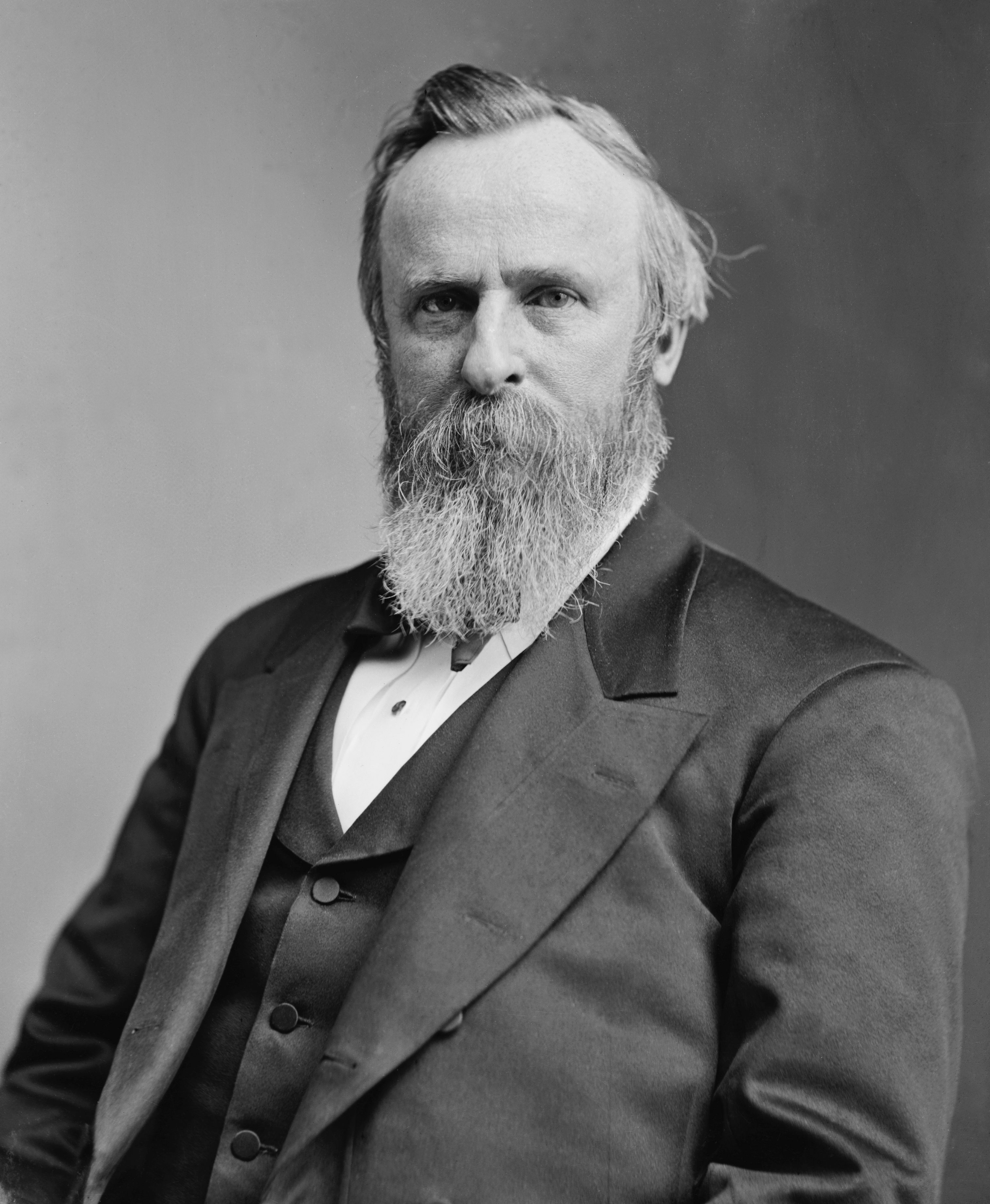
Rutherford B. Hayes

- January 11 – Benjamin Butler, major general of the Union Army during the American Civil War, and for his leader in the impeachment of Andrew Johnson (born 1818)
- January 17 – Rutherford B. Hayes, 19th president of the U.S. from 1877 to 1881 (born 1822)
- January 23 – Phillips Brooks, Episcopal clergyman (born 1835)
- January 27 – James G. Blaine, U.S. Senator from Maine from 1876 to 1881 and Secretary of State in 1881 and from 1889 to 1892 (born 1830)
- February 1 – Joseph P. Comegys, U.S. Senator from Delaware from 1856 to 1857 (born 1813)
- February 10 – Henry Churchill de Mille, American dramatist and playwright (born 1853)
- February 19 – George E. Spencer, U.S. Senator from Alabama from 1868 to 1879 (born 1836)
- February 20 – P. G. T. Beauregard, Southern military officer, politician, inventor, writer, civil servant, and the first prominent general of the Confederate States Army during the American Civil War (born 1818)
- March 2 – Richard M. Bishop, 34th Governor of Ohio from 1878 to 1880 (born 1812)
- March 18 – David H. Armstrong, Canadian-born U.S. Senator from Missouri from 1877 to 1879 (born 1812)
- March 21 – Mary Foot Seymour, American businesswoman and journalist (born 1846)
- March 22 – Eli Saulsbury, U.S. Senator from Delaware from 1871 to 1889 (born 1817)
- March 28 – Edmund Kirby Smith, career United States Army officer who served with the Confederates during the American Civil War (born 1824)
- April 4 – David Meriwether, U.S. Senator from Kentucky in 1852 (born 1800)
- June 7 – Edwin Booth, actor (born 1833)
- June 21 – Leland Stanford, U.S. Senator from California from 1885 to 1893 (born 1824)
- July 2 – Georgiana Drew, comic actress (born 1856)
- July 17 – Frederick A. Johnson, politician and banker. (born 1833)
- July 19 – Charles Colcock Jones, Jr., Georgia politician, attorney, historian and folklorist (born 1831)
- August 10 – Robert Cornelius, pioneer of photography (born 1809)
- August 20 – Brother Azarias, educator (born 1847)
- September 29 – Willis Benson Machen, U.S. Senator from Kentucky from 1872 to 1873 (born 1810)
- October 18 – Lucy Stone, social reformer (born 1818)
- November 11 – Charles H. Bell, U.S. Senator from New Hampshire in 1879 (born 1823)
- November 22 – James Calder, 5th president of the Pennsylvania State University (born 1826)
- December 2 – Pauline Cushman, actress and Union spy (born 1833)
- December 7 – David Jewett Waller Sr., Presbyterian minister and businessman (born 1815)
- December 16 – James Black, temperance movement leader (born 1823)

== See also ==
- List of American films of the 1890s
- Timeline of United States history (1860–1899)
