= 1823 in the United States =

- Decades: 1800s; 1810s; 1820s; 1830s; 1840s
- See also: History of the United States (1789–1849); Timeline of United States history (1820–1859); List of years in the United States

Events from the year 1823 in the United States.

== Incumbents ==
=== Federal government ===
- President: James Monroe (DR-Virginia)
- Vice President: Daniel D. Tompkins (DR-New York)
- Chief Justice: John Marshall (Virginia)
- Speaker of the House of Representatives:

Philip P. Barbour (DR-Virginia) (until March 4)
Henry Clay (DR-Kentucky) (starting December 1)

- Congress: 17th (until March 4), 18th (starting March 4)

==== State governments ====
Governors and lieutenant governors

=== Governors ===
- Governor of Alabama: Israel Pickens (Democratic-Republican)
- Governor of Connecticut: Oliver Wolcott Jr. (Toleration)
- Governor of Delaware:
  - until January 21: Caleb Rodney (Federalist)
  - January 21-June 20: Joseph Haslet (Democratic-Republican)
  - June 20-24: vacant
  - starting June 24: Charles Thomas (Democratic-Republican)
- Governor of Georgia: John Clark (Democratic-Republican) (until November 7), George M. Troup (Democratic-Republican) (starting November 7)
- Governor of Illinois: Edward Coles (Independent)
- Governor of Indiana: William Hendricks (Democratic-Republican)
- Governor of Kentucky: John Adair (Democratic-Republican)
- Governor of Louisiana: Thomas Bolling Robertson (Democratic-Republican)
- Governor of Maine: Albion K. Parris (Democratic-Republican)
- Governor of Maryland: Samuel Stevens Jr. (Democratic)
- Governor of Massachusetts: John Brooks (Federalist) (until May 31), William Eustis (Democratic-Republican) (starting May 31)
- Governor of Mississippi: Walter Leake (Democratic-Republican)
- Governor of Missouri: Alexander McNair (Democratic-Republican)
- Governor of New Hampshire: Samuel Bell (Democratic-Republican) (until June 5), Levi Woodbury (Democratic-Republican) (starting June 5)
- Governor of New Jersey: Isaac Halstead Williamson (Federalist)
- Governor of New York: Joseph C. Yates (Democratic-Republican) (starting January 1)
- Governor of North Carolina: Gabriel Holmes (Democratic-Republican)
- Governor of Ohio: Jeremiah Morrow (Democratic-Republican)
- Governor of Pennsylvania: Joseph Hiester (Democratic-Republican) (until December 16), John Andrew Shulze (Democratic-Republican) (starting December 16)
- Governor of Rhode Island: William C. Gibbs (Democratic-Republican)
- Governor of South Carolina: John Lyde Wilson (Democratic-Republican)
- Governor of Tennessee: William Carroll (Democratic-Republican)
- Governor of Vermont: Richard Skinner (Democratic-Republican) (until October 10), Cornelius P. Van Ness (Democratic-Republican) (until October 10)
- Governor of Virginia: James Pleasants (Democratic-Republican)

=== Lieutenant governors ===
- Lieutenant Governor of Connecticut: Jonathan Ingersoll (Democratic-Republican) (until month and day unknown), David Plant (National Republican) (starting month and day unknown)
- Lieutenant Governor of Illinois: Adolphus Hubbard (Democratic-Republican)
- Lieutenant Governor of Indiana: Ratliff Boon (Democratic-Republican)
- Lieutenant Governor of Kentucky: William T. Barry (political party unknown)
- Lieutenant Governor of Massachusetts: William Phillips Jr. (political party unknown) (until month and day unknown), Levi Lincoln Jr. (political party unknown) (starting month and day unknown)
- Lieutenant Governor of Mississippi: David Dickson (no political party)
- Lieutenant Governor of Missouri: William Henry Ashley (Democratic-Republican)
- Lieutenant Governor of New York: Erastus Root (Democratic-Republican) (starting January 1)
- Lieutenant Governor of Rhode Island: Caleb Earle (political party unknown)
- Lieutenant Governor of South Carolina: Henry Bradley (Democratic-Republican)
- Lieutenant Governor of Vermont: Aaron Leland (Democratic-Republican)

== Events ==
- February 3 – Jackson Male Academy, precursor of Union University, opens in Tennessee.
- February 28 – Johnson v. McIntosh decided in the Marshall Court, a landmark Supreme Court decision relating to enduring aboriginal title and tribal sovereignty in the United States.
- August 4 – Felipe Enrique Neri, Baron de Bastrop, the Mexican government administrator in charge of Anglo-American immigration into Mexico's state of Coahuila y Tejas, allows Stephen F. Austin to put together an 11-man police force, that will later be expanded to become the Texas Ranger Division.
- August 9 – The Arikara War breaks out between the Arikara nation and the United States, the first American military conflict with the Plains Indians.
- August 23 – Hugh Glass is attacked and mauled by a sow grizzly bear and left for dead in the Missouri Territory. He crawls 200 miles before reaching help, events depicted in The Revenant (2015 film).
- September 22 – Joseph Smith first goes to the place near Manchester, New York, where the golden plates are stored, having been directed there by God through an angel (according to what he writes in 1838).
- November 15 – Lone Horn succeeds (probably) his father, and becomes chief of the Minneconjou Sioux; he will be chief until his death on October 16, 1875.
- December 2 – Monroe Doctrine: U.S. President James Monroe delivers a speech to the U.S. Congress, announcing a new policy of forbidding European interference in the Americas and establishing American neutrality in future European conflicts.
- December 23 – The poem A Visit From St. Nicholas, attributed to Clement Clarke Moore, is first published.

=== Undated ===
- Orford Parish of East Hartford, Connecticut separates and is incorporated as the Town of Manchester by a special act of the Connecticut General Assembly.
- Middlebury College, Vermont, becomes the first U.S. institution of higher education to grant a bachelor's degree to an African American, graduating Alexander Twilight.
- John Neal publishes the historical novel Seventy-Six, noted for its use of colloquial language, including the phrase "son-of-a-bitch."

=== Ongoing ===
- Era of Good Feelings (1817–1825)
- A. B. plot (1823–1824)

== Births ==
- January 23 – Dan Rice, clown (died 1900)
- January 28 – Philip Spencer, founder of Chi Psi fraternity and midshipman aboard USS Somers (died 1842)
- February 3 – Spencer Fullerton Baird, zoologist (died 1887)
- February 5 – Rachel Crane Mather, educator (died 1903)
- March 23 – Schuyler Colfax, 17th vice president of the United States from 1869 to 1873 (died 1885)
- April 1 – Simon Bolivar Buckner, soldier, politician and Confederate soldier (died 1914)
- April 3 – William M. Tweed, politician (died 1878)
- May 10 – John Sherman, 32nd United States Secretary of the Treasury, 35th United States Secretary of State (died 1900)
- May 15 – Thomas Lake Harris, poet (died 1906)
- May 22 – Solomon Bundy, politician (died 1889)
- May 26 – William Pryor Letchworth, businessman and philanthropist (died 1910)
- July 1 – Charles B. Farwell, U.S. Senator from Illinois from 1887 to 1891 (died 1903)
- July 9 (date uncertain) – Phineas Gage, improbable head injury survivor (died 1860)
- July 18 – Leonard Fulton Ross, Civil War general (died 1901)
- July 24 – Arthur I. Boreman, U.S. Senator from West Virginia from 1869 to 1875 (died 1896)
- August 3 – Thomas Francis Meagher, Civil War general (died 1867)
- August 4 – Oliver P. Morton, U.S. Senator from Indiana from 1867 to 1877 (died 1877)
- August 5 – Eliza Tibbets, mother of the California orange industry (died 1898)
- August 15 – Orris S. Ferry, Civil War general and U.S. Senator from Connecticut from 1867 to 1875 (died 1875)
- September 14 – Benjamin Harvey Hill, U.S. Senator from Georgia from 1877 to 1882 (died 1882)
- September 15 – Hugh Buchanan, politician from Georgia (died 1890)
- September 23
  - James Black, temperance leader (died 1893)
  - Sara Jane Lippincott, author, poet, correspondent, lecturer and newspaper founder (died 1904)
- September 27
  - Frederick H. Billings, lawyer and financier (died 1890)
  - Augusta Harvey Worthen, author and educator (died 1910)
- October 6 – George Henry Boker, poet, playwright and diplomat (died 1890)
- November 16 – Henry G. Davis, politician (died 1916)
- November 18 – Charles H. Bell, U.S. Senator from New Hampshire in 1879 (died 1893)
- November 23 – Eliza Hendricks, Second Lady of the United States (died 1903)
- November 25 – Henry Wirz, Confederate military officer, prisoner-of-war camp commander (died 1865)
- December 22 – Thomas Wentworth Higginson, Unitarian minister and abolitionist (died 1911)
- December 23 – Thomas W. Evans, dentist (died 1897 in France)
- December 28 – Thomas A. Scott, businessman and politician, President of the Pennsylvania Railroad from 1874 to 1880 (died 1882)

== Deaths ==
- January 19 – Yarrow Mamout, a literate Fulani Muslim trafficked to Maryland in 1752, manumitted in 1796 and died at Georgetown (born c. 1736)
- January 21 – Gideon Olin, politician (born 1743)
- April 18 – George Cabot, merchant, seaman and U.S. Senator from Massachusetts from 1791 to 1796 (born 1752)
- April 23 – John Williams Walker, U.S. Senator from Alabama from 1819 to 1822 (born 1783)
- September 28 – Charlotte Melmoth, tragic actress (born 1749 in Great Britain)
- October 8 – Martin D. Hardin, U.S. Senator from Kentucky from 1816 to 1817 (born 1780)

== See also ==
- Timeline of United States history (1820–1859)
