= 1824 in the United States =

- Decades: 1800s; 1810s; 1820s; 1830s; 1840s
- See also: History of the United States (1789–1849); Timeline of United States history (1820–1859); List of years in the United States

Events from the year 1824 in the United States.

== Incumbents ==
=== Federal government ===
- President: James Monroe (DR-Virginia)
- Vice President: Daniel D. Tompkins (DR-New York)
- Chief Justice: John Marshall (Virginia)
- Speaker of the House of Representatives: Henry Clay (DR-Kentucky)
- Congress: 18th

==== State governments ====
Governors and lieutenant governors

=== Governors ===
- Governor of Alabama: Israel Pickens (Democratic-Republican)
- Governor of Connecticut: Oliver Wolcott Jr. (Toleration)
- Governor of Delaware: Charles Thomas (Democratic-Republican) (until January 20), Samuel Paynter (Federalist) (starting January 20)
- Governor of Georgia: George M. Troup (Democratic-Republican)
- Governor of Illinois: Edward Coles (Independent)
- Governor of Indiana: William Hendricks (Democratic-Republican)
- Governor of Kentucky: John Adair (Democratic-Republican) (until August 24), Joseph Desha (Democratic-Republican) (starting August 24)
- Governor of Louisiana:
  - until November 15: Thomas Bolling Robertson (Democratic-Republican)
  - November 15-December 13: Henry S. Thibodaux (National Republican)
  - starting December 13: Henry Johnson (National Republican)
- Governor of Maine: Albion K. Parris (Democratic-Republican)
- Governor of Maryland: Samuel Stevens Jr. (Democratic)
- Governor of Massachusetts: William Eustis (Democratic-Republican)
- Governor of Mississippi: Walter Leake (Democratic-Republican)
- Governor of Missouri: Alexander McNair (Democratic-Republican) (until November 15), Frederick Bates (Democratic-Republican) (starting November 15)
- Governor of New Hampshire: Levi Woodbury (Democratic-Republican) (until June 3), David L. Morril (Democratic-Republican) (starting June 3)
- Governor of New Jersey: Isaac Halstead Williamson (Federalist)
- Governor of New York: Joseph C. Yates (Democratic-Republican) (until end of December 31)
- Governor of North Carolina: Gabriel Holmes (Democratic-Republican) (until December 7), Hutchins Gordon Burton (no political party) (starting December 7)
- Governor of Ohio: Jeremiah Morrow (Democratic-Republican)
- Governor of Pennsylvania: John Andrew Shulze (Democratic-Republican)
- Governor of Rhode Island: William C. Gibbs (Democratic-Republican) (until May 5), James Fenner (Democratic-Republican) (starting May 5)
- Governor of South Carolina: John Lyde Wilson (Democratic-Republican) (until December 3), Richard Irvine Manning I (Democratic-Republican) (starting December 3)
- Governor of Tennessee: William Carroll (Democratic-Republican)
- Governor of Vermont: Cornelius P. Van Ness (Democratic-Republican)
- Governor of Virginia: James Pleasants (Democratic-Republican)

=== Lieutenant governors ===
- Lieutenant Governor of Connecticut: David Plant (National Republican)
- Lieutenant Governor of Illinois: Adolphus Hubbard (Democratic-Republican)
- Lieutenant Governor of Indiana: Ratliff Boon (Democratic-Republican) (until January 30), vacant (starting January 30)
- Lieutenant Governor of Kentucky: William T. Barry (Democratic-Republican) (until August 24), Robert B. McAfee (Democratic-Republican) (starting August 24)
- Lieutenant Governor of Massachusetts: Levi Lincoln Jr. (political party unknown) (until month and day unknown), Marcus Morton (political party unknown) (starting month and day unknown)
- Lieutenant Governor of Mississippi: David Dickson (no political party) (until month and day unknown), Gerard C. Brandon (no political party) (starting month and day unknown)
- Lieutenant Governor of Missouri: William Henry Ashley (Democratic-Republican) (until November 15), Benjamin Harrison Reeves (Democratic-Republican) (starting November 15)
- Lieutenant Governor of New York: Erastus Root (Democratic-Republican) (until end of December 31)
- Lieutenant Governor of Rhode Island: Caleb Earle (political party unknown) (until May 5), Charles Collins (political party unknown) (starting May 5)
- Lieutenant Governor of South Carolina: Henry Bradley (Democratic-Republican) (until December 3), William Bull (Democratic-Republican) (starting December 3)
- Lieutenant Governor of Vermont: Aaron Leland (Democratic-Republican)

== Events ==
- March 11 – U.S. Bureau of Indian Affairs formed by John C. Calhoun without authorization from Congress.
- April – The United States Literary Gazette, a semi-monthly, begins publication. It publishes poetry by Henry Wadsworth Longfellow and William Cullen Bryant, among many others.
- April 15 – To defend the Cherokees' possession of their land, chief John Ross petitions Congress, fundamentally altering the traditional relationship between an Indian nation and whites.
- May 15 – A boiler explosion occurs on the steamship Aetna, under way in Upper New York Bay, killing more than ten passengers and injuring many more.
- May 26 – Arkansas Territory split creates Indian Territory.
- August 16 – Lafayette begins his tour of the United States, departing on September 7, 1825.
- October 26 – 1824 United States presidential election opens. Andrew Jackson will receive more popular votes than John Quincy Adams in the first election in which this vote is reported.
- November 1 – Miami University (chartered 1809) delivers its first classes in Oxford, Ohio.
- November 5 – Stephen Van Rensselaer establishes the Rensselaer School, which becomes the Rensselaer Polytechnic Institute – the oldest technological university in the English-speaking world.
- November 15 – Quapaw cede a considerable tract between the Arkansas and the Saline River.
- December 1 – 1824 United States presidential election: Since no candidate received a majority of the total electoral college votes in the election, the United States House of Representatives is given the task to decide the winner (as stipulated by the Twelfth Amendment to the United States Constitution).
- December 24 – The Chi Phi (ΧΦ) Fraternity is founded at Princeton University.

=== Undated ===
- Iowa tribe removed to a reservation in Kansas.
- A treaty between several tribes and the United States Government establish a Half-Breed Tract in present-day Lee County, Iowa.
- Harmony Society establishes the settlement of Economy, Pennsylvania.
- Thomas Say begins publication of American Entomology, or Descriptions of the Insects of North America in Philadelphia, including the first description of the Colorado potato beetle.

=== Ongoing ===
- Era of Good Feelings (1817–1825)
- A. B. plot (1823–1824)
- John Neal publishing serially the first written history of American literature, American Writers (1824–1825)

== Births ==
- January 21 – Stonewall Jackson, Confederate general (died 1863)
- February 14 – Winfield Scott Hancock, Civil War Union general and political candidate (died 1886)
- March 9 – Leland Stanford, tycoon, U.S. Senator from California from 1885 to 1893 (died 1893)
- March 25 – Clinton L. Merriam, politician (died 1900)
- March 26 – Levi P. Morton, the 22nd vice president of the United States from 1889 to 1893 (died 1920)
- March 31 – William Morris Hunt, painter (died 1879)
- April 20 – Alfred H. Colquitt, U.S. Senator from Georgia from 1883 to 1894 (died 1894)
- May 16 – Edmund Kirby Smith, career United States Army officer who serves with the Confederates during the American Civil War (died 1893)
- May 23 – Ambrose Burnside, Union Army general, railroad executive, inventor, industrialist and Rhode Island Senator (died 1881)
- June 20 – John Tyler Morgan, U.S. Senator from Alabama from 1877 to 1907 (died 1907)
- July 21 – Stanley Matthews, politician and Associate Justice of the Supreme Court of the United States (died 1889)
- July 25
  - Richard J. Oglesby, U.S. Senator from Illinois from 1873 to 1878 (died 1899)
  - George Boyer Vashon, African American lawyer, abolitionist, poet and scholar (died 1878)
- August 7 – Gideon T. Stewart, temperance movement leader (died 1907)
- August 15 – Charles Godfrey Leland, folklorist (died 1903)
- September 4 – Phoebe Cary, poet, sister to Alice Cary (1820–1871) (died 1871)
- September 27 – Benjamin Apthorp Gould, astronomer (died 1896)
- October 2 – Henry C. Lord, railroad executive (died 1884)
- October 5 – Henry Chadwick, baseball writer and historian (died 1908)
- December 11 – Jonathan Letterman, surgeon and "Father of Battlefield Medicine" (died 1872)

== Deaths ==
- March 2 – Susanna Rowson, novelist, poet and playwright (born 1762)
- April 3 – Sally Seymour, pastry chef and restaurateur
- July 14 – Kamehameha II, King of Hawaii (born 1797 in Hawaii; died in London)
- August 12 – Charles Nerinckx, founder of the Sisters of Loretto (born 1761 in Flanders)
- December 24 – Pushmataha, Choctaw chief (born c. 1764)

== See also ==
- Timeline of United States history (1820–1859)
