= 1903 in the United States =

- Decades: 1880s; 1890s; 1900s; 1910s; 1920s
- See also: History of the United States (1865–1918); Timeline of United States history (1900–1929); List of years in the United States

Events from the year 1903 in the United States.

== Incumbents ==
=== Federal government ===
- President: Theodore Roosevelt (R-New York)
- Vice President: vacant
- Chief Justice: Melville Fuller (Illinois)
- Speaker of the House of Representatives:

David B. Henderson (R-Iowa) (until March 4)
Joseph Gurney Cannon (R-Illinois) (starting November 9)

- Congress: 57th (until March 4), 58th (starting March 4)

==== State governments ====
Governors and lieutenant governors

=== Governors ===
- Governor of Alabama: William D. Jelks (Democratic)
- Governor of Arkansas: Jeff Davis (Democratic)
- Governor of California: Henry Gage (Republican) (until January 6), George Pardee (Republican) (starting January 6)
- Governor of Colorado: James Bradley Orman (Democratic) (until January 13), James Hamilton Peabody (Republican) (starting January 13)
- Governor of Connecticut: George P. McLean (Republican) (until January 7), Abiram Chamberlain (Republican) (starting January 7)
- Governor of Delaware: John Hunn (Republican)
- Governor of Florida: William Sherman Jennings (Democratic)
- Governor of Georgia: Joseph M. Terrell (Democratic)
- Governor of Idaho: Frank W. Hunt (Democratic) (until January 5), John T. Morrison (Republican) (starting January 5)
- Governor of Illinois: Richard Yates, Jr. (Republican)
- Governor of Indiana: Winfield T. Durbin (Republican)
- Governor of Iowa: Albert B. Cummins (Republican)
- Governor of Kansas: William E. Stanley (Republican) (until January 12), Willis J. Bailey (Republican) (starting January 12)
- Governor of Kentucky: J. C. W. Beckham (Democratic)
- Governor of Louisiana: William Wright Heard (Democratic)
- Governor of Maine: John Fremont Hill (Republican)
- Governor of Maryland: John Walter Smith (Democratic)
- Governor of Massachusetts: Winthrop Murray Crane (Republican) (until January 8), John L. Bates (Republican) (starting January 8)
- Governor of Michigan: Aaron T. Bliss (Republican)
- Governor of Minnesota: Samuel Rinnah Van Sant (Republican)
- Governor of Mississippi: Andrew H. Longino (Democratic)
- Governor of Missouri: Alexander Monroe Dockery (Democratic)
- Governor of Montana: Joseph Toole (Democratic)
- Governor of Nebraska: Ezra P. Savage (Republican) (until January 8), John H. Mickey (Republican) (starting January 8)
- Governor of Nevada: Reinhold Sadler (Silver) (until January 5), John Sparks (Silver) (starting January 5)
- Governor of New Hampshire: Chester B. Jordan (Republican) (until January 1), Nahum J. Bachelder (Republican) (starting January 1)
- Governor of New Jersey: Franklin Murphy (Republican)
- Governor of New York: Benjamin Barker Odell, Jr. (Republican)
- Governor of North Carolina: Charles Brantley Aycock (Democratic)
- Governor of North Dakota: Frank White (Republican)
- Governor of Ohio: George K. Nash (Republican)
- Governor of Oregon: T. T. Geer (Republican) (until January 15), George Chamberlain (Democratic) (starting January 15)
- Governor of Pennsylvania: William A. Stone (Republican) (until January 20), Samuel W. Pennypacker (Republican) (starting January 20)
- Governor of Rhode Island: Charles D. Kimball (Republican) (until January 3), Lucius F. C. Garvin (Democratic) (starting January 3)
- Governor of South Carolina: Miles Benjamin McSweeney (Democratic) (until January 20), Duncan Clinch Heyward (Democratic) (starting January 20)
- Governor of South Dakota: Charles N. Herreid (Republican)
- Governor of Tennessee: Benton McMillin (Democratic) (until January 19), James B. Frazier (Democratic) (starting January 19)
- Governor of Texas: Joseph D. Sayers (Democratic) (until January 20), S. W. T. Lanham (Democratic) (starting January 20)
- Governor of Utah: Heber Manning Wells (Republican)
- Governor of Vermont: John G. McCullough (Republican)
- Governor of Virginia: Andrew Jackson Montague (Democratic)
- Governor of Washington: Henry McBride (Republican)
- Governor of West Virginia: Albert B. White (Republican)
- Governor of Wisconsin: Robert M. La Follette, Sr. (Republican)
- Governor of Wyoming: DeForest Richards (Republican) (until April 28), Fenimore Chatterton (Republican) (starting April 28)

=== Lieutenant governors ===
- Lieutenant Governor of Alabama: vacant (until month and day unknown), Russell M. Cunningham (Democratic) (starting month and day unknown)
- Lieutenant Governor of California: Jacob H. Neff (Republican) (until January 6), Alden Anderson (Republican) (starting January 6)
- Lieutenant Governor of Colorado: David C. Coates (Democratic) (until January 13), Warren A. Haggott (Republican) (starting January 13)
- Lieutenant Governor of Connecticut: Edwin O. Keeler (Republican) (until January 7), Henry Roberts (Republican) (starting January 7)
- Lieutenant Governor of Delaware: Philip L. Cannon (Republican)
- Lieutenant Governor of Idaho: Thomas F. Terrell (Democratic) (until January 5), James M. Stevens (Republican) (starting January 5)
- Lieutenant Governor of Illinois: William Northcott (Republican)
- Lieutenant Governor of Indiana: Newton W. Gilbert (Republican)
- Lieutenant Governor of Iowa: John Herriott (Republican)
- Lieutenant Governor of Kansas: Harry E. Richter (Republican) (until January 12), David J. Hanna (Republican) (starting January 12)
- Lieutenant Governor of Kentucky: vacant (until month and day unknown), William P. Thorne (Democratic) (starting month and day unknown)
- Lieutenant Governor of Louisiana: Albert Estopinal (Democratic)
- Lieutenant Governor of Massachusetts: John L. Bates (Republican) (until January 8), Curtis Guild, Jr. (Republican) (starting January 8)
- Lieutenant Governor of Michigan: Orrin W. Robinson (Republican) (until month and day unknown), Alexander Maitland (Republican) (starting month and day unknown)
- Lieutenant Governor of Minnesota: Lyndon A. Smith (Republican) (until January 5), Ray W. Jones (Republican) (starting January 5)
- Lieutenant Governor of Mississippi: James T. Harrison (Democratic)
- Lieutenant Governor of Missouri: John Adams Lee (Democratic) (until April 25), Thomas Lewis Rubey (Democratic) (starting April 25)
- Lieutenant Governor of Montana: Frank G. Higgins (political party unknown)
- Lieutenant Governor of Nebraska: vacant (until January 8), Edmund G. McGilton (Republican) (starting January 8)
- Lieutenant Governor of Nevada: James R. Judge (political party unknown) (until January 5), Lemuel Allen (political party unknown) (starting January 5)
- Lieutenant Governor of New York: Frank W. Higgins (Republican) (starting January 1)
- Lieutenant Governor of North Carolina: Wilfred D. Turner (Democratic)
- Lieutenant Governor of North Dakota: David Bartlett (Republican)
- Lieutenant Governor of Ohio: Harry L. Gordon (Republican)
- Lieutenant Governor of Pennsylvania: John P. S. Gobin (Republican) (until January 20), William M. Brown (Republican) (starting January 20)
- Lieutenant Governor of Rhode Island: George L. Shepley (Republican) (until January 3), Adelard Archambault (Democratic) (starting January 3)
- Lieutenant Governor of South Carolina: James H. Tillman (Democratic) (until January 20), John Sloan (Democratic) (starting January 20)
- Lieutenant Governor of South Dakota: George W. Snow (Republican)
- Lieutenant Governor of Tennessee: Newton H. White (Democratic) (until month and day unknown), E. T. Seay (Democratic) (starting month and day unknown)
- Lieutenant Governor of Texas: James Browning (Democratic) (until January 20), George D. Neal (Democratic) (starting January 20)
- Lieutenant Governor of Vermont: Zed S. Stanton (Republican)
- Lieutenant Governor of Virginia: Joseph Edward Willard (Democratic)
- Lieutenant Governor of Washington: vacant
- Lieutenant Governor of Wisconsin: vacant (until January 5), James O. Davidson (Republican) (starting January 5)

== Events ==
=== January–March ===
- January 4 – Topsy, a female Asian circus elephant, is killed by electrocution at Luna Park, Coney Island, New York City.
- January 17 – 13 days after Topsy's death, the Edison Manufacturing Company released the short, black-and-white, silent documentary film Electrocuting an Elephant, showing the footage of Topsy's electrocution.
- January 19 – The first west-east transatlantic radio broadcast is made from the United States to England (the first east-west broadcast having been made in December 1901).
- January 21 – Section of Militia Affairs within the Adjutant General's office.
- February 11 – The Oxnard Strike of 1903 becomes the first time in U.S. history that a labor union is formed from members of different races.
- February 14
  - Census Board within the Department of Commerce and Labor (Census Bureau).
  - Department of Commerce and Labor founded
  - United States Coast and Geodetic Survey transferred to the Department of Commerce and Labor.
- February 15 – Morris and Rose Mitchom introduce the first teddy bear in America.
- February 23 – Cuba leases Guantanamo Bay to the United States "in perpetuity".
- March 2 – In New York City, the Martha Washington Hotel, the first hotel exclusively for women, opens.
- March 14 – The Hay–Herrán Treaty, granting the United States the right to build the Panama Canal, is ratified by the United States Senate. The Colombian Senate later rejects the treaty.

=== April–June ===
- May 16 – 8:05pm: Luna Park, Coney Island, New York, opens.
- June 12 – The Sigma Alpha Iota International Music Fraternity is founded at the University of Michigan School of Music.
- June 14 – Heppner Flood of 1903: The town of Heppner, Oregon, is nearly destroyed by a cloudburst that results in a flash flood.

=== July–September ===
- July 1 – U.S. Bureau of Fisheries within the Department of Commerce and Labor.
- July 6–10 – Evansville race riot in Evansville, Indiana.
- July 7 – "Mother" Mary Harris Jones starts a "Children's Crusade" ("March of the Mill Children") from Kensington, Philadelphia to Oyster Bay, New York, the hometown of President Roosevelt, with banners demanding "We want to go to school and not the mines!"
- July 23 – Dr. Ernst Pfenning of Chicago becomes the first owner of a Ford Model A.
- August 9 – Commanding General post replaced by that of Chief of Staff of the Army.
- September–October – A mysterious "visitor" is reported in Van Meter, Iowa.
- September 3 – Los Angeles real estate investor Griffith J. Griffith shoots his wife in the face at the Arcadia Hotel in Santa Monica.
- September 11 – The first stock car event is held at the Milwaukee Mile.
- September 15 – Miami Herald first published as The Miami Evening Record.
- September 27 – The Wreck of the Old 97 engine at Stillhouse Trestle near Danville, Virginia, which kills nine people, inspiring a ballad and song.

=== October–December ===
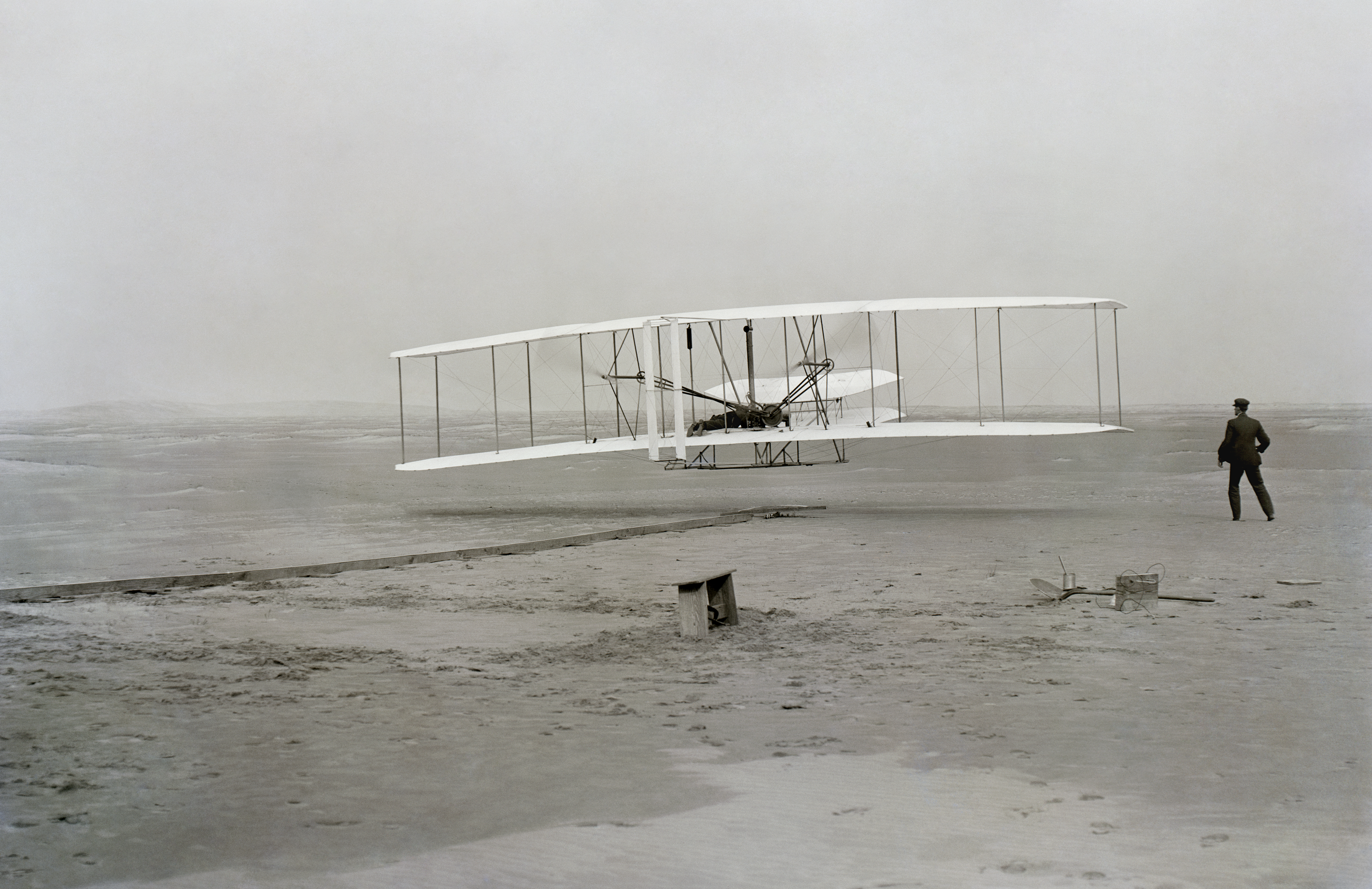
December 17: Wright Flyer.

- October – Frank Nelson Cole proves that 2^{67}-1 is composite by factoring it as 193,707,721 * 761,838,257,287 after trying for every Sunday over three years.
- October 1 – The first modern World Series pits the National League's Pittsburgh against Boston of the American League.
- November 2
  - Maggie L. Walker becomes the first African American woman to charter a bank.
  - Lyceum Theatre (Broadway) opens, making it the oldest continuously operating legitimate theater in New York City.
- November 4 – With the encouragement of the United States, Panama proclaims itself independent from Colombia.
- November 13 – The United States recognizes the independence of Panama.
- November 18 – The Hay–Bunau-Varilla Treaty is signed by the United States and Panama, giving the U.S. exclusive rights over the Panama Canal Zone.
- November 23 – Colorado Governor James Hamilton Peabody sends the state militia into the town of Cripple Creek to break up a miners' strike.
- December 17 – Orville Wright flies an aircraft with a petrol engine at Kitty Hawk, North Carolina, in the first documented, successful, controlled, powered, heavier-than-air flight.
- December 19 – Williamsburg Bridge opens.
- December 30 – A fire at the Iroquois Theater in Chicago kills 600.

=== Undated ===
- The Lincoln–Lee Legion is established to promote the temperance movement and signing of alcohol abstinence pledges by children.
- The first box of Crayola crayons is made and sold for 5 cents. It contains 8 colors; brown, red, orange, yellow, green, blue, violet and black.
- Coca-Cola removes cocaine as a key ingredient from their formula; up to this time, it has contained approximately nine milligrams of cocaine per glass.

=== Ongoing ===
- Progressive Era (1890s–1920s)
- Lochner era (c. 1897–c. 1937)

== Births ==
- January 1 – Dwight Taylor, screenwriter and author (died 1986)
- January 12 – Andrew J. Transue, politician and attorney (died 1995)
- January 17 – Warren Hull, actor (died 1974)
- January 27 – Otto P. Weyland, general (died 1979)
- February 11 – Rex Lease, actor (died 1966)
- February 12 – Lincoln Maazel, singer and actor (died 2009)
- March 4 – William C. Boyd, immunochemist (died 1983)
- March 7 – J. Allen Frear, Jr., United States Senator from Delaware from 1949 till 1961. (died 1993)
- April 19 – Eliot Ness, American Prohibition agent (died 1957)
- May 3 – Bing Crosby, early crooner, singer of the hit, "White Christmas". (died 1977)
- May 6 – Toots Shor, restaurateur (died 1977)
- May 24 – Lofton R. Henderson, naval aviator (died 1942)
- June 12 – Emmett Hardy, jazz musician (died 1925)
- June 22
  - John Dillinger, gangster in the Depression-era United States (died 1934)
  - Ben Pollack, jazz drummer and bandleader (died 1971)
  - Ben Robertson, novelist, journalist, and war correspondent (died 1943)
- June 23 – Frances Dewey Wormser, actress, entertainer and vaudeville performer (died 2008)
- June 25 – Anne Revere, actress (died 1990)
- July 2 – Harwell Hamilton Harris, architect (died 1990)
- July 4 – Walter Trohan, journalist (died 2003)
- July 5 – Edward Woods, actor (died 1983)
- August 7
  - Joseph H. Bottum, United States Senator from South Dakota from 1962 till 1963. (died 1984)
  - Rudolf Ising, cartoon animator (died 1992)
- August 13 – Chubby Johnson, actor (died 1974)
- August 31 – Hugh Harman, cartoon animator (died 1982)
- September 7 – Dorothy Marie Donnelly, poet (died 1994)
- September 9 – Phyllis A. Whitney, mystery writer (died 2008)
- September 27 – Leonard Barr, stand-up comic, actor, and dancer (died 1980)
- September 29 – Ted de Corsia, actor (died 1973)
- September 30 – Lyle Goodhue, chemist, inventor and entomologist (died 1981)
- October 6 – Brien McMahon, United States Senator from Connecticut from 1945 till 1952. (died 1952)
- October 23 – Thaddeus B. Hurd, architect and historian (died 1989)
- October 25
  - Katharine Byron, politician (died 1976)
  - Harry Shoulberg, painter (died 1995)
- October 26 – Bill Allington, baseball player and manager (died 1966)
- November 4 – Robert Emerson, scientist (died 1959)
- November 29 – E. Harold Munn, temperance movement leader and presidential candidate (died 1992)
- December 12 – Dagmar Nordstrom, composer and pianist (died 1976)
- December 28 – Earl Hines, jazz pianist (died 1983)
- December 29 – Clyde McCoy, jazz trumpeter (died 1990)

== Deaths ==
- January 4
  - Gulstan Ropert, missionary (born 1839)
  - Topsy, elephant (born 1875)
- January 28 – John B. Allen, U.S. Senator from Washington from 1889 to 1893 (born 1845)
- February 11 – Rachel Crane Mather, educator (born 1823)
- February 26 – Richard Jordan Gatling, inventor (born 1818)
- March 11 – Lou Graham, wealthy business woman and madame from Germany (born 1857 in Germany)
- March 16 – Roy Bean, justice of the peace (born 1825)
- March 20 – Charles Godfrey Leland, humorist, folklorist and poet (born 1824)
- March 29 – Gustavus Franklin Swift, businessman (born 1839)
- April 22 – Alexander Ramsey, 2nd Governor of Minnesota from 1860 to 1863 and U.S. Senator from Minnesota from 1863 to 1875 (born 1815)
- April 28 – Josiah Willard Gibbs, physical chemist (born 1839)
- April 29 – Stuart Robson, stage actor and comedian (born 1836)
- May 29 – Bruce Price, architect (born 1845)
- July 2 – Ed Delahanty, baseball player (born 1867)
- July 3 – Harriet Lane, acting First Lady of the United States during James Buchanan's presidency (born 1830)
- July 27 – Frederick J. Kimball, civil engineer (born 1844)
- August 1 – Calamity Jane, frontierswoman (born 1852)
- August 28 – Frederick Law Olmsted, landscape architect, journalist, social critic and public administrator (born 1822)
- September 23 – Charles B. Farwell, U.S. Senator from Illinois from 1887 to 1891 (born 1823)
- September 28 – Edward Merritt Hughes, naval officer (b. 1850)
- October 6 – Wilson S. Bissell, politician, United States Postmaster General (born 1847)
- October 20 – Thomas Vincent Welch, politician (born 1850)
- November 3 – Eliza Hendricks, Second Lady of the United States as wife of Thomas A. Hendricks (born 1823)
- November 20 – Tom Horn, gunfighter and outlaw (born 1860)
- December 13 – Alexander McDonald, U.S. Senator from Arkansas from 1868 to 1871 (born 1832)
- December 23 – Middleton P. Barrow, U.S. Senator from Georgia from 1882 to 1883 (born 1839)

== See also ==
- List of American films of 1903
- Timeline of United States history (1900–1929)
