= Edward Renehan =

Edward Renehan may refer to:

- Edward J. Renehan Jr., American writer and musician
- Edward Joseph Renehan Sr., American banker
