= 1822 in the United States =

- Decades: 1800s; 1810s; 1820s; 1830s; 1840s
- See also: History of the United States (1789–1849); Timeline of the history of the United States (1820-1859); List of years in the United States

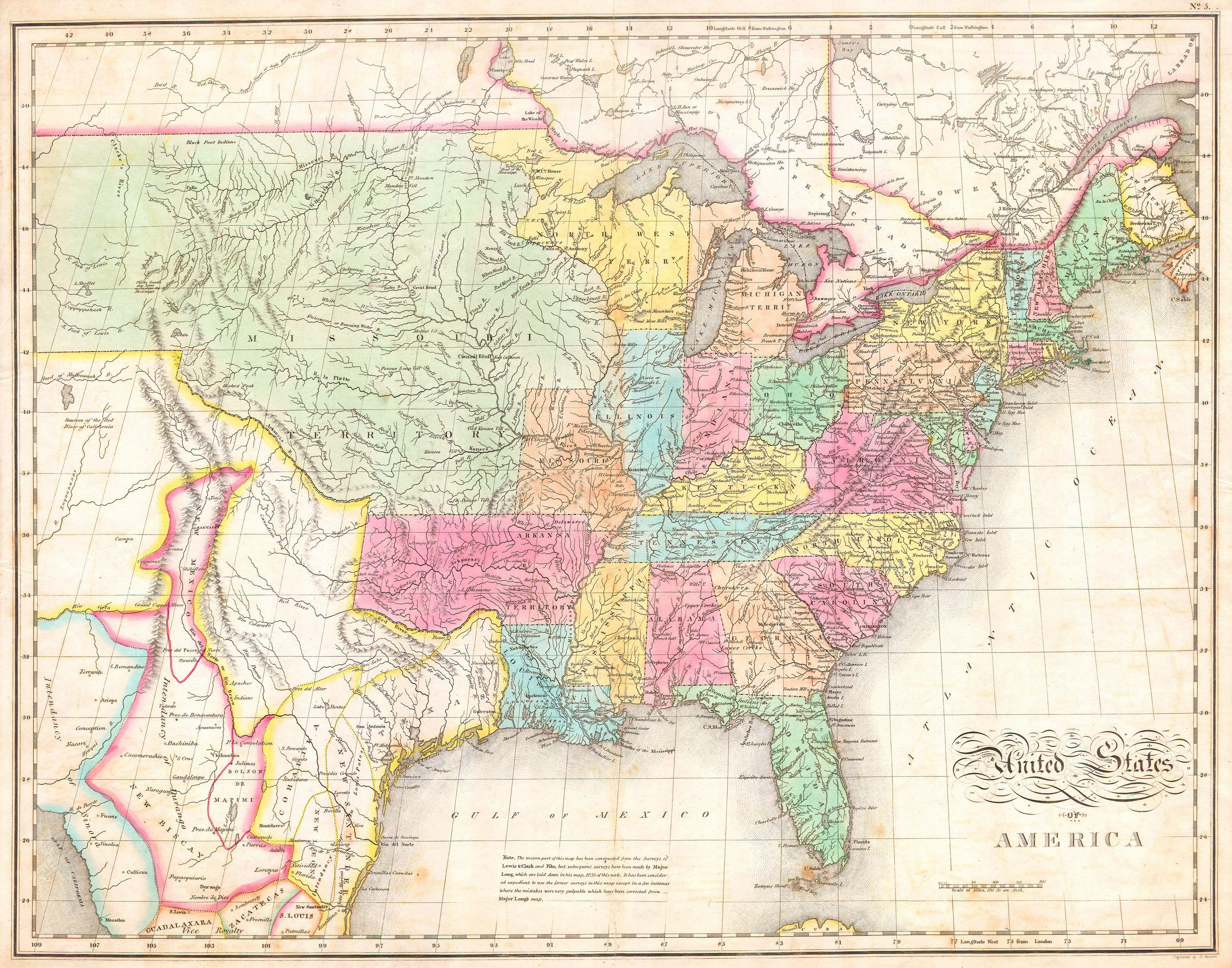
John Melish map of the United States, 1822 (Geographicus Rare Antique Maps)

Events from the year 1822 in the United States.

== Incumbents ==
=== Federal government ===
- President: James Monroe (DR-Virginia)
- Vice President: Daniel D. Tompkins (DR-New York)
- Chief Justice: John Marshall (Virginia)
- Speaker of the House of Representatives: Philip P. Barbour (DR-Virginia)
- Congress: 17th

==== State governments ====
Governors and lieutenant governors

=== Governors ===
- Governor of Alabama: Israel Pickens (Democratic-Republican)
- Governor of Connecticut: Oliver Wolcott Jr. (Toleration)
- Governor of Delaware: John Collins (Democratic-Republican) (until April 16), Caleb Rodney (Federalist) (starting April 16)
- Governor of Georgia: John Clark (Democratic-Republican)
- Governor of Illinois: Shadrach Bond (Independent) (until December 5), Edward Coles (Independent) (starting December 5)
- Governor of Indiana:
  - until September 12: Jonathan Jennings (Democratic-Republican)
  - September 12-December 5: Ratliff Boon (Democratic-Republican)
  - starting December 5: William Hendricks (Democratic-Republican)
- Governor of Kentucky: John Adair (Democratic-Republican)
- Governor of Louisiana: Thomas Bolling Robertson (Democratic-Republican)
- Governor of Maine:
  - until January 2: Benjamin Ames (Democratic-Republican)
  - January 2-5: Daniel Rose (Democratic-Republican)
  - starting January 5: Albion K. Parris (Democratic-Republican)
- Governor of Maryland: Samuel Sprigg (Democratic) (until December 16), Samuel Stevens Jr. (Democratic) (starting December 16)
- Governor of Massachusetts: John Brooks (Federalist)
- Governor of Mississippi: George Poindexter (Democratic-Republican) (until January 7), Walter Leake (Democratic-Republican)
- Governor of Missouri: Alexander McNair (Democratic-Republican)
- Governor of New Hampshire: Samuel Bell (Democratic-Republican)
- Governor of New Jersey: Isaac Halstead Williamson (Federalist)
- Governor of New York: DeWitt Clinton (Democratic-Republican) (until end of December 31)
- Governor of North Carolina: Gabriel Holmes (Democratic-Republican)
- Governor of Ohio:
  - until January 4: Ethan Allen Brown (Democratic-Republican)
  - January 4-December 28: Allen Trimble (Federalist)
  - starting December 28: Jeremiah Morrow (Democratic-Republican)
- Governor of Pennsylvania: Joseph Hiester (Democratic-Republican)
- Governor of Rhode Island: William C. Gibbs (Democratic-Republican)
- Governor of South Carolina: Thomas Bennett Jr. (Democratic-Republican) (until December 1), John Lyde Wilson (Democratic-Republican) (starting December 1)
- Governor of Tennessee: William Carroll (Democratic-Republican)
- Governor of Vermont: Richard Skinner (Democratic-Republican)
- Governor of Virginia: Thomas Mann Randolph Jr. (Democratic-Republican) (until December 1), James Pleasants (Democratic-Republican) (starting December 1)

=== Lieutenant governors ===
- Lieutenant Governor of Connecticut: Jonathan Ingersoll (Democratic-Republican)
- Lieutenant Governor of Illinois: Pierre Menard (Democratic-Republican) (until December 5), Adolphus Hubbard (Democratic-Republican) (starting December 5)
- Lieutenant Governor of Indiana: Ratliff Boon (Democratic-Republican)
- Lieutenant Governor of Kentucky: William T. Barry (political party unknown)
- Lieutenant Governor of Massachusetts: William Phillips Jr. (political party unknown)
- Lieutenant Governor of Mississippi: James Patton (no political party) (until month and day unknown), David Dickson (no political party) (starting month and day unknown)
- Lieutenant Governor of Missouri: William Henry Ashley (Democratic-Republican)
- Lieutenant Governor of New York: John Tayler (Democratic-Republican) (until end of December 31)
- Lieutenant Governor of Rhode Island: Caleb Earle (political party unknown)
- Lieutenant Governor of South Carolina: William Pinckney (Democratic-Republican) (until December 7), Henry Bradley (Democratic-Republican) (starting December 7)
- Lieutenant Governor of Vermont: William Cahoon (Democratic-Republican)

== Events ==
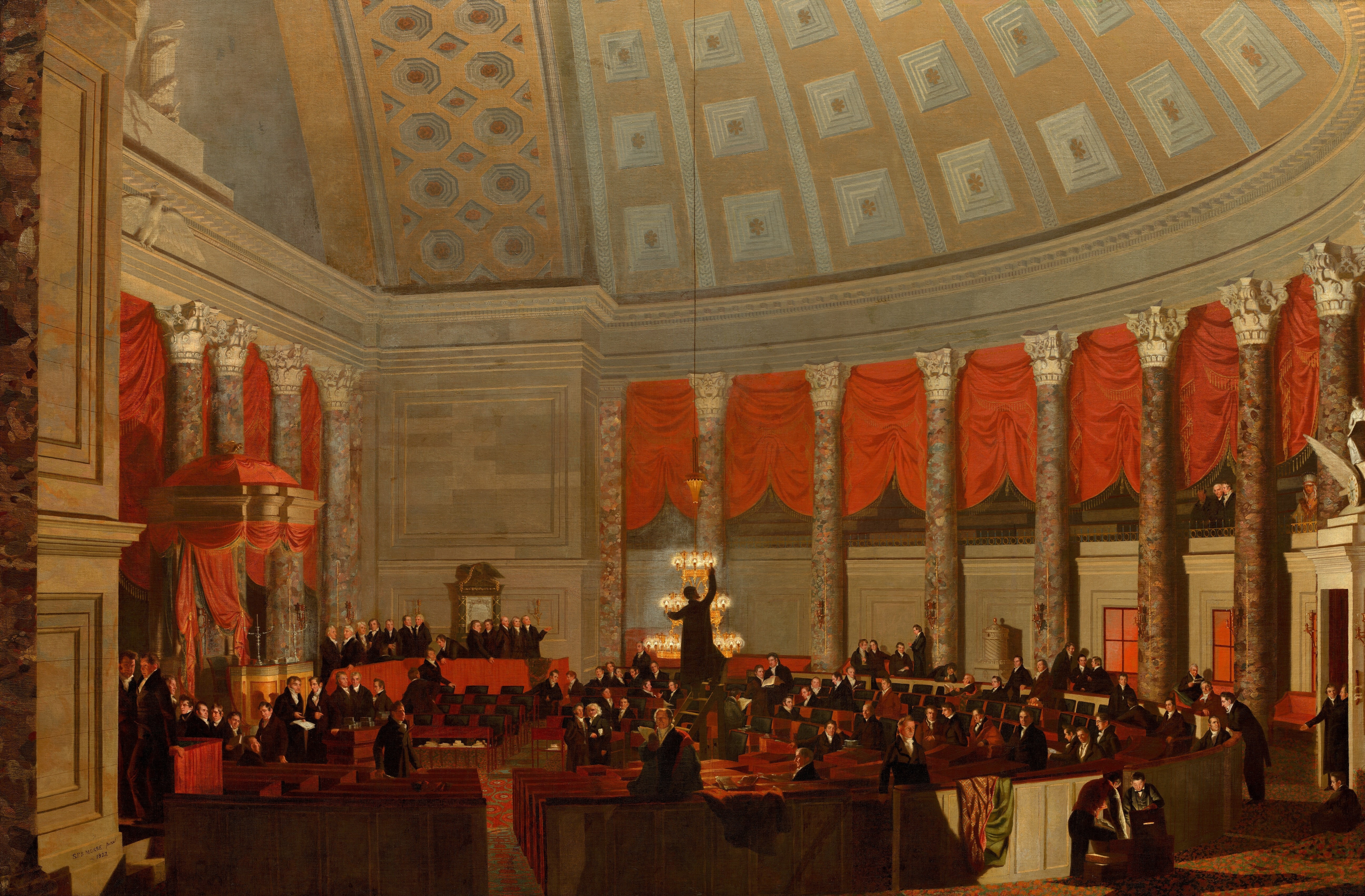
The House of Representatives by Samuel Morse, 1822

- March 30 – The U.S. merges East Florida with part of West Florida to form the Florida Territory.
- July 1–3 – U.S. House of Representatives elections begin in Louisiana and continue until the last elections are held in North Carolina on August 14, 1823.
- July 2 – Denmark Vesey is hanged for plotting a slave rebellion in Charleston, South Carolina.
- July 4 – A 24th star is added to the flag of the United States, representing Missouri which had been admitted on August 10, 1821.
- August 22 – The English ship Orion lands at Yerba Buena, modern-day San Francisco, under the command of William A. Richardson.
- November 9 – Action of 9 November 1822: USS Alligator (1820) engages three pirate schooners off the coast of Cuba as part of the West Indies anti-piracy operations of the U.S.
- November 23 – The USS Alligator wrecks on Carysford Reef off the coast of Florida.
- December 5 – Edward Coles is sworn in as the second governor of Illinois, replacing Shadrach Bond.

=== Undated ===
- Ashley's Hundred leave from St. Louis, setting off a major increase in fur trade.
- A committee is formed to collect remains from the remote location where the Battle of Minisink had been fought in 1779.
- The last major outbreak of yellow fever in New York City occurs.
- Gist Mansion is built in Wellsburg, West Virginia (used some 100 years later for the Brooke Hills Spooktacular).

=== Ongoing ===
- Era of Good Feelings (1817–1825)

== Births ==
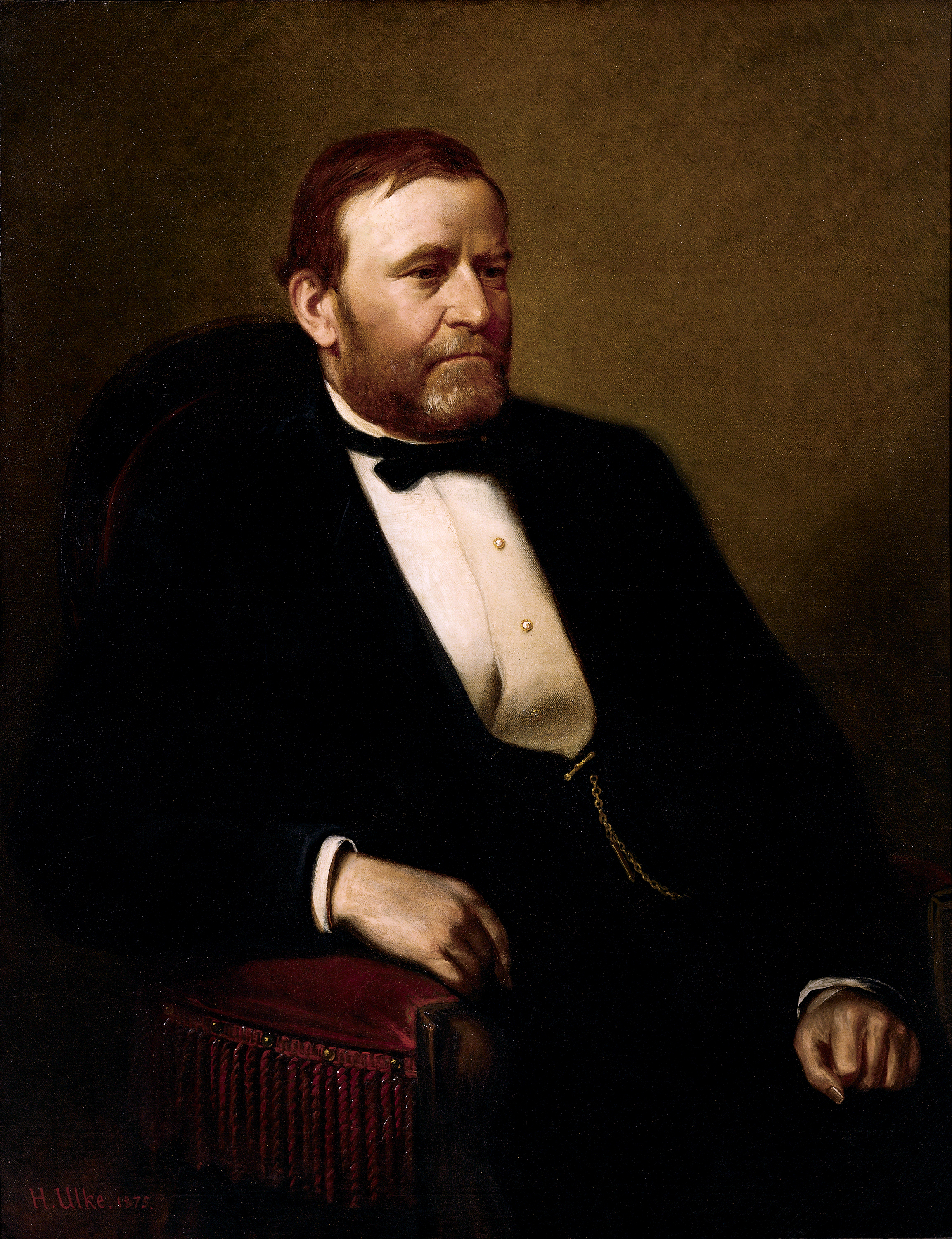
Ulysses S. Grant, 18th president of the United States (1869–1877)

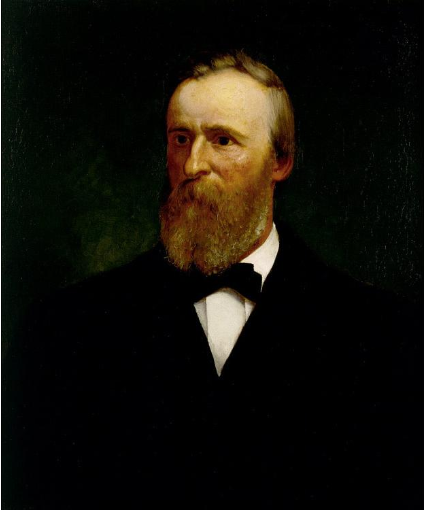
Rutherford B. Hayes, 19th president of the United States (1877–1881)

Two U.S. presidents were born in the year 1822
- February 4 – Edward Fitzgerald Beale, U.S. Navy lieutenant and explorer (died 1893)
- February 13 – James B. Beck, Scottish-born U.S. Senator from Kentucky from 1877 to 1890 (died 1890)
- c. March – Harriet Tubman, born Araminta Ross, African-American abolitionist, humanitarian, and Union spy during the American Civil War (died 1913)
- March 12 – Thomas Buchanan Read, poet and portrait painter (died 1872)
- March 16 – John Pope, career United States Army officer and Union general in the American Civil War (died 1892)
- April 3 – Edward Everett Hale, writer (died 1909)
- April 26 – Frederick Law Olmsted, landscape architect (died 1903)
- April 27 – Ulysses S. Grant, 18th president of the United States from 1869 to 1877 (died 1885)
- May 18 – Mathew B. Brady, pioneer photographer (died 1896)
- June 10 –
  - John Jacob Astor III, businessman (died 1890)
  - Lydia White Shattuck, botanist (died 1889)
- July 21 – Alexander H. Jones, Congressional Representative from North Carolina. (died 1901)
- July 25 – Andrew Bryson, admiral (died 1892)
- August 15
  - James E. Bailey, U.S. Senator from Tennessee from 1877 to 1881 (died 1885)
  - Virginia Eliza Clemm Poe, wife of Edgar Allan Poe (died 1847)
- August 27 – William Hayden English, politician (died 1896)
- September 11 – Francis S. Thayer, merchant and politician (died 1880)
- September 16 – Charles Crocker, financiers (died 1888)
- September 17 – Cornelius Cole, U.S. Senator from California from 1867 to 1873 (died 1924)
- September 19 – Joseph R. West, U.S. Senator from Louisiana from 1871 to 1877 (died 1898)
- September 20 – Elizabeth Smith Miller, women's rights campaigner (died 1911)
- October 4 – Rutherford B. Hayes, 19th president of the United States from 1877 to 1881 (died 1893)
- Undated – Red Cloud (Maȟpíya Lúta), Oglala Lakota chief (died 1909)

== Deaths ==
- April 8 – James Long, U.S. Filibuster, founder of the Long Republic - the first "Republic of Texas". Shot by a prison guard in Mexico City, Mexico (born 1793).
- May 6 – Charles Peale Polk, portrait painter (born 1767)
- May 8 – John Stark, major general in the Continental Army during the American Revolution (born 1728)
- July 2 – Denmark Vesey, African American leader, hanged (born c.1767)
- August 28 – William Logan, U.S. Senator from Kentucky from 1819 to 1820 (born 1776)
- October 31 – Jared Ingersoll, U.S. presidential candidate (born 1749)

== See also ==
- Timeline of United States history (1820–1859)
