= 1896 in the United States =

- Decades: 1870s; 1880s; 1890s; 1900s; 1910s
- See also: History of the United States (1865–1918); Timeline of United States history (1860–1899); List of years in the United States

Events from the year 1896 in the United States.

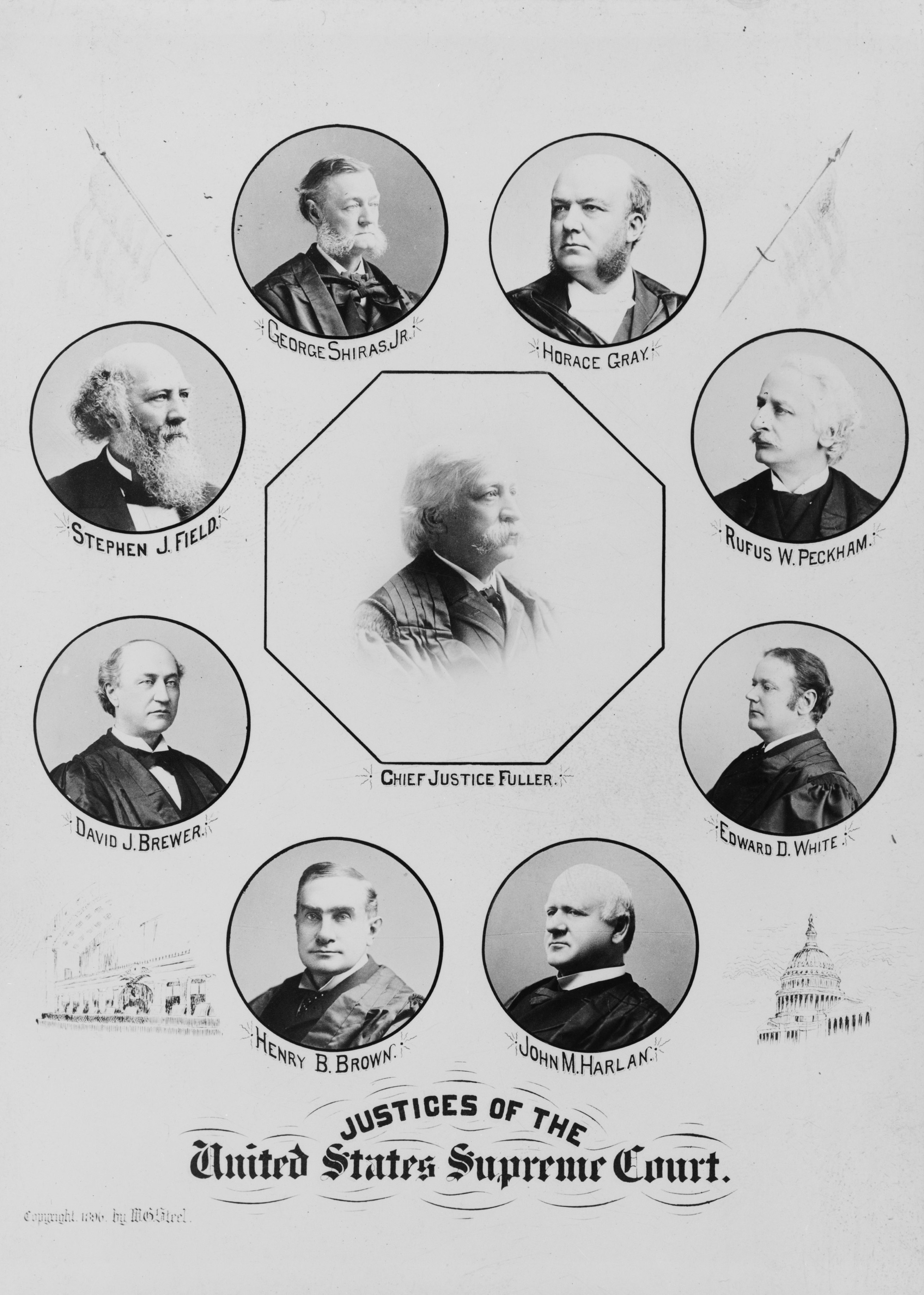
The justices of the U.S. Supreme Court who decided Plessy v. Ferguson.

== Incumbents ==
=== Federal government ===
- President: Grover Cleveland (D-New York)
- Vice President: Adlai E. Stevenson I (D-Illinois)
- Chief Justice: Melville Fuller (Illinois)
- Speaker of the House of Representatives: Thomas Brackett Reed (R-Maine)
- Congress: 54th

==== State governments ====
Governors and lieutenant governors

=== Governors ===
- Governor of Alabama: William C. Oates (Democratic) (until December 1), Joseph F. Johnston (Democratic) (starting December 1)
- Governor of Arkansas: James Paul Clarke (Democratic)
- Governor of California: James Budd (Democratic)
- Governor of Colorado: Albert McIntire (Republican)
- Governor of Connecticut: Owen Vincent Coffin (Republican)
- Governor of Delaware: William T. Watson (Democratic)
- Governor of Florida: Henry L. Mitchell (Democratic)
- Governor of Georgia: William Yates Atkinson (Democratic)
- Governor of Idaho: William J. McConnell (Republican)
- Governor of Illinois: John Peter Altgeld (Democratic)
- Governor of Indiana: Claude Matthews (Democratic)
- Governor of Iowa: Frank D. Jackson (Republican) (until January 16), Francis M. Drake (Republican) (starting January 16)
- Governor of Kansas: Edmund N. Morrill (Republican)
- Governor of Kentucky: William O. Bradley (Republican)
- Governor of Louisiana: Murphy James Foster (Democratic)
- Governor of Maine: Henry B. Cleaves (Republican)
- Governor of Maryland: Frank Brown (Democratic) (until January 8), Lloyd Lowndes Jr. (Republican) (starting January 8)
- Governor of Massachusetts: Frederic T. Greenhalge (Republican) (until March 5), Roger Wolcott (Republican) (starting March 5)
- Governor of Michigan: John T. Rich (Republican)
- Governor of Minnesota: David M. Clough (Republican)
- Governor of Mississippi: John M. Stone (Democratic) (until January 20), Anselm J. McLaurin (Democratic) (starting January 20)
- Governor of Missouri: William Joel Stone (Democratic)
- Governor of Montana: John E. Rickards (Republican)
- Governor of Nebraska: Silas A. Holcomb (Democratic)
- Governor of Nevada: John Edward Jones (Silver) (until April 10), Reinhold Sadler (Silver) (starting April 10)
- Governor of New Hampshire: Charles A. Busiel (Republican)
- Governor of New Jersey: George Theodore Werts (Democratic) (until January 21), John W. Griggs (Republican) (starting January 21)
- Governor of New York: Levi P. Morton (Republican) (until end of December 31)
- Governor of North Carolina: Elias Carr (Democratic)
- Governor of North Dakota: Roger Allin (Republican)
- Governor of Ohio: William McKinley (Republican) (until January 13), Asa S. Bushnell (Republican) (starting January 13)
- Governor of Oregon: William Paine Lord (Republican)
- Governor of Pennsylvania: Daniel H. Hastings (Republican)
- Governor of Rhode Island: Charles W. Lippitt (Republican)
- Governor of South Carolina: John Gary Evans (Democratic)
- Governor of South Dakota: Charles H. Sheldon (Republican)
- Governor of Tennessee: Peter Turney (Democratic)
- Governor of Texas: Charles A. Culberson (Democratic)
- Governor of Utah:
  - until January 4: Caleb Walton West (political party unknown)
  - January 4-6: vacant
  - starting January 6: Heber Manning Wells (Republican)
- Governor of Vermont: Urban A. Woodbury (Republican) (until October 8), Josiah Grout (Republican) (starting October 8)
- Governor of Virginia: Charles Triplett O'Ferrall (Democratic)
- Governor of Washington: John McGraw (Republican)
- Governor of West Virginia: William A. MacCorkle (Democratic)
- Governor of Wisconsin: William H. Upham (Republican)
- Governor of Wyoming: William A. Richards (Republican)

=== Lieutenant governors ===
- Lieutenant Governor of California: William T. Jeter (Democratic)
- Lieutenant Governor of Colorado: Jared L. Brush (Republican)
- Lieutenant Governor of Connecticut: Lorrin A. Cooke (Republican)
- Lieutenant Governor of Idaho: F. J. Mills (Republican)
- Lieutenant Governor of Illinois: Joseph B. Gill (Democratic)
- Lieutenant Governor of Indiana: Mortimer Nye (Democratic)
- Lieutenant Governor of Iowa: Warren S. Dungan (Republican) (until January 16), Matt Parrott (Republican) (starting January 16)
- Lieutenant Governor of Kansas: James A. Troutman (Republican)
- Lieutenant Governor of Kentucky: William J. Worthington (Republican)
- Lieutenant Governor of Louisiana: Robert H. Snyder (Democratic)
- Lieutenant Governor of Massachusetts: Roger Wolcott (Republican) (until month and day unknown), vacant (starting month and day unknown)
- Lieutenant Governor of Michigan: Joseph R. McLaughlin (Republican)
- Lieutenant Governor of Minnesota: Frank A. Day (Republican)
- Lieutenant Governor of Mississippi: M. M. Evans (Democratic) (until month and day unknown), J. H. Jones (Democratic) (starting month and day unknown)
- Lieutenant Governor of Missouri: John B. O'Meara (Democratic)
- Lieutenant Governor of Montana: Alexander Campbell Botkin (Republican)
- Lieutenant Governor of Nebraska: Robert E. Moore (Democratic)
- Lieutenant Governor of Nevada: Reinhold Sadler (Silver) (until April 10), vacant (starting April 10)
- Lieutenant Governor of New York: Charles T. Saxton (Republican) (until end of December 31)
- Lieutenant Governor of North Carolina: Rufus A. Doughton (Democratic)
- Lieutenant Governor of North Dakota: John H. Worst (Republican)
- Lieutenant Governor of Ohio: Andrew L. Harris (Republican) (until January 13), Asa W. Jones (Republican) (starting January 13)
- Lieutenant Governor of Pennsylvania: Walter Lyon (Republican)
- Lieutenant Governor of Rhode Island: Edwin Allen (Republican)
- Lieutenant Governor of South Carolina: Washington H. Timmerman (Democratic)
- Lieutenant Governor of South Dakota: Charles N. Herreid (Republican)
- Lieutenant Governor of Tennessee: Ernest Pillow (Democratic)
- Lieutenant Governor of Texas: George Taylor Jester (Democratic)
- Lieutenant Governor of Vermont: Zophar M. Mansur (Republican) (until October 8), Nelson W. Fisk (Republican) (starting October 8)
- Lieutenant Governor of Virginia: Robert Craig Kent (Democratic)
- Lieutenant Governor of Washington: F. H. Luce (Republican)
- Lieutenant Governor of Wisconsin: Emil Baensch (Republican)

== Events ==
=== January–March ===
- January 4 – Utah is admitted as the 45th U.S. state (see History of Utah).
- February 6–August 12 – Yaqui Uprising in Arizona and Mexico.
- March 23 – The New York State Legislature passes the Raines Law, restricting Sunday alcoholic beverage sales to hotels.

=== April–June ===
- April 9 – The National Farm School (later Delaware Valley College) is chartered in Doylestown, Pennsylvania.
- May 18 – Plessy v. Ferguson: The U.S. Supreme Court introduces the "separate but equal" doctrine and upholds racial segregation.
- May 26 – Eleven years after its foundation, a group of 12 purely industrial stocks are chosen to form the Dow Jones Industrial Average. The index is composed entirely of industrial shares for the first time.
- May 26 – Campbell Axe Murders - James Dunham murders his wife, her family and two of their servants at their family farm in Campbell, California.
- May 27 – 1896 St. Louis–East St. Louis tornado: The costliest and third deadliest tornado in U.S. history levels a mile wide swath of downtown St. Louis, Missouri, incurring over $10,000,000 in damages at contemporaneous prices, killing more than 255 and injuring over 1,000 people.
- June 4 – The Ford Quadricycle, the first Ford vehicle ever developed, is completed, eventually leading Henry Ford to build the empire that "put America on wheels".
- June 28 – Twin Shaft Disaster: An explosion in the Newton Coal Company's Twin Shaft Mine in Pittston City, Pennsylvania results in a massive cave-in that kills 58 coal miners.

=== July–September ===
- July 9 – William Jennings Bryan delivers his Cross of Gold speech at the Democratic National Convention, which nominates him for President of the United States.
- July 30 – Shortly after 6:30 pm, at a crossing just west of Atlantic City, New Jersey, two trains collide, crushing five loaded passenger coaches, killing 50 and seriously injuring approximately 60, in the 1896 Atlantic City rail crash.
- August 9 – Joseph F. Johnston is elected the 30th governor of Alabama defeating Albert Taylor Goodwyn.
- September 15 – The Crash at Crush train wreck stunt is held in Texas.

=== October–December ===
- October 16 – The design of the flag of Knoxville, Tennessee is officially approved by the Knoxville City Council.
- October 30 – Augusta, Kentucky: The Augusta High School cornerstone is laid, marking the end of the Augusta Methodist College.
- November 3 – 1896 United States presidential election: Republican William McKinley defeats Democratic and Populist candidate William Jennings Bryan. This is later regarded as a realigning election, starting the Fourth Party System in which Republicans dominate politics until 1913.
- November 30 – The St. Augustine Monster, a large carcass later postulated to be the remains of a gigantic octopus, is found washed ashore near St. Augustine, Florida.
- December 1 – Joseph F. Johnston is sworn in as the 30th governor of Alabama replacing William C. Oates.
- December 7 – The 54th United States Congress began its second session.
- December 25 – John Philip Sousa composes his magnum opus, the "Stars and Stripes Forever".

=== Undated ===
- The New York Telephone Company is formed.
- Sperry & Hutchinson begin offering S&H Green Stamps to U.S. retailers.

=== Ongoing ===
- Gilded Age (1869–c. 1896)
- Gay Nineties (1890–1899)
- Progressive Era (1890s–1920s)

== Births ==
- January 4 – Everett Dirksen, U.S. Senator from Illinois from 1951 to 1969 (died 1969)
- January 8 – Arthur Ford, psychic, founded the Spiritual Frontiers Fellowship (died 1971)
- January 14 – John Dos Passos, novelist (died 1970)
- January 18 – C. M. Eddy, Jr., author (died 1967)
- January 20 – George Burns, actor and singer (died 1996)
- January 21 – J. Carrol Naish, actor (died 1973)
- January 31
  - Olive Carey, actress (died 1988)
  - Lewis Strauss, chair of the United States Atomic Energy Commission (died 1974)
- February 7 – Bonner Fellers, United States Army general (died 1973)
- February 21 – Homa J. Porter, Texas businessman and political activist (died 1986)
- February 25 – John Little McClellan, U.S. Senator from Arkansas from 1943 to 1977 (died 1977)
- February 28 – Philip Showalter Hench, physician, recipient of the Nobel Prize in Physiology or Medicine in 1950 (died 1965)
- February 29 – William A. Wellman, film director (died 1975)
- March 1 – Harry Winston, diamond dealer (died 1978)
- March 23 – Edwin Eugene Aldrin, aviator and army colonel (died 1974)
- April 8 – Yip Harburg, lyricist (died 1981)
- April 21 – Ralph Hungerford, 33rd Governor of American Samoa (died 1977)
- April 26 – Edward John Thye, 26th Governor of Minnesota from 1943 to 1947 and U.S. Senator from Minnesota from 1947 to 1959 (died 1969)
- May 30 – Howard Hawks, film director (died 1977)
- June 7
  - Douglas Campbell, World War I flying ace (died 1990)
  - Robert S. Mulliken, physicist, recipient of the Nobel Prize in Chemistry in 1966 (died 1986)
- June 19 – Bessie Wallis Warfield, later Duchess of Windsor, socialite (died 1986 in France)
- June 28 – Constance Binney, American actress (died 1989)
- July 8 – James B. Wilson, American footballer (died 1986)
- July 9
  - Thomas Barlow, basketball player (died 1983)
  - Cullen Landis, film actor and director (died 1975)
- July 15 – Gladys Edgerly Bates, sculptor (died 2003)
- July 18
  - Patrick O'Boyle, prelate (died 1987)
  - Thelma Payne, diver (died 1988)
- July 19
  - Percy Spencer, inventor of the microwave oven (died 1969)
  - Stafford L. Warren, physician and radiologist, inventor of the mammogram (died 1981)
- July 21
  - Bourke B. Hickenlooper, U.S. Senator from Iowa from 1945 to 1969 (died 1971)
  - Gladys Hulette, actress (died 1991)
- July 28 – Barbara La Marr, born Reatha Dale Watson, silent film actress (died 1926)
- August 15 – Paul Outerbridge, photographer (died 1958)
- August 22 – W. E. Lawrence, actor (died 1947)
- August 26 – Besse Cooper, supercentenarian (died 2012)
- September 8 – Howard Dietz, lyricist (died 1983)
- September 10 – Adele Astaire, dancer and singer (died 1981)
- September 15 – Robert B. McClure, general (died 1973)
- September 21 – Walter Breuning, supercentenarian; last known surviving male born in 1896 (died 2011)
- September 24 – F. Scott Fitzgerald, author known for the novel The Great Gatsby (died 1940)
- September 29 – George H. Bender, U.S. Senator from Ohio from 1954 to 1957 (died 1961)
- October 22 – Earle C. Clements, U.S. Senator from Kentucky from 1950 to 1957 (died 1985)
- October 30 – Ruth Gordon, actress and screenwriter (died 1985)
- November 8 – Bucky Harris, baseball player (died 1977)
- November 14 – Mamie Eisenhower, née Doud, First Lady of the United States as wife of Dwight D. Eisenhower (died 1979)
- November 16 – Jim Jordan, actor (died 1988)
- November 25
  - Priscilla Dean, silent film actress (died 1987)
  - Jessie Royce Landis, actress (died 1972)
  - Virgil Thomson, composer (died 1989)
- December 6 – Ira Gershwin, lyricist (died 1983)
- December 17 – Robert Francis Anthony Studds, admiral and engineer, fourth Director of the United States Coast and Geodetic Survey (died 1962)
- December 21 – Leroy Robertson, composer and educator (died 1971)
- Date unknown
  - John E. Yunker, North Dakota public servant and politician (died 1968)

== Deaths ==
- January 6 – Thomas W. Knox, author and journalist (born 1835)
- January 11 – George G. Wright, U.S. Senator from Iowa from 1871 to 1877 (born 1820)
- January 15 – Mathew B. Brady, pioneering photographer (born 1822)
- January 19 – Bernhard Gillam, political cartoonist (born 1856)
- February 7 – William Hayden English, politician (born 1822)
- February 22 – George D. Robinson, lawyer and politician, 34th Governor of Massachusetts (born 1834)
- February 23 – George Davis, Confederate States Senator from North Carolina, 4th and last Confederate States Attorney General (born 1820)
- February 25 – Joseph P. Fyffe, admiral (born 1832)
- March 19 – R. Edward Earll, ichthyologist and museum curator (b. 1853)
- April 9 – Gustav Koerner, statesman (born 1809 in Frankfurt)
- April 19 – Arthur I. Boreman, U.S. Senator from West Virginia from 1869 to 1875 (born 1823)
- May 5 – Jacob Fjelde, sculptor (born 1855 in Norway)
- May 7 – Herman Webster Mudgett, alias H. H. Holmes, serial killer, executed (born 1861)
- May 11 – Henry Cuyler Bunner, novelist and poet (born 1855)
- May 13 – Nora Perry, poet, journalist and children's author (born 1831)
- May 31 – Homer V. M. Miller, U.S. Senator in Georgia from 1871 (born 1814)
- June 2 – Ozora P. Stearns, U.S. Senator from Minnesota in 1871 (born 1831)
- June 4 – Austin Corbin, president of Long Island Rail Road (born 1827)
- June 12 – Thomas P. Leathers, steamboat captain (born 1816)
- June 13 – Alpheus Felch, 5th Governor of Michigan from 1846 till 1847 and U.S. Senator from Michigan from 1847 to 1853 (born 1804)
- June 25 – Lyman Trumbull, U.S. Senator from Illinois from 1855 to 1873 (born 1813)
- July 1 – Harriet Beecher Stowe, abolitionist and author best known for the novel Uncle Tom's Cabin (born 1811)
- July 14 – Luther Whiting Mason, music educator (born 1818)
- July 19 – Abraham H. Cannon, Mormon apostle (born 1859)
- July 22 – George Wallace Jones, U.S. Senator from Iowa from 1848 till 1859 (born 1804)
- August 9 – Alonzo J. Edgerton, U.S. Senator from Minnesota in 1881 (born 1827)
- August 14 – Olin Levi Warner, sculptor (born 1844)
- August 17 – Mary Abigail Dodge (Gail Hamilton), essayist (born 1833)
- October 13 – Thomas W. Ferry, U.S. Senator from Michigan from 1871 till 1883 (born 1827)
- October 23 – Columbus Delano, statesman (born 1809)
- November 22 – George Washington Gale Ferris Jr., inventor of the Ferris wheel, typhoid (born 1859)
- Date unknown – Asahel C. Beckwith, U.S. Senator from Wyoming in 1893 (born 1827)

== See also ==
- List of American films of the 1890s
- Timeline of United States history (1860–1899)
