= Technical College of the Lowcountry =

College in Beaufort, South Carolina, U.S.

- Type: Public community college
- Established: 1868 (as Mather School)
- Parent institution: South Carolina Technical College System
- President: Laurie A. Boeding, Ed.D.
- Students: 2,196
- Location: Beaufort, South Carolina, United States; 32°26′11″N 80°40′9″W
- Campus: Beaufort Mather Campus Colleton Campus (Walterboro) Culinary Institute of the South (Bluffton) New River Campus (Bluffton) Hampton Campus (Varnville) MCRD Parris Island MCAS Beaufort
- Colors: Teal, Orange
- Nickname: Tides
- Mascot: King Tide
- Website: www.tcl.edu

The Technical College of the Lowcountry (TCL) is a public community college in Beaufort, South Carolina, United States, that serves the Lowcountry region of South Carolina.

== Campuses ==
The main campus is located in Beaufort along Ribaut Road. Additional facilities are in the New River area (between Bluffton and Hardeeville), Hampton, Parris Island, and at the Marine Corps Air Station in Beaufort. The college offers 75 programs of study.

== History ==
TCL traces its roots to the private Mather School, established in 1868 by Rachel Crane Mather to provide education for children of newly freed slaves in Beaufort County, South Carolina. In 1967, the trustees of the school voted to transfer operations of the school to the State of South Carolina, which had been aggressively building up a statewide technical college system. The school was renamed the Beaufort Regional Training Center in 1970, then the Beaufort Technical Education Center in 1972, then Beaufort Technical College in 1979. During that time, the institution began to expand to serve populations in Colleton, Hampton, and Jasper counties. TCL achieved its current name in 1988 to better reflect the four-county area to which the institution had grown to serve.

== Student body ==
TCL enrolls approximately 2,600 students, of which approximately 1,600 are considered full-time equivalent students. Nearly one-half of students enrolled are minorities, and 72 percent are female.
