= 1839 in the United States =

- Decades: 1810s; 1820s; 1830s; 1840s; 1850s
- See also: History of the United States (1789–1849); Timeline of United States history (1820–1859); List of years in the United States

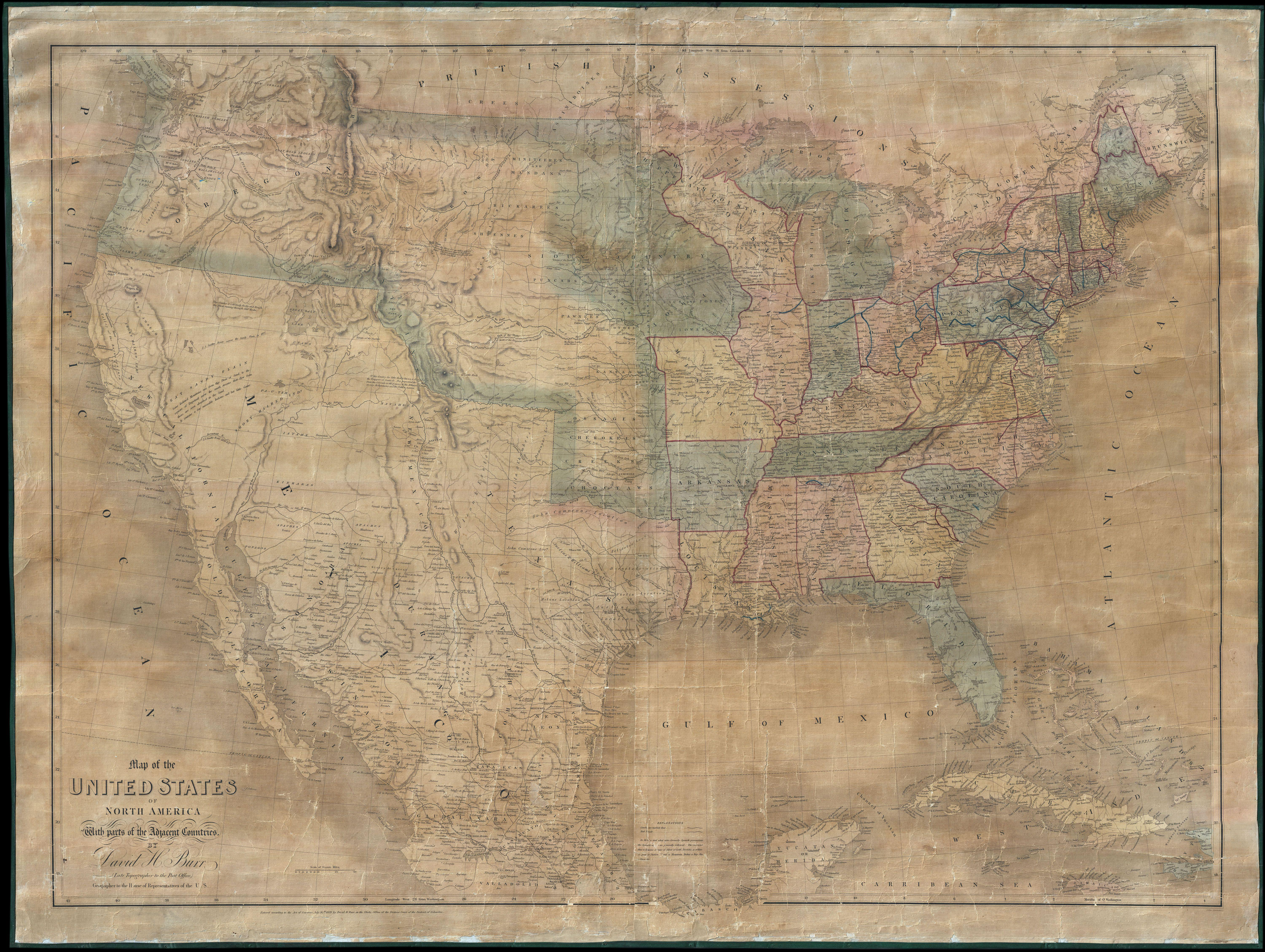
David H. Burr's 1839 map of the United States (Geographicus Antique Maps)

Events from the year 1839 in the United States.

== Incumbents ==
=== Federal government ===
- President: Martin Van Buren (D-New York)
- Vice President: Richard M. Johnson (D-Kentucky)
- Chief Justice: Roger B. Taney (Maryland)
- Speaker of the House of Representatives:

James K. Polk (D-Tennessee) (until March 4)
Robert Mercer Taliaferro Hunter (W-Virginia) (starting December 16)

- Congress: 25th (until March 4), 26th (starting March 4)

==== State governments ====
Governors and lieutenant governors

=== Governors ===
- Governor of Alabama: Arthur P. Bagby (Democratic)
- Governor of Arkansas: James Sevier Conway (Democratic)
- Governor of Connecticut: William W. Ellsworth (Whig)
- Governor of Delaware: Cornelius P. Comegys (Whig)
- Governor of Georgia: George R. Gilmer (Whig) (until November 6), Charles J. McDonald (Democratic) (starting November 6)
- Governor of Illinois: Thomas Carlin (Democratic)
- Governor of Indiana: David Wallace (Whig)
- Governor of Kentucky: James Clark (Whig) (until August 27), Charles A. Wickliffe (Whig) (starting August 27)
- Governor of Louisiana: Edward Douglass White Sr. (Whig) (until February 4), André B. Roman (Whig) (starting February 4)
- Governor of Maine: Edward Kent (Whig) (until January 2), John Fairfield (Democratic) (starting January 2)
- Governor of Maryland: Thomas W. Veazey (Whig) (until January 7), William Grason (Democratic) (starting January 7)
- Governor of Massachusetts: Edward Everett (Whig)
- Governor of Michigan: Stevens T. Mason (Democratic)
- Governor of Mississippi:Alexander G. McNutt (Democratic)
- Governor of Missouri: Lilburn W. Boggs (Democratic)
- Governor of New Hampshire: Isaac Hill (Democratic) (until June 5), John Page (Democratic) (starting June 5)
- Governor of New Jersey: William Pennington (Whig)
- Governor of New York: William H. Seward (Whig) (starting January 1)
- Governor of North Carolina: Edward Bishop Dudley (Whig)
- Governor of Ohio: Wilson Shannon (Democratic)
- Governor of Pennsylvania: Joseph Ritner (Anti-Masonic) (until January 15), David R. Porter (Democratic) (starting January 15)
- Governor of Rhode Island: William Sprague III (Democratic) (until May 2), Samuel Ward King (Rhode Island) (starting May 2)
- Governor of South Carolina: Patrick Noble (Democratic)
- Governor of Tennessee: Newton Cannon (Whig) (until October 14), James K. Polk (Democratic) (starting October 14)
- Governor of Vermont: Silas H. Jennison (Whig)
- Governor of Virginia: David Campbell (Democratic)

=== Lieutenant governors ===
- Lieutenant Governor of Connecticut: Charles Hawley (Whig)
- Lieutenant Governor of Illinois: Stinson Anderson (Democratic)
- Lieutenant Governor of Indiana: David Hillis (Whig)
- Lieutenant Governor of Kentucky: Charles A. Wickliffe (Democratic-Republican) (until August 27), vacant (starting August 27)
- Lieutenant Governor of Massachusetts: George Hull (political party unknown)
- Lieutenant Governor of Missouri: Franklin Cannon (Democratic)
- Lieutenant Governor of New York: Luther Bradish (Democratic) (starting January 1)
- Lieutenant Governor of Rhode Island: Joseph Childs (political party unknown) (until May 2), vacant (starting May 2)
- Lieutenant Governor of South Carolina: Barnabas Kelet Henagan (Democratic)
- Lieutenant Governor of Vermont: David M. Camp (Whig)

== Events ==
- February 11 – The University of Missouri is established in Columbia, Missouri, becoming the first public university west of the Mississippi River.
- March 5 – Longwood University is founded in Farmville, Virginia.
- March 7 – Baltimore City College, the third public high school in the United States, is established in Baltimore, Maryland.
- March 23 – The Boston Morning Post first records the use of "OK".
- August 8 – The Beta Theta Pi fraternity is founded in Oxford, Ohio.
- October – Robert Cornelius takes the first photographic self portrait in the United States.
- October 7 – Much of downtown Mobile, Alabama is destroyed by a wind-fueled fire.
- October 15 – Episcopal High School, Alexandria, Virginia, is founded, the first in the state.
- November 11 – The Virginia Military Institute is founded in Lexington, Virginia.
- November 27 – In Boston, Massachusetts, the American Statistical Association is founded.

=== Undated ===
- The first U.S. state law permitting women to own property is passed in Jackson, Mississippi.

=== Ongoing ===
- Second Seminole War (1835–1842)

== Births ==
- February 9 – Laura Redden Searing, deaf poet and journalist (died 1923)
- March 9 – Phoebe Knapp, hymn writer (d. 1908)
- April 7 – David Baird, Ireland-born U.S. Senator from New Jersey from 1918 to 1919 (died 1927)
- July 8 – John D. Rockefeller, oil industry business magnate and philanthropist (died 1937)
- August 1 – Middleton P. Barrow, U.S. Senator from Georgia from 1882 to 1883 (died 1903)
- August 23 – George Clement Perkins, U.S. Senator from California from 1893 to 1915 (died 1923)
- August 26 – Hernando Money, U.S. Senator from Mississippi from 1897 to 1911 (died 1912)
- September 2 – Henry George, writer, politician and political economist (died 1897)
- September 10 – Charles Sanders Peirce, philosopher, logician, scientist, and founder of pragmatism (died 1912)
- September 13 – Thomas J. Mastin, Confederate captain and lawyer (d. 1861)
- September 18 – William J. McConnell, U.S. Senator from Idaho from 1890 to 1891 (died 1925)
- September 28 – Frances Willard, American educator, temperance reformer and women's suffragist (died 1898)
- September 29 – James Kimbrough Jones, U.S. Senator from Arkansas from 1885 to 1903 (died 1908)
- October 20 – Augustus Octavius Bacon, U.S. Senator from Georgia from 1895 to 1914 (died 1914)
- November 4 – Thomas M. Patterson, Ireland-born U.S. Senator from Colorado from 1901 to 1907 (died 1916)
- December 5 – George Armstrong Custer, U.S. Army Officer and Cavalry Commander from Ohio from 1861 to 1876 (died 1876)
- December 12 – Caroline Ingalls (b. Caroline Lake Quiner), American pioneer, mother of author Laura Ingalls Wilder (died 1924)

== Deaths ==
- January 14 – John Wesley Jarvis, portrait painter (born c.1781 in Great Britain)
- February 26 – Sybil Ludington, heroine of the American Revolutionary War (born 1761)
- March – James Brown, Chickasaw leader and diplomat
- April 1 – Benjamin Pierce, governor of New Hampshire from 1827 to 1828 and from 1829 to 1830, father of the 14th president of the United States, Franklin Pierce (born 1757)
- April 2 – Hezekiah Niles, magazine publisher (born 1777)
- April 5 – John Tipton, U.S. Senator from Indiana from 1832 to 1839 (born 1786)
- April 22 – Samuel Smith, U.S. Senator from Maryland from 1822 to 1833 (born 1752)
- May 11 – Thomas Cooper, political philosopher (born 1759)
- June 10 – Nathaniel Hale Pryor, sergeant in the Lewis and Clark Expedition (born 1772)
- June 22 – Major Ridge, John Ridge, and Elias Boudinot assassinated in what is now Arkansas for their role in negotiating the Treaty of New Echota (born c. 1771, and c. 1802)
- July 16 – The Bowl (Di'wali), Cherokee chief, shot (born c. 1756)
- August 22 – Benjamin Lundy, abolitionist (born 1789)
- September 28 – William Dunlap, actor-manager, dramatist and painter (born 1766)
- December 4 – John Leamy, merchant (born 1757 in Ireland)

== See also ==
- Timeline of United States history (1820–1859)
