= R. Edward Earll =

Ichthyologist

- Born: August 24, 1853; Waukegan, Illinois
- Died: March 19, 1896 (aged 42); Washington, D.C.
- Education: Northwestern University
- Scientific career
- Fields: Ichthyology
- Workplaces: United States Fish Commission, London International Fisheries Exhibition, United States National Museum, Smithsonian Institution

R. Edward Earll (August 24, 1853 – March 19, 1896) was an American ichthyologist and museum curator.

== Biography ==
Earll was born on August 23, 1853, in Waukegan, Lake County, Illinois to Robert Cunningham Earll. In 1877, he graduated from Northwestern University. Subsequently, he began work at the United States Fish Commission as fish culturist—which he retained for only a year—and then became a member of the commission. Beginning from 1879 to 1882 he worked for Tenth United States Census, at which he collected the data and statistics for fisheries in Middle Atlantic, New England, and Southern states. He was a member of Commission for the London International Fisheries Exhibition in 1883. When he returned he was appointed as Chief of the Division for the Fisheries of Fish Commission and received an honorary curator position in the United States National Museum. He spent a good deal of his life working on the expositions for the Smithsonian Institution and National Museum in 1888. He was an editor of the proceedings and of the Bulletin of the Museum, a position that he kept from 1893 to 1896.

== See also ==
- List of Northwestern University alumni
