= Chicago Metallic Corporation =

Chicago Metallic Corporation (founded 1893) is a global provider of architectural building products and service - including metal panels and ceiling system, suspended grid systems, and acoustical and sustainable ceiling panels. The company was noted by the Chicago Tribune as “one of the largest global manufacturers and suppliers of roll-formed ceiling grid, stamped metal decorative ceiling panels and related products”. The company was owned by the Jahn family from 1938 to 2013. On August 19, 2013, the company was acquired by Rockwool International. The acquisition is part of the Rockwool Group's strategy to globalize and develop its ceiling business.

== History ==
In 1893, Chicago Metallic Sash was founded in Chicago, manufacturing zinc sash, which was in the 1900s preferred by architects like Frank Lloyd Wright. Chicago Metallic Sash became the industry leader in zinc sash bar production.

In 1951, DAMPA developed the first perforated metal ceiling in the world. In 1959, the company's name was changed to Chicago Metallic Corporation. In the 1970s, in collaboration with a Danish shipyard, the DAMPA Marine Ceiling Systems were developed, which were the most successful new product launch in the 1970s.

In the 1980s, over a period of 3 years DAMPA developed, in collaboration with Freudenberg, a new acoustic felt (Soundtex) to replace mineral wool. The new felt revolutionized the ceiling industry, and DAMPA was awarded the Danish Environmental Prize.

In the 1990s, a new design concept with acoustic felt in various colours was developed. In 2001, Eurostone ceiling panel production facilities were acquired in Matamoros, Mexico, to strengthen our ability to meet the needs for green building and healthy ceilings.

In 2002, Chicago Metallic manufactured DAMPA Wing, winning the Denmark Innovative Design Award in December. In 2012, CISCA honored Chicago Metallic Corporation with four Construction Excellence Awards. In 2013, Chicago Metallic is acquired by Rockwool International A/S.

== Locations ==
The group operates globally with 3 regional centers:

- CMD, based in Chicago, serves Northern, Central and Southern America market.
- Chicago Metallic Continental N.V., based in Antwerp, Belgium, serves the European and African market.
- Chicago Metallic Far East serves the Asia Pacific, Middle East, Southeast Asia and the India sub-continent regions.
