= Dorothy Marie Donnelly =

Dorothy Marie Donnelly (née Boillotat; September 7, 1903 – May 2, 1994) was a poet and essayist, the author of six books of poetry and prose and numerous articles published in Europe and the United States.

== Biography ==
She was born Dorothy Marie Boillotat in Detroit, raised in Grosse Pointe Park, and resided in Ann Arbor, Michigan. After two years at the Detroit Teachers College (now Wayne State University), she began teaching school at seventeen, and published two articles in the "Detroit Journal of Education (Sept. and Nov. 1921), while still in her teens. She enrolled in the University of Michigan and received B.A. and M.A degrees. She was elected to Phi Beta Kappa and was the recipient of a (major) Hopwood award the first year they were offered.

In 1931, she married Walter Donnelly, of Battle Creek, an earlier Phi Beta Kappa and M.A. at the University of Michigan, who had taught in the Dept. of Rhetoric and recently taken an editorial position with the University of Michigan. They resided at 612 Lawrence Street, Ann Arbor, for the rest of their lives. Dorothy stayed at home writing while raising her three sons: Stephen, Jerome, and Denis. She declined offers to teach for the University of Michigan Dept. of English, preferring to concentrate on her work at home.

Numerous visitors to the Donnelly household, which had become an accidental salon, included poets, professors, and even incipient politicians. A student discussion group on Thomas Aquinas led by Dorothy and Walter, included the future Senator Philip Hart (after whom the Hart Senate Office Building is named). For a time, the mystery writer, Henry Branson, who visited the Donnelly's regularly, lived next door.

Renaissance drama scholar Leo Kirschbaum, another visitor, had an apartment in the adjacent house. When art history professor (later curator of the Smithsonian's Freer Gallery) Richard Ettinghausen learned that the Nazis had wiped out his entire family, it was to 612 Lawrence Street that he sought solace. When, during a fierce thunder storm, Walter and Dorothy invited in a stranger, who had taken refuge on their porch, it turned out to be the young poet Robert Hayden.

Although Dorothy and Walter were not social gadabouts, they were hosts to many serious thinkers. Philosopher/scientist/Dominican priest, Father Raymond Nogar, author of such books as The Wisdom of Evolution and The Lord of the Absurd, would stay at the house whenever he was able to detour from his lecture tours. (Dorothy Donnelly wrote an obituary for him in the Herder Book Supplement [June 1968].) Rev. Edgar Smothers, SJ, a classical scholar working with the university's collection of papyri (Two Readings in Papyrus Bodmer II) spent one Monday evening a month at the Lawrence Street address. Rosamond Haas, a local poet ("Delay is the Song") was also a regular visitor.

There were occasional visits from University museum curators, Jean-Paul Slusser (after whom the Jean Paul Slusser art gallery at the University of Michigan is now named) and Enoch Peterson, the Director of the Kelsey Museum of Archeology. A more frequent visitor was Peter Ruthven, son of the university president Alexander Grant Ruthven. Peter had spent time at the museum's digs in Egypt and later substantial contributions to the university's collection of artifacts.

Less frequent visitors to 612 Lawrence Street were numerous. After giving a campus reading (May 3, 1950), Dylan Thomas chose to spend his evening there, accompanied by Patrick Boland, a close family friend and poet, who came for stays from Detroit twice a year. The British couple, philosophers Peter Geach and Elizabeth Anscombe, became Donnelly friends during their visiting professorships. Rev. Paul Henry, S.J., the Belgian Plotinus scholar, (see for example Plotinus: Volume I, Porphyry on Plotinus, Ennead I), was another sometime guest, who always made a point of detouring from his U.S. speaking trips to stay with Dorothy and Walter.

English poet and critic, John Heath-Stubbs, became a lifelong friend, after he was introduced to the Donnelly household while a visiting professor in the University of Michigan Dept. of English. He always stayed at 612 Lawrence Street on return visits to Ann Arbor. Dorothy contributed "Music from a Grand Piano", an appreciation of Heath-Stubbs in a special issue of Aquarius (London, 1978) in his honor. University of Michigan architecture Professor Joe Lee and his wife, Elsie, were long-standing visitors and close friends, while psychologist Rudolf Arnheim (best known for Toward the Psychology of Art) and his wife became friends and visitors in later years. In addition, at one time or another, other various poets and writers who paid visits included Joe (X.J.) Kennedy, Keith and Rosmarie Waldrop, Donald Hall, and Anne Stevenson.

== Career ==
Before her marriage, Dorothy published in Eugene Jolas's journal transition (Paris), which was also publishing James Joyce, Ernest Hemingway, Franz Kafka, Gertrude Stein, Hart Crane, and Samuel Beckett; it was later to be recognized as one of the most important of the avant garde little magazines. (Jolas wrote to her requesting her to send more of her work, telling her, “You are the only writer in America going in the right direction.”)

The first of her books, the highly praised, The Bone and the Star, described by Mortimer Adler as “a study of primitive man, looked at from the points of view of Christian theology,” adding that “Mrs. Donnelly has that rare ability which can penetrate myths to the truths they contain." Her next book, The Golden Well: An Anatomy of Symbols was published simultaneously in America and England, where the reviewer for the (London) Times Literary Supplement (TLS) called it “remarkable” and “unusually rich”.

Following these publications, she turned to concentrating on poetry. Soon, she had poems published in the most prestigious poetry venues, such as Poetry, The New Yorker, and The Hudson Review. She received the Poetry's Union League Civic and Arts Prize (1954) and Poetry magazine's Harriet Monroe Memorial Prize (1957).

Her first book of poetry, Trio in a Mirror, appeared in 1960, followed by Kudzu and Other Poems (1978) and The Palace of Being (1990). She is anthologized in The New Yorker Book of Poems, Best Poems of 1958, The Hopwood Anthology: Five Decades of American Poetry, New Coasts and Strange Harbors: Discovery Poems, Penguin Poems of Science, and The Various Light: An Anthology of Modern Poetry. Some of her religious essays were collected in the privately printed, Inner Space.

In addition to writing poetry, she wrote many articles and reviews, often in generous response to editors of marginal periodicals, such as Cross and Crown and Pylon (published in Rome). She contributed the Forward to Leaves of Prayer: The Life and Poetry of He Shunangaing, a Farmwife in Eighteenth-Century China, at the request of the translator and friend, Elsie Lee Choi; and at the request of the psychiatrist, Karl Stern (author of Pillar of Fire), she contributed the essay, “Man and his Symbols” to the book he edited, Faith, Reason, and Modern Psychiatry. Similar interests led her to publish “Man and Symbols” in Christianity and Culture. She also published another book of prose, God and the Apple of His Eye (1973) which was described in the forward as "a little book of observations and reflections on God and people and what they have to do with one another." An earlier version of the book according to her son, Jerome Donnelly, was to be titled A Letter to My Sons.

Donnelly's most prized award came in 1976, when she was presented with the gold medal for the Christian Culture Award at Assumption University (Windsor, Canada), joining the ranks of former award winners that included Marshall McLuhan, Dorothy Day, Jacques Maritain, Christopher Dawson, Etienne Gilson, and Allen Tate. The award presentation cited Dorothy Donnelly as “an integral humanist, an outstanding exponent of Christian ideals”.

Reviews of her work have appeared in the Times Literary Supplement (1951), The Irish Times (1951), The Chicago Tribune (1961), The New York Times (1961), and The Michigan Quarterly Review (1961). Commentaries or citations have appeared in Years Work in English Studies (1952), The Ultimate Science Fiction Poetry Guide, The Wikipedia List of Michigan Writers, LSA Magazine, The Michigan Alumnus, The Michigan Daily, and Kirkus.

== Partial bibliography ==
- The Bone and the Star, 1944
- The Golden Well: An Anatomy of Symbols, 1950
- Trio in a Mirror, 1960
- Houses, 1970
- God and the Apple of His Eye, 1973
- Kudzu and other Poems, 1978
- The Palace of Being, 1990
- The New Yorker:
- The Swan, 1953
- Interior: Five O’Clock, 1954
- Serenade, 1956
- Wheels, 1957
- Drawing of a Little Girl by a Little Boy, 1958
- Girandole, 1958
- Snowflakes, 1959
- Leaflight, 1960
- Glass World, 1960
- Blue Flag, 1961
- A Small Thing, 1962
- Poetry Magazine:
- Three Toed Sloth, 1954
- Les Fleurs d’Amour, 1954
- Alexandrina, 1955
- Perennial Landscape, 1955
- Greek Coins, 1955
- For Peter Who Cried Because He Could Not Catch the Moth, 1956
- Charm, 1956
- People, 1957
- Trio in a Mirror, 1959
- Two Figures in a Golden Light, 1960
- Faces, 1962
- Origin of Species, 1963
- To Three Old Ladies, 1963

In addition, she has published in the Hudson Review, Burning Deck, Christian Century, Catholic Art Quarterly, Spectrum, America, Commonweal, National Review, Christian Science Monitor, Blackfriars (England), National Catholic Reporter, Michigan Quarterly Review, Our Family (Saskatchewan, Canada), Modern Poetry Studies, The Critic, The New Republic, and transition.

Other works include: “Man and His Symbols,” Faith, Reason, and Modern Psychiatry, ed. Karl Stern. Foreword, Leaves of Prayer: The Life and Poetry of He Shuangqing, a Farmwife in Eighteenth-Century China, trans. Elsie Choy (1993). “Man and Symbols,” in Christianity and Culture (1961). “Inner Space” (privately printed).

Anthologized poems appear in:

- Best Poems of 1958 (1960);
- The New Yorker Book of Poetry (1969);
- The Hopwood Anthology: Five Decades of American Poetry (1981);
- New Coasts and Strange Harbors: Discovery Poems (1974);
- Penguin Poems of Science (1984);
- The Various Light: An Anthology of Modern Poetry (1964)
- Sources for Synthesis (1955).
