= A. B. plot =

In United States history, the A. B. plot refers to the political enmity in 1823-1824 between Senator Ninian Edwards of Illinois and William H. Crawford, Secretary of the Treasury. Crawford had employed the unstable western banks to collect public land revenues in fluctuating banknote currencies. This policy, though justifiable, resulted in losses to the government, while he undoubtedly used his banking connections to advance his political influence. In 1823 the Washington Republican newspaper, a John C. Calhoun, published a series of articles signed A. B. which attacked Crawford for malfeasance in his relations with certain banks, and accused him of suppressing letters on the subject for which the United States House of Representatives had called. These articles were written by Edwards; while some thought he desired to damage Crawford in the 1824 presidential campaign, John Quincy Adams believed the real object was to remove William Winston Seaton and Joseph Gales, Crawford supporters, from the post of public printers. Early in 1824, while on his way west as the newly appointed Minister to Mexico, Edwards sent formal charges against Crawford to the House. He was at once recalled to testify before an investigating committee of seven, resigning his ministership. The committee report not only exonerated Crawford but also left Edwards's reputation severely blemished.
