= Edward Joseph Renehan Sr. =

American banker (1886–1953)

Edward Joseph Renehan Sr. (1886–1953) was an American banker, a supporter of Irish independence, and a major benefactor of the American Irish Historical Society.

== Biography ==
Renehan was born in 1886. In 1934 he became an officer of the Corn Exchange Bank in New York City. He was brother-in-law to Tammany Hall leader and congressman James H. Torrens and a cousin to the politician, attorney, and actor Dudley Field Malone. Renehan was noted for his many gifts to St. Patrick's College, Maynooth (County Kildare, Ireland) where his great-uncle, the Rev. Dr. Laurence F. Renehan, 1797–1857, had been president in the 1850s. He was also for many years an officer in the Friendly Sons of St. Patrick and the Ancient Order of Hibernians. As a young man, Renehan served as secretary to Irish-American attorney and politician William Bourke Cockran.

He died in 1953.
