= Rachel Crane Mather =

American educator

- Born: Rachel Crane Rich; February 5, 1823; Troy, New Hampshire, US
- Died: February 11, 1903 (aged 79); Deep River, Connecticut
- Occupation: Educator
- Known for: Founding the Mather School
- Spouse(s): Joseph Higgins Mather, Jr.
- Children: Joseph Higgins Mather III, Samuel Webb Mather
- Parent: Ezekiel Rich

Rachel Crane Rich Mather (February 5, 1823 – February 11, 1903) established the Mather School for daughters of freed slaves in 1867 in South Carolina. The school eventually became the Technical College of the Lowcountry.

== Biography ==
Rachel Crane Mather was the sixth of nine children born to Christian missionaries living in New Hampshire in 1823. Her father, Ezekiel Rich, was a Congregational minister. Rachel worked as a teacher in Boston, and in 1846 married a Baptist minister named Joseph Higgins Mather, Jr. in Rhode Island. They had two sons, but a just few years after marrying, her husband and their youngest son Samuel both died.

Mather believed that God wanted her to help freed slaves, and was assigned by the American Missionary Association to teach at a normal school for freed slaves in Beaufort, South Carolina. She was especially heartbroken over the many orphans she saw, whose parents had often been sold or shipped elsewhere, and who were living in the streets with no access to food or education.

After a year of teaching for the AMA, she founded the Mather School of Beaufort, which opened in 1868, during America's Reconstruction Period, with Mather serving as principal. The school provided housing, food, and clothing in addition to education such as reading, grammar, math, housekeeping skills, and "moral development" with a curriculum centered around the Bible. The Mather School was supported financially by the Woman's American Baptist Home Mission Society. It began with a focus on elementary-aged girls, but expanded to middle school, high school, and college as time went on. The school was one of the pioneering schools for teaching former slaves and their children, and provided a "rigorous and character-building experience", according to Dr. Lucy Reuben who attended the school.

The school continued until 1968, at which point it was sold to the state of South Carolina. The school eventually became the Technical College of the Lowcountry.

In 2017, the Mather Interpretive Center, housed in the school's former library, opened in Beaufort to preserve the history of the school and its founder. Greg Rawls, a Beaufort Arts Council member, said regarding the opening: "This is an amazing story that people just don't seem to know about... What we want is for this Beaufort story to be more than just a sign by the road."

Thomas Leitzel, president of the Technical College of the Lowcountry, called Mather a "hero with a vision and commitment to making life better through education."
