= 1903 =

1903 in various calendars
- Gregorian calendar: 1903; MCMIII
- Ab urbe condita: 2656
- Armenian calendar: 1352; ԹՎ ՌՅԾԲ
- Assyrian calendar: 6653
- Baháʼí calendar: 59–60
- Balinese saka calendar: 1824–1825
- Bengali calendar: 1309–1310
- Berber calendar: 2853
- British Regnal year: 2 Edw. 7 – 3 Edw. 7
- Buddhist calendar: 2447
- Burmese calendar: 1265
- Byzantine calendar: 7411–7412
- Chinese calendar: 壬寅年 (Water Tiger); 4600 or 4393 — to — 癸卯年 (Water Rabbit); 4601 or 4394
- Coptic calendar: 1619–1620
- Discordian calendar: 3069
- Ethiopian calendar: 1895–1896
- Hebrew calendar: 5663–5664
- Hindu calendars
- Vikram Samvat: 1959–1960
- Shaka Samvat: 1824–1825
- Kali Yuga: 5003–5004
- Holocene calendar: 11903
- Igbo calendar: 903–904
- Iranian calendar: 1281–1282
- Islamic calendar: 1320–1321
- Japanese calendar: Meiji 36 (明治３６年)
- Javanese calendar: 1832–1833
- Julian calendar: Gregorian minus 13 days
- Korean calendar: 4236
- Minguo calendar: 9 before ROC 民前9年
- Nanakshahi calendar: 435
- Thai solar calendar: 2445–2446
- Tibetan calendar: ཆུ་ཕོ་སྟག་ལོ་ (male Water-Tiger); 2029 or 1648 or 876 — to — ཆུ་མོ་ཡོས་ལོ་ (female Water-Hare); 2030 or 1649 or 877

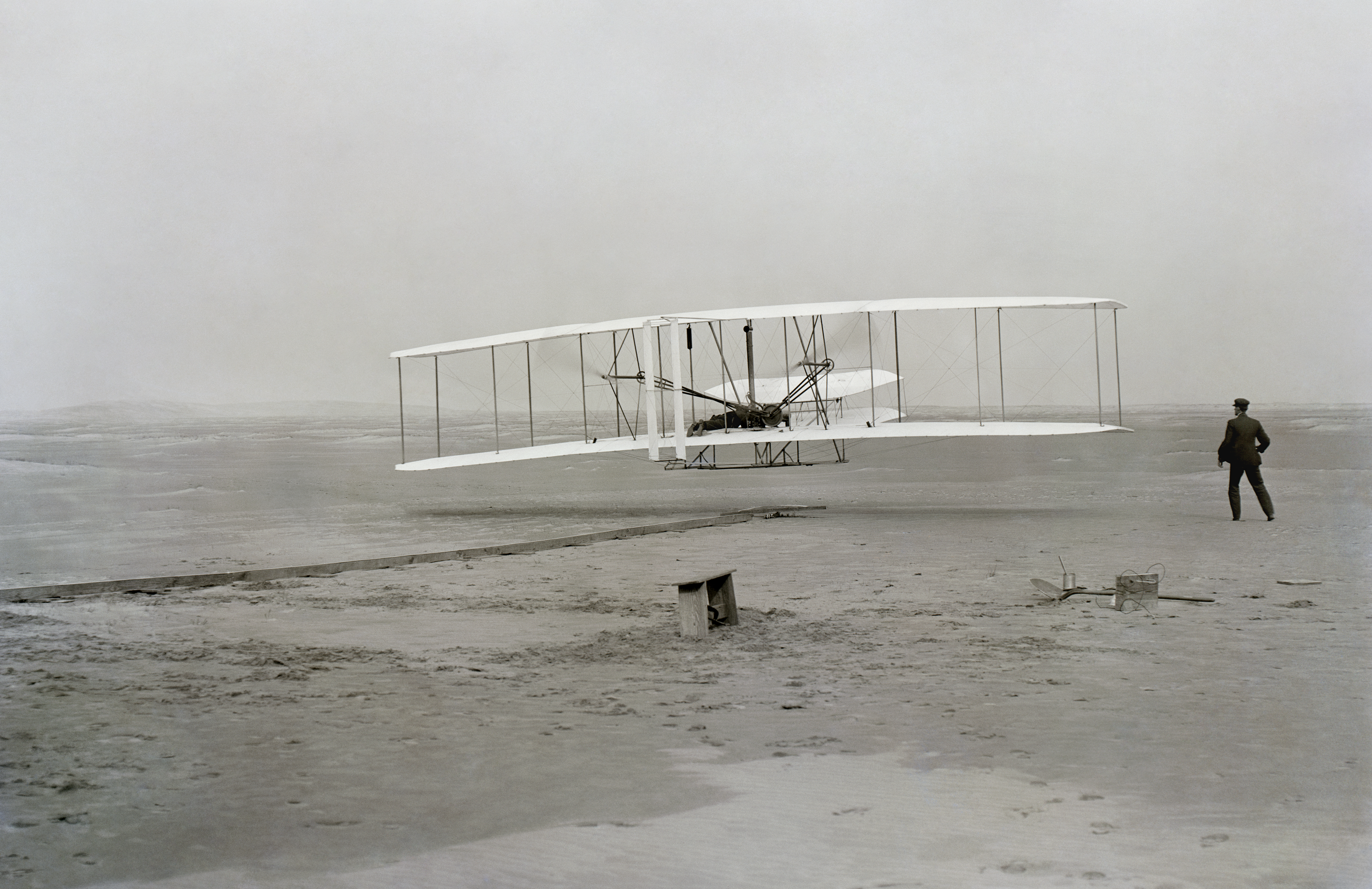
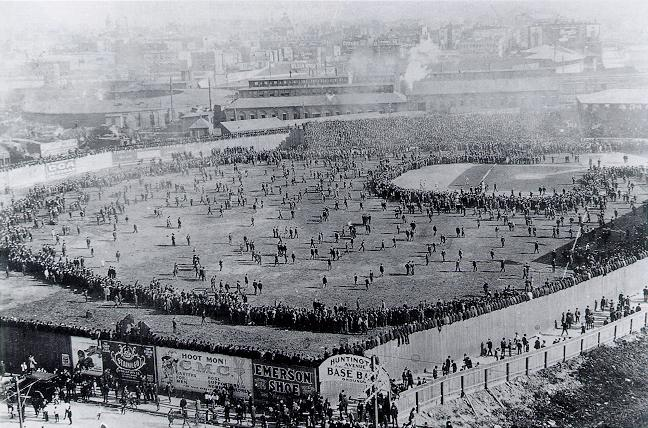
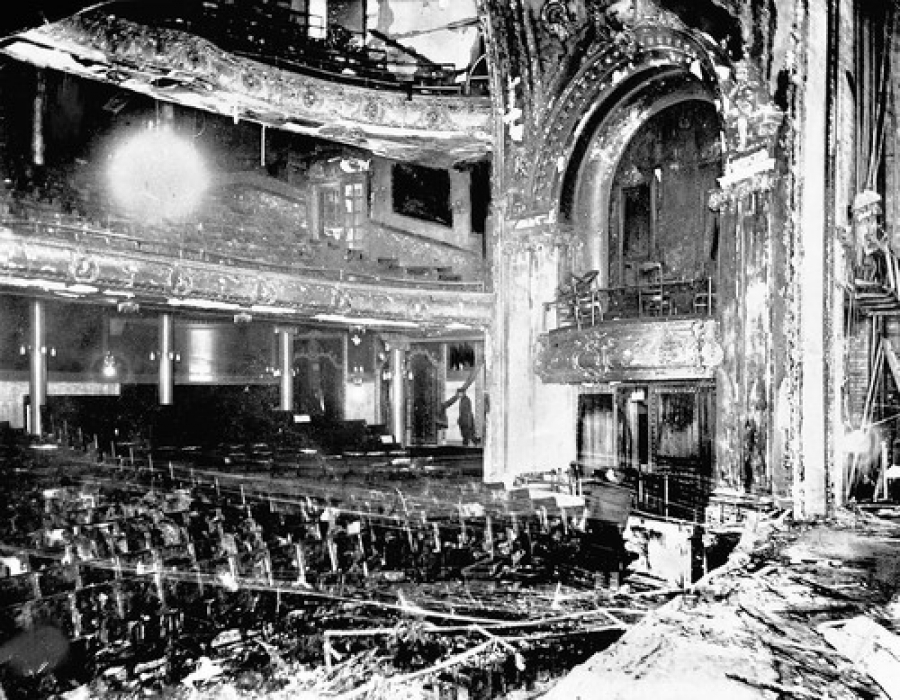
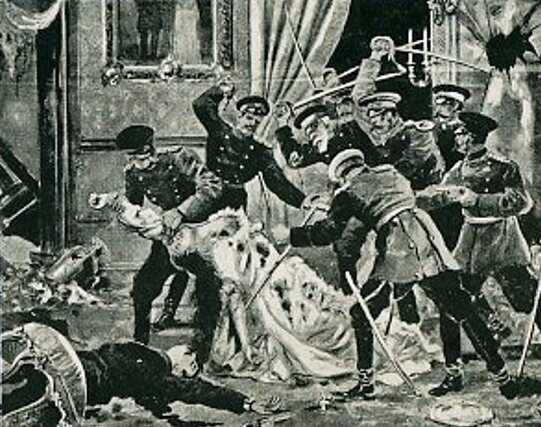
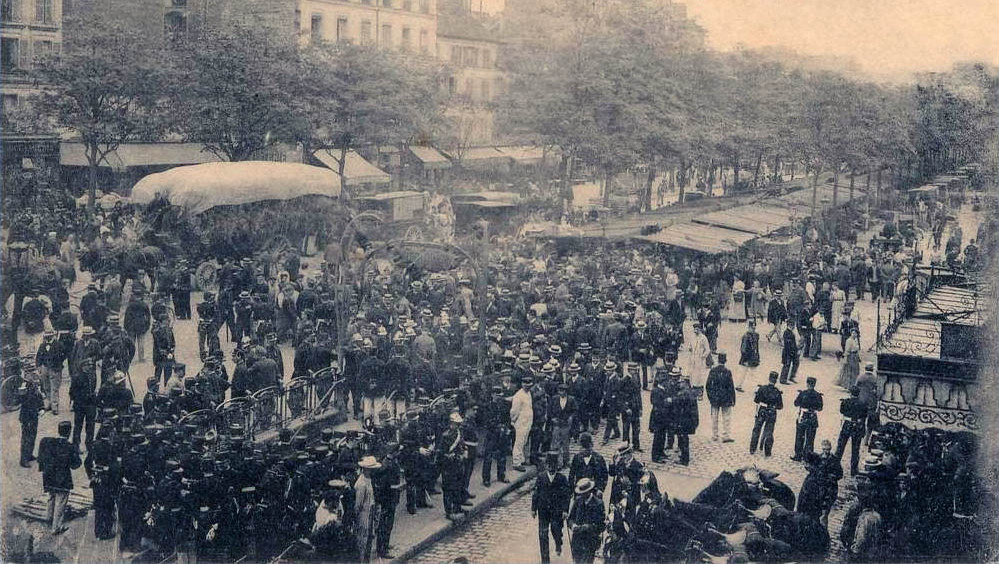
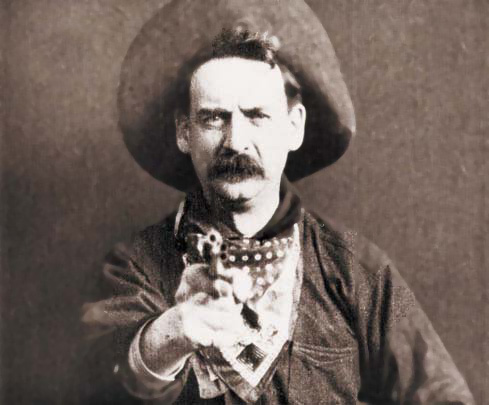
From top to bottom, left to right:
- The Wright Flyer makes the first powered, controlled flight at Kitty Hawk, as the Wright brothers launch the era of aviation;
- The inaugural 1903 World Series sees the Boston Americans defeat the Pittsburgh Pirates, establishing baseball’s championship tradition;
- The Iroquois Theatre fire in Chicago kills over 600, becoming the deadliest U.S. theater fire and driving new safety reforms;
- The May Coup results in the assassination of King Alexander I and Queen Draga, reshaping Balkan politics;
- The Paris Métro train fire claims more than 80 lives, one of France’s worst transit disasters;
- The Great Train Robbery premieres, revolutionizing cinema with innovative storytelling.

1903 (MCMIII) was a common year starting on Thursday of the Gregorian calendar and a common year starting on Wednesday of the Julian calendar, the 1903rd year of the Common Era (CE) and Anno Domini (AD) designations, the 903rd year of the 2nd millennium, the 3rd year of the 20th century, and the 4th year of the 1900s decade. As of the start of 1903, the Gregorian calendar was 13 days ahead of the Julian calendar, which remained in localized use until 1923.

== Events ==
=== January ===
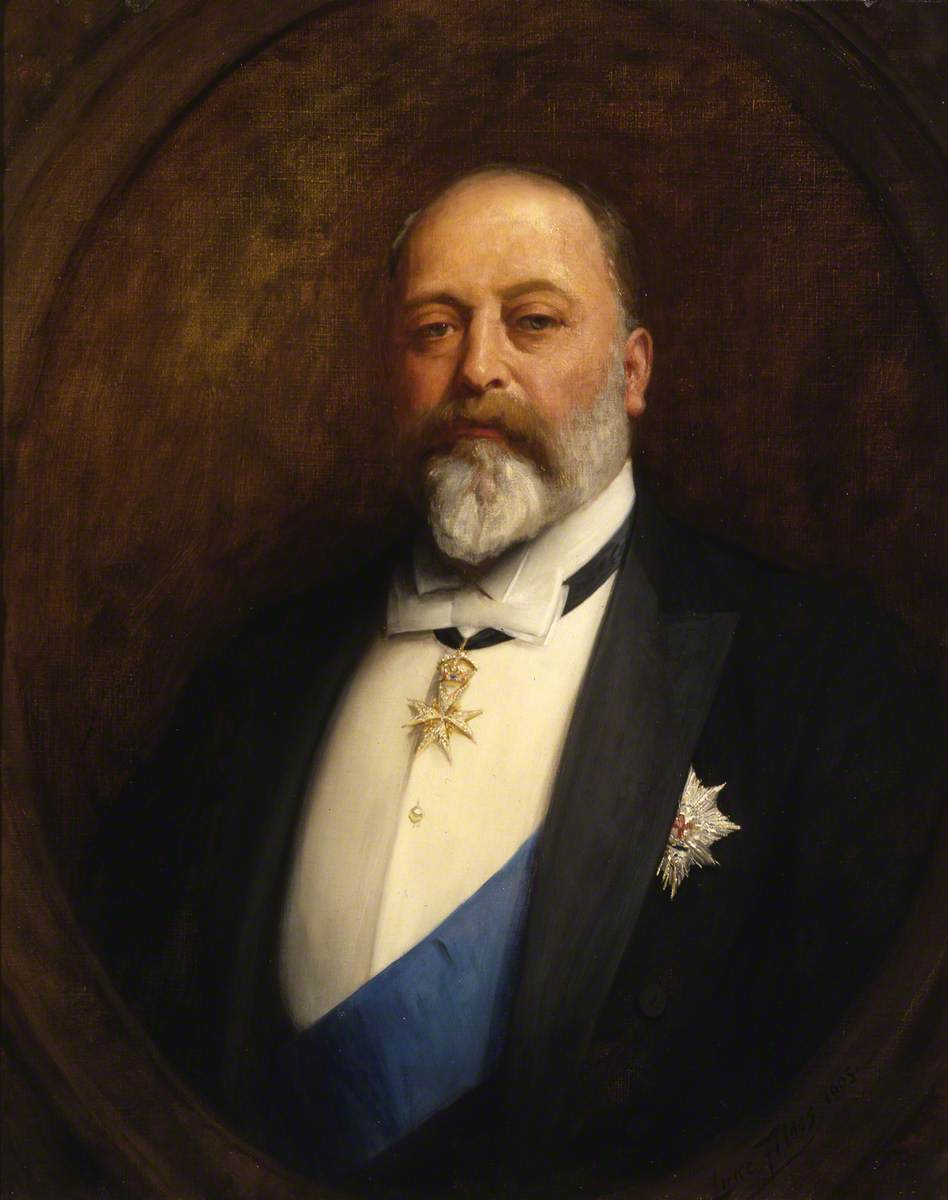
January 1: Edward VII becomes Emperor of India.

- January 1 – Edward VII is proclaimed Emperor of India.
- January 10 – The Aceh Sultanate was fully annexed by Dutch forces, deposing the last sultan, and marking the end of the Aceh War that had lasted almost 30 years.
- January 19 – The first west–east transatlantic radio broadcast is made from the United States to England (the first east–west broadcast having been made in 1901).

=== February ===
- February 13 – Venezuelan crisis: After agreeing to arbitration in Washington, the United Kingdom, Germany and Italy reach a settlement with Venezuela resulting in the Washington Protocols. The naval blockade that began in 1902 ends.
- February 23 – Cuba leases Guantánamo Bay to the United States "in perpetuity".

=== March ===
- March - In Yonkers, New York George A. Ellis, founded and became the first president of the Yonkers Motorcycle Club, the oldest motorcycle club in the world.
- March 2 – In New York City, the Martha Washington Hotel, the first hotel exclusively for women, opens.
- March 3 – The British Admiralty announces plans to build the Rosyth Dockyard as a naval base at Rosyth in Scotland.
- March 5 – The Ottoman Empire and the German Empire sign an agreement to build the Constantinople–Baghdad Railway.
- March 12 – The University of Puerto Rico is founded.
- March 13 – Having abolished the Sokoto Caliphate in West Africa, the new British administration accepts the concession of its last vizier.
- March 14 – The Hay–Herrán Treaty, granting the United States the right to build the Panama Canal, is ratified by the United States Senate. The Colombian senate later rejects the treaty.

=== April ===
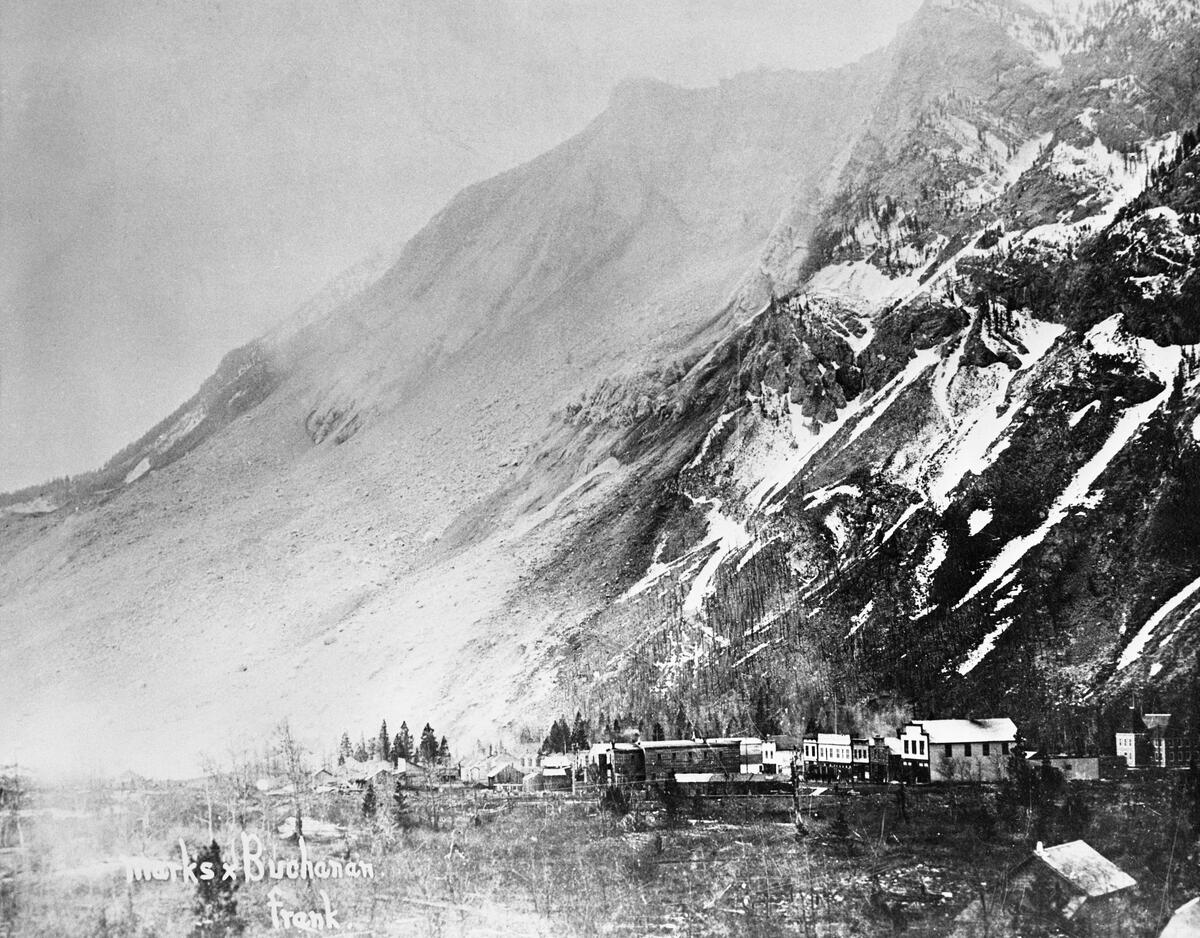
April 29: The Frank Slide occurs

- April 19–21 (April 6–8 O.S.) – The first Kishinev pogrom, beginning on Easter Day, takes place in Kishinev, capital of the Bessarabia Governorate of the Russian Empire. At least 47 Jews are killed during mob rioting encouraged by blood libel articles in the press and led by priests.
- April 26 – Atlético Madrid is founded as a professional association football club in Spain.
- April 29
  - The 30-million-m^{3} Frank Slide rockslide kills 70–90 in Frank, Alberta.
  - The 7.0 M_{s} Manzikert earthquake affects eastern Turkey, leaving 3,500 dead.

=== May ===
- May 4 – Macedonian Bulgarian revolutionary Gotse Delchev is killed in a skirmish with the Ottoman army.
- May 18 – The port of Burgas, Bulgaria opens.
- May 24 – The Paris–Madrid race for automobiles begins, during which at least eight people are killed; the French government stops the event at Bordeaux and impounds all of the competitors' cars.
- May 26 – Românul de la Pind, the longest-running newspaper by and about Aromanians until World War II, is founded.

=== June ===
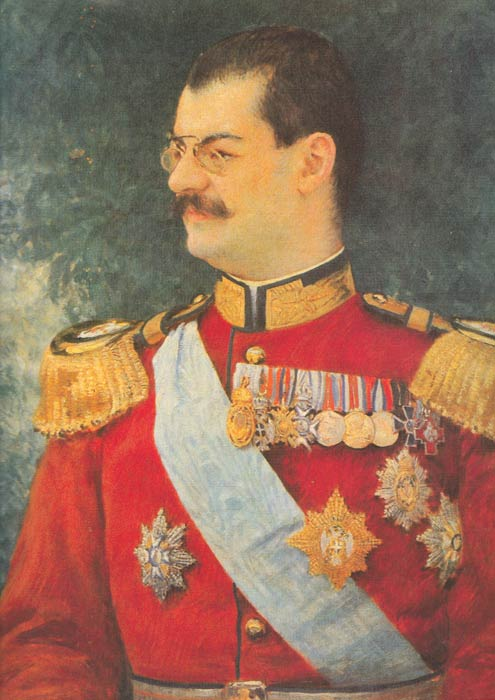
June 11: Alexander I

- June 11 (May 29 O.S.) – King Alexander Obrenović and Queen Draga of Serbia are assassinated in Belgrade by the Black Hand (Crna Ruka) organization.
- June 14 – The town of Heppner, Oregon is nearly destroyed by a cloud burst that results in a flash flood that kills about 238 people.
- June 16 – The Ford Motor Company is founded.
- June 27 – American socialite Aida de Acosta, 19, becomes the first woman to fly a powered aircraft solo when she pilots Santos-Dumont's motorized dirigible, "No. 9", from Paris to Château de Bagatelle in France.

=== July ===
July 23: 1903 Ford Model A.

- July 1–19 – The first Tour de France is held; Maurice Garin wins it.
- July 7 – Britain take over the Fulani Empire.
- July 29 – United States Cartridge Company explosion: The explosion of two explosives storage magazines destroys 70 homes, killing 22 residents of Tewksbury, Massachusetts.
- July 30–August 23 (July 17–August 10, O.S.) – The Second Congress of the All-Russian Social Democratic Labour Party is held in exile in Brussels, transferring to London.

=== August ===
- August 2 – The Ilinden–Preobrazhenie Uprising, organized by the Secret Macedonian-Adrianople Revolutionary Organization, breaks out in the Ottoman provinces of Macedonia and Adrianople.
- August 3 – The Kruševo Republic is proclaimed in Ottoman Macedonia; it is crushed 10 days later.
- August 4 – Pope Pius X succeeds Pope Leo XIII as the 257th pope.
- August 10 – The Paris Métro train fire at Couronnes results in 84 deaths.

=== September ===
- September – Texas State University in San Marcos, Texas opens as Southwest Texas Normal School.
- September 11 – The first stock-car event is held at the Milwaukee Mile.
- September 15 – Grêmio FBPA is founded in Porto Alegre, Brazil.
- September 27 – The Wreck of the Old 97 Fast Mail train at Stillhouse Trestle, near Danville, Virginia, kills 11 people and inspires a ballad.

=== October ===
- October 1–13 – First modern World Series: The Boston Americans defeat the Pittsburgh Pirates in eight games.
- October 10 – The Women's Social and Political Union is founded in the U.K.

=== November ===
- November 3 – Separation of Panama from Colombia: With the encouragement of the United States, Panama proclaims itself independent of Colombia.
- November 6 – The English-language South China Morning Post newspaper is first published in Hong Kong.
- November 13 – The United States recognizes the independence of Panama.
- November 17 – The Russian Social Democratic Labour Party splits into two groups: the Bolsheviks (Russian for "majority") and Mensheviks (Russian for "minority").
- November 18 – The Hay–Bunau-Varilla Treaty is signed by the United States and Panama, giving the U.S. exclusive rights over the Panama Canal Zone.
- November 28 – SS Petriana is wrecked on a reef outside Melbourne, Australia, causing one of the world's first major oil spills.

=== December ===
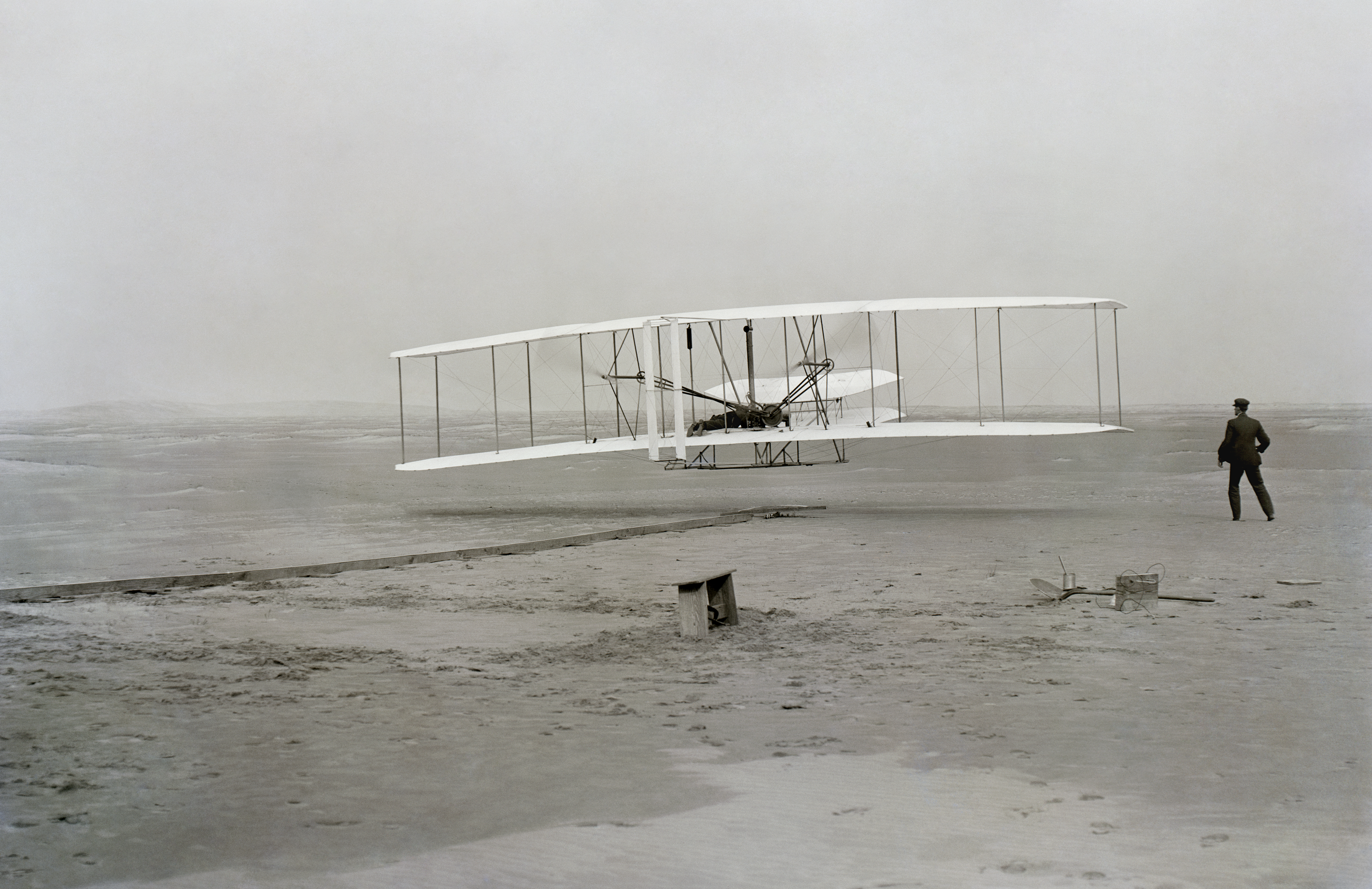
December 17: The Wright Flyer in the air, the first airplane flight, by Orville Wright.

- December 16 – The Taj Mahal Palace Hotel in Bombay (now Mumbai), India opens.
- December 17 – Orville Wright flies an aircraft with a petrol engine, the Wright Flyer, at Kitty Hawk, North Carolina in the first documented and successful powered and controlled heavier-than-air flight.
- December 30 – The Iroquois Theatre fire in Chicago kills 600.
- December 31 – The National Association for Women's Suffrage (Sweden) is founded.

=== Date unknown ===
- The first box of Crayola crayons is made and sold for five cents. It contains eight colors; brown, red, orange, yellow, green, blue, violet and black.
- American motorcycle brand Harley-Davidson is founded in Wisconsin.
- Compression Rheostat, the predecessor of industrial automation and industrial equipment parts brand Rockwell Automation, is founded in Wisconsin.

== Births ==
=== January ===
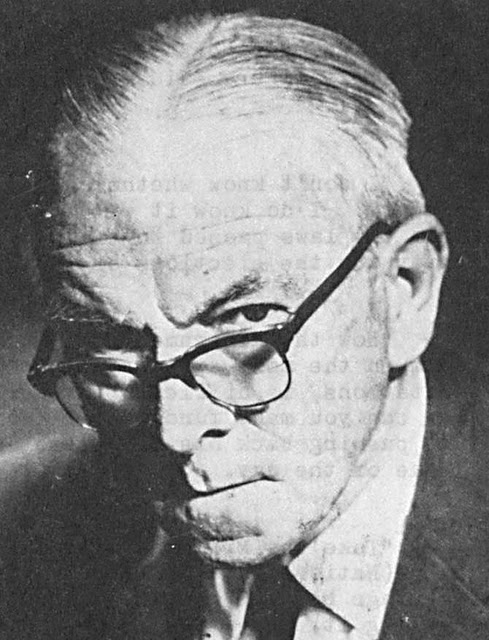
Alan Paton

- January 1 – Jasimuddin, Bangladeshi poet, lyricist, composer and writer (d. 1976)
- January 2 – Kane Tanaka, Japanese supercentenarian, oldest Japanese person ever, last surviving person born in 1903 (d. 2022)
- January 4 – Georg Elser, German carpenter and attempted assassin of Adolf Hitler (d. 1945)
- January 6 – Maurice Abravanel, Greek-born American conductor (d. 1993)
- January 10 – Barbara Hepworth, English sculptor (d. 1975)
- January 11 – Alan Paton, South African author, anti-apartheid activist (d. 1988)
- January 12 – Igor Kurchatov, Russian physicist (d. 1960)
- January 16
  - Peter Brocco, American actor (d. 1992)
  - William Grover-Williams, Anglo/French race car driver, war hero (d. 1945)
- January 22 – Fritz Houtermans, Polish physicist (d. 1966)
- January 23 – Jorge Eliécer Gaitán, Colombian politician (d. 1948)
- January 27 – John Eccles, Australian neuropsychologist, recipient of the Nobel Prize in Physiology or Medicine (d. 1997)

=== February ===
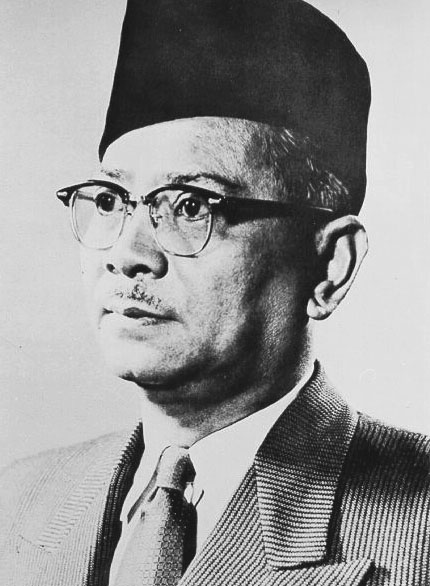
Tunku Abdul Rahman

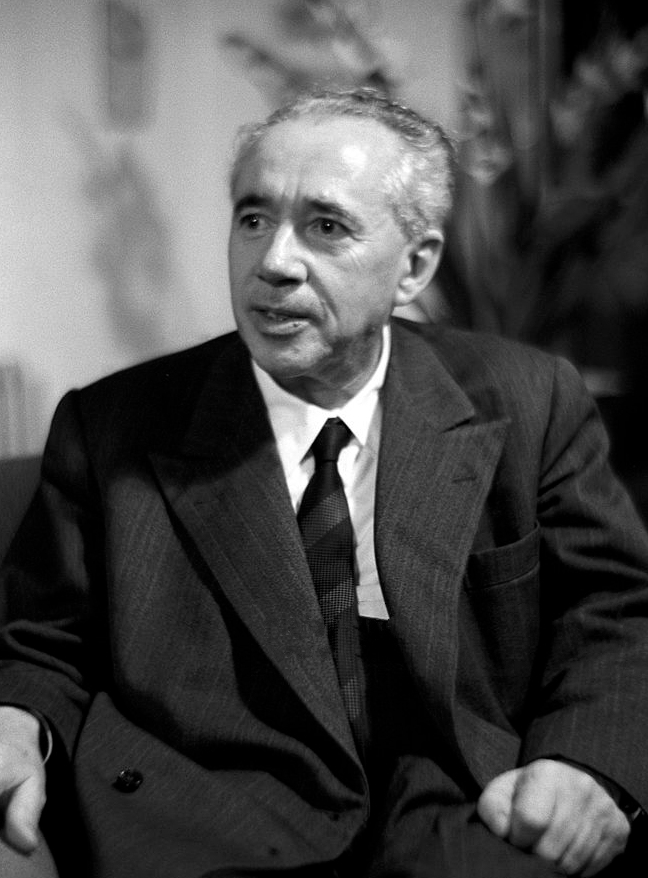
Giulio Natta

- February 3 – Douglas Douglas-Hamilton, 14th Duke of Hamilton, Scottish nobleman, aviation pioneer (d. 1973)
- February 4 – Alexander Imich, Polish-born American parapsychologist, chemist (d. 2014)
- February 6 – Claudio Arrau, Chilean-born pianist (d. 1991)
- February 8 – Tunku Abdul Rahman, first Prime Minister of Malaysia (d. 1990)
- February 10
  - Waldemar Hoven, German physician (d. 1948)
  - Matthias Sindelar, Austrian footballer (d. 1939)
- February 12 – Jorge Basadre, Peruvian historian (d. 1980)
- February 13 – Georges Simenon, Belgian writer (d. 1989)
- February 14 – Stuart Erwin, American actor (d. 1967)
- February 16 – Edgar Bergen, American ventriloquist (d. 1978)
- February 17 – Joaquín Rodríguez Ortega, Spanish bullfighter (d. 1984)
- February 21
  - Anaïs Nin, French-born American writer (d. 1977)
  - Raymond Queneau, French poet, novelist (d. 1976)
- February 22
  - Morley Callaghan, Canadian writer, media personality (d. 1990)
  - Frank Ramsey, English mathematician (d. 1930)
- February 24 – Vladimir Bartol, Slovenian author (d. 1967)
- February 26 – Giulio Natta, Italian chemist, Nobel Prize laureate (d. 1979)
- February 28 – Vincente Minnelli, American stage and film director (d. 1986)

=== March ===
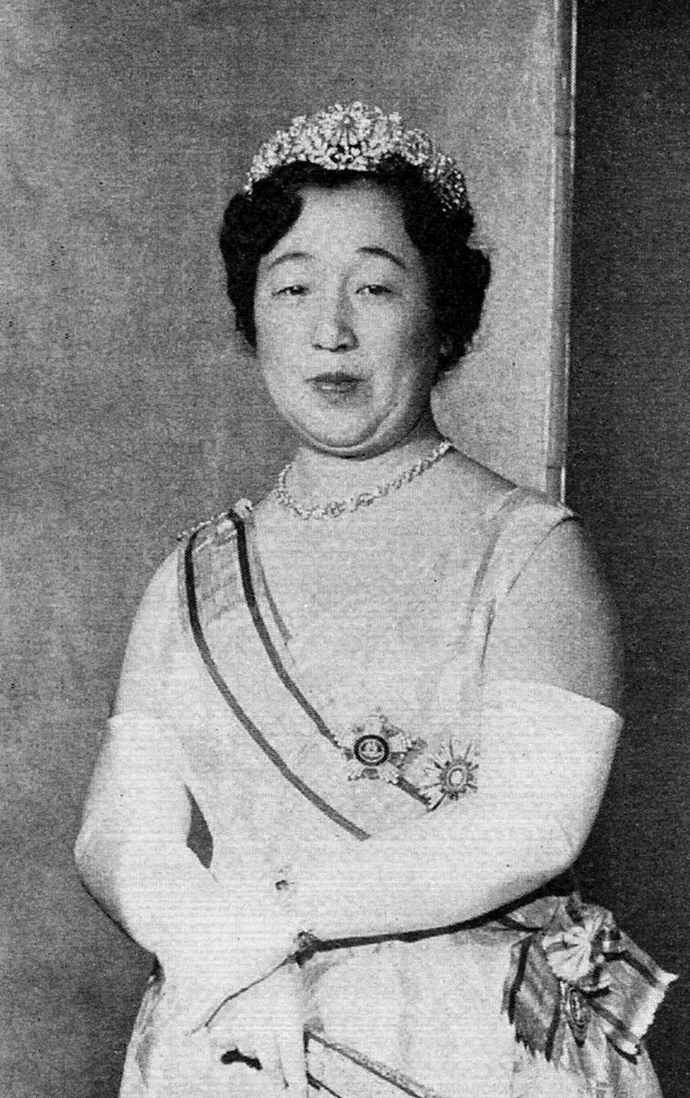
Empress Nagako

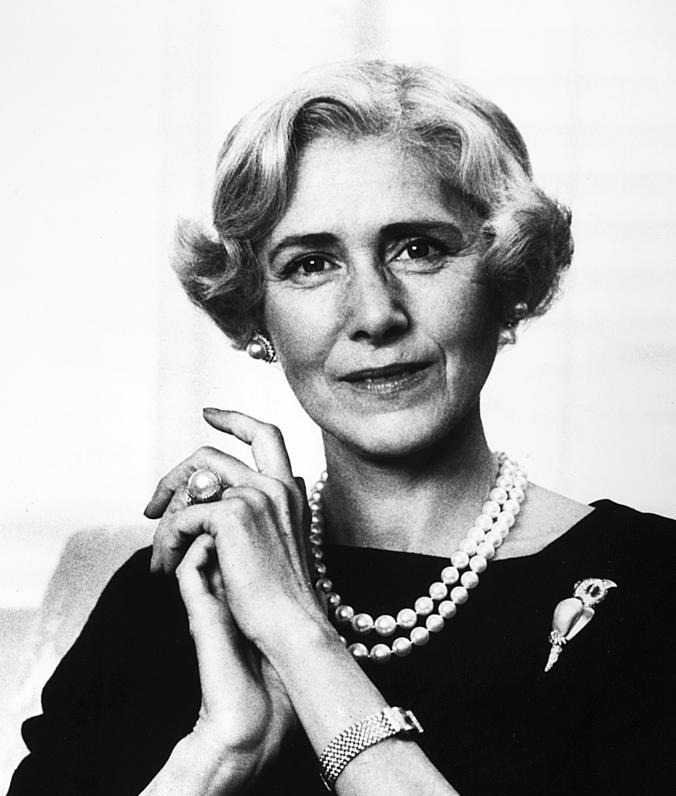
Clare Boothe Luce

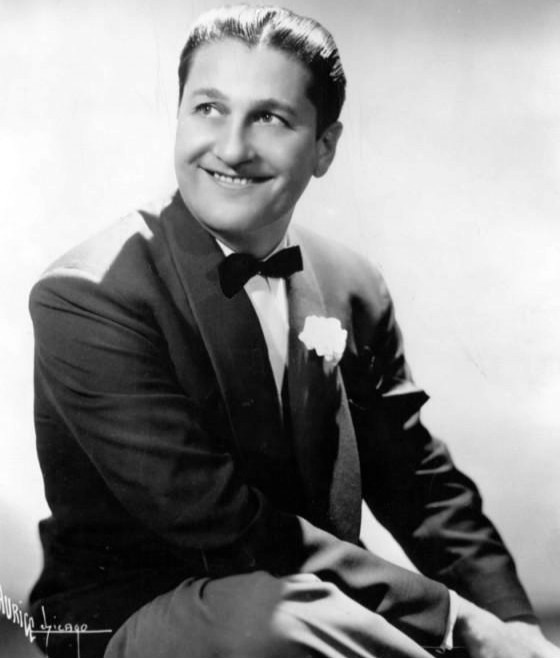
Lawrence Welk

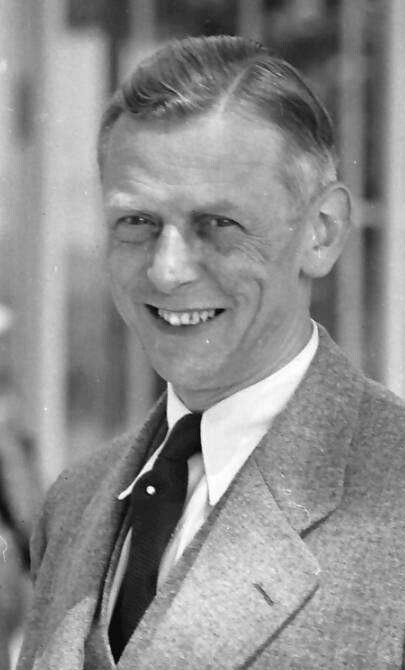
Adolf Butenandt

- March 4
  - Dorothy Mackaill, British-born American actress (d. 1990)
  - John Scarne, American magician, card expert (d. 1985)
- March 6
  - Empress Nagako, Japanese consort of Emperor Hirohito (d. 2000)
  - Józef Skoczyński, Polish Roman Catholic priest and social activist (d. 1967)
- March 10
  - Bix Beiderbecke, American jazz musician (d. 1931)
  - Clare Boothe Luce, American publisher, writer (d. 1987)
- March 11
  - Ronald Syme, New Zealand-born classicist, historian (d. 1989)
  - Lawrence Welk, American television musician, bandleader (d. 1992)
- March 14 – Mustafa Barzani, Kurdish politician (d. 1979)
- March 18 – Galeazzo Ciano, Italian aristocrat and diplomat (d. 1944)
- March 19 – Wage Rudolf Supratman, Indonesian violinist (d. 1938)
- March 20 – Edgar Buchanan, American actor (d. 1979)
- March 21 – Frank Sargeson, New Zealand writer (d. 1982)
- March 23 – Germán Busch, 36th President of Bolivia (d. 1939)
- March 24
  - Adolf Butenandt, German chemist, Nobel Prize laureate (d. 1995)
  - Malcolm Muggeridge, English journalist (d. 1990)
- March 25
  - Binnie Barnes, English actress (d. 1998)
  - Nahum Norbert Glatzer, Austrian-American historian and philosopher (d. 1990)
- March 28 – Rudolf Serkin, Austrian pianist (d. 1991)

=== April ===
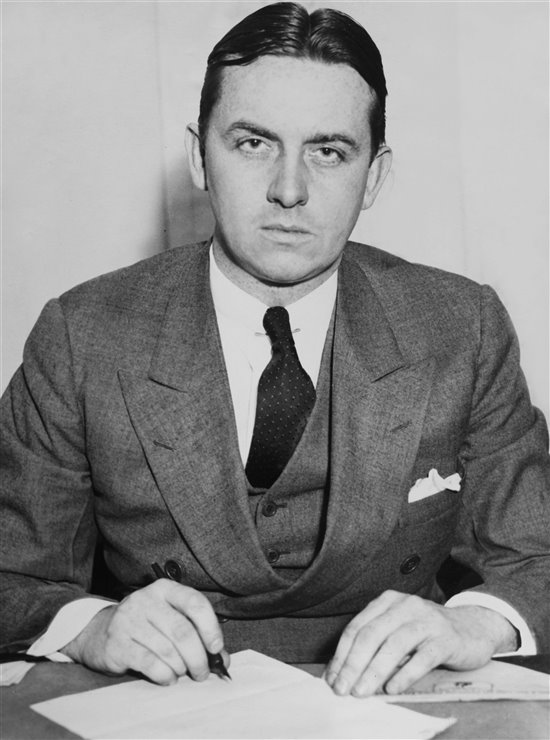
Eliot Ness

- April 3 – Lola Alvarez Bravo, Mexican photographer (d. 1993)
- April 6
  - Mickey Cochrane, American baseball player (d. 1962)
  - Doc Edgerton, American electrical engineer (d. 1990)
- April 9 – Gregory G. Pincus, American biologist, researcher (d. 1967)
- April 12 – Jan Tinbergen, Dutch economist, Nobel Prize laureate (d. 1994)
- April 15 – John Williams, English actor (d. 1983)
- April 17
  - Gregor Piatigorsky, Russian-born American cellist (d. 1976)
  - Morgan Taylor, American athlete (d. 1975)
- April 19 – Eliot Ness, American Prohibition agent (d. 1957)
- April 24 – José Antonio Primo de Rivera, Spanish politician (d. 1936)
- April 25 – Andrey Kolmogorov, Soviet mathematician (d. 1987)

=== May ===
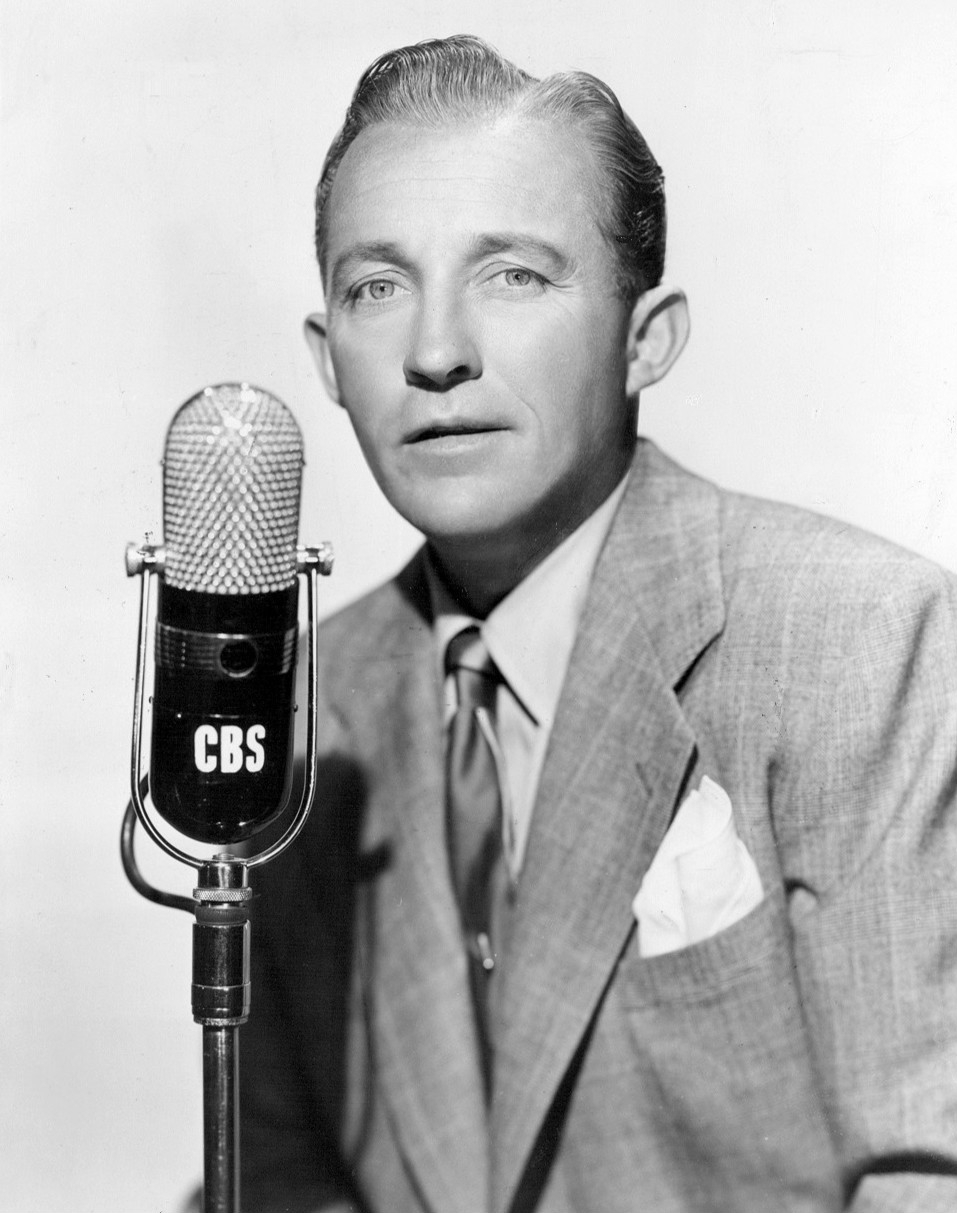
Bing Crosby

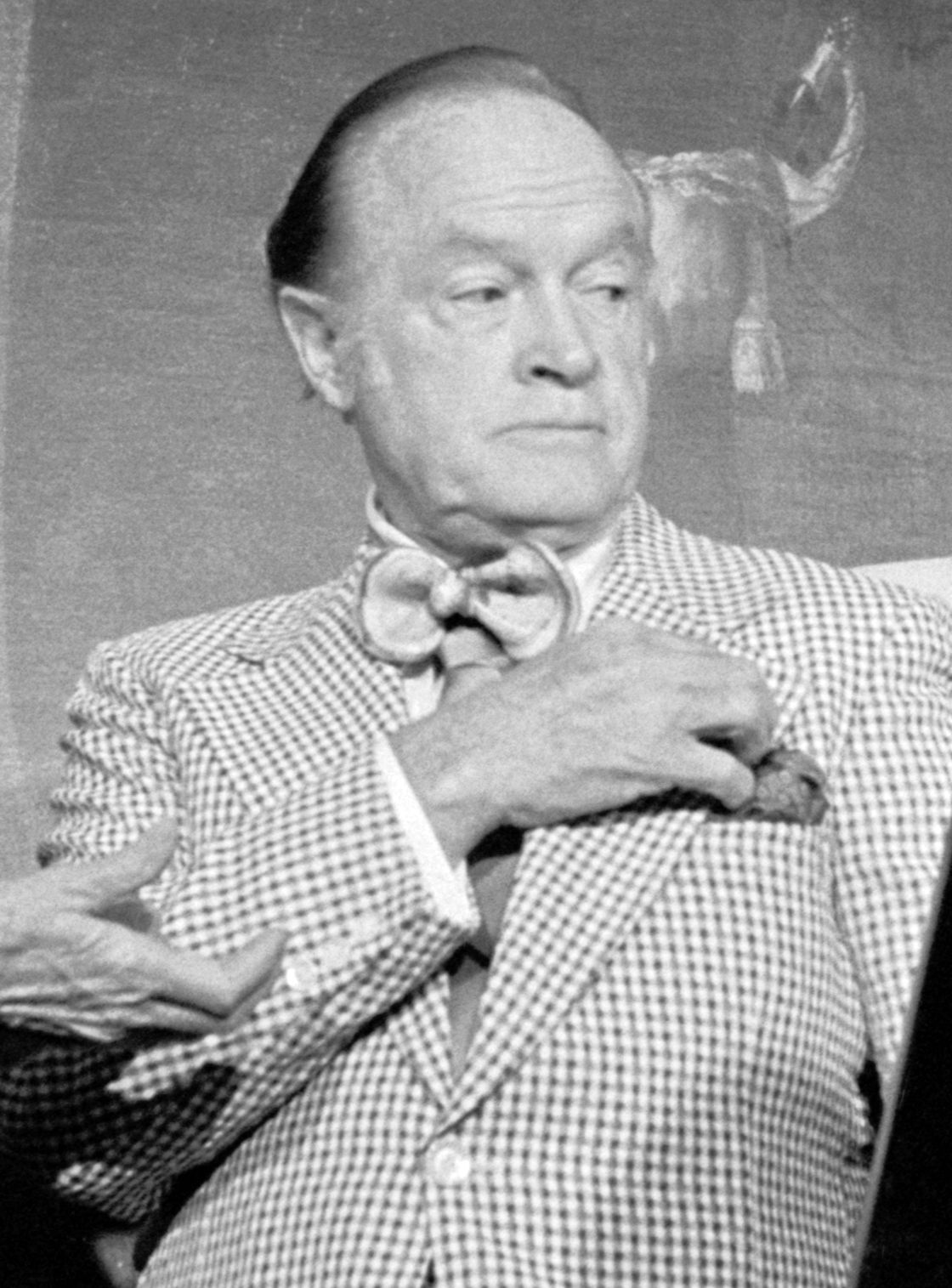
Bob Hope

- May 2 – Benjamin Spock, American pediatrician (d. 1998)
- May 3 – Bing Crosby, American singer, actor (d. 1977)
- May 4 – Luther Adler, American actor (d. 1984)
- May 8 – Fernandel, French actor (d. 1971)
- May 10 – Hans Jonas, German-born American philosopher (d. 1993)
- May 11 – Charlie Gehringer, American baseball player (d. 1993)
- May 14 – Billie Dove, American actress (d. 1997)
- May 15 – Maria Reiche, German-born Peruvian mathematician (d. 1998)
- May 29 – Bob Hope, English-born American comedian, actor (d. 2003)

=== June ===
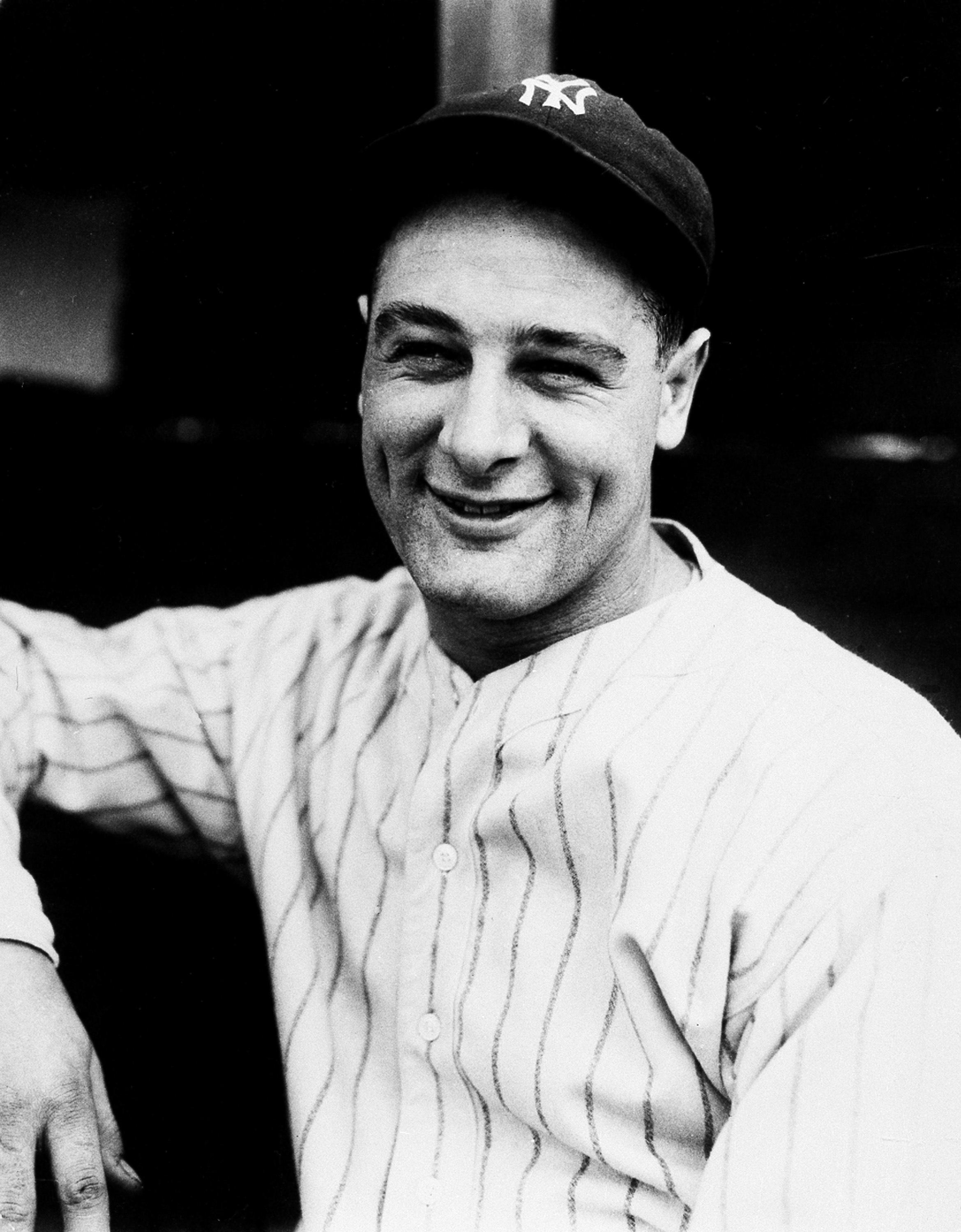
Lou Gehrig

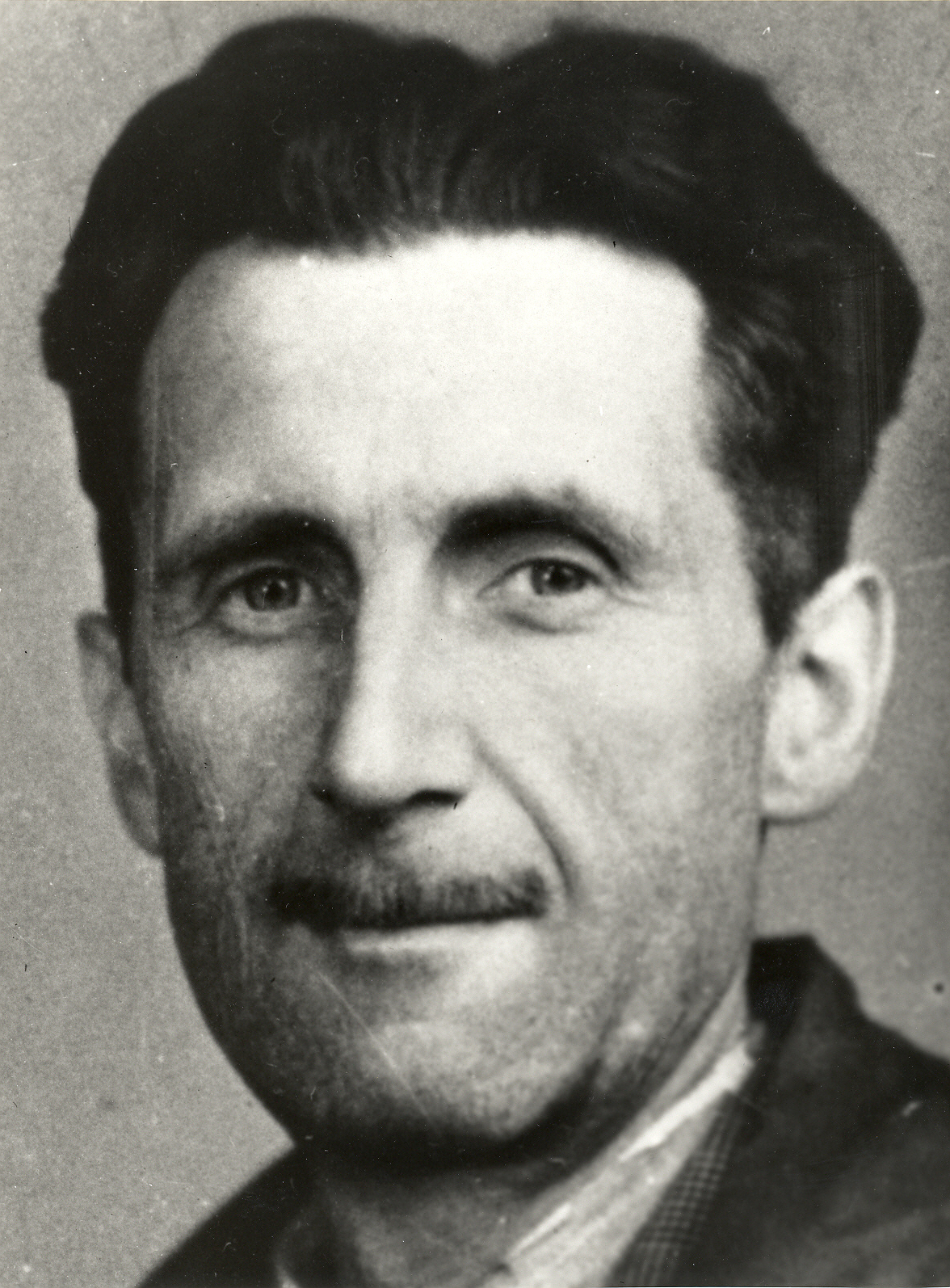
George Orwell

- June 1 – Niní Marshall, Argentine humorist, comic actress and screenwriter (d. 1996)
- June 6
  - Aram Khachaturian, Soviet-Armenian composer (d. 1978)
  - Bakht Singh, Indian evangelist, Bible teacher and preacher (d. 2000)
- June 8 – Marguerite Yourcenar, Belgian-French author (d. 1987)
- June 10 – Theo Lingen, German actor (d. 1978)
- June 18 – Jeanette MacDonald, American singer, actress (d. 1965)
- June 19
  - Lou Gehrig, American baseball player (d. 1941)
  - Wally Hammond, English cricketer (d. 1965)
- June 21 – Al Hirschfeld, American caricaturist (d. 2003)
- June 22
  - John Dillinger, American bank robber (d. 1934)
  - Jiro Horikoshi, Japanese aircraft designer (d. 1982)
  - Carl Hubbell, American baseball player (d. 1988)
- June 23
  - Louis Seigner, French actor (d. 1991)
  - Paul Martin Sr., Canadian politician (d. 1992)
- June 25
  - Pierre Brossolette, French journalist, resistance fighter (d. 1944)
  - George Orwell, English author (d. 1950)
- June 26
  - Harry DeWolf, Canadian naval officer (d. 2000)
  - Big Bill Broonzy, American blues singer, composer (d. 1958) (some sources give his year of birth as 1893)
- June 29 – Alan Blumlein, British electronics engineer (d. 1942)

=== July ===
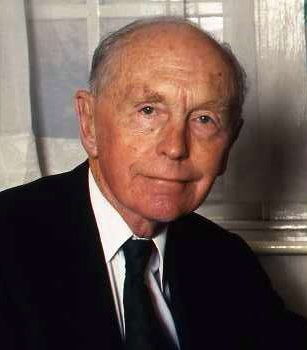
Alec Douglas-Home

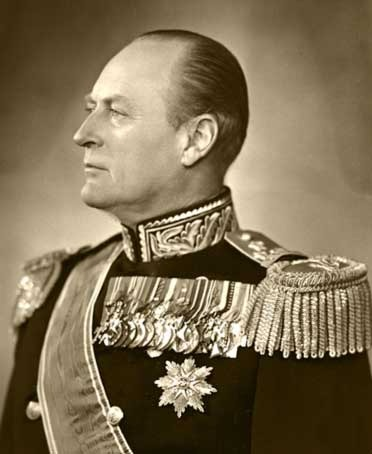
Olav V of Norway

- July 1
  - Don Beddoe, American character actor (d. 1991)
  - Amy Johnson, English aviator (d. 1941)
- July 2
  - Charles Poletti, American lawyer and politician (d. 2002)
  - Alec Douglas-Home, Prime Minister of the United Kingdom (d. 1995)
  - Olav V, King of Norway (d. 1991)
- July 3 – Ace Bailey, Canadian ice hockey player (d. 1992)
- July 4 – Howard Hobson, American basketball player and coach (d. 1991)
- July 6 – Hugo Theorell, Swedish scientist, recipient of the Nobel Prize in Physiology or Medicine (d. 1982)
- July 7 – Steven Runciman, English historian (d. 2000)
- July 10 – Werner Best, German SS officer, jurist (d. 1989)
- July 12 – Judith Hare, Countess of Listowel, Hungarian-born journalist, writer (d. 2003)
- July 13 – Kenneth Clark, English art historian (d. 1983)
- July 14 – Thomas D. Clark, American historian (d. 2005)
- July 16 – Mary Philbin, American silent film actress (d. 1993)
- July 18 – Victor Gruen, Austrian-American architect and inventor of the shopping mall (d. 1980)
- July 21 – Roy Neuberger, American financier, art collector (d. 2010)
- July 26 – Estes Kefauver, American politician (d. 1963)
- July 27 – Michail Stasinopoulos, 1st president of Greece (d. 2002)

=== August ===
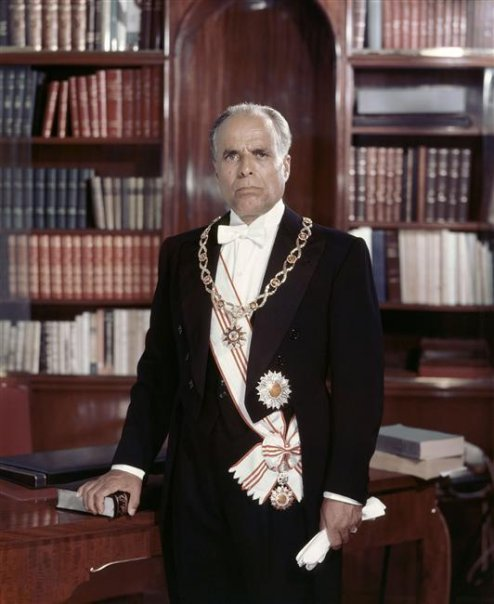
Habib Bourguiba

- August 3
  - Habib Bourguiba, 1st president of Tunisia (d. 2000)
  - Fahri Korutürk, 6th president of Turkey (d. 1987)
- August 5 – Prince Nicholas of Romania (d. 1978)
- August 6 – Virginia Foster Durr, American civil rights activist (d. 1999)
- August 7 – Louis Leakey, British archaeologist (d. 1972)
- August 19 – James Gould Cozzens, American writer (d. 1978)
- August 24 – Graham Sutherland, English artist (d. 1980)
- August 26 – Ian Dalrymple, British screenwriter, film director and producer (d. 1989)
- August 31 – Arthur Godfrey, American radio, television host (d. 1983)

=== September ===
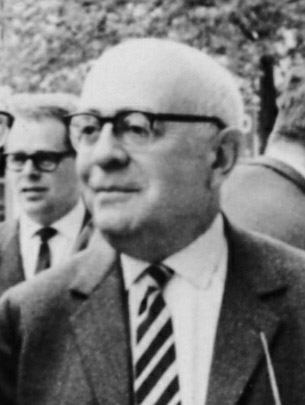
Theodor W. Adorno

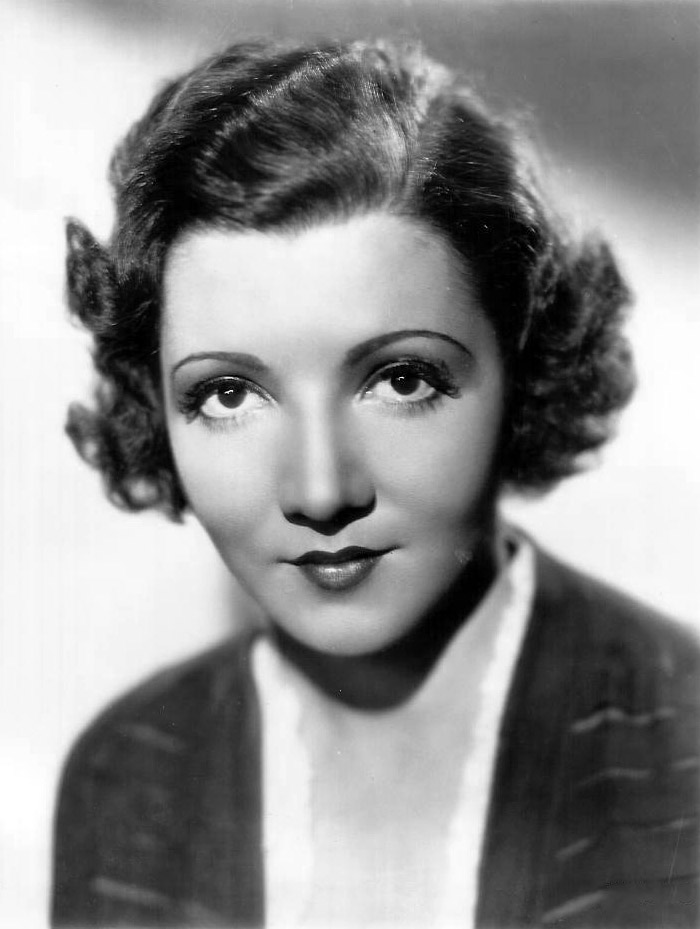
Claudette Colbert

- September 9 – Edward Upward, English author (d. 2009)
- September 10 – Cyril Connolly, English critic, writer (d. 1974)
- September 11 – Theodor W. Adorno, German philosopher (d. 1969)
- September 13
  - Claudette Colbert, American actress (d. 1996)
  - Alberta Williams King, American civil rights champion, wife of Martin Luther King Sr., and mother of Martin Luther King Jr. (assassinated 1974)
- September 15
  - Roy Acuff, American country musician (d. 1992)
  - Yisrael Kristal, Polish-born Israeli supercentenarian, Holocaust survivor, and former world's oldest living man (d. 2017)
- September 20 – Gertrud Arndt, German photographer (d. 2000)
- September 21 – Preston Tucker, American automobile designer (d. 1956)
- September 25
  - Abul A'la Maududi, Pakistani journalist, theologian, and philosopher (d. 1979)
  - Mark Rothko, Latvian-born American painter (d. 1970)

=== October ===
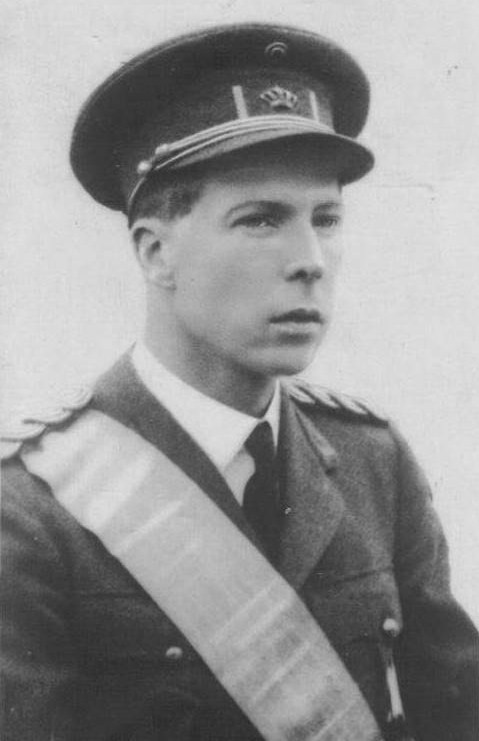
Prince Charles, Count of Flanders

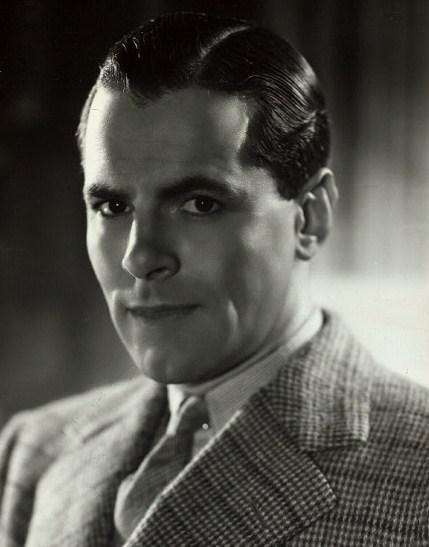
John Davis Lodge

- October 1 – Vladimir Horowitz, Russian-born American pianist (d. 1989)
- October 4 – John Vincent Atanasoff, American computer engineer (d. 1995)
- October 5 – M. King Hubbert, American geophysicist (d. 1989)
- October 6 – Ernest Walton, Irish physicist, Nobel Prize laureate (d. 1995)
- October 8 – Ferenc Nagy, 40th prime minister of Hungary (d. 1979)
- October 9 – Walter O'Malley, American baseball executive (d. 1979)
- October 10 – Prince Charles, Count of Flanders (d. 1983)
- October 16 – Rex Bell, American actor and politician (d. 1962)
- October 18 – Lina Radke, German athlete (d. 1983)
- October 20 – John Davis Lodge, American actor and politician (d. 1985)
- October 22
  - George Beadle, American geneticist, recipient of the Nobel Prize in Physiology or Medicine (d. 1989)
  - Curly Howard, American comedian, actor (The Three Stooges) (d. 1952)
- October 24 – Melvin Purvis, American lawman and FBI agent (d. 1960)
- October 28 – Evelyn Waugh, English novelist (d. 1966)
- October 31 – Joan Robinson, English economist (d. 1983)

=== November ===
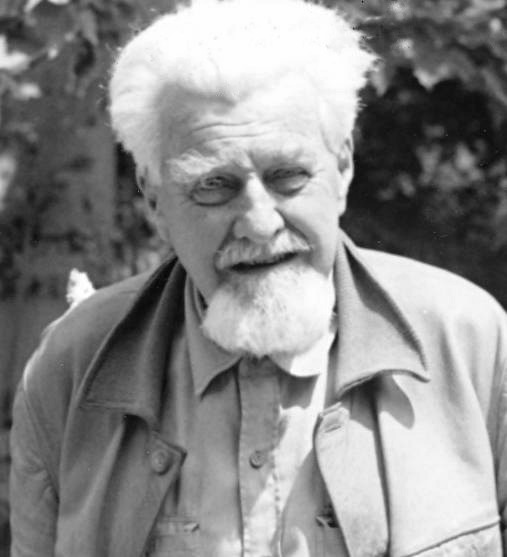
Konrad Lorenz

- November 1 – Max Adrian, Irish actor (d. 1973)
- November 3
  - Walker Evans, American photographer (d. 1975)
  - Charles Rigoulot, French weightlifter (d. 1962)
- November 4 – Watchman Nee, Chinese Christian preacher, church leader (d. 1972)
- November 7
  - Dean Jagger, American actor (d. 1991)
  - Konrad Lorenz, Austrian zoologist, recipient of the Nobel Prize in Physiology or Medicine (d. 1989)
- November 11 – Isaac Bashevis Singer, Polish-American novelist, writer and Nobel Prize laureate (d. 1991)
- November 12 – Jack Oakie, American actor (d. 1978)
- November 19 – Nancy Carroll, American actress (d. 1965)
- November 25 – DeHart Hubbard, American Olympic athlete (d. 1976)
- November 26 – Alice Herz-Sommer, Czech-British supercentenarian and pianist and teacher (d. 2014)
- November 27 – Lars Onsager, Norwegian-born American chemist, Nobel Prize laureate (d. 1976)

=== December ===
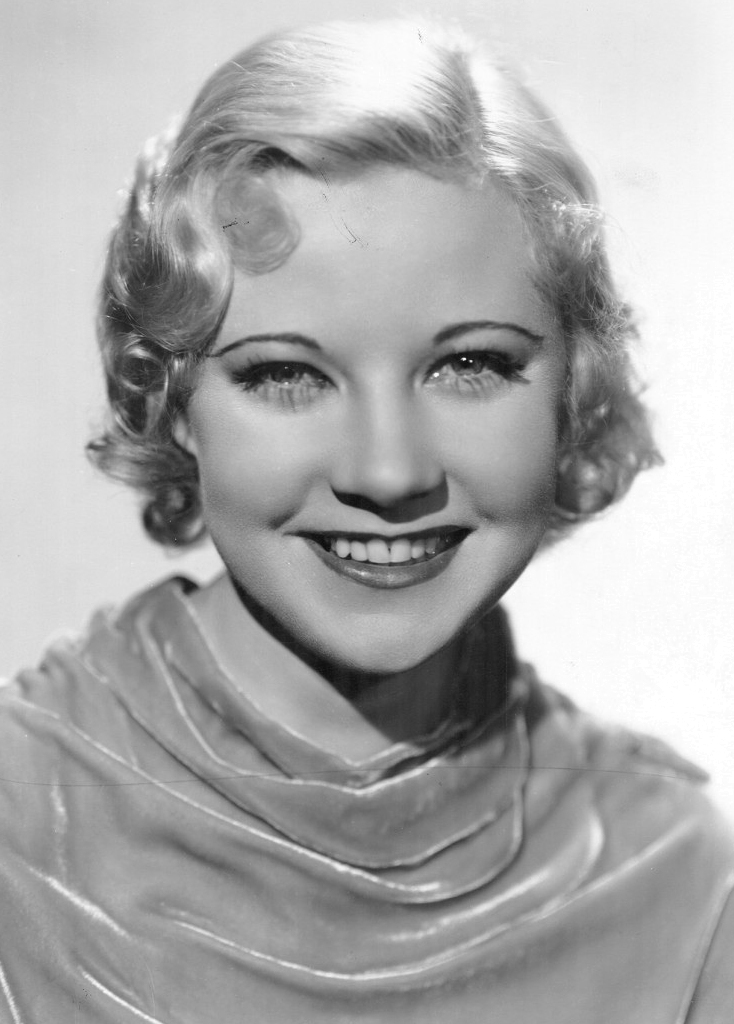
Una Merkel

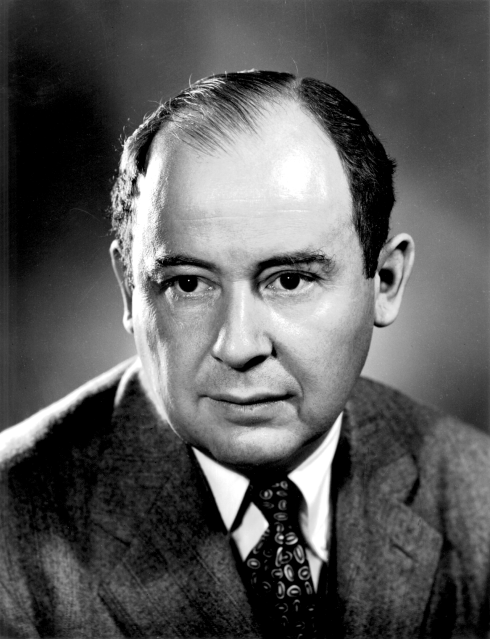
John von Neumann

- December 4 – A. L. Rowse, English historian (d. 1997)
- December 5
  - Johannes Heesters, Dutch singer, actor (d. 2011)
  - C. F. Powell, British physicist, Nobel Prize laureate (d. 1969)
- December 10 – Una Merkel, American actress (d. 1986)
- December 12 – Yasujirō Ozu, Japanese film director (d. 1963)
- December 13 – Ella Baker, American civil rights activist (d. 1986)
- December 16 – Harold Whitlock, British Olympic athlete (d. 1985)
- December 17 – Erskine Caldwell, American author (d. 1987)
- December 19 – George Davis Snell, American geneticist, recipient of the Nobel Prize in Physiology or Medicine (d. 1996)
- December 22 – Haldan Keffer Hartline, American physiologist, Nobel Prize laureate (d. 1983)
- December 24 – Joseph Cornell, American sculptor (d. 1972)
- December 26 – Elisha Cook Jr., American actor (d. 1995)
- December 28
  - Earl Hines, American jazz pianist (d. 1983)
  - John von Neumann, Hungarian-born American mathematician (d. 1957)

== Deaths ==
=== January–June ===
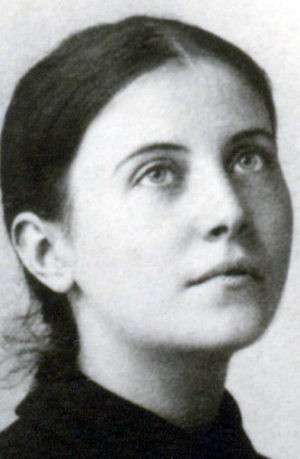
Saint Gemma Galgani

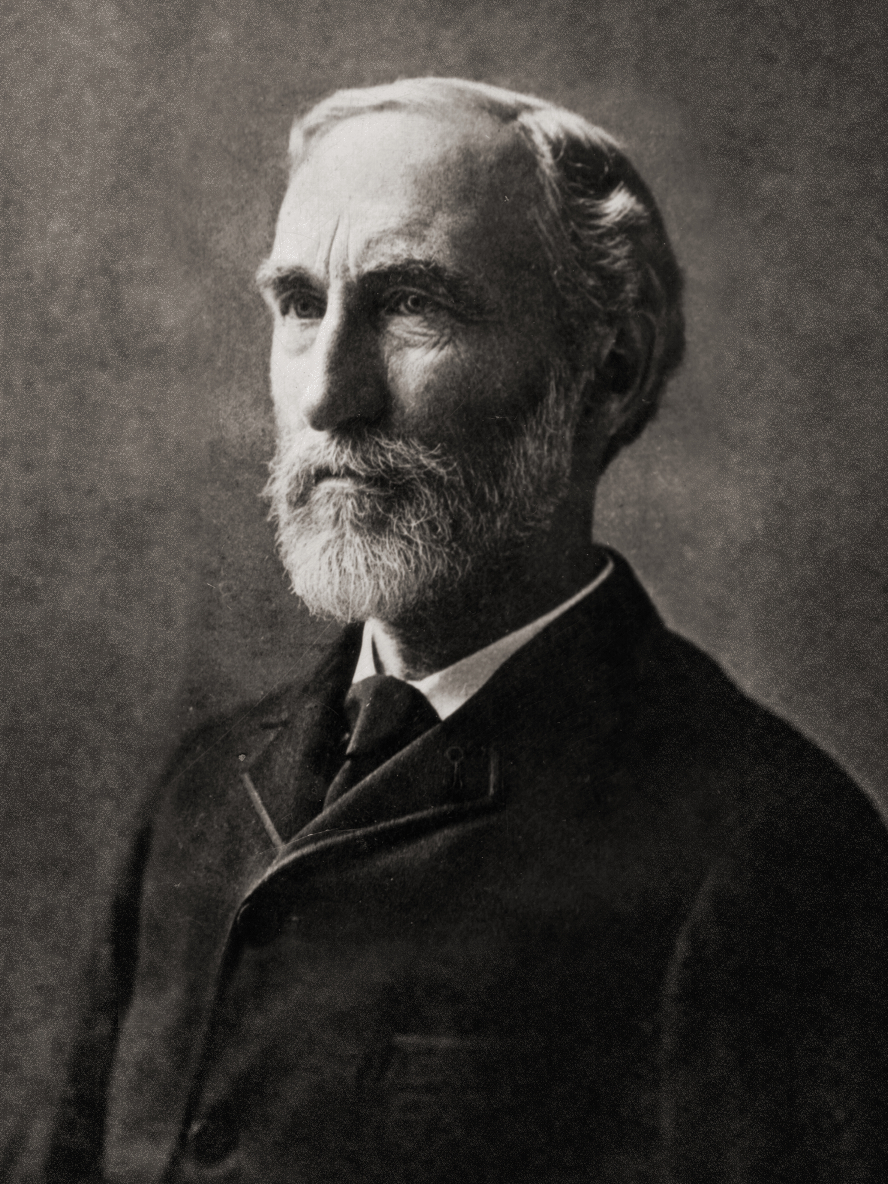
Josiah Willard Gibbs

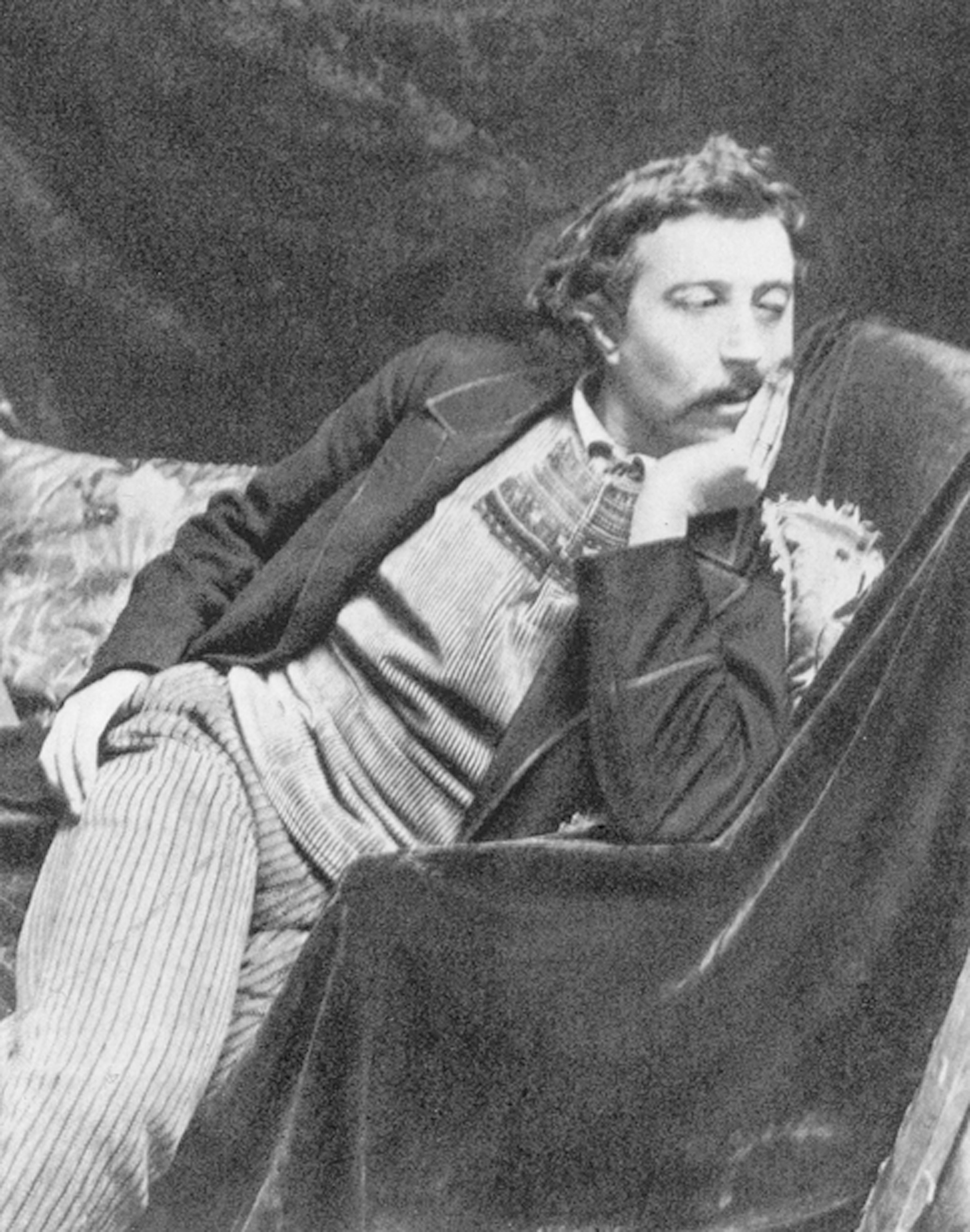
Paul Gauguin

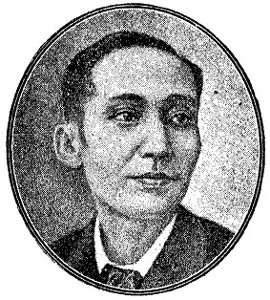
Apolinario Mabini

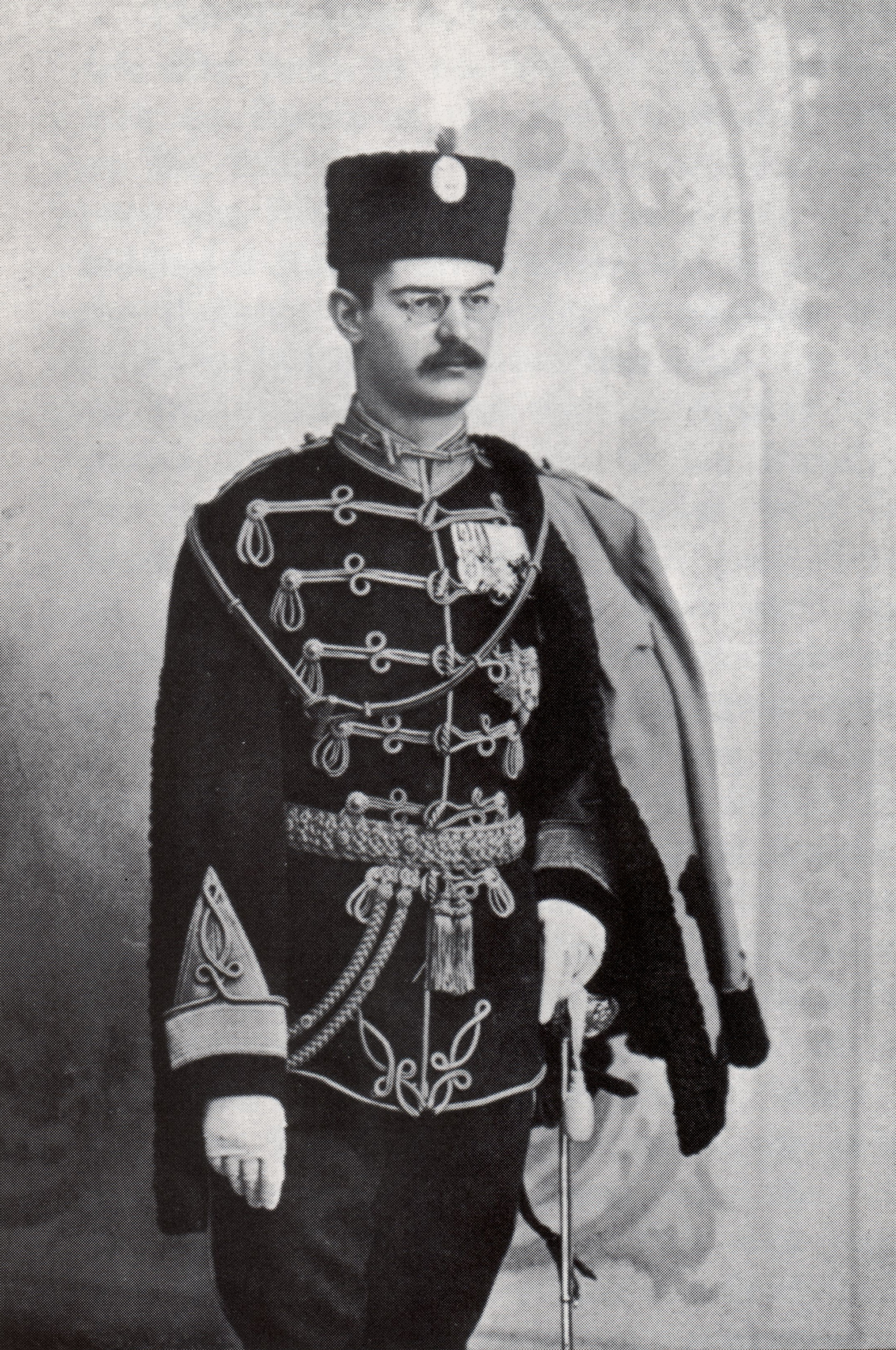
King Alexander I of Serbia

- January 3 – Alois Hitler, Austrian civil servant, father of Adolf Hitler (b. 1837)
- January 4
  - Alexander Aksakov, Russian writer (b. 1832)
  - Gulstan Ropert, missionary (b. 1839)
  - Topsy, elephant (b. 1875)
- January 5 – Práxedes Mateo Sagasta, Spanish politician, eight-time prime minister (b. 1825)
- January 7 – Robert Atkinson Davis, businessman, politician and 4th Premier of Manitoba (b. 1841)
- January 17 – Quintin Hogg, British philanthropist (b. 1845)
- January 24 – Petko Karavelov, 4th Prime Minister of Bulgaria (b. 1843)
- January 28
  - Augusta Holmès, French composer (b. 1847)
  - Robert Planquette, French composer (b. 1850)
  - John B. Allen, U.S. Senator from Washington from 1889 to 1893 (b. 1845)
- February 1 – Sir George Gabriel Stokes, Irish mathematician, physicist (b. 1819)
- February 3 – David George Ritchie, Scottish philosopher (b. 1853)
- February 4 – Zhang Peilun, Chinese naval commander and government official (b. 1848)
- February 7 – James Glaisher, English meteorologist, aeronaut (b. 1809)
- February 9 – Sir Charles Duffy, Irish-born Australian politician, 8th Premier of Victoria (b. 1816)
- February 14 – Archduchess Elisabeth Franziska of Austria (b. 1831)
- February 17 – Joseph Parry, Welsh composer (b. 1841)
- February 18
  - Prince Komatsu Akihito, Field Marshal, Chief of the General Staff (b. 1846)
  - Onoe Kikugorō V, kabuki actor (b. 1844)
- February 21 – Kate Vaughan, British dancer and actress (b. 1852)
- February 22
  - Hugo Wolf, Austrian composer (b. 1860)
  - Victor Meirelles, painter (b. 1832)
- February 26 – Richard Jordan Gatling, American inventor (b. 1818)
- March 2 – Rafael Zaldívar, former President of El Salvador (b. 1834)
- March 3 – Robert Sanford Foster, Union Army general (b. 1834)
- March 4 – Joseph Henry Shorthouse, English novelist (b. 1834)
- March 5 – Gaston Paris, French scholar (b. 1839)
- March 7
  - István Bittó, 7th prime minister of Hungary (b. 1822)
  - John Studholme, politician and farmer (b. 1829).
- March 11 – Lou Graham (Seattle madame), American brothel owner (b. 1857)
- March 13 – George Granville Bradley, English vicar, scholar (b. 1821)
- March 16 – Roy Bean, American justice of the peace (b. 1825)
- March 20 – Charles Godfrey Leland, humorist, folklorist and poet (b. 1824)
- March 25 – Sir Hector MacDonald, British army general (b. 1853)
- March 28 – Émile Baudot, French telegraph engineer (b. 1845)
- March 29 – Gustavus Franklin Swift, businessman (b. 1839)
- April 4 – Margaret Ann Neve, English supercentenarian (b. 1792)
- April 5 – Tom Allen, English boxer (b. 1839)
- April 11
  - Gemma Galgani, Italian mystic, Catholic saint (b. 1878)
  - Ronglu, Manchu political and military leader of the late Qing dynasty (b. 1836)
- April 13 – Moritz Lazarus, German philosopher (born 1824)
- April 19 – Sir Oliver Mowat, Canadian politician (b. 1820)
- April 22 – Alexander Ramsey, 2nd Governor of Minnesota from 1860 to 1863 and U.S. Senator from Minnesota from 1863 to 1875 (b. 1815)
- April 24 – Walter Osborne, Irish painter (b. 1859)
- April 27 – William Travers, lawyer, politician, explorer, and naturalist in New Zealand (b. 1819)
- April 28
  - Frances Augusta Conant, American journalist (b. 1841)
  - Josiah Willard Gibbs, American physical chemist (b. 1839)
  - Saigō Tanomo, Shinto priest, martial artist and former Samurai (b. 1830)
- April 29 – Stuart Robson, American stage actor, comedian (b. 1836)
- April 30 – Emily Stowe, first female doctor to practice in Canada and women's rights and suffrage activist (b. 1831)
- May 4 – Gotse Delchev, Macedonian Bulgarian revolutionary (b. 1872)
- May 8 – Paul Gauguin, French painter (b. 1848)
- May 11 – Vilhelm Kyhn, painter and educator (b. 1819)
- May 13 – Apolinario Mabini, Filipino political theoretician, Prime Minister of the Philippines (b. 1864)
- May 19 – Carl Snoilsky, poet (b. 1841)
- June 9 – Gaspar Núñez de Arce, Spanish poet (b. 1834)
- June 11
  - Alexander I, King of Serbia (b. 1876)
  - Nikolai Bugaev, Russian mathematician (b. 1837)
  - Draga Mašin, Serbian queen consort (b. 1861)
- June 14 – Carl Gegenbaur, German anatomist (b. 1826)
- June 15 – Joseph Abbott, Australian wool-broker and politician (b. 1843)
- June 19
- Herbert Vaughan, English Catholic cardinal, archbishop (b. 1832)

=== July–December ===
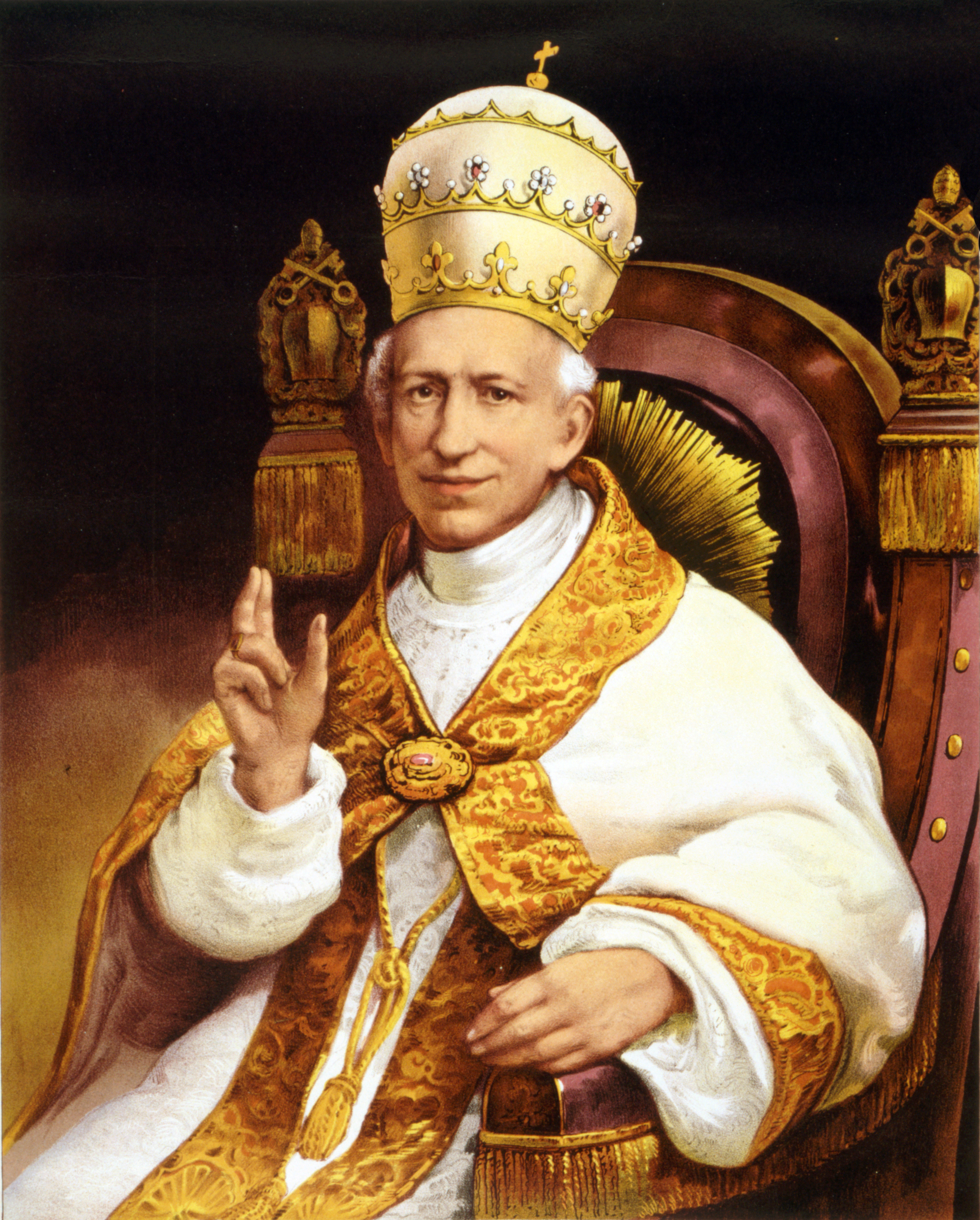
Pope Leo XIII

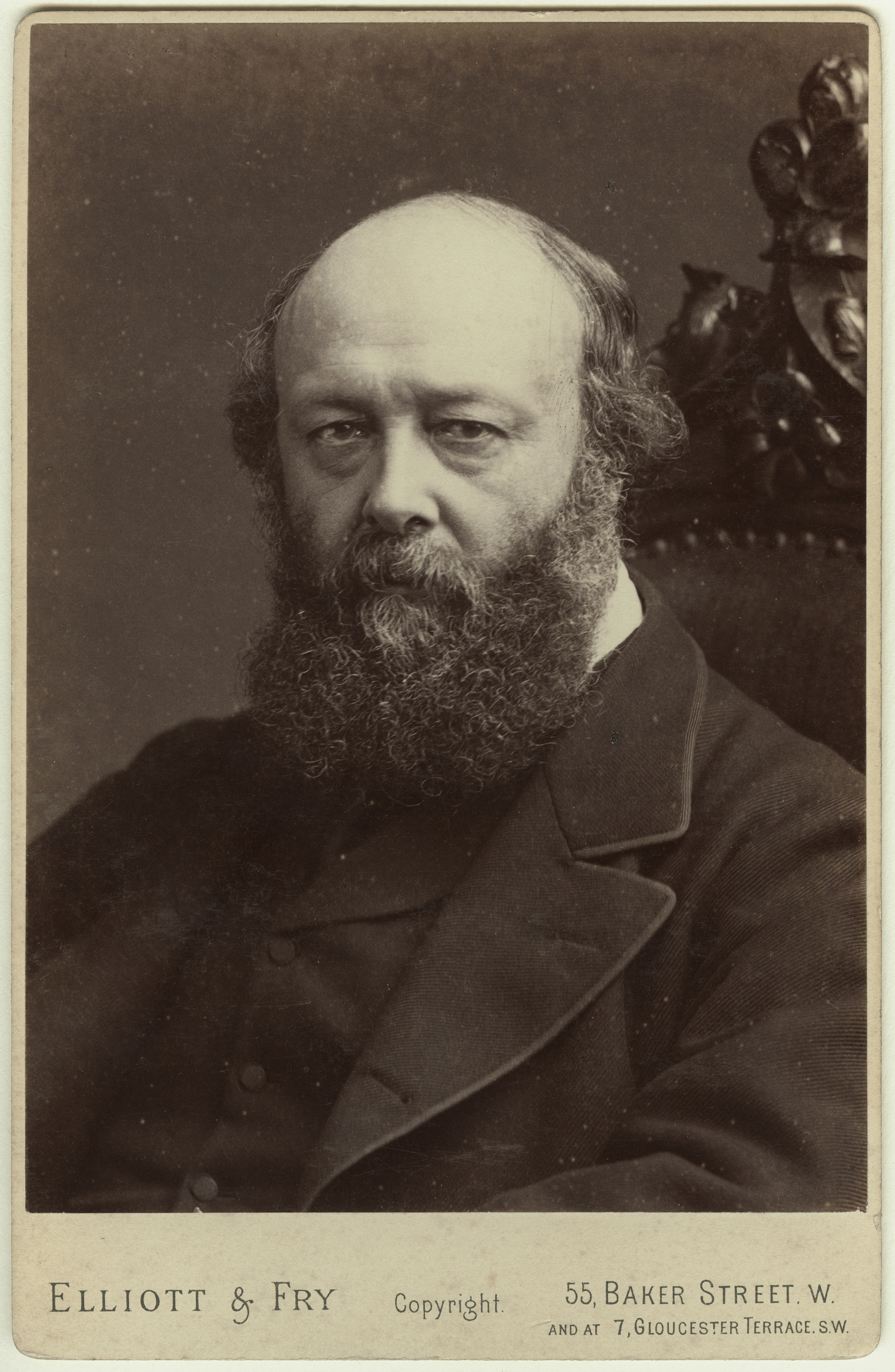
Lord Salisbury

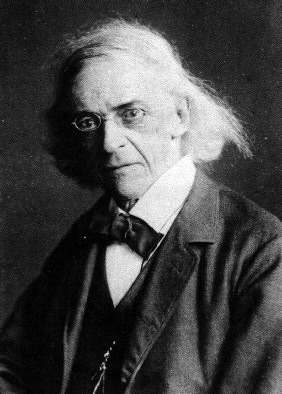
Theodor Mommsen

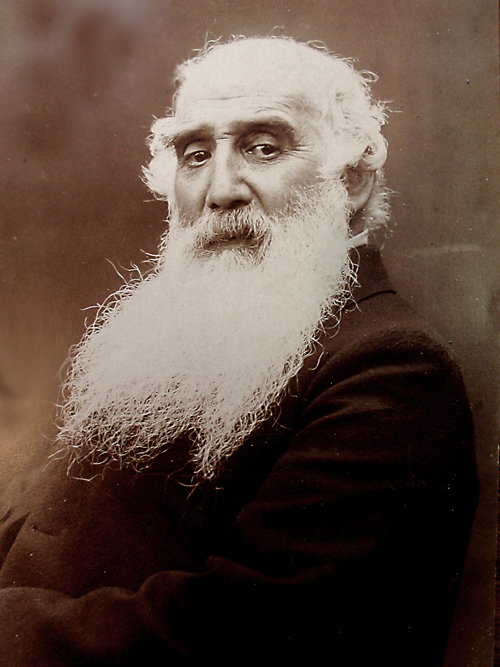
Camille Pissarro

- July 2 – Ed Delahanty, American baseball player, MLB Hall of Famer (b. 1867)
- July 3 – Harriet Lane, Acting First Lady of the United States (b. 1830)
- July 11 – William Ernest Henley, English poet, critic and editor (b. 1849)
- July 13 – Béni Kállay, Austro-Hungarian statesman (b. 1839)
- July 14
  - Sahibzada Abdul Latif, Afghan royal advisor and Ahmadi martyr (b. 1853)
  - Manuel Antonio Caro, Chilean painter (b. 1835)
- July 17 – James McNeill Whistler, American painter (b. 1834)
- July 20 – Pope Leo XIII, Italian Roman Catholic Pope (b. 1810)
- July 21 – Henri Alexis Brialmont, military architect (b. 1821)
- July 27 – Lina Sandell, hymn writer (b. 1832).
- August 1 – Calamity Jane, American frontierswoman (b. 1852)
- August 3 – Édouard Pottier, French admiral (b. 1839)
- August 5 – Phil May, English artist (b. 1864)
- August 11 – Eugenio María de Hostos, Puerto Rican philosopher, sociologist (b. 1839)
- August 17 – Hans Gude, Norwegian painter (b. 1825)
- August 22 – Robert Gascoyne-Cecil, 3rd Marquess of Salisbury, Prime Minister of the United Kingdom (b. 1830)
- August 23 – Fray Mocho, Argentine writer (b. 1858)
- August 27 – Kusumoto Ine, physician, first female doctor of Western medicine in Japan (b. 1827)
- August 28 – Frederick Law Olmsted, American landscape architect (b. 1822)
- August 30 – Joe Warbrick, Māori rugby union player (b. 1862).
- August 31 – William Hastie, clergyman and theologian (b. 1842)
- September 1 – Charles Renouvier, French philosopher (b. 1815)
- September 2 – Julia McNair Wright, American author (b. 1840)
- September 13 – Carl Schuch, Austrian painter (b. 1846)
- September 14 – Johanna Berglind, sign language teacher and principal (b. 1816).
- September 18
  - Alexander Bain, Scottish philosopher (b. 1818)
  - Jules Pellechet, French architect (b. 1829)
- September 19 – Washington Teasdale, English engineer (b. 1830)
- October 4 – Otto Weininger, Austrian-Jewish author (b. 1880)
- October 20 – Thomas Vincent Welch, American politician (b. 1850)
- October 22 – William Edward Hartpole Lecky, Irish historian, member of the House of Commons (b. 1838
- October 27 – Erika Nissen, pianist (b. 1845)
- November 1 – Theodor Mommsen, German writer, Nobel Prize laureate (b. 1817)
- November 11 – Lavilla Esther Allen, American author (b. 1834)
- November 13 – Camille Pissarro, French painter (b. 1830)
- November 20 – Tom Horn, gunfighter and outlaw (born 1860)
- November 25 – Sabino Arana, Spanish Basque writer, nationalist (b. 1865)
- December 8 – Herbert Spencer, English philosopher (b. 1820)
- December 27 – Lydia Hoyt Farmer, American author, women's rights activist (b. 1842)
- December 28 – Margaret Frances Sullivan, Irish-born American author, journalist and editor (b. 1847)
- December 29
  - Baba Jaimal Singh, Founder of Radha Soami Satsang Beas (b. 1839)
  - Jerome Sykes, American actor (b. 1868)

=== Unknown date ===
- Mary Elizabeth Beauchamp, American educator and author (b. 1825)

== Nobel Prizes ==

- Physics – Antoine Henri Becquerel, Pierre Curie, and Marie Curie
- Chemistry – Svante August Arrhenius
- Medicine – Niels Ryberg Finsen
- Literature – Bjørnstjerne Bjørnson
- Peace – William Randal Cremer

== Sources ==
- Gilbert, Martin (1997). "1903". A History of the Twentieth Century, Volume One: 1900-1933. New York: HarperCollins. pp. 69–88. ISBN 0-688-10064-3.
