= The Golden Life (disambiguation) =

The Golden Life is a reality television program broadcast by E! Entertainment Television.

The Golden Life may also refer to:

- The Golden Life, 1867 book by Julia McNair Wright
- The Golden Life, 2004 novel by Dibyendu Palit
- The Golden Life, 2022 punk rock album by Pulley (band)
