= Pasadena Motorcycle Club =

American motorcycle club

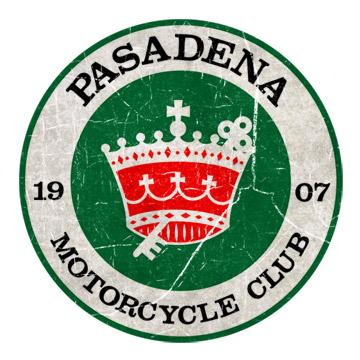
- Founded: May 20, 1907; 118 years ago
- Founded at: Pasadena, California
- Type: Non-profit organization
- Region served: California, US
- Website: https://www.pasadenamotorcycleclub.com

The Pasadena Motorcycle Club is an American motorcycle club known, from its founding in 1907 through the 1970s, for sponsoring events such as enduro and hare and hound races, and, since the 1980s, for street riding, poker runs and charity events.

Formed on May 20, 1907 in Pasadena, California, the Pasadena Motorcycle Club was called by Rider magazine the third oldest in the US, in a tie with the Oakland MC, also formed in 1907. The older clubs are the Yonkers Motorcycle Club, formed in 1903 and the San Francisco Motorcycle Club, 1904.

The Club was active through World War I and World War II. The PMC has had several clubhouses before moving into the current Howard Street location in 1946. The PMC is a family club, not an outlaw motorcycle club. It promotes motorcycle road rides and events every year that are open to the public, often benefiting a charity such as the Optimist Youth Homes and Family Services. Since 1937, the PMC has run the annual two-day Greenhorn Enduro, originally a grueling 500 mi (800 km) desert enduro, becoming, after 1979, a scenic road tour.

== Notable members ==
- Fred Ludlow. Flat Track Racing Champion at the Motorcycle Hall of Fame
- Earl Flanders. Off-road racer, Land Speed Record Steward, Manufacturer, Distributor at the Motorcycle Hall of Fame
- Fred "Iron Man" Ham. Three-Flags Record Holder, Speed and Endurance Record Holder at the Motorcycle Hall of Fame
- Max Bubeck. Greenhorn Enduro Winner, Land Speed Record Holder at the Motorcycle Hall of Fame
- Bob Greene. Former editor at Cycle and Motorcyclist. Author.Organizer of Greenhorn Enduro. at the Motorcycle Hall of Fame
- Del Kuhn. 1950 AMA National Enduro Champion. Three-time winner of the Greenhorn Enduro. Class A Enduro Pacific Coast Championship winner in 1948, '50, '51, '52. at the Motorcycle Hall of Fame
- Ed Waldheim. President of the California Off-Road Vehicle Association, which he greatly expanded. Lifelong activist for off-road riders. at the Motorcycle Hall of Fame
