= Enduro motorcycle =

Offroad suited type of motorcycle

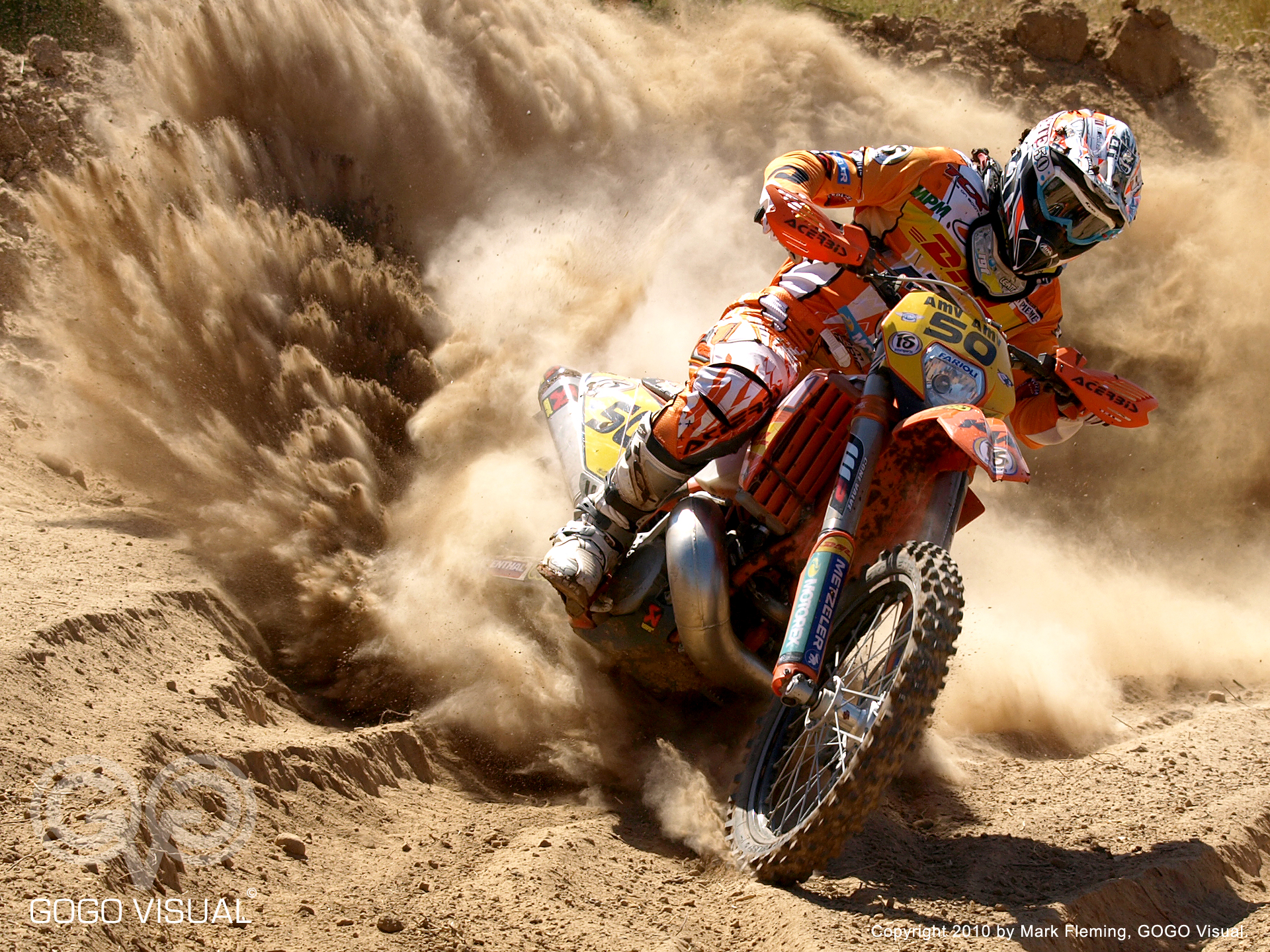
Simone Albergoni at the 2010 World Enduro Championship

An enduro motorcycle is an off-road racing motorcycle used in enduros, which are long-distance cross-country, Trails, time trial competitions.

== Types and features of enduro motorcycles ==
Enduro motorcycles closely resemble motocross, or "MX" bikes (upon which they are often based). They may have special features such as oversized fuel tanks (for more range), engines tuned for reliability and longevity, sump protectors, and more durable (and heavier) components. Enduro bikes combine the long-travel suspension of an MX bike with engines that are reliable over long distances. The engine of an enduro bike is generally a single cylinder 2-stroke between 125 cc and 350 cc, or a single cylinder 4-stroke between 125 cc and 650 cc.

There may exist several design differences between enduro motorcycles and moto/supercross bikes, according to the rules of the particular competition. For an enduro event such as endurocross (Enduro-X), these may include:

- Headlight for on-road and after-dark use
- Brake light/tail light for on-road use
- Protective hardware such as brake and clutch handguards for protection against branches and leaves i.e. "bark busters"
- Exhaust system that is street legal and meets regulations for noise and spark arresting
- Wide-ratio gear box
- Narrower handlebars so that the bike can fit between branches and trees easily
- Roll chart holder/Enduro computer
- Heavy flywheel

Some enduro bikes have street-legal features such as brake lights, turn signals, quiet mufflers and DOT certified tires allowing them to be licensed for use on public roadways. These are categorized as Dual-sport motorcycles.

== Manufacturers ==
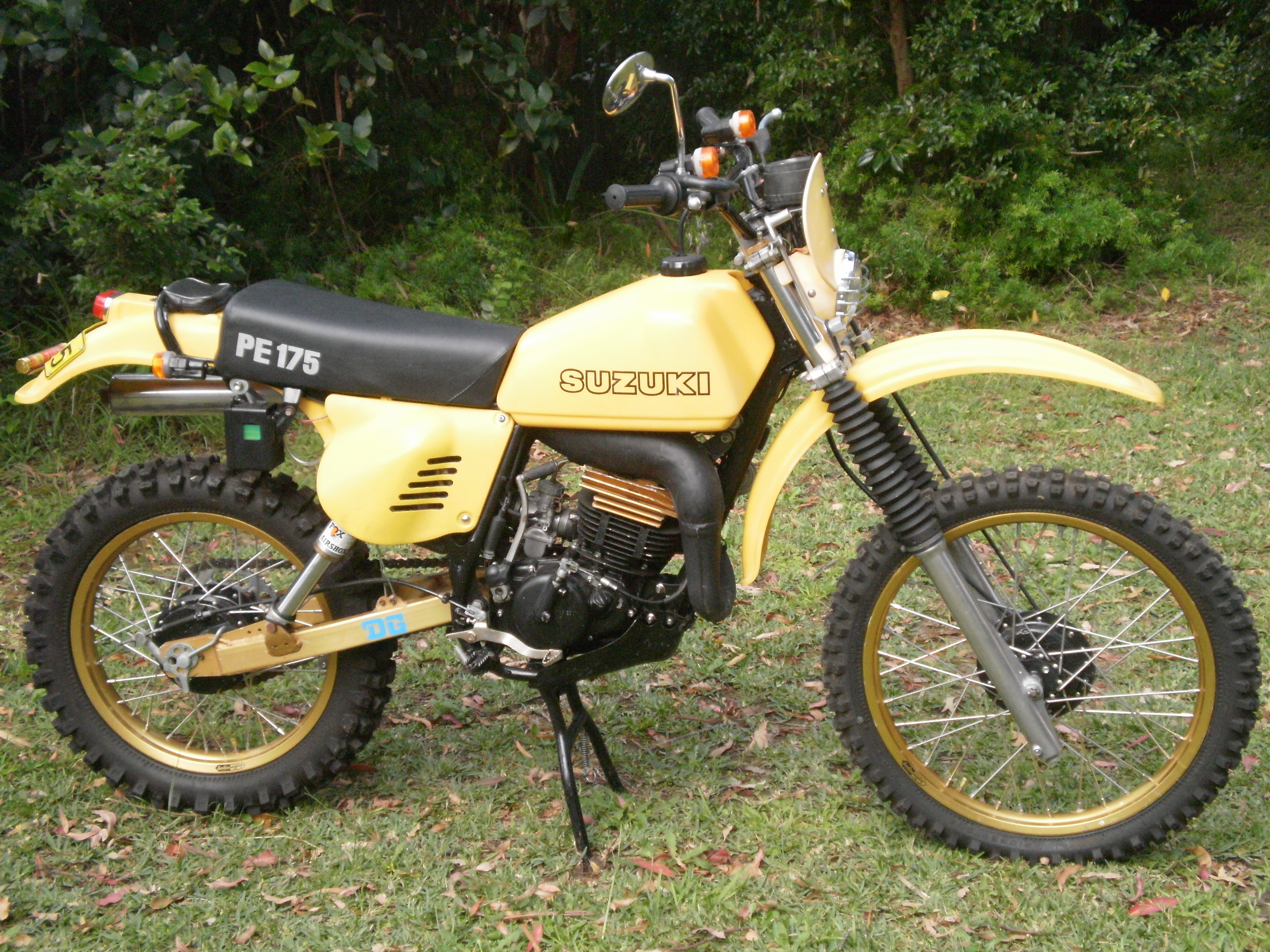
1979 Suzuki PE175 street-legal enduro bike

Past and present enduro manufacturers include AJP, ATK, Beta, Bultaco, CCM, Fantic, Gas Gas, Hodaka, Honda, Husaberg, Husqvarna, Indian, Kawasaki, KTM, Maico, Montesa, MZ, Ossa, Penton, Rieju, Sherco, Suzuki, SWM, Yamaha, Triumph, and Ducati.

== History ==
Motorcycles specifically intended for enduro competition first appeared at the International Six Day Trial (ISDT) now called the International Six Days Enduro (ISDE). The ISDE was first held in 1913 at Carlisle, England. The ISDE requires an enduro motorcycle to withstand over six days and upwards of 1250 km (777 miles) of competition; repairs are limited to those performed by the rider with limited parts. The ISDE has occurred annually, apart from interruptions due to World War I and World War II, at various locations throughout the world. The early events were a test of rider skill and motorcycle reliability. The earliest ISDE courses used the dirt roads common in that era. Today, most of the routes are off-road. In 1980, the ISDT was renamed the International Six Day Enduro (ISDE).

Until 1973, the ISDE was always held in Europe. In 1973 it was held in the United States, and since then it has been held outside Europe more frequently: twice in Australia (1992 and 1998), again in the USA (1994), Brazil (2003), New Zealand (2006) and Chile (2007). The ISDE has attracted national teams from as many as 32 countries in recent years.

In the 1970s the term was used in US marketing applied to dual-purpose motorcycles regardless of their suitability for competition.

In the U.S., enduro motorcycles appeared in light and heavyweight classes during the Greenhorn Enduro hosted by the Pasadena Motorcycle Club (PMC). The Greenhorn Enduro was a nationally recognized 500-mile, two-day desert off-road competition that pounded both rider and machine. Veterans of the early Greenhorn Enduro included Bud Ekins and Steve McQueen.

Many current enduro motorcycles are built along the basic lines of a World Championship (WEC) machine, as used in the World Enduro Championship. The WEC is a time-card enduro, whereby a number of stages are raced in a time trial against the clock over a course of at least 200 km (124 miles) consisting of both paved and unpaved trails and roads (up to 30% of the course may be on public or private asphalted roads).

Another popular type of enduro competition that has spurred enduro motorcycle development is endurocross, a hybrid event combining enduro and supercross.

In the UK, most enduro clubman bikes were 2-strokes, but many ACU events had a separate class for 4-stroke machines, such as the Honda XR series. Such 4-strokes tended to be effectively "sporty trail bikes" rather than de-tuned scramblers, but their much improved fuel economy (compared to 2-strokes) meant that they could complete lengthy laps of thirty miles or more without refuelling. This obviated the need for a back-up team to man refueling stops, allowing 4-stroke clubmen to compete without a support entourage.

== Technical developments ==
MX racing bikes have often been used as platforms for building enduro bikes. This was partially driven by the conversion of MX from 2-stroke to 4-stroke engine designs to comply with regulatory trends, as well as the development of hybrid competition races such as Enduro-X. Compared to MX bikes, enduro and dual-sport bikes traditionally had a much higher proportion of 4-stroke motors. Though powerful, MX-based off-road motorcycles can experience problems running full enduro courses, where an over-emphasis on light weight and high power may cause engine reliability problems when racing over distances that are much longer than an MX circuit.

== Registration requirements for on-road use ==
As some enduro courses have portions on public roads as well as off-road tracks, competitors in such events will need enduro bikes that comply with local registration requirements for on-road use. Modern enduro bikes are closely related to their MX counterparts, and the manufacturers may state that enduro machines are for non-highway use only. Some countries refuse the registration of enduro bikes for on-highway use unless they are altered to meet local road-legal specifications. However, some enduro bikes, such as the Husqvarna TE250 and some Husabergs are built to comply with on-road requirements, and it is fairly straightforward to register these machines for on-road use .
