= San Francisco Motorcycle Club =

- Abbreviation: SFMC
- Founded: 1904
- Founded at: Thor Motorcycles, San Francisco
- Region served: San Francisco, California, USA
- Members: 1904
- Key people: Kalle Hoffman, Tegan Hetzel-Dobbins
- Website: www.sf-mc.org

The San Francisco Motorcycle Club (SFMC) was founded in San Francisco, California in 1904. It has been in continuous operation since its inception. This makes it the second oldest motorcycle club in the United States, preceded only by the Yonkers MC of Yonkers, New York, founded in 1903.

The SFMC has been a member of the American Motorcyclist Association since 1924. Members are not limited to riding any particular make or model of motorcycle and include males and females.

== Interesting facts ==
- San Francisco Mayor P.H. McCarthy was an SFMC member in 1911.
- An SFMC member, Hap Jones, was the first civilian to cross the Golden Gate Bridge upon its completion in 1937. He reenacted this event in 1987 for the 50 Year Anniversary of the famous bridge.

=== Presidents ===
Presidents of the San Francisco Motorcycle Club have included:

- 2002 Frank Morales
- 2003 Frank Morales
- 2004 Dennis Casey
- 2005 Eric Schiller
- 2006 Eric Schiller
- 2007 Chuck Dobbins
- 2008 Tegan Hetzel-Dobbins
- 2009 Stephan Kokinda
- 2010 Bob Young
- 2011 Brian Holm
- 2012 Kalle Hoffman
- 2013 John A. Sweeny
- 2014 Tucker Perry
- 2015 Ben Berliner
- 2016 Ben Berliner
- 2017 Barry Synoground
- 2018 Dennis Casey
- 2019 Darrell Scarlet
- 2020 David Simpson
- 2021 David Simpson
- 2022 Jane Williamson
- 2023 Jane Williamson
