= Julia McNair Wright =

American author

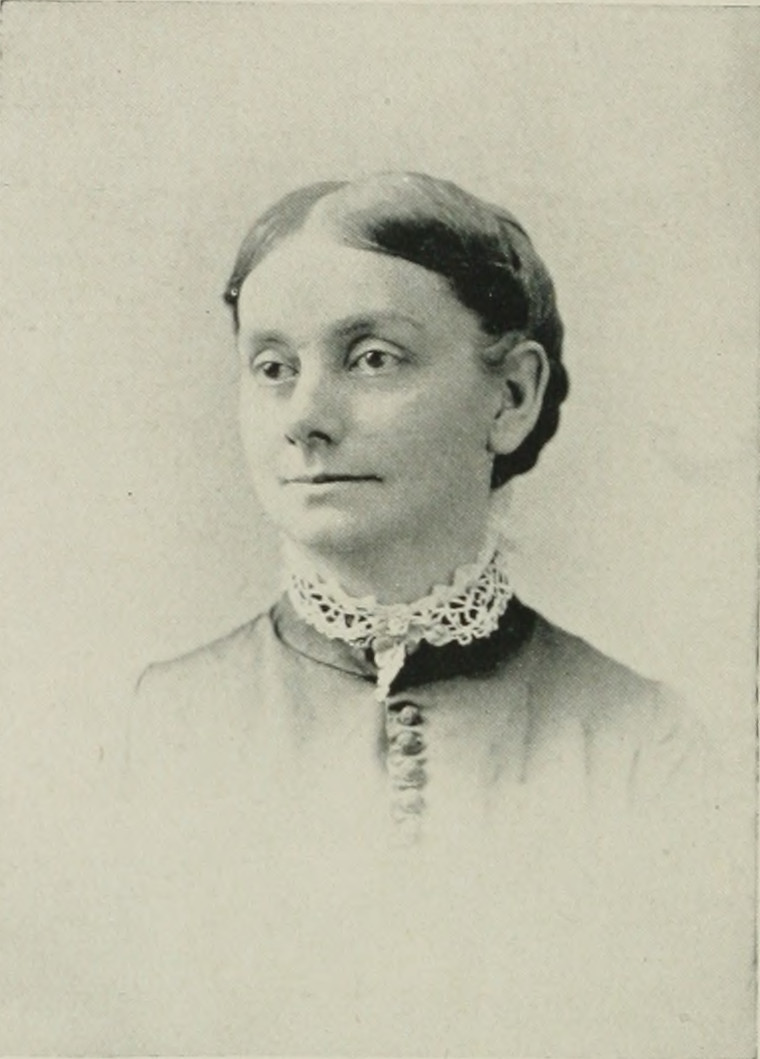
- Photo in A Woman of the Century
- Born: Julia McNair; May 1, 1840; Oswego, New York, U.S.
- Died: September 2, 1903 (aged 63); Philadelphia, Pennsylvania (or Fulton, Missouri), U.S.
- Occupation: Author
- Spouse: William James Wright (m. 1859)
- Writing career
- Language: English

Julia McNair Wright (née McNair; May 1, 1840 – September 2, 1903) was an American writer. She published numerous temperance and anti-Catholic stories, among which were Almost a Nun; Priest and Nun; The Gospel in the Riviera; The Heir of Athole, Scenes of the Convent; A Wife Hard Won; A Million Too Much; The Complete Home; Bricks from Babel. Her scientific stories included, The Sun and His Family; The Story of Plant Life; The Nature Readers, Seaside and Wayside. The Complete Home sold over 100,000 copies. Most of her stories were republished in Europe, in various languages.

== Early life and education ==
Julia McNair was born in Oswego, New York, May 1, 1840. She was the daughter of John McNair, a civil engineer of Scotch descent.

She was educated in private schools and seminaries.

== Career ==
Wright began her literary career at age sixteen by the publication of short stories. Her published works include Almost a Nun (1867); Priest and Nun (1869); Jug-or-Not (1870); Saints and Sinners (1873); The Early Church in Britain (1874); Bricks from Babel, a manual of ethnography (1876); The Complete Home (1879); A Wife Hard Won, a novel (1882).

Julia McNair Wright's The Field Of Fortune or Practical Life is a 626 page tutorial on the value of Common Sense in all of life's pursuits. The volume's themes are presented by a newcomer visiting the general store/post office in Arcadia, a fictional American town. 'The Stranger' expounds on the value of dedication, hard work and familial love, addressing small groups of the town's elders as well as the young folk, with questions asked, answers offered, and comments/retorts welcomed and discussed.

She also produced the four-volume series The Nature Readers (1887–91). Her works were popular. Most of her stories were republished in Europe, in various languages, and several of them appeared in Arabic. Wright never had a book that was a financial failure; all did well. The Complete Home sold over 100,000 copies, and others reached ten, twenty, thirty and fifty thousand. Since the organization of the National Temperance Society, she was one of its most earnest workers and most popular authors. She wrote on historical, nature, ethnographical, theological, and biblical subjects.

She was the main author of Ladies' Home Cook Book: A Complete Cook Book and Manual of Household Duties... Compiled by Julia Mac Nair Wright, et al. (532 pages).

== Personal life ==
In 1859, Wright married Rev. Dr. William James Wright, a mathematician. She had two children. Her son was a businessman; her daughter, Mrs. J. Wright Whitcomb, was an author.

Julia McNair Wright died on September 2, 1903, in Philadelphia, Pennsylvania, or Fulton, Missouri.

== Selected works ==
- George Miller and his mother, 1860
- Mary Reed, 1861
- Blind Annie Lorimer, 1863
- Life and light, or, Every-day religion, 1863
- Biddy Malone : or, The bundle of silk, 1863
- Nannie Barton, 1864
- The cap-makers, 1864
- The little Norwegian, and the young wood-cutter : true stories 1865
- New York Ned, or, Wreck and refuge, 1865
- The path and the lamp 1865
- The convict's family, 1865
- Malcom's cottage and Malcom's friend, 1867
- Old Michael and his little friend, 1867
- The golden heart, 1867
- Mabel and Tura of the Southwest : a tale, 1867
- Shoe-binders of New York, or, The fields white to the harvest, 1867
- The New York needle-woman, or, Elsie's stars, 1868
- The golden fruit, 1868
- The Golden life, 1867
- Richard Knill, 1869
- The Ohio ark; and where it floated, 1869
- The story of a tinker, 1869
- The New York Bible-woman, 1869
- Henry Martyn, 1869
- The little king, 1869
- Three seats full, 1869
- The Indian's friend, 1869
- Our class, 1869
- Story of a prophet, 1869
- Tom Scott, 1869
- Brave Max, 1869
- Good Louise, 1869
- Henry Martyn, 1869
- Priest and nun, 1869
- John Huss, 1870
- Melanchthon, 1870
- A million too much, a temperance tale, 1871
- A made man : a sequel to "The story of Rasmus; or, the making of a man" ...
- Patriot and Tory: One Hundred Years Ago, 1876
- A plain woman's story, 1890
