= Yonkers Motorcycle Club =

- Abbreviation: YMC
- Founded: 1903
- Founder: George Ellis
- Founded at: Yonkers, NY
- Region served: New York, USA
- Website: yonkersmotorcycleclub.net

The Yonkers Motorcycle Club originally started as The Yonkers Bicycle Club and was founded on November 19, 1879. The Yonkers Motorcycle Club was formed in 1903 in Yonkers, New York by President George "Usco " Ellis (later appointed State Commissioner for New York of the Federation of American Motorcyclists in August 1915). The Yonkers Motorcycle Club served as a civil defense messenger service during the earlier part of the 1900s delivering messages to various government officials throughout the country. An article taken from the Boston Daily Globe March 11, 1921, titled Cyclists Return After Call on Vice President, describes the journey that George A. Ellis and Henry E Andrews made when they left Boston on a Sunday morning at 9 o'clock am, bearing a message from Gov.Cox to Vice President Coolidge. They completed their first leg of the journey, a distance of 510 miles, in 22 hours and 45 minutes, arriving in Washington Monday morning. They left Washington at 8' o'clock Tuesday morning, and stopped at Ellis' home, Yonkers, en route to Boston.[3] Since 1924, the club has been chartered by the American Motorcyclist Association. The Yonkers Motorcycle Club is the oldest active motorcycle club in the world.
