= 1905 in the United States =

- Decades: 1880s; 1890s; 1900s; 1910s; 1920s
- See also: History of the United States (1865–1918); Timeline of United States history (1900–1929); List of years in the United States

Events from the year 1905 in the United States.

== Incumbents ==
=== Federal government ===
- President: Theodore Roosevelt (R-New York)
- Vice President:

vacant (until March 4)
Charles W. Fairbanks (R-Indiana) (starting March 4)

- Chief Justice: Melville Fuller (Illinois)
- Speaker of the House of Representatives: Joseph Gurney Cannon (R-Illinois)
- Congress: 58th (until March 4), 59th (starting March 4)

==== State governments ====
Governors and lieutenant governors

=== Governors ===
- Governor of Alabama: William D. Jelks (Democratic)
- Governor of Arkansas: Jeff Davis (Democratic)
- Governor of California: George Pardee (Republican)
- Governor of Colorado:
  - until January 10: James Hamilton Peabody (Republican)
  - January 10-March 17: Alva Adams (Democratic)
  - March 17: James Hamilton Peabody (Republican)
  - starting March 17: Jesse Fuller McDonald (Republican)
- Governor of Connecticut: Abiram Chamberlain (Republican) (until January 4), Henry Roberts (Republican) (starting January 4)
- Governor of Delaware: John Hunn (Republican) (until January 17), Preston Lea (Republican) (starting January 17)
- Governor of Florida: William Sherman Jennings (Democratic) (until January 3), Napoleon B. Broward (Democratic) (starting January 3)
- Governor of Georgia: Joseph M. Terrell (Democratic)
- Governor of Idaho: John T. Morrison (Republican) (until January 2), Frank R. Gooding (Republican) (starting January 2)
- Governor of Illinois: Richard Yates, Jr. (Republican) (until January 9), Charles S. Deneen (Republican) (starting January 9)
- Governor of Indiana: Winfield T. Durbin (Republican) (until January 9), J. Frank Hanly (Republican) (starting January 9)
- Governor of Iowa: Albert B. Cummins (Republican)
- Governor of Kansas: Willis J. Bailey (Republican) (until January 9), Edward W. Hoch (Republican) (starting January 9)
- Governor of Kentucky: J. C. W. Beckham (Democratic)
- Governor of Louisiana: Newton Crain Blanchard (Democratic)
- Governor of Maine: John Fremont Hill (Republican) (until January 4), William T. Cobb (Republican) (starting January 4)
- Governor of Maryland: Edwin Warfield (Democratic)
- Governor of Massachusetts: John L. Bates (Republican) (until January 5), William L. Douglas (Democratic) (starting January 5)
- Governor of Michigan: Aaron T. Bliss (Republican) (until January 1), Fred M. Warner (Republican) (starting January 1)
- Governor of Minnesota: Samuel Rinnah Van Sant (Republican) (until January 4), John A. Johnson (Democratic) (starting January 4)
- Governor of Mississippi: James K. Vardaman (Democratic)
- Governor of Missouri: Alexander Monroe Dockery (Democratic) (until January 9), Joseph W. Folk (Democratic) (starting January 9)
- Governor of Montana: Joseph Toole (Democratic)
- Governor of Nebraska: John H. Mickey (Republican)
- Governor of Nevada: John Sparks (Silver)
- Governor of New Hampshire: Nahum J. Bachelder (Republican) (until January 5), John McLane (Republican) (starting January 5)
- Governor of New Jersey: Franklin Murphy (Republican) (until January 17), Edward C. Stokes (Republican) (starting January 17)
- Governor of New York: Frank W. Higgins (Republican) (starting January 1)
- Governor of North Carolina: Charles Brantley Aycock (Democratic) (until January 11), Robert Broadnax Glenn (Democratic) (starting January 11)
- Governor of North Dakota: Frank White (Republican) (until January 4), Elmore Y. Sarles (Republican) (starting January 4)
- Governor of Ohio: Myron T. Herrick (Republican)
- Governor of Oregon: George Chamberlain (Democratic)
- Governor of Pennsylvania: Samuel W. Pennypacker (Republican)
- Governor of Rhode Island: Lucius F. C. Garvin (Democratic) (until January 4), George H. Utter (Republican) (starting January 4)
- Governor of South Carolina: Duncan Clinch Heyward (Democratic)
- Governor of South Dakota: Charles N. Herreid (Republican) (until January 3), Samuel H. Elrod (Republican) (starting January 3)
- Governor of Tennessee: James B. Frazier (Democratic) (until March 21), John I. Cox (Democratic) (starting March 21)
- Governor of Texas: S. W. T. Lanham (Democratic)
- Governor of Utah: Heber Manning Wells (Republican) (until January 2), John Christopher Cutler (Republican) (starting January 2)
- Governor of Vermont: Charles J. Bell (Republican)
- Governor of Virginia: Andrew Jackson Montague (Democratic)
- Governor of Washington: Henry McBride (Republican) (until January 11), Albert E. Mead (Republican) (starting January 11)
- Governor of West Virginia: Albert B. White (Republican) (until March 4), William M. O. Dawson (Republican) (starting March 4)
- Governor of Wisconsin: Robert M. La Follette, Sr. (Republican)
- Governor of Wyoming: Fenimore Chatterton (Republican) (until January 2), Bryant B. Brooks (Republican) (starting January 2)

=== Lieutenant governors ===
- Lieutenant Governor of Alabama: Russell M. Cunningham (Democratic)
- Lieutenant Governor of California: Alden Anderson (Republican)
- Lieutenant Governor of Colorado:
  - until January 10: Warren A. Haggott (Republican)
  - January 10-March 17: Arthur Cornforth (Republican)
  - March 17: Jesse F. McDonald (Republican)
  - March 17-July 5: Arthur Cornforth (Republican)
  - starting July 5: Fred W. Parks (Republican)
- Lieutenant Governor of Connecticut: Henry Roberts (Republican) (until January 4), Rollin S. Woodruff (Republican) (starting January 4)
- Lieutenant Governor of Delaware: Philip L. Cannon (Republican) (until January 17), Isaac T. Parker (Republican) (starting January 17)
- Lieutenant Governor of Idaho: James M. Stevens (Republican) (until January 2), Burpee L. Steeves (Republican) (starting January 2)
- Lieutenant Governor of Illinois: William Northcott (Republican) (until January 9), Lawrence Sherman (Republican) (starting January 9)
- Lieutenant Governor of Indiana: Newton W. Gilbert (Republican) (until January 9), Hugh T. Miller (Republican) (starting January 9)
- Lieutenant Governor of Iowa: John Herriott (Republican)
- Lieutenant Governor of Kansas: David J. Hanna (Republican)
- Lieutenant Governor of Kentucky: William P. Thorne (Democratic)
- Lieutenant Governor of Louisiana: Jared Y. Sanders, Sr. (Democratic)
- Lieutenant Governor of Massachusetts: Curtis Guild, Jr. (Republican)
- Lieutenant Governor of Michigan: Alexander Maitland (Republican)
- Lieutenant Governor of Minnesota: Ray W. Jones (Republican)
- Lieutenant Governor of Mississippi: John Prentiss Carter (Democratic)
- Lieutenant Governor of Missouri: Thomas Lewis Rubey (Democratic) (until January 9), John C. McKinley (Republican) (starting January 9)
- Lieutenant Governor of Montana: Frank G. Higgins (Democratic) (until October 15), Edwin L. Norris (Democratic) (starting October 15)
- Lieutenant Governor of Nebraska: Edmund G. McGilton (Republican)
- Lieutenant Governor of Nevada: Lemuel Allen (political party unknown)
- Lieutenant Governor of New York: Matthew Linn Bruce (Republican) (starting January 1)
- Lieutenant Governor of North Carolina: Wilfred D. Turner (Democratic) (until January 11), Francis D. Winston (Democratic) (starting January 11)
- Lieutenant Governor of North Dakota: David Bartlett (Republican)
- Lieutenant Governor of Ohio: Warren G. Harding (Republican)
- Lieutenant Governor of Pennsylvania: William M. Brown (Republican)
- Lieutenant Governor of Rhode Island: George H. Utter (Republican) (until January 3), Frederick Jackson (Republican) (starting January 3)
- Lieutenant Governor of South Carolina: John Sloan (Democratic)
- Lieutenant Governor of South Dakota: George W. Snow (Republican) (until January 3), John E. McDougall (Republican) (starting January 3)
- Lieutenant Governor of Tennessee:
  - until month and day unknown: E. T. Seay (Democratic)
  - month and day unknown: John I. Cox (Democratic)
  - starting month and day unknown: Ernest Rice (Democratic)
- Lieutenant Governor of Texas: George D. Neal (Democratic)
- Lieutenant Governor of Vermont: Charles H. Stearns (Republican)
- Lieutenant Governor of Virginia: Joseph Edward Willard (Democratic)
- Lieutenant Governor of Washington: vacant (until January 11), Charles E. Coon (Republican) (starting January 11)
- Lieutenant Governor of Wisconsin: James O. Davidson (Republican)

== Events ==
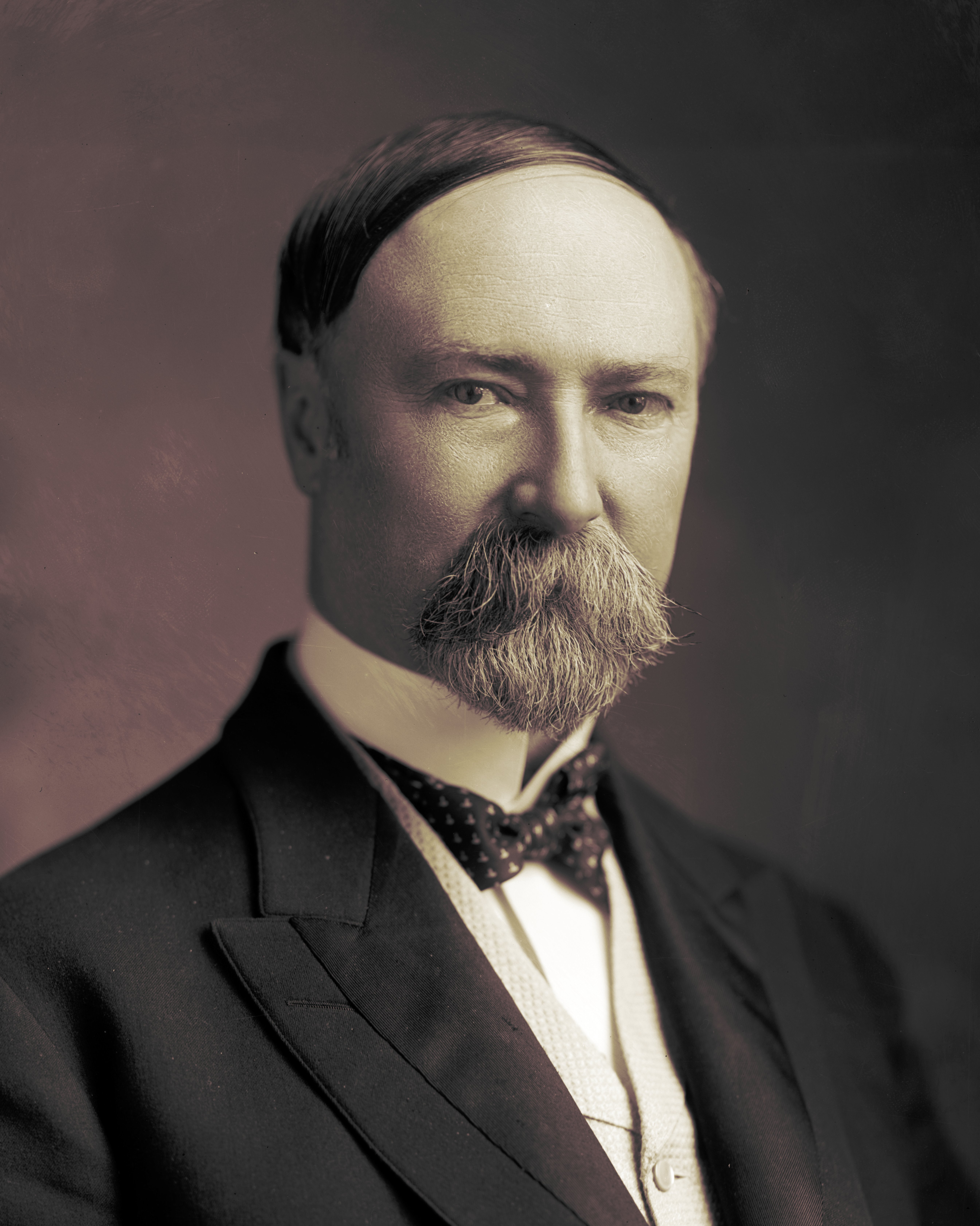
March 4: Charles W. Fairbanks becomes the 26th U.S. vice president

=== January–June ===
- January 6 – The Senate confirms the nomination of William D. Crum, an African-American, to the office of collector of customs at Charleston, South Carolina after Crum's nomination by President Theodore Roosevelt.
- January 30 – The Supreme Court renders its unanimous decision in the landmark case of Swift & Co. v. United States, allowing the federal government to regulate monopolies.
- March 4 – President Theodore Roosevelt begins his first full term. Charles W. Fairbanks is sworn in as Vice President of the United States.
- March 10 – In Cleveland, Ohio, Cassie Chadwick is sentenced for 14 years in prison for fraud.
- March 17 – Franklin D. Roosevelt marries his fifth cousin Eleanor Roosevelt; President Roosevelt, the bride's uncle, gives her away.
- March 20 – Grover Shoe Factory disaster: A boiler explosion, building collapse and fire in Brockton, Massachusetts kills 58.
- March 24 – Toastmasters International is founded by Ralph C. Smedley in Bloomington, Illinois.
- March 27 – Plumas National Forest is established.
- April 6 – Lochner v. New York: The Supreme Court of the United States invalidates New York's 8-hour-day law.
- April 6–July 19 – The 1905 Chicago Teamsters' strike; 21 people die and 416 are injured in the violence.
- May–June – John C. Merriam leads the Saurian Expedition, a paleontological research mission in northern Nevada.
- May 2-- Establishment of the first state police force in Pennsylvania
- May 6 – Klamath National Forest is established.
- May 10 – The 1905 Snyder, Oklahoma tornado destroys much of Snyder, Oklahoma, killing at least 97.
- May 12 – Gunnison National Forest is established.
- May 15 – Las Vegas, Nevada is founded when 110 acres (45 ha), in what later becomes downtown, are auctioned off.
- May 15 – Saint Tikhon's Orthodox Monastery is founded in South Canaan Township in western Wayne County, in the northeastern corner of Pennsylvania.
- May 29 – Sawtooth National Forest is established.
- June 1–October 14 – The Lewis and Clark Centennial Exposition is held in Portland, Oregon, celebrating the 100th anniversary of the Lewis and Clark Expedition.
- June 2 – Lassen National Forest is established.
- June 3 – San Juan and Payette National Forest is established.
- June 14 – Uncompahgre National Forest is established.
- June 24 – The founding convention of the Industrial Workers of the World, A radical workers union, which had great impact during the first two decades of the 20th century.

=== July–December ===
September 5: Treaty of Portsmouth

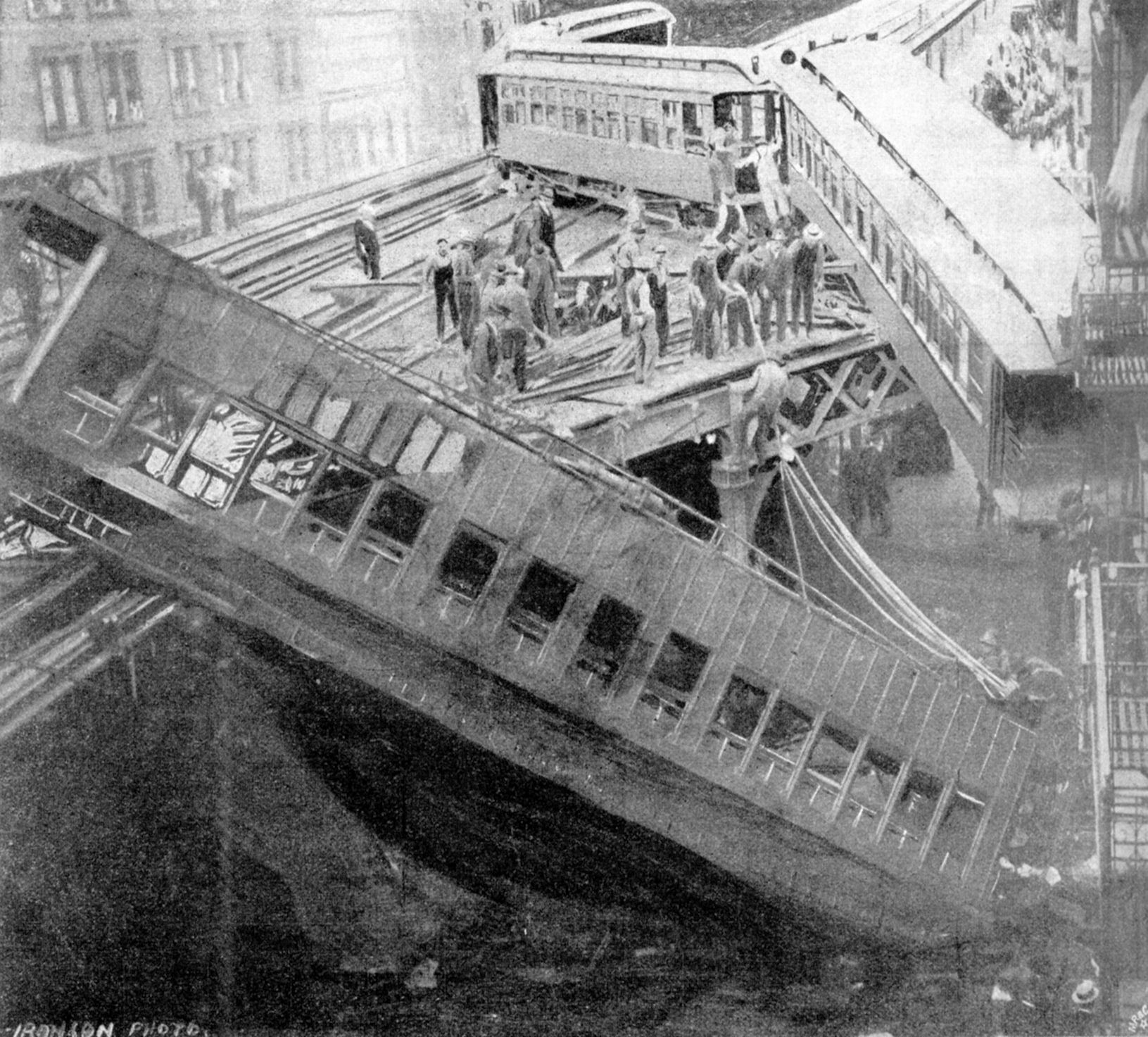
September 11: Ninth Avenue derailment

- July 11 – W. E. B. Du Bois and William Monroe Trotter establish the Niagara Movement, a precursor to the NAACP.
- July 22 – Florence Kelly delivers her landmark speech about child labor before the convention of the National American Woman Suffrage Association in Philadelphia.
- July 29 – U.S. Secretary of War William Howard Taft has talks with Prime Minister of Japan Katsura Taro. Notes from these conversations (known as the Taft–Katsura Agreement) are later found in 1924 and cause a controversy as it appears to contain U.S. recognition of Japan's claims in Korea.
- August 15 – Mexican-American prospector Pablo Valencia gets lost in the Sonoran Desert of Arizona with no water. Enduring almost eight days of dehydration, Valencia wanders until he is discovered on August 23 by anthropologist William J. McGee and McGee's Papago Indian assistant, Jose.
- August 21 – The Sequoyah Constitutional Convention takes place in Muskogee in the U.S. Indian Territory and approves a constitution for the proposed State of Sequoyah, seeking admission as the only Native American majority state in the U.S. President Roosevelt will reject the idea in favor of joining the Indian Territory with the white-ruled Oklahoma Territory to create the 46th U.S. state.
- August 23 – A. Roy Knabenshue introduces the dirigible to the skies of New York City, piloting the lighter-than-air vehicle within view of hundreds of thousands of spectators.
- September 5 – Russo-Japanese War – Treaty of Portsmouth: In New Hampshire, a treaty mediated by U.S. President Theodore Roosevelt is signed by victor Japan and Russia. Russia cedes the island of Sakhalin and port and rail rights in Manchuria to Japan.
- September 11 – 19 die and 48 are seriously injured when the Ninth Avenue Elevated train derails in Manhattan.
- October – John W. Taylor and Matthias F. Cowley resign from the Quorum of Twelve in protest, disputing the Church of Jesus Christ of Latter-day Saints' stance against polygamy that was reaffirmed in the Second Manifesto (following the Reed Smoot hearings).
- October 3 – Tonto National Forest is established.
- October 5 – The Wright Brothers' third aeroplane (Wright Flyer III) stays in the air for 39 minutes with Wilbur piloting. This is the first aeroplane flight lasting over half an hour.
- October 11 – The Institute of Musical Art, predecessor of the Juilliard School, opens in New York City.
- October 14 – The National League's New York Giants win baseball's World Series, beating the American League's Philadelphia Athletics, 2-0, in Game 5.
- November 28–29 – The massive Mataafa Storm on the Great Lakes damages or destroys 29 vessels.
- December 24 – The opera The Sho-Gun, authored by George Ade and Gustav Luders, is performed at the Grand Opera House in Seattle, Washington.
- December 30 – A bomb kills Frank Steunenberg, ex-governor of Idaho; the case leads to a trial against leaders of the Western Federation of Miners.

=== Undated ===
- Refilling of Salton Sea begins.
- Huckleberry Finn and Tom Sawyer are banned from the Brooklyn Public Library for setting a "bad example."

=== Ongoing ===
- Progressive Era (1890s–1920s)
- Lochner era (c. 1897–c. 1937)
- Black Patch Tobacco Wars (1904–1909)

== Sport ==
- May 29 - Brooklyn Superbas pitcher Elmer Stricklett introduces the "spitball" to major league baseball.
- October 14 - The National League's New York Giants won their 1st World Series by defeating the American League's Philadelphia Athletics 4 games to 1 New York City's Polo Grounds

== Births ==
- January 3 – Anna May Wong, film actress (died 1961)
- January 7
  - Sterling Holloway, actor (died 1992)
  - James Simpson Jr., race car driver and politician (died 1960)
- January 11 – Dorothy Hale, socialite (suicide 1938)
- January 19 – Oveta Culp Hobby, government official and businesswoman (died 1995)
- January 24 – J. Howard Marshall, billionaire businessman (died 1995)
- January 27 – Howard McNear, actor (died 1969)
- February 6 – Merze Tate, African American academic (died 1996)
- February 10
  - Walter A. Brown, basketball and ice hockey pioneer (died 1964)
  - Chick Webb, drummer and bandleader (died 1939)
- March 15 – Nat Perrin, comedy screenwriter (died 1998)
- March 17 – Lillian Yarbo, actress (died 1996)
- March 18 – Thomas Townsend Brown, inventor (died 1985)
- April 9 – J. William Fulbright, U.S. Senator from Arkansas from 1945 to 1974 (died 1995)
- May 11 – Catherine Bauer Wurster, architect and public housing advocate (died 1964)
- May 15 – Joseph Cotten, actor (died 1994)
- May 16 – Henry Fonda, actor (died 1982)
- May 17 – Roy Nelson, cartoonist (died 1956)
- May 18
  - Ruth Alexander, pilot (died 1930)
  - Cecilia H. Hauge, nurse (died 1990)
- June 10 – Sally Childs, language training specialist (died 1988)
- June 14 – Arthur Davis, American animator (died 2000)
- June 20 – Lillian Hellman, playwright (died 1984)
- June 24 – Fred Alderman, Olympic sprinter (died 1998)
- June 25 – Leon deValinger Jr., archivist and historian (died 2000)
- June 29 – Tarzan Woltzen, basketball player (died 1995)
- June 30
  - John Harmon, actor (died 1985)
  - John Van Ryn, tennis player (died 1999)
- July 4 – Irving Johnson, sailor and author (died 1991)
- July 10 – Thomas Gomez, actor (died 1971)
- July 11 – David Louis Lidman, writer (died 1982)
- July 12 – Edward Bernds, screenwriter and film director (died 2000)
- July 13 – Magda Foy, child actress (died 2000)
- July 15
  - Dorothy Fields, lyricist (died 1974)
  - Addie McPhail, actress (died 2003)
  - Shirley Povich, sports columnist (died 1998)
- July 16 – Lou Garland, baseball player (died 1990)
- July 18 – Robert Elton Brooker, business executive (died 2000)
- July 20 – Joseph Levis, Olympic fencer (died 2005)
- July 21
  - David M. Kennedy, U.S. 60th Secretary of Treasury, 8th U.S. Representative to N.A.T.O., Special Representative of The First Presidency of The Church of Jesus Christ and Latter-day Saints (died 1996)
  - Diana Trilling, literary critic and author (died 1996)
- July 22 – Doc Cramer, baseball player (died 1990)
- July 26 – Alex Radcliffe, baseball player (d. 1983)
- July 31 – Robert A. Grant, judge (died 1998)
- August 2 – Ruth Nelson, actress (died 1992)
- August 21 – Friz Freleng, animator, cartoonist, director, producer, and composer (died 1995)
- August 23 – Abbie Rowe, White House photographer (died 1967)
- August 26 – Helen Sharsmith, biologist and educator (died 1982)
- August 29 – Al Taliaferro, Disney comics artist (died 1969)
- September 1 – Elvera Sanchez, dancer (died 2000)
- September 20 – Reinhold O. Carlson, politician (died 2006)
- October 5 – John Hoyt, actor, editorial board member of The Yale Record (died 1991)
- October 6 – Helen Wills, tennis player (died 1998)
- October 7 – Andy Devine, character actor (died 1977)
- October 11 – Fred Trump, real estate developer, father of Donald Trump (died 1999)
- October 23 – Gertrude Ederle, swimmer (died 2003)
- November 1 – Eric Siday, bandleader, electronic composer (died 1976)
- November 3 – Joseph H. Ball, U.S. Senator from Minnesota from 1940 to 1942 and 1943 to 1949 (died 1993)
- November 4 – Nannie Doss, serial killer who murdered eleven people (died 1965)
- November 13 – Frank Levingston, supercentenarian (died 2016)
- November 19
  - Eleanor Audley, actress (died 1991)
  - Tommy Dorsey, bandleader (died 1956)
- November 26 – Bob Johnson, baseball player (died 1982)
- November 27 – Astrid Allwyn, actress (died 1978)
- December 7 – Leonard Goldenson, television executive (died 1999)
- December 19 – Irving Kahn, financial analyst and investor (died 2015)
- December 22 – Kenneth Rexroth, poet (died 1982)
- December 23 – Paul Caraway, general, High Commissioner, United States Civil Administration of the Ryukyu Islands (died 1985)
- December 24 – Howard Hughes, business magnate, investor, director, pilot, and philanthropist (died 1976)

== Deaths ==
- January 2 – Clara Augusta Jones Trask, dime novelist (born 1839)
- January 6
  - Ann Eliza Smith, patriot (born 1819)
  - George Van Cleaf, swimmer and water polo player (born 1880)
- January 19 – Benjamin F. Rice, U.S. Senator from Arkansas from 1868 to 1873 (born 1828)
- January 22 – Clara Harrison Stranahan, college co-founder and trustee (born 1831)
- January 27 – Watson Heston, cartoonist (born 1846)
- January 28 – Cordelia A. Greene, physician, reformer, benefactor (born 1831)
- February 8 – John Leary, politician, 37th Mayor of Seattle (born 1837)
- February 15 – Lew Wallace, Union general in the American Civil War and politician (born 1827)
- February 20 – Jeremiah W. Farnham, merchant captain (born c. 1828)
- February 27 – George S. Boutwell, U.S. Senator from Massachusetts from 1851 to 1853 (born 1818)
- March 1 – Edward O. Wolcott, U.S. Senator from Colorado from 1889 to 1901 (born 1848)
- March 6 – John Henninger Reagan, U.S. Senator from Texas, Acting Confederate States Secretary of the Treasury, Confederate States Postmaster General (born 1818)
- March 9 – William B. Bate, 23rd Governor of Tennessee from 1883 to 1887 and U.S. Senator from Tennessee from 1887 to 1905 (born 1826)
- March 18 – Joseph Roswell Hawley, U.S. Senator from Connecticut from 1881 to 1905 (born 1826)
- April 21 – Orville H. Platt, U.S. Senator from Connecticut from 1879 to 1905 (born 1827)
- April 28 – Fitzhugh Lee, 40th Governor of Virginia, U.S. Army general, Confederate cavalry general (born 1835)
- May 5 – William M. Robbins, U.S. Representative from North Carolina (born 1828)
- May 12 – Sam S. Shubert, theater owner (born 1878)
- May 23 – Mary Livermore, journalist, abolitionist and women's rights advocate (born 1820)
- July 1 – John Hay, author, biographer and 37th United States Secretary of State (born 1838)
- July 24 – Adolf Cluss, engineer architect (born 1825 in Germany)
- August 1 – Andrew Wylie, judge (born 1814)
- August 21 – Mary Mapes Dodge, children's author (b. 1831)
- September 5 – Touch the Clouds, Minneconjou chief (b. c. 1838)
- September 12 – John Rogan, second tallest person in recorded history (b. 1868)
- October 6 – Hibbard H. Shedd, politician and novelist (born 1847)
- December 3 – John Bartlett, lexicographer and publisher (born 1820)

== See also ==
- List of American films of 1905
- Timeline of United States history (1900–1929)
