= 1864 in the United States =

- Decades: 1840s; 1850s; 1860s; 1870s; 1880s
- See also: History of the United States (1849–1865); Timeline of United States history (1860–1899); List of years in the United States

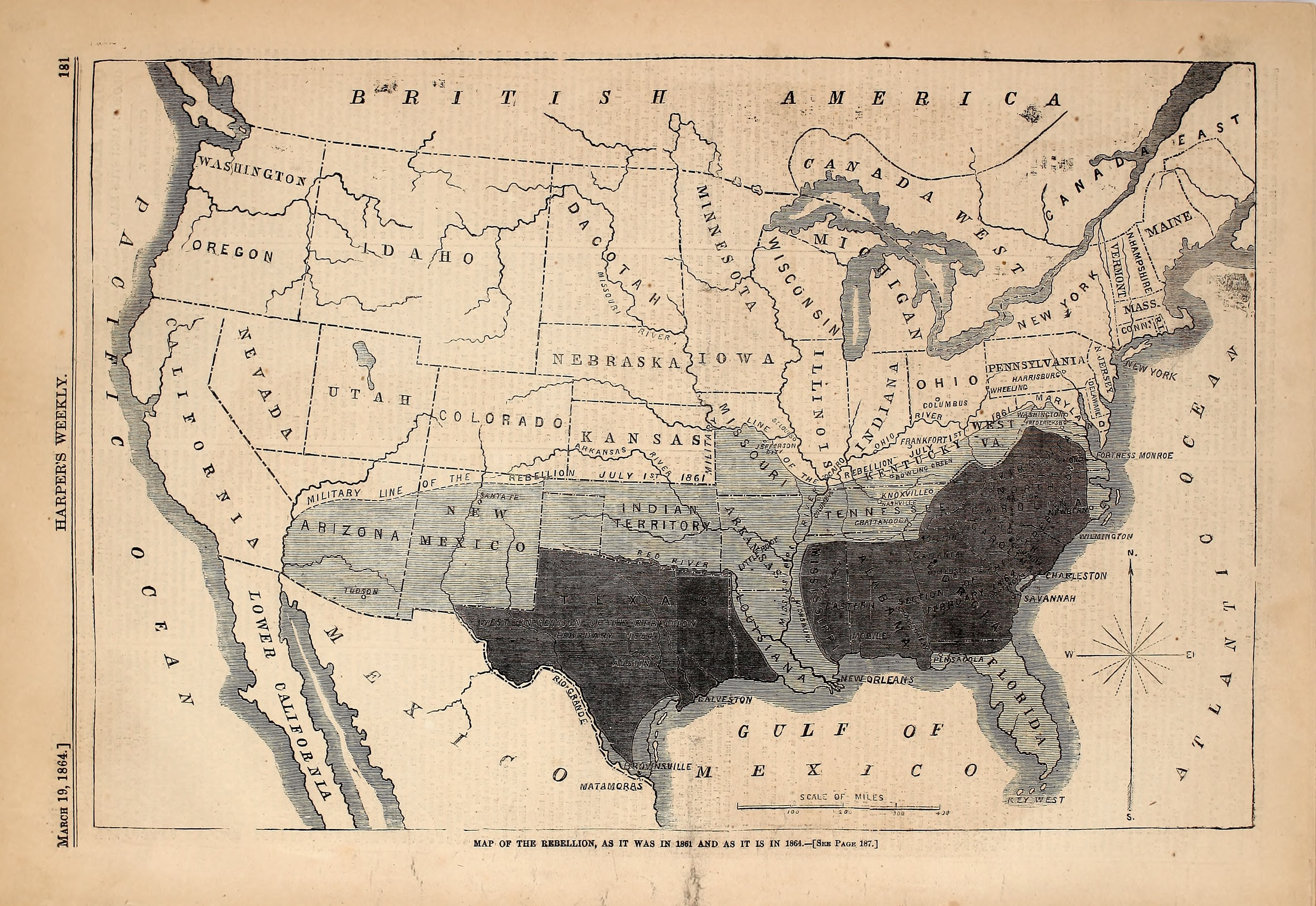
"Map of the rebellion as it was in 1861 and as it is now" depicts the consequences for the Confederacy of the seizure of Memphis in 1862 and the fall of Vicksburg in 1863 (Harper's Weekly, March 19, 1864)

Events from the year 1864 in the United States.

== Incumbents ==
=== Federal government ===
- President: Abraham Lincoln (R-Illinois)
- Vice President: Hannibal Hamlin (R-Maine)
- Chief Justice:

Roger B. Taney (Maryland) (until October 12)
Salmon P. Chase (Ohio) (starting December 15)

- Speaker of the House of Representatives: Schuyler Colfax (R-Indiana)
- Congress: 38th

==== State governments ====
Governors and lieutenant governors

=== Governors ===
- Governor of Alabama: Thomas H. Watts (Democratic)
- Governor of Arkansas: Harris Flanagin (Democratic)
- Governor of California: Frederick Low (Republican)
- Governor of Connecticut: William A. Buckingham (Republican)
- Governor of Delaware: William Cannon (Republican)
- Governor of Florida: John Milton (Democratic)
- Governor of Georgia: Joseph E. Brown (Democratic)
- Governor of Illinois: Richard Yates (Republican)
- Governor of Indiana: Oliver P. Morton (Republican)
- Governor of Iowa: Samuel J. Kirkwood (Republican) (until January 14), William M. Stone (Republican) (starting January 14)
- Governor of Kansas: Thomas Carney (Republican)
- Governor of Kentucky: Thomas E. Bramlette (Democratic)
- Governor of Louisiana: Thomas Overton Moore (Democratic) (until January 25), Henry Watkins Allen (Democratic) (starting January 25)
- Governor of Maine: Abner Coburn (Republican) (until January 6), Samuel Cony (Republican) (starting January 6)
- Governor of Maryland: Augustus Bradford (Union)
- Governor of Massachusetts: John Albion Andrew (Republican)
- Governor of Michigan: Austin Blair (Republican)
- Governor of Minnesota: Henry A. Swift (Republican) (until January 11), Stephen Miller (Republican) (starting January 11)
- Governor of Mississippi: Charles Clark (Democratic)
- Governor of Missouri: Hamilton Rowan Gamble (Republican) (until January 31), William Preble Hall (Republican) (starting January 31)
- Governor of Nevada: James W. Nye (Republican) (until December 5), Henry G. Blasdel (Republican) (starting December 5)
- Governor of New Hampshire: Joseph A. Gilmore (Republican)
- Governor of New Jersey: Joel Parker (Democratic)
- Governor of New York: Horatio Seymour (Democratic) (until end of December 31)
- Governor of North Carolina: Zebulon Baird Vance (Conservative)
- Governor of Ohio: David Tod (Republican) (until January 11), John Brough (Republican) (starting January 11)
- Governor of Oregon: A. C. Gibbs (Republican)
- Governor of Pennsylvania: Andrew Gregg Curtin (Republican)
- Governor of Rhode Island: James Y. Smith (Republican)
- Governor of South Carolina: Milledge Luke Bonham (Democratic) (until December 18), Andrew Gordon Magrath (Democratic) (starting December 18)
- Governor of Tennessee: Andrew Johnson (Union)
- Governor of Texas: Pendleton Murrah (Democratic)
- Governor of Vermont: J. Gregory Smith (Republican)
- Governor of Virginia: John Letcher (Democratic) (until January 1), William Smith (Democratic) (starting January 1)
- Governor of West Virginia: Arthur I. Boreman (Republican)
- Governor of Wisconsin: Edward Salomon (Republican) (until January 4), James T. Lewis (Republican) (starting January 4)

=== Lieutenant governors ===
- Lieutenant Governor of Arkansas: Calvin C. Bliss (Republican) (starting April 18)
- Lieutenant Governor of California: Tim N. Machin (Republican)
- Lieutenant Governor of Connecticut: Roger Averill (Republican)
- Lieutenant Governor of Illinois: Francis Hoffmann (Republican)
- Lieutenant Governor of Indiana: Paris C. Dunning (Democratic)
- Lieutenant Governor of Iowa: John R. Needham (Republican) (until January 14), Enoch W. Eastman (Republican) (starting January 14)
- Lieutenant Governor of Kansas: Thomas Andrew Osborn (Republican)
- Lieutenant Governor of Kentucky: Richard Taylor Jacob (Democratic) (until month and day unknown), vacant (starting month and day unknown)
- Lieutenant Governor of Louisiana: Henry M. Hyams (Democratic) (until month and day unknown), Benjamin W. Pearce (Republican) (starting month and day unknown)
- Lieutenant Governor of Massachusetts: Joel Hayden (Republican)
- Lieutenant Governor of Michigan: Charles S. May (Republican)
- Lieutenant Governor of Minnesota: vacant (until January 11), Charles D. Sherwood (Republican) (starting January 11)
- Lieutenant Governor of Missouri: William Preble Hall (Republican) (until January 31), vacant (starting January 31)
- Lieutenant Governor of Nevada: John S. Crosman (Republican) (starting December 5)
- Lieutenant Governor of New York: David R. Floyd-Jones (Democratic) (until end of December 31)
- Lieutenant Governor of Ohio: Benjamin Stanton (Republican) (until January 11), Charles Anderson (Republican) (starting January 11)
- Lieutenant Governor of Rhode Island: Seth Padelford (Republican)
- Lieutenant Governor of South Carolina:
  - until January 25: Plowden Weston (Democratic)
  - January 25-December 18: vacant
  - starting December 18: Robert McCaw (Democratic)
- Lieutenant Governor of Texas: Fletcher Stockdale (Democratic)
- Lieutenant Governor of Vermont: Paul Dillingham (Republican)
- Lieutenant Governor of Virginia: Robert Latane Montague (no political party) (until January 1), Samuel Price (Democratic) (starting January 1)
- Lieutenant Governor of Wisconsin:
  - until January 4: Edward Salomon (Republican)
  - January 4-13: vacant
  - starting January 13: Wyman Spooner (Republican)

== Events ==
=== January ===
- January – Long Walk of the Navajo: Bands of Navajo led by the U.S. Army are relocated from their traditional lands in eastern Arizona Territory and western New Mexico Territory to Fort Sumner in the Pecos River valley. At least 200 died along the 300-mile (480 km) trek that took over 18 days to travel on foot.
- January 13 – Songwriter Stephen Foster ("Oh! Susanna", "Old Folks at Home") dies aged 37 in New York City leaving a scrap of paper reading "Dear friends and gentle hearts". His parlor song "Beautiful Dreamer" is published in March.

=== February ===
- February 9 – American Civil War: Libby Prison escape: 109 Union soldiers escape from the Confederate prison in Richmond, Virginia, 59 making it back to their home territory.
- February 17 – American Civil War: The Confederate submarine Hunley torpedoes the USS Housatonic, becoming the first submarine to sink an enemy ship (the sub and her crew of 8 are also lost).
- February 20 – American Civil War: The Union suffers one of its costliest defeats at the Battle of Olustee near Lake City, Florida.
- February 25 – American Civil War: The first Northern prisoners arrive at the Confederate prison at Andersonville, Georgia (the 500 prisoners had left Richmond, Virginia, 7 days before).

=== March ===
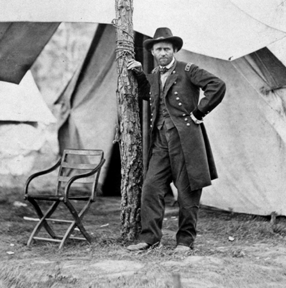
March 9: Ulysses S. Grant commands all Union armies

- March 9 – American Civil War: President Abraham Lincoln appoints Ulysses S. Grant commander in chief of all Union armies.
- March 10 – American Civil War: The Red River Campaign begins as Union troops reach Alexandria, Louisiana.

=== April ===
- April 12 – American Civil War: Fort Pillow massacre – Confederate forces under general Nathan Bedford Forrest kill most of the African American soldiers that surrender at Fort Pillow, Tennessee.
- April 22 – The U.S. Congress passes the Coinage Act of 1864 which mandates that the inscription "In God We Trust" be placed on all coins minted as United States currency.
- April 30 – American Civil War: Confederate forces led by General E. Kirby Smith attack federal troops retreating across the Saline River at Jenkins' Ferry, Arkansas.

=== May ===
- May – Man and Nature: or, Physical geography as modified by human action by George Perkins Marsh is published. One of the first works to document the effects of human action on the environment and it helped to launch the modern conservation movement.
- May 5 – American Civil War: The Battle of the Wilderness begins in Spotsylvania County, Virginia.
- May 7 – American Civil War: The Army of the Potomac, under General Ulysses S. Grant, breaks off from the Battle of the Wilderness and moves southwards.
- May 8–21 – American Civil War: Battle of Spotsylvania Court House: Some 4,000 die in an inconclusive engagement.
- May 11 – American Civil War: Battle of Yellow Tavern: Confederate General J. E. B. Stuart is mortally wounded at Yellow Tavern, Virginia.
- May 12 – American Civil War: Battle of Spotsylvania Court House: The "Bloody Angle" – thousands of Union and Confederate soldiers die.
- May 13 – American Civil War: Battle of Resaca: The battle begins with Union General Sherman fighting toward Atlanta.
- May 18 – Civil War gold hoax: The New York World and the New York Journal of Commerce publish a fake proclamation that President Abraham Lincoln has issued a draft of 400,000 more soldiers.
- May 20 – American Civil War: Battle of Ware Bottom Church: In the Virginia Bermuda Hundred Campaign, 10,000 troops fight in this Confederate victory.
- May 26 – Montana Territory is organized out of parts of Washington Territory and Dakota Territory, and is signed into law by President Abraham Lincoln.

=== June ===
- June 5 – American Civil War: Battle of Piedmont: Union forces under General David Hunter defeat a Confederate army at Piedmont, Augusta County, Virginia, taking nearly 1,000 prisoners.
- June 9 – American Civil War: The Siege of Petersburg begins. Union forces under General Grant and troops led by Confederate General Robert E. Lee battle for the last time.
- June 10
  - American Civil War: Battle of Noonday Creek near Kennesaw, Georgia.
  - American Civil War: Battle of Brice's Crossroads: Confederate troops under Nathan Bedford Forrest defeat a much larger Union force led by General Samuel D. Sturgis in Mississippi.
- June 12 – American Civil War: Battle of Cold Harbor: General Ulysses S. Grant pulls his troops from their positions at Cold Harbor, Virginia and moves south.
- June 15 – Arlington National Cemetery is established when 200 acres (0.8 km^{2}) of the grounds of Robert E. Lee's home Arlington House are officially set-aside as a military cemetery by U.S. Secretary of War Edwin M. Stanton.
- June 27 – American Civil War: Battle of Kennesaw Mountain near Kennesaw, Georgia.
- June 30 – President Abraham Lincoln signs the Yosemite Grant Act, precursor to Yosemite National Park.

=== July ===
- July – President Abraham Lincoln signs a law that abolishes the commutation fee that could be paid to in lieu of conscription.
- July 20 – American Civil War: Battle of Peachtree Creek: Near Atlanta, Georgia, Confederate forces led by General John Bell Hood unsuccessfully attack Union troops under General William T. Sherman.
- July 22 – American Civil War: Battle of Atlanta: Outside of Atlanta, Georgia, Confederate General Hood leads an unsuccessful attack on Union troops under General Sherman on Bald Hill.
- July 24 – American Civil War: Battle of Kernstown: Confederate General Jubal Early defeats Union troops led by General George Crook in an effort to keep the Yankees out of the Shenandoah Valley.
- July 28 – American Civil War: Battle of Ezra Church: Confederate troops led by General Hood make a third unsuccessful attempt to drive Union forces under General Sherman from Atlanta, Georgia.
- July 30 – American Civil War: Battle of the Crater: Union forces attempt to break Confederate lines by exploding a large bomb under their trenches.

=== August ===
- August 1 – The Elgin Watch Company is founded in Elgin, Illinois.
- August 5 – American Civil War: Battle of Mobile Bay: At Mobile Bay near Mobile, Alabama, Admiral David Farragut leads a Union flotilla through Confederate defenses and seals one of the last major Southern ports.
- August 18 – American Civil War: Battle of Globe Tavern: Forces under Union General Ulysses S. Grant try to cut a vital Confederate supply-line into Petersburg, Virginia, by attacking the Wilmington and Weldon Railroad, forcing the Confederates to use wagons.
- August 31 – American Civil War: Union forces led by General William T. Sherman launch an assault on Atlanta, Georgia.

=== September ===
- September 1 – American Civil War: Confederate General Hood evacuates Atlanta after a 4-month siege mounted by Union General Sherman.
- September 2 – American Civil War: Union forces under General Sherman enter Atlanta a day after the Confederate defenders fled the city.
- September 8 – American Civil War: Atlanta, Georgia is evacuated on orders of Union General William Tecumseh Sherman.

=== October ===
- October 2 – American Civil War: Battle of Saltville: Union forces attack Saltville, Virginia but are defeated by Confederate troops.
- October 9 – American Civil War: Battle of Tom's Brook: Union cavalrymen in the Shenandoah Valley defeat Confederate forces at Tom's Brook, Virginia.
- October 15 – American Civil War: Battle of Glasgow, Missouri: Confederate forces take the town.
- October 19 – American Civil War: Battle of Cedar Creek: Union forces under Philip Sheridan defeat a surprise Confederate attack although incurring nearly twice as many casualties, ending the Shenandoah Valley Campaigns of 1864.
- October 25 – American Civil War: Battle of Mine Creek: the second largest cavalry engagement of the war, two divisions of Major General Sterling Price's Army of Missouri are routed by two Federal brigades under the command of Colonels Frederick Benteen and John Finis Philips.
- October 28 – American Civil War:
  - Second Battle of Fair Oaks: Union forces under General Ulysses S. Grant withdraw from Fair Oaks, Virginia, after failing to breach the Confederate defenses around Richmond, Virginia.
  - Second Battle of Newtonia: Union forces defeat the remnants of Price's Missouri Expedition.
- October 30 – Helena, Montana is founded after four prospectors (the so-called Four Georgians) discover gold at Last Chance Gulch; it is their last and agreed final attempt at weeks of trying to find gold in the northern Rockies.
- October 31 – Nevada is admitted as the 36th U.S. state (see History of Nevada).

=== November ===
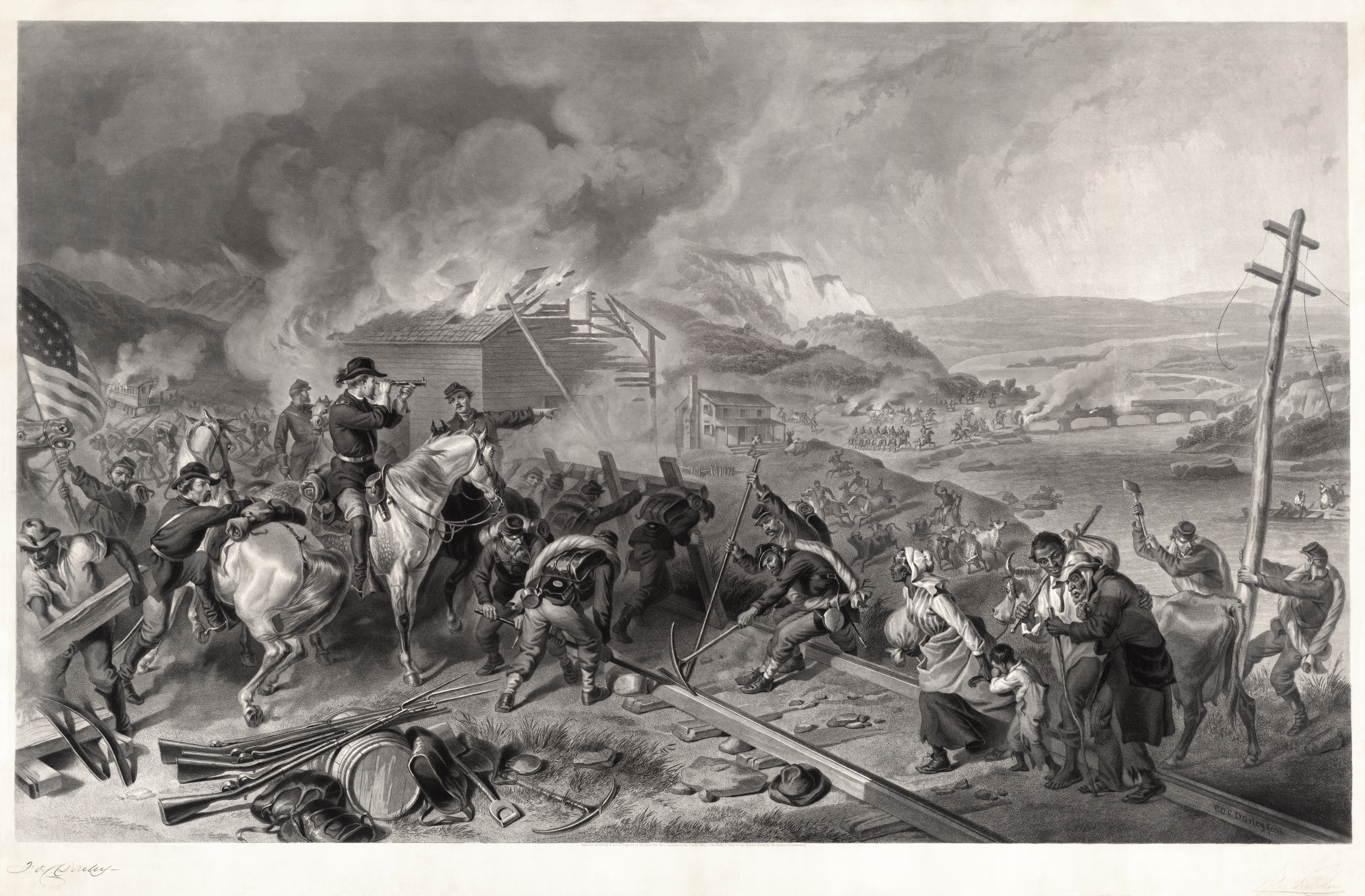
November 15–December 21: Sherman's March to the Sea

- November 4 – American Civil War: Battle of Johnsonville: At Johnsonville, Tennessee, troops under the command of Confederate General Nathan Bedford Forrest bombard a Union supply base with artillery and destroy millions of dollars in material.
- November 7 – The capital of Idaho Territory is moved from Lewiston to Boise; North Idaho declares the move illegal and proposes secession.
- November 8 – 1864 United States presidential election: Abraham Lincoln is reelected in an overwhelming victory over George B. McClellan.
- November 15 – American Civil War: Sherman's March to the Sea begins: Union General Sherman burns Atlanta and starts to move south, causing extensive devastation to crops and mills and living off the land.
- November 22 – American Civil War: Sherman's March to the Sea: Confederate General John Bell Hood invades Tennessee in an unsuccessful attempt to draw Union General Sherman from Georgia.
- November 25 – American Civil War: A group of Confederate operatives calling themselves the Confederate Army of Manhattan starts fires in more than 20 locations in an unsuccessful attempt to burn down New York City.
- November 29 – Indian Wars – Sand Creek Massacre: Colorado volunteers led by Colonel John Chivington massacre at least 400 Cheyenne and Arapahoe noncombatants at Sand Creek, Colorado (where they had been given permission to camp).
- November 30 – American Civil War: Second Battle of Franklin: The Army of Tennessee led by General Hood mounts a dramatically unsuccessful frontal assault on Union positions around Franklin, Tennessee (Hood loses 6 generals and almost a third of his troops).

=== December ===
- December 4 – American Civil War: Sherman's March to the Sea: At Waynesboro, Georgia, forces under Union General Judson Kilpatrick prevent troops led by Confederate General Joseph Wheeler from interfering with Union General Sherman's campaign of destroying a wide swath of the South on his march to Savannah, Georgia (Union forces suffer more than 3 times the casualties as the Confederates, however).
- December 15–16 – American Civil War: Battle of Nashville: Union forces decisively defeat the Confederate Army of Tennessee.
- December 21 – American Civil War: Sherman's March to the Sea: The campaign ends as Major General William Tecumseh Sherman captures the port of Savannah, Georgia.

=== Undated ===
- Asa Mercer travels from Seattle to the U.S. East Coast and recruits 11 Mercer Girls, potential wives for men on the West Coast.
- Robert Lowry writes the gospel hymn "Shall We Gather at the River?".

=== Ongoing ===
- American Civil War (1861–1865)

== Births ==
=== January to June ===
- January 9 – Alvah Curtis Roebuck, American businessman, co-founder of Sears, Roebuck (d. 1948)
- January 10 – Annie Lowrie Alexander, physician and educator (d. 1929)
- February 7 – Arthur Collins, singer who records many early songs (d. 1933)
- March 2 – William Hall Milton, U.S. senator from Florida from 1908 to 1909 (d. 1942)
- March 19 – Charles Marion Russell, "cowboy artist" (d. 1926)
- April 8 – Orelia Key Bell, poet (d. 1959)
- April 16 – Rose Talbot Bullard, medical doctor and professor (d. 1915)
- May 1 – Anna Jarvis, social activist (d. 1948)
- May 15 – John E. Aldred, businessman (d. 1945)
- May 19 – Carl Akeley, taxidermist, sculptor, biologist, conservationist, inventor and nature photographer (d. 1926)

=== July to December ===
- July 8 – Frank B. Brandegee, U.S. senator from Connecticut from 1905 to 1924 (d. 1924)
- July 12 – George Washington Carver, African-American agricultural botanist (d. 1943)
- July 13 – John Jacob Astor IV, businessman. (d. 1912)
- July 21 – Frances Folsom Cleveland, First Lady of the United States as wife of Grover Cleveland (d. 1947)
- August 17 – Robert F. Broussard, U.S. senator from Louisiana from 1915 to 1918 (d. 1918)
- October 1 – Emma Sheridan Fry, actress and playwright (d. 1936)
- October 6 – Sarah Blizzard, labor activist (d. 1955)
- October 10 – T. Frank Appleby, U.S. congressman from New Jersey from 1921 to 1923 (d. 1924)
- October 16 – Ben M. Williamson, U.S. senator from Kentucky from 1930 to 1931 (d. 1941)
- November 5 –
  - Truman Handy Newberry, U.S. senator from Michigan from 1919 to 1922 (d. 1945)
  - Jessie Ralph, actress (d. 1944)
- November 8 – James Eli Watson, U.S. senator from Indiana from 1916 to 1933 (d. 1948)
- November 13 – James Cannon Jr., Methodist Episcopal Bishop and temperance movement leader (d. 1944)
- November 23 – Henry Bourne Joy, business leader (d. 1936)
- December 6 – William S. Hart, film actor, film director and writer (d. 1946)
- December 12 – Paul Elmer More, critic and essayist (d. 1937)
- December 14 – Frank Campeau, actor (d. 1943)
- December 22 – John A. M. Adair, U.S. representative from Indiana from 1907 to 1917 (d. 1938)
- December 25 – Thomas Cahill, soccer coach (d. 1951)
- December 27 – Peyton C. March, United States Army general (d. 1955)
- December 31 – Robert Grant Aitken, astronomer (d. 1951)

=== Full date unknown ===
- Kitty Cheatham, singer (d. 1946)

== Deaths ==
=== January to June ===
- January 1 – Solon Borland, U.S. senator from Arkansas from 1848 to 1853 (b. 1808)
- January 2 – Lemuel J. Bowden, U.S. senator from Virginia from 1863 to 1864 (b. 1815)
- January 7 – Caleb Blood Smith, journalist and politician in the Cabinet of Abraham Lincoln from 1862 to 1864 (b. 1808)
- January 13 – Stephen Foster, songwriter (b. 1826)
- January 31 – Hamilton Rowan Gamble, 16th Governor of Missouri from 1861 to 1864 (b. 1798)
- February 19 – William Edwin Baldwin, Confederate States Army general (b. 1827)
- February 25 – Anna Harrison, wife of William Henry Harrison, First Lady of the United States (b. 1775)
- March 2 – Ulric Dahlgren, Union Army officer (b. 1842)
- April 12 – Thomas Green, Confederate States Army general, killed at the Battle of Blair's Landing (b. 1814)
- April 30 – John B. Cocke, Confederate States Army officer, killed at the Battle of Jenkins' Ferry (b. c. 1833)
- March 4 – John James Appleton, diplomat, died in France (b. 1789)
- May 5 –
  - Alexander Hays, Union Army general, killed at the Battle of the Wilderness (b. 1819)
  - Leroy A. Stafford, Confederate States Army general, killed at the Battle of the Wilderness (b. 1822)
- May 6 – Henry Livermore Abbott, Union Army officer, killed at the Battle of the Wilderness (b. 1842)
- May 8 – James S. Wadsworth, Union Army general, died from wounds suffered at the Battle of the Wilderness (b. 1807)
- May 9 – John Sedgwick, Union Army general, killed at the Battle of Spotsylvania Court House (b. 1813)
- May 10 –
  - Thomas G. Stevenson, Union Army general, killed at the Battle of Spotsylvania Court House (b. 1836)
  - James Clay Rice, Union Army general, killed at the Battle of Spotsylvania Court House (b. 1828)
- May 12 – J. E. B. Stuart, Confederate States Army general, died of wound suffered at the Battle of Yellow Tavern (b. 1833)
- May 13 – Junius Daniel, Confederate States Army general, killed at the Battle of Spotsylvania Court House (b. 1828)
- May 19 – Nathaniel Hawthorne, Dark romantic novelist (b. 1804)
- June 14 – Leonidas Polk, Confederate States Army general, killed at the Battle of Marietta (b. 1806)

=== July to December ===
- July 22 – James B. McPherson, Union Army general, killed at the Battle of Atlanta (b. 1828)
- August 5 – Griffin A. Stedman, Union Army officer, died of wound suffered at the Siege of Petersburg (b. 1838)
- September 4 –
  - Henry Johnson, U.S. senator from Louisiana from 1818 to 1824 and from 1844 to 1849. (b. 1783)
  - Albert Smith White, U.S. senator from Indiana from 1839 to 1845 (b. 1803)
  - John Hunt Morgan, Confederate States Army general (b. 1825)
- September 20 – Charles B. Mitchel, Confederate States senator from Arkansas from 1862 until 1864 (b. 1815)
- October 18 – Roger Brooke Taney, politician, lawyer and judge (b. 1777)
- November 29 – White Antelope (Cheyenne: Wōkaī hwō'kō mǎs), killed at the Sand Creek Massacre
- November 30 – States Rights Gist, Confederate States Army general, killed at the Battle of Franklin (b. 1831)
- December 31 – George M. Dallas, 11th vice president of the United States from 1845 to 1849 (b. 1792)

== See also ==
- Timeline of United States history (1860–1899)
