= 1825 in the United States =

- Decades: 1800s; 1810s; 1820s; 1830s; 1840s
- See also: History of the United States (1789–1849); Timeline of United States history (1820–1859); List of years in the United States

1825 Vance-Finley map of the United States

The following are events from the year 1825 in the United States.

== Incumbents ==
=== Federal government ===
- President:

James Monroe (DR-Virginia) (until March 4)
John Quincy Adams (DR/NR-Massachusetts) (starting March 4)

- Vice President:

Daniel D. Tompkins (DR-New York) (until March 4)
John C. Calhoun (D-South Carolina) (starting March 4)

- Chief Justice: John Marshall (Virginia)
- Speaker of the House of Representatives:

Henry Clay (DR-Kentucky) (until March 4)
John W. Taylor (DR-New York) (starting December 5)

- Congress: 18th (until March 4), 19th (starting March 4)

==== State governments ====
Governors and lieutenant governors

=== Governors ===
- Governor of Alabama: Israel Pickens (Democratic-Republican) (until November 25), John Murphy (Democratic) (starting November 25)
- Governor of Connecticut: Oliver Wolcott Jr. (Toleration)
- Governor of Delaware: Samuel Paynter (Federalist)
- Governor of Georgia: George M. Troup (Democratic-Republican)
- Governor of Illinois: Edward Coles (Independent)
- Governor of Indiana: William Hendricks (Democratic-Republican) (until February 12), James B. Ray (Independent) (starting February 12)
- Governor of Kentucky: Joseph Desha (Democratic-Republican)
- Governor of Louisiana: Henry Johnson (National Republican)
- Governor of Maine: Albion K. Parris (Democratic-Republican)
- Governor of Maryland: Samuel Stevens Jr. (Democratic)
- Governor of Massachusetts:
  - until February 6: William Eustis (Democratic-Republican)
  - February 6-May 26: Marcus Morton (Democratic-Republican)
  - starting May 26: Levi Lincoln Jr. (National Republican)
- Governor of Mississippi: Walter Leake (Democratic-Republican) (until November 17), Gerard Brandon (Democratic) (starting November 17)
- Governor of Missouri: Frederick Bates (Democratic-Republican) (until August 4), Abraham J. Williams (Democratic-Republican) (starting August 4)
- Governor of New Hampshire: David L. Morril (Democratic-Republican)
- Governor of New Jersey: Isaac Halstead Williamson (Federalist)
- Governor of New York: DeWitt Clinton (Democratic-Republican) (starting January 1)
- Governor of North Carolina: Hutchins Gordon Burton (no political party)
- Governor of Ohio: Jeremiah Morrow (Democratic-Republican)
- Governor of Pennsylvania: John Andrew Shulze (Democratic-Republican)
- Governor of Rhode Island: James Fenner (Democratic-Republican)
- Governor of South Carolina: Richard Irvine Manning I (Democratic-Republican)
- Governor of Tennessee: William Carroll (Democratic-Republican)
- Governor of Vermont: Cornelius P. Van Ness (Democratic-Republican)
- Governor of Virginia: James Pleasants (Democratic-Republican) (until December 10), John Tyler (Democratic-Republican) (starting December 10)

=== Lieutenant governors ===
- Lieutenant Governor of Connecticut: David Plant (National Republican)
- Lieutenant Governor of Illinois: Adolphus Hubbard (Democratic-Republican)
- Lieutenant Governor of Indiana: vacant (until December 7), John H. Thompson (Democratic-Republican) (starting December 7)
- Lieutenant Governor of Kentucky: Robert B. McAfee (political party unknown)
- Lieutenant Governor of Massachusetts: Marcus Morton (political party unknown) (until month and day unknown), vacant (starting month and day unknown)
- Lieutenant Governor of Mississippi: Gerard C. Brandon (no political party) (until November 17), vacant (starting November 17)
- Lieutenant Governor of Missouri: Benjamin Harrison Reeves (Democratic-Republican) (until July), vacant (starting July)
- Lieutenant Governor of New York: vacant (until January 1), James Tallmadge Jr. (Democratic-Republican) (starting January 1)
- Lieutenant Governor of Rhode Island: Charles Collins (political party unknown) (starting month and day unknown)
- Lieutenant Governor of South Carolina: William Bull (Democratic-Republican)
- Lieutenant Governor of Vermont: Aaron Leland (Democratic-Republican)

== Events ==
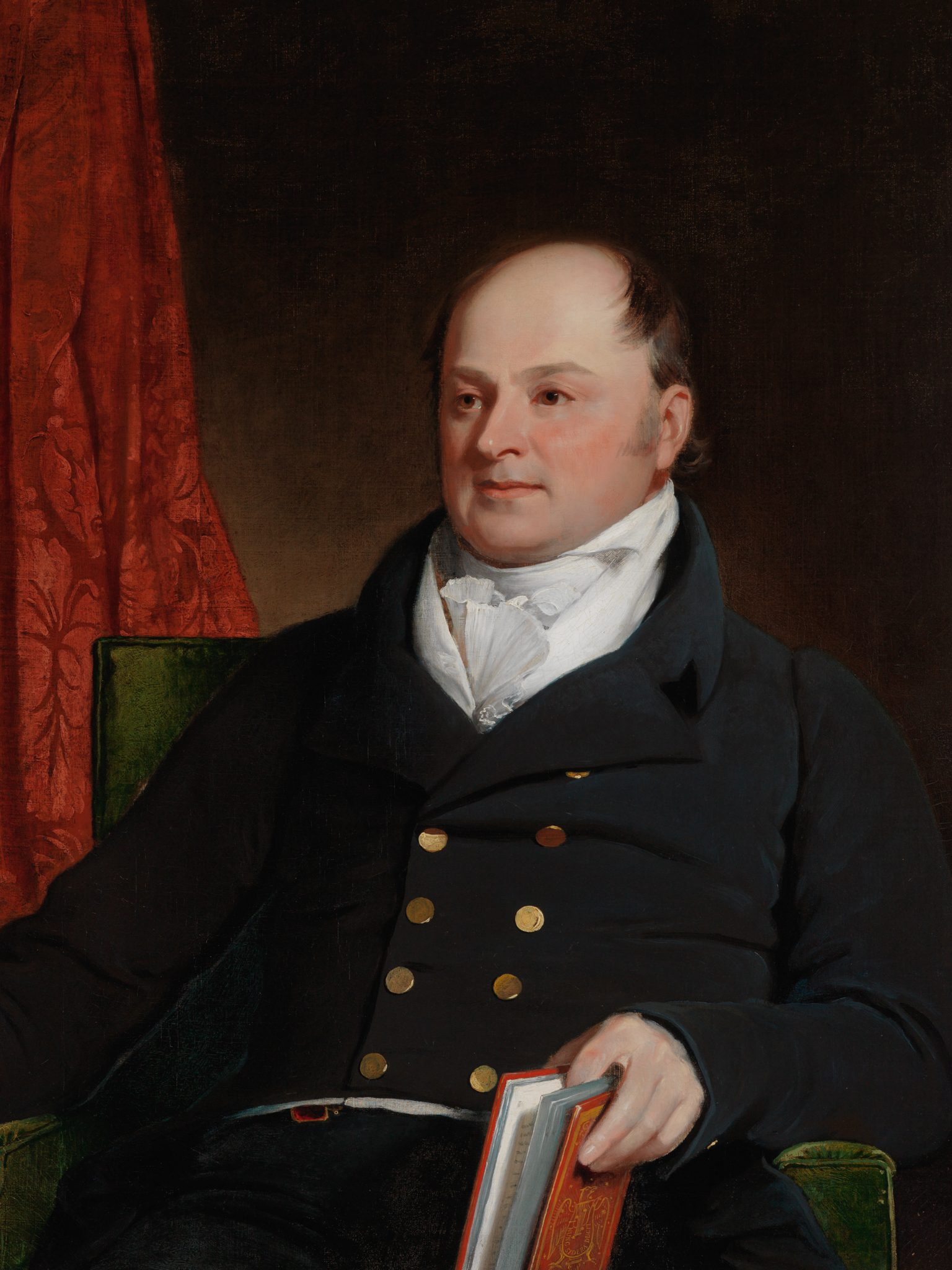
March 4: John Quincy Adams becomes the sixth U.S. president

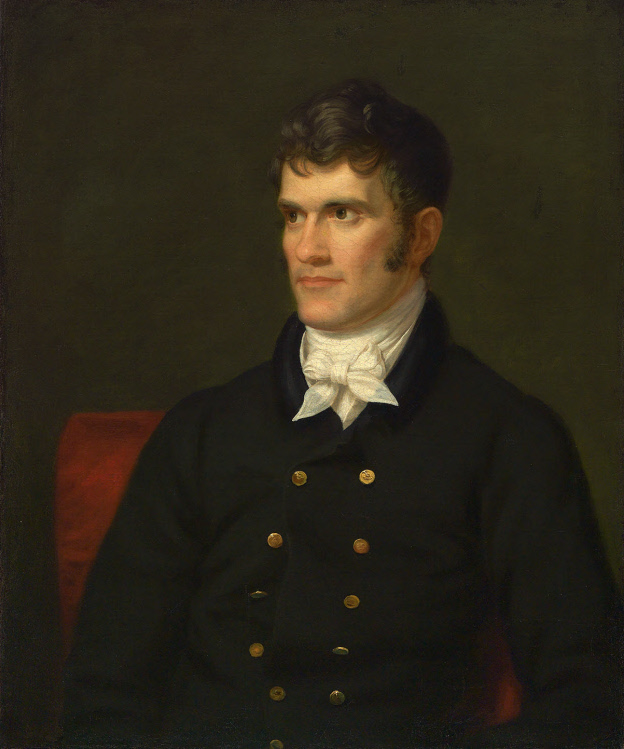
John C. Calhoun becomes the seventh U.S. vice president

=== January–March ===
- January 10 – Indianapolis becomes the capital of Indiana (moved from Corydon, Indiana).
- February 9 – After no presidential candidate receives a majority of U.S. Electoral College votes, the United States House of Representatives elects John Quincy Adams as President of the United States in a contingent election.
- February 12 – Treaty of Indian Springs: The Lower Creek Council, led by William McIntosh, cedes a large amount of Creek territory in Georgia to the United States government.
- March 4 – John Quincy Adams is sworn in as the sixth president of the United States, and John C. Calhoun is sworn in as the seventh vice president.
- March 17 – The Norfolk & Dedham Group is founded as The Norfolk Mutual Fire Insurance Company.

=== April–June ===
- April 30 – Upper Creek chief Menawa leads an attack that assassinates William McIntosh for signing the Treaty of Indian Springs.
- May 11 – American Tract Society is founded.
- June 3 – Kansa Nation cedes its territory to the United States (see History of Kansas).
- June 11 – The first cornerstone is laid for Fort Hamilton in New York City.

=== July–September ===
- July 14 – The Jefferson Literary and Debating Society is founded by 16 disgruntled members of the now-defunct Patrick Henry Society in Room 7, West Lawn, of the University of Virginia.
- August 19 – First Treaty of Prairie du Chien at Fort Crawford, Prairie du Chien, Wisconsin

=== October–December ===
- October 25 – The Erie Canal opens, granting passage from Albany, New York to Lake Erie.
- November 7
  - Treaty of St. Louis: 1,400 Missouri Shawnees are forcibly relocated from Missouri to Kansas (see History of Kansas).
  - Beauchamp–Sharp Tragedy: Lawyer Jereboam O. Beauchamp murders Kentucky legislator Solomon P. Sharp in a family feud, becaming the first person legally executed in the state.
- November 12 – New Echota designated as the capital of the Cherokee Nation.
- November 26 – At Union College in Schenectady, New York a group of college students form Kappa Alpha Society as the first college social fraternity (it is the first to combine aspects of secret Greek-letter societies, literary societies and formalized student social groups).

=== Undated ===
- The Osage Nation cedes traditional lands by treaty.
- The Cherokee Nation officially adopts Sequoyah's syllabary.
- Vancouver, Washington is established by Dr. John McLoughlin on behalf of the Hudson's Bay Company.
- Ypsilanti, Michigan is established.
- Vicksburg, Mississippi is incorporated.
- New Harmony, Indiana established as a social experiment, built by the Harmony Society and sold to Robert Owen.
- The United States Postal Service starts a dead letter office.
- Centenary College of Louisiana is founded in Jackson, Louisiana. The campus later moves to Shreveport, Louisiana.

=== Ongoing ===
- Era of Good Feelings (1817–1825)
- John Neal publishing serially the first written history of American literature, American Writers (1824–1825)

== Births ==
- January 5 – John Mason Loomis, lumber tycoon, Union militia colonel in the American Civil War and philanthropist (died 1900)
- January 11
  - Clement V. Rogers, Cherokee politician and father of Will Rogers (died 1911)
  - Bayard Taylor, poet and travel writer (died 1878)
- January 25 – George Pickett, Confederate general in the American Civil War (died 1876)
- February 11 – Frank Pidgeon, baseball pitcher (died 1884)
- April 7 – John H. Gear, U.S. Senator from Iowa from 1895 to 1900 (died 1900)
- April 17 – Jerome B. Chaffee, U.S. Senator from Colorado from 1876 to 1879 (died 1886)
- June 1 – John Hunt Morgan, Confederate general in the American Civil War (died 1864)
- July 2 – Richard Henry Stoddard, critic and poet (died 1903)
- July 10 – Benjamin Paul Akers, sculptor (died 1861)
- July 15 – Joseph Carter Abbott, U.S. Senator from North Carolina from 1868 to 1871 (died 1881)
- July 19 – George H. Pendleton, politician (died 1889)
- August 7 – Jacob Wrey Mould, New York architect, illustrator, linguist and musician (died 1886)
- August 10 – Edmund Spangler, carpenter and stagehand employed at Ford's Theatre at the time of the assassination of Abraham Lincoln (died 1875)
- September 13 – William Henry Rinehart, sculptor (died 1874)
- September 17 – Lucius Quintus Cincinnatus Lamar II, politician and Associate Justice of the Supreme Court of the United States (died 1893)
- September 24 – Frances Harper, née Watkins, African American poet and abolitionist (died 1911)
- October 8 – Paschal Beverly Randolph, occultist (died 1875)
- October 25 – Francis March, comparative linguist (died 1911)
- November 9 – A. P. Hill, Confederate general (killed 1865 in the American Civil War)
- December 18 – John S. Harris, U.S. Senator from Louisiana from 1868 to 1871 (died 1906)
- December 30
  - Newton Booth, U.S. Senator from California from 1875 to 1881 (died 1892)
  - Samuel Newitt Wood, politician (died 1891)

== Deaths ==
- January 8 – Eli Whitney, inventor of the cotton gin and milling machine (born 1765)
- March 1 – John Haggin, "Indian fighter" and early settler of Kentucky (born 1753)
- March 4 – Hercules Mulligan, tailor and spy during the American Revolutionary War (born 1740)
- March 4 – Raphaelle Peale, still-life painter (born 1774)
- June 4 – Morris Birkbeck, writer and social reformer (born 1764)
- June 11 – Daniel Tompkins, sixth vice president of the United States from 1817 to 1825 (born 1774)
- June 14 – Pierre Charles L'Enfant, architect and civil engineer (born 1754 in France)
- August 16 – Charles Cotesworth Pinckney, politician and soldier (born 1746)
- August 27 – Lucretia Maria Davidson, poet (born 1808; died of consumption)
- September 1 – Cyprian Sterry, transatlantic slave trader based in Rhode Island (born c. 1753)
- December 28 – James Wilkinson, soldier and statesman (born 1757)

== See also ==
- Timeline of United States history (1820–1859)
