= 1895 in the United States =

- Decades: 1870s; 1880s; 1890s; 1900s; 1910s
- See also: History of the United States (1865–1918); Timeline of United States history (1860–1899); List of years in the United States

Events from the year 1895 in the United States.

== Incumbents ==
=== Federal government ===
- President: Grover Cleveland (D-New York)
- Vice President: Adlai E. Stevenson I (D-Illinois)
- Chief Justice: Melville Fuller (Illinois)
- Speaker of the House of Representatives:

Charles Frederick Crisp (D-Georgia) (until March 4)
Thomas Brackett Reed (R-Maine) (starting December 2)

- Congress: 53rd (until March 4), 54th (starting March 4)

==== State governments ====
Governors and lieutenant governors

=== Governors ===
- Governor of Alabama: William C. Oates (Democratic)
- Governor of Arkansas: William Meade Fishback (Democratic) (until January 18), James Paul Clarke (Democratic) (starting January 18)
- Governor of California: Henry Markham (Republican) (until January 11), James Budd (Democratic) (starting January 11)
- Governor of Colorado: Davis Hanson Waite (People's) (until January 8), Albert McIntire (Republican) (starting January 8)
- Governor of Connecticut: Luzon B. Morris (Democratic) (until January 9), Owen Vincent Coffin (Republican) (starting January 9)
- Governor of Delaware:
  - until January 15: Robert J. Reynolds (Democratic)
  - January 15-April 8: Joshua H. Marvil (Republican)
  - starting April 8: William T. Watson (Democratic)
- Governor of Florida: Henry L. Mitchell (Democratic)
- Governor of Georgia: William Yates Atkinson (Democratic)
- Governor of Idaho: William J. McConnell (Republican)
- Governor of Illinois: John Peter Altgeld (Democratic)
- Governor of Indiana: Claude Matthews (Democratic)
- Governor of Iowa: Frank D. Jackson (Republican)
- Governor of Kansas: Lorenzo D. Lewelling (Populist) (until January 14), Edmund N. Morrill (Republican) (starting January 14)
- Governor of Kentucky: John Y. Brown (Democratic) (until December 10), William O. Bradley (Republican) (starting December 10)
- Governor of Louisiana: Murphy James Foster, Sr. (Democratic)
- Governor of Maine: Henry B. Cleaves (Republican)
- Governor of Maryland: Frank Brown (Democratic)
- Governor of Massachusetts: Frederic T. Greenhalge (Republican)
- Governor of Michigan: John T. Rich (Republican)
- Governor of Minnesota: Knute Nelson (Republican) (until January 31), David M. Clough (Republican) (starting January 31)
- Governor of Mississippi: John M. Stone (Democratic)
- Governor of Missouri: William Joel Stone (Democratic)
- Governor of Montana: John E. Rickards (Republican)
- Governor of Nebraska: Lorenzo Crounse (Republican) (until January 3), Silas A. Holcomb (Democratic) (starting January 3)
- Governor of Nevada: Roswell K. Colcord (Republican) (until January 7), John Edward Jones (Silver) (starting January 7)
- Governor of New Hampshire: John Butler Smith (Republican) (until January 3), Charles A. Busiel (Republican) (starting January 3)
- Governor of New Jersey: George Theodore Werts (Democratic)
- Governor of New York: Levi P. Morton (Republican) (starting January 1)
- Governor of North Carolina: Elias Carr (Democratic)
- Governor of North Dakota: Eli C. D. Shortridge (Democratic)/(Independent) (until January 10), Roger Allin (Republican) (starting January 10)
- Governor of Ohio: William McKinley (Republican)
- Governor of Oregon: Sylvester Pennoyer (Democratic) (until January 14), William Paine Lord (Republican) (starting January 14)
- Governor of Pennsylvania: Robert E. Pattison (Democratic) (until January 15), Daniel H. Hastings (Republican) (starting January 15)
- Governor of Rhode Island: D. Russell Brown (Republican) (until May 29), Charles W. Lippitt (Republican) (starting May 29)
- Governor of South Carolina: John Gary Evans (Democratic)
- Governor of South Dakota: Charles H. Sheldon (Republican)
- Governor of Tennessee: Peter Turney (Democratic)
- Governor of Texas: James Stephen Hogg (Democratic) (until January 15), Charles A. Culberson (Democratic) (starting January 15)
- Governor of Vermont: Urban A. Woodbury (Republican)
- Governor of Virginia: Charles Triplett O'Ferrall (Democratic)
- Governor of Washington: John McGraw (Republican)
- Governor of West Virginia: William A. MacCorkle (Democratic)
- Governor of Wisconsin: George W. Peck (Democratic) (until January 7), William H. Upham (Republican) (starting January 7)
- Governor of Wyoming: John E. Osborne (Democratic) (until January 7), William A. Richards (Republican) (starting January 7)

=== Lieutenant governors ===
- Lieutenant Governor of California:
  - until January 11: John B. Reddick (Republican)
  - January 11-October 25: Spencer G. Millard (Republican)
  - starting October 25: William T. Jeter (Democratic)
- Lieutenant Governor of Colorado: David Hopkinson Nichols (Democratic) (until January 8), Jared L. Brush (Republican) (starting January 8)
- Lieutenant Governor of Connecticut: Ernest Cady (Democratic) (until January 9), Lorrin A. Cooke (Republican) (starting January 9)
- Lieutenant Governor of Idaho: F. B. Willis (Republican) (until January 7), F. J. Mills (Republican) (starting January 7)
- Lieutenant Governor of Illinois: Joseph B. Gill (Democratic)
- Lieutenant Governor of Indiana: Mortimer Nye (Democratic)
- Lieutenant Governor of Iowa: Warren S. Dungan (Republican)
- Lieutenant Governor of Kansas: Percy Daniels (Populist) (until January 14), James A. Troutman (Republican) (starting January 14)
- Lieutenant Governor of Kentucky: Mitchell Cary Alford (Democratic) (until month and day unknown), William J. Worthington (Republican) (starting month and day unknown)
- Lieutenant Governor of Louisiana: Hiram R. Lott (Democratic) (until month and day unknown), Robert H. Snyder (Democratic) (starting month and day unknown)
- Lieutenant Governor of Massachusetts: Roger Wolcott (Republican)
- Lieutenant Governor of Michigan:
  - until month and day unknown: J. Wight Giddings (Republican)
  - month and day unknown: Alfred Milnes (Republican)
  - starting month and day unknown: Joseph R. McLaughlin (Republican)
- Lieutenant Governor of Minnesota: David M. Clough (Republican) (until January 31), Frank A. Day (Republican) (starting January 31)
- Lieutenant Governor of Mississippi: M. M. Evans (Democratic)
- Lieutenant Governor of Missouri: John B. O'Meara (Democratic)
- Lieutenant Governor of Montana: Alexander Campbell Botkin (Republican)
- Lieutenant Governor of Nebraska: Thomas J. Majors (Republican) (until January 3), Robert E. Moore (Democratic) (starting January 3)
- Lieutenant Governor of Nevada: Joseph Poujade (political party unknown) (until month and day unknown), Reinhold Sadler (Silver) (starting month and day unknown)
- Lieutenant Governor of New York: Charles T. Saxton (Republican) (starting January 1)
- Lieutenant Governor of North Carolina: Rufus A. Doughton (Democratic)
- Lieutenant Governor of North Dakota: Elmer D. Wallace (Democratic) (until January 10), John H. Worst (Republican) (starting January 10)
- Lieutenant Governor of Ohio: Andrew L. Harris (Republican)
- Lieutenant Governor of Pennsylvania: Louis Arthur Watres (Republican) (until January 23), Walter Lyon (Republican) (starting January 23)
- Lieutenant Governor of Rhode Island: Edwin Allen (Republican)
- Lieutenant Governor of South Carolina: Washington H. Timmerman (Democratic)
- Lieutenant Governor of South Dakota: Charles N. Herreid (Republican)
- Lieutenant Governor of Tennessee: William C. Dismukes (Democratic) (until month and day unknown), Ernest Pillow (Democratic) (starting month and day unknown)
- Lieutenant Governor of Texas: Martin McNulty Crane (Democratic) (until January 15), George Taylor Jester (Democratic) (starting January 15)
- Lieutenant Governor of Vermont: Zophar M. Mansur (Republican)
- Lieutenant Governor of Virginia: Robert Craig Kent (Democratic)
- Lieutenant Governor of Washington: F. H. Luce (Republican)
- Lieutenant Governor of Wisconsin: vacant (until January 7), Emil Baensch (Republican) (starting January 7)

== Events ==
- January 6-9 – Robert William Wilcox leads a rebellion in Hawai'i
- February 9 – Mintonette, later known as volleyball, is created by William G. Morgan at Holyoke, Massachusetts.
- March 1 – William Lyne Wilson is appointed United States Postmaster General.
- May 27 – In re Debs: The Supreme Court of the United States decides that the federal government has the right to regulate interstate commerce, legalizing the military suppression of the Pullman Strike.
- June 28 – The United States Court of Private Land Claims rules that James Reavis's claim to Barony of Arizona is "wholly fictitious and fraudulent".
- July 4 – Katharine Lee Bates' lyrics for "America the Beautiful" are first published.
- July 6 – Van Cortlandt Golf Course opens in The Bronx as the country's first and oldest public golf course.
- August 19 – American frontier murderer and outlaw John Wesley Hardin is killed by an off-duty policeman in a saloon in El Paso, Texas.
- September 3 – The first professional American football game is played, in Latrobe, Pennsylvania, between the Latrobe YMCA and the Jeannette Athletic Club (Latrobe wins 12–0).
- September 18 – Booker T. Washington delivers the Atlanta Compromise speech.
- November 5 – George B. Selden is granted the first U.S. patent for an automobile.
- November 20 – USS Indiana, the first battleship in the United States Navy comparable to foreign battleships of this time, is commissioned.
- November 25 – Oscar Hammerstein opens the Olympia Theatre, the first theatre to be built in New York City's Times Square district.
- November 28 – Chicago Times-Herald race: The first American automobile race in history is sponsored by the Chicago Times-Herald. Press coverage first arouses significant U.S. interest in the automobile.
- December 24 – George Washington Vanderbilt II officially opens his Biltmore Estate on Christmas Eve, inviting his family and guests to celebrate his new home in Asheville, North Carolina.

=== Undated ===
- W. E. B. Du Bois becomes the first African American to receive a Ph.D. from Harvard University.
- The gold reserve of the U.S. Treasury is saved when J. P. Morgan and the Rothschilds loan $65 million worth of gold to the United States government.
- Temple Cup: Cleveland Spiders defeat Baltimore Orioles, 4 games to 1

=== Ongoing ===
- Gilded Age (1869–c. 1896)
- Gay Nineties (1890–1899)
- Progressive Era (1890s–1920s)

== Births ==
- January 1
  - Bert Acosta, aviator (died 1954)
  - J. Edgar Hoover, 1st Director of the Federal Bureau of Investigation (died 1972)
- January 4 – Leroy Grumman, aeronautical engineer, test pilot and industrialist (died 1982)
- January 11 – Laurens Hammond, inventor (died 1973)
- January 23 – Harry Darby, U.S. Senator from Kansas from 1949 to 1950 (died 1987)
- February 2 – George Halas, football player (died 1983)
- February 6 – Babe Ruth, baseball player (died 1948)
- February 25 – Lew Andreas, basketball coach (died 1984)
- March 4
  - Milt Gross, comic book illustrator and animator (died 1953)
  - Shemp Howard, actor and comedian (The Three Stooges) (died 1955)
- March 12 – William C. Lee, general (died 1948)
- March 15 – Virgil Chapman, U.S. Senator from Kentucky from 1949 to 1951 (died 1951)
- March 27 – Ruth Snyder, murderer (electrocuted 1928)
- March 28
  - Donald Barnhouse, theologian, pastor, author, and radio pioneer (died 1960)
  - Spencer W. Kimball, president of The Church of Jesus Christ of Latter-day Saints (died 1985)
- April 20 – Emile Christian, musician (died 1973)
- May 2 – Lorenz Hart, lyricist (died 1943)
- May 11 – William Grant Still, "the Dean" of African American composers (died 1978)
- May 15 – Prescott Bush, U.S. Senator from Connecticut from 1952 to 1963 (died 1972)
- May 25 – Dorothea Lange, documentary photographer and photojournalist (died 1965 in the United States)
- May 28 – Samuel D. Jackson, U.S. Senator from Indiana in 1944 (died 1951)
- June 10
  - William C. Feazel, U.S. Senator from Louisiana in 1948 (died 1965)
  - Hattie McDaniel, African American film actress (died 1952)
- June 21 – John Wesley Snyder, businessman and Secretary of the Treasury (died 1985)
- June 24 – Jack Dempsey, heavyweight boxer (died 1983)
- July 1 – Lucy Somerville Howorth, lawyer, feminist and politician (died 1997)
- July 3 – Jean Paige, actress (died 1990)
- July 4 – Irving Caesar, lyricist and theater composer (died 1996)
- July 9 – Joe Gleason, baseball pitcher (died 1990)
- July 10 – Andrew Earl Weatherly, philatelist (died 1981)
- July 12 – Richard Buckminster Fuller, architect (died 1983)
- July 13 – Bradley Kincaid, folk singer (died 1989)
- July 19 – Snake Henry, baseball player (died 1987)
- July 20 – Chapman Revercomb, politician and lawyer (died 1979)
- July 26
  - Gracie Allen, comic actress (died 1964)
  - Kenneth Harlan, actor (died 1967)
- July 30 – Joseph DuMoe, football coach (died 1959)
- August 10 – Harry Richman, entertainer (died 1972)
- August 12 – Lynde D. McCormick, admiral (died 1956)
- September 20 – Lloyd W. Bertaud, aviator (died 1927)
- September 22 – Elmer Austin Benson, U.S. Senator from Minnesota from 1935 to 1936 and 24th Governor of Minnesota from 1937 to 1939 (died 1985)
- September 29 – Joseph Banks Rhine, parapsychologist (died 1980)
- October 4 – Buster Keaton, born Joseph Frank Keaton, silent film comedian (died 1966)
- October 6 – Caroline Gordon, writer and critic (died 1981)
- October 13 – Mike Gazella, baseball player (died 1978)
- October 14 – Silas Simmons, Pre-Negro league baseball player, longest-lived professional baseball player (died 2006)
- October 19 – Lewis Mumford, historian & philosopher of science (died 1990)
- October 22 – Johnny Morrison, baseball player (died 1966)
- October 23 – Clinton Presba Anderson, U.S. Senator from New Mexico from 1949 to 1973 (died 1975)
- October 30 – Dickinson W. Richards, physician, recipient of the Nobel Prize in Physiology or Medicine (died 1973)
- November 10 – John Knudsen Northrop, airplane manufacturer (died 1981)
- November 14 – Walter Freeman, neurologist (died 1972)
- November 29 – Busby Berkeley, film director and choreographer (died 1976)
- December 2 – W. Conway Pierce, chemist (died 1974)
- December 20 – Susanne Langer, philosopher (died 1985)
- December 24 – Marguerite Williams, African American geologist (died 1991)
- December 28 – Carol Ryrie Brink, author (died 1981)

== Deaths ==
- January 9 – Aaron Lufkin Dennison, watchmaker (born 1812)
- February 20 – Frederick Douglass, African American rights activist and former slave (born 1817)
- March 22 – Henry Coppée, historian and biographer (born 1821)
- April 22 – James F. Wilson, U.S. Senator from Iowa from 1883 to 1895. (born 1828)
- May 28 – Walter Q. Gresham, politician (born 1832)
- June 23
  - Thomas Shaw, buffalo soldier and Medal of Honor recipient (born 1846)
  - James Renwick Jr., architect (born 1818)
- June 29 – Green Clay Smith, politician (born 1826)
- July 28 – Edward Beecher, theologian (born 1803)
- August 1 – Hugh O'Brien, 31st Mayor of Boston, Massachusetts (born 1827)
- August 6 – George Frederick Root, composer (born 1820)
- August 22 – Luzon B. Morris, politician (born 1827)
- October 2 – Robert Crozier, U.S. Senator from Kansas from 1873 to 1874 (born 1827)
- October 6 – L. L. Langstroth, beekeeper (born 1810)
- October 8 – William Mahone, civil engineer and Confederate Army major general (born 1826)
- October 14 – Clara Doty Bates, poet and children's literature author (born 1838)
- November 4 – Eugene Field, children's author (born 1850)
- Full date unknown – John Miley, Methodist theologian (born 1813)

== See also ==
- List of American films of the 1890s
- Timeline of United States history (1860–1899)
