= 1827 in the United States =

- Decades: 1800s; 1810s; 1820s; 1830s; 1840s
- See also: History of the United States (1789–1849); Timeline of United States history (1820–1859); List of years in the United States

Events from the year 1827 in the United States.

== Incumbents ==
=== Federal government ===
- President: John Quincy Adams (DR/NR-Massachusetts)
- Vice President: John C. Calhoun (D-South Carolina)
- Chief Justice: John Marshall (Virginia)
- Speaker of the House of Representatives:

John W. Taylor (DR-New York) (until March 4)
Andrew Stevenson (D-Virginia) (starting December 3)

- Congress: 19th (until March 4), 20th (starting March 4)

==== State governments ====
Governors and lieutenant governors

=== Governors ===
- Governor of Alabama: John Murphy (Democratic)
- Governor of Connecticut: Oliver Wolcott Jr. (Toleration) (until May 2), Gideon Tomlinson (Democratic-Republican) (starting May 2)
- Governor of Delaware: Samuel Paynter (Federalist) (until January 16), Charles Polk Jr. (Federalist) (starting January 16)
- Governor of Georgia: George M. Troup (Democratic-Republican) (until November 7), John Forsyth (Democratic-Republican) (starting November 7)
- Governor of Illinois: Ninian Edwards (Democratic-Republican)
- Governor of Indiana: James B. Ray (Independent)
- Governor of Kentucky: Joseph Desha (Democratic-Republican)
- Governor of Louisiana: Henry Johnson (National Republican)
- Governor of Maine: Albion K. Parris (Democratic-Republican) (until January 3), Enoch Lincoln (Democratic-Republican) (starting January 3)
- Governor of Maryland: Joseph Kent (Democratic-Republican)
- Governor of Massachusetts: Levi Lincoln Jr. (National Republican)
- Governor of Mississippi: Gerard Brandon (Democratic)
- Governor of Missouri: John Miller (Democratic)
- Governor of New Hampshire: David L. Morril (Democratic-Republican) (until June 7), Benjamin Pierce (Democratic-Republican) (starting June 7)
- Governor of New Jersey: Isaac Halstead Williamson (Federalist)
- Governor of New York: DeWitt Clinton (Democratic-Republican)
- Governor of North Carolina: Hutchins Gordon Burton (no political party) (until December 8), James Iredell Jr. (Democratic-Republican) (starting December 8)
- Governor of Ohio: Allen Trimble (Federalist)
- Governor of Pennsylvania: John Andrew Shulze (Democratic-Republican)
- Governor of Rhode Island: James Fenner (Democratic-Republican)
- Governor of South Carolina: John Taylor (Democratic-Republican)
- Governor of Tennessee: William Carroll (Democratic-Republican) (until October 1), Sam Houston (Democratic-Republican) (starting October 1)
- Governor of Vermont: Ezra Butler (National Republican)
- Governor of Virginia: John Tyler (Democratic-Republican) (until March 4), William Branch Giles (Democratic) (starting March 4)

=== Lieutenant governors ===
- Lieutenant Governor of Connecticut: David Plant (National Republican) (until May 2), John Samuel Peters (National Republican) (starting May 2)
- Lieutenant Governor of Illinois: William Kinney (Democratic-Republican)
- Lieutenant Governor of Indiana: John H. Thompson (Democratic-Republican)
- Lieutenant Governor of Kentucky: Robert B. McAfee (political party unknown)
- Lieutenant Governor of Massachusetts: vacant (until month and day unknown), Thomas L. Winthrop (political party unknown) (starting month and day unknown)
- Lieutenant Governor of Mississippi: vacant
- Lieutenant Governor of Missouri: vacant
- Lieutenant Governor of New York: Nathaniel Pitcher (Democratic-Republican) (starting January 1)
- Lieutenant Governor of Rhode Island: Charles Collins (political party unknown)
- Lieutenant Governor of South Carolina: James Witherspoon (Democratic-Republican)
- Lieutenant Governor of Vermont: Aaron Leland (Democratic-Republican) (until month and day unknown), Henry Olin (Democratic-Republican) (starting month and day unknown)

== Events ==
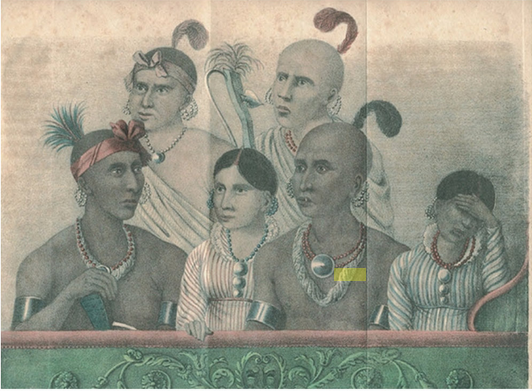
Kihegashugah and Big Soldier were among the Osage who toured France

- February 28 – The Baltimore and Ohio Railroad is incorporated, becoming the first railroad in America offering commercial transportation of both people and freight.
- March 12 – In Brown v. Maryland, the United States Supreme Court ruled that imported goods in their original package are under federal jurisdiction and thus not subject to state regulation.
- March 16 – Freedom's Journal, the first African-American owned and published newspaper in the United States, is founded in New York City by John Russwurm.
- May 21 – The Maryland Democratic Party is founded by supporters of Andrew Jackson in Baltimore and hosts its first meeting at the Baltimore Atheneum.
- July 4 – Madawaska declares independence from the United States, as part of a border dispute between British North America and the United States, so that it can be annexed by Maine.
- September 3 – Ho-Chunk leader Red Bird surrenders to U.S. officials, ending the Winnebago War.
- J. J. Audubon's The Birds of America commences publication in the United Kingdom.
- September 25 – Madawaska is annexed by the United States, and John Baker is arrested.
- December 27 – Arson is suspected in a building fire in Huntsville, Alabama that destroyed public land records at the surveyor general's office.
- The original Delmonico's restaurant opens in Manhattan.
- The first English translation of Christopher Columbus' journal by Samuel Kettell is published in Boston.
- John Neal opens the first public gymnasium in the United States founded by an American in Portland, Maine.
- Six Osage people depart Missouri for a three-year tour of France.

== Births ==
- January 17 – Samuel Hartt Pook, Boston naval architect (died 1901)
- February 17 – Rose Terry Cooke, fiction writer and poet (died 1892)
- March 25 – Stephen Luce, admiral (died 1917)
- April 10 – Lew Wallace, Union general in the American Civil War, politician and novelist (died 1905)
- May 10 – William Windom, U.S. Senator from Minnesota from 1870 to 1881 and from 1881 to 1883 (died 1891)
- May 21 – William P. Sprague, Ohio politician (died 1899)
- May 23 – Milton Latham, U.S. Senator from California from 1860 to 1863 (died 1882)
- May 27 – Samuel F. Miller, politician (died 1892)
- June 7 – Alonzo J. Edgerton, U.S. Senator from Minnesota in 1881 (died 1896)
- June 9 – Francis Miles Finch, judge, poet and academic (died 1907)
- June 10 – Thomas W. Ferry, U.S. Senator from Michigan from 1871 to 1883 (died 1896)
- June 15 – Jared W. Daniels, American physician, Indian agent, and military officer (died 1904)
- July 11 – Austin Corbin, railroad executive and robber baron (died 1896)
- July 13 – Hugh O'Brien, 31st Mayor of Boston, Massachusetts (died 1895)
- July 19 – Orville H. Platt, U.S. Senator from Connecticut from 1879 to 1905 (died 1905)
- August 3 – John Williams Tobey, architect, carpenter and builder (died 1909)
- August 6 – George Franklin Drew, 12th Governor of Florida (died 1900)
- September 18 – John Townsend Trowbridge, author (died 1916)
- September 26 – Daniel W. Voorhees, U.S. Senator from Indiana from 1877 to 1897 (died 1897)
- September 28 – Aaron A. Sargent, journalist and lawyer, U.S. Senator from California from 1873 to 1879 (died 1887)
- September 30 – Ellis H. Roberts, politician (died 1918)
- October 12 – Josiah Parsons Cooke, chemist (died 1894)
- October 13 – Robert Crozier, U.S. Senator from Kansas from 1873 to 1874 (died 1895)
- November 10 – J. T. Wamelink, Dutch-born composer (died 1910)
- November 26 – Ellen G. White, née Harmon, Adventist (died 1915)
- Date unknown – Asahel C. Beckwith, U.S. Senator from Wyoming in 1893 (died 1896)

== Deaths ==
- February 22 – Charles Willson Peale, portrait painter (born 1741)
- February 23 – Felipe Enrique Neri, Texas legislator, colonizer (born 1759)
- April 20 – Jeffrey Brace, enslaved memoirist (born c. 1742 in Middle Niger)
- April 24 – Israel Pickens, U.S. Senator from Alabama from 1821 to 1825 (born 1780)
- April 29
  - Rufus King, lawyer, politician and diplomat (born 1755)
  - Deborah Sampson, first American female soldier (born 1760)
- May 29 – Carlos Wilcox, poet (born 1794)
- August 28 – Overseer Ira Walton kills Gilbert at Andrew Jackson's slave-labor camp The Hermitage.
- September 23 – Freeman Walker, U.S. Senator from Georgia from 1819 to 1821 (born 1780)
- October 12 – John Eager Howard, politician (born 1752)
- November 10 – St. George Tucker, lawyer and poet (born 1752 in Bermuda)
- November 25 – Enoch Fenwick, Jesuit priest (born 1780)

== See also ==
- Timeline of United States history (1820–1859)
