= Marion Welchman =

Marion Welchman MBE
- Born: Elsie Marion Eves; 6 June 1915; Penarth, Glamorganshire, Wales
- Died: 19 April 1997 (aged 81); Hatch End, Middlesex, England
- Occupation: Nurse
- Notable work: Campaigning for dyslexia recognition and remediation

Elsie Marion Welchman (née Eves; 6 June 1915 – 19 April 1997) was a British charity administrator and nurse. She was involved in campaigning for the recognition of dyslexia and its remediation; locally through the Bath Association for Dyslexia, nationally with the British Dyslexia Association, and then internationally. Her early career had been as a state registered nurse and in occupational health care, before taking an interest in dyslexia after looking for help for her otherwise intelligent son who struggled with poor spelling at school.

== Biography ==
Elsie Marion Eves was born on 6 June 1915 in Penarth, Glamorganshire, Wales. From 1934 and 1937, she trained as a state registered nurse at Cardiff Royal Infirmary, Cardiff, Wales. She would later move into occupational health during the Second World War, and worked at the Westinghouse Brake and Signal Company in Chippenham, Wiltshire, England. There, she met her future husband Denis Welchman, who was working as an electrical engineer. They married in 1943 in Penarth, Wales, and settled in Bath, England. Her first career ended with motherhood, and they had three children together.

Her only son Howard was born in 1955. He was otherwise intelligent but struggled with poor spelling at school for which he was often beaten. Looking for assistance, she reached out to the Word Blind Centre, which had been founded in London in 1963. They educated her on dyslexia and put her in contact with the emerging worldwide effort to combat it. The Orton Dyslexia Society, based in the United States, recommended a method of remediation and a specialist teacher for her son: the results were transformative and Howard would go on to run a publishing business in later life.

Looking to expand such help to other children, Welchman established the Bath Association for Dyslexia in 1966. From 1966 to 1973, it ran training schools for teachers and parents with the assistance of Sally Childs of the Orton Dyslexia Society and then local professionals. Influenced by her successes, a number of other associations were founded across the United Kingdom. She also toured the United Kingdom to talk to parents, and undertook a six-week study tour of dyslexia organisations in North America in 1971. In 1972, she expanded her work nationally with the foundation of the British Dyslexia Association (BDA). She ran the BDA as its honorary secretary until 1979. Initially personally seen as a "fussy mother from Bath" and as part of a group of parents who were looking for "convenient excuses for the limitations of their children", they had to contend with politicians and many professionals who refused to accept the validity of dyslexia.

Following the death of her husband in 1984, she began to travel internally to campaign for the recognition and remediation of dyslexia. She helped found the European Dyslexia Association in 1987 and then the World Dyslexia Network Foundation in 1995. In the 1992 New Year Honours, she was appointed Member of the Order of the British Empire (MBE) "for services to the British Dyslexia Association".

Welchman was diagnosed with chronic myeloid leukaemia, and was too ill to attend the BDA's 4th International Conference held in York in early 1997. She died on 19 April 1997 in Hatch End, Middlesex, England; she was aged 81.
