= National Geographic Explorer =

American documentary TV series

- A 2005 title screenshot.
- Also known as: Explorer
- Genre: Documentary; Geography; History; Science; Adventure
- Created by: Joe Seamans
- Developed by: Joe Seamans
- Presented by: Bingo O'Malley (original); Lisa Ling (2003–2010)
- Starring: Phil Keoghan (2018-Current)
- Narrated by: Bingo O'Malley (original); Lisa Ling (2003–2010); Phil Keoghan (2018–Current)
- Theme music composer: Elmer Bernstein
- Country of origin: United States
- Original language: English
- No. of episodes: 233

Production
- Executive producer: Jonathan Halperin
- Camera setup: Multiple
- Running time: 90 minutes
- Production company: National Geographic Society

Original release
- Network: Nickelodeon (1985–1986) TBS (1986–1999); CNBC (1999–2001); MSNBC (2001–2004); National Geographic Channel (2004–present)
- Release: April 7, 1985 – present

Related
- National Geographic Specials; National Geographic Ultimate Explorer

National Geographic Explorer (or simply Explorer) is an American documentary television series that originally premiered on Nickelodeon on April 7, 1985, after having been produced as a less costly and intensive alternative to PBS's National Geographic Specials by Pittsburgh station WQED. The first episode ("Herculaneum: Voices from the Past") was produced by WQED and featured long-time Explorer cameraman Mark Knobil, who is the few staff members with the franchise during all 24 seasons. The program is the longest-running documentary television series on cable television. Presented every Sunday from 5:00 pm to 8:00 pm, the original series was three hours in length, containing five to ten short films. Although the National Geographic Society had been producing specials for television for 20 years prior to Explorer, the premiere of the series required an increase in production from 4 hours of programming a year to 156 hours. Tim Cowling and Tim Kelly were the executive producers for the series during this transition.

In its 36 years on television, Explorer has worked for five television outlets. In February 1986, Explorer moved to TBS, where it had a successful run until September 1999, when it moved to CNBC. In October 2001, the series moved to MSNBC. In June 2003, the series was relaunched on MSNBC as Ultimate Explorer, with Lisa Ling as the host. On July 8, 2004, Explorer joined the National Geographic Channel.

National Geographic Explorer has earned more than 400 awards, including 52 Emmy Awards, 13 Cable ACE awards, the Family Television Award, the Genesis Award, the DuPont-Columbia Silver Baton Award, the Peabody Award, four gold medals at the International Film and Television Festival of New York, as well as being nominated for two Academy Awards.

The original Explorer series ended in 2011 and then was started again in 2015 with the help of original programming president Tim Pastore, hosted by British journalist Richard Bacon, with executive producers Lou Wallach, Jeff Hasler and Brian Lovett. The series is broadcast on National Geographic's 171 channels around the world. In 2018, Bacon was replaced by Phil Keoghan who is best known for hosting The Amazing Race.

== Plot / Format ==
Variety magazine described the series: "The new-model 'Explorer' is described as a weekly 'docu-talk' series that will feature magazine-style field reporting, celebrity guest and talk show segments shot in front of a studio audience."

== Background ==
National Geographic Specials were being produced by Pittsburgh station WQED for PBS.

== History ==
National Geographic Explorer began broadcasting in April 1985 on Nickelodeon. The following year, the show moved to TBS. Each episode was made by an independent production company with a National Geographic staffer serving as an associate producer. Local actor Bingo O'Malley was selected by Herculaneum: Voices from the Past producer Joe Seamans as host. Herculaneum was extended for broadcast on PBS in 1987 under the title, In the Shadow of Vesuvius.

The show bounced between CNBC (which was subject to interruptions in the fall and late spring/early summer due to World Series and NBA Finals postgames from NBC Sports), then MSNBC and finally National Geographic Channel. In April 2010, the show celebrated its 25 year with a special, "Explorer: 25 Years".

== Hosts / narrators ==
- David Greenan (1985)
- Tom Chapin (1985–1988)
- Robert Urich (1988–1995)
- Boyd Matson (1995–2003)
- Lisa Ling (2003–2010)
- Salvatore F Vecchio (2000-2014)
- Richard Bacon (2016)
- Jeff Goldblum (2017)
- Dan Rather (2017)
- Nick Schifrin (2017)
- Ted Danson (2017)
- Ali Wentworth (2017)
- Phil Keoghan (2018)

== Executive producers ==
- Tim Kelly
- Tim Cowling
- Tom Simon
- Michael Rosenfeld
- Patrick Prentice
- Jonathan Halperin
- Robert Zakin
- Lou Wallach,
- Jeff Hasler
- Brian Lovett
- Laura Glassman
- Drew Pulley

== Episodes ==
Episode list starting with the change in title to simply Explorer

=== Season 1 (2005) ===
- "Collapse", a forensic look at the chain of events leading up to some of the world's most fatal structural disasters, including the worst structural failure to take place in the U.S. prior to 9/11
- "Deadly Love", spider sex
- "Elephant Rage"
- "Hogzilla"
- "Inside Shock & Awe"
- "L.A. Future Quake"
- "Last Days of the Maya"
- "Mysteries of Survival", Pablo Valencia, Adirondack Mountains
- "Nightmare in Jamestown"
- "Pyramids of Fire"
- "Python vs. Gator"
- "Search for Adam"
- "Secrets of the Tornado"
- "Super Chopper"
- "Super Snake!"
- "Surviving Maximum Security"
- "The True Face of Hurricanes"
- "Violent Earth"
- "Witchcraft Murder"
- "World's Most Dangerous Gang"

=== Season 2 (2006) ===
- "Attack of the Killer Bees"
- "Doomsday Volcano"
- "Drowning New Orleans"
- "Fire Ants: Texas Border Massacre"
- "Inside North Korea"
- "Killer Cane Toads"
- "Outsmarting Terror"
- "Science of Surveillance"
- "Secret Lives of Jesus"
- "Super Rig"
- "Super Sub"
- "Supercarrier"
- "Ultimate Bear", black, brown, and polar bears
- "Ultimate Cat" lions, tigers and leopards
- "Ultimate Hippo"
- "Ultimate Shark"
- "World's Most Dangerous Drug"

=== Season 3 (2007) ===
- "Aryan Brotherhood"
- "China's Secret Mummies"
- "Heroin Crisis"
- "Inside Bethlehem"
- "Inside the Body Trade"
- "Iraq's Guns for Hire"
- "Jellyfish Invasion"
- "The Last Christians of Bethlehem"
- "Mammoth Mystery"
- "The Missing Years"
- "Science of Babies"
- "Science of Dogs"
- "Struck By Lightning"
- "Ultimate Crocodile"
- "Ultimate Viper"

=== Season 4 (2008) ===
- "Alaska's Last Oil"
- "Border Wars", Illegal immigration to the United States along the US-Mexico border, US Border Patrol
- "Congo Bush Pilots"
- "Death of the Iceman"
- "Finding Anastasia"
- "Gorilla Murders"
- "Inside Sumo"
- "Lost Cities of the Amazon"
- "Marijuana Nation"
- "Moment of Death"
- "Mystery of the Mummy Murders"
- "Science of Cats"
- "Science of Evil"
- "Secret History of Gold"
- "Shark Superhighway"
- "Testosterone Factor"
- "Tunnel to a Lost World"
- "Zoo Tiger Escape"

=== Season 5 (2009) ===
- "24 Hours After Asteroid Impact"
- "Child Mummy Sacrifice"
- "Chimps on the Edge"
- "Climbing Redwood Giants"
- "Easter Island Underworld"
- "Inside Death Row"
- "Inside Guantanamo Bay"
- "Inside LSD"
- "Italy's Mystery Mummies", Capuchin catacombs of Palermo, Catherine of Bologna, others
- "Monster Fish of the Congo"
- "Mystery of the Disembodied Feet"
- "Narco State"
- "Nazi Mystery"
- "Secret History of Diamonds"
- "Sex, Lies & Gender"
- "T-Rex Walks Again"
- "The Virus Hunters"

=== Season 6 (2010) ===
- "Camp Leatherneck"
- "DEA Takedown"
- "Electronic Armageddon", electromagnetic pulse warfare
- "Explorer: 25 Years"
- "Fatal Insomnia"
- "Inside the Nuclear Threat"
- "Journey to an Alien Moon"
- "Python Wars", and other invasive species
- "Solitary Confinement"
- "Talibanistan", the Taliban in Waziristan and rest of the border region
- "Vampire Forensics"
- "Nazi Mystery: Twins from Brazil", Joseph Mengele's experiments on twins revived in Brazil

=== Season 7 (2011) ===
- "American Hostage"
- "Lost Cannibals of Europe"
- "How to Build a Beating Heart"
- "Man vs Volcano"
- "Megapiranha"
- "Mystery of the Murdered Saints"
- "Stormagenddon"
- "Taking Down the Mob"
- "Crime Lords of Tokyo"
- "Gang War USA"
- "Murder in the Roman Empire"
- "Hostage Crises Massacre"
- "Psychic Gold Hunt"
- "To Catch a Smuggler"
- "Marijuana Gold Rush"
- "Guerrilla Gold Rush"

=== Season 8 (2015) ===
- "Warlords of Ivory"
- "Legend of the Monkey God"
- "Bill Nye's Global Meltdown"
- "The Cult of Mary"
- "Call of the Wild"
- "Eyes Wide Open"
- "Fighting ISIS"
- "Faces of Death"
- "Point of No Return"
- "Blood Antiquities"
- "Battle for Varunga"
- "What Would Teddy Do?", about Theodore Roosevelt

=== Season 9 (2016) ===
- "Episode 1" originally broadcast November 14, 2016 - host Richard Bacon, stories of death and features interviews with comedian Larry Wilmore and environmental activist Erin Brockovich.
- "Episode 2" originally broadcast November 21, 2016
- "Episode 3" originally broadcast November 28, 2016
- "Episode 4" originally broadcast December 5, 2016 - Russian gender camps, Uganda's Hollywood and blows up a bus for science, David Banner, Chris Kluwe and Gavin McInnes debate the meaning of manhood.
- "Episode 5" originally broadcast December 12, 2016
- "Episode 6" originally broadcast December 19, 2016

=== Season 10 (2017) ===
- "Episode 1" originally broadcast March 6, 2017
- "Episode 2" originally broadcast March 13, 2017 - host Aasif Mandvi, investigates US Terrorist watchlist
- "Episode 3" originally broadcast March 20, 2017 - host Nick Schifrin, interview with His Holiness the Dalai Lama
- "Episode 4" originally broadcast March 27, 2017
- "Episode 5" originally broadcast April 3, 2017 - host Dan Rather, Iceland's gene pool could unlock the cure to diseases like Alzheimer's; Ryan Duffy investigates the rhino horn black market.
- "Episode 6" originally broadcast April 10, 2017
- "Episode 7" originally broadcast April 17, 2017
- "Episode 8" originally broadcast April 24, 2017
- "Episode 9" originally broadcast May 1, 2017 - investigates Mexico's violent war on drugs, and looks into Oklahoma's disappearing cattle, plus actor and activist Mandy Patinkin.
- "Episode 10" originally broadcast May 8, 2017
- "Episode 11" originally broadcast May 15, 2017 - host Jeff Goldblum, in-depth look at Big Pharma, prescription drugs and the opioid epidemic.
- "Episode 12" originally broadcast May 22, 2017
- "Episode 13" originally broadcast May 29, 2017
- "Episode 14" originally broadcast June 5, 2017 - host Ted Danson about a rare surgical procedure. Plus why NASA's newest star, is a world-famous chef.
- "Episode 15" originally broadcast June 12, 2017 - host Ted Danson, growing illegal fish trade, plus executive director of Human Rights Watch Kenneth Roth.
- "Episode 16" originally broadcast June 19, 2017
- "Episode 17" originally broadcast June 26, 2017 - host Ali Wentworth, interview with civil rights pioneer the Rev. Jesse L. Jackson Sr.; investigation story of an Indian endurance runner Dharampal singh Gudha who may be 119 years old
