= 1828 in the United States =

- Decades: 1800s; 1810s; 1820s; 1830s; 1840s
- See also: History of the United States (1789–1849); Timeline of United States history (1820–1859); List of years in the United States

Events from the year 1828 in the United States.

== Incumbents ==
=== Federal government ===
- President: John Quincy Adams (DR/NR-Massachusetts)
- Vice President: John C. Calhoun (D-South Carolina)
- Chief Justice: John Marshall (Virginia)
- Speaker of the House of Representatives: Andrew Stevenson (D-Virginia)
- Congress: 20th

==== State governments ====
Governors and lieutenant governors

=== Governors ===
- Governor of Alabama: John Murphy (Democratic)
- Governor of Connecticut: Gideon Tomlinson (Democratic-Republican)
- Governor of Delaware: Charles Polk Jr. (Federalist)
- Governor of Georgia: John Forsyth (Democratic-Republican)
- Governor of Illinois: Ninian Edwards (Democratic-Republican)
- Governor of Indiana: James B. Ray (Independent)
- Governor of Kentucky: Joseph Desha (Democratic-Republican) (until August 26), Thomas Metcalfe (National Republican) (starting August 26)
- Governor of Louisiana: Henry Johnson (National Republican) (until December 15), Pierre Derbigny (National Republican) (starting December 15)
- Governor of Maine: Enoch Lincoln (Democratic-Republican)
- Governor of Maryland: Joseph Kent (Democratic-Republican)
- Governor of Massachusetts: Levi Lincoln Jr. (National Republican)
- Governor of Mississippi: Gerard Brandon (Democratic)
- Governor of Missouri: John Miller (Democratic)
- Governor of New Hampshire: Benjamin Pierce (Democratic-Republican) (until June 5), John Bell (National Republican) (starting June 5)
- Governor of New Jersey: Isaac Halstead Williamson (Federalist)
- Governor of New York:
  - until February 11: DeWitt Clinton (Democratic-Republican)
  - February 11-December 31: Nathaniel Pitcher (Democratic-Republican)
- Governor of North Carolina: James Iredell Jr. (Democratic-Republican) (until December 12), John Owen (Democratic) (starting December 12)
- Governor of Ohio: Allen Trimble (Federalist)
- Governor of Pennsylvania: John Andrew Shulze (Democratic-Republican)
- Governor of Rhode Island: James Fenner (Democratic-Republican)
- Governor of South Carolina: John Taylor (Democratic-Republican) (until December 10), Stephen Decatur Miller (Democratic) (starting December 10)
- Governor of Tennessee: Sam Houston (Democratic-Republican)
- Governor of Vermont: Ezra Butler (National Republican) (until October 10), Samuel C. Crafts (National Republican) (starting October 10)
- Governor of Virginia: William Branch Giles (Democratic)

=== Lieutenant governors ===
- Lieutenant Governor of Connecticut: John Samuel Peters (National Republican)
- Lieutenant Governor of Illinois: William Kinney (Democratic-Republican)
- Lieutenant Governor of Indiana: John H. Thompson (Democratic-Republican) (until December 3), Milton Stapp (Independent) (starting December 3)
- Lieutenant Governor of Kentucky: Robert B. McAfee (Democratic-Republican) (until August 26), John Breathitt (Democratic) (starting August 26)
- Lieutenant Governor of Massachusetts: Thomas L. Winthrop (Democratic-Republican)
- Lieutenant Governor of Mississippi: vacant (until month and day unknown), Abram M. Scott (Democratic) (starting month and day unknown)
- Lieutenant Governor of Missouri: vacant (until November 17), Daniel Dunklin (Democratic) (starting November 17)
- Lieutenant Governor of New York:
  - until February 11: Nathaniel Pitcher (Democratic-Republican)
  - February 11-October 17: Peter R. Livingston (Democratic-Republican)
  - October 17-end of December 31: Charles Dayan (Democratic-Republican)
- Lieutenant Governor of Rhode Island: Charles Collins (political party unknown)
- Lieutenant Governor of South Carolina: James Witherspoon (Democratic-Republican) (until December 10), Thomas Williams (Democratic) (starting December 10)
- Lieutenant Governor of Vermont: Henry Olin (Democratic-Republican)

== Events ==
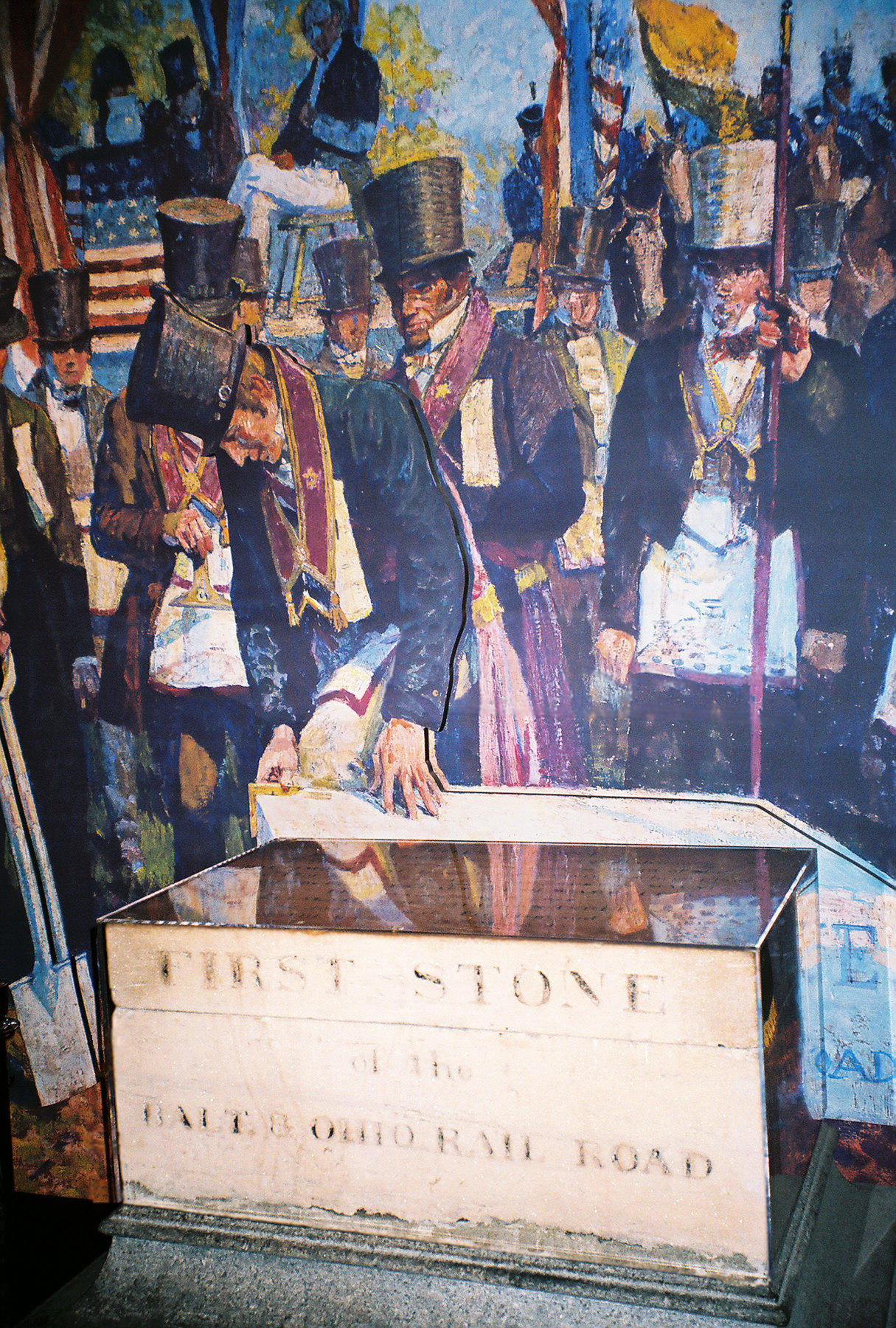
July 4: Construction of the Baltimore and Ohio Railroad begins

December 3: Jackson defeats President John Quincy Adams

- January 8 – Democratic Party is established.
- February 19 – The Boston Society for Medical Improvement is established.
- February 21 – The Cherokee Phœnix, the first newspaper published by Native Americans in the United States and in one of their indigenous languages (Cherokee), is first issued in New Echota.
- May 19 – The Tariff of 1828 is enacted. Critics name it the 'Tariff of Abominations' because they see it as unfairly protective of northern industry to the detriment of the southern economy.
- July 4 – Construction of the Baltimore and Ohio Railroad commences with a cornerstone laid by Charles Carroll of Carrollton.
- July 9 – The 1828–29 United States House of Representatives elections commence; they will increase the majority of the Jacksonian Democrats.
- August 11 – The Working Men's Party is founded in the City of Philadelphia, Pennsylvania as the 1st 'worker oriented' political party in the United States.
- October 27 – Gold is discovered by Benjamin Parks in or near Cherokee First Nation land in Hall County - later reorganized into Lumpkin County - in, Georgia.
- December 3 – 1828 United States presidential election: Challenger Andrew Jackson beats incumbent John Quincy Adams and is elected President of the United States.
- December 19 – A document written by U.S. Vice President John C. Calhoun, the South Carolina Exposition and Protest, is presented to the South Carolina House of Representatives protesting the 'Tariff of Abominations'.
- December 20 – The Georgia state legislature charters the Medical Academy of Georgia, which becomes the Medical College of Georgia, and authorizes it to award a Bachelor of Medicine degree, making it the 13th oldest U.S. medical school and the 6th public medical school to be established.

=== Undated ===
- White comedian Thomas D. Rice introduces blackface and the song "Jump Jim Crow" to American audiences.
- Noah Webster's American Dictionary of the English Language is published.
- A History of the Life and Voyages of Christopher Columbus, a novel by Washington Irving, is published and popularizes the common misconception that Europeans thought the Earth was flat prior to the explorations of Columbus.
- John Neal publishes Rachel Dyer, the first hardcover novelized version of the Salem witch trials story
- Two minor political parties are formed: The single-issue Anti-Masonic Party in upstate New York, and the Nullifier Party advocating states' rights in opposition to the 'Tariff of Abominations'.
- American Peace Society established.
- A ring spinning machine is developed in the U.S.

=== Ongoing ===
- 20th United States Congress

== Births ==
- January 2 – George M. Chilcott, U.S. Senator from Colorado from 1882 to 1883 (died 1891)
- January 28 – Thomas C. Hindman, U.S. Representative from Arkansas from 1859 to 1861 and Confederate general (murdered 1868)
- May 26 – Benjamin F. Rice, U.S. Senator from Arkansas from 1868 to 1873 (died 1905)
- March 24 – Horace Gray, Associate Justice of the Supreme Court of the United States (died 1902)
- April 28 – Richard Arnold, Union Army brigadier general (died 1882)
- June 2 – James Cutler Dunn Parker, organist and composer (died 1916)
- July 8 – David Turpie, U.S. Senator from Indiana in 1863 and from 1887 to 1899 (died 1909)
- July 14 – Jervis McEntee, painter of the Hudson River School (died 1891)
- August 6 – Andrew Taylor Still, "father of osteopathy" (died 1917)
- August 28 – William A. Hammond, military physician and neurologist, 11th Surgeon General of the U.S. Army from 1862 to 1864 (died 1900)
- September 8
  - Joshua Chamberlain, leader of the 20th Maine during the Civil War, Governor of Maine, President of Bowdoin College (died 1914)
  - Clarence Cook, art critic and writer (died 1900)
- October 19 – James F. Wilson, U.S. Senator from Iowa from 1883 to 1895 (died 1895)
- October 20 – Horatio Spafford, author of the hymn "It Is Well with My Soul" (died 1888)
- October 26 – William M. Robbins, U.S. Representative from North Carolina (died 1905)
- October 29 – Thomas F. Bayard, U.S. Senator from Delaware from 1869 to 1885 and U.S. Secretary of State from 1885 until 1889 (died 1898)
- November 17 – Milton Wright, bishop of the United Brethren Church and father of aviation pioneers the Wright brothers (died 1917)
- December 8 – Clinton B. Fisk, temperance leader (died 1890)

== Deaths ==
- February 11 – DeWitt Clinton, 6th Governor of New York, U.S. Senator (born 1769)
- March 25 – Maria Reynolds, mistress of Alexander Hamilton (born 1768)
- June 1 – Lyncoya Jackson, 2nd adopted son of Andrew Jackson (born c. 1811)
- June 6 – John Kinzie, Fur trader responsible for "the first murder in Chicago", when he killed Jean La Lime in 1812 (born December 23, 1763)
- July 9 – Gilbert Stuart, painter (born 1755)
- September 20 – George Bethune English, adventurer, marine and diplomat (born 1797)
- December 22 – Rachel Jackson, wife of Andrew Jackson (born 1767)
- Full date unknown – William Lee, personal servant and slave of George Washington (born 1750)

== See also ==
- Timeline of United States history (1820–1859)
