= 1826 in the United States =

- Decades: 1800s; 1810s; 1820s; 1830s; 1840s
- See also: History of the United States (1789–1849); Timeline of United States history (1820–1859); List of years in the United States

Events from the year 1826 in the United States.

== Incumbents ==
=== Federal government ===
- President: John Quincy Adams (DR/NR-Massachusetts)
- Vice President: John C. Calhoun (D-South Carolina)
- Chief Justice: John Marshall (Virginia)
- Speaker of the House of Representatives: John W. Taylor (DR-New York)
- Congress: 19th

==== State governments ====
Governors and lieutenant governors

=== Governors ===
- Governor of Alabama: John Murphy (Democratic)
- Governor of Connecticut: Oliver Wolcott Jr. (Toleration)
- Governor of Delaware: Samuel Paynter (Federalist)
- Governor of Georgia: George M. Troup (Democratic-Republican)
- Governor of Illinois: Edward Coles (Independent) (until December 6), Ninian Edwards (Democratic-Republican) (starting December 6)
- Governor of Indiana: James B. Ray (Independent)
- Governor of Kentucky: Joseph Desha (Democratic-Republican)
- Governor of Louisiana: Henry Johnson (National Republican)
- Governor of Maine: Albion K. Parris (Democratic-Republican)
- Governor of Maryland: Samuel Stevens Jr. (Democratic) (until January 9), Joseph Kent (Democratic-Republican) (starting January 9)
- Governor of Massachusetts: Levi Lincoln Jr. (National Republican)
- Governor of Mississippi:
  - until January 7: Gerard Brandon (Democratic)
  - January 7-July 25: David Holmes (Democratic)
  - starting July 25: Gerard Brandon (Democratic)
- Governor of Missouri: Abraham J. Williams (Democratic-Republican) (until January 20), John Miller (Democratic) (starting January 20)
- Governor of New Hampshire: David L. Morril (Democratic-Republican)
- Governor of New Jersey: Isaac Halstead Williamson (Federalist)
- Governor of New York: DeWitt Clinton (Democratic-Republican)
- Governor of North Carolina: Hutchins Gordon Burton (no political party)
- Governor of Ohio: Jeremiah Morrow (Democratic-Republican) (until December 19), Allen Trimble (Federalist) (starting December 19)
- Governor of Pennsylvania: John Andrew Shulze (Democratic-Republican)
- Governor of Rhode Island: James Fenner (Democratic-Republican)
- Governor of South Carolina: Richard Irvine Manning I (Democratic-Republican) (until December 9), John Taylor (Democratic-Republican) (starting December 9)
- Governor of Tennessee: William Carroll (Democratic-Republican)
- Governor of Vermont: Cornelius P. Van Ness (Democratic-Republican) (until October 13), Ezra Butler (National Republican) (starting October 13)
- Governor of Virginia: John Tyler (Democratic-Republican)

=== Lieutenant governors ===
- Lieutenant Governor of Connecticut: David Plant (National Republican)
- Lieutenant Governor of Illinois: Adolphus Hubbard (Democratic-Republican) (until December 6), William Kinney (Democratic-Republican) (starting December 6)
- Lieutenant Governor of Indiana: John H. Thompson (Democratic-Republican)
- Lieutenant Governor of Kentucky: Robert B. McAfee (political party unknown)
- Lieutenant Governor of Massachusetts: vacant (until month and day unknown), Thomas L. Winthrop (political party unknown) (starting month and day unknown)
- Lieutenant Governor of Mississippi:
  - until January 7: vacant
  - January 7-July 25: Gerard C. Brandon (no political party)
  - starting July 25: vacant
- Lieutenant Governor of Missouri: vacant
- Lieutenant Governor of New York: James Tallmadge Jr. (Democratic-Republican) (until end of December 31)
- Lieutenant Governor of Rhode Island: Charles Collins (political party unknown) (starting month and day unknown)
- Lieutenant Governor of South Carolina: William Bull (Democratic-Republican) (until December 9), James Witherspoon (Democratic-Republican) (starting December 9)
- Lieutenant Governor of Vermont: Aaron Leland (Democratic-Republican)

== Events ==
- January 24 – Treaty of Washington between the United States government and the Creek National Council, in which they cede much of their land in the State of Georgia.
- February 6 – First printing of James Fenimore Cooper's novel The Last of the Mohicans, in Philadelphia.
- February 13 – The American Temperance Society is founded in Boston.
- March – Aged eight, future orator and memoirist Frederick Douglass is lent by his master to the Aulds of Fell's Point, Baltimore. He will remain their house servant, and later their regular slave, for 12 years until he escapes.
- April 1 – Samuel Morey patents an internal combustion engine.
- July 4 – Ex-Presidents Thomas Jefferson and John Adams both die on the 50th anniversary of the signing of the Declaration of Independence.
- July 15 – The Pan-American Congress of Panama concludes without the U.S. delegates having arrived.
- August – The town of Crawford Notch, New Hampshire suffers a landslide; those killed include the Willey Family, after whom Mount Willey is named.
- September 3 – The USS Vincennes, commanded by William Finch, leaves New York City to become the first U.S. warship to circumnavigate the globe.
- September 11 – William Morgan is arrested in Batavia, New York, for debt after declaring that he would publish The Mysteries of Free Masonry, a book against Freemasonry. This sets into motion the events that led to his mysterious disappearance.
- September 17 – Ohio River slave rebellion: Slave traders Ned Stone, David Cobb, and three others are killed by their prisoners.
- October 7 – The first train operates over the Granite Railway in Massachusetts.
- December 21 – Fredonian Rebellion: American settlers in Mexican Texas make the first attempt to secede from Mexico, establishing the Republic of Fredonia, which will survive for just over a month.
- December 25 – The Eggnog Riot breaks out at the United States Military Academy in West Point, New York during the early morning hours, but is squelched by Christmas chapel service.
- Sing Sing prison first opened on the Hudson River.

== Births ==
- January 5 – Samuel L. M. Barlow I, lawyer (died 1889)
- January 26 – Julia Grant, born Julia Boggs Dent, First Lady as wife of Ulysses S. Grant, 18th president of the U.S. (died 1902)
- January 27 – Richard Taylor, Confederate general (died 1879)
- February 9 – John A. Logan, U.S. Senator from Illinois from 1871 to 1877 (died 1886)
- February 16 – James Calder, 5th president of the Pennsylvania State University (died 1893)
- February 22 – Samuel J. R. McMillan, U.S. Senator from Minnesota from 1875 to 1887 (died 1897)
- March 4 – Theodore Judah, railroad engineer (died 1863)
- April 9 – Francis B. Stockbridge, U.S. Senator from Michigan from 1887 to 1894 (died 1894)
- April 26
  - George Hull Ward, general (died 1863)
  - Ambrose R. Wright, general, lawyer, and politician (died 1872)
- May 4 – Frederic Edwin Church, painter (died 1900)
- May 7 – Varina Davis, wife of Jefferson Davis, First Lady of the Confederate States of America (died 1906)
- July 4 – Stephen Foster, songwriter (died 1864)
- August 16 – Mary Cyrene Burch Breckinridge, wife of John C. Breckinridge, Second Lady of the United States (died 1907)
- September 1 – Alfred Ely Beach, inventor and publisher (died 1896)
- September 4 – Willard Warner, U.S. Senator from Alabama from 1868 to 1871 (died 1906)
- September 18 – Celia M. Burleigh, women's rights activist and Unitarian pastor (died 1875)
- October 7 – William B. Bate, 23rd Governor of Tennessee from 1883 to 1887 and U.S. Senator from Tennessee from 1887 to 1905 (died 1905)
- October 20 – James Z. George, U.S. Senator from Mississippi from 1881 to 1897 (died 1897)
- October 31 – Joseph Roswell Hawley, U.S. Senator from Connecticut from 1881 to 1905 (died 1905)
- December 3 – George B. McClellan, soldier, civil engineer, railroad executive, and politician (died 1885)
- December 7 – Edmund G. Ross, U.S. Senator from Kansas from 1866 to 1871 (died 1907)

== Deaths ==
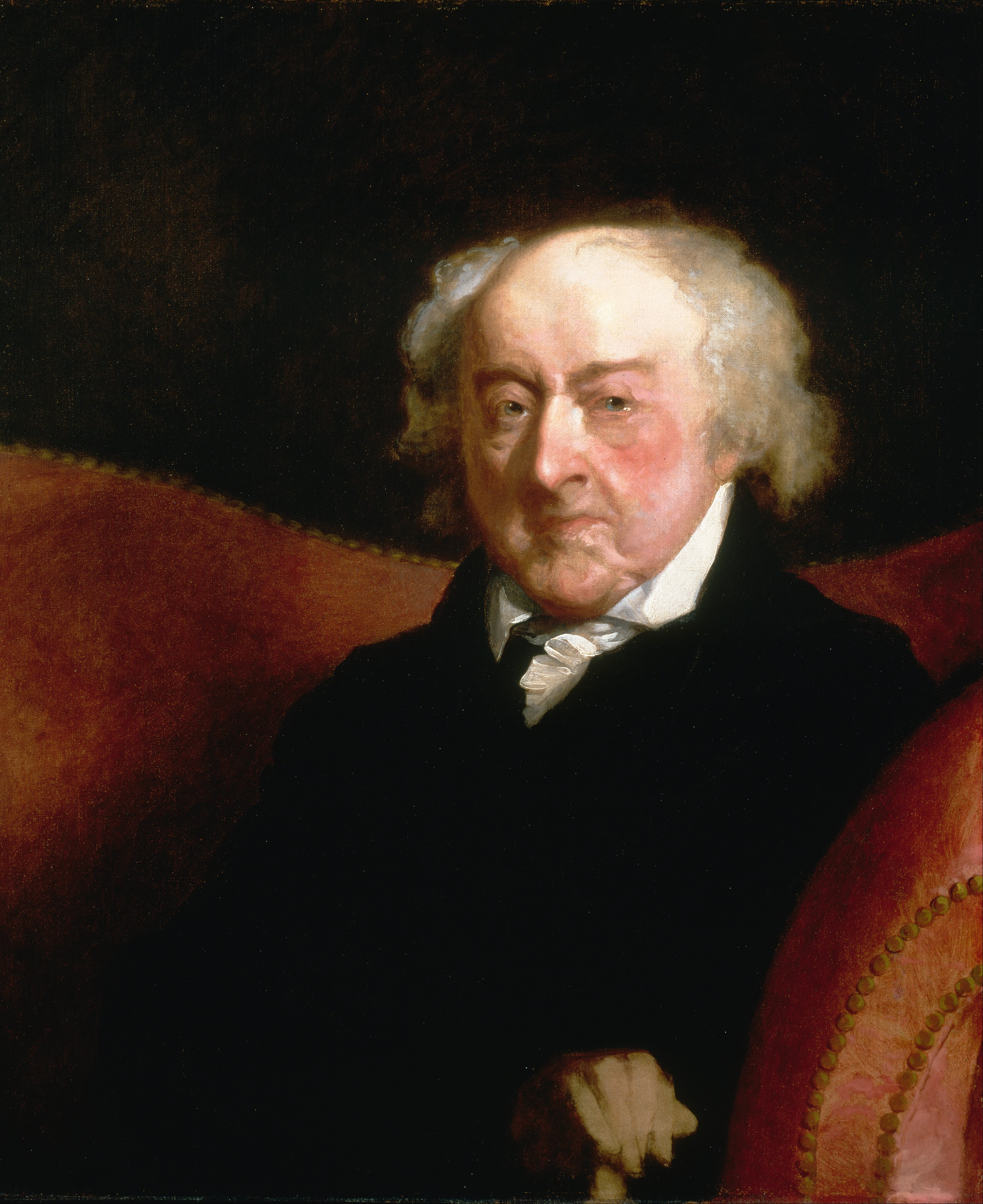
John Adams, 2nd president of the United States (1797–1801)

Thomas Jefferson, 3rd president of the United States (1801–1809)

Two U.S. presidents (who also served as Vice President) died on the same day of July 4, 1826
- January 24 – Henry H. Chambers, U.S. Senator from Alabama from 1825 to 1826 (born 1790)
- February 7 – Thomas Todd, Associate Justice of the U.S. Supreme Court from 1807 to 1826 (born 1765)
- July 4
  - John Adams, second president of the United States from 1797 to 1801, first vice president of the United States from 1789 to 1797 (born 1735)
  - Thomas Jefferson, third president of the United States from 1801 to 1809, second vice president of the United States from 1797 to 1801 (born 1743)
- July 8 – Luther Martin, delegate to the American Constitutional Convention (born 1746)
- July 18 – Issac Shelby, first and fifth Governor of Kentucky from 1792 to 1796 and 1812 to 1816 (born 1750)
- August 26 – Royall Tyler, playwright (born 1757)

== See also ==
- Timeline of United States history (1820–1859)
