= Dharampal Singh Gudha =

Indian marathon runner

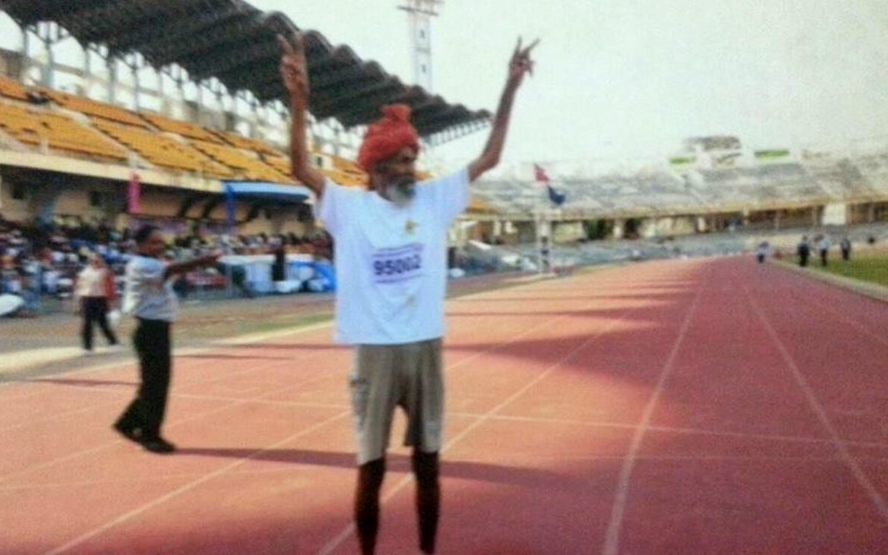
- Dharampal Singh Gujjar Gudha after finishing his race
- Born: Meerut, India
- Occupation: Farmer
- Known for: Claiming to be the oldest running athlete in the world at 120

Dharampal Singh Gudha, also known as Dharam Pal Singh or Dharampal Singh Gujjar, is an Indian runner who has controversially claimed to be the world's oldest marathon runner at 120.

== Life ==
Gudha claims to have been born on 6 October 1897, comes from the village of Gudha, Meerut, and is a farmer by occupation. He claims to have been running since he was a teenager.

"When I was young, I used to run from my village to the neighboring village, which was about 600 to 700 meters away. I would run several laps. I did not know how to run then, the technique of it, but I did it on instinct," he says. He gets up at 4 am and runs four kilometers daily. He takes part in Inter-State level races for Veterans in the 100, 200- and 400-meter categories. To date, Gujjar has taken part in more than three dozen races in different parts of the country.

Gudha has lost count of the number of marathons that he has run. However, he recollects running at marathons in Allahabad, Nainital, Uttarakhand and Chandigarh, and claims to have run in 50 others. He states that he ran his first marathon in 1970.

In 2017, National Geographic did a special episode in their Explorer series investigating his life and success as a runner at such an advanced age.

When asked about his continued fitness, he says it is all about having a controlled diet. He has led a strict healthy lifestyle since childhood. He gives credit to his balanced diet of self-prepared chutney along with mineral water and lemon juice for his longevity. "I eat a strict and balanced diet and have no illness. I stopped eating ghee and other fatty items almost 40 years ago, neither do I drink or smoke," he said. He has been a strict vegetarian since birth.

== Film ==
An American film director, David Freid, has made a documentary on DharamPal Singh Gujjar, The Never-Ending Marathon of Mr. Dharam Singh, in 2017.

== Controversy ==
Gudha's claims of being 120 years old has generated much controversy. While Gudha refers to his passport, voter ID Card and PAN card [a tax identification in India]—all stating 1897 as his year of birth, and all three government of India-issued valid identity documents—asserting he is 120 years old, he does not have a birth certificate to prove this age.

It has been suggested that Gudha has an old voter ID that has not been corrected in order to "hide his age". Yet, with the passport and PAN card corroborating the birth date and hence his story, there is no certainty.

Kurt Kaschke, president of European Masters Athletics, expressed the difficulty with proving ages of people in a certain age group. In a letter to Ken Stone, editor and founder of MasterTrack, Kaschke outlined some of the difficulties officials face in verifying the ages of some of their oldest runners: "Was a birth certificate valid if the original no longer existed? What should be done about athletes born during the First or Second World War, when many records were destroyed? How could a birth date be proved when a government was not able to verify a birth on a particular day? Or when a country did not issue birth certificates?" This is a problem commonly faced by competitors from countries of Africa and Asia, including India.

== Awards ==
Gudha has won more than 20 medals in national and international athletic events in his age category, including a gold medal in the Malaysian Championships in 2014.
