= Asahel C. Beckwith =

American politician (1827–1896)

Asahel Collins Beckwith (1827–1896) was an American senator. A Democrat from Wyoming, he was born in Mentor, Ohio, and was appointed to serve in Washington from 1893 to 1895 in the 53rd United States Congress, but his resignation due to investigation prevented him from taking office.

Appointed by the governor to fill a vacancy in the term beginning March 4, 1893, caused by failure of the state legislature to elect him to office, Beckwith took his seat February 6, 1895. Beckwith presented credentials as a Senator-designate March 15, 1893 (special session of the Senate), but was not sworn pending investigation of his right to the seat. He resigned July 11, 1893, before final action was taken by the Senate. The seat was vacant from March 4, 1893, to January 22, 1895.
