= Roy Nelson (cartoonist) =

American cartoonist

Roy Nelson (May 17, 1905 – September 14, 1956) was a cartoonist and caricaturist. His talent for drawing was recognized at an early age, and after high school in Virginia, Minnesota, he was accepted into the Chicago Academy of Fine Arts (1922-1925). After graduation, Roy joined the staff of The Chicago Daily News as an artist-reporter, contributing caricatures, cartoons and comics. He created caricatures of many celebrities who visited Chicago.

During this period, Roy also contributed many cartoons to Esquire magazine starting with the first issue in October 1933.

Roy left the Chicago Daily News briefly in the early 1930s and joined the staff of The Walt Disney Studios, producing publicity artwork and assisting in drawing the daily Mickey Mouse newspaper strip. After several months he returned to Chicago and the Daily News.

Roy worked for the Chicago Daily News for over 14 years before entering the Army in 1943. He served for 2 1/2 years, stationed in southern California creating illustrations for army training books, and after the end of the war returned to the Chicago Daily News.

In 1950, Roy married Marcella Colberg and returned to his home town in Virginia, Minnesota for one year where he resumed his career as a cartoonist, working freelance for various clients including The Sporting News, Hearst Newspapers and Saalfield books. In 1951 they moved to Sarasota, Florida for one year, creating a daily cartoon strip called Dot, Mot and Tot. After they moved to Minneapolis, MN, Roy created a series of children's coloring books. Three years after their marriage, Roy was diagnosed with lung cancer and entered a VA hospital for treatment. Roy died in 1956 as reported in the Tower News upon Marcella's recent death (March 2011).

Roy Nelson's work is currently showcased on the webpage Cartoonretro.com. Cartoonretro president Shane Glines, author of Tophats and Flappers: The Art of Russell Patterson, is currently writing a major monograph on the life and work of Roy Nelson titled Roy Nelson: The Art of Appeal.
