= Tarzan Woltzen =

American basketball player

Personal information
- Born: June 29, 1905 Roanoke, Illinois, U.S.
- Died: July 21, 1995 (aged 90) East Peoria, Illinois, U.S.
- Listed height: 6 ft 3 in (1.91 m)

Career information
- High school: Roanoke (Roanoke, Illinois)
- College: Gallagher Business School (1924–1925); Bradley (1925–1928)
- Position: Guard / forward

Career history
- 1937–1938: Kankakee Gallagher Trojans

Gaylord Theodor "Tarzan" Woltzen (June 29, 1905 – July 21, 1995) was an American professional basketball player. He played college basketball for Bradley University in the mid-1920s before playing in the National Basketball League. In the NBL, Woltzen played for the Kankakee Gallagher Trojans during the 1937–38 season but did not score a single point in eight career games.

== Career statistics ==
Legend
GP	Games played	FGM	Field goals made
FTM	Free throws made	FTA	Free throws attempted
FT%	Free throw percentage	PTS	Total points
PPG	Points per game	**Bold**	Career high

=== NBL ===
==== Regular season ====
Year	Team	GP	FGM	FTM	PTS	PPG
1937–38	Kankakee	8	0	0	0	.0
