= Sally Childs =

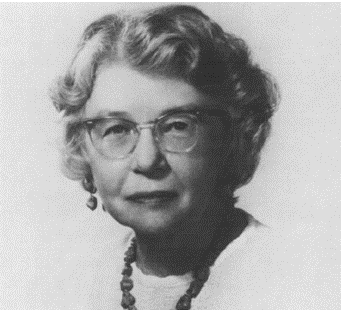
Sally Childs

Sally Burwell Childs (June 10, 1905 – January 2, 1988) was a language training specialist, with an emphasis on furthering the research on dyslexia and educating dyslexic students. Childs, along with several colleagues, opened an organization to help create dyslexia awareness called The Orton Society (later renamed International Dyslexia Association), in 1949, and she held the position as vice-president from 1959 to 1965. She published several educational books for dyslexia and was recognized for her accomplishments in 1973 with the Samuel T. Orton Award.

== Personal life ==
Sally Burwell McCall was born on June 10, 1905, in New York City. At the age of sixteen, she began teaching in a summer church school program, and graduated from the Ethical Culture School in New York. She then went on to Columbia University, where she obtained a bachelor's degree in education. She remained in New York and taught in the New York public school system from 1945 through 1964. On August 1, 1925, McCall married Ralph Childs and together they had twin daughters, Sarah and Elizabeth.

== Career ==
When one daughter began to stutter, Childs contacted Anna Gillingham, one of her teachers from the Ethical Culture School. After Gillingham observed both of the Childs children, she diagnosed them with a specific language disability. Childs became interested in this learning disorder and, under the supervision of Anna Gillingham and Bessie Stillman, she began conducting her own research on dyslexia.

When one of her mentors, Dr. Samuel T. Orton, died in 1948, Childs and some of her colleagues began The Orton Society, to further the research, education, and treatment of dyslexia. Childs was voted in as the vice-president in 1959, and she held that title until 1965. She opened the Dallas branch of The Orton Society, and co-founded the New York branch. While she was vice-president, Childs established the Anna Gillingham Fund, a fund to acknowledge Anna Gillingham's contributions to education and to help fund teacher training of dyslexic students. Sally was also the recipient of the 1973 Samuel T. Orton Award, for her “outstanding work in the field of specific language disabilities”.

When Ms. Gillingham died, Mrs. Childs took over the supervision of her training programs, and later developed further training programs herself. She also published several books, including Sound Phonics^{1}, Sound Spelling^{2}, The Childs Spelling Rules^{3}, Magic Squares^{4}, and The Childs Phonics Proficiency Scales^{5}. The Sally B. Childs Fund formed in her name in 1987, which established help to fund teachers that could not afford the training for teaching dyslexic students.
