= Pablo Valencia =

American prospector

Pablo Valencia, a prospector, is remembered primarily for his extraordinarily close brush with death in August 1905. Valencia, on the route with one Jesús Rios to an Arizona claim, realized belatedly that they had not brought enough water to sustain themselves, and sent his companion to secure more. Rios did so, but afterwards could not find his partner for want of an agreed-upon meeting place. Valencia consequently found himself alone and waterless in the middle of the Sonoran Desert. In this state, he wandered and crawled for eight days with nothing but his own urine and what moisture he could coax from a single scorpion to drink, growing ever weaker. More dead than alive, he eventually reached the only source of water for miles in any direction, Tinajas Altas. There he was nursed back to health by W. J. McGee, who wrote of his ordeal in a paper, "Desert Thirst as Disease."

One of the reasons to which his survival is attributed is his belief that Rios had abandoned him to die on purpose, and his resolute desire for revenge.

== See also ==
- Dehydration
- Sonoran Desert
- W. J. McGee
