= John H. Thompson (politician) =

American politician

4th Lieutenant Governor of Indiana
- In office December 7, 1825 – December 3, 1828
- Governor: William Hendricks; James B. Ray
- Preceded by: Ratliff Boon
- Succeeded by: Milton Stapp

Personal details
- Born: 1780 Westmoreland County, Pennsylvania
- Died: 26 March 1870 (aged 89–90) Indianapolis, Marion County, Indiana
- Party: Democratic-Republican, Democratic

John H. Thompson was an American politician who served as the fourth Lieutenant Governor of Indiana from 1824 to 1828.

Thompson was born in 1780 in Westmoreland County, Pennsylvania. In 1820, he was a member of the Electoral College, voting for James Monroe. From 1824 to 1828, Thompson served as Lieutenant Governor under William Hendricks and James B. Ray. In 1828, Thompson ran for a seat in the U.S. House of Representatives. His candidacy was supported by Jacksonian Democrats but he lost the election to former Governor Jonathan Jennings. In 1830, Thompson ran as an independent for the same seat, joining a crowded field that also included Jennings, John Carr, William W. Wick, James B. Ray, and Isaac Howk. Thompson lost the race, coming in fifth place. In 1839, Thompson ran as a Democrat against fellow Democrat Johnathan McCarty and Whig James Rariden for the U.S. House seat of Indiana's 5th congressional district. Thompson lost the election to Rariden.

From 1845 to 1849, Thompson served as the Indiana Secretary of State.

John Handley Thompson died 26 March 1870 in Indianapolis, Marion County, Indiana. He was interred at Crown Hill Cemetery, Indianapolis, Marion County, Indiana.
