= 1826 Connecticut gubernatorial election =

- April 13, 1826
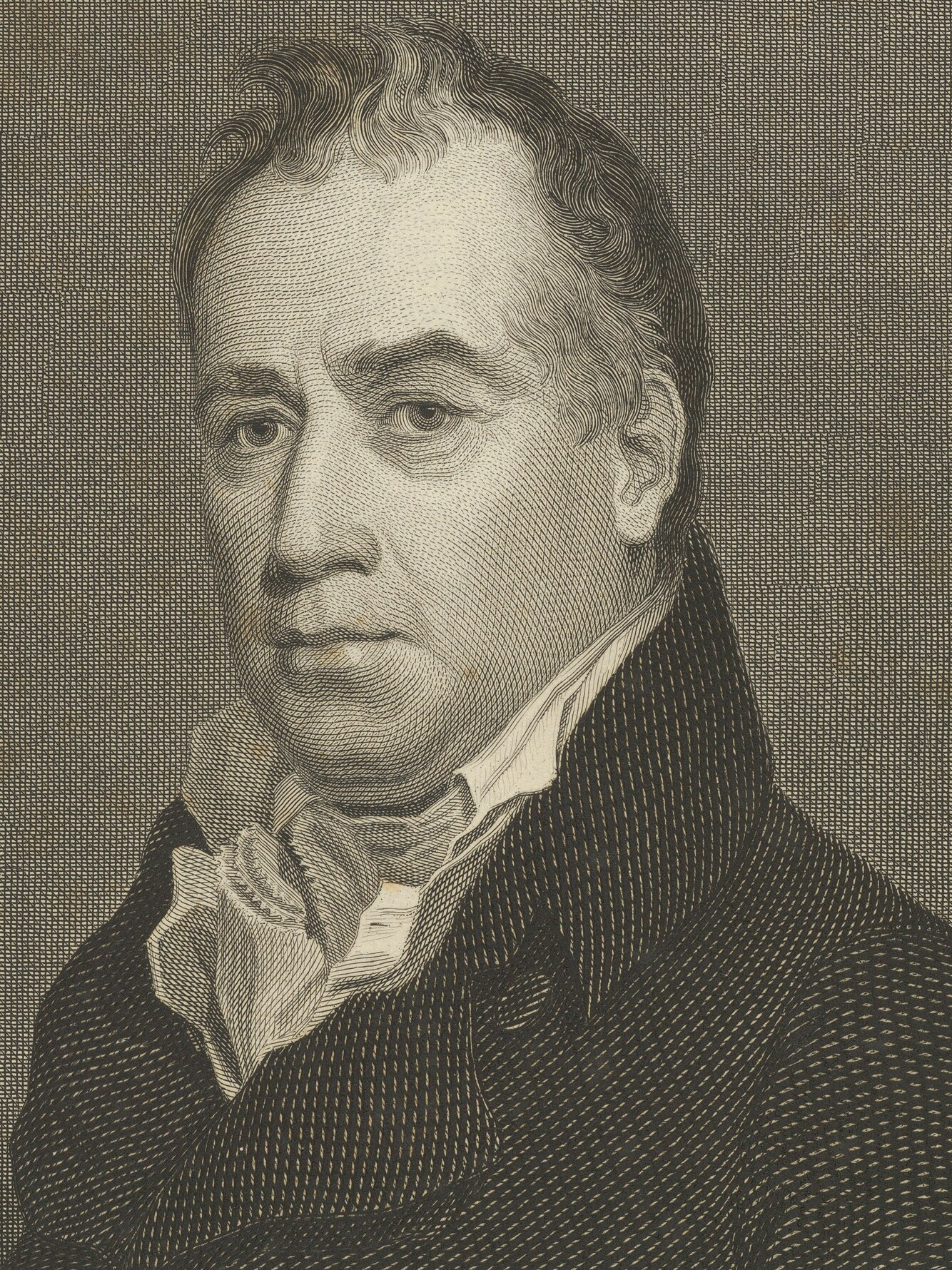

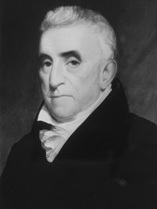
Nominee	Oliver Wolcott Jr.	David Daggett
Party	Toleration	Federalist
Popular vote	6,780	4,340
Percentage	56.77%	36.34%
- Wolcott: 30–40% 40–50% 50–60% 60–70% 70–80% 80–90% >90% Daggett: 30–40% 40–50% 50–60% 60–70% 70–80% 80–90% Plant: 80–90% Smith: 60–70%
Governor before election
Oliver Wolcott Jr.
Toleration
Elected Governor
Oliver Wolcott Jr.
Toleration

The 1826 Connecticut gubernatorial election was held on April 13, 1826. Incumbent governor and Toleration Party candidate Oliver Wolcott Jr. defeated former senator and Federalist Party candidate David Daggett, winning with 56.77% of the vote.

== General election ==
=== Candidates ===
Major candidates

- Oliver Wolcott Jr., Toleration
- David Daggett, Federalist

Minor candidates

- David Plant, Jacksonian
- Timothy Pitkin, Federalist
- Nathan Smith, Federalist

=== Results ===
1826 Connecticut gubernatorial election
Party	Candidate	Votes	%	±%
Toleration	Oliver Wolcott Jr. (incumbent)	6,780	56.77%	
Federalist	David Daggett	4,340	36.34%	
Jacksonian	David Plant	350	2.93%	
Other	Others	209	1.75%	
Federalist	Timothy Pitkin	148	1.24%	
Federalist	Nathan Smith	116	0.97%	
Majority		2,440		
Turnout				
Toleration hold		Swing		
