= 1827 Connecticut gubernatorial election =

- April 12, 1827
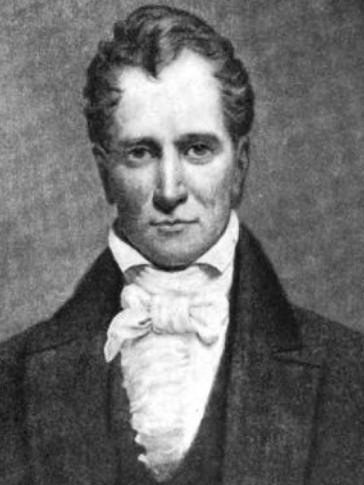

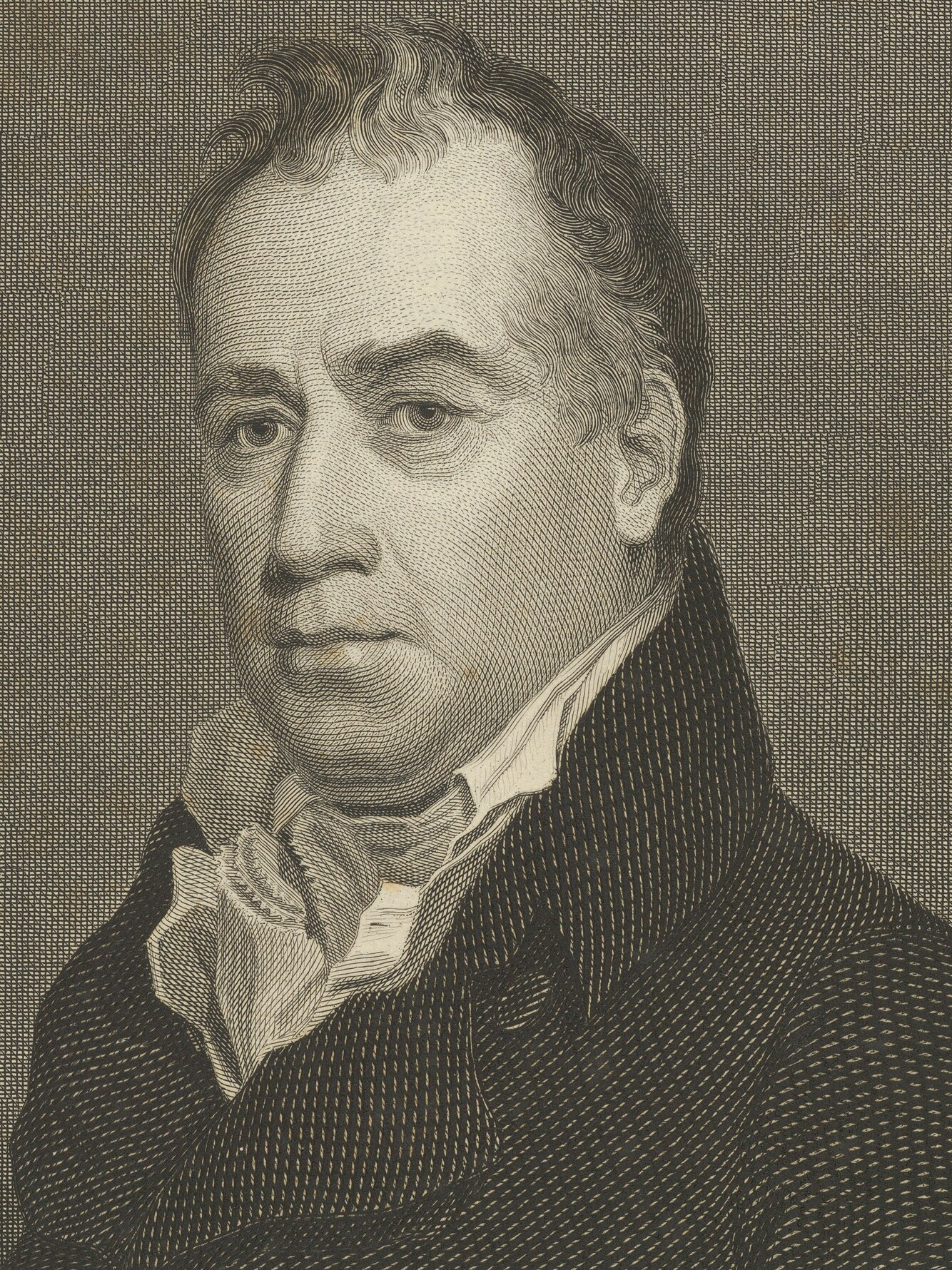
Nominee	Gideon Tomlinson	Oliver Wolcott Jr.
Party	Democratic-Republican	Toleration
Popular vote	7,681	5,295
Percentage	56.71%	39.09%
- Tomlinson: 40–50% 50–60% 60–70% 70–80% 80–90% 90–100% Wolcott: 40–50% 50–60% 60–70% 70–80% 80–90% 90–100% Tie: 40–50%
Governor before election
Oliver Wolcott Jr.
Toleration
Elected Governor
Gideon Tomlinson
Democratic-Republican Party (Tomlinson Faction)

The 1827 Connecticut gubernatorial election was held on April 12, 1827. Former congressman, speaker and Democratic-Republican candidate Gideon Tomlinson defeated incumbent governor and Toleration Party candidate Oliver Wolcott Jr., winning with 56.71% of the vote.

The Democratic-Republicans in Connecticut had grown tired of governor Wolcott, and wished to replace him. They nominated Tomlinson instead, and Tomlinson fended off a challenge from Wolcott and his supporters.

== General election ==
=== Candidates ===
Major candidates

- Gideon Tomlinson, Democratic-Republican, Tomlinson Faction
- Oliver Wolcott Jr., Toleration

Minor candidates

- David Daggett, Federalist
- Timothy Pitkin, Federalist

=== Results ===
1827 Connecticut gubernatorial election
Party	Candidate	Votes	%	±%
Democratic-Republican	Gideon Tomlinson	7,681	56.71%	
Toleration	Oliver Wolcott Jr. (incumbent)	5,295	39.09%	
Other	Others	233	1.72%	
Federalist	David Daggett	175	1.29%	
Federalist	Timothy Pitkin	161	1.19%	
Majority		2,386		
Turnout				
Democratic-Republican gain from Toleration				
