= 1821 Connecticut gubernatorial election =

- April 12, 1821
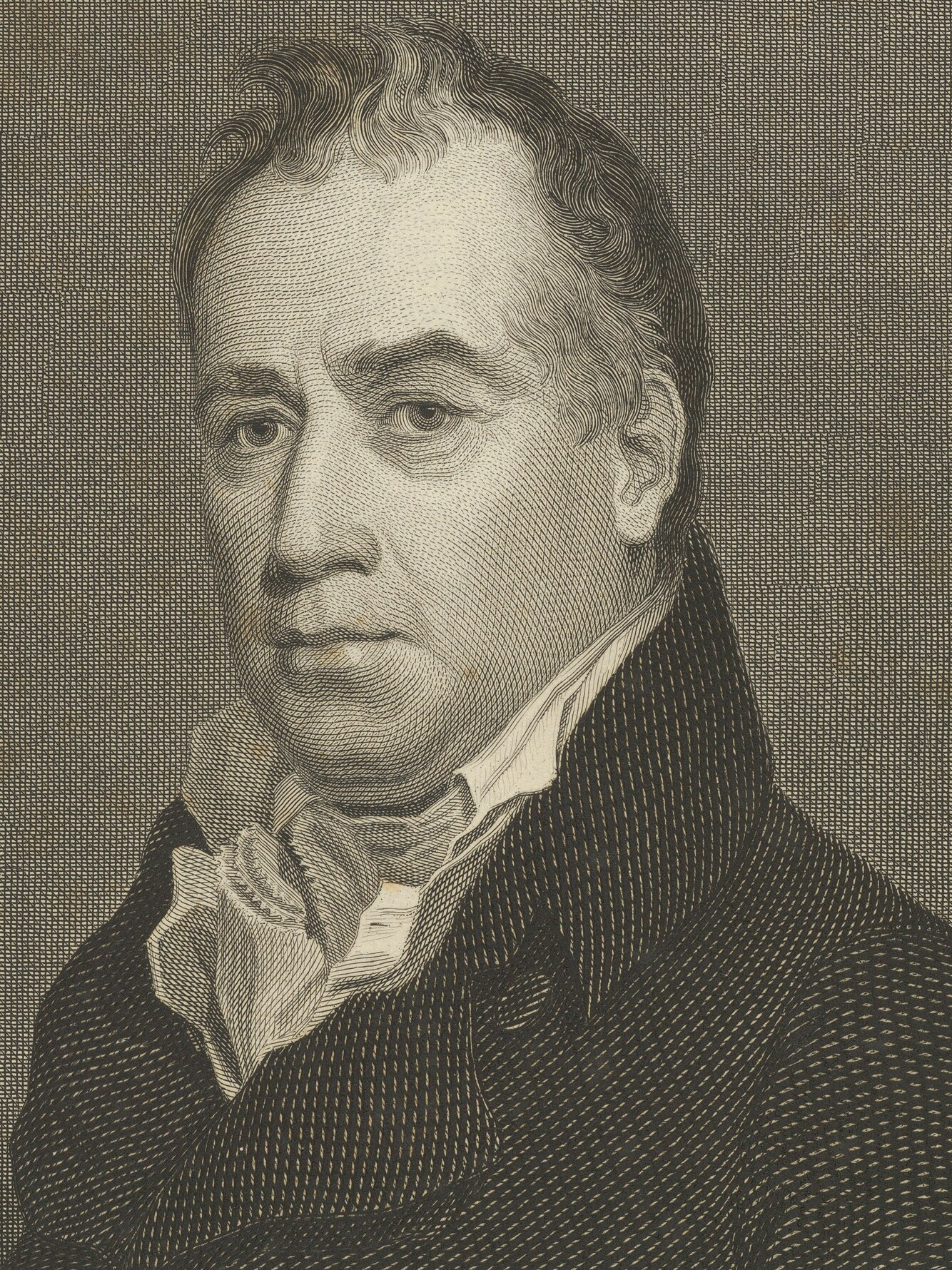
Nominee	Oliver Wolcott Jr.
Party	Toleration
Popular vote	10,064
Percentage	86.91%
- Wolcott: 40–50% 50–60% 60–70% 70–80% 80–90% 90–100% Boardman: 50–60% Pitkin: 50–60% 60–70% Ingersol: 60–70% No Data/Vote
Governor before election
Oliver Wolcott Jr.
Toleration
Elected Governor
Oliver Wolcott Jr.
Toleration

The 1821 Connecticut gubernatorial election was held on April 12, 1821. Incumbent governor and Toleration Party candidate Oliver Wolcott Jr. was re-elected, winning with 86.91% of the vote.

== General election ==
=== Candidates ===
Major candidates

- Oliver Wolcott Jr., Toleration

Minor candidates

- Timothy Pitkin, Federalist
- Nathan Smith, Federalist

=== Results ===
1821 Connecticut gubernatorial election
Party	Candidate	Votes	%	±%
Toleration	Oliver Wolcott Jr. (incumbent)	10,064	86.91%	
Other	Others	714	6.17%	
Federalist	Timothy Pitkin	513	4.43%	
Federalist	Nathan Smith	289	2.50%	
Majority		9,350		
Turnout				
Toleration hold		Swing		
