= 1825 Connecticut gubernatorial election =

- April 14, 1825
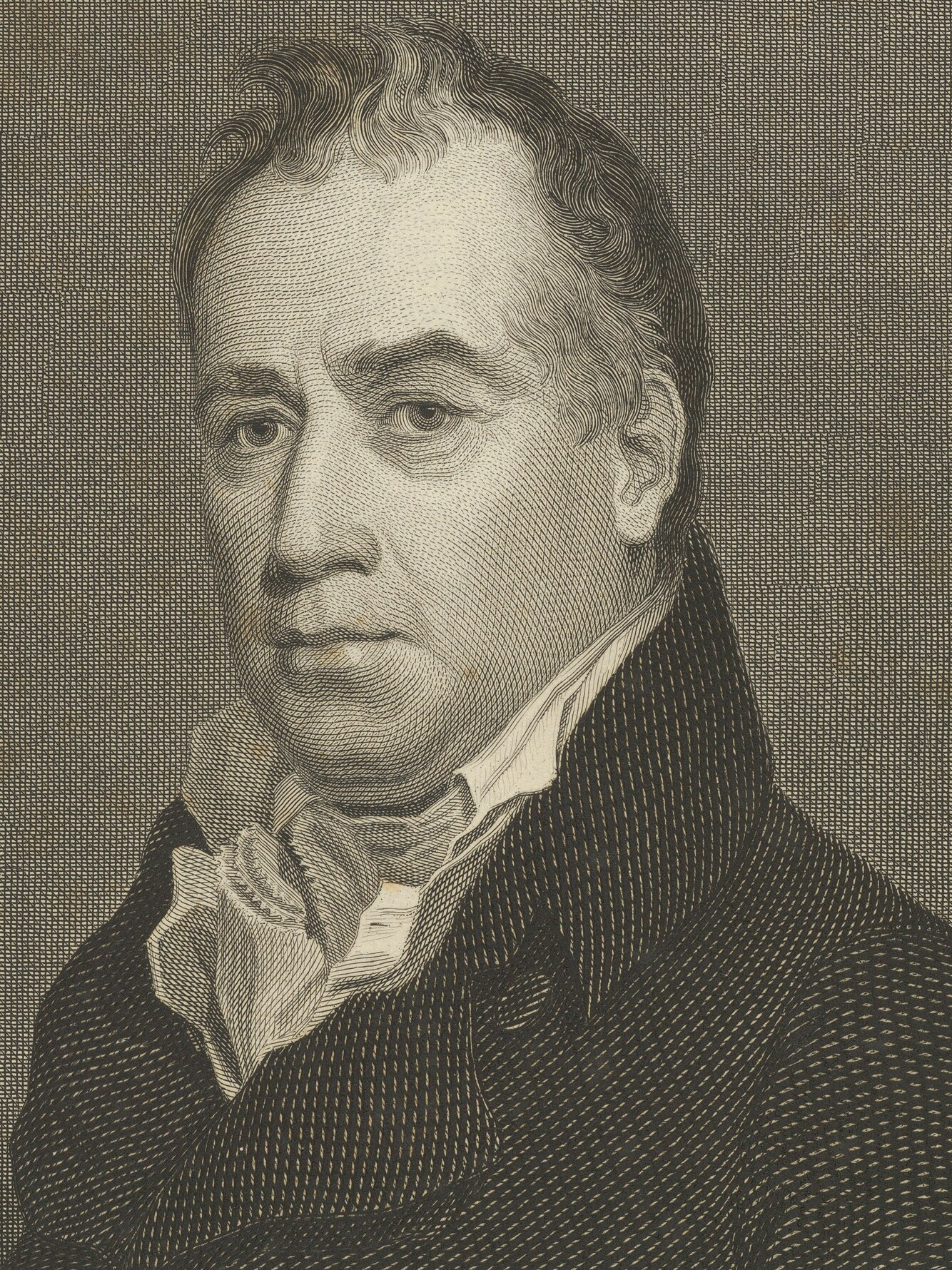

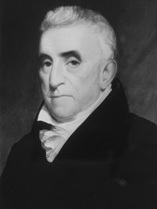

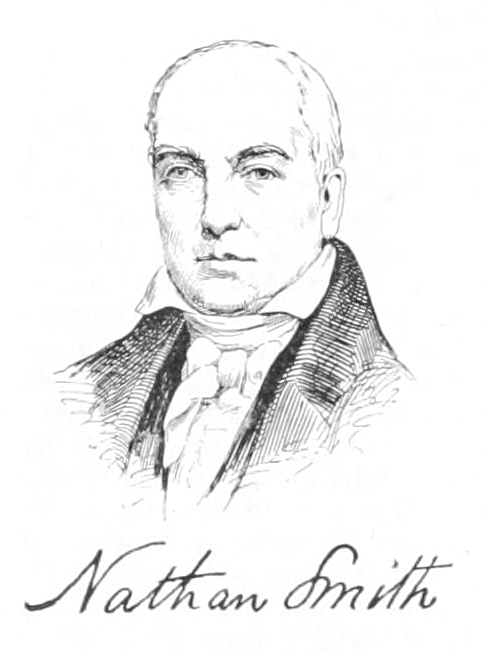

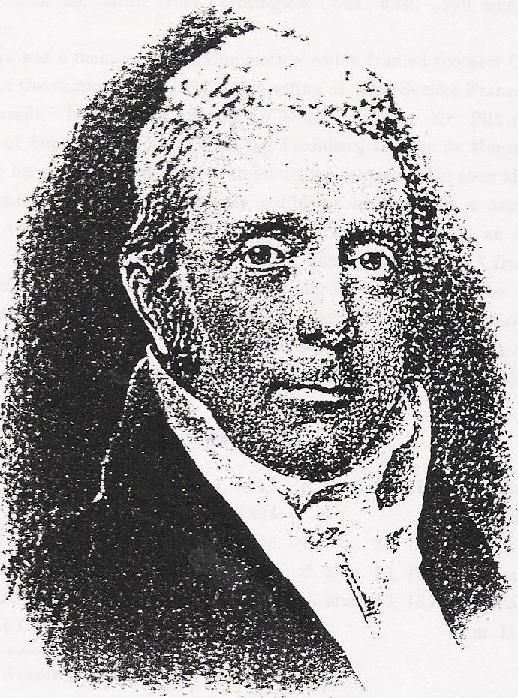
Nominee	Oliver Wolcott Jr.	David Daggett
Party	Toleration	Federalist
Popular vote	7,147	1,342
Percentage	68.82%	12.92%
Nominee	Nathan Smith	Timothy Pitkin
Party	Federalist	Federalist
Popular vote	863	525
Percentage	8.31%	5.06%
- Wolcott: 40–50% 50–60% 60–70% 70–80% 80–90% 90–100% Daggett: 30–40% 40–50% 50–60% 60–70% Smith: 50–60% 60–70% Pitkin: 40–50% 50–60% 70–80% Plant: 30–40% 60–70% Tie: 40–50% No Data/Vote
Governor before election
Oliver Wolcott Jr.
Toleration
Elected Governor
Oliver Wolcott Jr.
Toleration

The 1825 Connecticut gubernatorial election was held on April 14, 1825. Incumbent governor and Toleration Party candidate Oliver Wolcott Jr. defeated Federalist Party candidates former senator David Daggett, former delegate Nathan Smith and former congressman Timothy Pitkin, winning with 68.82% of the vote.

== General election ==
=== Candidates ===
Major candidates

- Oliver Wolcott Jr., Toleration
- David Daggett, Federalist
- Nathan Smith, Federalist
- Timothy Pitkin, Federalist

Minor candidates

- David Plant, Jacksonian

=== Results ===
1825 Connecticut gubernatorial election
Party	Candidate	Votes	%	±%
Toleration	Oliver Wolcott Jr. (incumbent)	7,147	68.82%	
Federalist	David Daggett	1,342	12.92%	
Federalist	Nathan Smith	863	8.31%	
Federalist	Timothy Pitkin	525	5.06%	
Jacksonian	David Plant	318	3.06%	
Other	Others	190	1.83%	
Majority		5,805		
Turnout				
Toleration hold		Swing		
