= 1824 Connecticut gubernatorial election =

- April 8, 1824
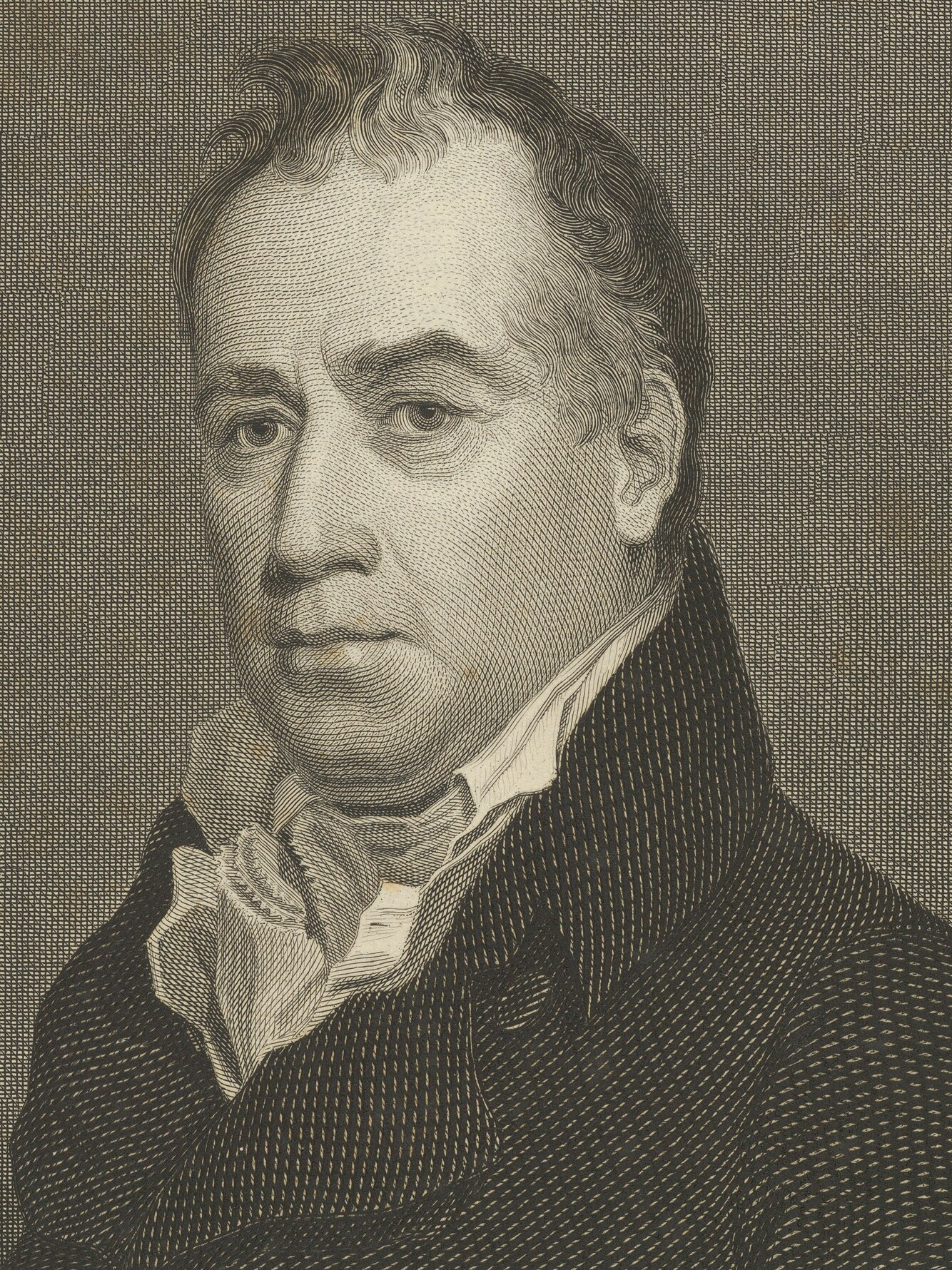

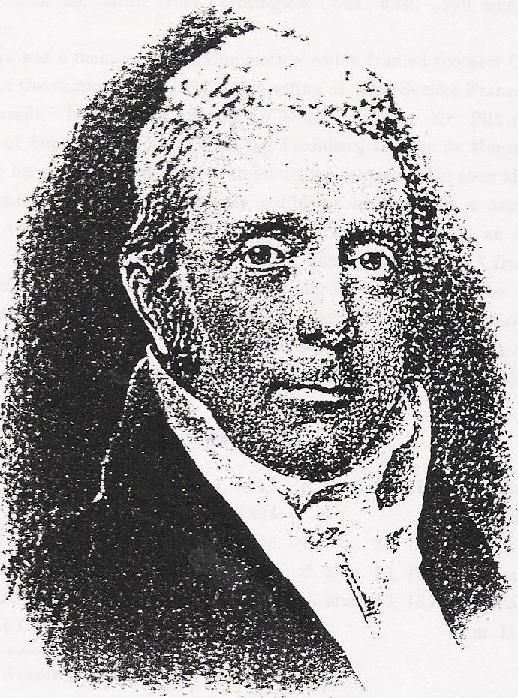
Nominee	Oliver Wolcott Jr.	Timothy Pitkin
Party	Toleration	Federalist
Popular vote	6,637	466
Percentage	88.81%	6.24%
- Wolcott: 50–60% 60–70% 70–80% 80–90% 90–100% Pitkin: 60–70% Plant: 50–60% No Data/Vote
Governor before election
Oliver Wolcott Jr.
Toleration
Elected Governor
Oliver Wolcott Jr.
Toleration

The 1824 Connecticut gubernatorial election was held on April 8, 1824. Incumbent governor and Toleration Party candidate Oliver Wolcott Jr. defeated former congressman and Federalist Party candidate Timothy Pitkin, winning with 88.81% of the vote.

== General election ==
=== Candidates ===
Major candidates

- Oliver Wolcott Jr., Toleration
- Timothy Pitkin, Federalist

Minor candidates

- David Plant, Jacksonian

=== Results ===
1824 Connecticut gubernatorial election
Party	Candidate	Votes	%	±%
Toleration	Oliver Wolcott Jr. (incumbent)	6,637	88.81%	
Federalist	Timothy Pitkin	466	6.24%	
Other	Others	247	3.31%	
Jacksonian	David Plant	123	1.65%	
Majority		6,171		
Turnout				
Toleration hold		Swing		
