= 1820 Connecticut gubernatorial election =

- April 13, 1820
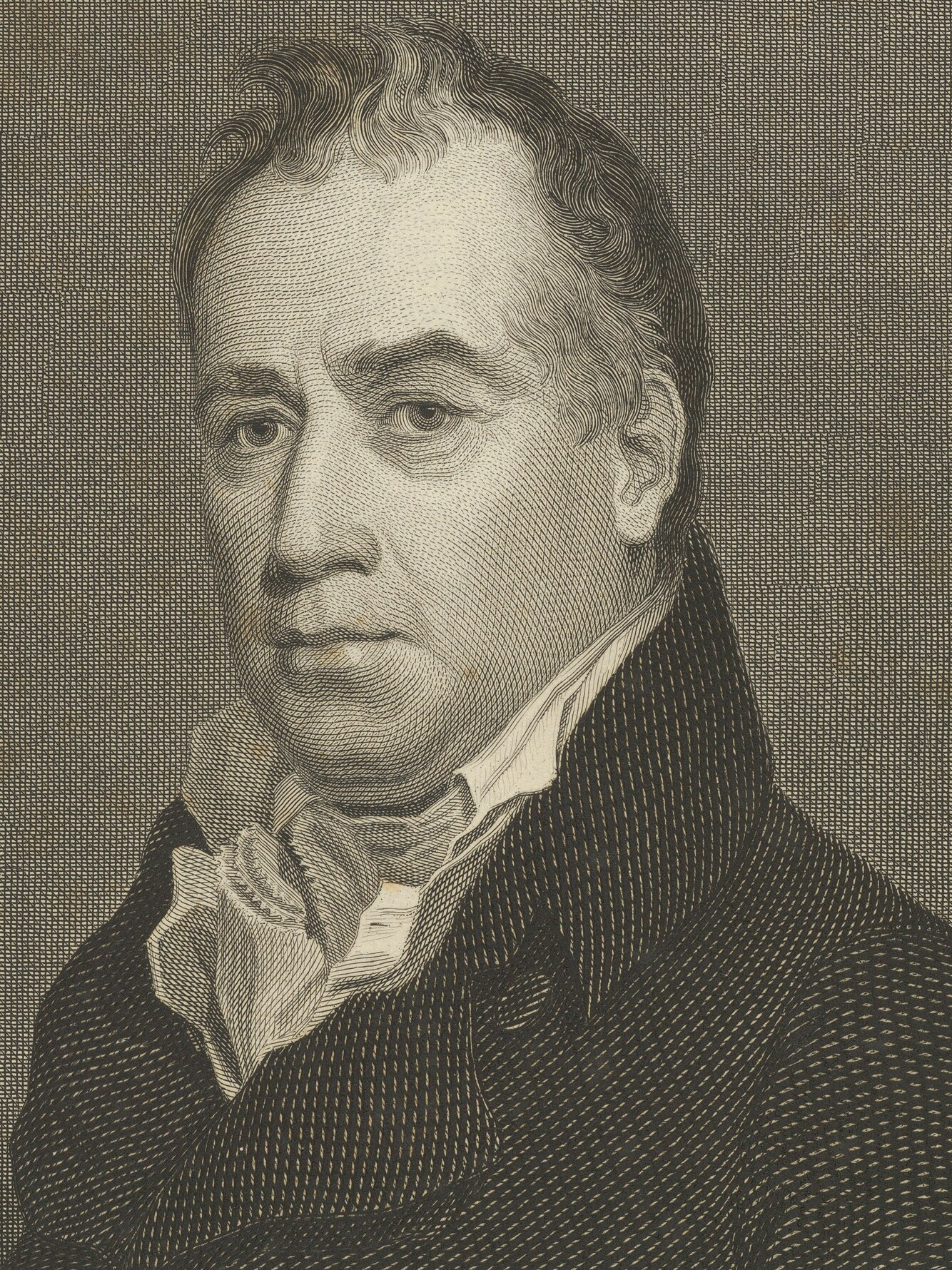

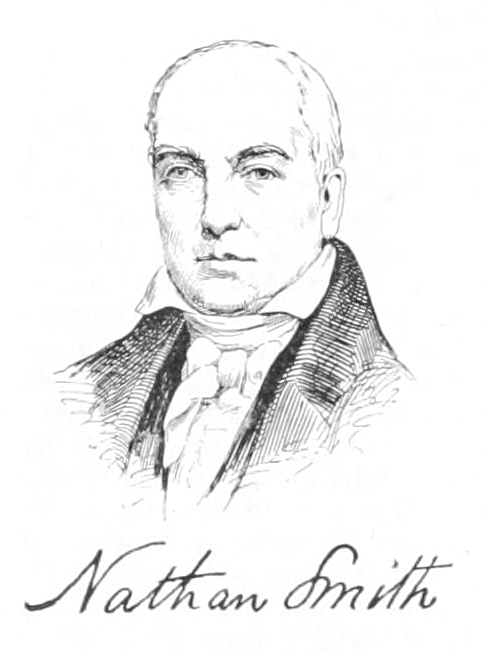

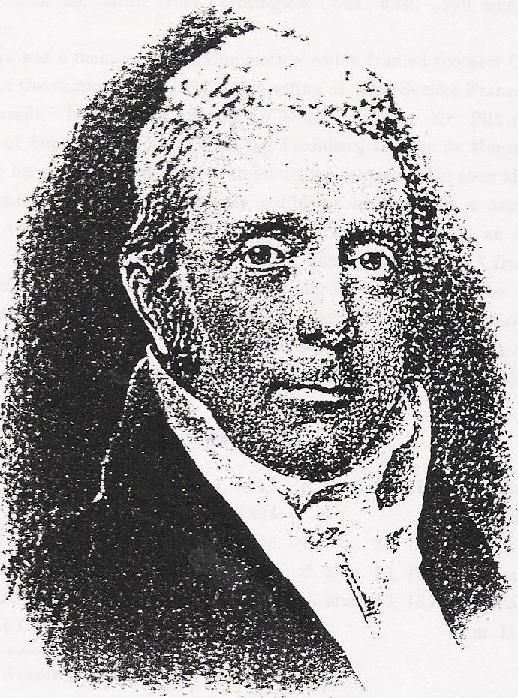
Nominee	Oliver Wolcott Jr.	Nathan Smith	Timothy Pitkin
Party	Toleration	Federalist	Federalist
Popular vote	15,738	2,659	1,140
Percentage	76.14%	12.86%	5.52%
- Wolcott: 40–50% 50–60% 60–70% 70–80% 80–90% 90–100% Smith: 40–50% 60–70% Pitkin: 50–60% 60–70% 70–80% No Data/Vote
Governor before election
Oliver Wolcott Jr.
Toleration
Elected Governor
Oliver Wolcott Jr.
Toleration

The 1820 Connecticut gubernatorial election was held on April 13, 1820. Incumbent governor and Toleration Party candidate Oliver Wolcott Jr. was re-elected, defeating Federalist Party candidates former delegate Nathan Smith and former congressman and state legislator Timothy Pitkin with 76.14% of the vote.

== General election ==
=== Candidates ===
Major candidates

- Oliver Wolcott Jr., Toleration
- Nathan Smith, Federalist
- Timothy Pitkin, Federalist

=== Results ===
1820 Connecticut gubernatorial election
Party	Candidate	Votes	%	±%
Toleration	Oliver Wolcott Jr. (incumbent)	22,539	89.2%	+2.4%
Federalist	Timothy Pitkin	1,200	4.7%	+0.1%
Federalist	John C. Smith	1,084	4.3%	+0.1%
Other	Others	440	1.7%	−2.6%
Majority		25,263		
Toleration hold		Swing		

County results
County	Oliver Wolcott Jr. Democratic-Republican		Timothy Pitkin Federalist		John Cotton Smith Federalist		Others		Total Votes
County	#	%	#	%	#	%	#	%	Total Votes
Fairfield	2,603	90.8%	3	0.1%	259	9.0%	3	0.1%	2,868
Hartford	4,064	86.4%	598	12.7%	37	0.8%	3	0.1%	4,702
Litchfield	3,311	80.3%	507	12.2%	282	6.5%	24	0.6%	4,124
Middlesex	2,103	96.6%	7	0.3%	39	1.8%	28	1.3%	2,177
New Haven	3,342	87.1%	27	0.7%	302	7.9%	166	4.3%	3,837
New London	2,935	99.4%	0	0.0%	7	0.2%	12	0.4%	2,954
Tolland	1,399	91.0%	53	3.4%	37	2.4%	48	3.1%	1,537
Windham	2,782	90.8%	5	0.2%	121	3.9%	157	5.1%	3,065
Totals	22,539	89.2%	1,200	4.7%	1,084	4.3%	440	1.7%	25,264
