= The New Haven Journal-Courier =

- Founded: 1767
- Ceased publication: 1987
- City: New Haven, Connecticut

The New Haven Journal-Courier, originally published as The Connecticut Journal, and New-Haven Post-Boy, later published as The Connecticut Journal, the Connecticut Herald, the Morning Journal and Courier, The Journal-Courier, and several other names, was a newspaper published in New Haven, Connecticut from 1767 to 1835 by Thomas and Samuel Green as well as others. The publishers also printed pamphlets including sermons and the "criminal confession" written by David Daggett about Joseph Mountain, an African American man executed in New Haven before a crowd of thousands of spectators. It was sold amongst the crowd and was a popular and influential treatise.

Thomas Green published several of Connecticut's earliest newspapers.

In 1875, prominent Republican businessman John Bennett Carrington, Sr. acquired the paper. As the paper's editor, Carrington sought to create a "family paper" that was "conservative in tone", but not "unduly partisan". By the 1880s, the paper was considered to be aligned with the Republican Party. During this time, the paper was publishing under the Journal and Courier title for its daily edition, and the Connecticut Herald and Journal title for its weekly edition.

In 1987 the paper was absorbed by the New Haven Register.

== Names and editions ==
- The Connecticut Journal, and New-Haven Post-Boy (October 23, 1767 – April 19, 1775)
- Connecticut Journal (April 26, 1775 – May 3, 1775)
- The Connecticut Journal, and New-Haven Post-Boy (May 10, 1775 – September 6, 1775)
- The Connecticut Journal (September 13, 1775 – January 3, 1799)
- Connecticut Journal and Weekly Advertiser (January 10, 1799 – March 28, 1799)
- The Connecticut Journal (April 4, 1799 – December 29, 1808)
- Connecticut Journal and Advertiser (January 5, 1809 – 1809)
- The Connecticut Journal (1809 – ?)
- Connecticut Herald (1821 – 1846)
- New-Haven Advertiser (1829 – 1832)
- New-Haven Daily Herald (1841 – 1848)
- Connecticut Herald and Weekly Courier (1846 – 1848)
- Morning Journal and Courier (1848 – 1894)
- Connecticut Herald and Weekly Journal (1861 – ?)
- The Daily Morning Journal and Courier (1894 – 1907)
- The Morning Journal-Courier (1907 – 1913)
- New Haven Journal-Courier (1913 – 1932)
- New Haven Journal-Courier and New Haven Times (1932 – 1959)
- New Haven Journal-Courier (1959 – 1973)
- The Journal-Courier (1973 – 1987)

== See also ==
- List of newspapers in Connecticut
