= Aenea =

Aenea may refer to:

- Aenea (city), a city of ancient Greece

== Biology ==
- Lamprima aenea, a species of beetle in the family Lucanidae
- Nebria aenea aenea, a subspecies of ground beetle in the subfamily Nebriinae

== Other uses ==
- Aenea, a character in the Hyperion Cantos by Dan Simmons

== See also ==
- Anaea (disambiguation)
- Aeneas (disambiguation)
