= Aeneas (disambiguation) =

Aeneas was a Trojan hero in Virgil's Aeneid and Homer's Iliad.

Aeneas may also refer to:

== Biblical or mythological characters ==
- Aeneas (biblical figure), a paralyzed man cured by Saint Peter in the Acts of the Apostles
- Aeneas Silvius, mythological king of Alba Longa

== People ==
- Aeneas Tacticus (fl. 4th century BC), Greek military writer
- Aeneas of Gaza (died c. 518), philosopher
- Aeneas of Paris (died 870), Bishop of Paris
- Aeneas de Caprara (1631–1701), Austrian field marshal
- Aeneas Munson (1734–1826), American physician and Yale Medical School professor
- Aeneas Shaw (c. 1740–1814), soldier and politician of Upper Canada
- Aeneas Chisholm (vicar apostolic) (1759–1818), Scottish Roman Catholic bishop
- Aeneas Coffey (1780–1852), inventor of the Coffey still
- Aeneas Chisholm (bishop of Aberdeen) (1836–1918), Scottish Roman Catholic bishop
- Aeneas Mackay Jr. (1839–1909), Prime Minister of the Netherlands
- Aeneas Mackintosh (1879–1916), Antarctic explorer and British merchant navy officer
- Aeneas Gallant (1882–1971), Canadian farmer, merchant and politician
- Aeneas MacKenzie (1889–1962), Hollywood screenwriter
- Æneas John McIntyre (1821–1889), British politician
- Aeneas Chigwedere (1939–2021), Zimbabwean politician
- Aeneas Williams (born 1968), American National Football League player
- Aeneas Peebles (born 2001), American football player

== Places ==
- Aeneas, Washington, an unincorporated area in the American state of Washington
- Aeneas, an impact crater of Saturn's moon Dione

== Ships ==
- HMS Aeneas, a Royal Navy submarine
- Aeneas (troopship), a ship owned by the British government and wrecked in 1805

== Other uses ==
- Aeneas Internet and Telephone, a telecommunications provider serving the state of Tennessee
- Aeneas, a GNU software package substituted by GNU Archimedes
- Corydoras aeneus, a species of catfish popular in aquariums
- Parides aeneas, a species of butterfly in the family Papilionidae

== See also ==
- 1172 Äneas, a Jupiter trojan asteroid
- Aenea (disambiguation)
- Pope Pius II (1405–1464), born Enea Silvio Piccolomini (in Latin Aeneas Sylvius)
- Enéas Carneiro (1938–2007), Brazilian politician
- Eneas Emvula (born 1974), Namibian politician
