= 1819 Connecticut gubernatorial election =

American incumbent governor reelection

- April 8, 1819
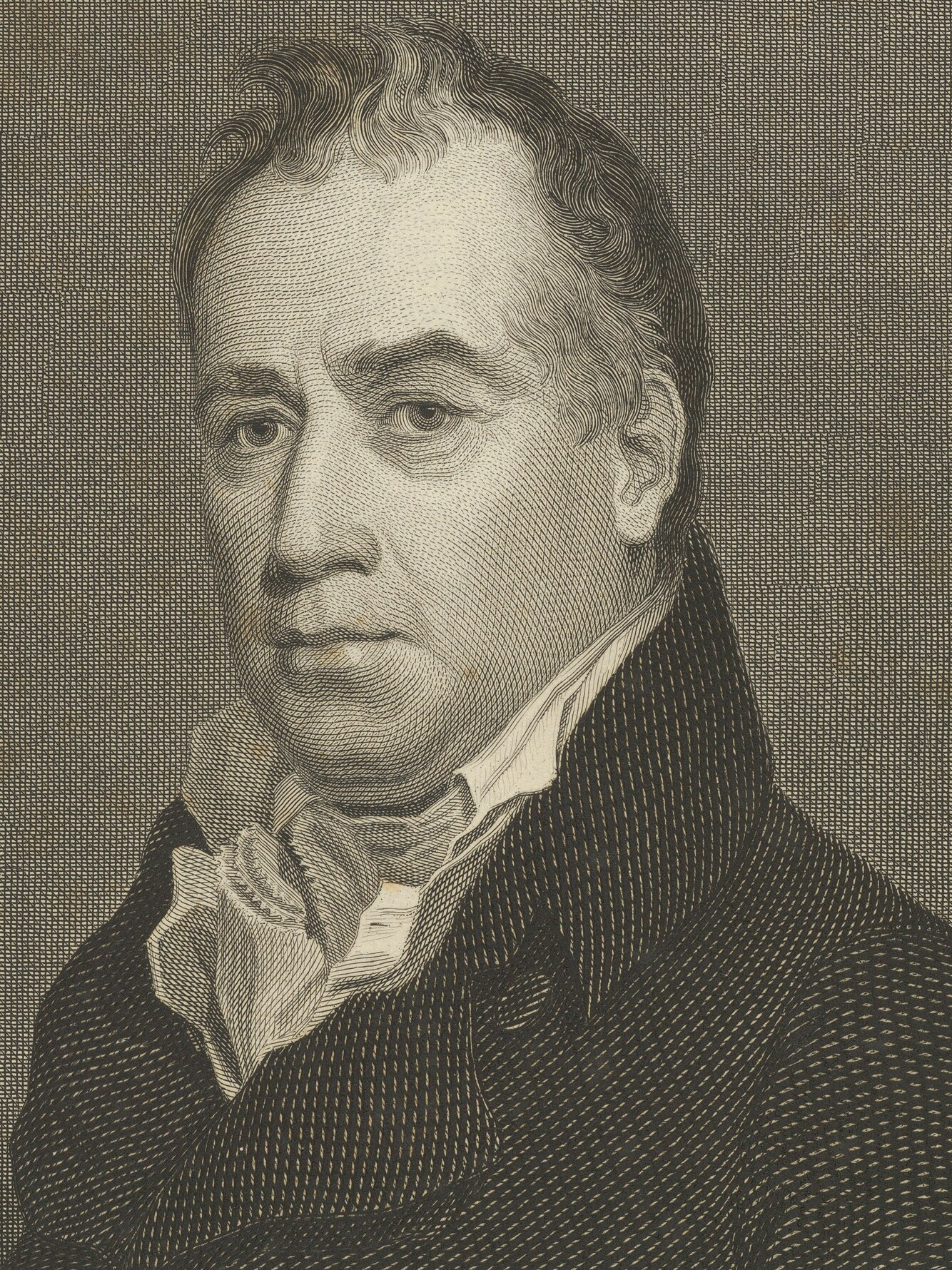
Nominee	Oliver Wolcott Jr.
Party	Toleration
Popular vote	22,539
Percentage	86.85%
- Wolcott: 50–60% 60–70% 70–80% 80–90% 90–100% Pitkin: 60–70% Smith: 40–50%
Governor before election
Oliver Wolcott Jr.
Toleration
Elected Governor
Oliver Wolcott Jr.
Toleration

The 1819 Connecticut gubernatorial election was held on April 8, 1819. Incumbent governor and Toleration Party candidate Oliver Wolcott Jr. was re-elected, winning with 86.85% of the vote.

== General election ==
=== Candidates ===
Major candidates

- Oliver Wolcott Jr., Toleration

Minor candidates

- Timothy Pitkin, Federalist
- John Cotton Smith Smith, Federalist

=== Results ===
1819 Connecticut gubernatorial election
Party	Candidate	Votes	%	±%
Toleration	Oliver Wolcott Jr. (incumbent)	22,539	86.85%	
Federalist	Timothy Pitkin	1,200	4.62%	
Other	Others	1,130	4.35%	
Federalist	John Cotton Smith	1,084	4.18%	
Majority		21,339		
Turnout				
Toleration hold		Swing		

County results
County	Oliver Wolcott Jr. Democratic-Republican		Timothy Pitkin Federalist		John Cotton Smith Federalist		Others		Total Votes
County	#	%	#	%	#	%	#	%	Total Votes
Fairfield	2,603	88.1%	3	0.1%	259	8.8%	90	3.0%	2,955
Hartford	4,064	83.1%	598	12.2%	37	0.8%	192	3.9%	4,891
Litchfield	3,311	76.6%	507	11.7%	282	6.5%	224	5.2%	4,324
Middlesex	2,103	94.3%	7	0.3%	39	1.7%	82	3.7%	2,231
New Haven	3,342	84.7%	27	0.7%	302	7.7%	275	7.0%	3,946
New London	2,935	98.6%	0	0.0%	7	0.2%	36	1.2%	2,978
Tolland	1,399	84.4%	53	3.2%	37	2.2%	168	10.1%	1,657
Windham	2,782	93.6%	5	0.2%	121	4.0%	63	2.1%	2,971
Totals	22,539	86.8%	1,200	4.6%	1,084	4.2%	1,130	4.4%	25,953
