= 1816 Connecticut gubernatorial election =

- April 11, 1816
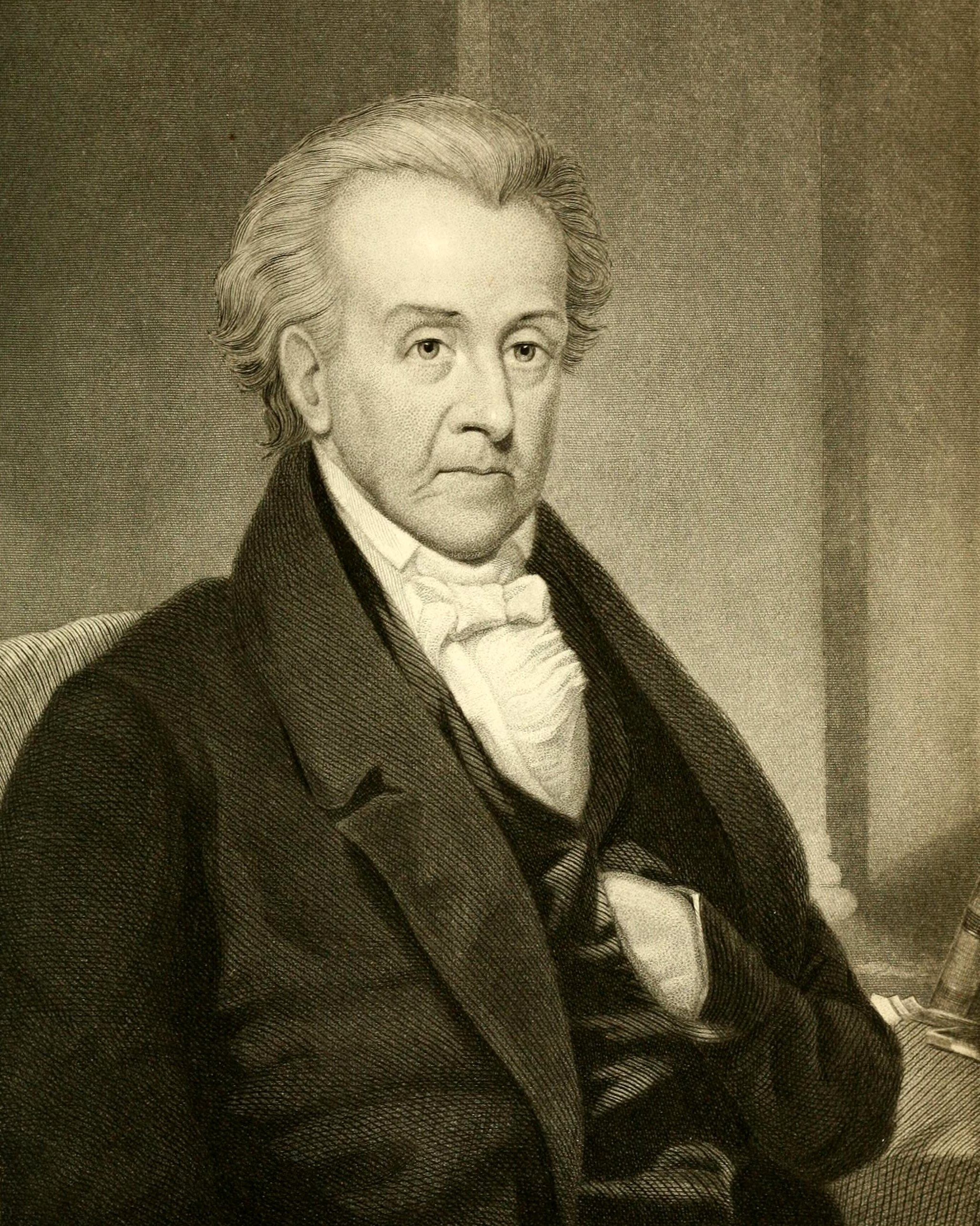

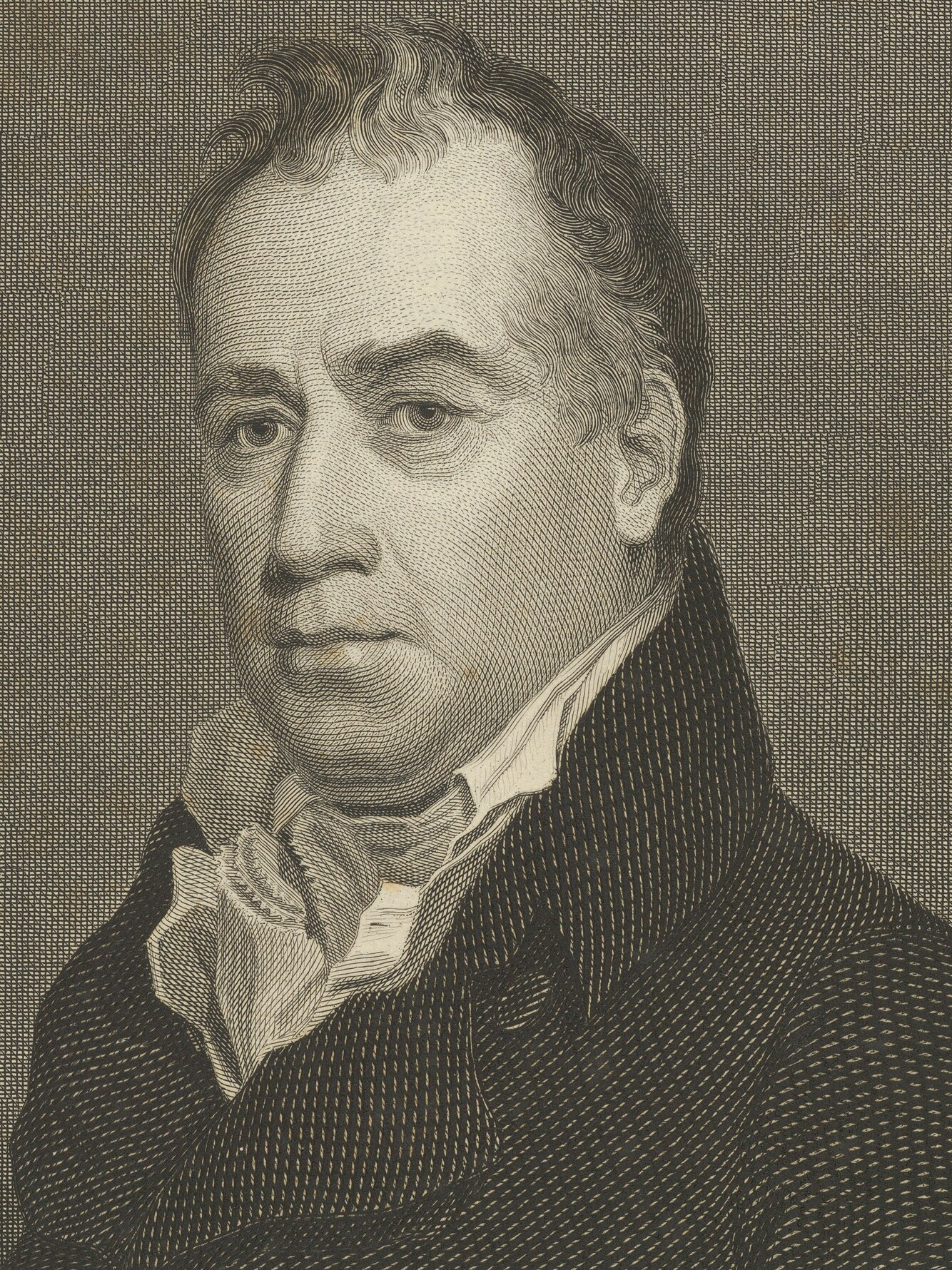
| Nominee | John Cotton Smith | Oliver Wolcott Jr. |
| Party | Federalist | Toleration |
| Popular vote | 11,414 | 10,281 |
| Percentage | 52.13% | 46.96% |
- Smith: 50–60% 60–70% 70–80% 80–90% 90–100% Wolcott: 50–60% 60–70% 70–80% 80–90% Tie: 50%
Governor before election
John Cotton Smith
Federalist
Elected Governor
John Cotton Smith
Federalist

The 1816 Connecticut gubernatorial election was held on April 11, 1816, in order to elect the Governor of Connecticut. Incumbent Federalist Governor of Connecticut John Cotton Smith won re-election against Toleration Party nominee and former United States Secretary of the Treasury Oliver Wolcott Jr.

== General election ==
On election day, April 11, 1816, Federalist nominee John Cotton Smith won re-election by a margin of 1,133 votes against his opponent Toleration Party nominee Oliver Wolcott Jr., thereby retaining Federalist control over the office of Governor. Smith was sworn in for his fourth term on May 9, 1816.

=== Results ===
Connecticut gubernatorial election, 1816
| Party | Candidate | Votes | % |
|---|---|---|---|
| Federalist | John Cotton Smith (incumbent) | 11,414 | 52.13 |
| Toleration | Oliver Wolcott Jr. | 10,281 | 46.96 |
| Scattering | | 200 | 0.91 |
| Total votes | | 21,895 | 100.00 |
| Federalist hold | | | |
