= 1817 Connecticut gubernatorial election =

- April 10, 1817
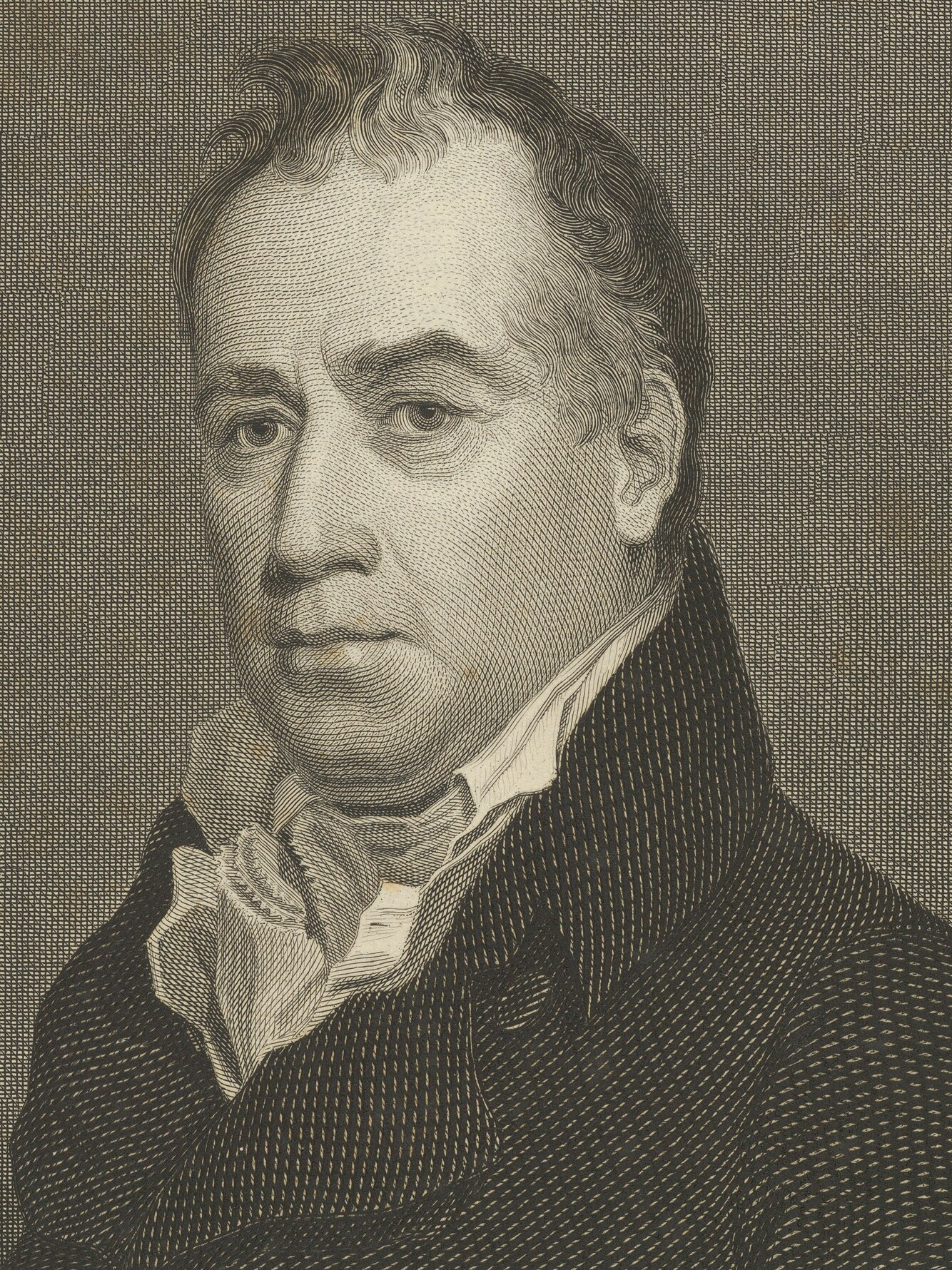

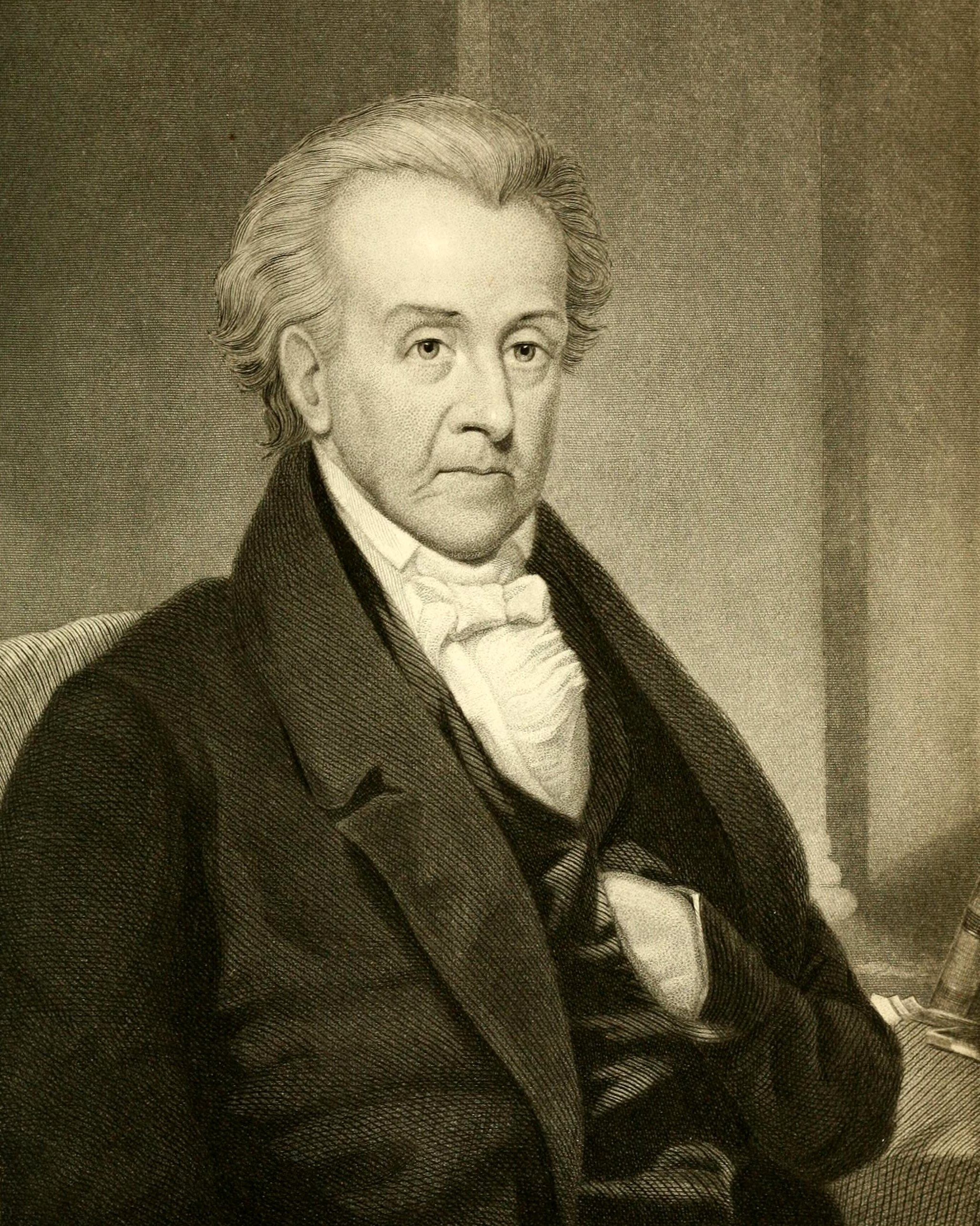
Nominee	Oliver Wolcott Jr.	John Cotton Smith
Party	Toleration	Federalist
Popular vote	14,593	13,719
Percentage	51.16%	48.10%
- County results Wolcott: 50–60% 60–70% Smith: 50–60%
Governor before election
John Cotton Smith
Federalist
Elected Governor
Oliver Wolcott Jr.
Toleration

The 1817 Connecticut gubernatorial election was held on April 10, 1817, in order to elect the Governor of Connecticut. Incumbent Federalist Governor of Connecticut John Cotton Smith lost re-election against Toleration Party nominee and former United States Secretary of the Treasury Oliver Wolcott Jr.

== General election ==
On election day, April 10, 1817, Federalist nominee John Cotton Smith lost re-election by a margin of 874 votes against his opponent Toleration Party nominee Oliver Wolcott Jr., thereby losing Federalist control over the office of Governor to the Democratic-Republicans. Wolcott was sworn in as the 24th Governor of Connecticut on May 8, 1817.

=== Results ===
Connecticut gubernatorial election, 1817
Party	Candidate	Votes	%
Toleration	Oliver Wolcott Jr.	14,593	51.16
Federalist	John Cotton Smith (incumbent)	13,719	48.10
Scattering		211	0.74
Total votes		28,523	100.00
Toleration gain from Federalist			
