= 1822 Connecticut gubernatorial election =

- April 11, 1822
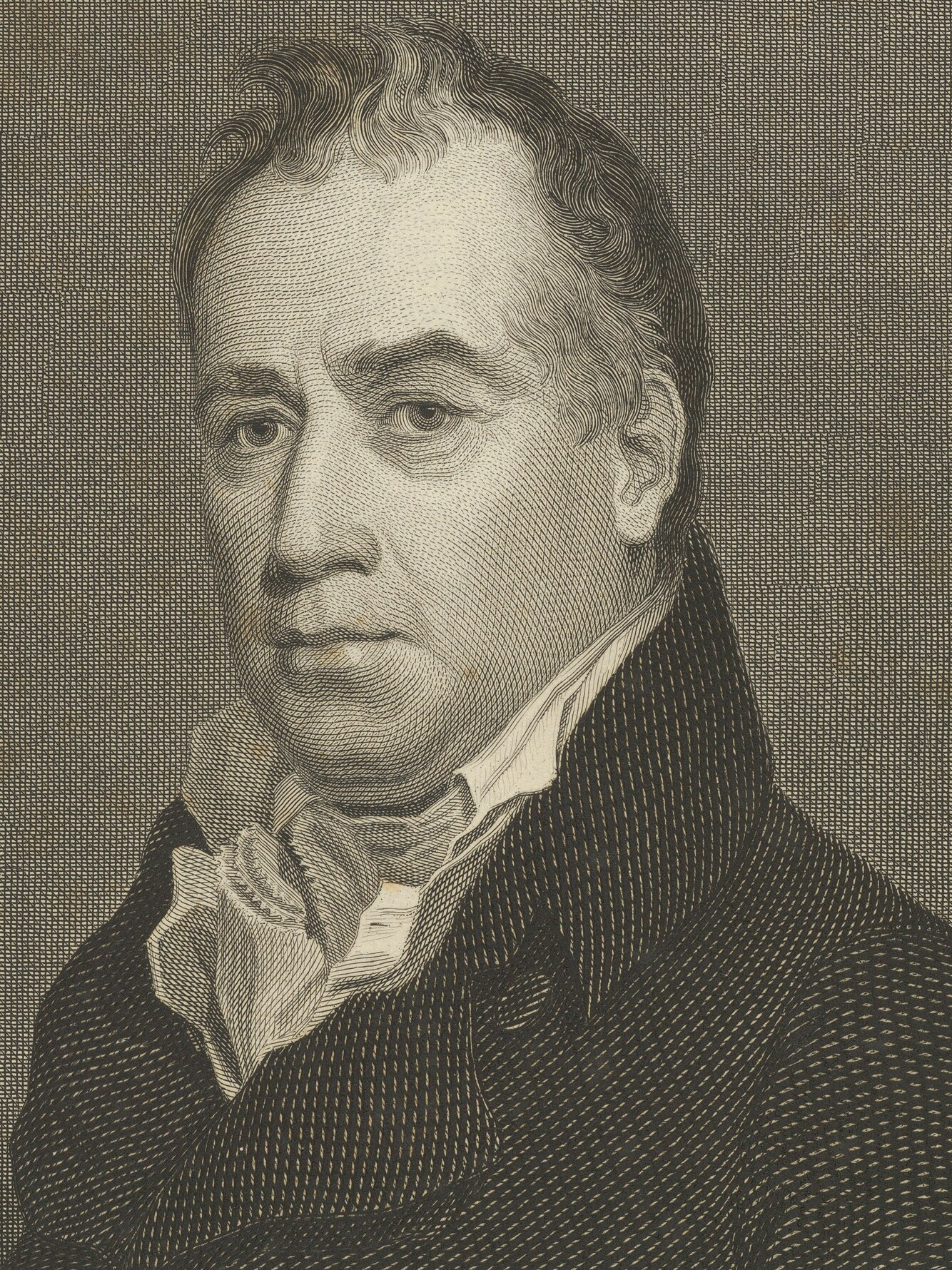

Nominee	Oliver Wolcott Jr.	Zephaniah Swift
Party	Toleration	Federalist
Popular vote	8,568	570
Percentage	86.59%	5.76%
- Wolcott: 50–60% 60–70% 70–80% 80–90% 90–100% French: 50–60% Ingersoll: 60–70% Pitkin: 50–60% Pratt: 70–80% Tie: 40–50% No Vote/Data
Governor before election
Oliver Wolcott Jr.
Toleration
Elected Governor
Oliver Wolcott Jr.
Toleration

The 1822 Connecticut gubernatorial election was held on April 11, 1822. Incumbent governor and Toleration Party candidate Oliver Wolcott Jr. defeated former congressman and Federalist Party candidate Zephaniah Swift, winning with 86.59% of the vote.

== General election ==
=== Candidates ===
Major candidates

- Oliver Wolcott Jr., Toleration
- Zephaniah Swift, Federalist

Minor candidates

- Timothy Pitkin, Federalist

=== Results ===
1822 Connecticut gubernatorial election
Party	Candidate	Votes	%	±%
Toleration	Oliver Wolcott Jr. (incumbent)	8,568	86.59%	
Federalist	Zephaniah Swift	570	5.76%	
Other	Others	393	3.97%	
Federalist	Timothy Pitkin	364	3.68%	
Majority		7,998		
Turnout				
Toleration hold		Swing		
