= Dios Hieron =

Dios Hieron (Ancient Greek: Διὸς Ἱερόν) may refer to:

- Dios Hieron (Ionia)
- Dios Hieron (Lydia)
