= 1818 Connecticut gubernatorial election =

- April 9, 1818
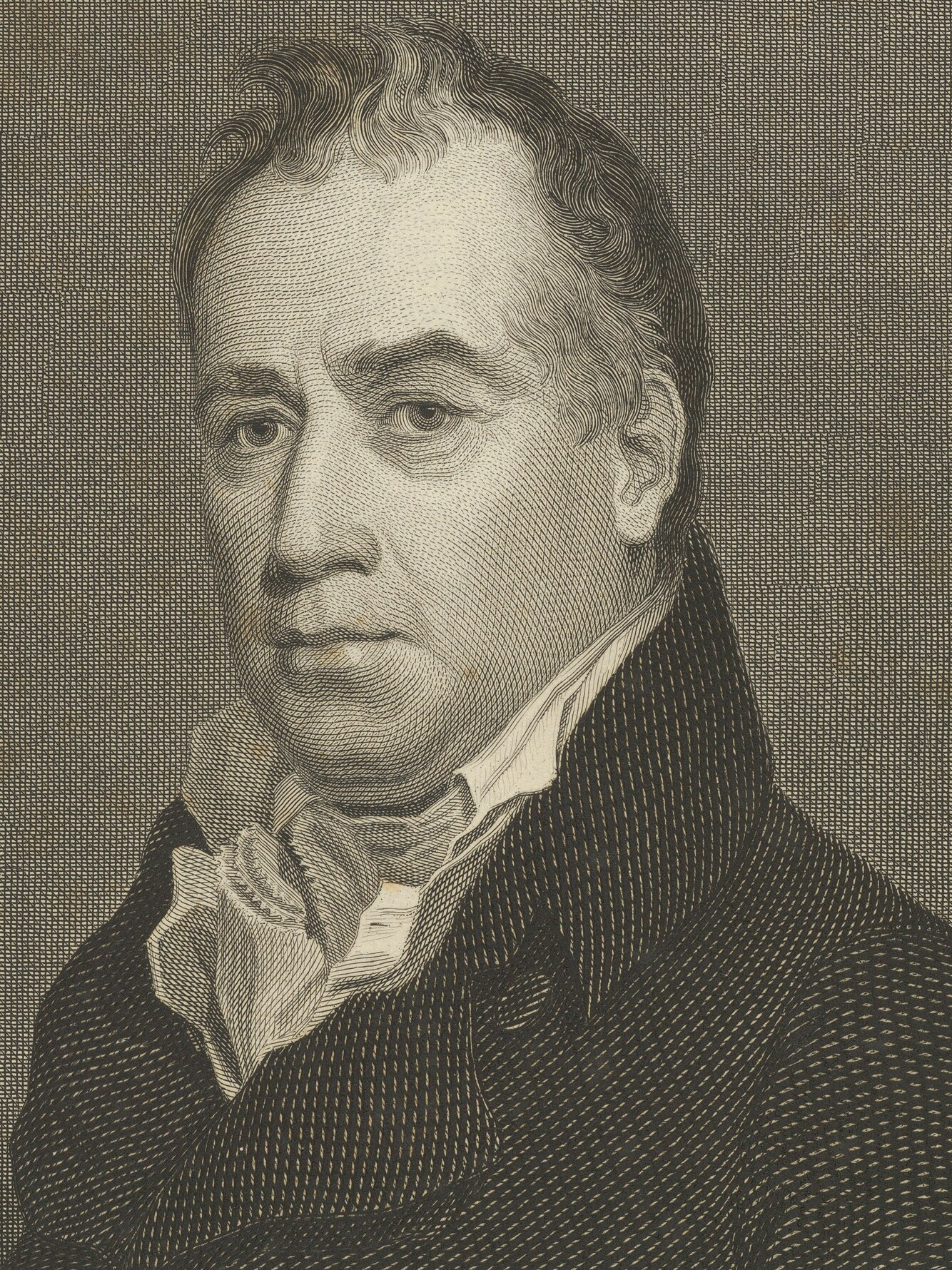

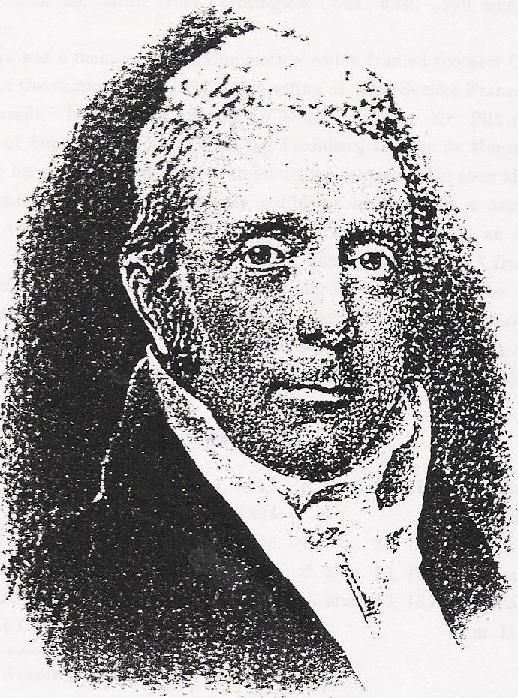
Nominee	Oliver Wolcott Jr.	Timothy Pitkin
Party	Toleration	Federalist
Popular vote	15,432	2,446
Percentage	86.32%	13.68%
- County results Wolcott: 60–70% 80–90% >90% No data
Governor before election
Oliver Wolcott Jr.
Toleration
Elected Governor
Oliver Wolcott Jr.
Toleration

The 1818 Connecticut gubernatorial election was held on April 9, 1818. Incumbent governor and Toleration Party candidate Oliver Wolcott Jr. was re-elected, defeating congressman and Federalist Party candidate Timothy Pitkin with 86.32% of the vote.

== General election ==
=== Candidates ===
Major candidates

- Oliver Wolcott Jr., Toleration
- Timothy Pitkin, Federalist

=== Results ===
1818 Connecticut gubernatorial election
Party	Candidate	Votes	%	±%
Toleration	Oliver Wolcott Jr. (incumbent)	15,432	86.32%	
Federalist	Timothy Pitkin	2,446	13.68%	
Majority		12,986		
Turnout				
Toleration hold		Swing		
