= 1823 Connecticut gubernatorial election =

- April 10, 1823
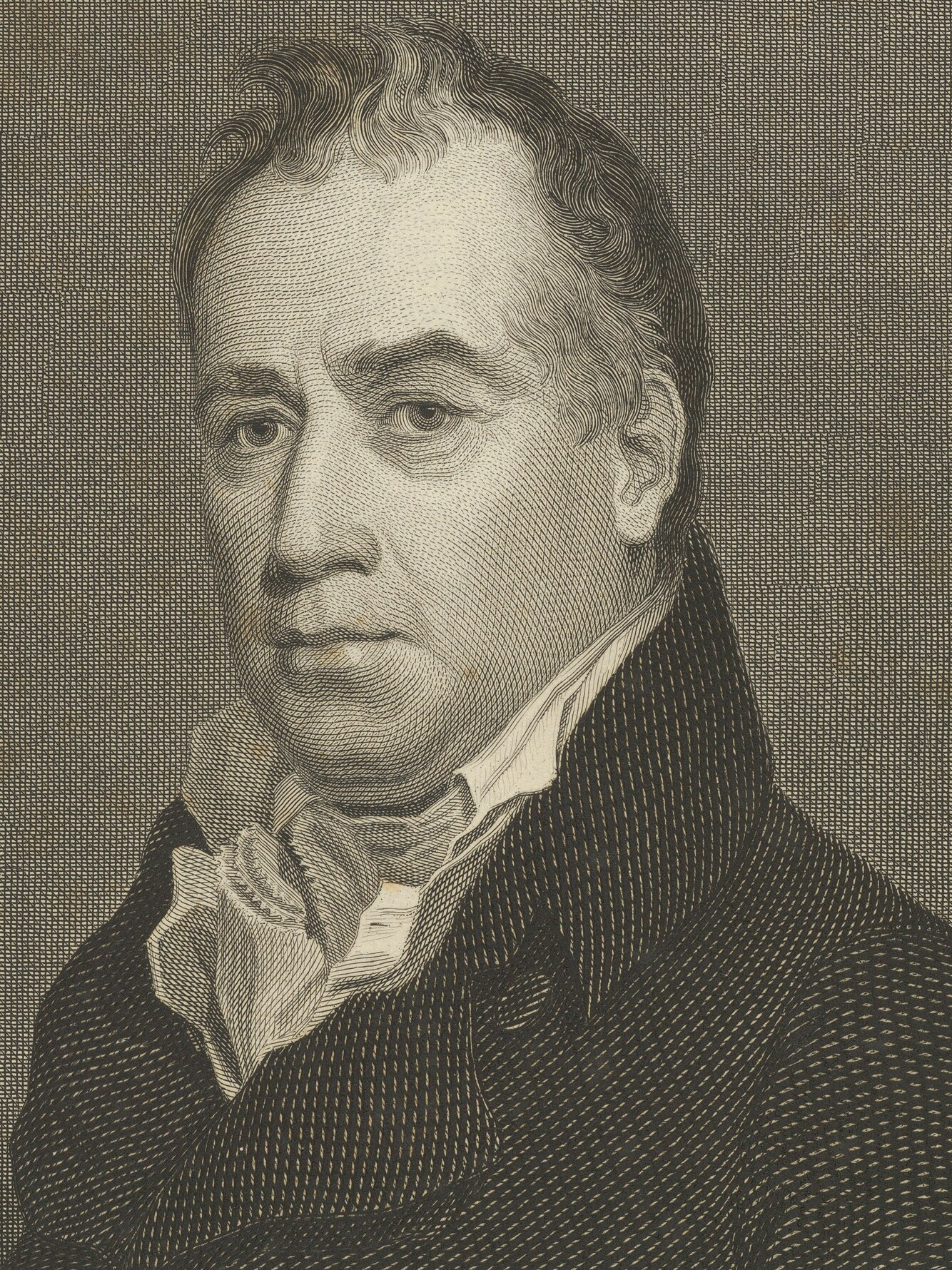
Nominee	Oliver Wolcott Jr.
Party	Toleration
Popular vote	9,090
Percentage	88.96%
- Wolcott: 50–60% 60–70% 70–80% 80–90% 90–100% Swift: 50–60% Pitkin: 30–40% 50–60% No Vote/Data
Governor before election
Oliver Wolcott Jr.
Toleration
Elected Governor
Oliver Wolcott Jr.
Toleration

The 1823 Connecticut gubernatorial election was held on April 10, 1823. Incumbent governor and Toleration Party candidate Oliver Wolcott Jr. won re-election with 88.96% of the vote.

== General election ==
=== Candidates ===
Major candidates

- Oliver Wolcott Jr., Toleration

Minor candidates

- Zephaniah Swift, Federalist
- Timothy Pitkin, Federalist

=== Results ===
1823 Connecticut gubernatorial election
Party	Candidate	Votes	%	±%
Toleration	Oliver Wolcott Jr. (incumbent)	9,090	88.96%	
Other	Others	500	4.89%	
Federalist	Zephaniah Swift	391	3.83%	
Federalist	Timothy Pitkin	237	2.32%	
Majority		8,590		
Turnout				
Toleration hold		Swing		
