= Oliver Ellsworth Daggett =

American minister (1810–1880)

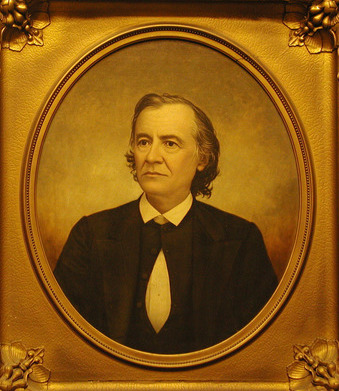
- Born: January 14, 1810; New Haven
- Died: August 31, 1880; Hartford
- Education: Yale Divinity School, Yale Law School, Yale University
- Occupation: Parson
- Father: David Daggett

Oliver Ellsworth Daggett (January 14, 1810 – September 1, 1880) was an American minister and lawyer.

Daggett was born in New Haven, Connecticut, on January 14, 1810, the son of the Hon. David Daggett, Chief Justice of the Supreme Court of Connecticut and Kent Professor of Law at Yale College, and of Wealthy Ann, daughter of Dr. Aeneas Munson, first Professor of Materia Medica at the Yale Medical School.

Daggett graduated from Yale in 1828. He spent three years in the Yale Law School and was admitted to the bar in March 1831. Subsequently, as a convert in the great religious revival of 1831, he determined to enter the Christian ministry, and spent nearly two years in the Yale Divinity School. He was ordained pastor of the South Church in Hartford, Connecticut, on April 12, 1837, and resigned that charge on June 23, 1843. He was installed over the First Congregational Church in Canandaigua, New York, on January 30, 1845, and was dismissed on October 16, 1867, to accept the pastorate of the church in Yale College, with the title of professor of divinity. He resigned this charge after three years of service, and was installed over the Second Congregational Church in New London on February 21, 1871. Daggett retired from the arduous labors of a settled ministry with his dismissal from this charge on September 5, 1877, and removed his residence to Hartford, Connecticut, where he died, without previous warning, of rupture of the heart at the age of 70.

He received the degree of Doctor of Divinity from Hamilton College in 1853. He left no published memorials of his fine powers as a writer and his discriminating literary taste, except a few sermons, and articles in various periodicals. Since his death a small volume of his poems has been printed. From 1872 he was a member of the Corporation of Yale College.

Daggett married Elizabeth, daughter of William Watson, of Hartford, on July 15, 1840. She survived him with two daughters and a son, the son being a graduate of the Sheffield Scientific School in 1864.

His papers are held at Yale University.

== Publications ==
Daggett's publications include;

- “Sermon on the death of Abraham Lincoln, April 15, 1865”
- “Poems” (1880)
- “The cavil of Judas, or, False pretences: a sermon”
