= Anaea =

Anaea may refer to:

- Anaea (Asia), an ancient city and present Catholic see in Turkey
- Anaea (Greek: Ἀναία), an Amazon from whom the city of Anaea in Caria took its name.
- Anaea (butterfly), a genus in the Anaeini tribe of butterflies
- Annaea, city in ancient Ionia
- Annaea gens, Ancient Roman family
