= Zephaniah Swift =

American judge

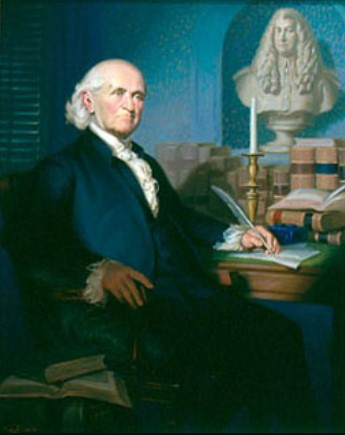

Member of the U.S. House of Representatives from Connecticut's at-large district
- In office March 4, 1793 – March 3, 1797
- Preceded by: Joshua Coit
- Succeeded by: Uriah Tracy

Member of the Connecticut House of Representatives
- In office 1787–1793

Personal details
- Born: February 27, 1759 Wareham, Province of Massachusetts Bay, British America
- Died: September 27, 1823 (aged 64) Warren, Ohio, U.S.
- Party: Pro-Administration Party and Federalist
- Spouse(s): Jerusha Watrous Swift and Lucretia Webb Swift
- Education: Yale College
- Occupation: Lawyer, Author, Politician, Judge

Zephaniah Swift (February 27, 1759 – September 27, 1823) was an eighteenth-century American writer, judge, lawyer, chief justice, congressman, law professor, diplomat and politician from Windham, Connecticut. He served as a U.S. representative from Connecticut and State Supreme Court judge. He wrote the first legal treatise published in America.

He was also appointed secretary to Founding Father Oliver Ellsworth by President John Adams at the Treaty of Mortefontaine, in negotiations with King Joseph Bonaparte.

== Early life and education ==
Swift was born in Wareham, Massachusetts, to Rowland Swift and Mary (Dexter) Swift. He moved with his parents to Lebanon, Connecticut. He completed preparatory studies and graduated from Yale College in 1778. He studied law, was admitted to the bar and began the practice of law in Windham, Connecticut.

== Career ==
He served in the Connecticut General Assembly from 1787 to 1793, serving as speaker in 1792, and clerk of the lower house for four sessions. After two unsuccessful campaigns for the U.S. House in 1792, Swift was elected as a Pro-Administration candidate to the Third Congress in a special election for two vacant at-large seats, with the other seat won by Joshua Coit, and as a Federalist candidate to the Fourth Congress. He served in Congress from March 4, 1793, to March 3, 1797. Upon the expiration of his second Congressional term he returned to Connecticut and was elected Speaker of the General Assembly.

In 1795, Swift wrote "A System of the Law of the State of Connecticut", the first legal treatise published in America. In 1796, having served on a Congressional committee, he compiled and edited the first official version of "The Laws of the United States of America." The three volume collection was published by authority of Congress and contained an extensive index. For over a hundred years, Swift's work on this publication was wrongly credited to the publisher, Richard Folwell, until historian Clarence E. Carter established that Zephania Swift deserved credit for the project.

After serving in Congress, Swift also resumed the practice of law in Windham and engaged in literary pursuits. He wrote "A Digest of the Laws of the State of Connecticut" which was published in 1820. It is said that a country law office was well furnished "if it had a three legged stool and Swift's Digest". He also wrote the first American treatise on the law of evidence. He was variously referred to as an "American Blackstone."

Swift's publications were highly regarded around the United States and are still cited today. Although Swift's "System of Laws" focused on Connecticut law, it addressed American law generally, and was intended for a national audience.

Swift also ran a successful law school for many years out of his office, which became known as Swift's Law School. Among his students were Charles J. McCurdy who became a Connecticut justice and Rufus P. Spalding who was a member of the Supreme Court of Ohio. He was also a member of the Connecticut council of assistants in 1799 and 1801.

Swift served as secretary of the French mission in 1800 to Oliver Ellsworth, having been appointed by President Adams, along with Chief-Justice Ellsworth, William Vans Murray and Patrick Henry. The purpose of the mission was to attempt to peacefully resolve the undeclared Quasi War with France which arose in connection with the XYZ Affair. The successful negotiations with Napoleon and Talleyrand resulted in the Convention of 1800, also known as the Treaty of Mortefontaine. Arguably, the ability to secure this treaty with Napoleon in 1800 and its resulting good will opened the door to the Louisiana Purchase in 1803. President Adams believed this treaty to be one of the most important accomplishments of his presidency. According to Adams, "I desire no other inscription over my gravestone than 'Here lies John Adams, who took upon himself the responsibility for peace with France in the year 1800.' "

He was a judge on the Connecticut Supreme Court (known then as the Supreme Court of Errors) beginning in 1801 and served as the chief justice from 1806 to 1819. Swift was appointed as a delegate to the Hartford Convention from 1814 to 1815, which among other things debated secession in opposition to the War of 1812. When the Connecticut Constitution was adopted in 1818, he lost his position in the Supreme Court and returned to the Legislature.

"Zephaniah Swift was a pioneer in development of an American common law distinct from England." During the colonial era, it was common to follow precedents from English courts. "In 1795, Swift wrote the first text on American law, called 'A System of Law,' which stated what in his opinion the common law of Connecticut was, based on what Connecticut judges were actually doing. It was a radical departure from English precedents, and was an appropriate departure too if the 'Revolution' was to have practical meaning."

At the time, legal publications were sold by subscription. Swift's prestigious subscriber list to "A System of Law" includes President Washington, Vice President Adams, the Cabinet and half of the U.S. Supreme Court, along with James Madison, John Monroe, Aaron Burr, and other founding fathers (Edmund Randolph – First Attorney General and presenter of the Virginia Plan at the Constitutional Convention; Robert Morris – "Financier of the Revolution"; Oliver Ellsworth – future Chief Justice and presenter of the Connecticut Plan; Charles Lee – Third Attorney General) and signers of the Declaration of Independence. Subscribers are listed from every state, including the original 13 colonies, Vermont, Kentucky and Tennessee, which became the 16th state when the second volume was published.

In the introduction of "A System of Law" he explained that every citizen ought to acquire knowledge of those laws that govern their daily conduct and "secure the invaluable blessings of life, liberty and property."

According to Swift, the best method to diffuse this knowledge was to "simplify" and "fyftematize" (systematize) the laws. In the introduction to his Digest of the Law of Evidence Swift wrote that "No object is more important in society, than a code of laws founded on principles of justice, and promulgated with such perspicuity, and precision, that they may be easily understood, and uniformly administered." He further explained that doing so "furnishes to the people more effective security for their liberty, than mere forms of government" and "checks their tendency to despotism, and restrains the baneful influence of party spirit."

Swift was an early proponent of judicial independence, which may have been the ultimate reason why he was not reappointed to the bench in 1818. He was outspoken in denouncing legislative interference with the courts, including the power to grant new trials and the setting aside of judgments. When the Legislature intervened to reverse a criminal conviction in Lung's Case, a case in which Justice Swift had presided, he did not hesitate to express his displeasure with the Legislature. In a pamphlet entitled "Vindication etc.", Justice Swift explained that the Legislature should "never encroach on the jurisdiction of the Judiciary." After expressing this opinion, he was not reappointed to the bench. Nevertheless, Swift's views regarding the importance of protecting judicial independence was validated with the adoption of the 1818 Constitution. Historians have recognized that Swift was a "moving force" in convening the convention of 1818 to draft Connecticut's first constitution.

Swift was an outspoken critic of slavery, which he described as a "practice which has long been a dishonor to human nature." He was an active member of the Connecticut Society for the Promotion of Freedom and Relief of Persons Unlawfully Holden in Bondage. An address he delivered in 1791 in Hartford to the Society is credited as one of the reasons that Connecticut adopted a statute in 1792 to encourage emancipation by relieving former owners from liability to support their freed slaves. A bill was subsequently passed by the Connecticut House of Representatives to abolish slavery, but it failed to receive assent of the upper house.

Swift supported softening criminal laws by making prisons more comfortable and by lessening the number of offenses punishable by the death penalty. In Swift's day it was not considered proper for a judge to give instructions on the law to a jury. He argued against this limitation, which is now a widely accepted and necessary judicial function.

In 1815 Swift received an honorary degree of Doctor of Laws from Yale College. Swift again served as a member of the State's House of Representatives, serving from 1820 to 1822.

Swift was an unsuccessful Federalist candidate for Governor of Connecticut in both the 1822 and 1823 elections.

== Personal life ==
Swift married Jerusha Watrous Swift (1763–1792) and they had one son together, Henry Swift. Swift later married Lucretia Webb Swift (1775–1843) on March 14, 1795. They had seven children together, two sons named George, Edward, Lucretia, Emily, Lucien, and Julia Swift. (Note: Allibone's Dictionary (1871), Appletons' Cyclopædia of American Biography (1889), and the Encyclopedia of Connecticut Biography (1917), all link Mary A. Swift, the author to judge Zephaniah Swift (1759–1823). William Palmer, a former professor and a Fellow of the Royal Australian Chemical Institute, reviewed published genealogies and biographical dictionaries, noting that the genealogies all stated that Mary Amelia was the daughter of the physician Zephaniah Swift (1786–1834). He recognized the possibility that writers after Allibone, relied on his work and might have been in error. The judge's will, dated August 24, 1823, shows his wife, Lucretia, and children — Henry, George, Edward, Lucretia, Emily, Lucian, and Julia — as beneficiaries. The writer Mary Amelia Swift first published in 1833.)

Julia married Dr. Winslow T. Huntington, grandfather of Alice Louise, who married the son of Mayor George W. Gardner, an early business partner of John D. Rockefeller and political associate of Senator Mark Hanna, Chairman of the Republicans.

Zephaniah Swift died on September 27, 1823, while visiting his children in Warren, Ohio. He is interred in Oakwood Cemetery in Warren.

== Published works ==
- "A System of the Law of the State of Connecticut" (1795)
- "A Digest of the Laws of the State of Connecticut" (1820)
- "A Digest of the Laws of Evidence in Civil and Criminal Cases" (1810)
- Compiled and edited the first official, authorized version of "The Laws of the United States of America" (1796), commonly cited as "Folwell's Statutes" based on the identity of the publisher Richard Folwell.

== Notes ==
Party political offices
Preceded by Timothy Pitkin	Federalist nominee for Governor of Connecticut; 1822, 1823	Succeeded by Timothy Pitkin
U.S. House of Representatives
Preceded by District created	Member of the U.S. House of Representatives from Connecticut's at-large congressional district 1793–1797	Succeeded by John Allen
