= Dios Hieron (Ionia) =

Town of ancient Ionia, between Lebedus and Colophon

Coordinates: 38°01′46″N 27°04′52″E

Dios Hieron (Ancient Greek: Διὸς Ἱερόν, meaning 'Sanctuary of Zeus') was a town of ancient Ionia, between Lebedus and Colophon. The position which Stephanus of Byzantium assigns to the place seems to agree with the narrative in Thucydides where it is mentioned. It belonged to the Delian League since it is mentioned in tribute records of Athens between the years 454/3 and 416/5 BCE. On the other hand, an Athenian decree of the year 427/6 BCE indicates that at that time Dios Hieron was dependent on Colophon. Thucydides writes that in the year 412 BCE the Chians, after revolting against the Athenians, equipped several ships with the intention of encouraging other cities to revolt. They were in Annaea and then in Dios Hieron, where they met the Athenian ships that were under the command of Diomedon. The Chian ships fled from there to Ephesus and Teos. Pliny the Elder says that in his time, the people of Dios Hieron came to Ephesus to settle their legal affairs.

Its site is located near Kurukemer, İzmir Province, Turkey.
