= David Plant =

American politician (1783–1851)

Member of the U.S. House of Representatives from Connecticut's at-large district
- In office March 4, 1827 – March 3, 1829
- Preceded by: Gideon Tomlinson
- Succeeded by: William W. Ellsworth

30th Lieutenant Governor of Connecticut
- In office May 7, 1823 – May 2, 1827
- Governor: Oliver Wolcott Jr.
- Preceded by: Jonathan Ingersoll
- Succeeded by: John Peters

1st Speaker of the Connecticut House of Representatives
- In office 1819–1820
- Preceded by: Position established
- Succeeded by: Elisha Phelps

Personal details
- Born: March 29, 1783 Stratford, Connecticut
- Died: 18 October 1851 (aged 68) Stratford, Connecticut
- Party: Toleration Party (1819–1822); National Republican Party (1823–1828)
- Education: Yale College; Litchfield Law School

David Plant (March 29, 1783 – October 18, 1851) was a United States representative from Connecticut. Born in Stratford, Connecticut, Plant attended the Episcopal Academy in Cheshire, Connecticut, and graduated from Yale College in 1804. He studied law at the Litchfield Law School and was admitted to the bar in 1804. Plant practiced law in Stratford and became a judge of the probate court of Fairfield County.

Plant was a member of the Connecticut House of Representatives from 1817 to 1820 and served as its first speaker in 1819 and 1820. He was a Connecticut state senator in 1821 and 1822. The following year he became Lieutenant Governor of Connecticut, a position he held until 1827.

That year he was elected as an anti-Jacksonian Member of the U.S. House of Representatives of the Twentieth Congress, which was in session from March 4, 1827, until March 3, 1829. He did not seek re-election as an Adams man in 1828, but he did receive a small number of votes as a Jacksonian candidate, as he had in the 1825 and 1826 gubernatorial elections. Afterwards, he returned to his law practice in Connecticut. David Plant died in Stratford in 1851 and was buried in the Congregational Burying Ground.

Political offices
Preceded by Jonathan Ingersoll	Lieutenant Governor of Connecticut; 1823–1827	Succeeded by John Samuel Peters
U.S. House of Representatives
Preceded by Gideon Tomlinson	Member of the U.S. House of Representatives from Connecticut's at-large congressional district 1827–1829	Succeeded by William W. Ellsworth
