= David Daggett =

American judge and politician (1764–1851)

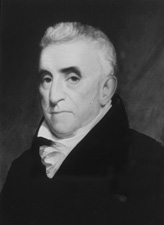

United States Senator from Connecticut
- In office May 13, 1813 – March 3, 1819
- Preceded by: Chauncey Goodrich
- Succeeded by: James Lanman

Member of the Connecticut House of Representatives
- In office 1791–1797

Personal details
- Born: December 31, 1764 Attleboro, Massachusetts
- Died: April 12, 1851 (aged 86) New Haven, Connecticut, U.S.
- Party: Federalist

David Daggett (December 31, 1764 – April 12, 1851) was a U.S. senator, mayor of New Haven, Connecticut, Judge of the Connecticut Supreme Court of Errors, and a founder of the Yale Law School. He helped block plans for the first college for African Americans in the United States and presided over the conviction of a woman running a boarding school for African Americans in violation of Connecticut's recently passed Black Law. He judged African Americans not to be citizens and supported their colonization to Africa.

== Life ==
He was born in Attleboro, Massachusetts, December 31, 1764, the son of Thomas Daggett. The history of Daggett's family in Massachusetts is a distinguished one. The original Daggett, John, came over from England with Winthrop's company, in 1630, and settled in Watertown.

At the age of 16, David enrolled at Yale College, entering the junior class two years early. It appears likely that he entered Yale rather than Harvard, which was closer, because his father's cousin had been an officer at Yale. He graduated with high honor in 1783 and then earned a master's degree. Daggett was in the same class with Samuel Austin, Abiel Holmes and John Cotton Smith.

Upon receiving his master's degree, he received the unusual honor of having his commencement speech published. This marked the beginning of his reputation as a formidable orator.

In 1786, at the age of 21, he married Ann Munson. They were married for 53 years, until she died in July 1839 at the age of 72. Daggett had 19 children, but only 14 lived any considerable time, and only three survived him. One son was clergyman Oliver Ellsworth Daggett. One daughter, Susan Edwards Daggett, married Chaplain of the Senate Reverend Sereno Edwards Dwight, son of the President of Yale, Timothy Dwight IV.

After leaving Yale, he studied law under Charles Chauncey of New Haven (who later became a judge of the Superior Court). He supported himself by working as a butler and as a preceptor at Hopkins Grammar School. In January 1786, at the age of 21, he was admitted to the bar of New Haven County and immediately set up his own practice, turning down an offer to be a tutor at Yale.

While in his 20s, Daggett published and sold the "confession" of Joseph Mountain, an African American executed publicly before a crowd estimated at 10,000 in New Haven for rape.

Dagget was elected a member of the American Antiquarian Society in 1815.

In November 1824, Daggett became an associate instructor of the New Haven Law School under Samuel Johnson Hitchcock; and in 1826, he was appointed Kent Professor of Law at Yale. He held these positions until health conditions forced him to resign. In the autumn of 1826, he received from Yale the honorary degree of LL.D.

In May 1840, Daggett married Mary Lines, who was with him at the time of his death. He died in New Haven, Connecticut, and was interred at Grove Street Cemetery.

== Politics ==
Daggett was admitted to the bar and entered into public life two years before the adoption of the Constitution of the United States. As did most of the people of New England, at that time, Dagget aligned himself with the Federalist Party.

In 1791, he was chosen to represent the town of New Haven in the General Assembly (Connecticut State House of Representatives), and was annually re-elected for six years, until 1797, when he was chosen a member of the Connecticut State Council, or Upper House. Though one of the youngest members of the House, he soon became one of the most influential, and in 1794, three years after he entered it, he was chosen to preside over it as Speaker, at the age of 29. Daggett returned to the House for a one-year term in 1805.

In 1797, Daggett was elected to the Connecticut State Council, and he retained his seat there for seven years, until he resigned it in 1804. He returned to the Council in 1809, retaining his seat until he was elected to the U.S. Senate in 1813.

As well as holding a seat on the council, he was appointed State's Attorney for the county of New Haven in June 1811, and continued in that office until he resigned it when chosen Senator in 1813.

He was elected to the Senate as a Federalist to fill the vacancy caused by the resignation of Chauncey Goodrich and served from May 13, 1813, to March 3, 1819. In 1825 and 1826, Daggett was an unsuccessful nominee for governor of Connecticut, losing in a landslide both times to incumbent Oliver Wolcott Jr.

In May 1826, at age 62, he was chosen an associate judge of the Connecticut Supreme Court of Errors. He was appointed to that office by a Legislature in which a decided majority was opposed to him in political principles and preferences, and yet the respect he had garnered as a public official and lawyer swayed their vote in his favor.

He served as the Mayor of New Haven, Connecticut, from 1828 to 1829.

In May 1832, he was made Chief Justice of the Connecticut Supreme Court of Errors. He continued in that office until December 31, 1834; 70 years was the limit that the state constitution assigned to the judicial office, and in May 1834, it was reported that the governor had notified the state senate that following Daggett's approaching 70th birthday, he would no longer be legally eligible to serve on the court.

== Daggett and race issues ==
In 1831, Simeon Jocelyn and others proposed establishing a college for negros in New Haven; there was none in the United States, and the admission of blacks into existing colleges was rare. Daggett led the opposition to this plan, which was scuttled at a town meeting when a resolution against it that Daggett helped draft was passed by a vote of a 700 to 4. At the same meeting an anti-abolitionism resolution he also helped draft was passed: "The propagation of sentiments favorable to the immediate emancipation of slaves in disregard of the civil institutions of the States in which they belong, and as auxiliary thereto the contemporaneous founding of Colleges for educating colored people, is unwarrantable and dangerous interference with the internal concerns of other States, and ought to be discouraged."

After the "Negro college" affair, Daggett continued to oppose the expansion of education for blacks. In 1833, Prudence Crandall admitted a black student to her female academy. The citizens first warned her, then withdrew their daughters from the school. Crandall reopened the school exclusively for black women. Canterbury passed a bill stipulating that the selectmen of the town had to approve any out-of-state students of color seeking an education. Crandall was arrested for violating this law. Chief Justice Daggett ruled in 1833 that, since free black people could not be U.S. citizens, they could be prevented from being educated.

In 1835, Daggett undertook another town meeting linking states' rights, pro-colonization and anti-abolitionism. This meeting, held at the statehouse on September 9, 1835, found Noah Webster, Simeon Baldwin, and others helping to frame resolutions that condemned any interference by Congress with the treatment of slaves within any of the states, opposed the use of the mail for "transmission of incendiary information", proposed African colonization for "the free colored population", and "viewed with alarm the efforts of the abolitionists".

Throughout the 1830s, Daggett consistently opposed education and supported colonization for free blacks. During this time, he served as chief justice of Connecticut's Supreme Court and as Yale's only full professor of law. In 1844, however, Daggett voted to restore the vote to blacks in a state referendum.

Party political offices
Preceded by Timothy Pitkin	Federalist nominee for Governor of Connecticut; 1825, 1826	Succeeded by None
U.S. Senate
Preceded by Chauncey Goodrich	U.S. senator (Class 3) from Connecticut; 1813–1819; Served alongside: Samuel W. Dana	Succeeded by James Lanman
Political offices
Preceded by William Bristol	Mayors of New Haven, Connecticut; 1828	Succeeded by Ebenezer Seeley
Honorary titles
Preceded by William Plumer	Oldest living U.S. senator December 22, 1850 – April 12, 1851	Succeeded by Elisha Mathewson
