= Aeneas Internet and Telephone =

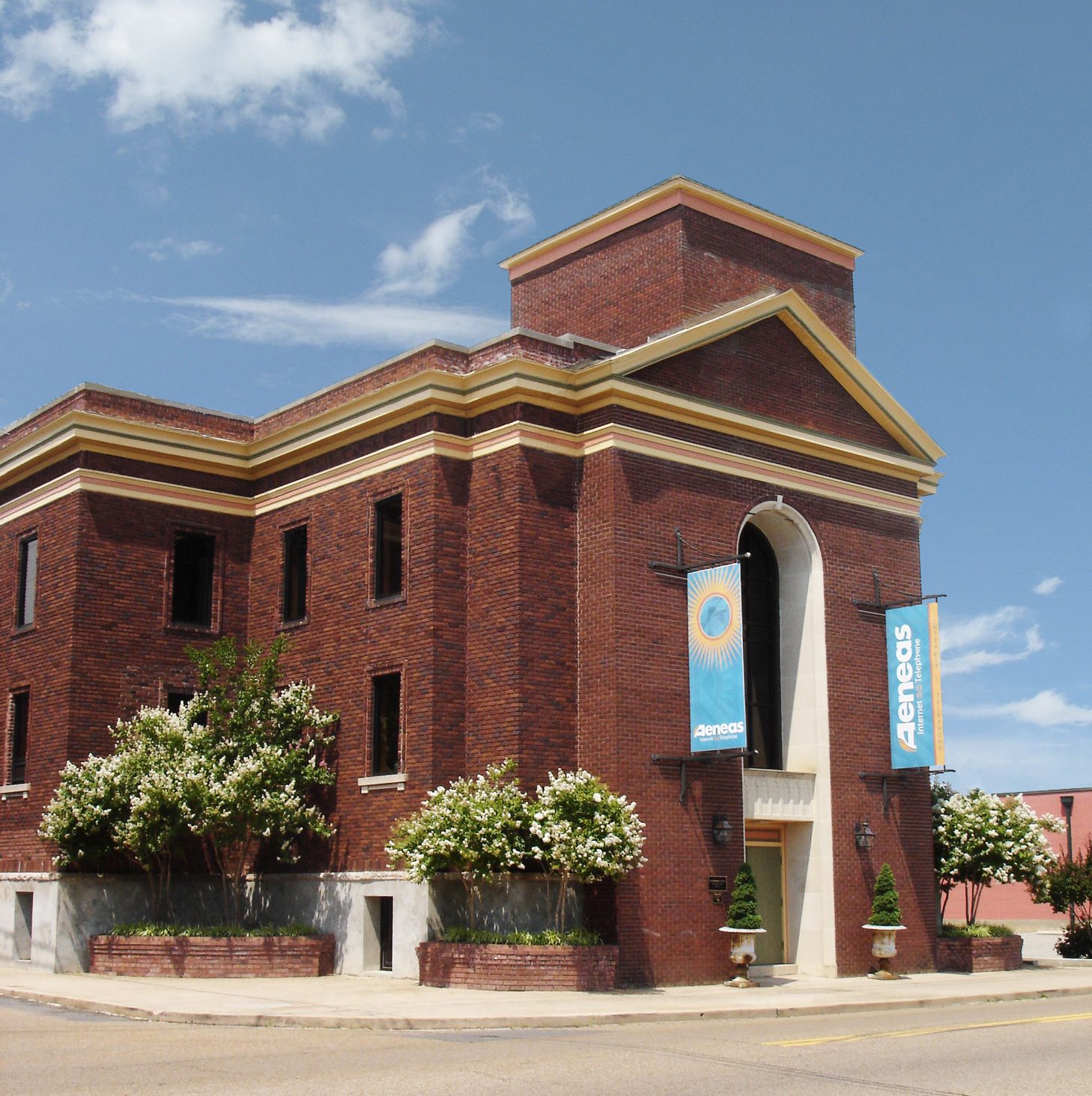
- Aeneas Building
- Type: Telecommunications
- Industry: Telecommunications; Internet service provider Colocation (business); Business telephone systems Wide area network
- Founded: 1995 (as Aeneas Internet Services)
- Headquarters: Jackson, Tennessee, United States
- Website: Official website

Aeneas Internet and Telephone is an American provider of telecommunications services in Tennessee, with headquarters located in Jackson.

== History ==
The company was established in 1995 by Jonathan Harlan under the name Aeneas Internet Services. Harlan served as CEO from 1995 until August 2018. Stephen Thorpe took over as CEO of Aeneas Internet and Telephone in August 2018.

Aeneas offers fiber internet and phone services to residents in Tennessee.

In May 2003, Aeneas headquarters was hit by a tornado, but was able to restore operations within four days. In 2004, Homeland Security featured Aeneas in a national advertising campaign regarding this recovery. In July 2018, Aeneas expanded its services to Hardeman County.

In 2020, the company in partnership with STEMC, expanded its activity to Tipton County.
