= Oliver Wolcott Jr. =

American judge and politician (1760–1833)

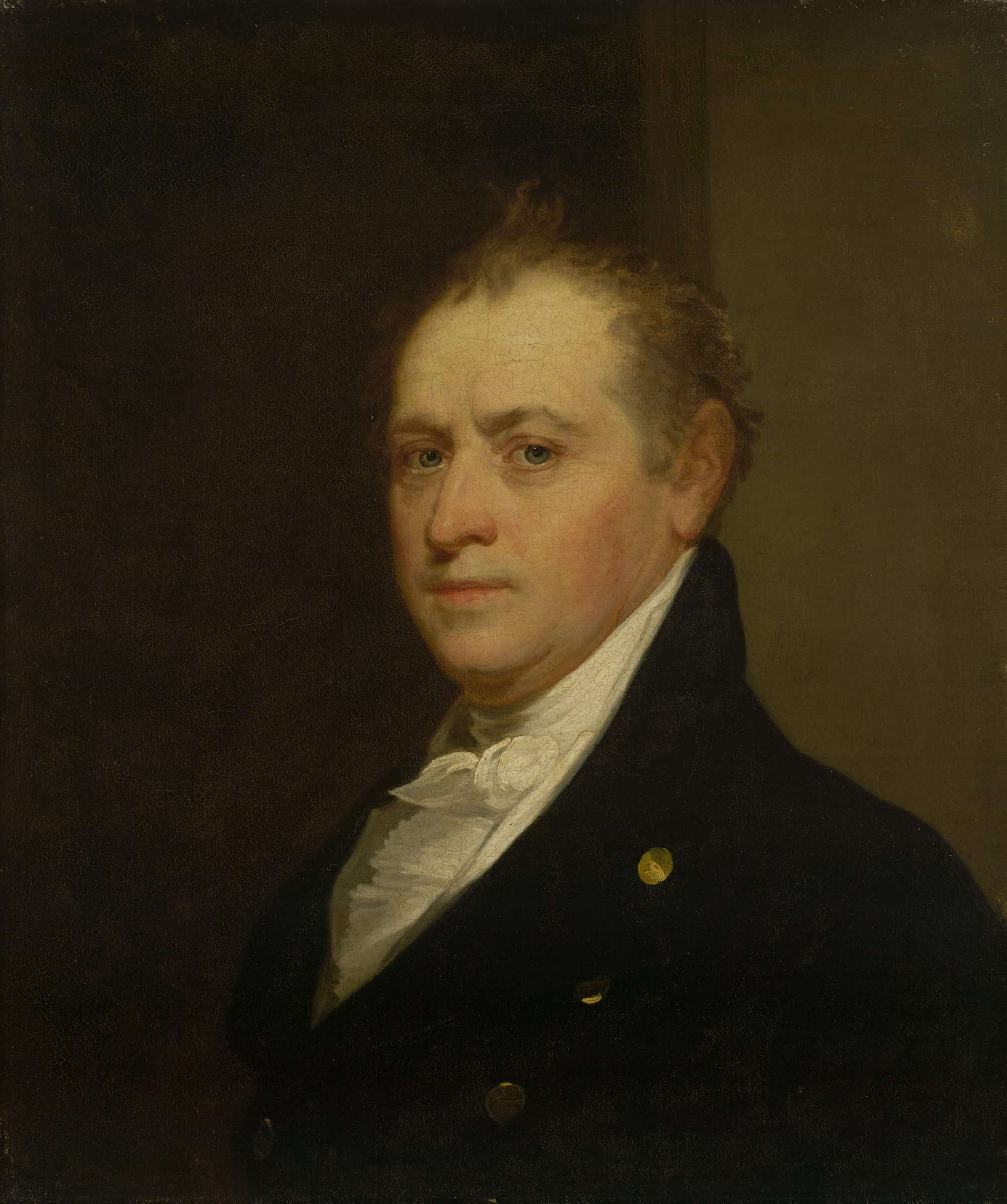
- Portrait by Gilbert Stuart, c. 1820

24th Governor of Connecticut
- In office May 8, 1817 – May 2, 1827
- Lieutenant: Jonathan Ingersoll; David Plant
- Preceded by: John Cotton Smith
- Succeeded by: Gideon Tomlinson

Judge of the United States Circuit Court for the Second Circuit
- In office February 20, 1801 – July 1, 1802
- Appointed by: John Adams
- Preceded by: Seat established by 2 Stat. 89
- Succeeded by: Seat abolished

2nd United States Secretary of the Treasury
- In office February 3, 1795 – December 31, 1800
- President: George Washington; John Adams
- Preceded by: Alexander Hamilton
- Succeeded by: Samuel Dexter

Comptroller of the Treasury
- In office 1791–1795

Auditor of the US Treasury Department
- In office 1789–1791

Comptroller of Public Accounts for Connecticut
- In office 1788–1789

Personal details
- Born: Oliver Wolcott Jr. January 11, 1760 Litchfield, Connecticut Colony, British America
- Died: June 1, 1833 (aged 73) New York City, New York, U.S.
- Party: Federalist (Before 1816); Toleration (1816-1827); Jacksonian (1827-1829)
- Parent: Oliver Wolcott Sr. (father)
- Relatives: Roger Wolcott
- Education: Yale University read law

Military service
- Branch/service: Continental Army
- Years of service: 1777-1779
- Battles/wars: American Revolutionary War

Oliver Wolcott Jr. (January 11, 1760 – June 1, 1833) was an American politician and judge. He was the second United States secretary of the treasury, a judge of the United States Circuit Court for the Second Circuit, and the 24th governor of Connecticut. His adult life began with working in Connecticut, followed by participating in the U.S. federal government in the Department of Treasury, before returning to Connecticut, where he spent his life before his death. Throughout his time in politics, Wolcott's political views shifted from Federalist, to Toleration, and finally Jacksonian. Oliver Wolcott Jr. is the son to Oliver Wolcott Sr., part of the Griswold-Wolcott family.

== Early life ==
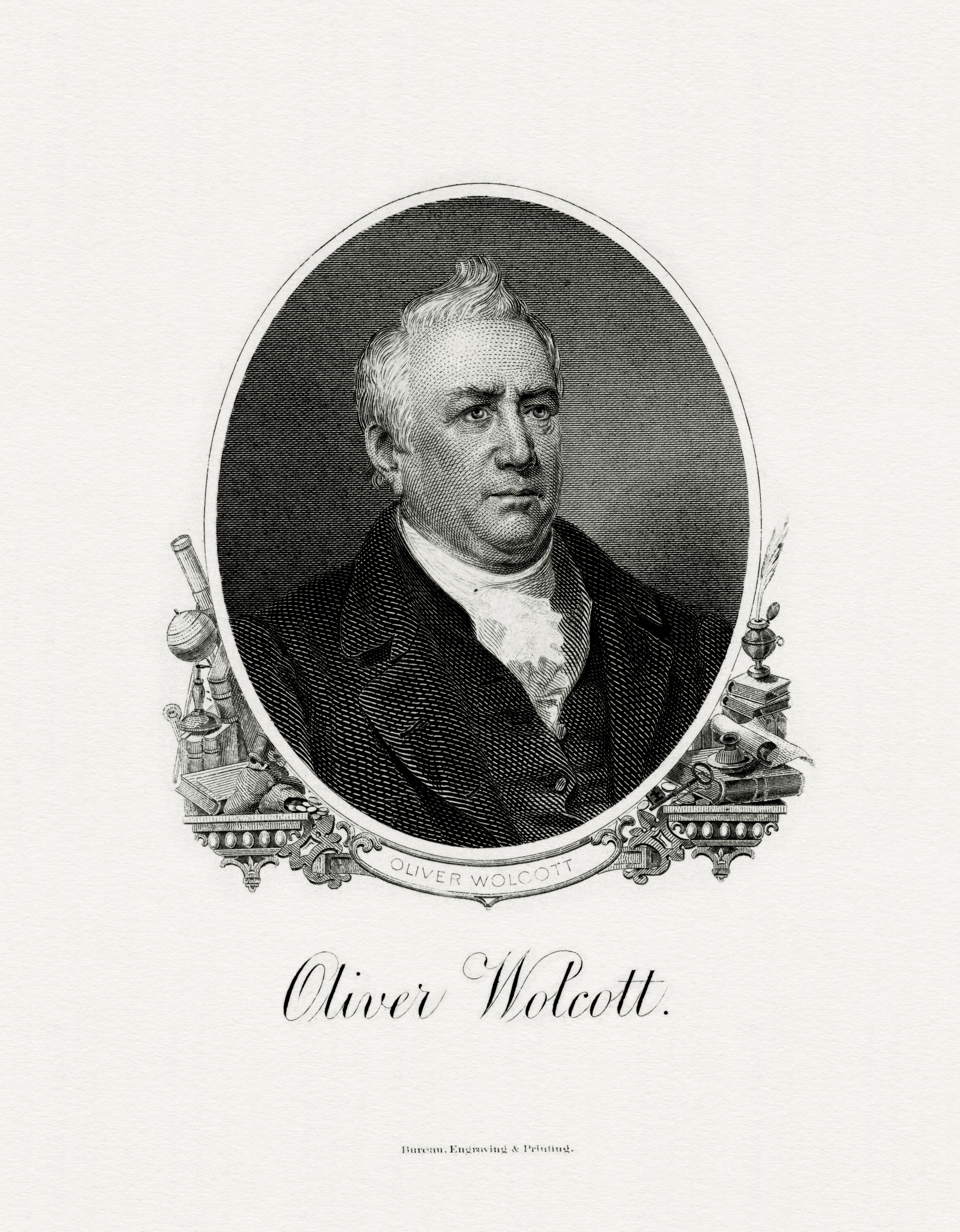
Bureau of Engraving and Printing portrait of Wolcott as Secretary of the Treasury

Born on January 11, 1760, in Litchfield, Connecticut Colony, British America, Wolcott served in the Continental Army from 1777 to 1779, during the American Revolutionary War, then graduated from Yale University in 1778, where he was a member of Brothers in Unity and read law in 1781.

Oliver Wolcott Jr. and the Wolcott family were part of the Standing Order in Connecticut. This was a small group of families that were the elite members of Connecticut society, influencing politics, religion, and social power. John Adams compared them to the aristocracy of Connecticut. Wolcott Jr. developed his own sense of beliefs that differed from the Standing Order and was more inclusive of the general population in Connecticut.

== Career ==
He was clerk of the Connecticut Committee on Pay-Table from 1781 to 1782. He was a member of the Connecticut Committee on Pay-Table from 1782 to 1784. This group was responsible for accounting Connecticut's military expenses during the American Revolution.

Wolcott was also commissioner to settle claims of Connecticut against the United States from 1784 to 1788. He was Comptroller of Public Accounts for Connecticut from 1788 to 1789. He was Auditor for the United States Department of the Treasury from 1789 to 1791. He was Comptroller for the United States Department of the Treasury from 1791 to 1795. During this time he worked closely with Alexander Hamilton, providing the background information for many of Hamilton's more important projects and reports. He was a commission merchant in New York City from 1793 to 1815. He was the 2nd Secretary of the Treasury from 1795 to 1800.

=== Treasury Department ===
Before becoming the 2nd Secretary of Treasury, Wolcott was the first Auditor in the Treasury Department. According to Richard White, his duties as Auditor consisted of making the first examination of accounts and determining balances on all claims against the government. Working under the 1st Secretary of Treasury Alexander Hamilton and a fellow Federalist, this opened Wolcott up to attacks from Thomas Jefferson, as Hamilton and Jefferson were the de facto leaders of the first political parties: Hamilton's Federalists and Jefferson's Democratic Republicans.

The growing size and procedures of the federal government were implemented by bureaucrats like Wolcott. Wolcott was responsible for the branch system of the Bank of the United States that was approved by stockholders. Wolcott's loyalty was rewarded when the Comptroller at the time, Nicholas Eveleigh, died in the spring of 1791. Hamilton wrote to Washington recommending Wolcott for the position on April 17, 1791, before Washington followed Hamilton's recommendation. As Comptroller, Wolcott was responsible for supervising the collection of duties on impost and tonnage.

Hamilton resigned as Secretary of the Treasury in January 1795. President Washington appointed Wolcott to be the 2nd Secretary of the Treasury. While Wolcott was Secretary of the Treasury, he maintained close contact with Alexander Hamilton. Hamilton was able to influence Washington's cabinet remotely through Wolcott as Secretary of the Treasury thanks to Wolcott's loyalty when he worked under Hamilton as the 1st Secretary of the Treasury. This would no longer be the case when John Adams, a rival of Hamilton, became president in 1797. Apart from the Hamilton and Adams rivalry, Democratic Republicans continued their growing influence in government and attempts to oppose the Federalists. Albert Gallatin, a Jeffersonian, created the Ways and Means committee for Congress and the Legislature Branch to participate in determining financial policy and reduce the treasury's growing power. Wolcott had major responsibility for financing the Quasi-War with France in 1798–1800.

=== Martha Washington's escaped slave ===
On May 21, 1796, one of Martha Washington's slaves, Oney Judge (sometimes known as Ona), escaped from the Executive Mansion in Philadelphia, where she lived with the Washingtons during his presidency, serving as Washington's chambermaid. As Secretary, Wolcott was George Washington's intermediary in getting the Collector of Customs for Portsmouth, New Hampshire, Joseph Whipple, to capture and send Judge to Mount Vernon, where she had begun serving the Washingtons. Whipple met with Judge, discussed why she had escaped and tried to ascertain the facts of the case. After she told him she did not desire to be a slave again, Whipple refused to remove Judge against her will, said that it could cause civil unrest because of abolitionists, and recommended for the president to go through the courts if necessary.

In their correspondence, Washington said that he wanted to avoid controversy, so he did not use the courts to take advantage of the method that he had signed into law under the Fugitive Slave Act of 1793. Whipple was aware that Wolcott and Washington both wanted Ona Judge to be captured, even if that meant her being rounded up in the middle of the night. Whipple's background in New Hampshire and family's emancipation of slaves in the 1780s remained in the background throughout this episode. Wolcott reported back to Washington that Judge would return as his slave if she could expect emancipation at some point, and that Whipple wanted out of the attempt to bring Judge back into captivity. Washington relieved Wolcott of his task of returning Ona Judge on November 28, 1796.

Washington allegedly made another attempt to apprehend Judge in 1798 through his nephew, Burwell Bassett, but considering Bassett's spurious political alignment the allegation is unlikely at best and fraudulent at worst. According to the purported request, he was instructed to convince her to return or to take her by force, but Judge was warned by Senator John Langdon and hid. Wolcott's involvement with this case ended after his first attempt to return Judge to slavery.

=== Federal judicial service ===
Wolcott was nominated by President John Adams on February 18, 1801, to the United States Circuit Court for the Second Circuit, to a new seat authorized by 2 Stat. 89. He was confirmed by the United States Senate on February 20, 1801, and received his commission the same day. His service terminated on July 1, 1802, due to the abolition of the court.

=== Post Federal career ===
Wolcott was a farmer from 1815 to 1816. He was the 24th Governor of Connecticut from 1817 to 1827. He was a candidate for Governor of Connecticut in 1827. He was the 5th Grand Master of the Most Worshipful Grand Lodge of the State of Connecticut of Ancient, Free & Accepted Masons from 1818 to 1820.

=== Governor of Connecticut ===
Wolcott was elected as Governor of Connecticut in April 1817. He was the 3rd Wolcott to be governor of Connecticut, following his father and grandfather. During his time as governor, Wolcott Jr. became known for his moderate views that placed priority on Connecticut, not politics. This marked a shift in Connecticut governance prior to Oliver Wolcott Jr. Wolcott was head of the constitution convention and committee that drafted a new Connecticut constitution in 1818. Some of the changes found in the document included improving manufacturing laws, lowering taxes, prison reform, expanding voting for white males, religious freedom from the Congregational Church, and emigration.

== Death ==
Wolcott died on June 1, 1833, in New York City. He was the last surviving cabinet member of the Washington administration.

== Legacy ==
The town of Wolcott, Connecticut, was named in honor of Oliver Jr. and his father Oliver Sr.

== Works ==
- Memoirs of the Administration of Washington and John Adams, edited by George Gibbs (1846)

== Sources ==
- Chernow, Ron (2004). Alexander Hamilton. New York: Penguin Books. pp. 479–627. ISBN 978-0143034759.

Political offices
Preceded by Alexander Hamilton	2nd United States Secretary of the Treasury; 1795–1800	Succeeded by Samuel Dexter
Preceded by John Cotton Smith	24th Governor of Connecticut; 1817–1827	Succeeded by Gideon Tomlinson
Legal offices
Preceded by Seat established by 2 Stat. 89	Judge of the United States Circuit Court for the Second Circuit; 1801–1802	Succeeded by Seat abolished
Party political offices
Preceded by Elijah Boardman	Democratic-Republican nominee for Governor of Connecticut; 1816, 1817, 1818, 1819, 1820, 1821, 1822, 1823, 1824, 1825, 1826, 1827	Succeeded by Gideon Tomlinson (National Republican)
