= Joseph Mountain =

African American man executed publicly in 1790

Joseph Mountain (c. 1758 – 1790) was an African American man who was executed publicly for rape and had an account of his purported "criminal confession" published. David Daggett published his "confession" in Sketches of the life of Joseph Mountain,: a Negro, who was executed at New-Haven, on the 20th day of October, 1790, for a rape, committed on the 26th day of May last. Daggett was a founder of Yale Law School who served as mayor of New Haven, state representative, U.S. Senator, and judge on Connecticut's highest court. He denigrated African Americans, opposed educating them, led efforts to block plans for a college for African Americans in New Haven, and presided over the trial of a woman who was blocked from admitting an African American girl from her boarding school and then prosecuted for establishing a boarding school for African American girls in Canterbury, Connecticut.

The crowd at Mountain's execution was estimated to be 10,000. Depictions of African Americans as beastly rapists were common and dozens were executed for the crime.

Thomas and Samuel Green who established several of Connecticut's first newspapers published the "criminal confession" written by Daggett about Mountain.
