= Nebria aenea =

Scientific classification
- Domain: Eukaryota
- Kingdom: Animalia
- Phylum: Arthropoda
- Class: Insecta
- Order: Coleoptera
- Suborder: Adephaga
- Family: Carabidae
- Genus: Nebria
- Species: N. aenea

Binomial name
- Nebria aenea Gebler, 1825

Species of beetle

Nebria aenea is a species of black coloured ground beetle in the Nebriinae subfamily that can be found in Kazakhstan and Russia.
