= Annaea =

City in ancient Ionia

Coordinates: 37°47′29″N 27°16′13″E

Annaea or Annaia (Ancient Greek: Ἄνναια) or Anaea or Anaia (Ἀναία), was a town of ancient Ionia. Stephanus of Byzantium placed it in Caria, opposite Samos. Pausanias also puts it on the mainland across from Samos and says it was fortified by the people of that island after being displaced by Androklos of Ephesos. After ten years of mustering forces at Anaia, they were able to launch a force back across and reclaim Samos. Ephorus says that it was named after Anaea, an Amazon who was buried there. If Anaea was opposite Samos, it was in Ionia (or, well into Roman times, Lydia), which did not extend south of the Maeander River. Thucydides suggests it was on or near the coast, and in or near the valley of the Maeander, and that it was a naval station, close enough Samos to annoy the Samians. Some Samian exiles lived there during the Peloponnesian War.

It later became a bishopric, now a titular see (see Anaea (Asia)).

Its site is located near Kadı Kalesi, Aydın Province, Turkey.
