= Aeneas Munson =

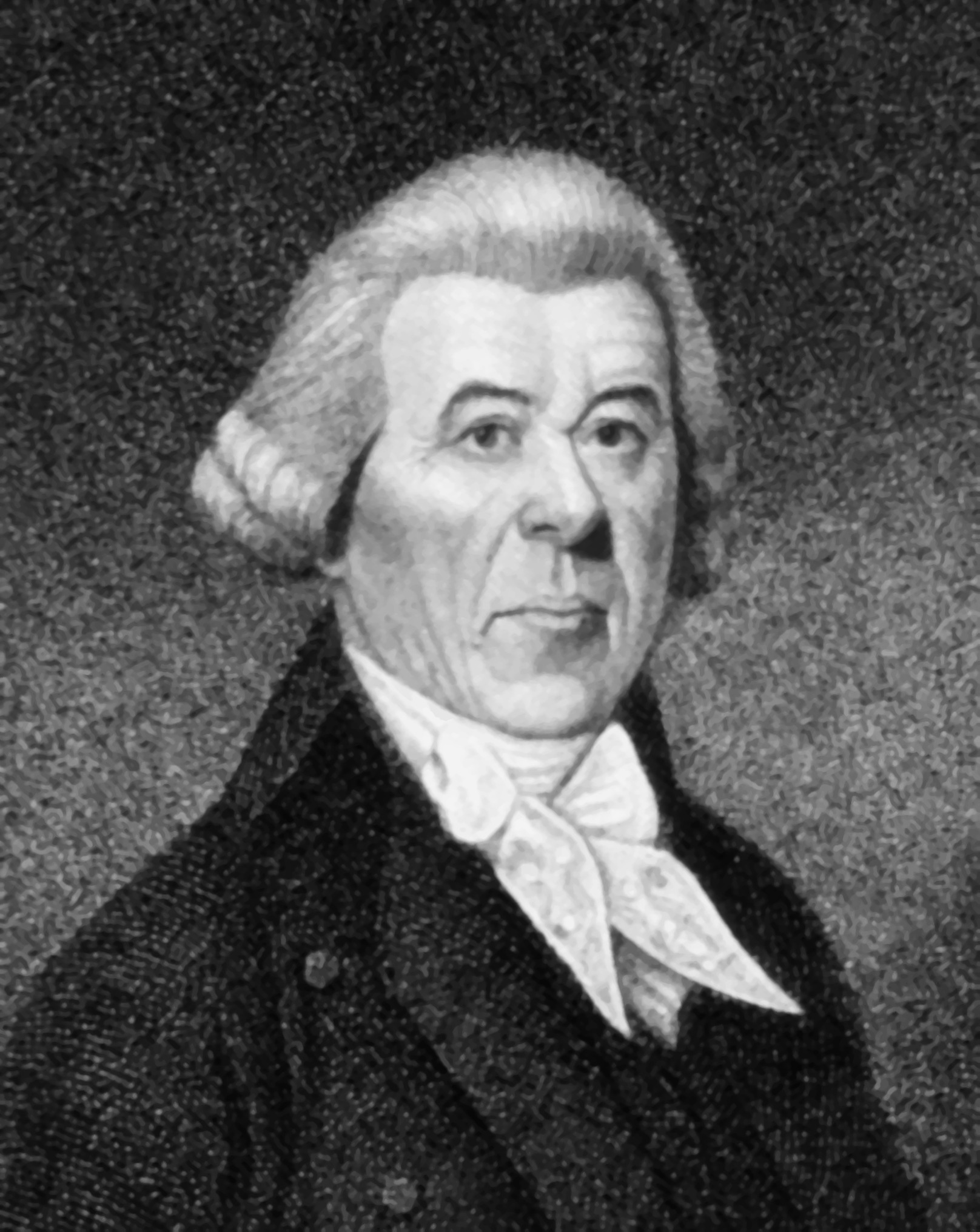
Aeneas Munson

Æneas Munson (born in New Haven, Connecticut Colony, June 24, 1734; died there, June 16, 1826) was an American medical doctor.

== Biography ==
He graduated from Yale in 1753, and, after being a tutor there and studying divinity under Yale president Ezra Stiles, served as chaplain in the army on Long Island in 1755. He studied medicine under John Darby, and began practice at Bedford, New York, in 1756. In 1760 he moved to New Haven where he resided for more than 50 years. From 1794 to 1901 he was president of the Medical Society of Connecticut, which grew out of the New Haven County Medical Association, of which he had been a founder and president. He was professor at Yale Medical School from its establishment in the early 1810s, where he held the first Chair of Materia Medica and Botany, until his death. He was known to have had an interest in alchemy.

During the American Revolutionary War, he was a surgeon's mate in Scammell's 1781 Light Infantry Regiment, and was often a member of the legislature.
