= Nathan Smith (politician) =

American politician (1770–1835)

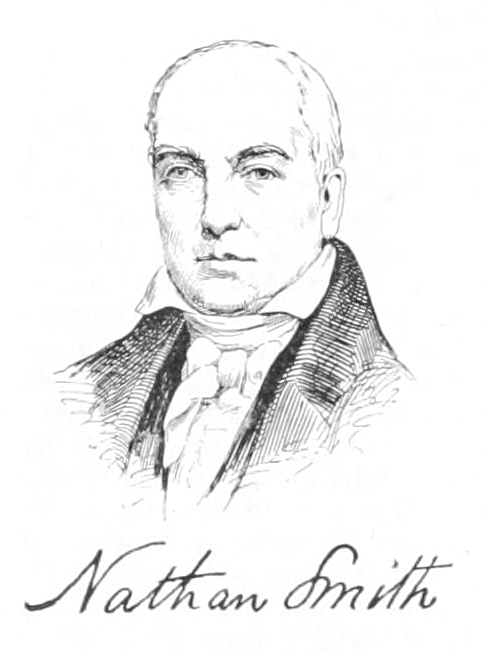

United States Senator from Connecticut
- In office March 4, 1833 – December 6, 1835
- Preceded by: Samuel A. Foot
- Succeeded by: John M. Niles

United States Attorney for the District of Connecticut
- In office 1829–1829
- President: Andrew Jackson
- Preceded by: Hezekiah Huntington
- Succeeded by: Asa Child

Personal details
- Born: January 8, 1770 Woodbury, Connecticut Colony, British America
- Died: December 6, 1835 (aged 65) Washington, D.C.
- Party: National Republican
- Education: Litchfield Law School
- Occupation: lawyer politician

Nathan Smith (January 8, 1770 – December 6, 1835) was a United States senator from Connecticut.

== Biography ==
Nathan Smith was born in Woodbury, Connecticut, son of Richard and Annis (Hurd) Smith; brother of Nathaniel Smith and uncle of Truman Smith. He received a modest education. He studied law with his brother and at Litchfield Law School in 1790; was admitted to the bar in 1792, and commenced the practice of his profession in New Haven. In 1808 Smith received an honorary master's from Yale. He was also an incorporator of Washington College, later known as Trinity College in Hartford, Connecticut.

== Career ==
Smith was prosecuting attorney for New Haven County from 1817 until his death in 1835. He was also a delegate to the State constitutional convention in 1818. In 1825, he was an unsuccessful candidate for governor of Connecticut, but was appointed United States Attorney for the district of Connecticut, serving in 1828 and 1829.

Elected as a National Republican to the United States Senate, Smith served from March 4, 1833, until his death. He was 63 when he took his seat in the US Senate, one of the oldest serving members of that body and his only time in elected office.

== Death ==
Smith died in Washington, D.C., on December 6, 1835 (age 65 years, 332 days). President Jackson and his Cabinet attended Smith's funeral in the Senate Chamber and there was also a large funeral service held in New Haven. He is interred at the Grove Street Cemetery, New Haven, Connecticut. There is a cenotaph at Congressional Cemetery, Washington, D.C.

== See also ==
- List of members of the United States Congress who died in office (1790–1899)

Party political offices
Preceded by Timothy Pitkin	Federalist nominee for Governor of Connecticut; 1820	Succeeded by Timothy Pitkin
U.S. Senate
Preceded by Samuel A. Foot	U.S. senator (Class 1) from Connecticut; 1833–1835; Served alongside: Gideon Tomlinson	Succeeded by John M. Niles
