= Timothy Pitkin =

American lawyer, politician and historian (1766-1847)

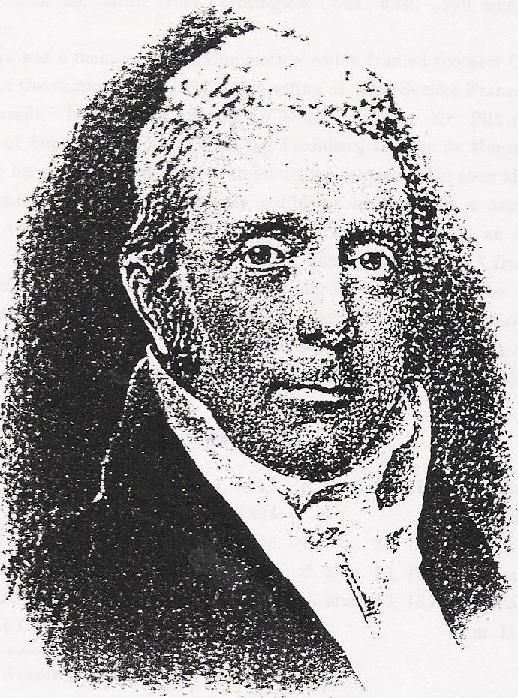

Speaker of the Connecticut House of Representatives

Member of the Connecticut House of Representatives
- In office 1803–1805
- Preceded by: John Chester
- Succeeded by: Lyman Law

Member of the Connecticut House of Representatives
- In office 1790; 1792; 1794–1805; 1819–1830

Member of the U.S. House of Representatives from Connecticut's at-large district
- In office September 16, 1805 – March 3, 1819

Personal details
- Born: 21 January 1766 Farmington, Connecticut
- Died: 18 December 1847 (Aged 81) New Haven, Connecticut, U.S.
- Party: Federalist Party
- Education: Yale University

Timothy Pitkin (January 21, 1766 – December 18, 1847) was an American lawyer, politician, and historian.

He graduated from Yale in 1785, taught in the academy at Plainfield, Connecticut, for a year, studied law, and was admitted to the bar in 1788. He served in the State Legislature of Connecticut in 1790, 1792, and 1794‑1805, serving as Clerk of the House 1800‑1802 and as Speaker 1803‑1805. He was elected as a Federalist to the United States Congress in the Ninth Congress to fill in part the vacancies caused by the resignations of Calvin Goddard and Roger Griswold; and was re-elected to the Tenth and to the five succeeding Congresses, thus serving from September 16, 1805, to March 3, 1819.

Pitkin was elected a member of the American Antiquarian Society in 1815.

He was not a candidate for renomination to the federal Congress in 1818, but was a delegate to the convention which framed the new state constitution in that year. Resuming his private law practice, he also returned to serve as a member of the Connecticut state House of Representatives from 1819 to 1830. His writing on and gathering of statistical materials are the accomplishments which accord him a special place in the history of the United States. Written with great care, A Statistical View of the Commerce of the United States of America (1816) and Political and Civil History of the United States from 1763 to the Close of Washington's Administration (2 volumes, 1828) are valuable reference works for students of American history. He is buried in New Haven, in Grove Street Cemetery.

He was the maternal uncle of Roger Sherman Baldwin's wife Emily Pitkin Perkins.

Party political offices
Preceded by John Cotton Smith	Federalist nominee for Governor of Connecticut; 1818, 1819	Succeeded by Nathan Smith
Preceded by Nathan Smith	Federalist nominee for Governor of Connecticut; 1822, 1823	Succeeded by Zephaniah Swift
Preceded by Zephaniah Swift	Federalist nominee for Governor of Connecticut; 1824	Succeeded by David Daggett
U.S. House of Representatives
Preceded by Roger Griswold	Member of the U.S. House of Representatives from Connecticut's at-large congressional district 1805–1819	Succeeded by John Russ
