= Toleration Party =

Political party in Connecticut

- Leader: Pierpont Edwards; Oliver Wolcott Jr.
- Founded: 1816
- Dissolved: 1828
- Split from: Democratic-Republican Party
- Merged into: Democratic Party
- Headquarters: New Haven, Connecticut
- Ideology: Anti-clericalism; Episcopalian interests Secularism
- Colors: Sarum blue

The Toleration Party, also known as the Toleration-Republican Party and later the American Party or American Toleration and Reform Party, was a political party that dominated the political life of Connecticut from 1817 to 1827. The American name referred not to nativism or the later Know Nothing, which was also known as the American Party, but to the party's national orientation.

The party was formed by an alliance of the more conservative Episcopalians with the Democratic-Republicans, as a result of the discrimination of the Episcopal Church by the Congregationalist state government. In the 1817 elections, the Toleration Party swept control of the General Assembly. At the Connecticut Constitutional Convention in 1817, 111 of the 201 convention delegates belonged to the Toleration Party. The resulting Constitution of 1818 generally adhered to the Tolerationist platform, especially their two major issues: increasing the electorate and the democratic nature of the government and disestablishing the Congregational Church. By the end of the 1820s, the Tolerationists had developed into the Jacksonian branch of the Connecticut Democratic Party.

== Federalist/Congregationalist domination ==
The Federalist Party had been dominant in Connecticut, holding a near-monopoly on power, since its foundation. The Democratic-Republican Party was established in Connecticut in 1801 but succeeded in winning merely 33 of 200 seats in the Connecticut General Assembly at best. After the War of 1812 (which saw the Hartford Convention and the blue lantern affair in the state), however, Federalist power began to wane. The Federalists were closely aligned with the Congregational church, which was still the established church of Connecticut (Connecticut was one of the last States to disestablish its state church; most States had done so by the 1790s, although the Congregational church effectively remained established in New Hampshire until 1819 and in Massachusetts until 1833). All residents of the state had to pay a tithe, which irritated members of other denominations, especially the Episcopalians. Episcopalians in Connecticut were lately wealthy and at odds with the Federalists and pre-Federalists dating back to discrimination that took place before the American Revolution. However, they avoided joining the Democratic-Republicans, partly due to the party being too radical for some of them, and partly because leading Episcopalians strongly supported the Federalists: the first Episcopalian to be appointed to the state upper house was William Samuel Johnson, who later became the head of the Committee of Style that wrote the U.S. Constitution. Among other irritations, a group of Episcopalians had put up bonds for a state bank in 1814 in order to fund an Episcopal college in Cheshire to rival Congregationalist Yale; the Phoenix Bank in Hartford received state funds for Yale College but the Assembly gave nothing to the Episcopal "Bishop's Fund" that was raising money for an Episcopal college and refused the college a charter. This was the immediate impetus that led to the creation of the Toleration Party.

== Foundation of the Toleration Party ==
The Toleration Party was established at a state convention held at New Haven on February 21, 1816. The party was formed by an alliance of the more conservative Episcopalians with the Democratic-Republicans, along with a number of former Federalists and other religious dissenters, specifically Baptists, Methodists, Unitarians, and Universalists. Pierpont Edwards played a large part in the party's creation, and the party nominated Oliver Wolcott Jr. (who formerly was a Federalist), for governor and Judge Jonathan Ingersoll (earlier, a Democratic-Republican) for lieutenant-governor. Wolcott was a Congregationalist, but Ingersoll, a well-respected Judge, was a Warden of the Episcopal Trinity Church on the Green in New Haven.

== Electoral Success ==
In the 1817 elections, the Toleration Party swept control of the General Assembly, with Wolcott and Ingersoll winning election to their executive branch positions, though only by 600 votes. This gave them the political capital to call a convention to draft a new state constitution. But Federalists were still strong and it was clear that a two-thirds majority could not be raised to pass a new constitution. Governor Wolcott appointed the Rev. Harry Croswell, of Trinity Episcopal Church on the Green, New Haven, to deliver the Annual Anniversary Sermon on May 14, 1818. The notorious Croswell, a political opponent of President Jefferson and a former Federalist, had renounced politics for religion. His sermon, strongly advocating the strict separation of church and state, was a success: shortly afterwards, the General Assembly voted 81-80 to allow ratification by a simple majority vote. Croswell's sermon was reprinted in four editions.

The most fateful vote in the General Assembly was that whatever constitution was proposed need be ratified by only a majority of the voters. The vote on this point was 81 to 80, with the dissenters favoring anywhere from 60 to 80 percent affirmative vote of the voters or towns. If any of the dissenters' proposals had carried, the constitution, which passed by a vote of 13,918 to 12,364, would have failed.

At the Connecticut Constitutional Convention in October, 111 of the 201 convention delegates belonged to the Toleration Party. The resulting Constitution of 1818 generally adhered to the Tolerationist platform, especially their two major issues: increasing the electorate and the democratic nature of the government and disestablishing the Congregational Church. The party was eventually ratified by a small majority of voters in the state: it would not have passed had the simple majority rule not been passed in May by one vote. The Tolerationist constitution was used in Connecticut until 1965. In the end, "The separation of church and state, and the overthrow of the last theocracy in America would be accomplished by a former printer's devil, scandalmonger, and twice-convicted felon, the Rev. Harry Croswell."

== Merger with the Democratic Party ==
The Tolerationist Party, although generally independent of the national Democratic-Republican Party, was allied to them. Wolcott was the only governor elected by the ticket; he was in office until 1827, and his successor, Gideon Tomlinson, was nominated by the Democratic-Republican Party itself. By the end of the 1820s the Tolerationists had developed into the Jacksonian branch of the Connecticut Democratic Party, while the Connecticut Federalists and more orthodox Democratic-Republicans had become the state Whig Party.

== Sources ==
- Elliot, Ralph Gregory. 350 Years of Connecticut Government, United States Constitution Bicentennial Commission of Connecticut, 1991.
- Green, Maria Louise. The development of religious liberty in Connecticut, Houghton, Mifflin, 1905
- Horton, Wesley. The Connecticut state constitution: a reference guide. Greenwood Publishing Group, 1993.
- Olsen, Neil C. The End of Theocracy in America: The Distinguishing Line of Harry Croswell's Election Sermon, "including a transcription of A Sermon Preached at the Anniversary Election, Hartford, May 14, 1818 by the Rev. Harry Croswell, A.M., Rector of Trinity Church, New Haven." Nonagram Publications, ISBN 978-1478365464, 2013.
- Purcell, Richard J. Connecticut in Transition: 1775-1818, Wesleyan University Press, Middletown, Connecticut, 1963.
