= List of elections in 1824 =

The following elections occurred in the year 1824.

== Europe ==
- 1824 French legislative election

== North America ==
=== United States ===
- 1824 United States elections
- 1824 United States presidential election

==== United States Senate ====
- 1824 and 1825 United States Senate elections
- 1824–25 United States Senate election in Pennsylvania

==== United States House of Representatives ====
- 1824 and 1825 United States House of Representatives elections
- 1824 United States House of Representatives election in New Jersey
- 1824 United States House of Representatives elections in New York
- 1824 United States House of Representatives elections in Vermont
- 1824 Georgia's at-large congressional district special election
- 1824 Indiana's 1st congressional district special election
- 1824 Massachusetts's 10th congressional district special election
- 1824 Pennsylvania's 8th congressional district special election
- 1824 Pennsylvania's 13th congressional district special election
- 1824 Vermont's at-large congressional district special election
- 1824 Virginia's 13th congressional district special election

==== United States lieutenant gubernatorial ====
- 1824 Connecticut lieutenant gubernatorial election
- 1824 Missouri lieutenant gubernatorial election

==== United States gubernatorial ====
- 1824 Connecticut gubernatorial election
- 1824 Kentucky gubernatorial election
- 1824 Louisiana gubernatorial election
- 1824 Maine gubernatorial election
- 1824 Maryland gubernatorial election
- 1824 Massachusetts gubernatorial election
- 1824 Missouri gubernatorial election
- 1824 New Hampshire gubernatorial election
- 1824 New Jersey gubernatorial election
- 1824 New York gubernatorial election
- 1824 North Carolina gubernatorial election
- 1824 Ohio gubernatorial election
- 1824 Rhode Island gubernatorial election
- 1824 Vermont gubernatorial election
- 1824 Virginia gubernatorial election

==== United States mayoral elections ====
- 1824 Boston mayoral election

== See also ==
- Category:1824 elections
