= List of elections in 1828 =

The following elections occurred in the year 1828.

== North America ==
=== United States ===
- 1828 United States elections
- 1828 United States presidential election

==== United States Senate ====
- 1828 and 1829 United States Senate elections

==== United States House of Representatives ====
- 1828 and 1829 United States House of Representatives elections
- 1828 Arkansas Territory's at-large congressional district special election
- 1828 Kentucky's 2nd congressional district special election
- 1828 Mississippi's at-large congressional district special election
- 1828 New Jersey's at-large congressional district special election
- 1828 Ohio's 6th congressional district special election
- 1828 United States House of Representatives elections in Pennsylvania

==== United States lieutenant gubernatorial ====
- 1828 Connecticut lieutenant gubernatorial election
- 1828 Missouri lieutenant gubernatorial election

==== United States gubernatorial ====
- 1828 Connecticut gubernatorial election
- 1828 Indiana gubernatorial election
- 1828 Kentucky gubernatorial election
- 1828 Louisiana gubernatorial election
- 1828 Maine gubernatorial election
- 1828 Maryland gubernatorial election
- 1828 Massachusetts gubernatorial election
- 1828 Missouri gubernatorial election
- 1828 New Hampshire gubernatorial election
- 1828 New Jersey gubernatorial election
- 1828 New York gubernatorial election
- 1828 North Carolina gubernatorial election
- 1828 Ohio gubernatorial election
- 1828 Rhode Island gubernatorial election
- 1828 South Carolina gubernatorial election
- 1828 Vermont gubernatorial election
- 1828 Virginia gubernatorial election

==== United States mayoral elections ====
- 1828 Boston mayoral election

== See also ==
- Category:1828 elections
