= John Miller (Missouri politician) =

American politician (1781–1946)

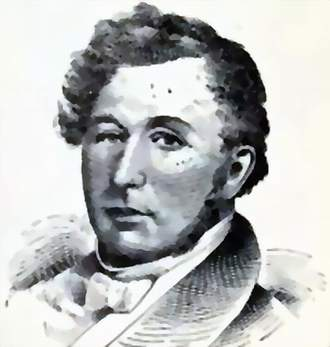

Member of the U.S. House of Representatives from Missouri's at-large district
- In office March 4, 1837 – March 3, 1843
- Preceded by: William Henry Ashley
- Succeeded by: James B. Bowlin

4th Governor of Missouri
- In office January 20, 1826 – November 19, 1832
- Lieutenant: Daniel Dunklin
- Preceded by: Abraham J. Williams
- Succeeded by: Daniel Dunklin

Personal details
- Born: John Miller; November 25, 1781 Martinsburg, Virginia (now Martinsburg, West Virginia)
- Died: March 18, 1846 (aged 64) Florissant, Missouri, U.S.
- Resting place: Bellefontaine Cemetery
- Party: Democratic

John Miller (November 25, 1781 – March 18, 1846) was an American publisher, War of 1812 veteran, and politician from Missouri. A Democrat, Miller was the fourth governor of Missouri (1826 to 1832) before serving three terms in the United States House of Representatives from 1837 to 1843.

== Early life ==
John Miller was born November 25, 1781, near Martinsburg, Virginia (now West Virginia). Little is known of his youth or family history. In 1803 Miller moved to Ohio and began a career in newspapers, serving as publisher of the Western Herald. Miller would later sell his interest in the newspaper to James Wilson, grandfather of U.S. President Woodrow Wilson. Miller was also involved in early Ohio politics through his newspaper and active in the state militia. He was able to use his political influence to be appointed a brigadier general of the Ohio militia.

=== War of 1812 ===
In March 1812, with the threat of war with Great Britain looming, John Miller joined the regular U.S. Army. His rank reduced to lieutenant colonel, Miller was at first assigned to the 17th Infantry Regiment. Then in July 1812 he was promoted to full colonel and transferred to command the 19th Infantry.

As commander of the 19th Colonel Miller distinguished himself in one of the bigger battles on the western frontier during the war, the siege of Fort Meigs. With the British and their Native American allies laying siege to the fort, General (and future U.S. president) William Henry Harrison ordered units from the fort to attack the British gun positions on the south bank of the Miami River. On May 13, 1813, Colonel Miller led 350 regulars and volunteers in capturing the gun battery and took 41 prisoners. However, British troops and Native American warriors under Captain Richard Bullock, counterattacked and drove Miller's detachment back into the fort with heavy casualties. Miller's actions did however distract the besiegers long enough to let American relief forces reach the fort to reinforce the garrison.

The rest of the war passed relatively uneventful for Miller save for a few small skirmishes with Native Americans. During the last months of the war he was in charge of the entire northern frontier. John Miller remained in the U.S. Army after the war's end, and was assigned to Fort Bellefontaine in the Missouri Territory. In summer, 1815 he commanded the Army troops providing security for the large meeting of Native Americans and U.S. officials as they negotiated the Treaties of Portage des Sioux. Miller served another three years after the event, resigning his commission in 1818.

== Political career ==
Using his political connections, John Miller was able to secure an appointment as Registrar of the Howard County United States General Land Office in Franklin, Missouri in 1818. At the time Franklin was a booming river town and the epicenter of Missouri politics. Miller held the Registrar's position until 1825, becoming friends with a group of men who would eventually be known as the "Central Clique" and dominate Missouri Democratic politics through the 1840s. Originally a Democratic-Republican, Miller and friends became staunch Jacksonian Democrats led by Senator Thomas Hart Benton.

=== As governor ===
Missouri endured its first governmental crisis in August 1825 when Governor Frederick Bates died in office. Under the state Constitution, Lieutenant Governor, Benjamin H. Reeves would have finished out Bates' term. However, the previous month, July 1825, Reeves had resigned to take a post with the U.S. government. The governorship then fell temporarily to Senate President Pro Tempore Abraham J. Williams until a special election could be held on December 8, 1825. In that special election John Miller edged out Judge David Todd, William C. Carr, and Rufus Easton with 2,380 of the 4,933 votes cast.

Governor Miller was a strong supporter of moving the state capitol from St. Charles to Jefferson City, Missouri. He also advocated establishing a state prison in the town, to further cement its role as the permanent seat of state government. In 1826 Governor Miller was asked to draw on his previous military experience and help locate a replacement for Fort Bellefontaine. After several days of searching the banks of the Mississippi River, Miller, General Edmund P. Gaines (Commander of the Western Department of the Army), Brig. General Henry Atkinson (commanding officer of the sixth infantry regiment), and explorer William Clark selected a site near the city of "Vide Poche" or Carondelet, ten miles (16 km) south of St. Louis. At first named Cantonment Miller in honor of the Governor, the name was changed in October 1826 to Jefferson Barracks.

John Miller ran for a second term as governor in 1828 and ran unopposed. He would be the only Missouri governor to serve consecutive terms until Warren E. Hearnes in the 1960s. During his second term Miller continued to espouse Jeffersonian principles of limited government. However, he did urge the state general assembly to provide support for public education through use of funds generated by land sales. This would help lead to the establishment of the University of Missouri a decade later in 1839. Troubles with Native Americans marked Miller's second term in office as well. In July 1829 Chief Big Neck led a large group of Iowa Indians into their former hunting grounds in northern Missouri near present-day Kirksville. A minor clash with settlers soon occurred and fears of all-out war swept the frontier. In response Governor Miller sent 2,000 state militia and a dozen companies of U.S. Army troops to Chariton county. Four Missouri militia and several Native Americans were killed in a skirmish at Battle Creek in present-day Schuyler County. Chief Big Neck and many of his party were captured and put on trial in 1830, putting an end to the "Big Neck War". With the outbreak of the Blackhawk War in 1832 fears of attack once again caused Miller to call out the militia, but Missouri remained out of the limited fighting in that war. The Santa Fe Trail was proving to be lucrative, if sometimes dangerous, for Missouri merchants in the late 1820s and early 1830s as well. At Miller's urging, the General Assembly petitioned the federal government to provide U.S. Army escorts to wagon trains as protection from Native Americans and bandits.

In his final term Governor Miller recommended that a state bank be established, backed by the good faith and credit of the government. This was in keeping with his belief in a hard money policy prevalent among Jacksonian Democrats and strong dislike of the Second Bank of the United States. Governor Miller proved to be an adept and frugal manager of the people's money. By the time he left office in 1832 the state's debt had been reduced to just $37,000.

=== In Congress ===
After his second term expired in November 1832 John Miller returned to Howard County, where he had a substantial home and several business interests. He also kept his hand in politics by writing—and sometimes ghostwriting for others—newspaper editorials on issues facing the state and nation. In 1836 he was elected to the first of three consecutive terms in the United States House of Representatives. Miller seldom, if ever, "made waves" in his six years in Congress, preferring to be a good "party man" and supporting the Democratic policies. As far as known he never proposed new or special legislation. Dismayed by the increasing acrimony in national politics brought on by sectional hostilities, Miller chose not to seek a fourth congressional term in 1842.

=== Retirement and death ===
A lifelong bachelor and having no children of his own, Congressman Miller retired to the home of his nephew in Florissant, Missouri. He died there on March 18, 1846, at age 64. First placed in the private vault of wealthy friend John O'Fallon on the O'Fallon estate, Miller was later reinterred at Bellefontaine Cemetery in St. Louis, Missouri.

== Legacy ==
He is the namesake of Miller County, Missouri.

Party political offices
First	Democratic nominee for Governor of Missouri; 1825, 1828	Succeeded by Daniel Dunklin
Political offices
Preceded by Abraham J. Williams	Governor of Missouri; 1826–1832	Succeeded by Daniel Dunklin
U.S. House of Representatives
Preceded by William Henry Ashley	Member of the U.S. House of Representatives from Missouri's at-large congressional district 1837–1843	Succeeded by James B. Bowlin
