= 1825 Missouri gubernatorial special election =

- December 8, 1825
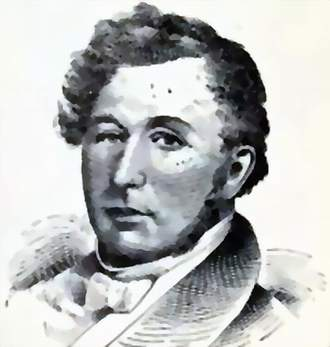

Nominee	John Miller	William Carr	David Todd
Party	Democratic	National Republican	National Republican
Popular vote	2,793	1,610	1,291
Percentage	48.38%	27.89%	22.36%
- County results Miller: 40–50% 50–60% 60–70% 70–80% >90% Carr: 40–50% 50–60% 70–80% 80–90% Todd: 40–50% 50–60% 60–70% No Votes
Governor before election
Abraham J. Williams
Democratic-Republican
Elected Governor
John Miller
Democratic

The 1825 Missouri gubernatorial special election was held on December 8, 1825, to determine who would fill the remainder of the term of Frederick Bates who had died on August 4, 1825. Governor Abraham J. Williams (who succeeded Bates) did not stand for election and John Miller was elected over William Carr, David Todd, and Missouri Attorney General Rufus Easton.

== Results ==
1825 gubernatorial special election, Missouri
Party	Candidate	Votes	%	±%
Democratic	John Miller	2,793	48.38	+48.38
National Republican	William Carr	1,610	27.89	
National Republican	David Todd	1,291	22.36	
Democratic-Republican	Rufus Easton	79	1.37	
Majority		1,183	20.49	+6.09
Turnout		5,773		
Democratic gain from Democratic-Republican		Swing		
