= 1824 Missouri lieutenant gubernatorial election =

- August 2, 1824
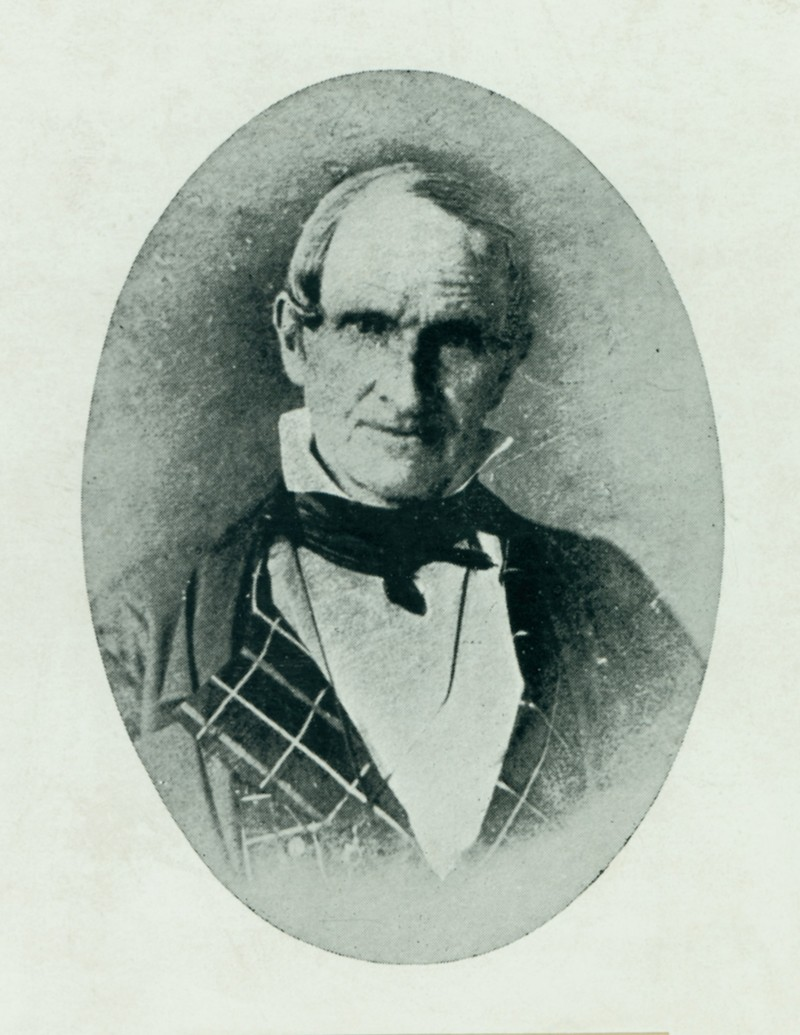
Nominee	Benjamin Harrison Reeves
Party	Democratic-Republican
Popular vote	Unknown
Percentage	100.00%
Lieutenant Governor before election
William H. Ashley
Democratic-Republican
Elected Lieutenant Governor
Benjamin Harrison Reeves
Democratic-Republican

The 1824 Missouri lieutenant gubernatorial election was held on August 2, 1824, in order to elect the lieutenant governor of Missouri. Democratic-Republican nominee Benjamin Harrison Reeves won the election as he ran unopposed. The exact results of the election are unknown.

== General election ==
On election day, August 2, 1824, Democratic-Republican nominee Benjamin Harrison Reeves won the election as he ran unopposed, thereby retaining Democratic-Republican control over the office of lieutenant governor. Reeves was sworn in as the 2nd lieutenant governor of Missouri on November 15, 1824.

=== Results ===
Missouri lieutenant gubernatorial election, 1824
Party	Candidate	Votes	%
Democratic-Republican	Benjamin Harrison Reeves	Unknown	100.00
Total votes		Unknown	100.00
Democratic-Republican hold			

== See also ==
- 1824 Missouri gubernatorial election
