= Jacob Holgate =

American politician

14th Speaker of the Pennsylvania House of Representatives
- In office 1815–1832
- Preceded by: John St. Clair
- Succeeded by: Rees Hill

Personal details
- Born: June 10, 1767 Chestnut Hill, Pennsylvania
- Died: September 18, 1832 (aged 65)
- Party: Democratic Republican

Jacob Holgate (June 10, 1767 – September 18, 1832) was a businessman, member of the Pennsylvania House of Representatives, and served as speaker of the House in 1815.

== Early life ==
Holgate was born in Chestnut Hill, Pennsylvania.

== Political activities ==
Holgate was a member of the Democratic Republican party.

=== 1800s ===
Holgate was nominated in 1800 for a seat in the State Assembly to fill the seat vacated by the deceased Thomas Miflin.

He was elected to the Pennsylvania House of Representatives in 1801 from Philadelphia County. (Other Democratic Republicans elected along with him from Philadelphia County included William Penrose, Elijah Gordon, John Goodman, James Engle, and George Ingles.) There were no opposition candidates from the Federalist Party. In 1802, he received 2,544 votes in his election to the seat. In 1806, he received 1,652 votes in his election to the seat.

=== 1810s ===
In 1810, Holgate was elected by the Pennsylvania State Legislature as a director of the Philadelphia National Bank.

Holgate served on the Pennsylvania state committee for the re-election of James Madison in 1812.

In December, 1814, Holgate was elected Speaker of the Pennsylvania House of Representatives.

During his time in the Pennsylvania House of Representatives, Holgate offered resolutions (which were passed), stating that Congress had no right to charter banks within the states, suggesting a slippery slope of Congress establishing other types of companies if it had such power.

=== 1820s ===
Holgate was active on a committee to support the re-election of President James Monroe in 1820.

He supported Andrew Jackson for President. He was talked about as a possible candidate for governor of Pennsylvania but never received his party's nomination.

At the 1824 (held on March 4) Pennsylvania Democrat Convention, Holgate was chosen as chairman and later president. While it was already accepted that the convention would support Andrew Jackson for President, there was a debate over who would be supported for Vice President. Henry Clay was nominated and received ten votes. However, John C. Calhoun ultimately received more votes. Holgate served as a presidential elector for Andrew Jackson in the Election of 1824 and in the Election of 1828. Jackson won the state of Pennsylvania in both elections.

On March 31, 1824, Holgate was appointed (along with James Clark and Charles Treziyulney) to the board of canal commissioners. They were charged with viewing and exploring routes for a canal from Harrisburg to Pittsburgh. The survey began on May 24 and ended for the year on December 6.

On May 25, 1826, Holgate was chosen as chair of a Philadelphia public meeting in favor of electing Andrew Jackson as the next president. Secretaries included Frederic Sloever and Henry Horn. Future Vice President George M. Dallas gave the preamble and resolutions at this meeting, and then began to criticize the then present administration of John Quincy Adams.

Holgate served as secretary on the Committee of Superintendence and Viligence, for the City and County of Philadelphia in 1826.

=== 1830s ===
He served as a Philadelphia delegate to the Tariff Convention in New York held on October 26, 1831.

== Business activities ==
Holgate began running his father's mill in 1803. When his father died in 1817, Holgate sold the property to William Weaver.

In 1817, Holgate purchased one half interest (the other half going to William Hicks of Germantown) in a distillery and grist mill located in Kingston Township in an area called "Mill's Hollow." The enterprise was run by Hicks until June 17, 1831. Hicks then gave his half to Holgate, whose representatives ran the operation. The terms of the agreement said that 1/4 of the proceeds from the grist mill would go to Hicks, until the death of Holgate and his wife. After Holgate's death in 1832, representatives of his estate ran the mill until either 1836 or 1837. The mill was destroyed by fire.

At the Harrisburg Canal Convention, held on August 5 and 6, 1825, Holgate along with a number of others (Matthew Carey – Philadelphia, John Kennedy – Fayette County, S.D. Ingham – Bucks County, Joseph Patterson – Alleghany County, Philip S. Markley – Montgomery County, Thomas H. Sill – Erie County, John Forster – Dauphin County, and Thomas H. Baird of Washington County) were asked to prepare an address to the people of Pennsylvania on the subject of internal improvements. The address was given on August 22, 1825.

On June 28, 1827, Holgate chaired a meeting in Germantown consisting of manufacturers, farmers, and mechanics. Samuel Hervey and Redwood Fisher were secretaries of the meeting.

== Other activities ==
Jacob Holgate, along with Josiah Squires, provided land in Luzerne for the "island school house" which was the first school house in the town (then known as Hartseph).

== See also ==
- Speaker of the Pennsylvania House of Representatives
