= Abraham Bradley Jr. =

Assistant U.S. Postmaster General, lawyer and judge

- Born: February 22, 1767; Litchfield, Connecticut
- Died: May 7, 1838 (aged 71); Washington, D.C.
- Other name: Abraham Bradley IV
- Education: Litchfield Law School
- Occupation: Assistant Postmaster General
- Years active: 1793–1829
- Employer: Post Office Department
- Spouse: Hannah Smith
- Children: Joseph Habersham Bradley, son
- Relatives: Phineas Bradley, brother

Signature
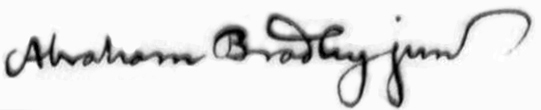

Abraham Bradley Jr. (February 22, 1767 – May 7, 1838) was an American lawyer, judge, and cartographer who was an assistant postmaster general for 30 years during the earliest history of the United States Post Office Department.

The continuity brought by Bradley's long employment during the tenure of five United States postmasters generals helped establish the budding postal service as a reliable provider. While not trained as an artist or cartographer, Bradley created innovative and detailed postal route maps that improved the office's efficiency. In 1796, Bradley drew one of the first comprehensive maps of the United States; it "represented the first clear cartographic break in European-dominated map making and introduced a new, more distinctly American style of cartography to the United States." In 1800, Bradley oversaw the move of the federal government's post office from Philadelphia, Pennsylvania, to the new capital at Washington, D.C., briefly hosting the national post office in his own home.

== Early life ==
Born in Litchfield, Connecticut, to the colonial family established by Guilford, Connecticut, pioneer Stephen Bradley, Abraham was the fourth consecutive scion to bear his name. His father, Abraham, was a Yale College graduate who listed his various employments as "a surveyor of land, master of a vessel, selectman, town treasurer, representative in the state legislature, justice of the peace, a zealous Whig, captain in the American Revolutionary War, judge of the court, town clerk, and something of a scribbler in prose and verse." The son, Abraham Bradley, showed promise as a student and graduated from the celebrated law school run by Litchfield attorney Tapping Reeve.

Tapping Reeve's Law School

== Postal career ==
Bradley moved to the Wyoming Valley of frontier Pennsylvania in 1788 and established himself in private law practice. While briefly serving as a county judge in Wilkes-Barre, he made the acquaintance of local judge Timothy Pickering. Bradley accompanied him as a personal clerk when Pickering was appointed postmaster general by President George Washington and moved to Philadelphia in 1791. Bradley was described by a contemporary as "an unassuming man, modest and retiring almost to diffidence, yet a lawyer of competent learning, with a clear and discriminating mind, and an industry that knew no relaxation when there was a duty to perform..."

=== Philadelphia ===
As one of his many responsibilities as clerk to the postmaster general, Bradley began to compile information for a complete postal service map, including routes, stations, and distances between each. Handicapped by his lack of training in the fields of topography and cartography, Bradley drew upon earlier maps by Robert Erskine and Thomas Hutchins. When Postmaster General Pickering was succeeded by Joseph Habersham in 1795, Bradley's postal route maps and voluminous knowledge of the department made him an irreplaceable figure.

Bradley's first postal road map of 1796

==== Map of 1796 ====
In September 1796, Bradley published the first combined map of the post office stations, routes, and distances between. The map included a remarkable and innovative table that indicated times and days of the week to expect mail at various important postal coach stops along the primary eastern route. By this chart it could be determined that a letter posted in northeasternmost station at Brewers station somewhere in the present day Town of Robbinston, Washington County, Maine, could be expected to reach St. Marys, Georgia, in six weeks plus four days: 46 days of travel. Bradley spent much of his career improving, expanding, and refining U.S. postal maps during the rapid westward expansion of America in the early 19th century. Appointed assistant postmaster general by Habersham in 1799, he would serve in the office until 1828.

=== Washington, D.C. ===
In 1800, the seat of U.S. government was transferred from urban Philadelphia to the newly surveyed, mostly rural District of Columbia. Under Habersham, Bradley was assigned the task of moving the General Post Office Department files and furniture to a location in the nation's new capital. Bradley acquired a three-story house at the northeast corner of 9th and E streets NW, installed his family in the top floor, Habersham's and his own offices on the second story, and the clerks' offices on the ground level.

We have not been able to open the office and to accommodate business until to-day. I left Philadelphia Wednesday the 27th of May and arrived here on the evening of the 29th. The President [Adams] left Philadelphia the 26th and arrived at Georgetown the first of June. The situation of the city is extremely pleasant and it will probably become the greatest city in America ...

— Bradley to Joseph Habersham, June 11, 1800

Bradley found property rents and prices in Washington, D.C., unnecessarily high, roughly 500 houses scattered over a ten-square-mile tract, but believed the scale of the enterprise guaranteed the new capital's success. Bradley invited his brother, Wilkes-Barre physician Phineas Bradley, to join him in bringing his family to the budding village, soon to be a thriving seat of government; Phineas became one of Washington's first town councilmen. In 1802, Bradley and his wife Hannah had a son they would name Joseph Habersham Bradley after the Georgia postmaster and family friend.

Bradley's U.S. postal route map of 1804

==== Map of 1804 ====
As a Federalist, Bradley desired the re-election of John Adams in 1800. But when the new president, Thomas Jefferson, appointed Gideon Granger to the office of postmaster general, Granger kept the sober and reliable Bradley as his assistant. By the time of the purchase of Louisiana in 1803, Bradley's 1796 map was vastly outdated, so he prepared a new map with the help of British cartographer Aaron Arrowsmith.

Produced in color in 1804, the new map reflected the enormous changes the service and the country had undergone in eight years. The Ohio Country and the Louisiana and Mississippi territories were well marked, and the postal routes of the new states of Kentucky and Tennessee fully developed. Like the original version, copies of this new map were printed and distributed to be displayed in every large post office in the United States.

Bradley published a revision in 1810, but the War of 1812 made reliable mail delivery a much more hazardous enterprise. Return J. Meigs Jr., former governor of Ohio, was appointed to replace the retiring Granger in March 1814; again the incoming postmaster general kept the first assistant. As the wartime threat to Washington, D.C., grew, Bradley began looking for a farm away from the city where he and his wife could raise their children; in 1814, Bradley acquired a 218-acre (0.88 km^{2}) farm in Montgomery County, Maryland, near the tiny community of Chevy Chase. During the burning of Washington in 1814, many of the postal records and a few public officials were transferred for safety to the Bradley farmhouse, ten miles (16 km) north of the White House.

Bradley's 1825 postal route map

==== Map of 1825 ====
In 1823, Meigs was in ill health, and was replaced by John McLean, also from Ohio. McLean, who was later to become an associate justice of the United States Supreme Court, proved an industrious and creative postmaster general. McLean, like his predecessors, kept Bradley as his chief assistant. Bradley and his brother Dr. Phineas Bradley managed an office of 30 postal clerks and served several thousand local post offices.

Bradley's 1825 edition of his map included postal routes in the newly acquired states of Arkansas, Illinois, and Missouri, while still providing accurate cartographic information on areas such as Michigan, Minnesota, and Wisconsin territories. The completed map measured roughly four feet high and five feet wide, and included an inset map depicting the known extent of the North American continent.

In the election of 1828, Bradley and his brother supported the incumbent president, John Quincy Adams, but when Andrew Jackson was elected instead, Jackson partisans called for Bradley's ouster. Jackson seems to have viewed the Bradley brothers as being corrupted by their high government salaries and their unique positions to decide the winners of lucrative mail contracts. First Abraham, then brother Phineas were removed from their positions in 1829, months after Jackson's inauguration.

== Legacy ==
After his removal, Bradley made no attempt to defend himself from partisan attack, but he did make several public communications pointing out what were in his view defective actions by the new administration in regards to postal service. Bradley became for a time secretary of the Franklin Insurance Company.

When Abraham Bradley died in his home in Washington, D.C., May 7, 1838, he left eight children, including lawyer Joseph H. Bradley, best known for his successful defense of John Surratt, accused of attempting to assassinate Abraham Lincoln. The younger Bradley inherited the Chevy Chase farm and himself had a namesake son, also a Washington, D.C., attorney who assisted the Surratt defense team.

Bradley's service to the country as assistant postmaster general is regarded as influential. Bradley's postal routes and schedules, enforced over 30 years, gave the Post Office Department a rapid and reliable engine for delivering information across vast distances, instilling in citizens the importance of the connectedness they shared with their distant neighbors. The numerous maps Bradley published, though later discarded and redrawn by the new Jackson administration, created in their time a sense of the immensity of American territory.

His 9.36-acre farm, which sat along present-day Connecticut Avenue, was leased in 1894 by Francis Newlands, a U.S. representative and land developer who had been seeking a parcel for a country club that might lure buyers to his planned suburb of Chevy Chase, Maryland. The land was immediately sublet by Newlands' Chevy Chase Land Company to the founders of the Chevy Chase Club, which purchased the land outright for $22,500 ($871,000 today) on May 12, 1897, and operates there to this day.
