= Rufus Easton =

American attorney, politician, and postmaster

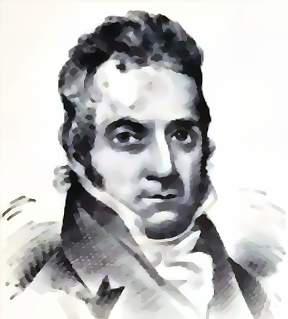

Attorney General of Missouri
- In office 1821–1826
- Governor: Alexander McNair; Frederick Bates; Abraham J. Williams
- Preceded by: Edward Bates
- Succeeded by: Robert William Wells

Delegate to the U.S. House of Representatives from the Missouri Territory's at-large district
- In office September 17, 1814 – August 5, 1816
- Preceded by: Edward Hempstead
- Succeeded by: John Scott

Personal details
- Born: May 4, 1774 Washington, Connecticut, British America
- Died: July 5, 1834 (aged 60) St. Charles, Missouri, U.S.
- Party: Democratic-Republican
- Spouse: Alby Smith

Rufus Easton (May 4, 1774 – July 5, 1834) was an American attorney, politician, and postmaster. He served as a non-voting delegate to the United States House of Representatives from the Missouri Territory prior to statehood. After statehood he became Missouri's second attorney general. Rufus Easton was the founder of Alton, Illinois, and father of women's education pioneer Mary Easton Sibley.

== Early life ==
Rufus Easton was born on May 4, 1774, in Washington, Litchfield County, Connecticut, to parents Joseph and Mehitable (Baker) Easton. After studying Law under Ephraim Kirby in his native Litchfield County, Easton moved to Rome, New York, and established a law practice. Easton and wife Alby, who he had married in 1799, left New York in 1803 settling briefly in Vincennes, Indiana Territory. In Vincennes he became friends with Edward Hempstead and John Scott, joining them in William Henry Harrison's expedition to set up a territorial government in St. Louis, District of Louisiana in 1804.

== Founding of Alton, Illinois ==
Easton purchased land just east of the Mississippi River in 1815 where he established a town. He named the town in honor of his firstborn son, Alton Rufus Easton. Alton is at the juncture of the Mississippi and Missouri rivers and is near where Lewis and Clark set off for their Voyage of Discovery. Aside from the town name, the Easton family is memorialized in Easton Street and streets named after Easton children, including Alby, Alton, George, Langdon and Henry.

Unfortunately, Easton was not prosperous in Alton and speculation there left him in financial straits for the remainder of his life.

== Government service and politics ==
=== Burr conspiracy ===
Just a year after arriving in St. Louis, Rufus Easton received two federal appointments from President Thomas Jefferson. His reputation for legal work in New York preceding him, Easton was appointed a Territorial Judge for the United States territorial court. Additionally he was appointed the first Postmaster of St. Louis in 1805. It was a time of political intrigue in the western United States and new territories with several prominent men implicated in the Burr Conspiracy. While Easton did exchange correspondence with Aaron Burr during that time period, primarily regarding the actions of James Wilkinson, he strongly denied being a co-conspirator. Burr had become acquainted with Easton a few years previous and helped arrange his appointment as a judge. When Burr visited St. Louis in July, 1805 he met with Easton and revealed to him some details of his plot, asking him to join. Easton refused and broke off all further contact with Burr. Shortly thereafter Easton wrote to President Jefferson informing him of Burr's plot. In retaliation for Easton's repudiation, Wilkinson, a key Burr conspirator, began a campaign to have Easton removed from the court by leveling charges of official misconduct and fraud. Rufus Easton was acquitted and even traveled to Washington, D.C., to meet with Jefferson. It was for naught, as the President removed Easton from his judicial post in February, 1806. Several months later however, Jefferson attempted to set right the removal by appointing Easton as U.S. Attorney for the territory.

Stung by the assault on his honor over the conspiracy and his removal as judge, Rufus Easton seriously considered challenging Aaron Burr to a duel. Fortunately, friend and U.S. Postmaster General Gideon Granger wrote Easton in December, 1806 convincing him not to pursue the matter. Burr of course was experienced in such affairs of honor, having killed Alexander Hamilton in an 1804 duel. This was not the only instance of Easton showing intemperance. While still a territorial judge Easton had ruled favorably on the freedom suit brought on behalf of Marguerite Scypion and her family. Once Easton was removed from the bench, attorney James Donaldson worked on behalf of Missouri slaveholders to get the decision overturned. Further, Easton—who dabbled in land speculation—had clashed with a group of land owners and agents represented by Donaldson and harsh words were exchanged. This culminated in June, 1806 with Easton bursting into a Board of Land Commissioners meeting and beating Donaldson with a cane. The board brought assault charges against Easton and he was jailed for two weeks.

Rufus Easton continued his law practice, land dealings, and postmaster duties for the next several years. In the latter capacity he made history on April 21, 1810, by hand writing the first St. Louis postmark. He was responsible for the construction of the first post office building in St. Louis, very near where the Gateway Arch stands today. Easton would continue to serve as postmaster until January, 1815. While Rufus Easton held a commission of Colonel in the militia, it is believed that he was not an active participant in the War of 1812, his political and business affairs keeping him otherwise occupied. In November, 1812 the first territorial legislature was elected as well as a non-voting delegate to the U.S. Congress. Easton ran for the delegate position but was defeated by Edward Hempstead. He turned his attention to banking the following year, becoming a commissioner of the Bank of St. Louis. Later, in 1818 Easton took over as director of the bank. However, the Panic of 1819 adversely affected the bank and it closed within the year.

=== To Congress ===
Rufus Easton stood for election as the territorial delegate to Congress again in September, 1814 and won. During his term Easton managed to accomplish a considerable amount on behalf of the Missouri territory. Issues on the sale of public lands, the Washington County lead mines, and granting lands to war veterans were all taken up as cause by Easton. He secured funding to establish fourteen additional post offices in the Missouri Territory and earned a place in history as the first Congressional sponsor of federal disaster aid, that to help victims of the New Madrid earthquakes.

In 1816 Easton lost to John Scott by a mere fifteen votes. Rufus Easton contested the election, claiming voter fraud and petitioned the U.S. House of Representatives to overturn the results. An investigative committee ruled in favor of Easton. However, when the matter was put to a vote of the full House the seat was declared vacant and a new election ordered. The special election of 1817 was one of the wildest in Missouri history. Many fistfights were reported, and even some stabbings. Free whiskey provided by Scott and his supporters at polling places provided ample lubrication to all who promised to vote for him. The results seemed preordained, and indeed the delegate seat went to John Scott.

Fed up with politics, at least temporarily, Rufus Easton turned his attention back to his lucrative land dealings and the aforementioned Bank of St. Louis. Many of his land holdings were located around bluffs across the Mississippi River from St. Louis and Easton felt this would be an ideal location for a competing town. After establishing a ferry service to the location the land was surveyed and laid out to create the town of Alton, Illinois—named for Easton's son—in 1817. Streets were named for his sons and daughter - Langdon, George and Easton, and wife Alby.

=== Attorney General ===
Rufus Easton returned to politics in 1821 when he was appointed the second Attorney General for the new state of Missouri by governor Alexander McNair. He replaced his protégé Edward Bates, who had studied law under and boarded with the Easton family. One of the major challenges Easton dealt with as Attorney General was helping guide the state through the gubernatorial succession process following the unexpected death of Missouri's second governor, Frederick Bates, in August, 1825. The Scypion freedom lawsuit once again appeared in the Missouri courts while Easton was Attorney General. This partially due to an 1824 law, encouraged by Easton, that made such suits legal. Easton was also responsible for pushing an amendment that would scuttle a bill that prevented free blacks and mulattoes from living in Missouri.

When his term was up in 1826 Rufus Easton chose not to continue as Attorney General. He semi-retired to his St. Charles, Missouri home, doing occasional legal work and managing his land holdings. After a brief illness Rufus Easton died on July 5, 1834, at his home. He was buried on the grounds of Lindenwood College in St. Charles.

== Legacy and honors ==
- In 1982 the United States Postal Service issued a stamp featuring Rufus Easton.
- Rufus Easton School, a former school in Alton, Illinois was so named in his honor.
- St. Louis, Missouri and Alton, Illinois both had streets named for Rufus Easton. The St. Louis street was later renamed Dr. Martin Luther King Drive.

U.S. House of Representatives
Preceded by Edward Hempstead	Delegate to the U.S. House of Representatives from the Missouri Territory's at-large congressional district 1814–1816	Succeeded by John Scott
Legal offices
Preceded by Edward Bates	Attorney General of Missouri; 1821–1826	Succeeded by Robert William Wells
