= Governor Bates =

Governor Bates may refer to:

- Frederick Bates (politician) (1777–1825), 2nd Governor of Missouri
- John L. Bates (1859–1946), 41st Governor of Massachusetts
