= Charles S. Hempstead =

American mayor (1794–1873)

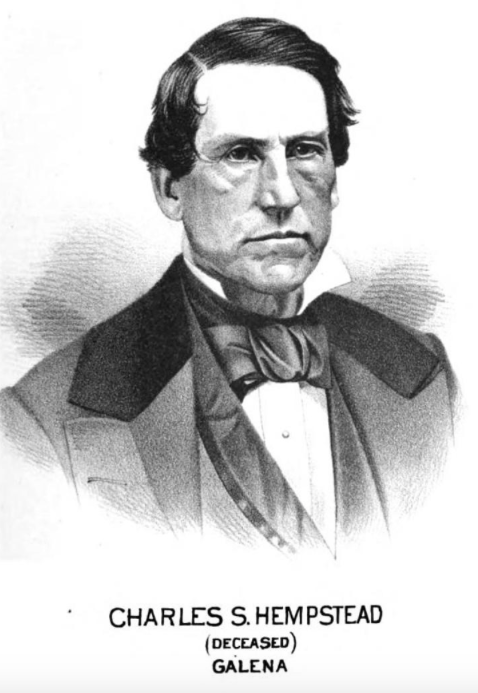
- Portrait, 1878

1st Mayor of Galena
- In office May 24, 1841 – 1845
- Preceded by: seat established
- Succeeded by: Albion T. Crow

Personal details
- Born: September 10, 1794 Hebron, Connecticut, U.S.
- Died: December 10, 1874 Galena, Illinois, U.S.
- Resting place: Greenwood Cemetery, Galena, Illinois
- Party: Republican

Charles Smith Hempstead (September 10, 1794 – December 10, 1874) was a businessman, lawyer, and mayor from the U.S. state of Illinois. He is credited for serving as the first mayor of the city of Galena in Jo Daviess County. He was a promoter of the Galena and Chicago Union Railroad and was the younger brother of Missouri Territory House Representative Edward Hempstead.

== Biography ==
=== Early years ===
Charles was born in Hebron, Connecticut, on September 10, 1794 to American Revolutionary War veteran Stephen Hempstead Sr. and Marry Lewis. In 1809 at the age of 15 he left his school at the New London Academy in Forest, Virginia for St. Louis. After his arrival he would study law for three years under his elder brother Edward Hempstead (b. 1780), until 1812 when Edward was elected as the first Representative for the Missouri Territory's at-large congressional district. He would die in 1817, aged 37, from complications caused by a horse accident; buried on his farm that would later become Bellefontaine Cemetery in 1849.

=== Career ===
Charles would ultimately settle in Galena in May, 1829. We know from the Galena Daily Gazette that he was heavily involved in local politics. He was the Secretary of the Commission for the Second Treaty of Prairie du Chien that same year. Charles would soon travel to both Washington, D.C. as well as Richmond, Virginia. He was a witness of the impeachment of Judge James H. Peck and attended the debate of the "Foot Resolution". Intended to limit the sale of public lands. He would also attend the Virginia Constitutional Convention of 1829–1830 before returning home to Galena. In January, 1834 he married Eliza Barnes and they had two children. In 1838 Charles was appointed by the Illinois General Assembly as a commissioner selling shares for the Mississippi & Rock River Canal Company. By 1840 Charles became an attorney partner and close friend with Harvard Law School graduate Elihu B. Washburne up until Washburne was elected to serve as a congressman for Illinois in 1852. In 1845 Washburne would marry Adele Gratiot, Charles' niece.

On April 26, 1841 Galena was granted its charter. During that same period on May 24, a mayoral election was held by the board of trustees in which three candidates ran: Charles, H. H. Gear, and Daniel Wann. The results showed a turnout of 356 voters, of which Charles received 185, resulting in him becoming Galena's first mayor. He would serve until 1845. He would also briefly serve as an alderman in 1849.

When the American Civil War broke out Charles was given the position of Assistant Paymaster of the Army by President Abraham Lincoln in 1861. He would work under Paymaster-General of the United States Army Timothy Andrews before resigning in 1863. In addition, let it be known that despite Charles support for the Northern Union, he had a mixed view on slavery and may have taken the position solely as a business venture instead of a moral service. Charles' political stance is also unclear. He is believed to have been a Moderate Republican or possibly a War Democrat. Charles is confirmed to have owned three enslaved people during his life. In a letter to his younger brother William Hempstead (b. 1800) in February, 1837 he writes about a man named Tom and a mulatta women named Mary with her son Augustus. All of which were granted their freedom by 1845. Despite never again owning a slave, it is known that some members of Charles' family were strong supporters of African-American enslavement. Such as his nephew Stephen P. Hempstead, who previously served as the 2nd governor of Iowa from 1850―1854.

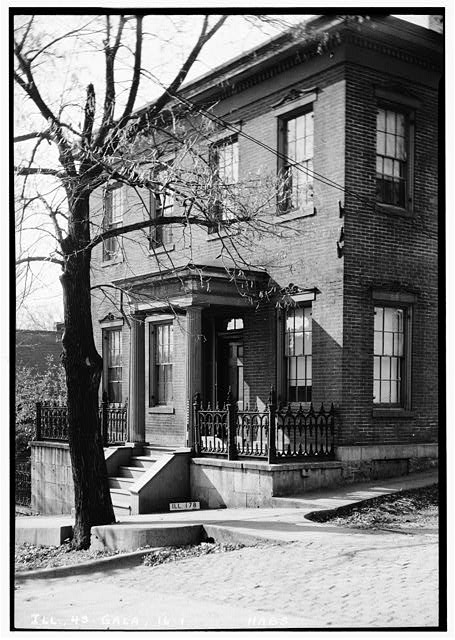
Hempstead House: 1936. Built c. 1846

=== Later years ===
Charles spent the rest of his days in Galena as a prominent lawyer and member of the Early Settler's Association until his death on December 10, 1874 at age 80. His law and business partner Elihu B. Washburne had this to say about his passing in a letter from January 15, 1875. "I have felt it to be fitting that a tribute should be paid to the memory of a man who was a connecting link with the age gone by, and whose career was so interwoven not only with the history of our immediate locality, but with the earlier settlement of the west and northwest."

== Legacy ==
Charles left an everlasting effect in Galena and Jo Daviess County, his original home and office still stands near the city's downtown and the Galena River at 611 South Bench Street. His wife Eliza died on August 21, 1880, at the age of 81. Their two sons would spend most of their lives in Chicago, both were buried in Graceland Cemetery. Charles and Eliza, among other local historical figures, are a prominent part of the Galena Historical Society's annual cemetery walk since 1994. The family were said to have been Presbyterians.
