= 1828 Missouri gubernatorial election =

- August 4, 1828
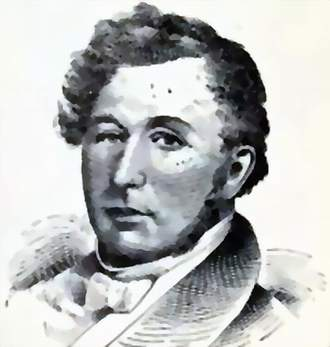
Nominee	John Miller
Party	Democratic
Popular vote	11,958
Percentage	100.00%
Governor before election
John Miller
Democratic
Elected Governor
John Miller
Democratic

The 1828 Missouri gubernatorial election was held on August 4, 1828. Governor John Miller was elected unopposed to a full term as governor (having previously won the 1825 special election to succeed Abraham J. Williams, who succeeded the late Frederick Bates).

== Results ==
1828 gubernatorial election, Missouri
Party	Candidate	Votes	%	±%
Democratic	John Miller (incumbent)	11,958	100.00	+51.62
Majority		11,958	100.00	
Turnout		11,958		
Democratic hold		Swing		
