= Governor McNair =

Governor McNair may refer to:

- Alexander McNair (1775–1826), 1st Governor of Missouri
- Robert Evander McNair (1923–2007), 108th Governor of South Carolina
