= 1828 Missouri lieutenant gubernatorial election =

- August 4, 1828
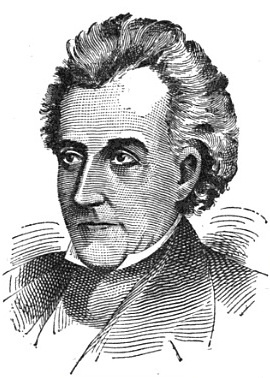
| Nominee | Daniel Dunklin |
| Party | Democratic |
| Popular vote | Unknown |
| Percentage | 100.00% |
Lieutenant Governor before election
Benjamin Harrison Reeves
Democratic-Republican
Elected Lieutenant Governor
Daniel Dunklin
Democratic

The 1828 Missouri lieutenant gubernatorial election was held on August 4, 1828, in order to elect the lieutenant governor of Missouri. Democratic nominee Daniel Dunklin won the election as he ran unopposed. The exact results of the election are unknown.

== General election ==
On election day, August 4, 1828, Democratic nominee Daniel Dunklin won the election as he ran unopposed, thereby gaining Democratic control over the office of lieutenant governor. Dunklin was sworn in as the 3rd lieutenant governor of Missouri on November 14, 1828.

=== Results ===
Missouri lieutenant gubernatorial election, 1828
| Party | Candidate | Votes | % |
|---|---|---|---|
| Democratic | Daniel Dunklin | Unknown | 100.00 |
| Total votes | | Unknown | 100.00 |
| Democratic gain from Democratic-Republican | | | |

== See also ==
- 1828 Missouri gubernatorial election
