= Gideon Tomlinson =

American politician (1780–1854)

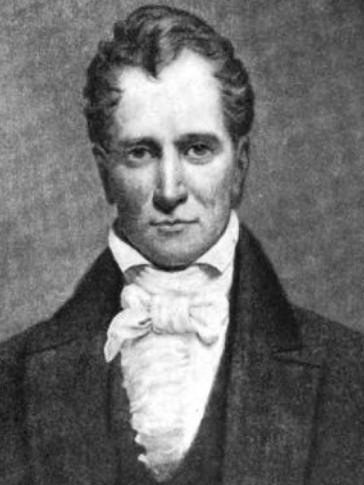

United States Senator from Connecticut
- In office March 4, 1831 – March 3, 1837
- Preceded by: Calvin Willey
- Succeeded by: Perry Smith

25th Governor of Connecticut
- In office May 2, 1827 – March 2, 1831
- Lieutenant: John Samuel Peters
- Preceded by: Oliver Wolcott Jr.
- Succeeded by: John Samuel Peters

Member of the U.S. House of Representatives from Connecticut's at-large district
- In office March 4, 1819 – March 3, 1827
- Preceded by: Thomas Scott Williams
- Succeeded by: David Plant

Personal details
- Born: December 31, 1780 Stratford, Connecticut
- Died: October 8, 1854 (aged 73) Fairfield, Connecticut
- Party: Toleration (1817–1827); Democratic-Republican (1827–1828); National Republican (1828–1834); Whig (1834–1854)
- Spouse(s): Sarah Bradley Tomlinson, Lydia Ann Wells Wright Tomlinson
- Children: Jabez Huntington Tomlinson
- Education: Yale College
- Profession: lawyer, politician

Gideon Tomlinson (December 31, 1780 – October 8, 1854) was a United States senator, United States representative, and the 25th governor for the state of Connecticut.

== Biography ==
Born in Stratford, Tomlinson completed preparatory studies and graduated from Yale College in 1802. He went to Virginia for a year to be a private tutor and to study law. When he returned to Fairfield he continued his studies and was admitted to the bar in 1807. That same year he married Sarah Bradley. He received a Master of Arts, in 1808 from Yale. Their only child, Jabez Huntington Tomlinson, was born in 1818 but died at the young age of 19 in 1838. Mrs. Tomlinson died in 1842. In 1846, Gideon married Mrs. Lydia Ann Wells Wright, widow of William Wright of Bridgeport, Connecticut.

== Career ==
Tomlinson entered politics in 1817, as clerk of the Connecticut House of Representatives, and was reelected again in 1818, when he served as speaker. He was Delegate to the State Constitutional Convention in 1818.

Elected to the Sixteenth and to the three succeeding United States Congresses, Tomlinson served as a Representative from March 4, 1819 to March 3, 1827, and was chairman of the Committee on Commerce (Nineteenth Congress).

Winning the 1827 gubernatorial nomination, Tomlinson was elected Connecticut's eighth governor. He was reelected to the governor's office in 1828, 1829, and 1830. During his tenure, prison reform was accomplished in 1827 with the opening of a more civilized penitentiary. His administration advocated educational improvements and fiscal support to the public school system. On March 2, 1831, Tomlinson resigned from office to accept an appointment to the U.S. Senate.

Tomlinson served in the United States Senate and served from March 4, 1831, to March 3, 1837. There, he served as chairman of the Committee on Pensions (Twenty-third and Twenty-fourth Congresses). In 1837, he left the Senate and became the first President of the newly chartered Housatonic Railroad Company.

He was a trustee of Trinity College, then retired to private life.

== Death and legacy ==
Tomlinson died in Fairfield on October 8, 1854. He is interred at the Old Congregational Cemetery, Stratford, Connecticut. The Tomlinson Bridge (built 1796-98) of Fair Haven (part of New Haven) Connecticut is named after him. The Tomlinson Middle School in Fairfield is named in his honor.

Party political offices
First	National Republican nominee for Governor of Connecticut; 1828, 1829, 1830	Succeeded by John Samuel Peters
Preceded by Samuel A. Foot	Whig nominee for Governor of Connecticut; 1836	Succeeded by William W. Ellsworth
U.S. House of Representatives
Preceded by Thomas Scott Williams	Member of the U.S. House of Representatives from Connecticut's at-large congressional district 1819–1827	Succeeded by David Plant
Political offices
Preceded by Oliver Wolcott Jr.	Governor of Connecticut; 1827–1831	Succeeded by John Samuel Peters
U.S. Senate
Preceded by Calvin Willey	U.S. senator (Class 3) from Connecticut; 1831–1837; Served alongside: Samuel A. Foote, Nathan Smith, John M. Niles	Succeeded by Perry Smith
