= 1829 Connecticut gubernatorial election =

- April 9, 1829
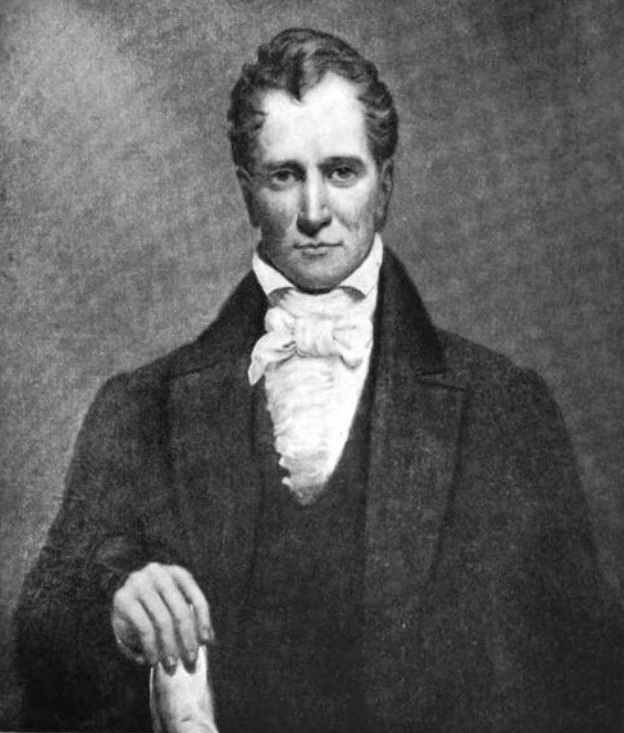
Nominee	Gideon Tomlinson
Party	National Republican
Popular vote	9,612
Percentage	97.52%
- Tomlinson: 50–60% 70–80% 80–90% 90–100% No Vote/Data
Governor before election
Gideon Tomlinson
National Republican
Elected Governor
Gideon Tomlinson
National Republican

The 1829 Connecticut gubernatorial election was held on April 9, 1829. Incumbent governor and National Republican nominee Gideon Tomlinson ran essentially unopposed, winning with 97.52% of the vote amidst a scattering of votes.

== General election ==
=== Candidates ===
Major party candidates

- Gideon Tomlinson, National Republican/Anti-Jacksonian

=== Results ===
1829 Connecticut gubernatorial election
Party	Candidate	Votes	%	±%
National Republican	Gideon Tomlinson (incumbent)	9,612	97.52%	
Other	Others	244	2.48%	
Majority		9,368		
Turnout				
National Republican hold		Swing		
