= Edward Hempstead =

American politician (1780–1817)

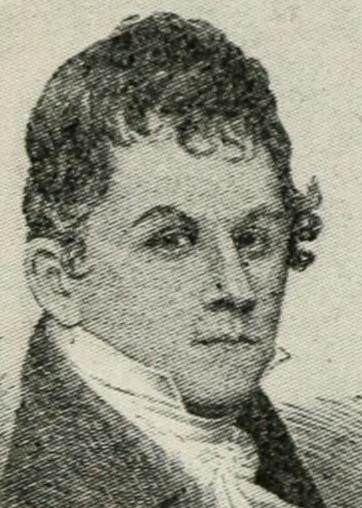

Delegate to the U.S. House of Representatives from the Missouri Territory's at-large district
- In office November 9, 1812 – September 17, 1814
- Preceded by: Constituency established
- Succeeded by: Rufus Easton

Personal details
- Born: June 3, 1780 New London, Connecticut, U.S.
- Died: August 10, 1817 (aged 37) St. Louis, Missouri, U.S.
- Party: Democratic-Republican

Edward Hempstead (June 3, 1780 – August 10, 1817) was an American lawyer, pioneer, and one of the early settlers in the new Louisiana Purchase in 1805. Born in New London, Connecticut, Hempstead was the delegate in the U.S. House for the Missouri Territory from 1812 to 1814. He served as territorial attorney general in Upper Louisiana and in the Missouri Territorial Legislature. He is the older brother of Charles S. Hempstead, the first Mayor of Galena, Illinois.

== Accident ==
Hempstead was raised in Hebron, Connecticut, where he studied under Rev. Amos Basset. He studied law under Sylvester Gilbert when he was eighteen and was licensed in 1801. He practiced for a year in Middlesex County, Connecticut, then two years in Newport, Rhode Island, then was admitted to the bar. He moved to Vincennes, Indiana Territory, in 1804. There, he befriended William Henry Harrison, and assisted with Harrison's government of the District of Louisiana. When Harrison was replaced with James Wilkinson, Hempstead resigned and moved to St. Louis. Hempstead later served with other Governors of the Louisiana and Missouri Territory, including attorney general.

In 1812, the Territory of Missouri (renamed to avoid confusion with Louisiana) became entitled to a delegate to Congress. Hempstead was elected and served a two-year term, declining re-election. He returned to private law practice. Hempstead alter served in the Missouri Territory General Assembly, rising to Speaker of the House. After Edward's election, his younger brother Charles S. Hempstead was forced to move to Illinois.

Hempstead died at his home outside of St. Louis, Missouri on August 10, 1817, six days after an accident in which he was thrown from his horse. He was buried on his farm, on a plot which later became part of Bellefontaine Cemetery. Hempstead's grave is thus among the oldest in the entire cemetery. Hempstead County, Arkansas, is named in his honor.

Hempstead was friends with Thomas Hart Benton. Benton later said that he thought Hempstead would have become Missouri's first senator, had he lived long enough. Benton was with Hempstead when he died and spent the wake with his body. When Benton came home from the wake Benton received a challenge to a duel with Charles Lucas following a dispute over a court case. Benton replied that he would meet Lucas as soon as Hempstead was buried. The two went on to fight two duels, with Benton ultimately killing Lucas.

== See also ==
- List of horse accidents

U.S. House of Representatives
| New constituency | Delegate to the U.S. House of Representatives from the Missouri Territory's at-large congressional district 1812–1814 | Succeeded by Rufus Easton |
