= 1830 Connecticut gubernatorial election =

- April 8, 1830
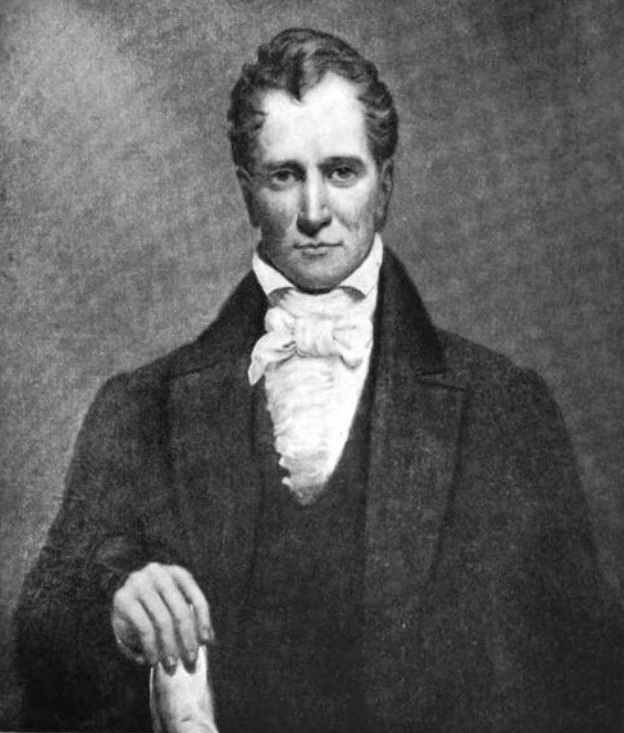
Nominee	Gideon Tomlinson
Party	National Republican
Popular vote	12,988
Percentage	96.19%
- Tomlinson: 30–40% 50–60% 70–80% 80–90% 90–100%
Governor before election
Gideon Tomlinson
National Republican
Elected Governor
Gideon Tomlinson
National Republican

The 1830 Connecticut gubernatorial election was held on April 8, 1830. Incumbent governor and National Republican nominee Gideon Tomlinson ran essentially unopposed, winning with 96.19% of the vote amidst a scattering of votes.

Tomlinson would resign on March 2, 1831, to take his seat in the United States Senate, making John Samuel Peters the acting governor for the remainder of his term until May 4, 1831.

== General election ==
=== Candidates ===
Major party candidates

- Gideon Tomlinson, National Republican

=== Results ===
1830 Connecticut gubernatorial election
Party	Candidate	Votes	%	±%
National Republican	Gideon Tomlinson (incumbent)	12,988	96.19%	
Other	Others	515	3.81%	
Majority		12,473		
Turnout				
National Republican hold		Swing		
