= William H. Ashley =

American politician (1778–1838)

William Henry Ashley

Member of the U.S. House of Representatives from Missouri's at-large district
- In office October 31, 1831 – March 3, 1837
- Preceded by: Spencer D. Pettis
- Succeeded by: John Miller

1st Lieutenant Governor of Missouri
- In office September 18, 1820 – November 15, 1824
- Governor: William Clark; Alexander McNair
- Preceded by: Position created
- Succeeded by: Benjamin Harrison Reeves

Personal details
- Born: c. 1778 Powhatan County, Virginia
- Died: March 26, 1838 (aged 59–60) Cooper County, Missouri, U.S.

Military service
- Branch/service: Missouri Militia
- Battles/wars: War of 1812

William Henry Ashley (c. 1778 – March 26, 1838) was an American miner, land speculator, manufacturer, territorial militia general, politician, frontiersman, fur trader, entrepreneur and hunter. Ashley was best known for being the co-owner with Andrew Henry of the highly-successful Rocky Mountain Fur Incorporated, otherwise known as "Ashley's Hundred" for the famous mountain men working for the firm from 1822 to 1834.

== Early life and ventures ==
Although born a native of Powhatan County, Virginia, William Ashley had already moved to Ste. Genevieve, in what was then a part of the Louisiana Territory, when it was purchased by the United States from France in 1803.

== Career ==
On a portion of this land, later known as Missouri, Ashley made his home for most of his adult life. Ashley moved to St. Louis around 1808 and became a brigadier general in the Missouri Militia during the War of 1812. Before the war, he did some real estate speculation and earned a small fortune manufacturing gunpowder from a lode of saltpeter mined in a cave, near the headwaters of the Current River in Missouri. When Missouri was admitted to the Union, William Henry Ashley was elected its first lieutenant governor, serving from 1820 to 1824 under Governor Alexander McNair. Ashley was a candidate in the 1824 Missouri gubernatorial election, losing to Frederick Bates.

=== Entry into the fur trade ===
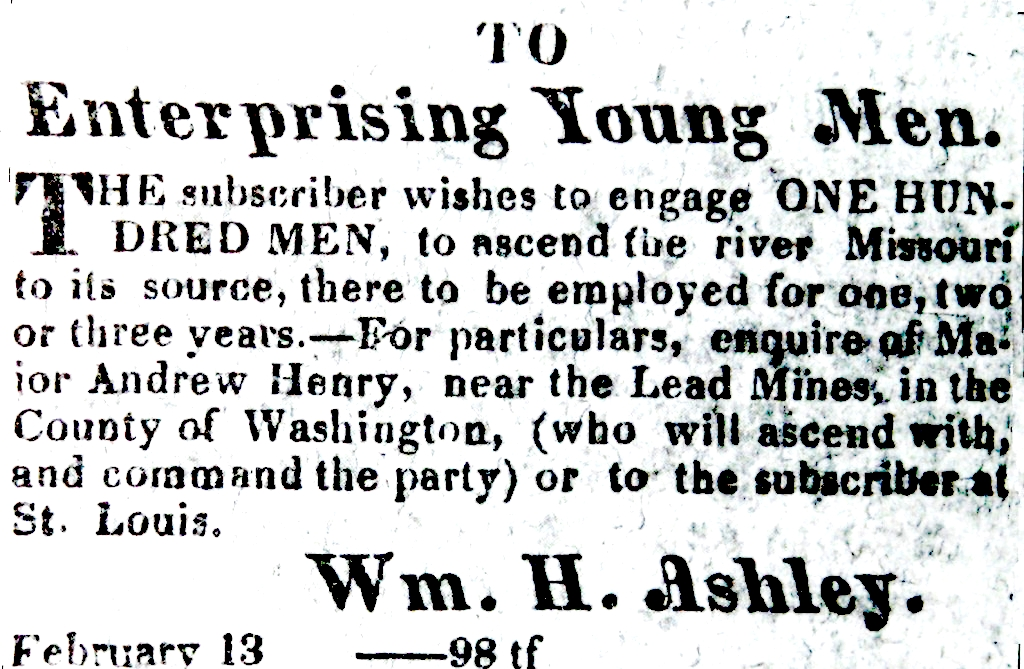
Advertisement from Missouri Gazette, February 13, 1822.

In the early 1820s, William Henry Ashley and Andrew Henry, a bullet maker he met through his gunpowder business, posted famous advertisements in St. Louis newspapers seeking one hundred "enterprising young men . . . to ascend the river Missouri to its source, there to be employed for one, two, or three years" to be hired at $200 a year. The men who responded to this call became known as "Ashley's Hundred." Between 1822 and 1825, Ashley and Henry's Rocky Mountain Fur Company sponsored several large scale fur trapping expeditions in the mountain west.

In 1823 Ashley's Hundred set off on their first expedition to the Rocky Mountains but their ammunition wagon, carrying 800 pounds of powder, blew up. Ashley's Hundred returned on a second trip but on June 2nd were driven back in a fight with the Arikara, in which 13 men were killed and 10 wounded. Ashley was given a rifle made by Samuel Hawken which he took on this expedition, a 42 inch barrel predecessor of the Hawken rifle. Jedediah Smith's party, part of Ashley's Hundred, were officially credited with the American discovery of South Pass in the winter of 1824. Ashley devised the rendezvous system in which trappers, Indians and traders would meet annually in a predetermined location to exchange furs, goods and money. His innovations in the fur trade earned Ashley a great deal of money and recognition, and helped open the western part of the continent to American expansion.

In 1825, he led an expedition into the Salt Lake Valley. South of the Great Salt Lake, he came across Utah Lake, which he named Lake Ashley. He established Fort Ashley on the banks to trade with the Indians. Over the next three years, according to 19th-century historian Frances Fuller Victor, the fort "collected over one-hundred-and-eighty thousand dollars' worth of furs". In late 1824, he explored present-day northern Colorado, ascending the South Platte River to the base of the Front Range, then ascending the Cache la Poudre River to the Laramie Plains and onward to the Green River.

One of the most famous events of all of Ashley's expeditions was the bear attack and subsequent survival of Hugh Glass, a member of his party. The event has inspired two feature-length films, Man in the Wilderness (1971) and The Revenant (2015). Some time after the Arikara fight of June 2, 1823, Glass was hunting for game and disturbed a mother grizzly bear and two cubs. Glass was attacked and badly mauled by the bear. John Fitzgerald and a man described as 'Bridges' stayed with Glass, waiting for him to die, as Ashley and the rest of the party moved on. 'Bridges' may or may not have been the famous frontiersman Jim Bridger. Later, claiming that they were attacked by Arikara, Fitzgerald and Bridges abandoned Glass. They afterward caught up with Ashley and incorrectly reported that Glass had died. Glass miraculously survived on his own, and badly injured, traveled more than 200 miles (320 km) to the nearest American settlement at Fort Kiowa.

=== Later political career ===
In 1826, Ashley sold the fur trading company to a group including Jedediah Smith but continued supplying the company and brokering their furs. Upon the death of Spencer Darwin Pettis in August 1831, he was elected to finish out Pettis's term in the United States House of Representatives. As a member of the Jacksonian Party, Ashley won election to the seat in 1832 and re-election in 1834. In 1836, he declined to run for a fourth term in Congress, instead running unsuccessfully in the 1836 Missouri gubernatorial election. Many attribute his defeat to his increasingly pro-business stance in Congress, which alienated the rural Jacksonians. After the loss, he went back to making money on real estate, but his health declined rapidly.

In 1832, the same year he won a seat in the House of Representatives, William H. Ashley married Elizabeth Moss. The two were married until his death in 1838.

== Death ==
On March 26, 1838, Ashley died of pneumonia at age 59. Ashley was buried atop a Native American burial mound in Lamine Township, Cooper County, Missouri, overlooking the juncture of the Lamine River and the Missouri River.

William H. Ashley is the namesake of the small community of Ashley, Missouri. Also Ashley Falls and Ashley Creek in northeast Utah, and the Ashley National Forest are named for him.

Political offices
Preceded by Position established	Lieutenant Governor of Missouri; 1820–1824	Succeeded by Benjamin Harrison Reeves
U.S. House of Representatives
Preceded by Spencer D. Pettis	Member of the U.S. House of Representatives from Missouri's at-large congressional district 1831–1837	Succeeded by John Miller
