= John Scott (Missouri politician) =

Delegate and a U.S. representative from Missouri (1785–1861)

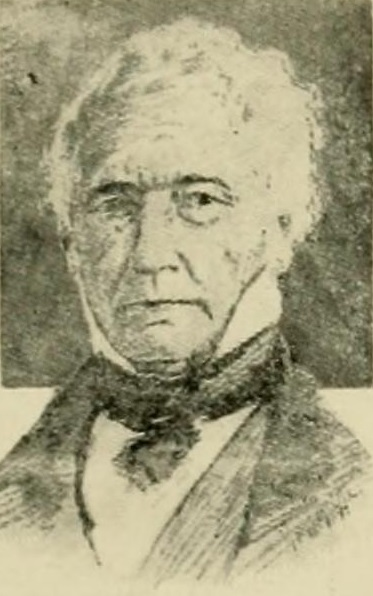

Member of the U.S. House of Representatives from Missouri's at-large district
- In office August 10, 1821 – March 3, 1827
- Preceded by: Himself (Delegate)
- Succeeded by: Edward Bates

Delegate to the U.S. House of Representatives from the Missouri Territory's at-large district
- In office August 4, 1817 – March 3, 1821
- Preceded by: Himself
- Succeeded by: Himself (Representative)
- In office August 6, 1816 – January 13, 1817
- Preceded by: Rufus Easton
- Succeeded by: Himself

Personal details
- Born: May 18, 1782 Hanover County, Virginia, U.S.
- Died: October 1, 1861 (aged 79) Ste. Genevieve, Missouri, U.S.
- Party: Democratic-Republican (Before 1824); National Republican (1824–1834)
- Relatives: Andrew Scott
- Education: Princeton University (BA)

John Scott (May 18, 1782 – October 1, 1861) was a delegate and a U.S. representative from Missouri.

Born in Hanover County, Virginia in 1782, Scott moved with his parents to Indiana Territory in 1802. He was graduated from Princeton College in 1805. He studied law. He was admitted to the bar and commenced practice in Ste. Genevieve, Missouri, in 1806. He owned slaves. He presented credentials as a Delegate-elect to the Fourteenth Congress from the Territory of Missouri and served from August 6, 1816 to January 13, 1817, when the election was declared illegal and the seat vacant.

Scott was elected as a Delegate to the Fifteenth and Sixteenth Congresses and served from August 4, 1817, to March 3, 1821. Upon the admission of Missouri as a State into the Union, Scott was elected as a Democratic-Republican to the Seventeenth Congress, reelected as an Adams-Clay Republican to the Eighteenth Congress, and elected as an Adams candidate to the Nineteenth Congress and served from August 10, 1821, to March 3, 1827. He served as chairman of the Committee on Public Lands (Nineteenth Congress). He was an unsuccessful candidate for reelection in 1826 to the Twentieth Congress. He resumed the practice of law. He died in Ste. Genevieve on October 1, 1861.

== Personal life ==
Scott had a son, Andre J. Scott who went to the California gold fields. His son was made the treasurer for the company of gold miners he fell in with. One of the men, Chas. Orr Baker of Boston, MA asked him to account for a $9 accounting discrepancy. In a fit of alcohol fueled temper, Andre stabbed the man. His fellow miners found him guilty of murder and hanged near Placerville, California April 3, 1851. Andre requested to be shot to spare his father's feelings because of his position in society, but was denied after a vote.

Scott's younger brother, Andrew Scott, also had a proclivity for violence. While serving as a judge in the Arkansas Territory, he is known to have dueled with and killed two men. He was never found guilty of murder.

U.S. House of Representatives
Preceded by Rufus Easton	Delegate to the U.S. House of Representatives from the Missouri Territory's at-large congressional district 1816–1817	Vacant Title next held by Himself
Vacant Title last held by Himself	Delegate to the U.S. House of Representatives from the Missouri Territory's at-large congressional district 1817–1821	Succeeded by Himself as U.S. Representative
Preceded by Himself as U.S. Delegate	Member of the U.S. House of Representatives from Missouri's at-large congressional district 1821–1827	Succeeded by Edward Bates
Preceded by Christopher Rankin	Chair of the House Public Lands Committee; 1826–1827	Succeeded by Jacob C. Isacks
