= 1824 Kentucky gubernatorial election =

- August 2, 1824
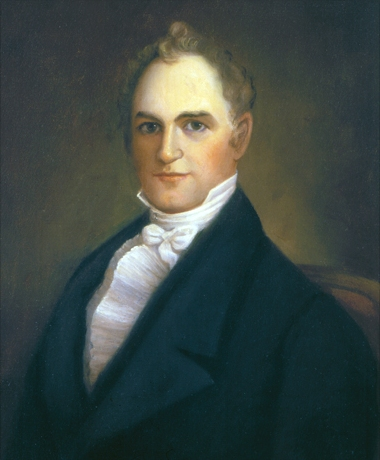

Nominee	Joseph Desha	Christopher Tompkins	William Russell
Party	Democratic-Republican	Democratic-Republican	Democratic-Republican
Popular vote	38,378	22,499	3,900
Percentage	59.25%	34.73%	6.02%
- Desha: 40–50% 50–60% 60–70% 70–80% 80–90% 90–100% Tompkins: 50–60% 60–70% 70–80% 80–90% Russell: 40–50% No Data/Vote
Governor before election
John Adair
Democratic-Republican
Elected Governor
Joseph Desha
Democratic-Republican

The 1824 Kentucky gubernatorial election was held on August 2, 1824.

Incumbent Democratic-Republican Governor John Adair was term-limited, and could not seek a second consecutive term.

Former U.S. Representative Joseph Desha defeated Christopher Tompkins and William Russell with 59.25% of the vote.

== General election ==
=== Candidates ===
- Joseph Desha, former U.S. Representative
- William Russell, member of the Kentucky House of Representatives
- Christopher Tompkins, former circuit judge

Desha represented the pro-relief faction and Tompkins and Russell represented the anti-relief faction.

=== Results ===
1824 Kentucky gubernatorial election (Note: Some sources give the result as Desha 38,463, Tompkins 22,300, Russell 3,899.) (Note: Some sources give Desha's vote as 38,369.)
Party	Candidate	Votes	%	±%
Democratic-Republican	Joseph Desha	38,378	59.25%	+39.36%
Democratic-Republican	Christopher Tompkins	22,499	34.73%	N/A
Democratic-Republican	William Russell	3,900	6.02%	N/A
Majority		15,879	24.52%	
Turnout		64,777		
Democratic-Republican hold		Swing		
