= 1824 Missouri gubernatorial election =

- August 2, 1824
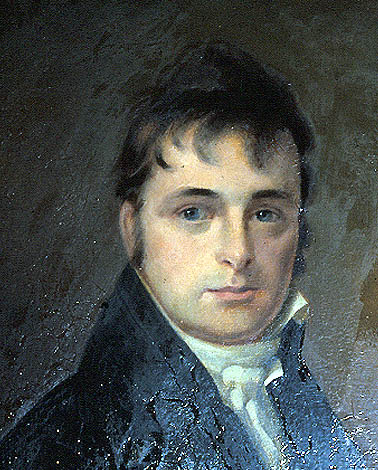

Nominee	Frederick Bates	William Henry Ashley
Party	Democratic-Republican	Democratic-Republican
Popular vote	6,165	4,631
Percentage	57.10%	42.90%
- County results Bates: 50–60% 60–70% 70–80% 80–90% 90–100% Ashley: 50–60% 70–80% 90–100% No Data/Vote
Governor before election
Alexander McNair
Democratic-Republican
Elected Governor
Frederick Bates
Democratic-Republican

The 1824 Missouri gubernatorial election was held on August 2, 1824, Frederick Bates defeated Lt. Gov William Henry Ashley. Both candidates were members of the Democratic-Republican Party. The death of Frederick Bates in August 1825, meant that the next election for governor of Missouri would be held little more than a year after this election.

== Results ==
1824 gubernatorial election, Missouri
Party	Candidate	Votes	%	±%
Democratic-Republican	Frederick Bates	6,165	57.10	
Democratic-Republican	William Henry Ashley	4,631	42.90	
Majority		1,534	14.20	−29.82
Turnout		10,796		
Democratic-Republican hold		Swing		
