= 1828 Connecticut gubernatorial election =

- April 10, 1828
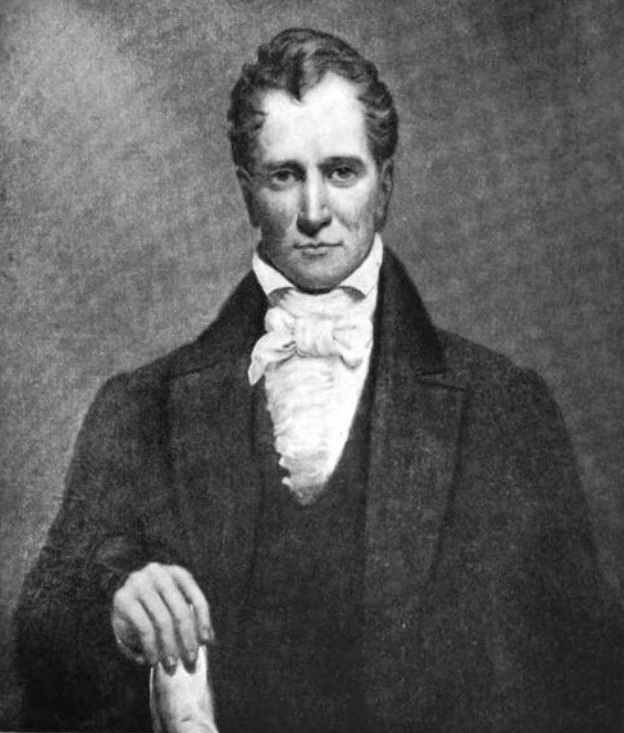
Nominee	Gideon Tomlinson
Party	National Republican
Popular vote	9,297
Percentage	97.73%
- Tomlinson: 60–70% 70–80% 80–90% 90–100% No Vote/Data
Governor before election
Gideon Tomlinson
Democratic-Republican Party (Tomlinson Faction)
Elected Governor
Gideon Tomlinson
National Republican

The 1828 Connecticut gubernatorial election was held on April 10, 1828. Incumbent governor and National Republican nominee Gideon Tomlinson ran essentially unopposed, winning with 97.73% of the vote amidst a scattering of votes.

== General election ==
=== Candidates ===
Major party candidates

- Gideon Tomlinson, National Republican/Anti-Jacksonian

=== Results ===
1828 Connecticut gubernatorial election
Party	Candidate	Votes	%	±%
National Republican	Gideon Tomlinson (incumbent)	9,297	97.73%	
Other	Others	216	2.27%	
Majority		9,081		
Turnout				
National Republican hold		Swing		
