= Missouri Territory's at-large congressional district =

- Obsolete district
- Created: 1812, as a non-voting delegate was granted by Congress
- Eliminated: 1821, as a result of statehood
- Years active: 1812–1821

On June 4, 1812, the Missouri Territory was created following the creation of the state of Louisiana. The Arkansas Territory was spun off in 1819. The state of Missouri was separated in 1821 and the remaining land was annexed by the Michigan Territory in 1834.

== List of delegates representing the district ==
#	Delegate	Party	Years	Cong ress	Electoral history
1	Edward Hempstead (St. Louis)	None	November 9, 1812– September 17, 1814	12th 13th	Elected in 1812. Retired.
2	Rufus Easton (St. Louis)	None	September 17, 1814 – August 6, 1816	13th 14th	Elected in 1814. Lost re-election.
3	John Scott (Ste. Genevieve)	None	August 6, 1816– January 13, 1817	14th 15th	Elected in 1816. Election declared illegal and seat vacated.
3	Vacant		January 13, 1817– August 4, 1817	15th	
3	John Scott (Ste. Genevieve)	None	August 4, 1817– March 3, 1821	15th 16th	Re-elected to finish his term. Re-elected in 1819. Statehood achieved.
