= 1828 Maine gubernatorial election =

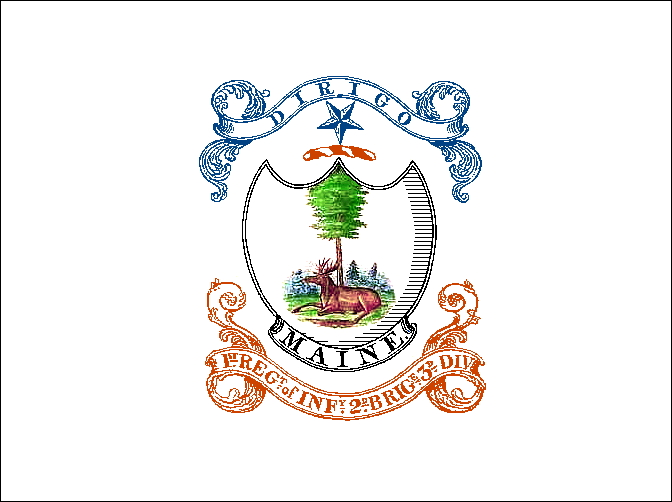
- September 8, 1828
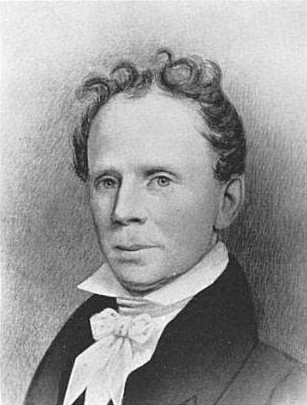
Nominee	Enoch Lincoln
Party	Democratic-Republican
Popular vote	25,745
Percentage	91.59%
- County results Lincoln: 70–80% 90–100%
Governor before election
Enoch Lincoln
Democratic-Republican
Elected Governor
Enoch Lincoln
Democratic-Republican

The 1828 Maine gubernatorial election took place on September 8, 1828. Incumbent Democratic-Republican Governor Enoch Lincoln won re-election to a third term. He faced no opposition.

== Results ==
1828 Maine gubernatorial election
Party	Candidate	Votes	%
Democratic-Republican	Enoch Lincoln (incumbent)	25,745	91.59%
Write-in		2,364	8.41%
Majority		23,381	83.18%
Total votes		28,109	100.00%
Democratic-Republican hold			
