= 1828 North Carolina gubernatorial election =

- December 6, 1828
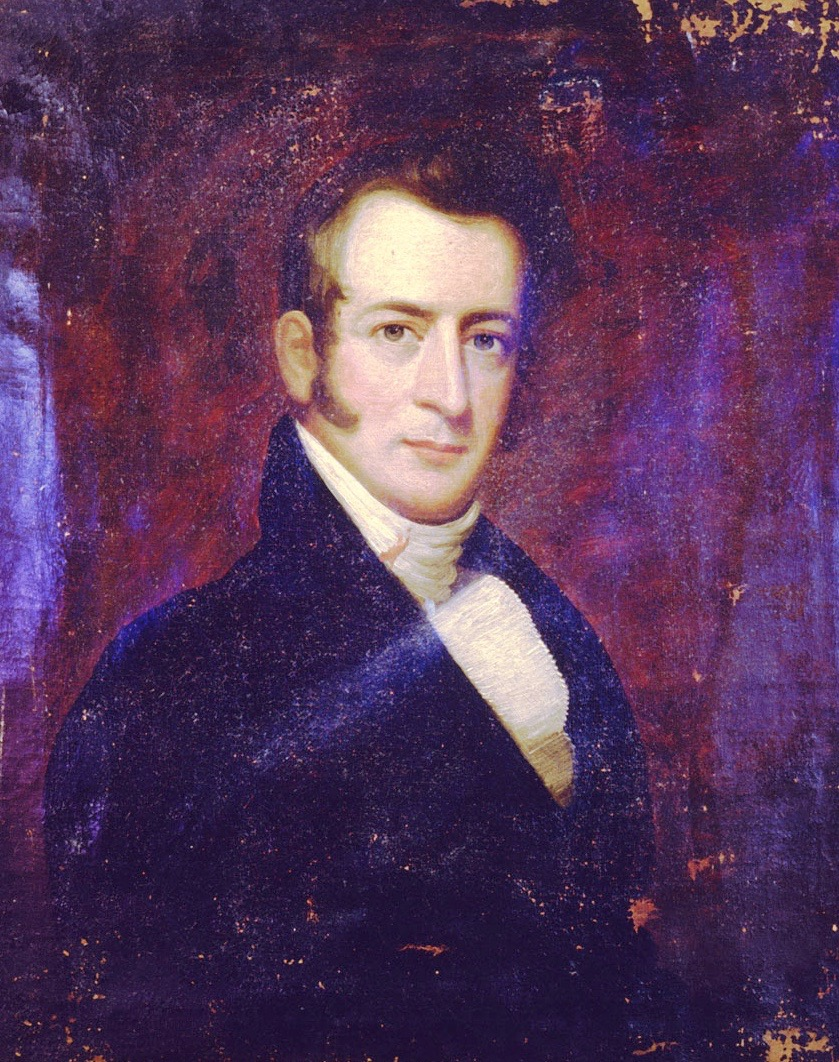

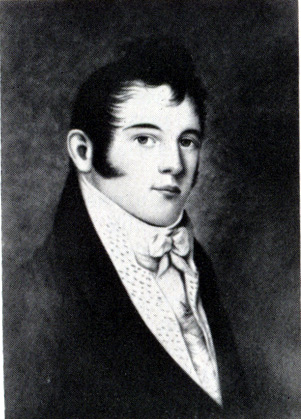
Nominee	John Owen	Richard Dobbs Spaight Jr.
Party	Democratic-Republican	Democratic-Republican
Popular vote	96	92
Percentage	50.53%	48.42%
Governor before election
James Iredell Jr.
Democratic-Republican
Elected Governor
John Owen
Democratic-Republican

The 1828 North Carolina gubernatorial election was held on December 6, 1828, in order to elect the Governor of North Carolina. Democratic-Republican candidate and former member of the North Carolina Senate John Owen was elected by the North Carolina General Assembly against fellow Democratic-Republican candidate and former member of the U.S. House of Representatives from North Carolina's 4th district Richard Dobbs Spaight Jr.

== General election ==
On election day, December 6, 1828, Democratic-Republican candidate John Owen was elected by the North Carolina General Assembly by a margin of 4 votes against his opponent fellow Democratic-Republican candidate Richard Dobbs Spaight Jr., thereby retaining Democratic-Republican control over the office of Governor. Owen was sworn in as the 24th Governor of North Carolina on December 12, 1828.

=== Results ===
North Carolina gubernatorial election, 1828
Party	Candidate	Votes	%
Democratic-Republican	John Owen	96	50.53
Democratic-Republican	Richard Dobbs Spaight Jr.	92	48.42
	scattering	2	1.05
Total votes		190	100.00
Democratic-Republican hold			
