= 1824 Maine gubernatorial election =

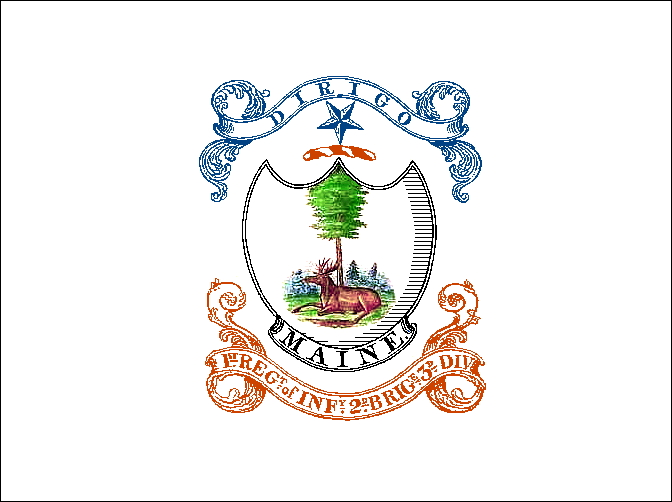
- September 13, 1824
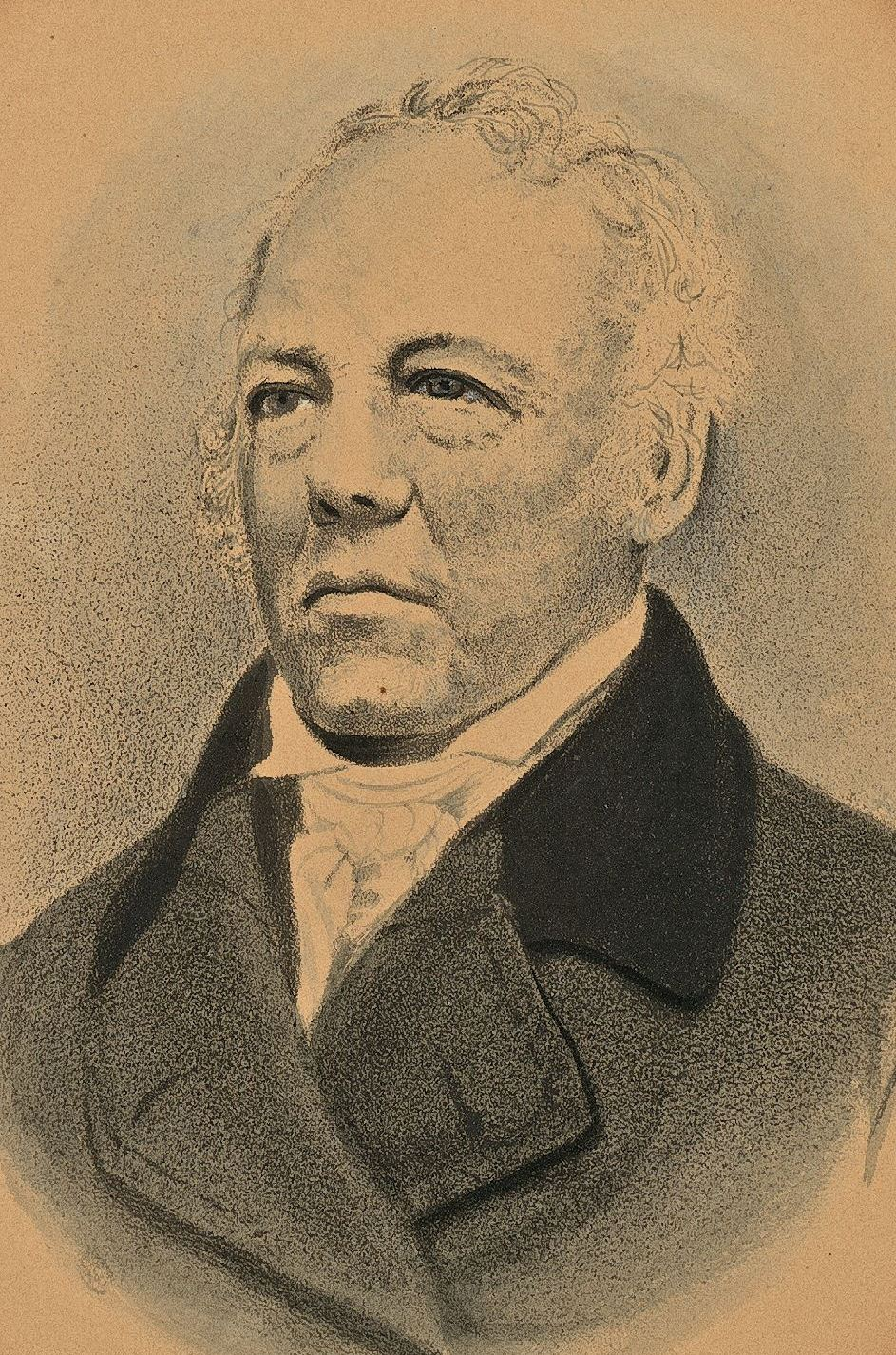
Nominee	Albion Parris
Party	Democratic-Republican
Popular vote	19,759
Percentage	96.77%
- County results Parris: 90–100%
Governor before election
Albion Parris
Democratic-Republican
Elected Governor
Albion Parris
Democratic-Republican

The 1824 Maine gubernatorial election took place on September 13, 1824. Incumbent Democratic-Republican Governor Albion Parris won re-election to a fourth term. He faced no opposition.

== Results ==
1824 Maine gubernatorial election
Party	Candidate	Votes	%
Democratic-Republican	Albion Parris (incumbent)	19,759 (Note: Some sources give Parris' vote as 19,779; this appears to be a calculation error in original sources.)	96.77%
Write-in		660	3.23%
Majority		19,099	93.54%
Total votes		20,419	100.00%
Democratic-Republican hold			
