= 1824 Boston mayoral election =

Election in Massachusetts, United States

- April 12, 1824
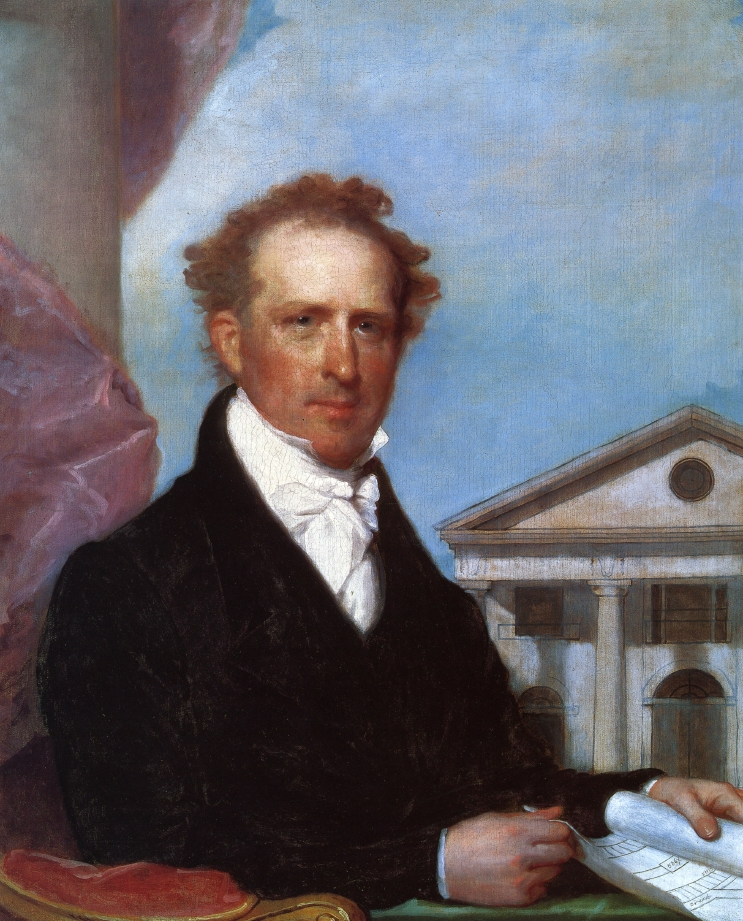
Candidate	Josiah Quincy III
Popular vote	3,867
Percentage	97.90%
Mayor before election
Josiah Quincy III
Federalist
Elected mayor
Josiah Quincy III
Federalist

The 1824 Boston mayoral election saw the reelection of incumbent Josiah Quincy III. It was held on April 12, 1824. Quincy was unopposed.

== Results ==
1824 Boston mayoral election
Candidate	Votes	%
Josiah Quincy III (incumbent)	3,867	97.90
Scattering	83	2.10
Total votes	3,950	100

== See also ==
- List of mayors of Boston, Massachusetts
