= 1828 Maryland gubernatorial election =

- January 7, 1828
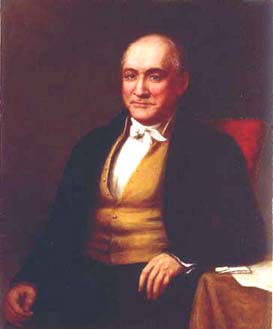
Nominee	Joseph Kent
Party	Democratic-Republican
Popular vote	80
Percentage	85.11%
Governor before election
Joseph Kent
Democratic-Republican
Elected Governor
Joseph Kent
Democratic-Republican

The 1828 Maryland gubernatorial election was held on January 7, 1828, in order to elect the governor of Maryland. Incumbent Democratic-Republican governor Joseph Kent was re-elected by the Maryland General Assembly against National Republican nominee and former speaker of the Maryland House of Delegates Benedict Joseph Semmes.

== General election ==
On election day, January 7, 1828, incumbent Democratic-Republican governor Joseph Kent was re-elected by the Maryland General Assembly, thereby retaining Democratic-Republican control over the office of governor. Kent was sworn in for his third term on January 17, 1828.

=== Results ===
Maryland gubernatorial election, 1828
Party	Candidate	Votes	%
Democratic-Republican	Joseph Kent (incumbent)	80	85.11
	Did Not Vote	13	13.83
National Republican	Benedict Joseph Semmes	1	1.06
Total votes		94	100.00
Democratic-Republican hold			
