= 1824 North Carolina gubernatorial election =

- December 2, 1824
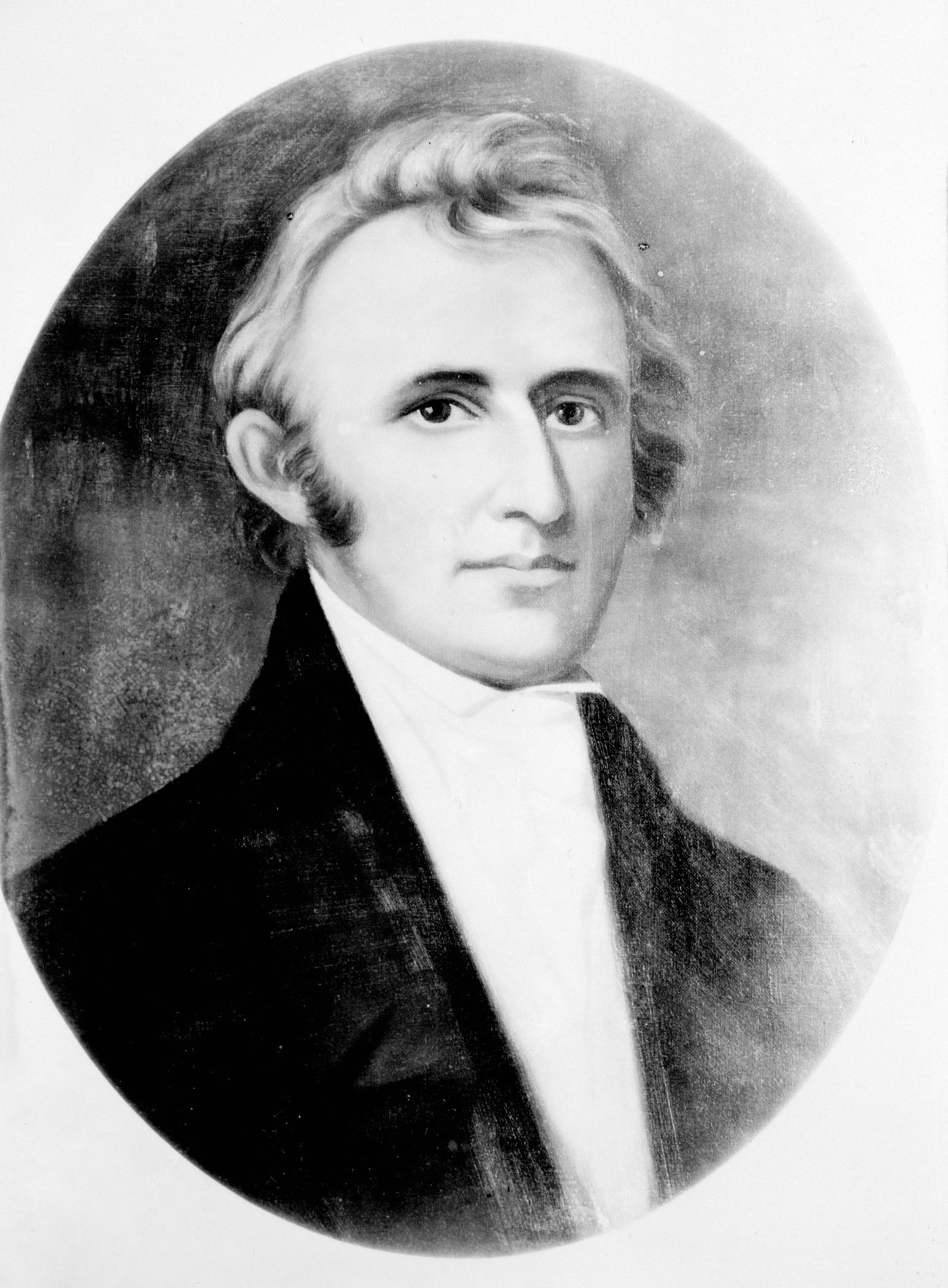

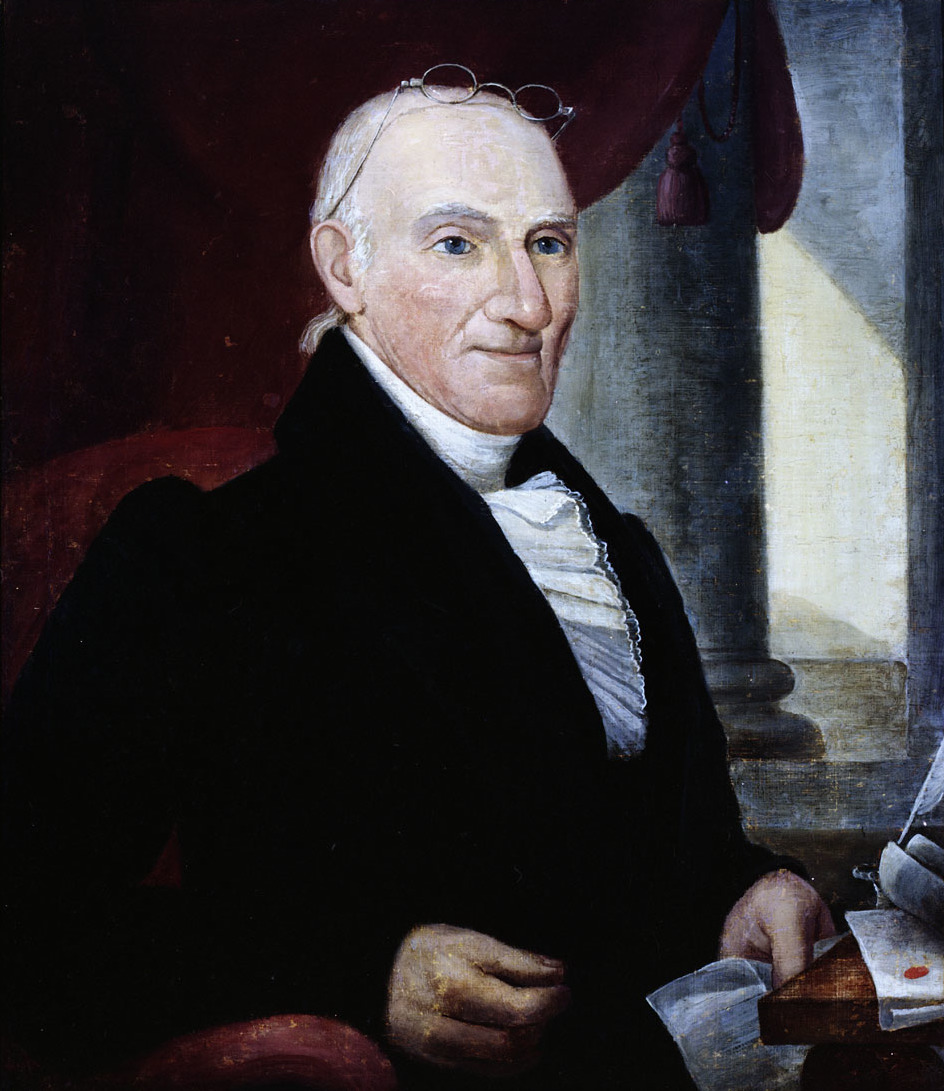

Nominee	Hutchins Gordon Burton	Montfort Stokes
Party	Democratic-Republican	Democratic-Republican
Popular vote	100	47
Percentage	52.63%	24.74%
Nominee	Alfred Moore	Isaac T. Avery
Party		Democratic-Republican
Popular vote	27	16
Percentage	14.21%	8.42%
Governor before election
Gabriel Holmes
Democratic-Republican
Elected Governor
Hutchins Gordon Burton
Democratic-Republican

The 1824 North Carolina gubernatorial election was held on December 2, 1824, in order to elect the Governor of North Carolina. Democratic-Republican candidate and former member of the U.S. House of Representatives from North Carolina's 2nd district Hutchins Gordon Burton was elected by the North Carolina General Assembly against Democratic-Republican candidate and former United States Senator from North Carolina Montfort Stokes, candidate Alfred Moore and Democratic-Republican candidate Isaac T. Avery.

== General election ==
On election day, December 2, 1824, Democratic-Republican candidate Hutchins Gordon Burton was elected by the North Carolina General Assembly by a margin of 53 votes against his foremost opponent fellow Democratic-Republican candidate Montfort Stokes, thereby retaining Democratic-Republican control over the office of Governor. Burton was sworn in as the 22nd Governor of North Carolina on December 7, 1824.

=== Results ===
North Carolina gubernatorial election, 1824
Party	Candidate	Votes	%
Democratic-Republican	Hutchins Gordon Burton	100	52.63
Democratic-Republican	Montfort Stokes	47	24.74
	Alfred Moore	27	14.21
Democratic-Republican	Isaac T. Avery	16	8.42
Total votes		184	100.00
Democratic-Republican hold			
