= 1828 Ohio's 6th congressional district special election =

William Creighton Junior

In Ohio's 6th district, incumbent William Creighton Jr. resigned before December 19, 1828, when he was given a recess appointment to be a United States District Judge. He was also nominated for the judgeship, but that appointment was not approved by the U.S. Senate by February 1829. Creighton was already elected to the next term and was reseated in his old position when the next Congress began in March 1829.

Francis S. Muhlenberg was elected December 2, 1828 only to finish that short term.

== See also ==
- 1828 United States House of Representatives elections in Ohio
- List of United States representatives from Ohio
