= 1828 Connecticut lieutenant gubernatorial election =

- April 10, 1828
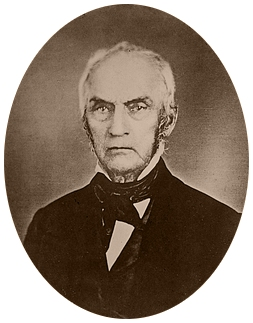
Nominee	John Samuel Peters
Party	National Republican
Popular vote	4,725
Percentage	92.60%
Lieutenant Governor before election
John Samuel Peters
National Republican
Elected Lieutenant Governor
John Samuel Peters
National Republican

The 1828 Connecticut lieutenant gubernatorial election was held on April 10, 1828, in order to elect the lieutenant governor of Connecticut. Incumbent National Republican lieutenant governor John Samuel Peters won re-election as he ran with minimal opposition.

== General election ==
On election day, April 10, 1828, incumbent National Republican lieutenant governor John Samuel Peters won re-election with 92.60% of the vote, thereby retaining National Republican control over the office of lieutenant governor. Peters was sworn in for his second term on May 7, 1828.

=== Results ===
Connecticut lieutenant gubernatorial election, 1828
Party	Candidate	Votes	%
National Republican	John Samuel Peters (incumbent)	4,725	92.60
	Scattering	375	7.40
Total votes		5,100	100.00
National Republican hold			
