= 1828 Ohio gubernatorial election =

- October 14, 1828
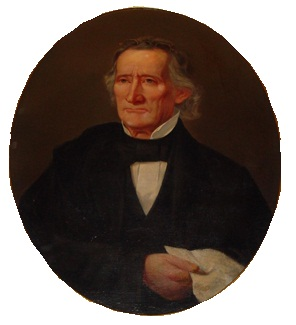

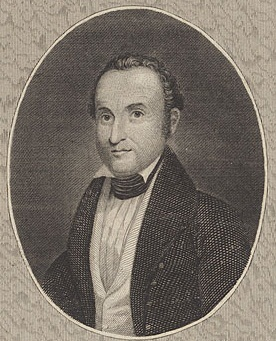
Nominee	Allen Trimble	John Wilson Campbell
Party	National Republican	Democratic
Popular vote	53,970	51,951
Percentage	50.90%	49.00%
County results
Trimble
50–60%
60–70%
70–80%
80–90%
90–100%
Campbell
50–60%
60–70%
70–80%
80–90%
No data/vote
Governor before election
Allen Trimble
National Republican
Elected Governor
Allen Trimble
National Republican

The 1828 Ohio gubernatorial election was held on October 14, 1828, to elect the governor of Ohio. Incumbent National Republican governor Allen Trimble won re-election against Democratic candidate and former member of the U.S. House of Representatives from Ohio's 5th district John Wilson Campbell.

== General election ==
On election day, October 14, 1828, incumbent National Republican governor Allen Trimble won re-election by a margin of 2,019 votes against his opponent Democratic-Republican candidate John Wilson Campbell, thereby retaining National Republican control over the office of governor. Trimble was sworn in for his second term in December 1828.

=== Results ===
Ohio gubernatorial election, 1828
Party	Candidate	Votes	%
National Republican	Allen Trimble (incumbent)	53,970	50.90%
Democratic	John Wilson Campbell	51,951	49.00%
	Scattering	112	0.10%
Total votes		106,033	100.00%
National Republican hold			
