= 1824 Connecticut lieutenant gubernatorial election =

- April 5, 1824
Nominee	David Plant
Party	National Republican
Popular vote	4,828
Percentage	86.05%
- Plant: 30–40% 40–50% 50–60% 60–70% 70–80% 80–90% 90–100% Pilkin: 50–60% 60–70% 70–80% Sherman: 80–90% Tie: 30–40% No Data/Vote
Lieutenant Governor before election
David Plant
National Republican
Elected Lieutenant Governor
David Plant
National Republican

The 1824 Connecticut lieutenant gubernatorial election was held on April 5, 1824, in order to elect the lieutenant governor of Connecticut. Incumbent National Republican lieutenant governor David Plant won re-election as he ran with minimal opposition.

== General election ==
On election day, April 5, 1824, incumbent National Republican lieutenant governor David Plant won re-election with 86.05% of the vote, thereby retaining National Republican control over the office of lieutenant governor. Plant was sworn in for his second term on May 5, 1824.

=== Results ===
Connecticut lieutenant gubernatorial election, 1824
Party	Candidate	Votes	%
National Republican	David Plant (incumbent)	4,828	86.05
	Scattering	783	13.95
Total votes		5,611	100.00
National Republican hold			
