= Alexander McNair =

American politician (1775–1826)

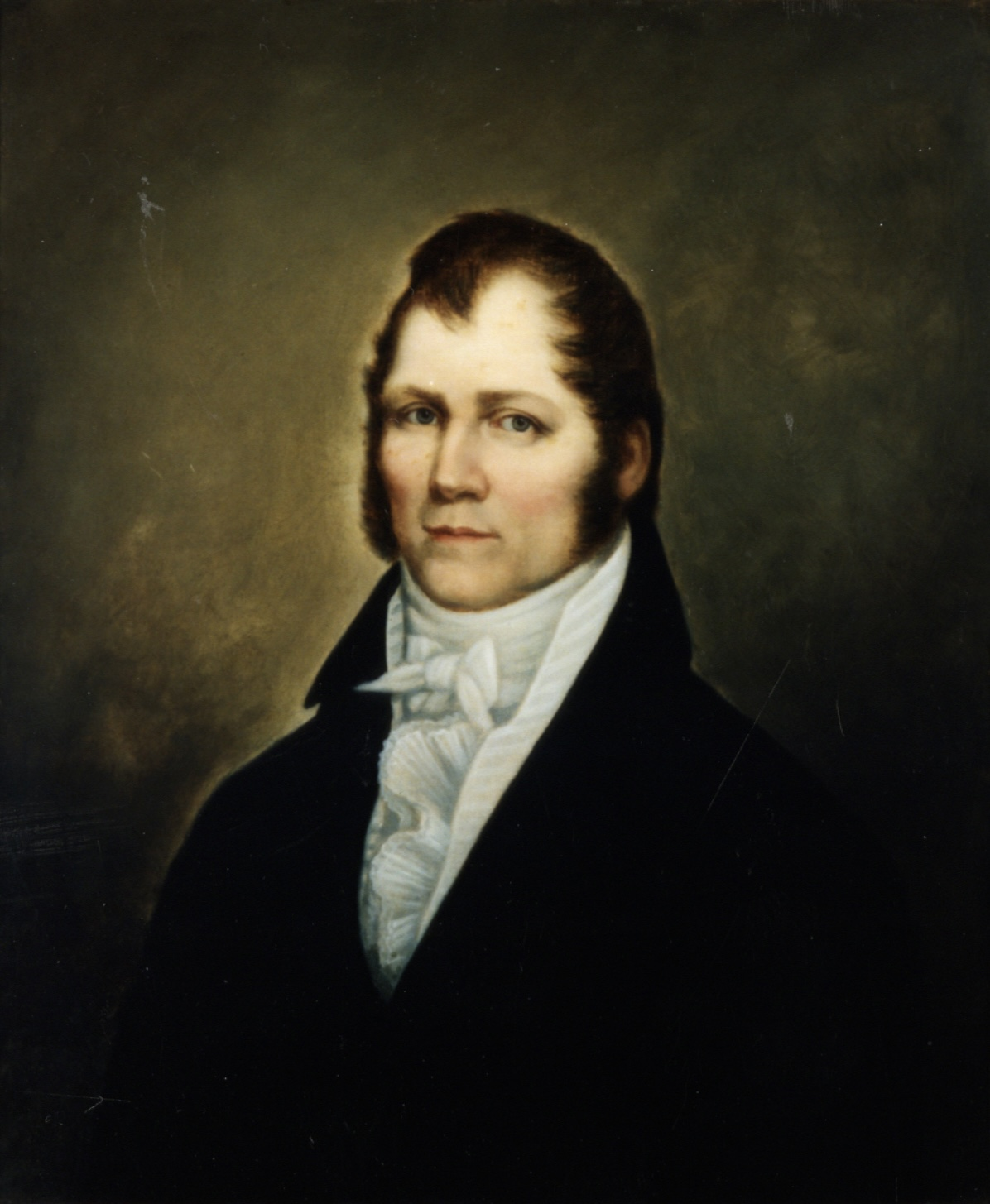

1st Governor of Missouri
- In office September 18, 1820 – November 15, 1824
- Lieutenant: William Henry Ashley
- Preceded by: William Clark as Territorial Governor
- Succeeded by: Frederick Bates

Personal details
- Born: May 5, 1775 Lancaster, Province of Pennsylvania, British America
- Died: March 18, 1826 (aged 50) St. Louis, Missouri, U.S.
- Resting place: Calvary Cemetery
- Occupation: frontiersman, politician

Alexander McNair (May 5, 1775 – March 18, 1826) was an American frontiersman and politician. He was the first governor of Missouri from prior to its entry as a state in 1820, until 1824.

== Early life ==
Alexander McNair was born in Lancaster in the Province of Pennsylvania and grew up in Mifflin County. His grandfather, David McNair Sr., immigrated to Pennsylvania from Donaghmore, County Donegal, Ireland around 1733 and had Scottish ancestors from Loch Lomond. David McNair Jr., Alexander's father (b. 1736), fought with General George Washington in the Trenton and Princeton campaigns in the winter of 1776–77, and died in February 1777 as a result of wounds received in battle and exposure when Alexander was less than two years old. Alexander went to school as a child, and attended one term at the College of Philadelphia (now the University of Pennsylvania). He reached an agreement with his mother and brothers that the brothers would have a boxing match and that the winner would receive the father's property. Alexander was defeated. He became a member of the Pennsylvania militia and fought for the government in the Whiskey Rebellion in 1791 and 1794.

== Missouri ==
In 1804, McNair traveled to what is now Missouri, the United States having just acquired it following the Louisiana Purchase. In that year, he married Marguerite Suzanne de Reihle de Regal, the daughter of a French marquis. He lived in St. Louis, Missouri, participated in Freemasonry as a member of St. Louis Lodge 111, and served as a United States Marshal. He also became a successful businessman, and served two terms on the Board of Trustees of the Town of St. Louis, in 1808 and 1813.

On May 24, 1813, Stephen F. Austin, who was later responsible for the colonization of Texas, and for whom Austin, Texas is named, was commissioned an ensign in the Missouri militia. Later in September, he enlisted as a private in the First Regiment of Mounted Militia commanded by Colonel Alexander McNair.

McNair was elected governor in 1820, receiving 72% of the vote and defeating the famous explorer William Clark. After his time as governor, he worked in the Indian Department until his death.

== Death ==
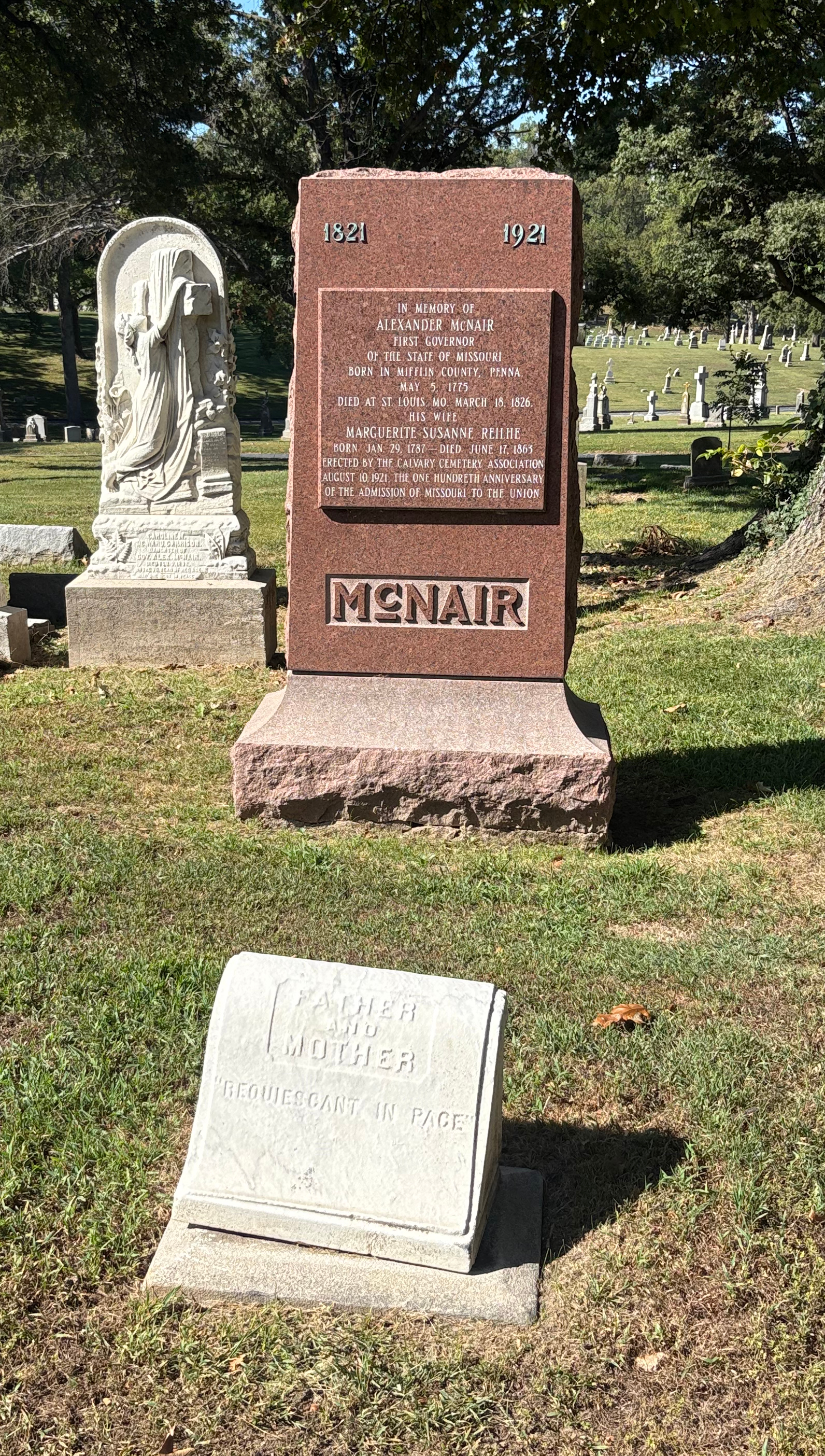
McNair's grave at Calvary Cemetery

Alexander McNair died of influenza, and was buried in Calvary Cemetery in St. Louis.

Political offices
Preceded by William Clark (Territorial Governor)	Governor of Missouri; 1820–1824	Succeeded by Frederick Bates
