= Benjamin Harrison Reeves =

American politician

Benjamin H. Reeves
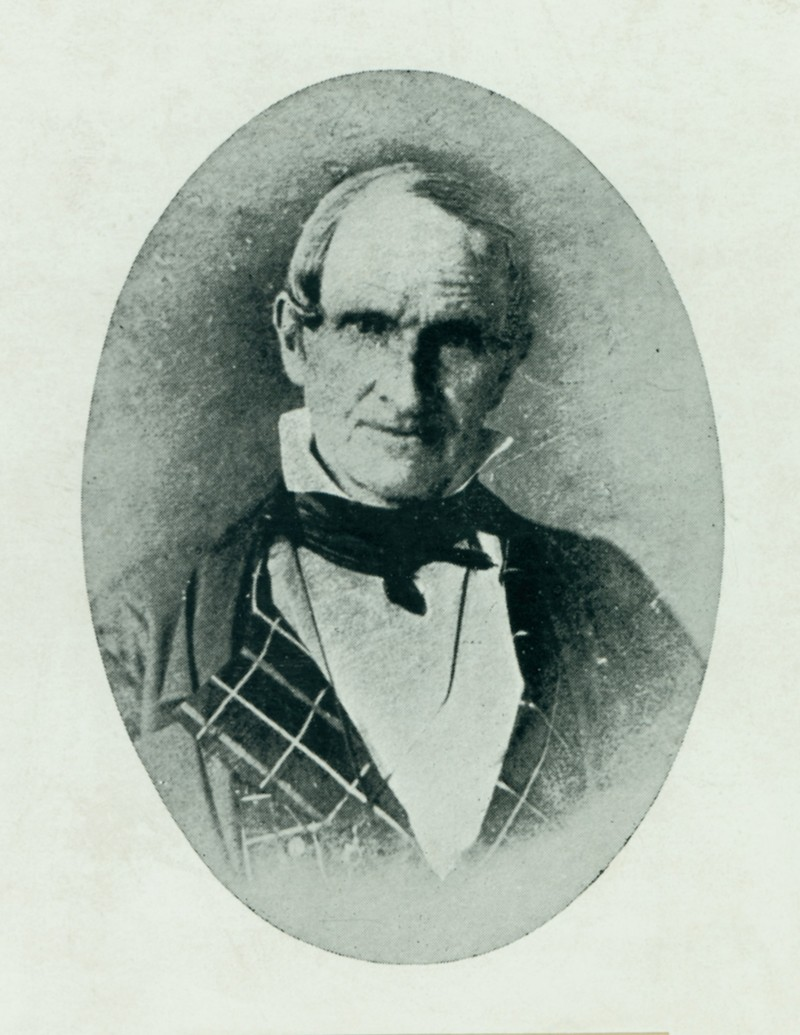

2nd Lieutenant Governor of Missouri
- In office November 15, 1824 – July 1825
- Governor: Frederick Bates
- Preceded by: William Henry Ashley
- Succeeded by: Vacant until 1828

Personal details
- Born: March 21, 1787 Augusta County, Virginia
- Died: April 16, 1849 (aged 62) Todd County, Kentucky, U.S.
- Party: Democratic-Republican Party

Benjamin Harrison Reeves (March 21, 1787 – April 16, 1849) was an American politician and the second Lieutenant Governor of Missouri. A Democratic-Republican, he served in the office for less than one year.

== Biography ==
Benjamin Harrison Reeves, named for a signer of the Declaration of Independence, Benjamin Harrison V, was born March 21, 1787, in Augusta County, Virginia, to parents Brewer and Martha (Davis) Reeves. The Reeves family moved to Christian County, Kentucky, when Benjamin was around thirteen years old, but soon were beset by tragedy. Brewer Reeves, a veteran of the American Revolutionary War, died shortly after the move to Kentucky, leaving the teenage Benjamin, the eldest child, to help raise and support his three younger siblings. On November 12, 1806, in Lincoln County, Kentucky, he married Martha "Patsy" Donley. When the War of 1812 broke out in June, 1812 Reeves helped organize a company of volunteers for duty and was elected Captain of the group. Attached to American forces in the Indiana Territory, Reeves was promoted to Major. He and his Kentuckians participated in the rescue mission of Zachary Taylor and his garrison at the Siege of Fort Harrison in September, 1812.

=== Political life ===
In November, 1812 Benjamin Reeves was called back to Kentucky from the war, having been elected to the state legislature that August. He would serve in the legislature until 1818 when Reeves and his family moved to the Missouri Territory, settling in Howard County. Befitting his previous legislative experience, the people of the county chose Reeves as one of their delegates to Missouri's first Constitutional Convention in 1820–21. In 1824 Reeves was elected Missouri's second Lieutenant Governor, however he would hold the post for just a few brief months before resigning to accept a position with the United States government as a commissioner to survey the Santa Fe Trail. When Missouri Governor Frederick Bates died in office in August, 1825 Benjamin Reeves, as Lieutenant Governor, would have taken over the rest of the term. However the Governorship went instead to Missouri Senate President Pro Tempore Abraham J. Williams until a special election could be held.

In one of his first acts as U.S. President John Quincy Adams appointed Benjamin Reeves and two other men -- George C. Sibley and Pierre Menard—to oversee the surveying of the Santa Fe Trail and establish peaceful relations with Native American tribes along the trail if possible so as to prevent attacks on trade. With Thomas Mather replacing Menard, the "Sibley Expedition" left Fort Osage in April 1825. On a tributary of the Neosho River, the expedition met with leaders of the Kansa and Osage Nations and reached an agreement for safe passage for wagon trains and traders. In turn, Sibley named the area "Council Grove," which later became present-day Council Grove, Kansas. The group then followed the Arkansas River to the 100th Meridian, where they awaited permission from Mexico to enter their territory. Along the way from Fort Osage to this point the group erected mounts to guide future travelers. Permission to enter Mexico was granted in September 1825. Sibley continued south, eventually reaching Taos while Reeves and Mather returned to Missouri to report on the expedition's progress.

== Later years ==
In May, 1835 Benjamin Reeves suffered a personal tragedy when his wife Patsy died. The next year Reeves and his family left Missouri and returned to Kentucky, settling in Todd County. He remarried in August, 1836 to Virginia T. Garth. Reeves resumed a life in politics, serving several terms in the Kentucky legislature until his death. Benjamin Harrison Reeves died April 16, 1849, at his home in Todd County after several months of illness.

Political offices
Preceded by William Henry Ashley	Lieutenant Governor of Missouri; 1824–1825	Succeeded by Vacant until November, 1828
