= Abraham J. Williams =

American politician (1781–1839)

3rd Governor of Missouri
- In office August 4, 1825 – January 20, 1826
- Lieutenant: Vacant
- Preceded by: Frederick Bates
- Succeeded by: John Miller

Member of the Missouri Senate
- In office 1822

Personal details
- Born: February 26, 1781 Hardy County, West Virginia, US
- Died: December 30, 1839 (aged 58) Boone County, Missouri, US
- Party: Democratic-Republican,
- Occupation: Merchant, farmer

Abraham J. Williams (February 26, 1781 – December 30, 1839) was an American politician from Boone County, Missouri. He was the third governor of Missouri, serving an unelected interim term in 1825 and 1826 following the death of Frederick Bates. He also served in the Missouri State Senate.

== Biography ==
Williams was born on February 26, 1871, in Hardy County, Virginia, to Vincent and Elizabeth Williams. Williams was born physically challenged, with one leg severely atrophied. Very little is known about his childhood or education, as even friends considered him a very private man. Abraham Williams arrived in the Missouri Territory sometime between 1816 and 1820 and settled in Franklin, Howard County, Missouri. At the time Franklin was a hotbed of political activity in the soon-to-be state, with many prominent men in early Missouri history residing there. In 1820 Williams moved a few miles away to Nashville, Missouri, a small community in Boone County where he and business partner James Harris ran a tobacco warehouse.

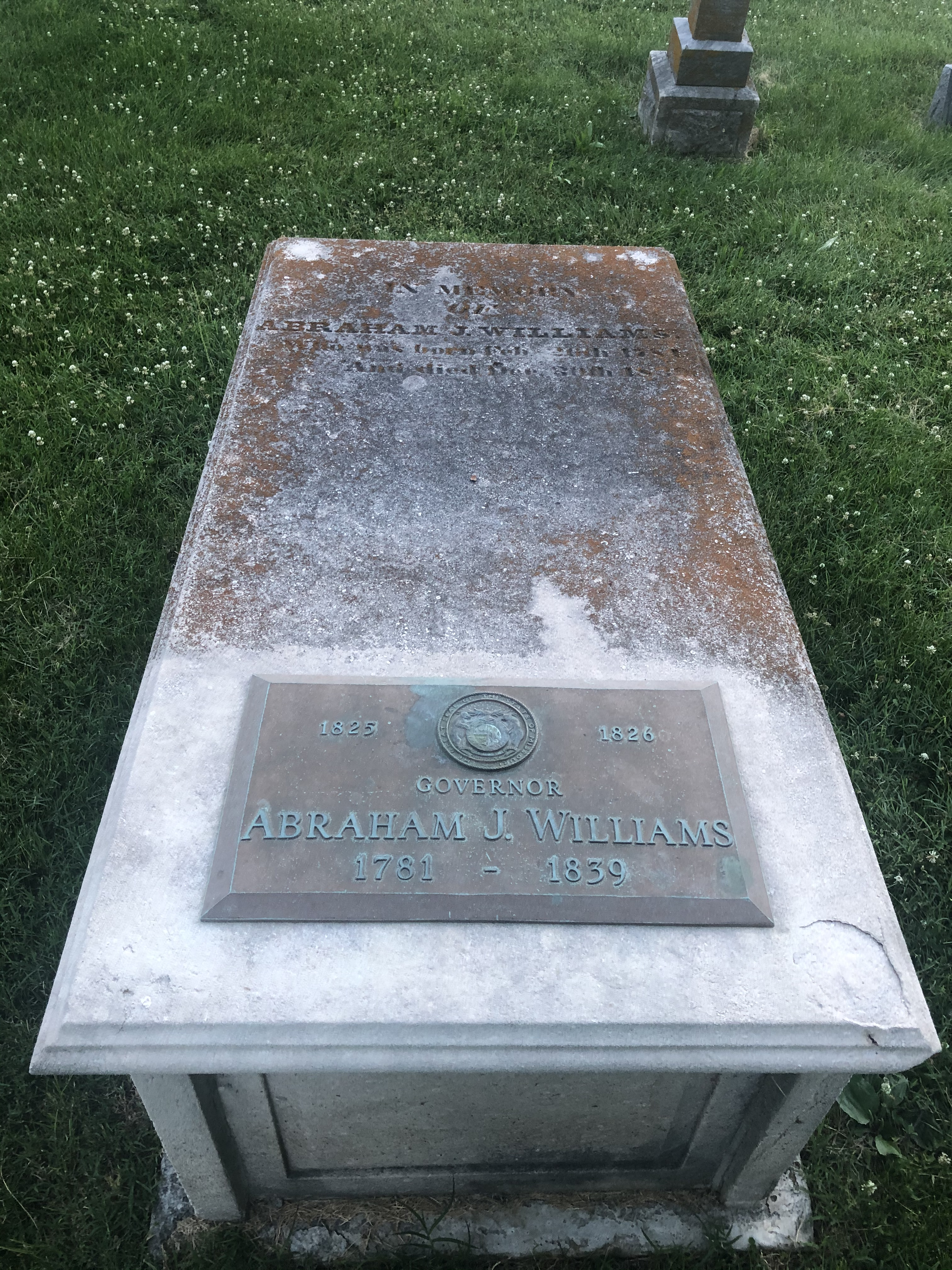
Tombstone of Abraham J. Williams in the Columbia Cemetery

Within a few years, Williams was on the move again, this time to Columbia, Missouri, where he established one of the first dry goods stores in the town, also providing services as a boot and shoe maker. He also purchased a large tract of land in the county and began farming operations. In 1822 Abraham Williams was elected to the Missouri State Senate as a Democratic-Republican, beginning a brief foray into politics that would lead to his election as governor. When he was re-elected to the senate in 1824 his peer chose him as President-pro-tem. He also served on the Accounts and Education committees, both important positions in the newborn state, and on the committee responsible for planning the new Missouri state capitol building.

At the time of Governor Frederick Bates's death in office on August 4, 1825, Missouri had no Lieutenant Governor—the elected one, Benjamin Harrison Reeves, having previously resigned. Under the state constitution at that time Williams was next in line to serve until a special election could be held. Abraham Williams few months as governor produced nothing remarkable, as his time in office was so limited. The state General Assembly was out of session for most of his time as governor and he neither made appointments to state positions nor signed any important legislation. One of the few official documents he signed was to offer the then-large reward of two hundred dollars ($200) for the apprehension of escaped prisoner John Patterson, convicted of murder and sentenced to death by St. Francois County jury. The aforementioned special election was held on December 5, 1825, with voters choosing John Miller, who assumed the office from Williams on January 20, 1826.

Williams resumed his position in the Senate until he was defeated later in 1826 during the regularly scheduled elections. Williams then returned to his large scale farming activities in Boone County. In 1832 his name was put forth to the General Assembly by political allies as a candidate for the United States Senate. However this was the "Age of Benton" in Missouri, and Senator Thomas Hart Benton was elected to his third term by an overwhelming margin. Abraham J. Williams died on December 20, 1839. A lifelong bachelor, he left no children or close family and no will. His estate included nearly a thousand acres of farmland south of Columbia, as well as several building lots within the city. Williams is buried in the Columbia Cemetery, Columbia, Missouri.

Political offices
Preceded by Frederick Bates	Governor of Missouri; 1825–1826	Succeeded by John Miller
