= Frederick Bates (politician) =

American politician and judge (1777–1825)

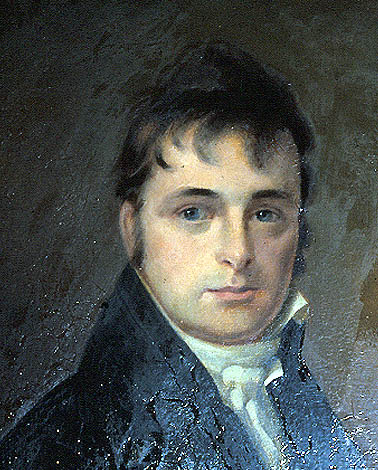

2nd Governor of Missouri
- In office November 15, 1824 – August 4, 1825
- Lieutenant: Benjamin Harrison Reeves
- Preceded by: Alexander McNair
- Succeeded by: Abraham J. Williams

Personal details
- Born: June 23, 1777 Goochland County, Virginia, US
- Died: August 4, 1825 (aged 48) Chesterfield, Missouri, US
- Spouse: Nancy Opie Ball
- Relations: Edward (brother), James (brother); see Bates extended family

Frederick Bates (June 23, 1777 – August 4, 1825) was an American attorney and politician. He was elected in 1824 as the second governor of Missouri and died in office in 1825. Before that he had served as a justice of the Territorial Supreme Court for Michigan Territory, was appointed by Thomas Jefferson as secretary of the Louisiana Territory, and started to build his political base in St. Louis.

== Early life and education ==
Frederick Bates was born in 1777 into the slave-holding class in Goochland County, Virginia. Though a Quaker, Bates and his family were lifelong slaveholders. Bates was schooled privately at his family's Belmont plantation by tutors. He went to college and read law with an established firm. He settled in Detroit in 1797 and became its first postmaster in 1803. He was a member of the Bates family along with his brothers Edward and James Woodson Bates.

== Career ==
After working as an attorney, Bates started his political career when appointed as a justice of the Territorial Supreme Court for Michigan Territory in Detroit. He received a significant promotion when the Aaron Burr conspiracy was uncovered. In February 1807, while Bates was in Washington, President Thomas Jefferson appointed him to be secretary of the Louisiana Territory, as well as a recorder of land titles. As secretary, he was also commander in chief of the militia. He held this position in St. Louis until 1812. Bates helped determine whether conflicting French, Spanish, and American land claims in the territory would be upheld, as it had been subject to three differing political systems.

Jefferson had already decided on the returning explorer and fellow Virginian Meriwether Lewis as governor of the huge new Louisiana Territory, which approximately equaled the size of the existing United States. Bates preceded Lewis to St. Louis and became a powerful political force in the new territory; he was a political rival of Lewis until the latter's death while traveling from St. Louis to Washington on business in 1809. Later, as secretary of the newly formed Missouri Territory (1812–1821), he became acting governor in the frequent absences of Territorial Governor William Clark.

In the August 1824 election, Bates was elected the second governor of Missouri. He died in office in August 1825 in Chesterfield, Missouri, due to a short illness thought to be pneumonia. Bates was buried at the family cemetery on the Thornhill estate near St. Louis.

== Marriage and family ==
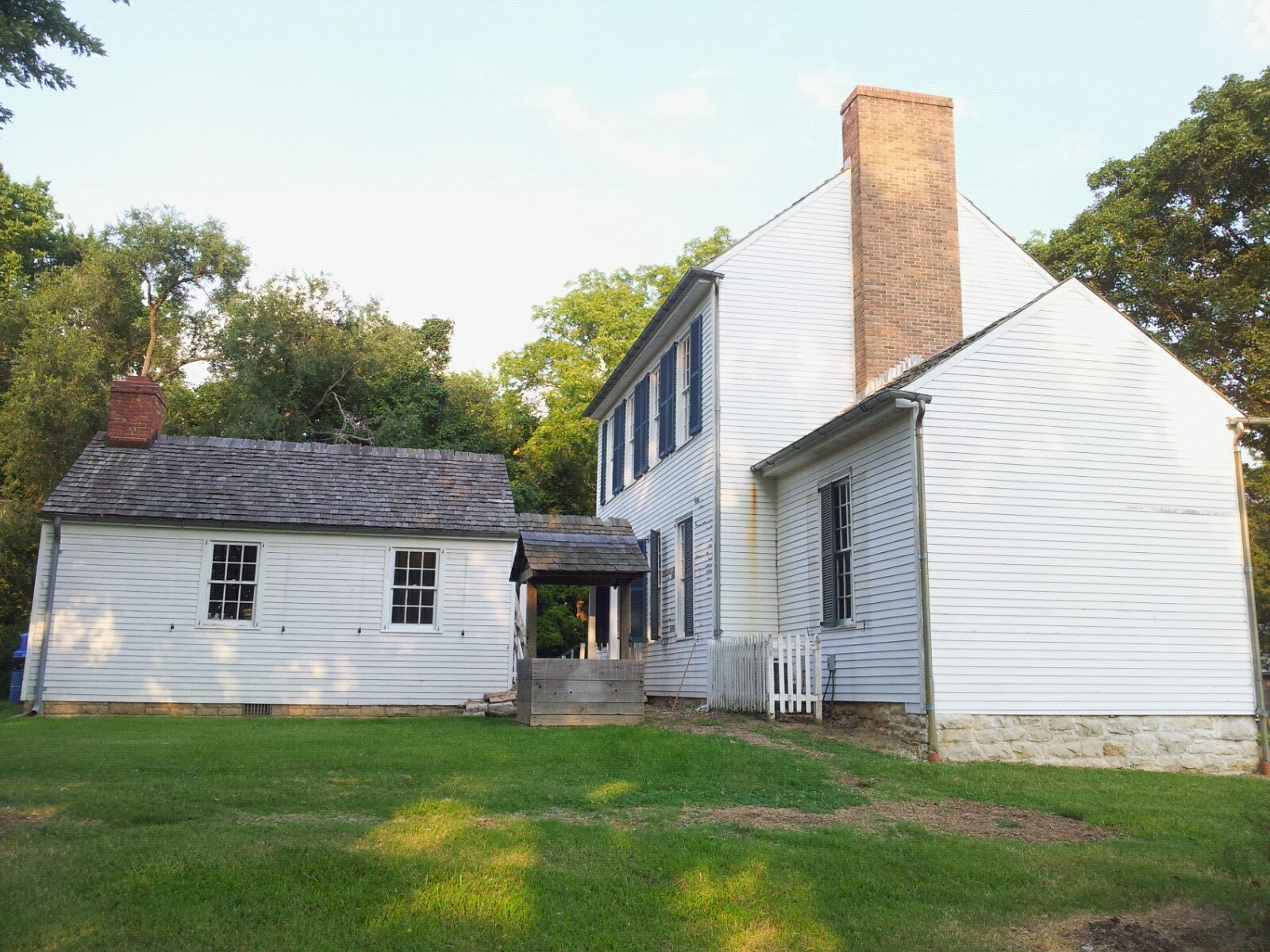
Main house at Thornhill, Bates' estate

In 1819, Bates married Nancy Opie Ball (1802–1877), daughter of a wealthy Virginia colonel. The couple had four children, Emily Caroline (1820–1891), Lucius Lee (1821–1898), Woodville (1823–1840) and Frederick Jr. (1826–1862).

During his time in Missouri, Bates acquired nearly 1000 acres (4 km^{2}) of land, which he called Thornhill. He also acquired several enslaved men, women, and children. He had built a Federal-style home with high ceilings for summer ventilation, fine woodwork and a sophisticated floor plan; all this would have been familiar to Bates from his childhood home, Belmont, in Goochland County, Virginia. The Thornhill estate still exists today and can be viewed by the public. It is located in Faust County Park in Chesterfield, Missouri.

== Legacy and honors ==
Bates is the namesake of Bates County, Missouri.

Political offices
| Preceded by Alexander McNair | Governor of Missouri; 1824–1825 | Succeeded by Abraham J. Williams |
