= George L. Shepley =

American politician (1854–1924)

George Leander Shepley (October 11, 1854 – August 3, 1924) was an American politician. In 1902 and 1903 he was lieutenant governor of the state of Rhode Island.

== Career ==
Born in Dover, New Hampshire, Shepley attended public schools in Providence, where he had moved with his parents in 1856. After leaving school, he worked in the insurance industry all his life. From 1879 he formed a partnership with James Starkweather and the firm, Starkweather & Shepley, afterwards incorporated, finally controlled one of the largest insurance businesses in the world, with offices in New York, Chicago and Boston. Their business influence extended to Europe. Shepley also became President of the Rhode Island Insurance Company and the Shepley Land Company. He was also the director of several industrial and banking companies.

Politically, Shepley was a member of the Republican Party. In 1897 he served on the staff of Governor Elisha Dyer Jr. After the death of his successor William Gregory, the then Lieutenant Governor Charles D. Kimball became the new governor of Rhode Island. The state legislature then elected Shepley as the new lieutenant governor on February 18, 1902.

He held this office between 1902 and 1903. He was Deputy Governor and Chairman of the State Senate. After serving as Lieutenant Governor, Shepley also devoted himself to his passion for collecting books about the state of Rhode Island, eventually setting up his own library in Benefit Street, Providence. Because of his interest in this literature, he was granted the honorary degree of A. M. by Brown University in 1921. He was elected to the American Antiquarian Society in April 1920. He died in Warwick on August 3, 1924.

Political offices
Preceded by Charles D. Kimball	Lieutenant Governor of Rhode Island; 1902–1903	Succeeded by Adelard Archambault
