= Governor Higgins =

Governor Higgins may refer to:

- Frank W. Higgins (1856–1907), 35th Governor of New York
- James H. Higgins (1876–1927), 50th Governor of Rhode Island

== See also ==
- Ambrosio O'Higgins, 1st Marquess of Osorno (1720–1801), military governor of Chile
