= Lucius F. C. Garvin =

American politician

Lucius Garvin
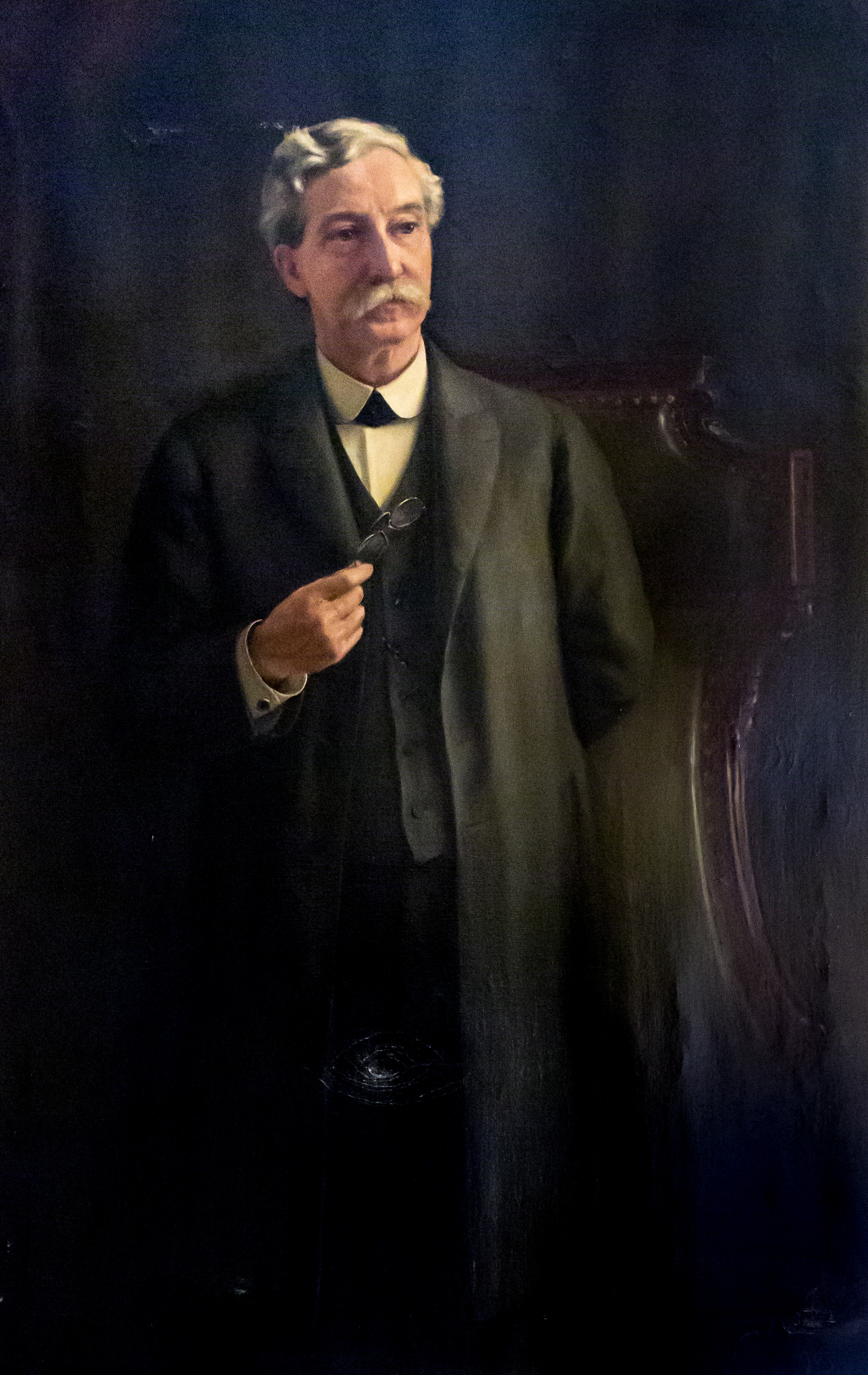

48th Governor of Rhode Island
- In office January 3, 1903 – January 3, 1905
- Lieutenant: Adelard Archambault; George H. Utter
- Preceded by: Charles D. Kimball
- Succeeded by: George H. Utter

Member of the Rhode Island House of Representatives
- In office 1883

Personal details
- Born: November 13, 1841 Knoxville, Tennessee, U.S.
- Died: October 2, 1922 (aged 80) Lonsdale, Rhode Island, U.S.
- Resting place: Swan Point Cemetery
- Party: Democratic
- Spouse(s): Lucy Waterman Southmayd; Sarah Emma Tomlinson
- Education: Amherst College

Military service
- Allegiance: (United States) United States; Union
- Branch/service: United States Army; Union Army
- Rank: Private
- Unit: 51st Massachusetts Infantry
- Battles/wars: American Civil War

Lucius Fayette Clark Garvin (November 13, 1841 – October 2, 1922) was an American physician and the 48th governor of Rhode Island from 1903 to 1905. He also served many terms in the Rhode Island House of Representatives and several terms in the Rhode Island Senate.

== Early life ==
Lucius Garvin was born in 1841 in Knoxville, Tennessee. His father, James Garvin, was a professor at East Tennessee University. In 1862, Lucius graduated from Amherst College. With the American Civil War underway, he enlisted as a private in Company E of the 51st Regiment Massachusetts Volunteer Infantry.

After the war, Garvin was trained as a physician at Harvard Medical School. He interned at Boston City Hospital and graduated in 1867.

== Career ==
Garvin set up a private practice in Pawtucket, Rhode Island. In 1876, Garvin relocated to Lonsdale, Rhode Island.

Garvin became involved in politics, serving first as town moderator for Cumberland, Rhode Island, in 1881. He became known as a progressive in the mold of Henry George, championing the "Single Tax”, popular initiative, and proportional representation. He was a member of the American Proportional Representation League. In 1896 he said First-past-the-post voting, block voting and Cumulative Voting should be taboo among proportionalists, and that of all the P.R. methods, list PR was best suited to the U.S., except for municipalities where "single voting without transfers" (SNTV) was best.

As an advocate of labor, he spoke out to improve the working conditions of local textile factory workers and endorsed a shorter workday. As a Democrat, he was unusually successful in the Republican stronghold of the northeast.

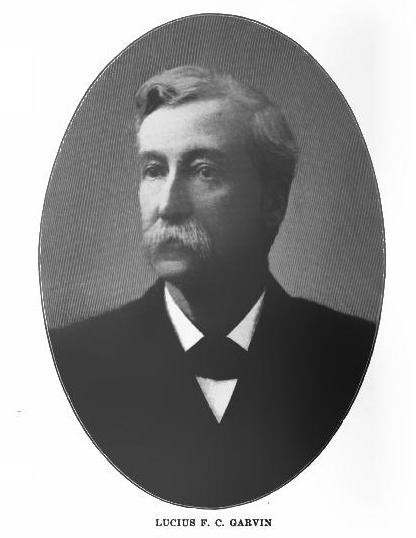
Garvin c. 1900

In 1883, Garvin was elected to the first of many terms in the Rhode Island House of Representatives. He also served several terms in the Rhode Island Senate and campaigned persistently, but without success, to represent Rhode Island's 2nd congressional district.

In 1902, Garvin was elected to the first of two consecutive terms as Governor of Rhode Island. Due to the Brayton Act of 1901, passed by the securely Republican State Senate to limit the powers of the Governor's office, Garvin was unable to make any executive, legislative, or judicial appointees. The Senate also blocked at least one of his initiatives. As governor, he shepherded a bill through the Assembly that would allow municipalities to adopt "single voting without transfer" (SNTV) but it was blocked by the state Senate. In 1902 he promised that a bill establishing Direct Legislation in Rhode Island would be debated by the Assembly.

He successfully fended off an electoral challenge from industrialist Samuel P. Colt in 1903 and was briefly discussed as a possible candidate to challenge incumbent president Theodore Roosevelt in the 1904 U.S. Presidential Election.

He became identified with anti-corruption reform and was widely quoted on the subject. In a speech to the Rhode Island General Assembly, he said: "Bribery is so common and has existed for so many years that the awful nature of the crime ceases to impress." He furnished information for Lincoln Steffens' muckraking article, "Rhode Island: A State for Sale," published in 1905 in McClure's.

== Personal life ==
In 1869, he married Dr. Lucy Waterman Southmayd (b. 1833), a recent graduate of New England Female Medical College and physician at South Hadley Ladies Seminary. They had three daughters: Ethel, Norma and Florence.

Lucy Garvin died in 1898, and in 1907, Lucius married Sarah Emma Tomlinson, a graduate of Perkins School for the Blind. They had two sons, Lucius and Sumner.

Lucius Garvin died October 2, 1922, in his office in Lonsdale. His obituary in the New York Times described him as a "picturesque figure" known throughout the state, adding that he had never owned an automobile, preferring to travel by bicycle.

Garvin was buried at Swan Point Cemetery, in Providence, Rhode Island.

Party political offices
Preceded by Nathan W. Littlefield	Democratic nominee for Governor of Rhode Island; 1901, 1902, 1903, 1904, 1905	Succeeded by James H. Higgins
Political offices
Preceded by Charles D. Kimball	Governor of Rhode Island; 1903–1905	Succeeded by George H. Utter
