= 1900 Rhode Island gubernatorial election =

- April 4, 1900
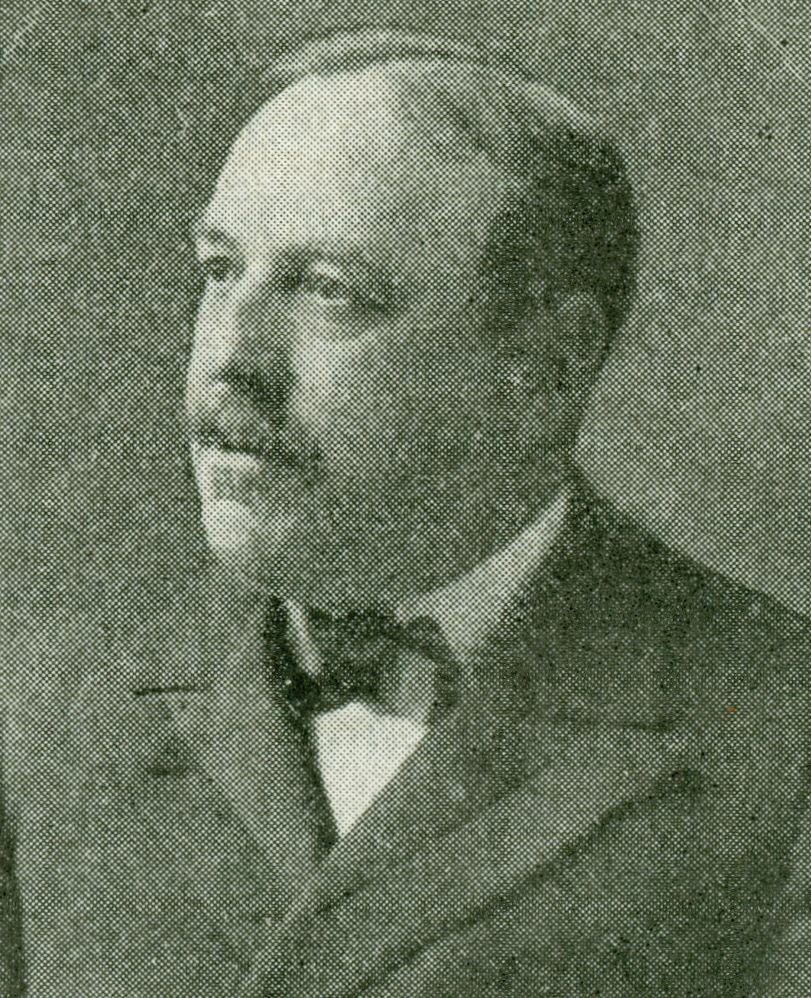

Nominee	William Gregory	Nathan W. Littlefield	James P. Reid
Party	Republican	Democratic	Socialist Labor
Popular vote	26,043	17,184	2,858
Percentage	54.33%	35.85%	5.96%
- Gregory: 40–50% 50–60% 60–70% 70–80% 80-90% Littlefield: 40–50% 50–60% 60–70%
Governor before election
Elisha Dyer Jr.
Republican
Elected Governor
William Gregory
Republican

The 1900 Rhode Island gubernatorial election was held on April 4, 1900. Republican nominee William Gregory defeated Democratic nominee Nathan W. Littlefield with 54.33% of the vote.

== General election ==
=== Candidates ===
Major party candidates

- William Gregory, Republican
- Nathan W. Littlefield, Democratic

Other candidates

- James P. Reid, Socialist Labor
- Henry B. Metcalf, Prohibition

=== Results ===
1900 Rhode Island gubernatorial election
Party	Candidate	Votes	%	±%
Republican	William Gregory	26,043	54.33%	
Democratic	Nathan W. Littlefield	17,184	35.85%	
Socialist Labor	James P. Reid	2,858	5.96%	
Prohibition	Henry B. Metcalf	1,848	3.86%	
Majority		8,859		
Turnout				
Republican hold		Swing		
