= 1904 Rhode Island gubernatorial election =

- November 8, 1904
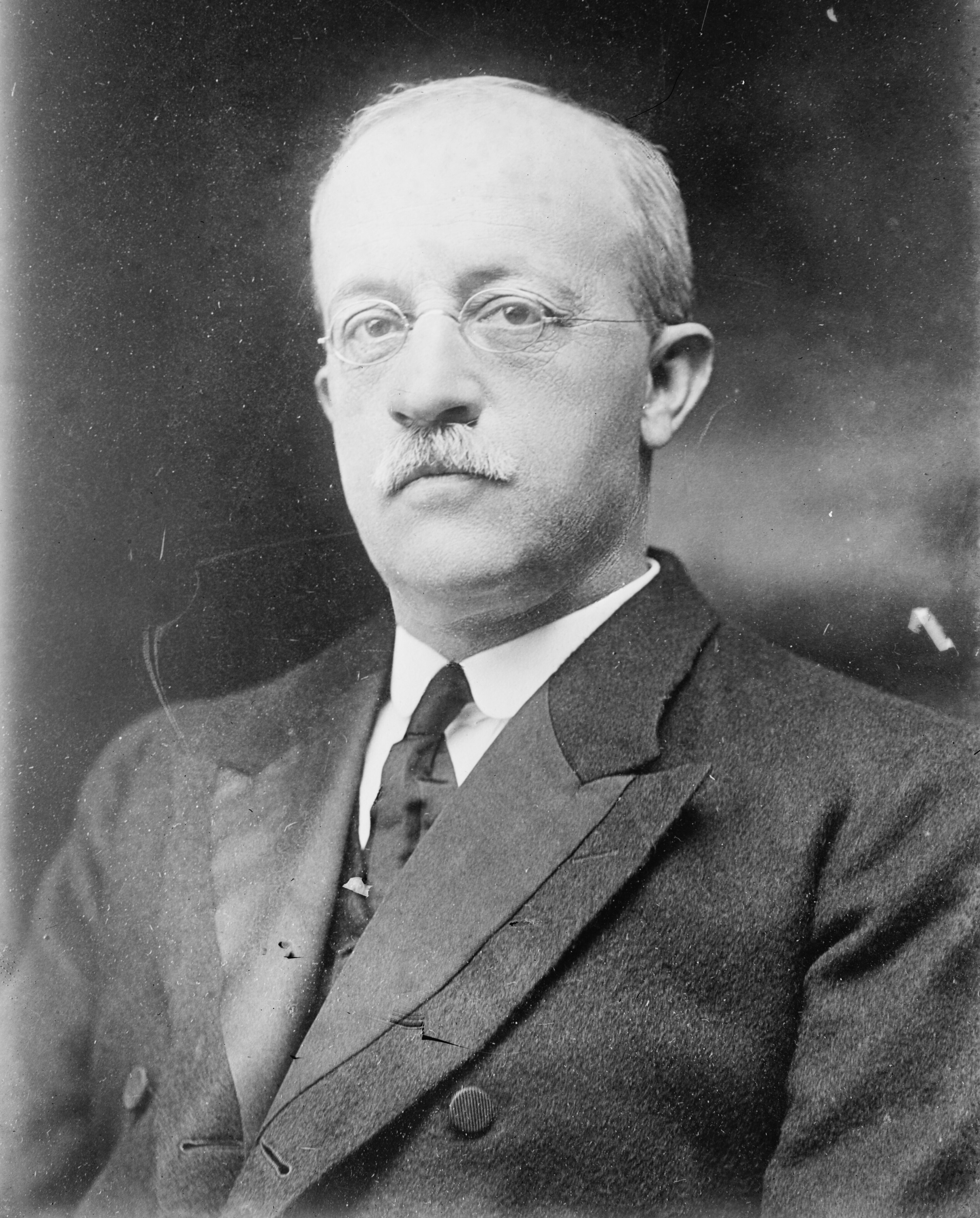

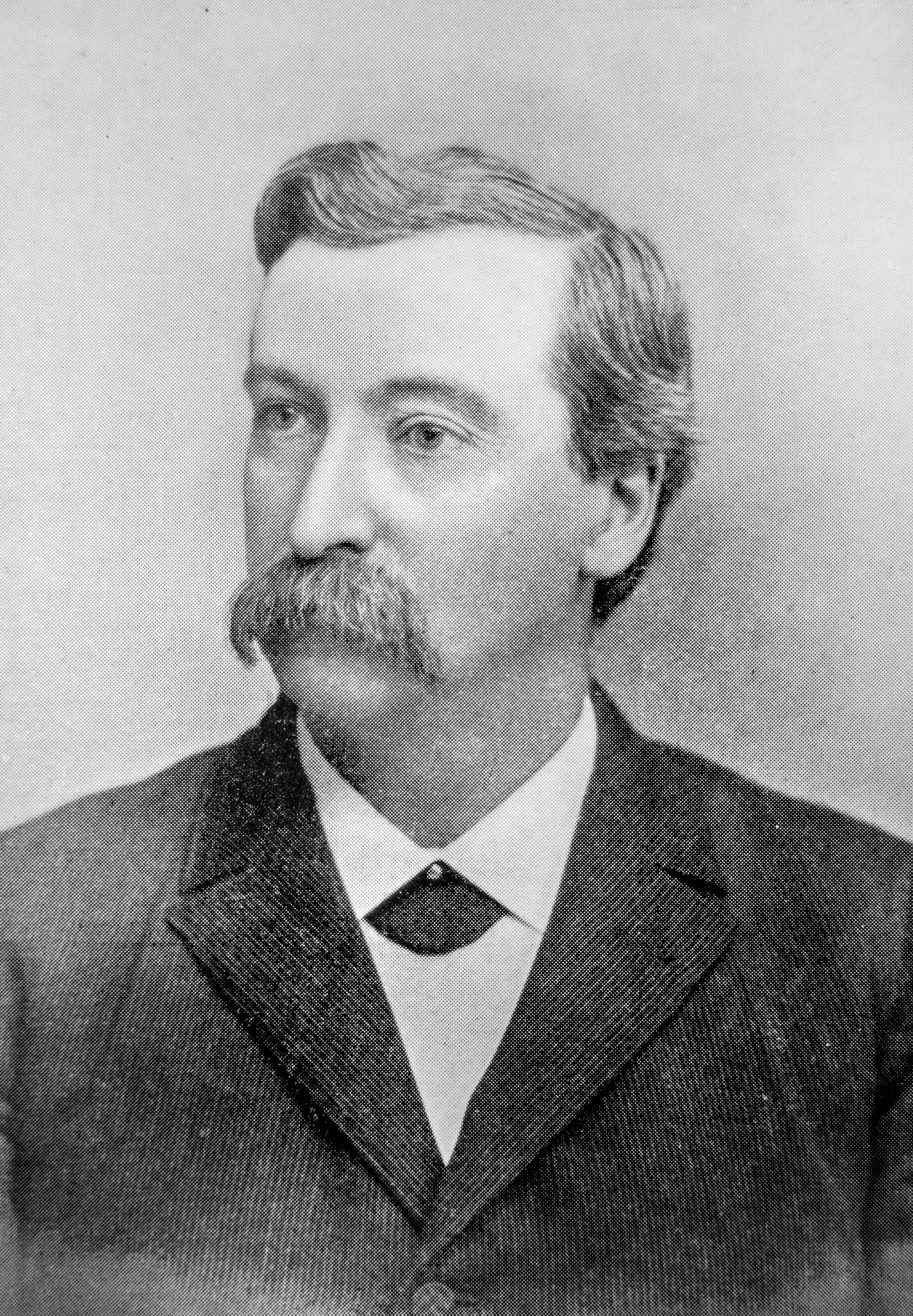
| Nominee | George H. Utter | Lucius F. C. Garvin |
| Party | Republican | Democratic |
| Popular vote | 33,821 | 32,965 |
| Percentage | 48.94% | 47.70% |
- Utter: 40–50% 50–60% 60–70% 70–80% 80-90% Garvin: 40–50% 50–60% 60–70%
Governor before election
Lucius F. C. Garvin
Democratic
Elected Governor
George H. Utter
Republican

The 1904 Rhode Island gubernatorial election was held on November 8, 1904. Republican nominee George H. Utter defeated Democratic incumbent Lucius F. C. Garvin with 48.94% of the vote.

== General election ==
=== Candidates ===
Major party candidates

- George H. Utter, Republican
- Lucius F. C. Garvin, Democratic

Other candidates

- William E. Brightman, Prohibition
- John Edward Carney, Socialist
- Peter McDermott, Socialist Labor

=== Results ===
1904 Rhode Island gubernatorial election
| Party | Candidate | Votes | % | ±% |
|---|---|---|---|---|
| Republican | George H. Utter | 33,821 | 48.94% | |
| Democratic | Lucius F. C. Garvin (incumbent) | 32,965 | 47.70% | |
| Prohibition | William E. Brightman | 1,089 | 1.58% | |
| Socialist | John Edward Carney | 743 | 1.08% | |
| Socialist Labor | Peter McDermott | 487 | 0.71% | |
| Majority | | 856 | | |
| Turnout | | | | |
| Republican gain from Democratic | | Swing | | |
