= 1905 Rhode Island gubernatorial election =

- November 7, 1905
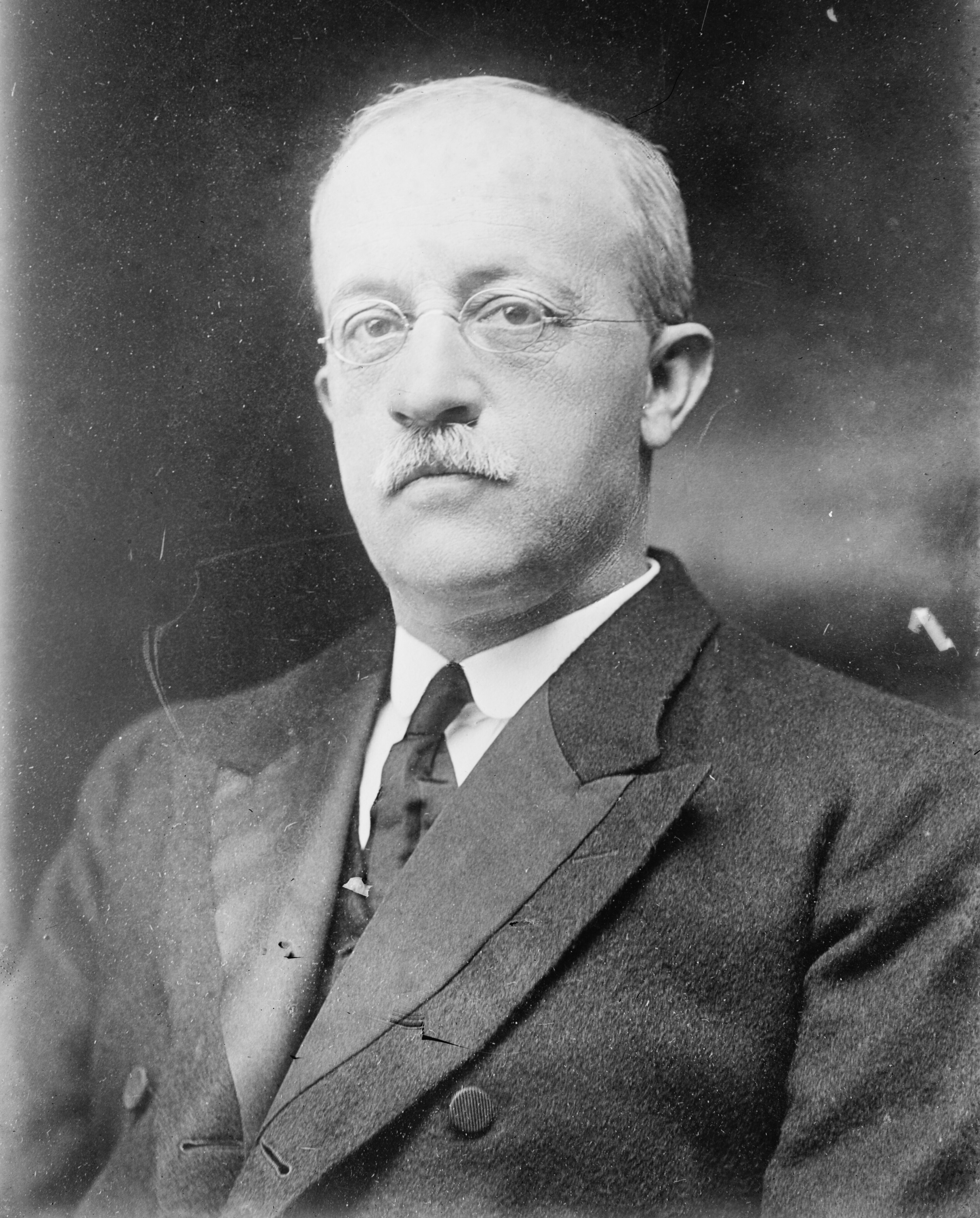

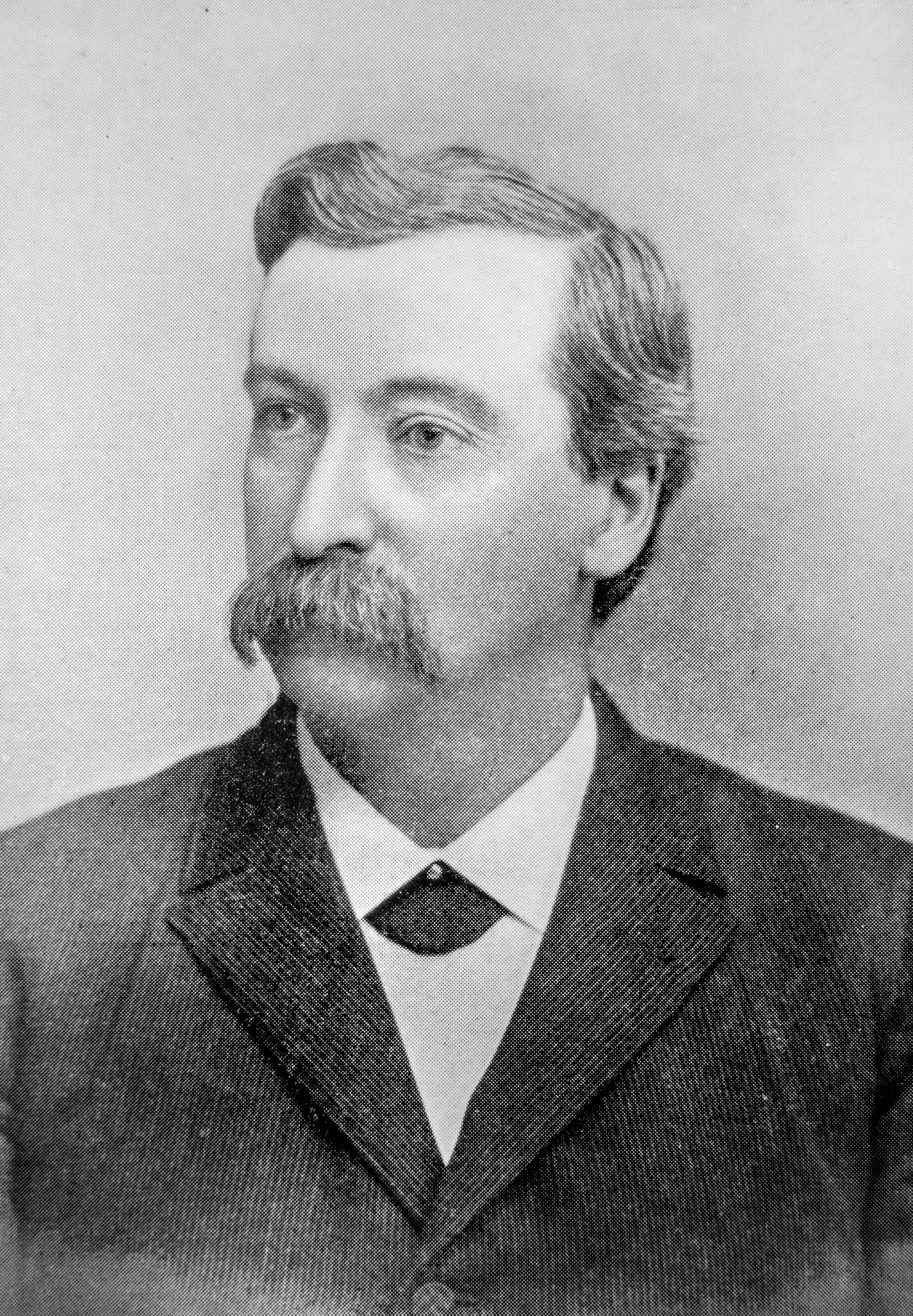
Nominee	George H. Utter	Lucius F. C. Garvin
Party	Republican	Democratic
Popular vote	31,311	25,816
Percentage	53.30%	43.95%
- Utter: 40–50% 50–60% 60–70% 70–80% 80-90% Garvin: 40–50% 50–60%
Governor before election
George H. Utter
Republican
Elected Governor
George H. Utter
Republican

The 1905 Rhode Island gubernatorial election was held on November 7, 1905. Incumbent Republican George H. Utter defeated Democratic nominee Lucius F. C. Garvin with 53.30% of the vote.

== General election ==
=== Candidates ===
Major party candidates

- George H. Utter, Republican
- Lucius F. C. Garvin, Democratic

Other candidates

- Bernan E. Helme, Prohibition
- Thomas F. Herrick, Socialist Labor
- Warren A. Carpenter, Socialist

=== Results ===
1905 Rhode Island gubernatorial election
Party	Candidate	Votes	%	±%
Republican	George H. Utter (incumbent)	31,311	53.30%	
Democratic	Lucius F. C. Garvin	25,816	43.95%	
Prohibition	Bernan E. Helme	882	1.50%	
Socialist Labor	Thomas F. Herrick	367	0.63%	
Socialist	Warren A. Carpenter	364	0.62%	
Majority		5,495		
Turnout				
Republican hold		Swing		
