= George H. Utter =

American politician (1854–1912)

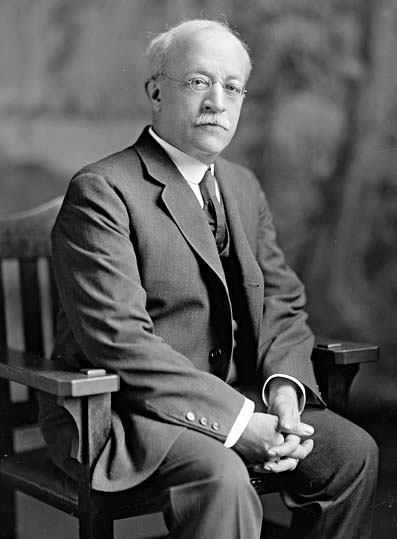
- Utter, 1905–1912

Member of the U.S. House of Representatives from Rhode Island's 2nd district
- In office March 4, 1911 – November 3, 1912
- Preceded by: Adin B. Capron
- Succeeded by: Peter G. Gerry

49th Governor of Rhode Island
- In office January 3, 1905 – January 1, 1907
- Lieutenant: Frederick Jackson
- Preceded by: Lucius F. C. Garvin
- Succeeded by: James H. Higgins

Lieutenant Governor of Rhode Island
- In office 1904–1905
- Governor: Lucius F. C. Garvin
- Preceded by: Adelard Archambault
- Succeeded by: Frederick Jackson

Secretary of State of Rhode Island
- In office 1891–1894
- Governor: Herbert W. Ladd; D. Russell Brown
- Preceded by: Edwin D. McGuinness
- Succeeded by: Charles P. Bennett

Member of the Rhode Island House of Representatives
- In office 1885–1889

Personal details
- Born: July 24, 1854 Plainfield, New Jersey, U.S.
- Died: November 3, 1912 (aged 58) Westerly, Rhode Island, U.S.
- Party: Republican
- Spouse: Elizabeth Lovina Brown
- Education: Amherst College

George Herbert Utter (July 24, 1854 – November 3, 1912) was a U.S. representative from Rhode Island and the 49th governor of Rhode Island.

== Biography ==
Born in Plainfield, New Jersey, Utter moved with his parents to Westerly, Rhode Island, in 1861. He attended the public schools of Westerly and Alfred (New York) Academy. He graduated from Amherst College, Massachusetts, in 1877. He was engaged as a printer and publisher of the Westerly Sun before serving as a personal aide on the staff of Governor Augustus O. Bourn 1883–1885.

He served as member of the Rhode Island House of Representatives 1885–1889, serving as speaker the last year. Utter served as Secretary of State of Rhode Island (1891–1894), and as Lieutenant Governor (1904) and Governor (1905–06) of Rhode Island. In 1907 he was elected as an honorary member of the Rhode Island Society of the Cincinnati.

Utter was elected as a Republican to the Sixty-second Congress and served from March 4, 1911, until his death from liver cancer in Westerly, Rhode Island, November 3, 1912. At the time of his death, Utter was running for re-election to Congress.

He died on November 3, 1912, in Westerly, Rhode Island. He was interred in Riverbend Cemetery, Westerly, Rhode Island.

== See also ==
- List of members of the United States Congress who died in office (1900–1949)

Party political offices
| Preceded by Samuel P. Colt | Republican nominee for Governor of Rhode Island; 1904, 1905, 1906 | Succeeded by Frederick H. Jackson |
Political offices
| Preceded by Edwin D. McGuinness | Secretary of State of Rhode Island; 1891–1894 | Succeeded by Charles P. Bennett |
| Preceded by Adelard Archambault | Lieutenant Governor of Rhode Island; 1904–1905 | Succeeded by Frederick Jackson |
| Preceded by Lucius F. C. Garvin | Governor of Rhode Island; 1905–1906 | Succeeded by James H. Higgins |
U.S. House of Representatives
| Preceded by Adin B. Capron | Member of the U.S. House of Representatives from Rhode Island's 2nd congressional district 1911–1912 | Succeeded by Peter G. Gerry |
