= Frederick H. Jackson (Rhode Island politician) =

American politician (1847–1915)

39th Lieutenant Governor of Rhode Island
- In office 1905–1908
- Preceded by: George H. Utter
- Succeeded by: Ralph Watrous

Personal details
- Born: October 9, 1847 Kirkland, New York, U.S.
- Died: 1915 (aged 67–68)
- Party: Republican
- Spouse: Annie Blanchard Ellis (m. 1874)
- Parent(s): Frederick J. Jackson; Hannah M. Jackson
- Education: Cornell University
- Profession: Politician, businessman

Frederick H. Jackson (October 9, 1847 – 1915) was an American businessman and politician, who served as the lieutenant governor of Rhode Island from 1905 to 1908.

== Biography ==
Jackson was born in Kirkland, New York to the Rev. Frederick J. Jackson and Hannah M. Jackson. He graduated from Cornell University in 1873 and worked in the insurance industry.

He married Annie Blanchard Ellis in 1874, and their children included Frederick Ellis Jackson, principal of the Providence architectural firm, Jackson, Robertson & Adams.

He was a deacon of the Central Congregational Church in Providence, Rhode Island.

Party political offices
Preceded by George H. Utter	Republican nominee for Governor of Rhode Island; 1907	Succeeded by Aram J. Pothier
