= Samuel P. Colt =

US industrialist and politician

Samuel Pomeroy Colt
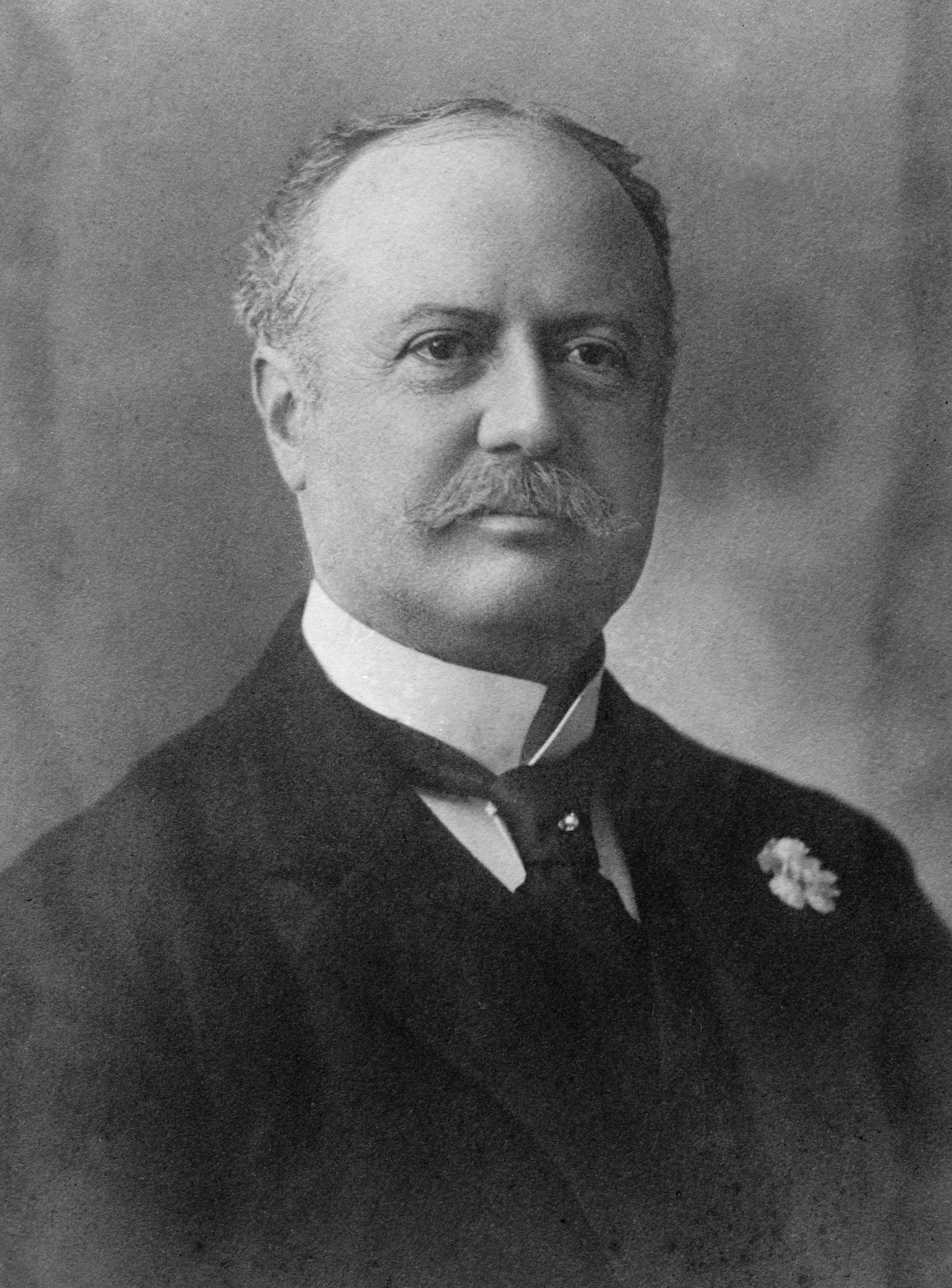

Attorney General of Rhode Island
- In office May 1882 – May 1886
- Governor: Alfred H. Littlefield, Augustus O. Bourn, George P. Wetmore
- Preceded by: Willard Sayles
- Succeeded by: Edwin Metcalf

Personal details
- Born: January 10, 1852 Paterson, New Jersey, U.S.
- Died: August 13, 1921 (aged 69) Linden Place, Bristol, Rhode Island, U.S.
- Resting place: Juniper Hill Cemetery, Bristol, Rhode Island
- Party: Republican
- Spouse: Elizabeth Bullock
- Parent(s): Christopher Colt and Theodora Goujand DeWolf Colt
- Relatives: Samuel Colt
- Education: Columbia Law School
- Occupation: Industrialist and politician
- Known for: Founded Industrial Trust Company and United States Rubber Company

Samuel Pomeroy Colt (January 10, 1852 – August 13, 1921) was an industrialist and politician from Rhode Island. He formed the United States Rubber Company, later called Uniroyal, the largest rubber company in the nation.

== Early life and education ==
Samuel P. Colt was born in Paterson, New Jersey, on January 10, 1852, the youngest of six children born to Christopher Colt (brother to arms maker Samuel Colt) and Theodora Goujand DeWolf Colt of Bristol, Rhode Island. His mother was a member of the large and wealthy DeWolf family, many of whom had profited from the slave trade and related businesses. Colt's friends and family called him "Pom".

In 1875, at the age of 23, he was appointed military aide-de-camp to Rhode Island Governor Henry Lippitt and commissioned a colonel in the Rhode Island Militia. Colt would use this title for the remainder of his life.

In 1876, he was graduated from Columbia Law School.

== Career and family ==
In 1876, at age 24, Colt was elected to represent Bristol in the Rhode Island House of Representatives. He became involved in efforts to regulate child labor and advance women's property rights. He left the legislature in 1879 when appointed Assistant Attorney General for Rhode Island. In 1881 Colt was elected Attorney General of Rhode Island and was re-elected to three one-year terms. He served in office from May 1882 to May 1886.

In 1881, Colt married Elizabeth Bullock, also of Bristol and daughter of J. Russell Bullock. The marriage produced three sons: Samuel Pomeroy, Jr. (1881–1890), Russell Griswold (1882–1960), and Roswell Christopher (1889–1935). Samuel and Elizabeth separated in 1896, and neither remarried. Russell G. Colt married actress Ethel Barrymore.

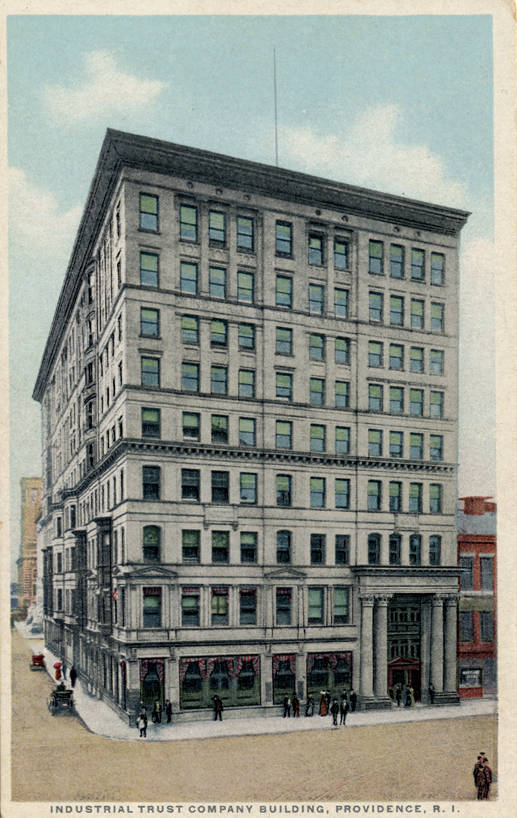

In 1886, Colt founded the Industrial Trust Company, a financial organization; he served as its president until 1908. Later, it became Industrial National Bank, then Fleet Bank, and was ultimately merged into Bank of America.

In 1887, Colt was appointed as a receiver for the bankrupt National Rubber Company, based in Bristol. He reorganized the company and reopened it in 1888 as the National India Rubber Company. In 1892, he merged it with several other companies he had acquired to form the United States Rubber Company. Later called Uniroyal, it became the largest producer of rubber goods in the world. In 1901, Colt became president of the company, serving until 1918, when he was appointed Chairman of the Board of Trustees.

He was one of the founders of the Rhode Island Society of the Sons of the Revolution in 1896. The following year, he helped found the Rhode Island Society of Colonial Wars, and was assigned state society membership number 1.

In 1903, he ran for governor of Rhode Island as a Republican, but failed to unseat the incumbent Lucius Garvin.

In 1905, believing that incumbent Republican Senator George P. Wetmore was not going to stand for reelection, Colt announced his candidacy. Wetmore eventually decided to run. The ensuing contest between Colt, Wetmore and Democrat Robert Hale Ives Goddard resulted in 81 deadlocked ballots cast by the General Assembly over four months in 1907 and a vacant seat in Rhode Island's delegation to the 60th Congress. In the end, Colt stepped down, possibly due to ill health. Wetmore was reelected to belatedly join the 60th Congress in January 1908. (Colt's older brother, LeBaron B. Colt, would win this seat in 1913.)

Colt died August 13, 1921, of complications from a stroke at Linden Place, the family home in Bristol. A farm owned by Colt was later purchased by the state of Rhode Island and transformed into Colt State Park.

== Legacy and honors ==
- Colt's home Linden Place is now a historic house museum.

Party political offices
Preceded by Charles D. Kimball	Republican nominee for Governor of Rhode Island; 1903	Succeeded by George H. Utter
Legal offices
Preceded by Willard Sayles	Attorney General of Rhode Island; 1882–1886	Succeeded by Edwin Metcalf
