= 1902 Rhode Island gubernatorial election =

- November 4, 1902
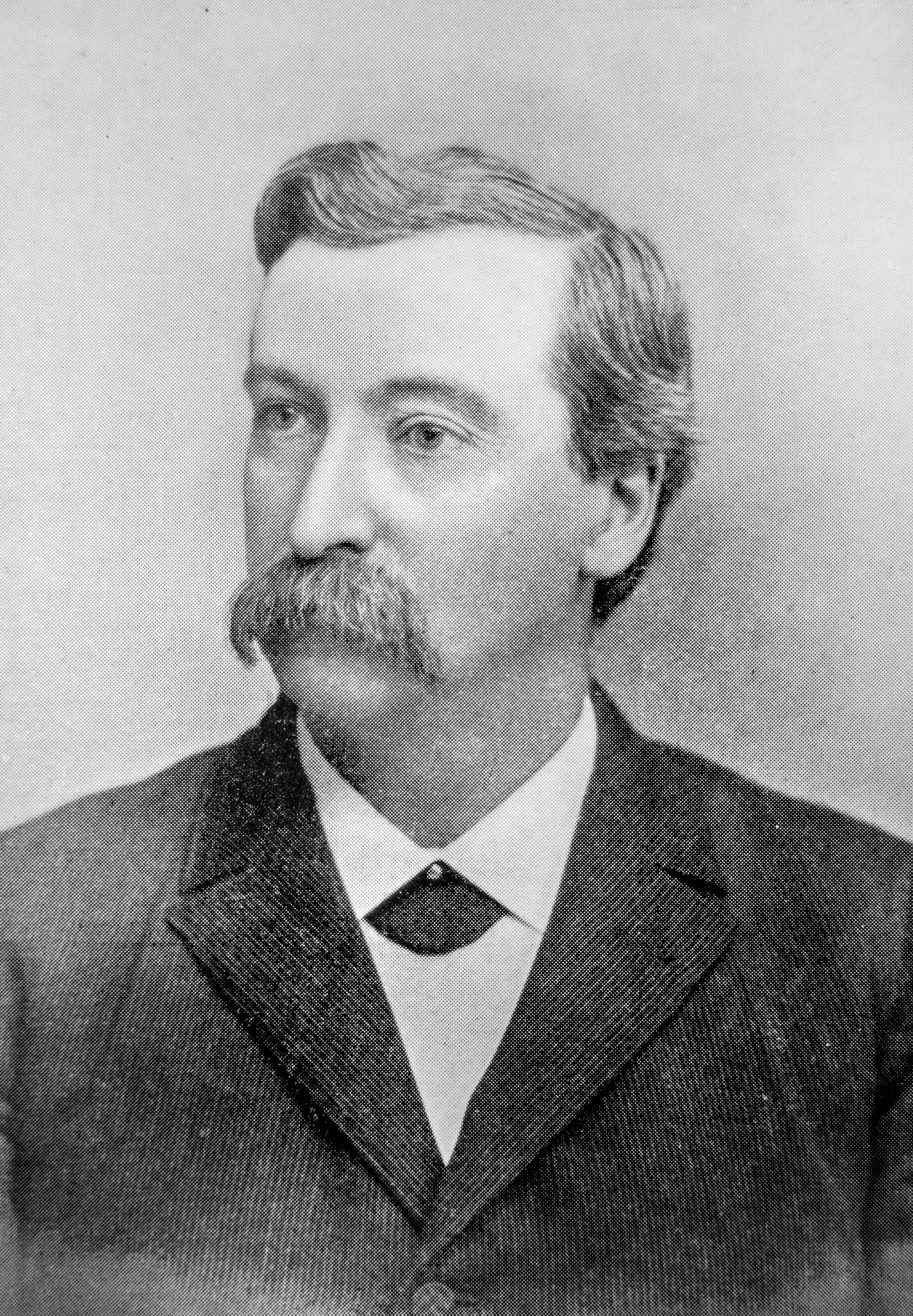

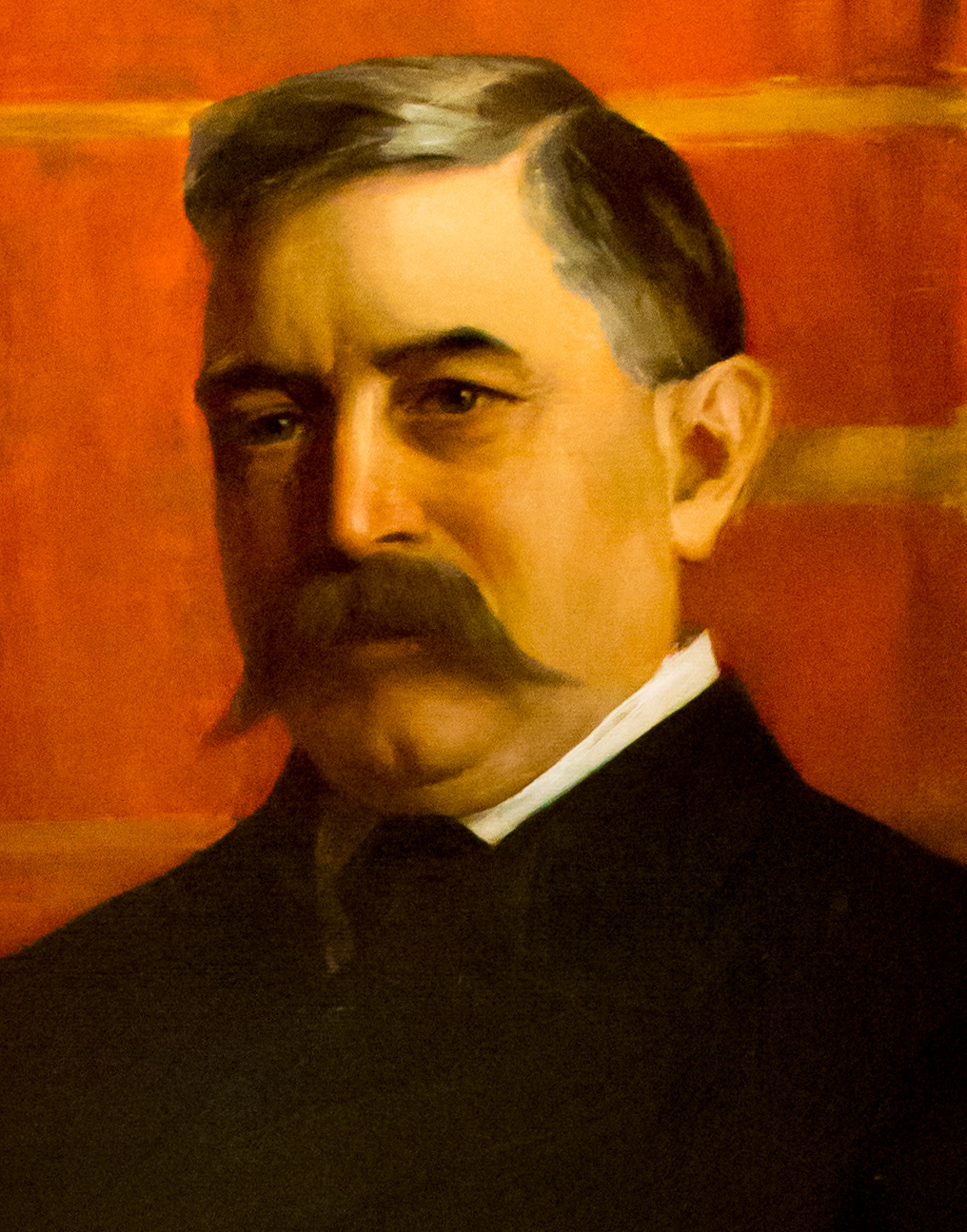
Nominee	Lucius F. C. Garvin	Charles D. Kimball
Party	Democratic	Republican
Popular vote	32,279	24,541
Percentage	53.99%	41.04%
- Garvin: 40–50% 50–60% 60–70% 70–80% Kimball: 40–50% 50–60% 60–70% 70–80% 80-90%
Governor before election
Charles D. Kimball
Republican
Elected Governor
Lucius F. C. Garvin
Democratic

The 1902 Rhode Island gubernatorial election was held on November 4, 1902. Democratic nominee Lucius F. C. Garvin defeated incumbent Republican Charles D. Kimball with 53.99% of the vote.

== General election ==
=== Candidates ===
Major party candidates

- Lucius F. C. Garvin, Democratic
- Charles D. Kimball, Republican

Other candidates

- William E. Brightman, Prohibition
- Peter McDermott, Socialist Labor

=== Results ===
1902 Rhode Island gubernatorial election
Party	Candidate	Votes	%	±%
Democratic	Lucius F. C. Garvin	32,279	53.99%	
Republican	Charles D. Kimball (incumbent)	24,541	41.04%	
Prohibition	William E. Brightman	1,689	2.83%	
Socialist Labor	Peter McDermott	1,283	2.15%	
Majority		7,738		
Turnout				
Democratic gain from Republican		Swing		
