= Edwin Metcalf =

American politician

Attorney General of Rhode Island
- In office 1886–1886
- Governor: George P. Wetmore
- Preceded by: Samuel P. Colt
- Succeeded by: Ziba O. Slocum

Speaker of the Rhode Island House of Representatives
- In office 1873–1874
- Preceded by: Charles C. Van Zandt
- Succeeded by: Edward L. Freeman

Rhode Island Senate
- In office 1875–1876

Personal details
- Born: Edwin Metcalf; August 24, 1823
- Died: January 18, 1894 (aged 70) Providence, Rhode Island
- Education: Harvard College (BA)

Edwin Metcalf (August 24. 1823 - January 18, 1894) was an American politician who served as the Attorney General of Rhode Island from 1886 to 1886 and as speaker of the Rhode Island House of Representatives. He was also the first commander of the 11th Rhode Island Infantry Regiment during the American Civil War.
