= Charles D. Kimball =

American politician

Charles Dean Kimball
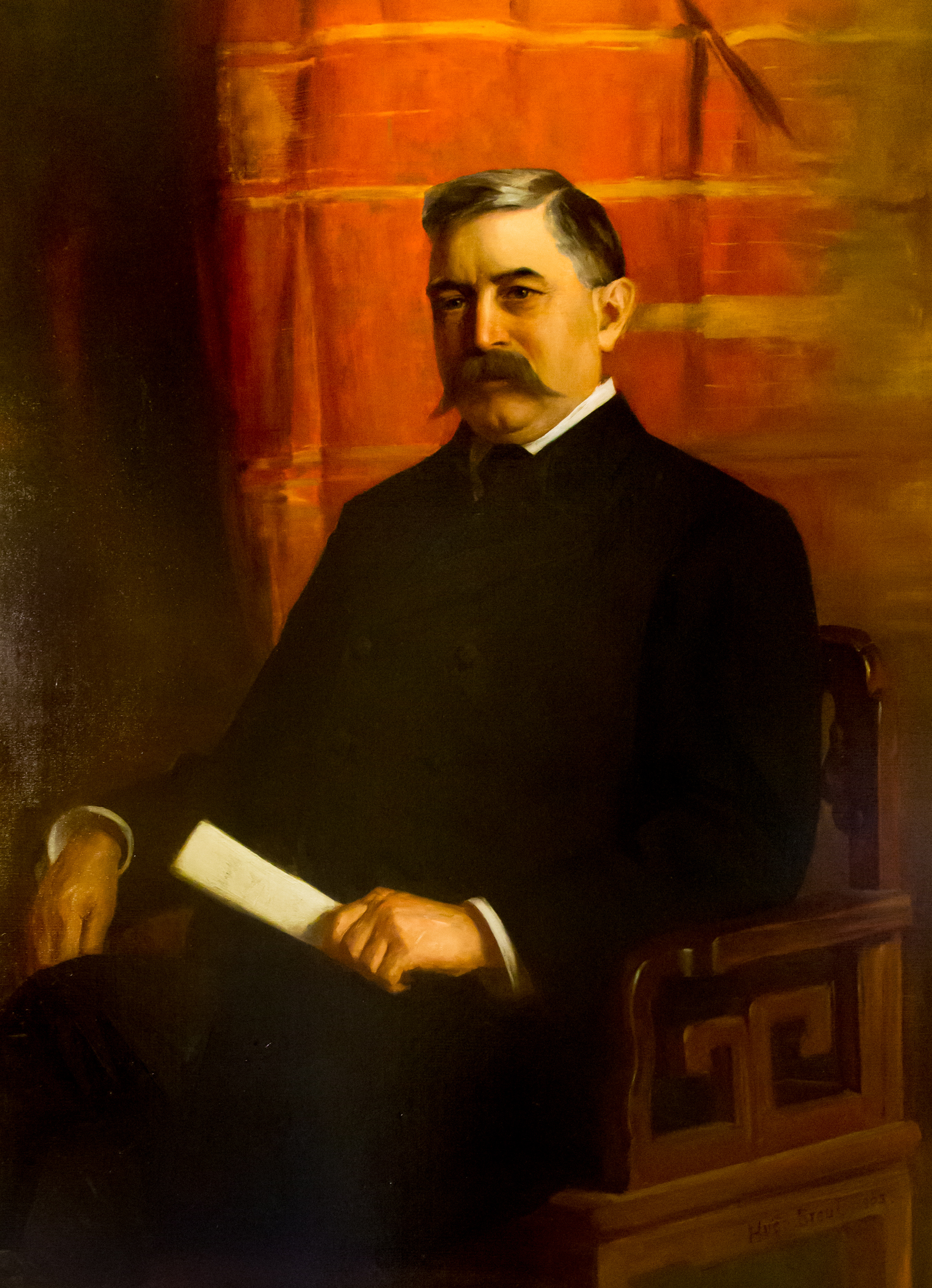

47th Governor of Rhode Island
- In office December 16, 1901 – January 3, 1903
- Lieutenant: George L. Shepley
- Preceded by: William Gregory
- Succeeded by: Lucius F. C. Garvin

Lieutenant Governor of Rhode Island
- In office May 29, 1900 – December 16, 1901
- Governor: William Gregory
- Preceded by: William Gregory
- Succeeded by: George L. Shepley

Member of the Rhode Island House of Representatives
- In office 1894–1899

Personal details
- Born: September 13, 1859 Providence, Rhode Island, U.S.
- Died: December 8, 1930 (aged 71)
- Resting place: Swan Point Cemetery
- Party: Republican
- Spouse: Gertrude Greenalgh

Charles Dean Kimball (September 13, 1859 – December 8, 1930) was an American politician and the 47th governor of Rhode Island.

== Early life ==
Kimball was born in Providence, Rhode Island, on September 13, 1859, as the son of Emery S. Kimball and Mary C. (Briggs) Kimball. He married Gertrude C. Greenalgh November 24, 1885. After school education, he made his career in business.

== Political career ==
Kimball was a member of Rhode Island House of Representatives 1894-99 and Lieutenant Governor of Rhode Island 1900-01. He became governor of Rhode Island after the death of incumbent governor William Gregory. He held the governor's office from December 16, 1901, to January 3, 1903. Kimball worked for changes in the State constitution to give the governor veto powers and change state elections from an annual to a biennial basis, both of which were eventually achieved.

During Kimball's term, the beginning of the term of office for the state's general officers was changed from the last Tuesday in May to the first Tuesday in January.

Kimball was an active member of the Freemasons.

In 1904, he joined the Rhode Island Society of the Sons of the American Revolution and served as the Society's president from 1911 to 1912. He was also a member of the Rhode Island Society of Colonial Wars. In 1925, he was admitted as an honorary member of the Rhode Island Society of the Cincinnati.

During World War I he served as Chairman of the Draft Board for Division 1 in Rhode Island.

Governor Kimball died on December 8, 1930. Interment at Swan Point Cemetery, Providence, Rhode Island.

== Sources ==
- Sobel, Robert and John Raimo. Biographical Directory of the Governors of the United States, 1789-1978. Greenwood Press, 1988. ISBN 0-313-28093-2

Party political offices
Preceded by William Gregory	Republican nominee for Governor of Rhode Island; 1902	Succeeded by Samuel P. Colt
Political offices
Preceded by William Gregory	Lieutenant Governor of Rhode Island; 1900–1901	Succeeded by George L. Shepley
Preceded by William Gregory	Governor of Rhode Island; 1901–1903	Succeeded by Lucius F. C. Garvin
