= 1906 Rhode Island gubernatorial election =

- November 6, 1906
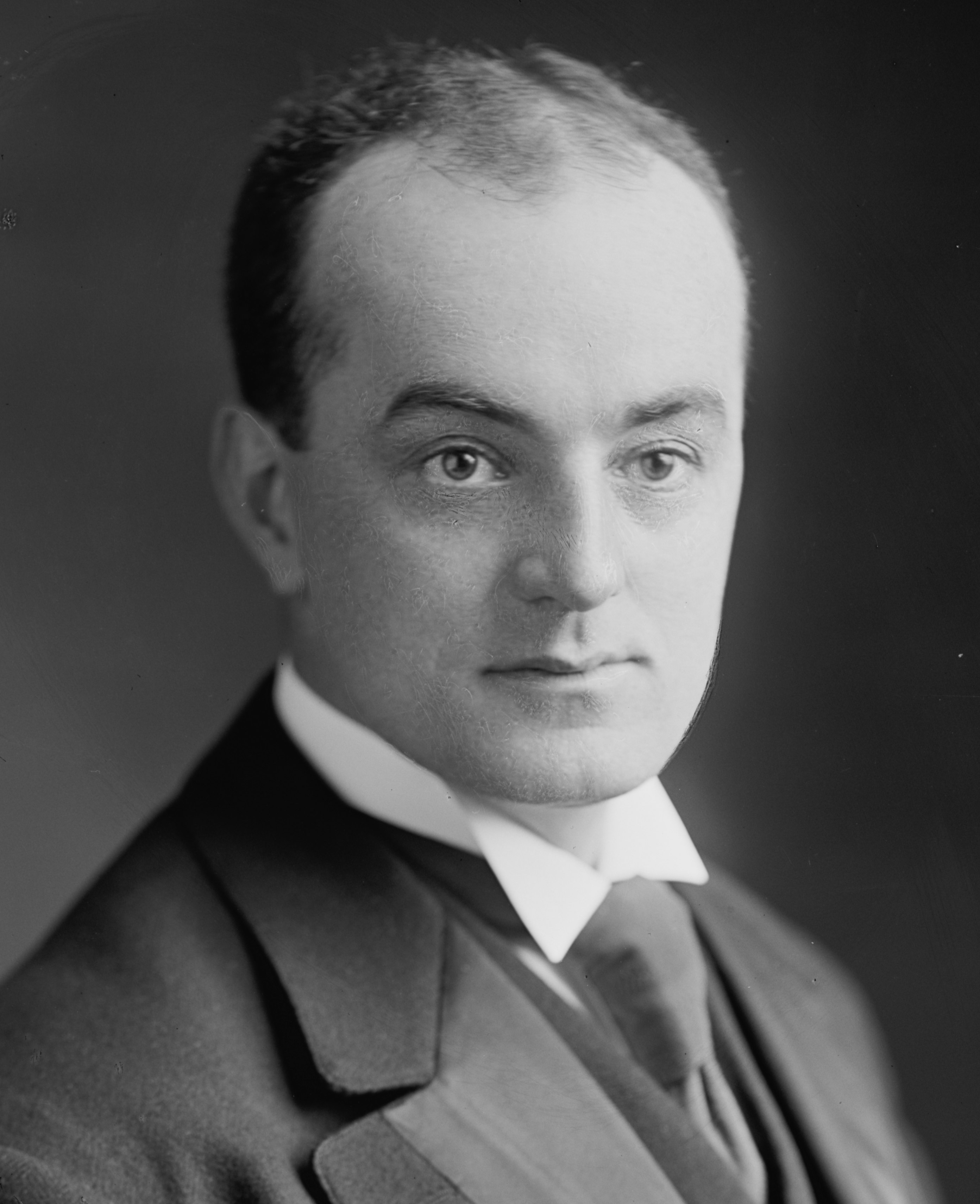

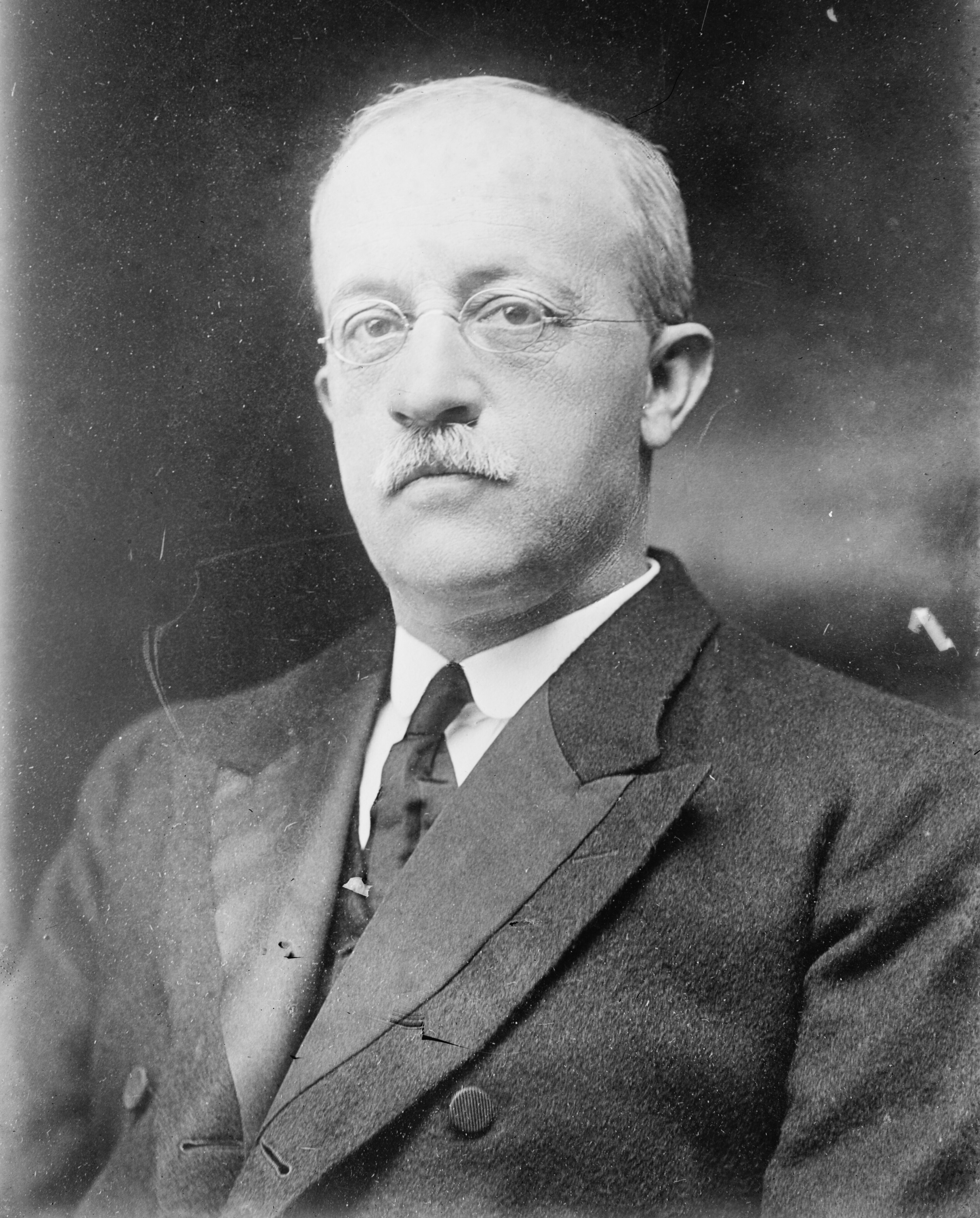
Nominee	James H. Higgins	George H. Utter
Party	Democratic	Republican
Popular vote	33,195	31,877
Percentage	49.92%	47.94%
- Higgins: 40–50% 50–60% Utter: 40–50% 50–60% 60–70% 70–80% 80-90%
Governor before election
George H. Utter
Republican
Elected Governor
James H. Higgins
Democratic

The 1906 Rhode Island gubernatorial election was held on November 6, 1906. Democratic nominee James H. Higgins defeated incumbent Republican George H. Utter with 49.92% of the vote.

== General election ==
=== Candidates ===
Major party candidates

- James H. Higgins, Democratic
- George H. Utter, Republican

Other candidates

- Bernan E. Helme, Prohibition
- Warren A. Carpenter, Socialist
- David J. Moran, Socialist Labor

=== Results ===
1906 Rhode Island gubernatorial election
Party	Candidate	Votes	%	±%
Democratic	James H. Higgins	33,195	49.92%	
Republican	George H. Utter (incumbent)	31,877	47.94%	
Prohibition	Bernan E. Helme	714	1.07%	
Socialist	Warren A. Carpenter	395	0.59%	
Socialist Labor	David J. Moran	320	0.48%	
Majority		1,318		
Turnout				
Democratic gain from Republican		Swing		
