= 1903 Rhode Island gubernatorial election =

- November 3, 1903
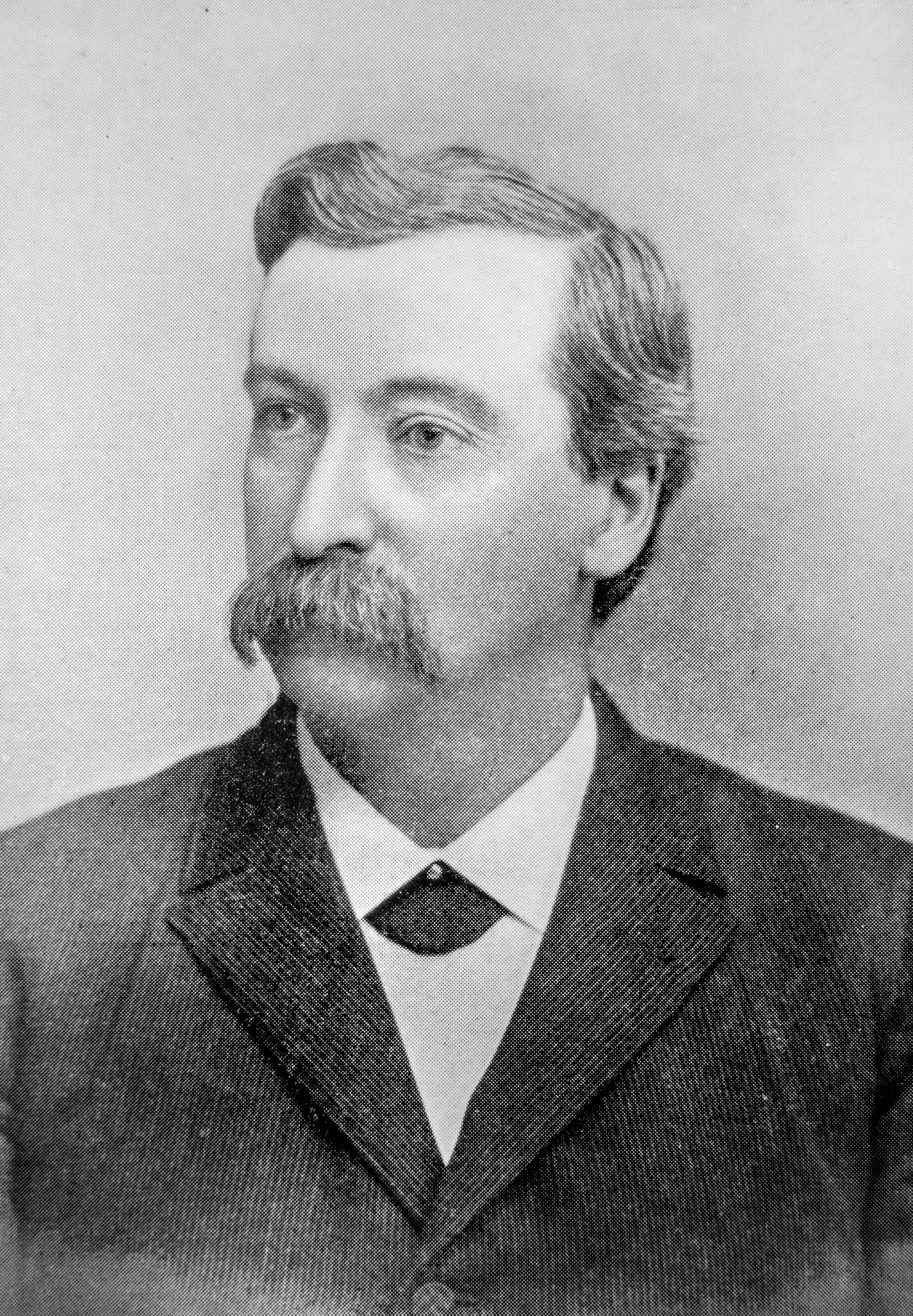

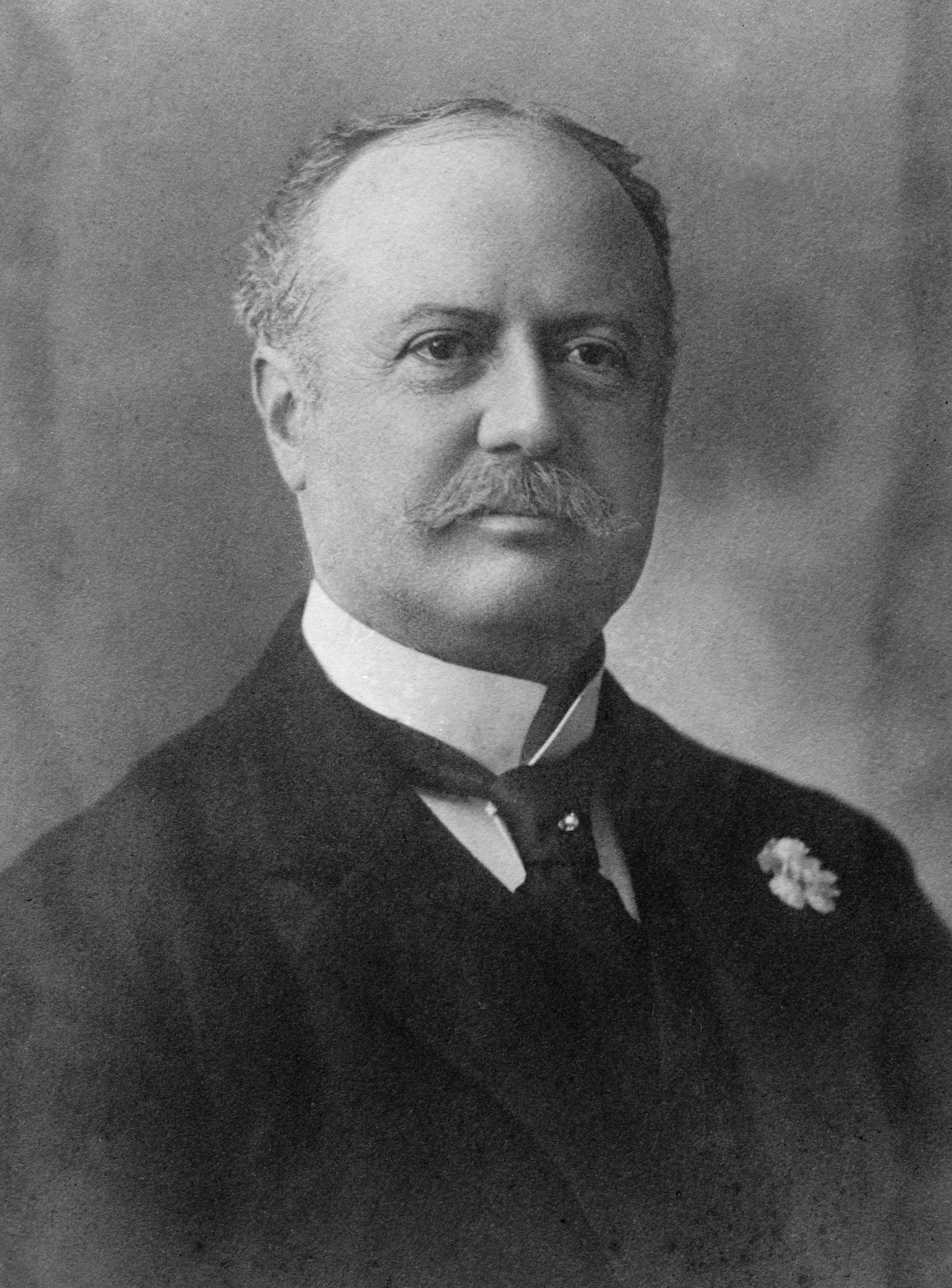
Nominee	Lucius F. C. Garvin	Samuel Pomeroy Colt
Party	Democratic	Republican
Popular vote	30,578	29,275
Percentage	49.29%	47.19%
- Garvin: 40–50% 50–60% 60–70% Colt: 40–50% 50–60% 60–70% 70–80% 80-90%
Governor before election
Lucius F. C. Garvin
Democratic
Elected Governor
Lucius F. C. Garvin
Democratic

The 1903 Rhode Island gubernatorial election was held on November 3, 1903. Incumbent Democrat Lucius F. C. Garvin defeated Republican nominee Samuel Pomeroy Colt with 49.29% of the vote.

== General election ==
=== Candidates ===
Major party candidates

- Lucius F. C. Garvin, Democratic
- Samuel Pomeroy Colt, Republican

Other candidates

- William O. Angilly, Socialist Labor
- Frederick T. Jencks, Prohibition
- James E. Furlong, Socialist

=== Results ===
1903 Rhode Island gubernatorial election
Party	Candidate	Votes	%	±%
Democratic	Lucius F. C. Garvin (incumbent)	30,578	49.29%	
Republican	Samuel Pomeroy Colt	29,275	47.19%	
Socialist Labor	William O. Angilly	943	1.52%	
Prohibition	Frederick T. Jencks	936	1.51%	
Socialist	James E. Furlong	303	0.49%	
Majority		1,303		
Turnout				
Democratic hold		Swing		
