= 1907 Rhode Island gubernatorial election =

- November 5, 1907
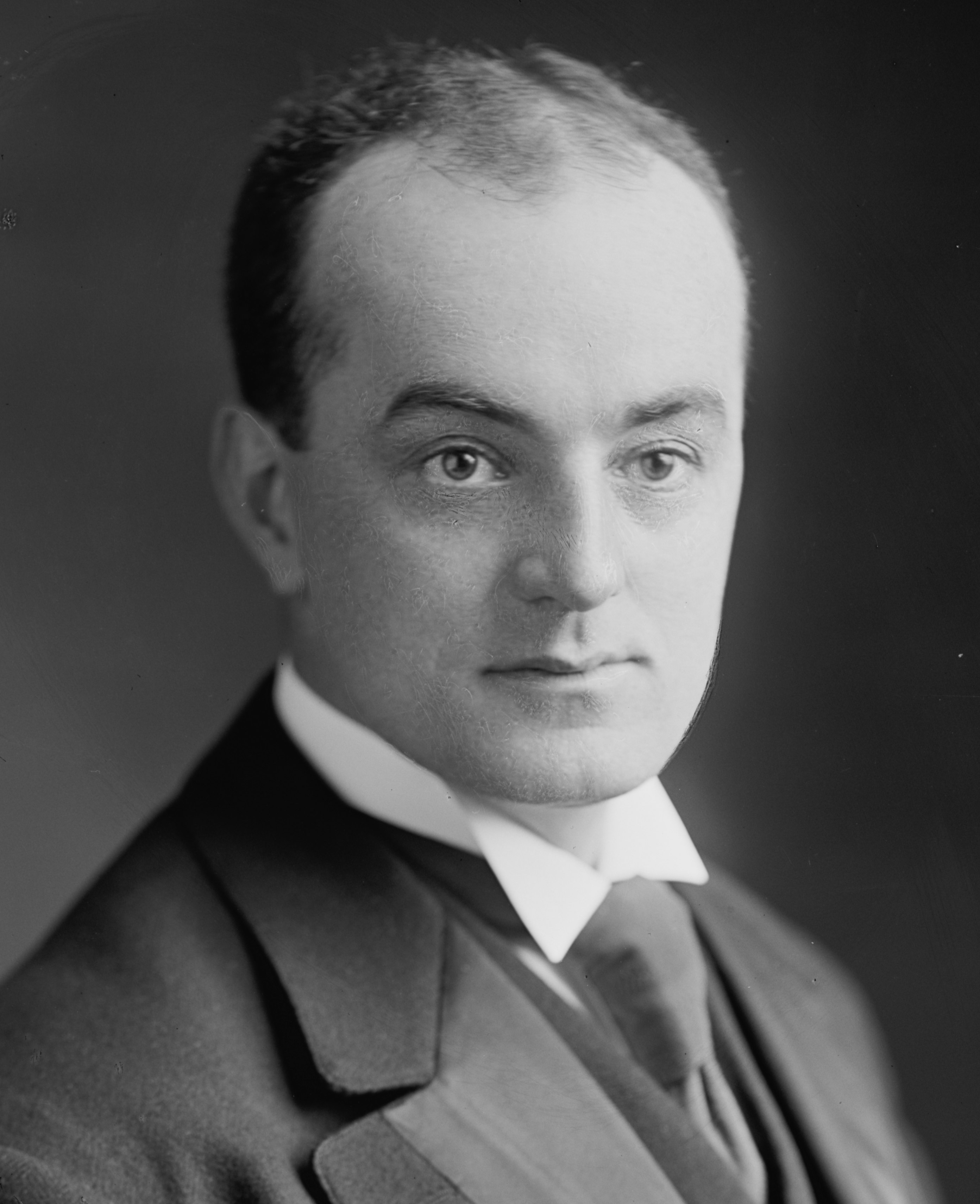

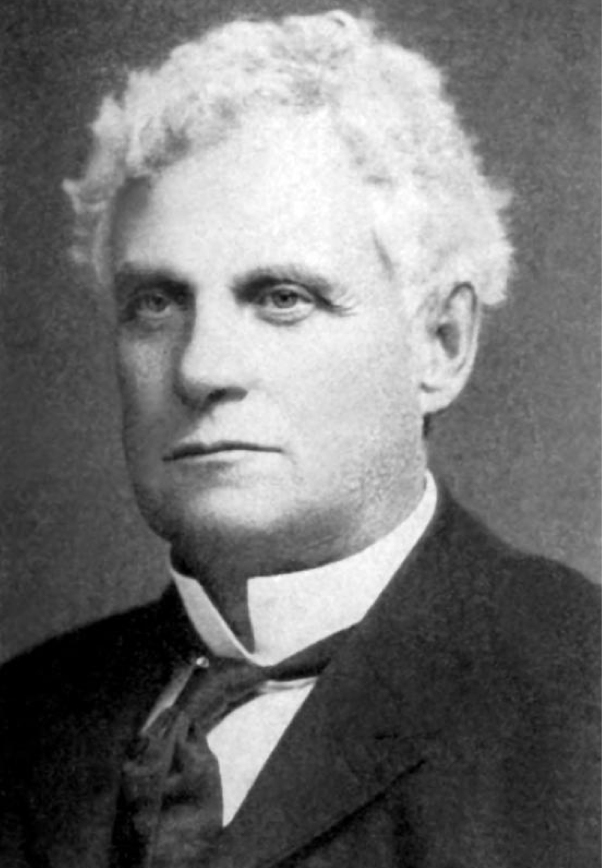
Nominee	James H. Higgins	Frederick H. Jackson
Party	Democratic	Republican
Popular vote	33,300	31,005
Percentage	50.37%	46.90%
- County results Higgins: 50–60% Jackson: 50–60% 60–70%
Governor before election
James H. Higgins
Democratic
Elected Governor
James H. Higgins
Democratic

The 1907 Rhode Island gubernatorial election was held on November 5, 1907. Incumbent Democrat James H. Higgins defeated Republican nominee Frederick H. Jackson with 50.37% of the vote.

== General election ==
=== Candidates ===
Major party candidates

- James H. Higgins, Republican
- Frederick H. Jackson, Democratic

Other candidates

- Louis E. Remington, Prohibition
- William H. Johnston, Socialist
- John W. Leach, Socialist Labor

=== Results ===
1907 Rhode Island gubernatorial election
Party	Candidate	Votes	%	±%
Democratic	James H. Higgins (incumbent)	33,300	50.37%	
Republican	Frederick H. Jackson	31,005	46.90%	
Prohibition	Louis E. Remington	831	1.26%	
Socialist	William H. Johnston	681	1.03%	
Socialist Labor	John W. Leach	289	0.44%	
Majority		2,295		
Turnout				
Democratic hold		Swing		
