= 1901 Rhode Island gubernatorial election =

- November 5, 1901
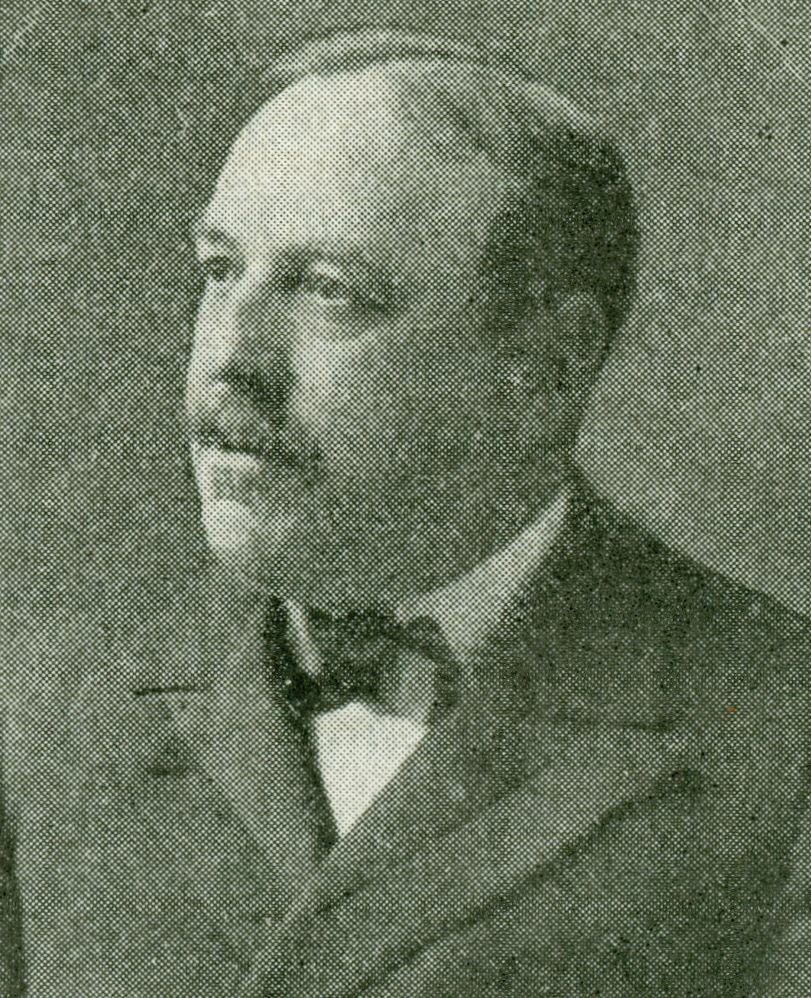

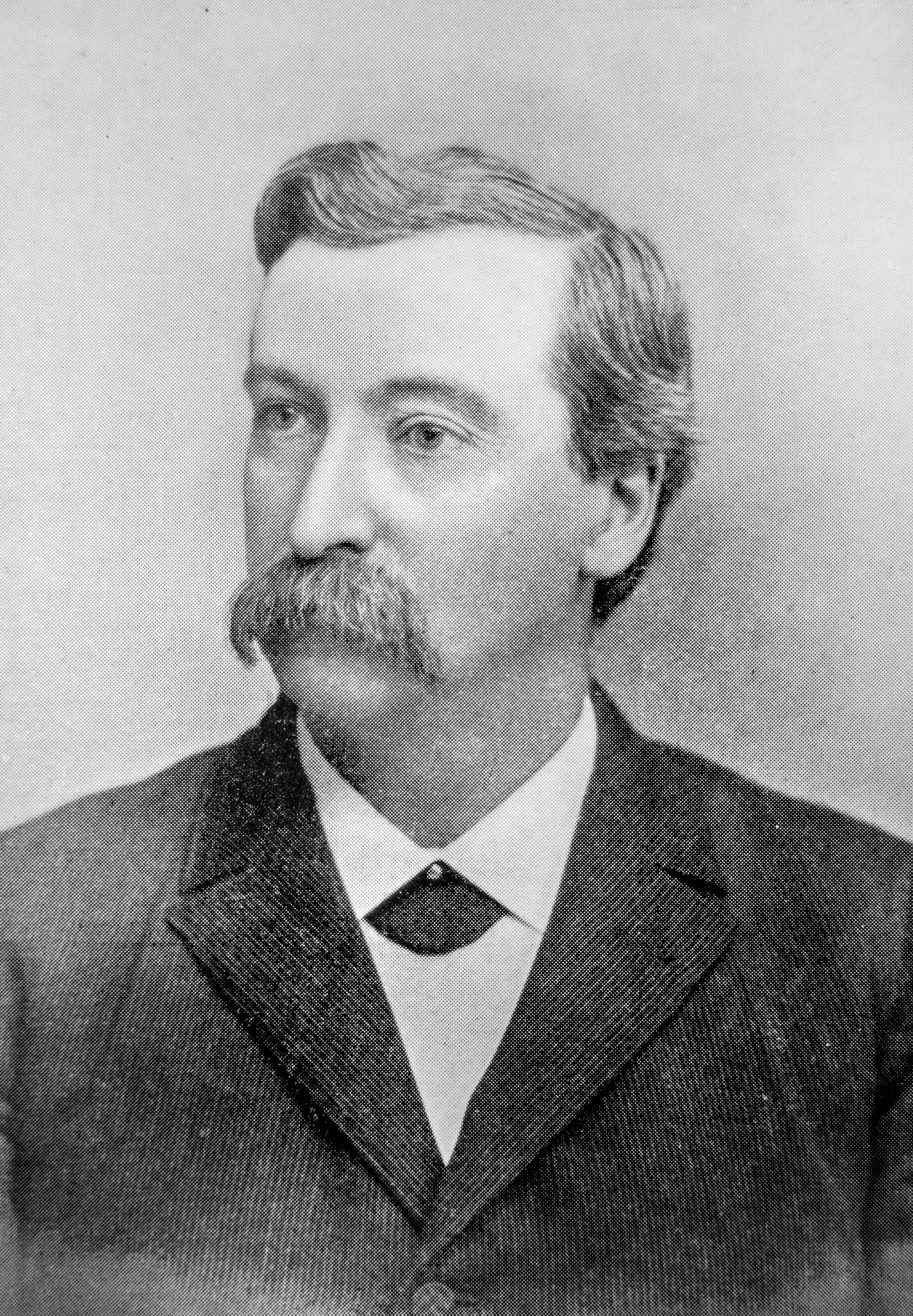
Nominee	William Gregory	Lucius F. C. Garvin
Party	Republican	Democratic
Popular vote	25,575	19,038
Percentage	53.64%	39.93%
- Gregory: 40–50% 50–60% 60–70% 70–80% 80-90% Garvin: 40–50% 50–60% 60–70%
Governor before election
William Gregory
Republican
Elected Governor
William Gregory
Republican

The 1901 Rhode Island gubernatorial election was held on November 5, 1901. Incumbent Republican William Gregory defeated Democratic nominee Lucius F. C. Garvin with 53.64% of the vote.

== General election ==
=== Candidates ===
Major party candidates

- William Gregory, Republican
- Lucius F. C. Garvin, Democratic

Other candidates

- William E. Brightman, Prohibition
- James P. Reid, Socialist Labor

=== Results ===
1901 Rhode Island gubernatorial election
Party	Candidate	Votes	%	±%
Republican	William Gregory (incumbent)	25,575	53.64%	
Democratic	Lucius F. C. Garvin	19,038	39.93%	
Prohibition	William E. Brightman	1,945	4.08%	
Socialist Labor	James P. Reid	1,120	2.35%	
Majority		6,537		
Turnout				
Republican hold		Swing		
