= James H. Higgins =

American politician (1876–1927)

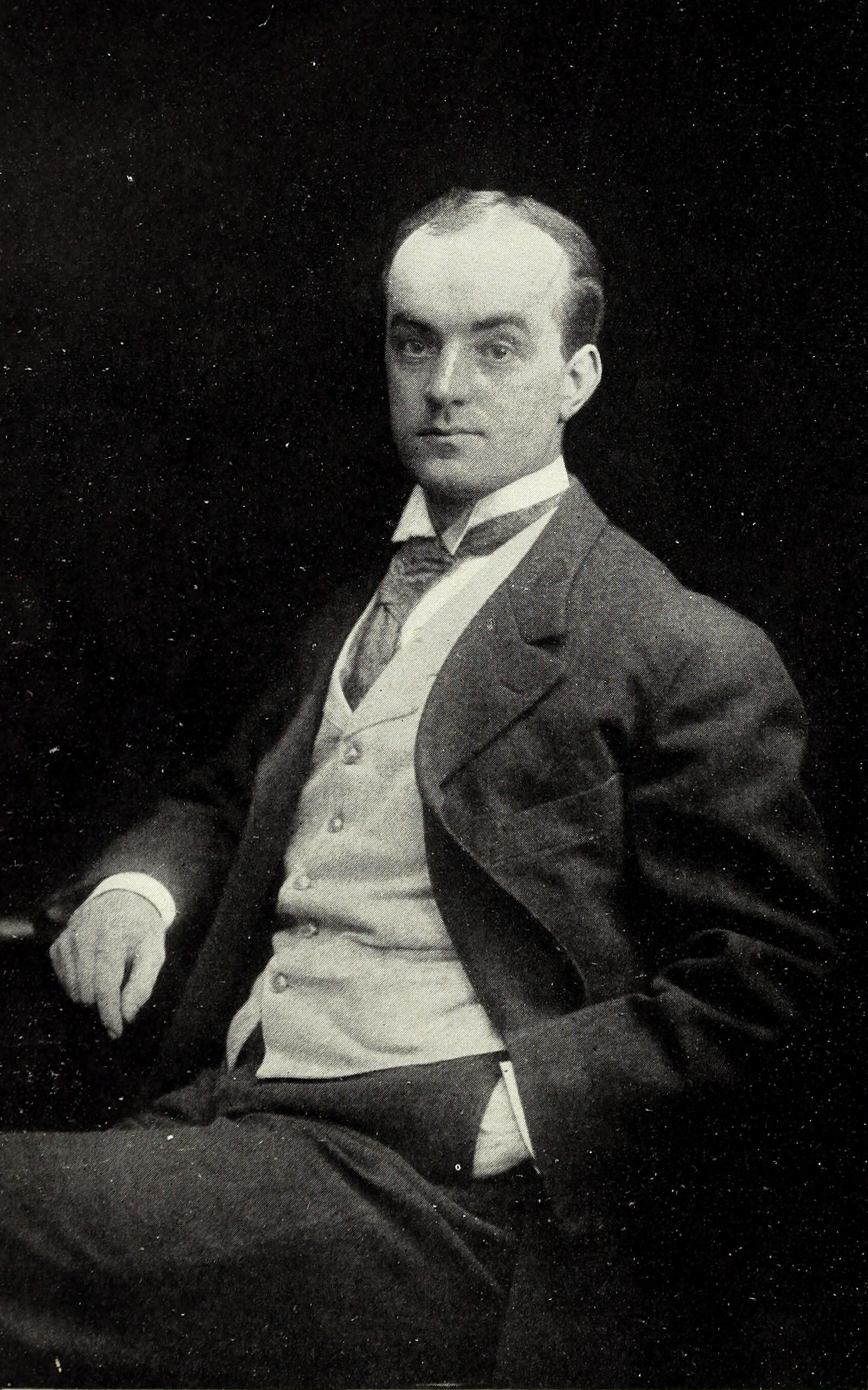

50th Governor of Rhode Island
- In office January 3, 1907 – January 5, 1909
- Lieutenant: Frederick H. Jackson
- Preceded by: George H. Utter
- Succeeded by: Aram J. Pothier

Member of the Rhode Island House of Representatives
- In office 1901

Personal details
- Born: January 22, 1876 Lincoln, Rhode Island, U.S.
- Died: September 16, 1927 (aged 51) Pawtucket, Rhode Island, U.S.
- Resting place: St. Mary's Cemetery, Pawtucket, Rhode Island
- Party: Democratic
- Spouse: Ellen F. Maguire
- Education: Brown University, Georgetown University

James Henry Higgins (January 22, 1876 – September 16, 1927) was an American politician and the 50th governor of Rhode Island from 1907 to 1909.

== Biography ==
=== Origins and education ===
Higgins was born on January 22, 1876, in the village of Saylesville in Lincoln, Rhode Island. His parents, Thomas F. and Elizabeth Ann Mather died while he was young. James attended Pawtucket High School, and put himself through Brown University, earning a Bachelor of Arts in 1898. He studied law at Georgetown University Law Center and graduated in 1900, before returning to Rhode Island.

=== Political career ===
In 1901, Higgins was elected to the Rhode Island General Assembly, representing Pawtucket. The next year, at the age of 26, he was elected to the first of four consecutive terms as mayor of Pawtucket.

==== 1906 gubernatorial campaign ====
In 1906, Higgins was nominated as the Democratic candidate for Governor of Rhode Island, challenging incumbent Republican governor George H. Utter. The New York Times attributed the popularity of the "boy Mayor of Pawtucket" to "his personality and private character. He does not drink or smoke." His acceptance speech echoed the Democratic convention platform, attacking corruption and the "boss system" of government, pledging an eight-hour workday for state and municipal workers, and endorsing the election of Rhode Island's United States senators by direct vote. (Popular election of U.S. senators eventually came to pass through the ratification of the Seventeenth Amendment to the United States Constitution in 1914.) Higgins' candidacy was endorsed by Colonel Robert Hale Ives Goddard and the short-lived Lincoln Party, which had been organized around Goddard's bid to succeed George P. Wetmore in the U.S. Senate and "smash the state machine".

After a campaign which seized on public discontent with the influence of lobbyist and Rhode Island Republican Party Central Committee chairman, General Charles R. Brayton, Higgins was elected over Utter by a margin of 1,238 votes, becoming Rhode Island's youngest governor, and its first Catholic governor.

==== Governor of Rhode Island ====
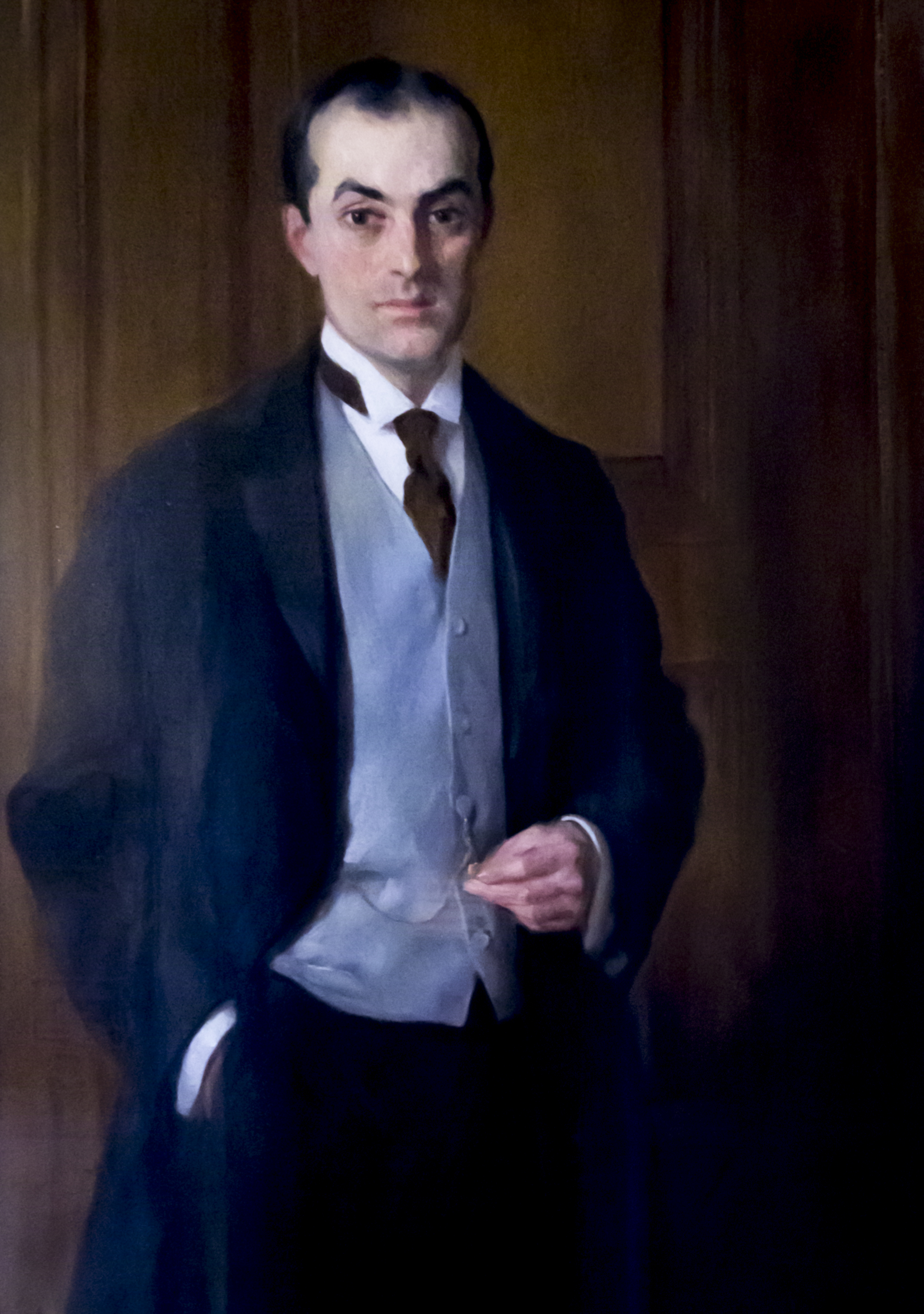
Higgins' official state house portrait

Higgins was sworn into office on January 3, 1907. In his inaugural speech, he built upon the themes of his campaign, warning that "the evils of lobbying" had compromised the state government to "a disgraceful extent," and that the power of lobbying had become "an exclusive and oppressive monopoly" in the hand of Brayton, a "coarse and venal boss" who was operating out of the Rhode Island State House offices of High Sheriff of Providence County, General Hunter C. White. Higgins' attacks on "Braytonism" were echoed in The New York Times, which in February published an article on "Rhode Island's Despot," alleging that "for forty years Brayton's control over the General Assembly, and consequently over all legislation, has been practically absolute".

In March 1907, Higgins wrote an open letter about Brayton to White: "Year in and year out he has occupied and used your office for his vile purposes, with your knowledge and consent ... clean this moral and political pest out of your office." White took no action, but in July Brayton resigned from the Executive Committee of the State Central Committee of the Republican Party.

In November 1907, Higgins won a second one-year term over a challenge by Republican Lieutenant Governor of Rhode Island, Frederick H. Jackson. Higgins declined to seek a third term as governor.

A number of laws concerning workers were also passed during his tenure.

=== Later life and death ===
In November, 1908, Higgins married Ellen F. Maguire of Pawtucket. In 1912, he ran unsuccessfully as a Democratic candidate in the United States Senate election in Rhode Island.

Higgins died September 16, 1927. He is buried at St. Mary's Cemetery in Pawtucket, Rhode Island.

== Notes ==
Party political offices
Preceded by Lucius F. C. Garvin	Democratic nominee for Governor of Rhode Island; 1906, 1907	Succeeded by Olney Arnold
Political offices
Preceded by George H. Utter	Governor of Rhode Island; January 3, 1907 – January 5, 1909	Succeeded by Aram J. Pothier
