= William Gregory (Rhode Island politician) =

American politician

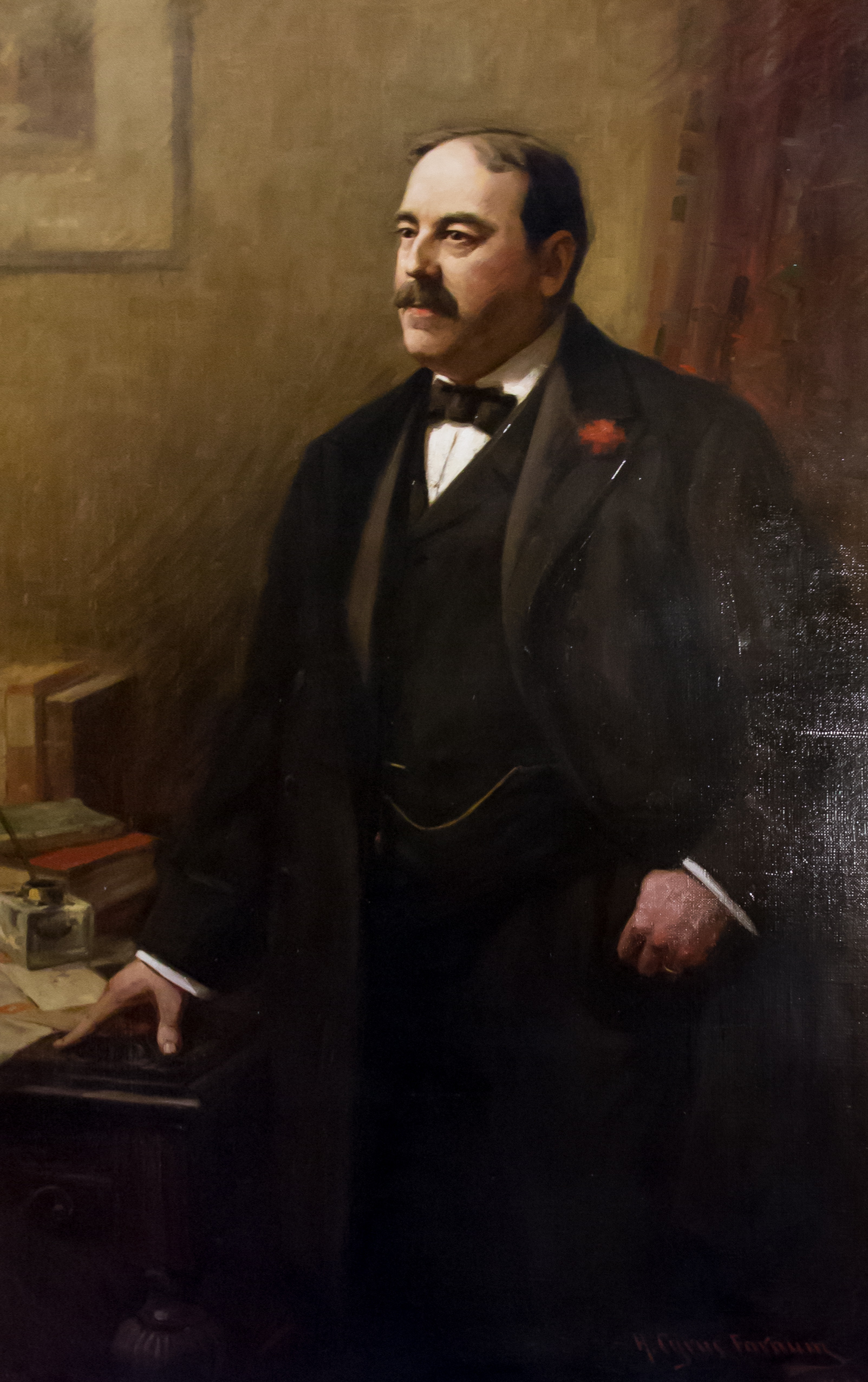

46th Governor of Rhode Island
- In office May 29, 1900 – December 16, 1901
- Lieutenant: Charles Kimball
- Preceded by: Elisha Dyer, Jr.
- Succeeded by: Charles D. Kimball

Lieutenant Governor of Rhode Island
- In office 1898–1900
- Preceded by: Aram J. Pothier
- Succeeded by: Charles Kimball

Personal details
- Born: August 3, 1849 Astoria, Queens, New York, U.S.
- Died: December 16, 1901 (aged 52) North Kingstown, Rhode Island, U.S.
- Party: Republican
- Spouse: Harriet Vaughan

William Gregory (August 3, 1849 – December 16, 1901) was an American politician who served as the 46th governor of Rhode Island.

== Early life ==
Gregory was born in Astoria, Long Island, New York on August 3, 1849. He attended high school in Westerly, Rhode Island, and became superintendent of a mill in Providence before he was 21.

== Career ==
Before entering politics, Gregory was as a wool mill owner in Wickford. He later served as president and Director of Wickford National Bank, Director of two Providence banks, and Chairman of the Board of State Charities and Corrections.

== Political life ==
Gregory served as Lieutenant Governor for two terms (1898-1900), and then served as Governor for one full term, and had been re-elected for a second term at the time of his death, from May 29, 1900 to December 16, 1901. During his administration, the state constitution was amended to move the capital from Newport to Providence. The new marble State House was opened in Providence, and Gregory became the first governor to occupy it. Gregory was an active member of the Freemasons.

== Personal life ==
In 1875 Gregory married Harriet Vaughan, daughter of Syria B. Vaughan, a merchant of Wickford. They had two children, Albert Winsor and Mary Louise.

Gregory was known to have suffered from Bright's disease for many years. He had been ill for "some time," but seemed to be recovering at the time of his death. He died on December 16, 1901, at his home in North Kingstown, Rhode Island, having recently won re-election to a second term of office.

== Sources ==
- Sobel, Robert and John Raimo. Biographical Directory of the Governors of the United States, 1789-1978. Greenwood Press, 1988. ISBN 0-313-28093-2

Party political offices
Preceded by Elisha Dyer Jr.	Republican nominee for Governor of Rhode Island; 1900, 1901	Succeeded by Charles D. Kimball
Political offices
Preceded by Elisha Dyer, Jr.	Governor of Rhode Island; 1900–1901	Succeeded by Charles D. Kimball
