= 2008–09 Rugby-Bundesliga results =

These are the results round-by-round for the Rugby-Bundesliga in 2008-09.

== Bundesliga results ==
Club	SCF	HRK	SCN	BRC	RGH	TSV	RKH	RKB	DRC
SC 1880 Frankfurt	—	27-22	24-14	67-7	54-13	81-19	30-9	69-0	50-0
Heidelberger RK	13-23	—	38-3	12-10	23-17	38-8	33-5	56-0	78-7
SC Neuenheim	16-46	31-23	—	13-8	23-28	18-6	37-15	69-14	49-7
Berliner RC	20-12	15-35	31-16	—	29-13	22-19	88-15	59-0	30-15
RG Heidelberg	15-29	3-5	19-15	20-6	—	12-6	38-19	17-5	35-10
TSV Handschuhsheim	36-31	25-12	16-20	53-21	9-16	—	28-25	78-7	64-12
RK Heusenstamm	29-53	10-36	7-27	19-24	28-23	22-29	—	37-20	41-12
RK 03 Berlin	7-44	17-25	5-27	14-42	14-36	12-73	17-20	—	34-23
DRC Hannover	7-53	11-15	0-45	5-29	6-18	28-52	20-35	13-29	—

=== Key ===
Home win	Draw	Away win	Game not played (awarded)

=== Round 1 ===
2008-08-30
14:30

SC Neuenheim	23 – 28	RG Heidelberg
	(Report) (in German)

Attendance: 400
Referee: Frank Himmer

2008-08-30
15:00

DRC Hannover	20 – 35	RK Heusenstamm
	(Report) (in German)

Referee: Dietmar Scharmann

2008-08-30
15:00

RK 03 Berlin	7 – 44	SC Frankfurt 1880
	(Report) (in German)

Attendance: 300
Referee: Dana Teagarden

2008-08-31
15:00

TSV Handschuhsheim	25 – 12	Heidelberger RK
	(Report) (in German)

Attendance: 500
Referee: Alan Roberts

=== Round 2 ===
2008-07-06
14:30

RK Heusenstamm	7 – 27	SC Neuenheim
	(Report) (in German)

Referee: Florian Forstmeyer

2008-07-06
14:30

RG Heidelberg	20 – 6	Berliner Rugby Club
	(Report) (in German)

Attendance: 350
Referee: Jens Reinecke

2008-07-06
16:30

TSV Handschuhsheim	36 – 31	SC Frankfurt 1880
	(Report) (in German)

Attendance: 400
Referee: Frank Himmer

2008-07-07
14:00

Heidelberger RK	78 – 7	DRC Hannover
	(Report) (in German)

Referee: Frank Himmer

=== Round 3 ===
2008-09-13
15:00

SC Neuenheim	13 – 8	Berliner Rugby Club
	(Report) (in German)

Attendance: 150
Referee: Florian Forstmeyer

2008-09-13
15:00

RK 03 Berlin	14 – 36	RG Heidelberg
	(Report) (in German)

Attendance: 150
Referee: Kerstin Ljungdahl

2008-09-13
15:00

DRC Hannover	7 – 53	SC Frankfurt 1880
	(Report) (in German)

Referee: Matthias Scheuerlein

2008-09-13
15:00

RK Heusenstamm	10 – 36	Heidelberger RK
	(Report) (in German)

Referee: Ralf Brunner

=== Round 4 ===
2008-09-17
19:00

Berliner Rugby Club	59 – 0	RK 03 Berlin
	(Report) (in German)

Attendance: 400
Referee: Kerstin Ljungdahl

2008-09-17
19:00

TSV Handschuhsheim	9 – 16	RG Heidelberg
	(Report) (in German)

Attendance: 500
Referee: Jens Reinecke

2008-09-17
19:00

SC Frankfurt 1880	30 – 9	RK Heusenstamm
	(Report) (in German)

Referee: Florian Forstmeyer

2008-09-18
19:00

Heidelberger RK	38 – 3	SC Neuenheim
	(Report) (in German)

Attendance: 300
Referee: Frank Himmer

=== Round 5 ===
2008-09-20
14:30

TSV Handschuhsheim	53 – 21	Berliner Rugby Club
	(Report) (in German)

Referee: Dietmar Scharmann

2008-09-20
15:00

DRC Hannover	6 – 18	RG Heidelberg
	(Report) (in German)

Attendance: 250
Referee: Dana Teagarden

2008-09-20
16:30

Heidelberger RK	13 – 23	SC Frankfurt 1880
	(Report) (in German)

Attendance: 350
Referee: Ralf Tietge

2008-09-21
14:30

RK 03 Berlin	5 – 27	SC Neuenheim
	(Report) (in German)

Attendance: 250
Referee: Matthias Scheuerlein

=== Round 6 ===
2008-10-03
15:00

TSV Handschuhsheim	78 – 7	RK 03 Berlin
	(Report) (in German)

Attendance: 200
Referee: Florian Forstmeyer

2008-10-04
13:00

Berliner Rugby Club	30 – 15	DRC Hannover
	(Report) (in German)

Attendance: 250
Referee: Dana Teagarden

2008-10-04
15:00

SC Frankfurt 1880	24 – 14	SC Neuenheim
	(Report) (in German)

Referee: Alan Roberts

2008-10-05
15:00

RG Heidelberg	38 – 19	RK Heusenstamm
	(Report) (in German)

Attendance: 300
Referee: Jens Reinecke

=== Round 7 ===
2008-10-25
14:00

TSV Handschuhsheim	16 – 20	SC Neuenheim
	(Report) (in German)

Referee: Kerstin Ljungdahl

2008-10-25
15:00

RK Heusenstamm	19 – 24	Berliner Rugby Club
	(Report) (in German)

Referee: Alan Roberts

2008-10-25
15:00

RK 03 Berlin	34 – 23	DRC Hannover
	(Report) (in German)

Attendance: 300
Referee: Dietmar Scharmann

2008-10-26
15:00

Heidelberger RK	23 – 17	RG Heidelberg
	(Report) (in German)

Attendance: 600
Referee: Jens Reinecke

=== Round 8 ===
2008-11-01
14:30

DRC Hannover	28 – 52	TSV Handschuhsheim
	(Report) (in German)

Referee: Ralf Tietge

2008-11-01
15:00

RG Heidelberg	15 – 29	SC Frankfurt 1880
	(Report) (in German)

Attendance: 600
Referee: Alan Roberts

2008-11-01
15:00

RK Heusenstamm	37 – 20	RK 03 Berlin
	(Report) (in German)

Referee: Florian Forstmeyer

2008-11-01
15:00

Berliner Rugby Club	15 – 35	Heidelberger RK
	(Report) (in German)

Referee: Dietmar Scharmann

=== Round 9 ===
2008-11-22
15:00

SC Frankfurt 1880	67 – 7	Berliner Rugby Club
	(Report) (in German)

Referee: Peter Keller

2008-11-22
15:00

Heidelberger RK	56 – 0	RK 03 Berlin
	(Report) (in German)

Referee: Florian Forstmeyer

2008-11-23
15:00

TSV Handschuhsheim	28 – 25	RK Heusenstamm
	(Report) (in German)

Attendance: 100
Referee: Jens Reinecke

2009-02-28
14:30

DRC Hannover	0 – 45	SC Neuenheim
	(Report) (in German)

Referee: Kerstin Ljungdahl

=== Round 10 ===
2008-11-29
14:30

RK Heusenstamm	41 – 12	DRC Hannover
	(Report) (in German)

Referee: Alan Roberts

2008-11-29
15:00

Heidelberger RK	38 – 8	TSV Handschuhsheim
	(Report) (in German)

Referee: Florian Forstmeyer

2008-11-29
15:00

SC Frankfurt 1880	69 – 0	RK 03 Berlin
	(Report) (in German)

Referee: Dietmar Scharmann

2008-11-30
14:00

RG Heidelberg	19 – 15	SC Neuenheim
	(Report) (in German)

Referee: Frank Himmer

=== Round 11 ===
2008-12-06
14:30

DRC Hannover	11 – 15	Heidelberger RK
	(Report) (in German)

Attendance: 150
Referee: Frank Frederking

2008-12-07
15:00

SC Frankfurt 1880	81 – 19	TSV Handschuhsheim
	(Report) (in German)

Referee: Frank Himmer

2009-03-07
15:00

SC Neuenheim	37 – 15	RK Heusenstamm
	(Report) (in German)

Referee: Florian Forstmeyer

2009-04-25
15:00

Berliner Rugby Club	29 – 13	RG Heidelberg
	Report (in German)

Referee: Frank Himmer

=== Round 12 ===
2009-03-14
15:00

Berliner Rugby Club	31 – 16	SC Neuenheim
	(Report) (in German)

Referee: Frank Himmer

2009-03-14
15:00

RG Heidelberg	17 – 5	RK 03 Berlin
	(Report) (in German)

Attendance: 100
Referee: Florian Forstmeyer

2009-03-14
15:00

SC Frankfurt 1880	50 – 0 ^{1}	DRC Hannover
	(Report) (in German)

Referee: Brunner

2009-03-15
15:00

Heidelberger RK	33 – 5	RK Heusenstamm
	(Report) (in German)

Referee: Jens Reinecke

=== Round 13 ===
2009-03-21
15:00

SC Neuenheim	69 – 14	RK 03 Berlin
	(Report) (in German)

Referee: Alan Roberts

2009-03-21
15:00

Berliner Rugby Club	22 – 19	TSV Handschuhsheim
	(Report) (in German)

Referee: Dietmar Scharmann

2009-03-21
15:00

SC Frankfurt 1880	27 – 22	Heidelberger RK
	(Report) (in German)

Referee: Frank Himmer

2009-03-22
15:00

RG Heidelberg	35 – 10	DRC Hannover
	(Report) (in German)

Attendance: 100
Referee: Gil

=== Round 14 ===
2009-03-28
15:00

RK 03 Berlin	12 – 73	TSV Handschuhsheim
	(Report) (in German)

Attendance: 250
Referee: Dana Teagarden

2009-03-28
15:00

RK Heusenstamm	28 – 23	RG Heidelberg
	(Report) (in German)

Referee: Florian Forstmeyer

2009-03-29
14:30

DRC Hannover	5 – 29	Berliner Rugby Club
	(Report) (in German)

Referee: Dietmar Scharmann

2009-03-29
15:00

SC Neuenheim	16 – 46	SC Frankfurt 1880
	(Report) (in German)

Attendance: 500
Referee: Frank Himmer

=== Round 15 ===
2009-04-04
15:00

SC Neuenheim	18 – 6	TSV Handschuhsheim
	(Report) (in German)

Attendance: 500
Referee: Florian Forstmeyer

2009-04-04
15:00

Berliner Rugby Club	88 – 15	RK Heusenstamm
	(Report) (in German)

Referee: Jens Reinecke

2009-04-05
15:00

RG Heidelberg	3 – 5	Heidelberger RK
	(Report) (in German)

Attendance: 200
Referee: Alan Roberts

2009-05-16
14:30

DRC Hannover	13 – 29	RK 03 Berlin
	(Report) (in German)

Referee: Schomacker

=== Round 16 ===
2009-04-18
15:00

SC Frankfurt 1880	54 – 13	RG Heidelberg
	(Report) (in German)

Referee: Frank Himmer

2009-04-18
15:00

RK 03 Berlin	17 – 20	RK Heusenstamm
	(Report) (in German)

Attendance: 200
Referee: Frank Frederking

2009-04-18
15:00

Heidelberger RK	12 – 10	Berliner Rugby Club
	(Report) (in German)

Referee: Florian Forstmeyer

2009-04-19
14:30

TSV Handschuhsheim	64 – 12	DRC Hannover
	(Report) (in German)

Referee: Gil

=== Round 17 ===
2009-04-21
19:00

RK Heusenstamm	29 – 53	SC Frankfurt 1880
	Report (in German)

Referee: Alan Roberts

2009-04-21
19:00

SC Neuenheim	31 – 23	Heidelberger RK
	Report (in German)

Referee: Florian Forstmeyer

2009-04-22
19:00

RK 03 Berlin	14 – 42	Berliner Rugby Club
	Report (in German)

Attendance: 350
Referee: Florian Forstmeyer

2009-04-22
19:00

RG Heidelberg	12 – 6	TSV Handschuhsheim
	Report (in German)

Attendance: 500
Referee: Frank Himmer

=== Round 18 ===
2009-03-07
15:00

RK 03 Berlin	17 – 25	Heidelberger RK
	Report (in German)

Referee: Kerstin Ljungdahl

2009-04-26
15:00

RK Heusenstamm	22 – 29	TSV Handschuhsheim
	Report (in German)

Referee: Jens Reinecke

2009-05-09
15:00

SC Neuenheim	49 – 7	DRC Hannover
	Report (in German)

Referee: Alan Roberts

2009-05-09
15:00

Berliner Rugby Club	20 – 12	SC Frankfurt 1880
	Report (in German)

Referee: Jens Reinecke

- ^{1} The DRC Hannover canceled the game, it was awarded to SC 1880 Frankfurt.

== Promotion/relegation play-off ==
=== Relegation match ===
2009-05-21
15:00

RK 03 Berlin	–	DRC Hannover

- The DRC Hannover canceled the game on 18 April 2009 and voluntarily accepted relegation to the 2nd Bundesliga North/East.

== Semi-finals and final ==
=== Semi-finals ===
2009-05-16
15:00

SC 1880 Frankfurt	36 – 15	Berliner Rugby Club
	Report

Sportanlage in der Feldgericht, Frankfurt am Main
Referee: Dana Teagarden

2009-05-16
15:00

Heidelberger RK	19 – 14 (aet)	SC Neuenheim
Try: Pretorius 98'; Con: Pretorius 98'; Pen: Pretorius (3) 7', 39', 56'; Drop: Jordaan 103'	Report	Try: Smit 98'; Pen: Eckert (3) 16', 40', 60'

Heidelberg
Attendance: 1,200
Referee: Frank Himmer

=== Final ===
2009-05-23
14:00

SC 1880 Frankfurt	11 – 8	Heidelberger RK
Try: Kupa 36'; Pen: Kupa (2) 10', 73'	Report	Try: Schliwa 20'; Pen: Pretorius 52'

Sportanlage in der Feldgerichtstrasse, Frankfurt am Main
Attendance: 3,200
Referee: Jens Reinecke

SC 1880 FRANKFURT:
FB	15	Ralph Klinghammer (substituted off) 46'
RW	14	Jamie Houston
OC	13	Kuramate Tama Tuirirangi (substituted off) 79'
IC	12	Daniel Preussner (substituted off) 61'
LW	11	Rolf Wacha
FH	10	Corey Read
SH	9	Aaron Satchwell
N8	8	Ross Warrick
OF	7	Api Matenga (substituted off) 76'
BF	6	Jason Campell
RL	5	Kieran Manawatu
LL	4	Philip Aporo (substituted off) 55'
TP	3	Anton Ewald
HK	2	Bratley Langenhoven (substituted off) 61'
LP	1	Russel Kupa
Substitutes:
HK	16	Marcus Seuseu (substituted in) 61' (substituted off) 71'
LL	17	Jovesa Naivalu (substituted in) 55'
OF	18	Dennis Feidelberg (substituted in) 76'
IC	19	Jannis Läpple (substituted in) 61' (substituted off) 79'
IC	20	Karsten Dobs (substituted in) 79'
OC	21	Chris Howells (substituted in) 79'
FB	22	Syd Douglas (substituted in) 46'
Coach:
(New Zealand) Phil Stevenson

HEIDELBERGER RK:
FB	15	Frederik Potgieter
RW	14	Alexander Biskupek
OC	13	Patrick Schliwa (substituted off) 65'
IC	12	Dan Armitage
LW	11	Julio David Rodriguez
FH	10	Manuel Ballerin (substituted off) 77'
SH	9	Andreas Kerber (substituted off) 75'
N8	8	Johannes Erasmus
OF	7	Sean Armstrong
BF	6	Pieter Johannes Jordaan
RL	5	Christopher Liebig (substituted off) 40'
LL	4	Sydney Brenner
TP	3	Christoffer Neureuther
HK	2	Steffen Liebig
LP	1	Braam Pretorius
Substitutes:
RL	16	Jürgen Missal (substituted in) 40'
SH	17	Sascha Fraser (substituted in) 75'
FH	18	Jörg Bielinski (substituted in) 77'
OC	19	Arthur Zeiler (substituted in) 65'
	20
	21
	22
Coach:
(Australia) Murray Archibald
