= Germany at the 2008–2010 European Nations Cup =

Germany
- 2008–2010 season
- Head coach: Rudolf Finsterer; Mark Kuhlmann; Bruno Stolorz
- Chairman: Claus-Peter Bach
- ENC First Division: 6th (relegated)
- Top try scorer: League: Krause (2); All: Krause (3)
- Top points scorer: League: Wiedemann (11); All: Wiedemann (20)
- Highest home attendance: 3,400
- Lowest home attendance: 2,000

Germany at the 2008–2010 European Nations Cup was the first time since 1981 that the German national rugby union team competed at the highest level of FIRA rugby, the European Nations Cup, during 2008–2010.

Germany played ten competition games and two friendlies in its campaign. It lost all ten competition games and, with the exception of the two games against Spain, did so quite clearly, ultimately resulting in Germany's relegation back to the Division 2A for the 2010–12 season. Of the two warm-up friendlies, it lost its match against a Welsh Districts XV, too and managed to win only the game against Hong Kong. A third friendly, against a selection of the British Forces Germany, the British Army Germany rugby union team, had to be postponed twice because of bad weather and was eventually cancelled.

Germany also played two friendlies against Switzerland, to contest the Alpencup, but these games were not counted towards the country's official record as the sides fielded were an under-21 side in 2008 and labelled as Germany A in 2009.

Germany went into its campaign unbeaten at home, having last lost on 12 November 2000, to Ukraine. This record was broken on in its first game on 8 November 2008, when it lost to the Welsh XV.

== Background ==
The 2008–2010 European Nations Cup First Division was the seventh edition of the championship since it was reformed in 2000. The championship not only determined the champions of the ENC but it also acted as an element of European qualification for the 2011 Rugby World Cup in New Zealand.

The top two teams qualified directly to the 2011 Rugby World Cup, and the third-placed entered the European qualification playoffs.

The last placed team in the competition was relegated to the Division 2A.

== Management and coaching ==
At the beginning of Germany's ENC campaign, it was coached by a troika, made up of Rudolf Finsterer, Bruno Stolorz and Mark Kuhlmann, under the supervision of Peter Ianusevici, Germany's Director of Rugby. Kuhlman resigned from his post in March 2009 after over three years of service, without being replaced, while the other two remained in their positions. After losing its tenth and final ENC game, Rudolf Finsterer resigned, having spent ten years as coach of Germany. Finsterer's decision however had been made before the game, and he had informed the team of his decision beforehand, too.

With the international retirement of captain Jens Schmidt in May 2009, Mustafa Güngör became the new captain of the national team with his first game in this position being the one against Hong Kong.

== Debuts & retirements ==
Germany lost a number of players due to retirement during its ENC campaign, usually because most German players are still amateurs and their work commitments don't allow them to continue playing internationally. Along with two former captains, Colin Grzanna and Jens Schmidt, Germany lost two very important players in May 2009. Additionally, Gerrit van Look, Sebastien Chaule and Pierre Faber were all long-term players in the team who terminated their international career.

Partly because of this, Germany fielded a large number of new and young players during its two-year ENC campaign. In the friendly match against Hong Kong alone, eight players made their debut for their country. Anjo Buckman, Daniel Preussner, Mark Sztyndera, Patrick Schliwa, Alexander Hauck, Benjamin Ulrich, Raphael Hackl and Jamie Houston all fielded for Germany for the first time in this game and all have since played for Germany again.

A number of other players also made their debut during the 2008–10 campaign, these being Udo Schwarz, Juan Martin Goity (Wales XV, 2009), Benjamin Brierley, Damien Tussac (Georgia, 2009), Christopher Liebig (Portugal, 2009), Rob Elloway (Russia, 2009), Lukas Hinds-Johnson, Lukas Rosenthal, Guillaume Franke, Shalva Didebashvili, Steffen Liebig (Georgia, 2010), Alexander Metz (Romania, 2010), Fabian Heimpel (Portugal, 2010) and Gilles Pagnon (Russia, 2010).

Christopher Weselek and Michael Poppmeier, two players, returned to the squad after a lengthy absence.

== Game locations ==
Of the seven home games Germany had in this campaign, four were held in Heidelberg and one each in Hanover, Heusenstamm and Berlin. The later was the first game of the German team to be held in the capital in over eight years.

The five away games were in Madrid, Lisbon, Tbilisi, Sochi and Constanţa. The latter was originally scheduled for Bucharest but had to be moved to the Black Sea coast because of bad weather in the Romanian capital, a general issue affecting a number of test matches in early 2010 in Europe.

== Table ==
ENC Champions and Qualified as Europe 1
Qualified for 2011 Rugby World Cup
Qualified for Round 2
Relegated to 2A for 2010–2012

Table points are determined as follows:

- 3 points for a win
- 2 points for a draw
- 1 point for a loss
- 0 points for a forfeit

Place	Nation	Games				Points			Table points
Place	Nation	Played	Won	Drawn	Lost	For	Against	Difference	Table points
1	Georgia (16)	10	8	1	1	326	132	+194	27
2	Russia (17)	10	7	1	2	291	175	+116	25
3	Romania (19)	10	6	1	3	282	136	+146	23
4	Portugal (21)	10	5	1	4	255	149	+106	21
5	Spain (23)	10	2	0	8	145	304	−159	14
6	Germany (26)	10	0	0	10	58	461	−403	10

== Games ==
=== ENC matches ===
15 November 2008
16:00

Spain	22–11	Germany
Try: Martín Goenaga 38'; Con: Riu 39'; Pen: Riu (4) 4', 17', 57', 60'; Drop: Riu 20'	(Report) (Line up)	Try: Wiedemann 23'; Pen: Wiedemann (2) 2', 54'

Campo Universitaria, Madrid
Attendance: 8,000
Referee: Paolo Ventura (Italy)

7 February 2009
14:00

Germany	5–38	Georgia
Tries: Brierley 14'	(Report) (Line up)	Tries: Chkhikvadze 20', Zirakashvili 31', Machkhaneli 56', Gorgodze 62', Kacharava 80'; Con: Kvirikashvili (4) 56', 62', 72', 80'

Fritz-Grunebaum-Sportpark, Heidelberg
Attendance: 3,000
Referee: Graham Knox (Scotland)

14 February 2009
14:00

Germany	0–22	Romania
	(Report) (Line up)	Try: Burbuliceanu 7', Fercu 65', Mitu 79'; Con: Mitu (2) 7', 65'; Pen: Mitu 57'

Fritz-Grunebaum-Sportpark, Heidelberg
Attendance: 2,000
Referee: Colin Stanley (Ireland)

21 February 2009
15:00

Portugal	44–6	Germany
Try: Silva 12', Mateus 15', Foro 66', Uva 71', Murré 80'; Con: Cabral (2) 12', 15', Leal (3) 66', 71', 80'; Pen: Cabral (2) 6', 36', Leal 58'	(Report) (Line up)	Pen: Davies (2) 3', 50'

Estádio Universitário de Lisboa, Lisbon
Attendance: 5,000
Referee: Stefano Penne (Italy)

2 May 2009
15:00

Germany	0–53	Russia
	(Report) (Line up)	Try: Kushnarev 20', Kluchnikov 33', Gresev 40', Trishin 63', Gvosdovskiy 69', Garbuzov 77', Matveyev 79'; Con: Kushnarev 20', 33', Motorin 63', 69', 77', 79'; Pen: Kushnarev 16', 43'

Rudolf-Kalweit-Stadion, Hanover
Attendance: 3,400
Referee: JP Doyle (England)

6 February 2010
14:00

Georgia	77–3	Germany
Try: Penalty try 5', Nemsadze (2) 19', 26', Kvirikashvili (2) 22', 68', Machkhaneli (2) 29', 52', Samkharadze (2) 34', 46', Zibzibadze 77', Udesiani 80'; Con: Kvirikashvili (11) 5', 11', 19', 22', 26', 29', 34', 52', 68', 77', 80'	(Report) (Line up)	Pen: Davies 33'

Boris Paichadze Stadium, Tbilisi
Referee: Patrick Pechambert (France)

13 February 2010
13:30

Romania	67–5	Germany
Tries: Calafeteanu, Carpo (2), Ciuntu, Dimofte, Dragoș Dima, Dumitraș, Fercu, Sîrbu, Tonița, Zebega; Con: Calafeteanu (3), Vlaicu (3)	(Report) (Line up)	Tries: Sztyndera

Stadionul Constructorul Cleopatra, Constanţa
Referee: Claudio Passacantando (Italy)

27 February 2010
14:15

Germany	0–69	Portugal
	(Report) (Line up)	Tries: Oliveira 7', Foro (3) 14', 64', 77', Correia 29', Fernandes 35', Mateus 40', Uva 55', Leal 76'; Pen: Cabral (2) 27', 46'; Con: Cabral (5) 3', 7', 29', 35', 49', Gardener (4) 55', 64', 75', 77'

Kultur- und Sportzentrum Martinsee, Heusenstamm
Attendance: 2,500
Referee: Neil Paterson (Scotland)

13 March 2010
15:00

Russia	48–11	Germany
Tries: Penalty try 12', Kluchnikov 39', Ostroushko 47', 69', Artemiev 53', Babaev 58', Minadze 60'; Pen: Kushnarev (2) 18', 21', Kluchnikov 55'; Con: Kushnarev 12', Kluchnikov 39'	(Report) (Line up)	Tries: Krause 83'; Pen: Güngör (2) 15', 51'

Central Stadium, Sochi
Attendance: 200
Referee: Pascal Gauzere (France)

20 March 2010
14:30

Germany	17–21	Spain
Tries: Krause 60', Grumbkow 70'; Pen: Heimpel 23'; Con: Heimpel (2) 60', 70'	(Report) (Line up)	Tries: Heredia (2) 17', 42', Cidre 80'; Pen: Con: Sempere (3) 17', 42', 80'

Fritz-Grunebaum-Sportpark, Heidelberg
Attendance: 2,500
Referee: Carlo Damasco (Italy)

=== Friendlies ===
8 November 2008
14:00

Germany	14–27	(Wales) Welsh Districts XV
Tries: Krause 72'; Pen: Wiedemann (3) 12', 26', 36'	(Report) (Line up)	Tries: Bonnell 21', Martin 46', Howells 56', M. Davies 60'; Pen: Howells 41'; Con: Howells (2) 46', 56'

Hanns-Braun-Stadion, Berlin
Attendance: 2,000
Referee: Zeszutek (Poland)

12 December 2009
14:30

Germany	24–14	Hong Kong
Tries: D. Davies 6', Simm 24', Pipa 60'; Pen: K. Davies (3) 15', 20', 74'	(Report) (Line up)	Tries: Penalty Try 43', Hewson 80'; Con: Perkins 43', Hadley 80'

Fritz-Grunebaum-Sportpark, Heidelberg
Attendance: 2,000
Referee: Horatiu Bargaunas (Romania)

16 January 2010
14:00

Germany	P–P	British Army Germany XV
	(Report)

Sportanlage der britischen Kaserne, Gütersloh

31 January 2010
14:00

Germany	P–P	British Army Germany XV
	(Report)

Sportzentrum am Burgweg, Rheda-Wiedenbrück

== Player statistics ==
=== Squad ===
The following players were part of the German team during its 2008–10 campaign:

Backs
Player	Position	Club
Mustafa Güngör (c)	Scrum-half	RG Heidelberg
Raphael Pyrasch	Scrum-half	DSV 78 Hannover
Kieron Davies	Fly-half	(England) Luton RFC (England) Ampthill & District RFC
Fabian Heimpel	Fly-half	RG Heidelberg
Thorsten Wiedemann	Fly-half	TSV Handschuhsheim
Benjamin Simm	Centre	DSV 78 Hannover
Edmoore Takaendesa	Centre	RG Heidelberg
Clemens von Grumbkow	Centre	(France) RC Orléans (Italy) Cavalieri Prato
Christopher Weselek	Centre	RG Heidelberg
Lars Eckert	Centre	SC Neuenheim
Colin Grzanna	Centre	Berliner RC
Marten Strauch	Centre	SC Neuenheim
Gilles Pagnon	Centre	(France) RC Orléans
Anjo Buckman	Centre	Heidelberger RK
Benjamin Ulrich	Centre	RK 03 Berlin
Benjamin Brierley	Wing	SC 1880 Frankfurt (England) Ampthill & District RFC
Guillaume Franke	Wing	(France) RC Orléans
Christopher Liebig	Wing	Heidelberger RK
Steffen Liebig	Wing	Heidelberger RK
Mark Sztyndera	Wing	SC 1880 Frankfurt
Sebastien Chaule	Wing	TSV Handschuhsheim
Markus Walger	Wing	RK Heusenstamm
Udo Schwarz	Wing	SC Neuenheim
Juan Martin Goity	Wing	(England) Newmarket RFC
Domenick Davies	Fullback	(England) Bournemouth RFC
Raphael Hackl	Fullback	Berliner RC
Matthieu Franke	Fullback	(France) RC Orléans

Forwards
Player	Position	Club
Tim Coly	Hooker	RG Heidelberg
Rob Elloway	Hooker	(England) Cornish Pirates
Jamie Houston	Hooker	SC 1880 Frankfurt
Christian Baracat	Prop	SC Neuenheim
Benjamin Krause	Prop	DSV 78 Hannover
Marcus Trick	Prop	SC Neuenheim
Damien Tussac	Prop	(France) RC Toulon
Alexander Widiker	Prop	(France) RC Orléans
Pierre Faber	Prop	RG Heidelberg
Patrick Schliwa	Prop	Heidelberger RK
Lukas Hinds-Johnson	Lock	RK 03 Berlin
Michael Poppmeier	Lock	(Italy) Lazio Rugby (South Africa) Villagers RFC
Daniel Preussner	Lock	SC 1880 Frankfurt
Benjamin Danso	Lock	DRC Hannover; Heidelberger RK
Jens Schmidt	Lock	TSV Handschuhsheim
Bodo Sieber	Lock	(South Africa) University of Cape Town
Manuel Wilhelm	Lock	RG Heidelberg
Rolf Wacha	Lock	SC 1880 Frankfurt
Lukas Rosenthal	Lock	RK 03 Berlin
Kehoma Brenner	Flanker	RG Heidelberg
Tim Kasten	Flanker	(England) Southend RFC; Heidelberger RK
Shalva Didebashvili	Flanker	SC Neuenheim
Alexander Hug	Flanker	TSV Handschuhsheim
Alexander Metz	Flanker	TSV Handschuhsheim
Alexander Pipa	Flanker	TSV Handschuhsheim
Timur Tekkal	Flanker	TSV Victoria Linden
Gerrit van Look	Flanker	Berliner RC
Robert Mohr	Number 8	(France) La Rochelle
Alexander Hauck	Number 8	SC 1880 Frankfurt

- Clubs listed are the club or clubs a player played for while playing for Germany in 2008–10, not current club.

=== Games ===
The following players have been selected for Germany from 2008 to 2010 in the country's European Nation Cup campaign and in friendlies:

Player	**Caps**	**2008**		**2009**					**2010**				
		**W XV**	**Spa**	**Geo**	**Rom**	**Por**	**Rus**	**HK**	**Geo**	**Rom**	**Por**	**Rus**	**Spa**
Benjamin Krause	38	**1**	**1**	**19** (substituted on)	**16** (substituted on)	**16** (substituted on)	**16** (substituted on)	**1** (substituted off)	**2**	**17** (substituted on)	**16** (substituted on)	**1**	**1** (substituted off)
Alexander Widiker	38	**3**	**3**	**1**	**1** (substituted off)	**1**	**1**		**2**	**1** (substituted off)	**1** (yellow card)	**2**	**2**
Tim Coly	35	**2** (substituted off)	**2** (yellow card)	**2** (substituted off)	**2** (substituted off)	**2**	**2**	**3**	**3** (substituted off)	**3** (substituted off)	**2** (substituted off)	**3**	**3**
Manuel Wilhelm	32	**5** (substituted off)	**19** (substituted on)	**18** (substituted on)	**18** (substituted on)	**8** (substituted off)	**4**	**4**	**4**	**4** (substituted off)	**4**	**4**	**4** (substituted off)
Bodo Sieber	22	**7**	**4**	**5**	**5**	**5** (substituted off)	**5** (c)						**5**
Jamie Houston	6							**2** (substituted off)	**6**	**6**	**6**	**7**	**6** (substituted off)
Kehoma Brenner	13	**21** (substituted on)		**17** (substituted on)	**17** (substituted on)	**19** (substituted on)	**7** (substituted off)	**7** (yellow card)		**7** (substituted off)		**6**	**7** (yellow card)
Robert Mohr			**8**		**8** (substituted off)					**5**			**8**
Raphael Pyrasch	7	**16** (substituted on)							**20** (substituted on)	**20** (substituted on) (yellow card)	**22** (substituted on)	**9** (yellow card)	**9** (substituted off)
Fabian Heimpel	2										**10**		**10**
Christopher Weselek	28										**11** (yellow card)	**14**	**11**
Clemens von Grumbkow	29		**11**	**11**	**11** (substituted off)	**11** (yellow card) (substituted off)	**13**	**12**	**13**	**13**	**13** (substituted off)	**12** (substituted off)	**12**
Gilles Pagnon	2											**13**	**13** (substituted off)
Mustafa Güngör	32	**9**	**9**	**9**	**9**	**9**	**9**	**9** (c)	**9** (c)	**9** (c)	**9** (c)	**10** (c)	**14** (c)
Raphael Hackl	6							**22** (substituted on)	**15**	**15** (substituted off)	**20** (substituted on)	**15**	**15** (substituted off)
Damien Tussac	4			**16** (substituted on)	**17** (substituted on)						**3** (substituted off)		**16** (substituted on)
Jens Schmidt	38	**4** (substituted off) (c)	**5** (c)	**4** (c)	**4** (c)	**4** (c)							17
Michael Poppmeier				**8** (substituted off)	**7** (substituted off)						**5**		**18** (substituted on)
Alexander Pipa							**17** (substituted on)	**8**			**19** (substituted on)		**19** (substituted on)
Benjamin Simm	16			**13**	**13** (substituted off)		**11**	**14** (substituted off)	**11**	**11** (substituted off)	**21** (substituted on)	**11**	**20** (substituted on)
Benjamin Ulrich	2							**13** (substituted off)					**21** (substituted on)
Kieron Davies	34	**12**	**13**	**10** (substituted off)	**10**	**10**	**12** (substituted off)	**10**	**10**	**10**	**15**		**22** (substituted on)
Rolf Wacha	8	**18** (substituted on)		**20** (substituted on)		**20** (substituted on)		**5** (substituted off)	**19** (substituted on)		18	**5** (substituted off)	
Alexander Hauck	5							**19** (substituted on)	**8** (substituted off)	**8**	**8**	**8** (substituted off)	
Patrick Schliwa	2							**17** (substituted on)	**16** (substituted on)			16	
Alexander Metz	3									**18** (substituted on)	**17** (substituted on)	**17** (substituted on)	
Lukas Rosenthal	1								**18** (substituted on)			18	
Lukas Hinds-Johnson	3								**17** (substituted on)	**19** (substituted on)		**19** (substituted on)	
Mark Sztyndera	4							**21** (substituted on)	**14** (substituted off)	**14**	**14** (substituted off)	20	
Steffen Liebig	1								**21** (substituted on)	21		21	
Anjo Buckman	2							**20** (substituted on)				**22** (substituted on)	
Edmoore Takaendesa	10	**15**	**15** (substituted off)	**12**	**15**	**15**			**12**	**12**	**12** (substituted off)		
Alexander Hug	7	**22** (substituted on)		**7** (substituted off)	**20** (substituted on)	**7** (substituted off)		**6** (substituted off)			**7** (substituted off)		
Marcus Trick	19	**20** (substituted on)	17			17		**16** (substituted on)		**16** (substituted on)			
Rob Elloway	2						**18** (substituted on)			**2**			
Christopher Liebig	2					**22** (substituted on)				**22** (substituted on)			
Daniel Preussner	2						22	**18** (substituted on)	**5** (substituted off)				
Shalva Didebashvili	1								**7** (substituted off)				
Guillaume Franke	1								**22** (substituted on)				
Benjamin Brierley	5			**14** (substituted off)	**14**	**14**	**14** (substituted off)	**11**					
Domenick Davies							**15**	**15** (substituted off)					
Pierre Faber	22			**3** (substituted off)	**3** (substituted off)	**3** (substituted off)	**3** (substituted off)						
Tim Kasten	23	**6** (substituted off)	**6** (substituted off) (substituted on)	**6** (yellow card)	**6**	**6** (yellow card)	**6**						
Timur Tekkal							**8** (substituted off)						
Colin Grzanna	26		**12**		**12**	**13**	**10**						
Lars Eckert	22	**17** (substituted on) (yellow card)	20	**21** (substituted on)	**21** (substituted on)	**12** (substituted off)	**19** (substituted on)						
Sebastien Chaule	15						**20** (substituted on)						
Thorsten Wiedemann	6	**10** (substituted off)	**10**	**15**	**22** (substituted on)	**21** (substituted on)	21						
Benjamin Danso	13	**19** (substituted on)	18	**18** (substituted on)		**18** (substituted on)							
Marten Strauch	8	**13**	**21** (substituted on)	**22** (substituted on)									
Gerrit van Look	17	**8**	**7**										
Matthieu Franke	10		**14** (substituted off)										
Christian Baracat	5	**3** (substituted off)	**16** (substituted on) (substituted off)										
Markus Walger	17		**22** (substituted on)										
Juan Martin Goity	1	**11** (substituted off)											
Udo Schwarz	1	**14**											

- Number of caps as of end of ENC campaign, 20 March 2010, not overall
- **Bold** numbers indicate player played in the game
- Italics indicates did not play
- denotes substituted off
- denotes substituted on
- (c) denotes captain
- (yellow card) denotes sin bin

=== Scorers (ENC) ===
==== Try scorers ====
Tries	Name	Pld
2	Benjamin Krause	10
1	Benjamin Brierley	4
1	Clemens von Grumbkow	10
1	Mark Sztyndera	3
1	Thorsten Wiedemann	4

==== Points scorers ====
Points	Name	Pld
11	Thorsten Wiedemann	4
10	Benjamin Krause	10
9	Kieron Davies	9
7	Fabian Heimpel	2
6	Mustafa Güngör	10
5	Benjamin Brierley	4
5	Clemens von Grumbkow	10
5	Mark Sztyndera	3

=== Scorers (Friendlies) ===
==== Try scorers ====
Tries	Name	Pld
1	Domenick Davies	1
1	Benjamin Krause	2
1	Alexander Pipa	1
1	Benjamin Simm	1

==== Points scorers ====
Points	Name	Pld
9	Kieron Davies	2
9	Thorsten Wiedemann	1
5	Domenick Davies	1
5	Benjamin Krause	2
5	Alexander Pipa	1
5	Benjamin Simm	1
