= Anjo Buckman =

Germany international rugby union player

Anjo Buckmann
- Born: Anjo Buckmann; 1 March 1989 (age 37)
- Height: 1.92 m (6 ft 4 in)
- Weight: 105 kg (16 st 7 lb)

Rugby union career
- Position: Centre
Amateur team(s)
| Years | Team | Apps | (Points) |
- Hoer-Volks-School Falkon's
Senior career
| Years | Team | Apps | (Points) |
| 2009 | TSV H | | |
| 2009 - | HRK | 53 | (125) |
- Correct as of 11 May 2012
International career
| Years | Team | Apps | (Points) |
| 2009 - | Germany | 9 | (0) |
- Correct as of 28 April 2013

Anjo Buckmann (born 1 March 1989) is a German international rugby union player, playing for the TSV Handschuhsheim in the Rugby-Bundesliga and the German national rugby union team.

== Biography ==
Buckmann played in the 2010, 2011 and 2012 German championship final for Heidelberger RK, with the club winning all of them. He made his debut for Germany in a friendly against Hong Kong on 12 December 2009.

Buckmann left the TSV Handschuhsheim at the end of the 2008–09 season to join the Heidelberger RK. He was part of a group of German players which were sent to South Africa in 2009 to improve their rugby skills at the Sharks Academy as part of the Wild Rugby Academy program.

Buckman competed for Germany at the 2022 Rugby World Cup Sevens in Cape Town.

== Honours ==
=== Club ===
- German rugby union championship
  - Winners: 2010, 2011, 2012
- German rugby union cup
  - Champions: 2010, 2011
  - Runners up: 2009

== Stats ==
Anjo Buckmann's personal statistics in club and international rugby:

=== Club ===
| Year | Club | Division | Games | Tries | Con | Pen | DG | Place |
|---|---|---|---|---|---|---|---|---|
| 2008-09 | TSV Handschuhsheim | Rugby-Bundesliga | 7 | 2 | 0 | 0 | 0 | 6th |
| 2009-10 | Heidelberger RK | Rugby-Bundesliga | 18 | 5 | 0 | 0 | 0 | 3rd — Champions |
| 2010-11 | Heidelberger RK | Rugby-Bundesliga | 18 | 11 | 0 | 0 | 0 | 1st — Champions |
| 2011-12 | Heidelberger RK | Rugby-Bundesliga | 16 | 9 | 0 | 0 | 0 | 1st — Champions |

- As of 11 May 2012

=== National team ===
==== European Nations Cup ====
| Year | Team | Competition | Games | Points | Place |
|---|---|---|---|---|---|
| 2008-2010 | Germany | European Nations Cup First Division | 1 | 0 | 6th — Relegated |
| 2010–2012 | Germany | European Nations Cup Division 1B | 4 | 0 | 4th |
| 2012–2014 | Germany | European Nations Cup Division 1B | 2 | 0 | ongoing |

==== Friendlies & other competitions ====
| Year | Team | Competition | Games | Points |
|---|---|---|---|---|
| 2009 | Germany | Friendly | 1 | 0 |
| 2010 | Germany | Friendly | 1 | 0 |

- As of 28 April 2013
