= Mark Sztyndera =

Germany international rugby union player

- Born: Mark Sztyndera; 28 February 1986 (age 40) Frankfurt am Main
- Height: 1.87 m (6 ft 2 in)
- Weight: 97 kg (15 st 4 lb)

Rugby union career
- Position: Wing
Senior career
Years	Team	Apps	(Points)
- Eintracht
2009	RKH		
2009 – 2012	SC 1880	47	(260)
2012–present	Niort		
- Correct as of 30 April 2012
International career
Years	Team	Apps	(Points)
2009–present	Germany	20	(20)
- Correct as of 28 April 2013
National sevens team
Years	Team		Comps
- Germany 7's

Mark Sztyndera (born 28 February 1986) is a German international rugby union player, playing for Stade Niortais and the German national rugby union team.

Sztyndera played in the 2010 and 2011 German championship final for SC 1880 Frankfurt, both of which the club lost.

Sztyndera joined multiple German champions SC 1880 Frankfurt at the end of the 2008–09 season, leaving his previous club, the RK Heusenstamm. He originally hails from the rugby department of Eintracht Frankfurt. After the 2011–12 season he left Frankfurt to join French side Niortais to play alongside another German international, Robert Mohr.

He made his debut for Germany in a friendly against Hong Kong on 12 December 2009.

Sztyndera has also played for the Germany's 7's side in the past, like at the 2009 London Sevens.

With thirteen tries, he was his club's best try scorer in the 2009–10 season.

== Honors ==
=== Club ===
- German rugby union championship
  - Runners up: 2010
- German sevens championship
  - Runners-up: 2009
- German rugby union cup
  - Winners: 2010

== Stats ==
Mark Sztyndera's personal statistics in club and international rugby:

=== Club ===
Year	Club	Division	Games	Tries	Con	Pen	DG	Place
2008–09	RK Heusenstamm	Rugby-Bundesliga	14	9	8	7	0	7th
2009–10	SC 1880 Frankfurt	Rugby-Bundesliga	17	13	16	12	0	1st – Runners-up
2010–11	SC 1880 Frankfurt	Rugby-Bundesliga	14	7	4	2	0	2nd – Runners up
2011–12	SC 1880 Frankfurt	Rugby-Bundesliga	16	6	15	6	0	2nd – Semi-finals

- As of 30 April 2012

=== National team ===
==== European Nations Cup ====
Year	Team	Competition	Games	Points	Place
2008–2010	Germany	European Nations Cup First Division	3	5	6th – Relegated
2010–2012	Germany	European Nations Cup Division 1B	2	0	4th
2012–2014	Germany	European Nations Cup Division 1B	1	0	ongoing

==== Friendlies & other competitions ====
Year	Team	Competition	Games	Points
2009	Germany	Friendly	1	0
2010	Germany	Friendly	1	0

- As of 28 April 2013
