= Alexander Metz =

- Born: Alexander Metz; 19 March 1987 (age 39)
- Height: 1.94 m (6 ft 4 in)
- Weight: 102 kg (16 st 1 lb)

Rugby union career
- Position: Flanker
Amateur team(s)
| Years | Team | Apps | (Points) |
- TSV Handschuhsheim
- RC Massy Essonne
| ?-2010 | TSV Handschuhsheim | | |
| 2010-2011 | RG Heidelberg | | |
| 2011- | Northwood Crusaders | | |
- Correct as of 30 April 2012
International career
| Years | Team | Apps | (Points) |
| 2010 | Germany | 3 | (0) |
- Correct as of 23 March 2010

Alexander Metz (born 19 March 1987) is a German international rugby union player, playing for the RG Heidelberg in the Rugby-Bundesliga and the German national rugby union team.

He plays rugby since 1991.

He made his debut for Germany against Romania on 13 February 2010.

Metz was part of a group of German players who were sent to South Africa in 2009 to improve their rugby skills at the Sharks Academy as part of the Wild Rugby Academy program. He was also the captain of the German under-21 team. At the end of the 2010–11 season he left Germany again to study in Durban, South Africa.

== Honours ==
=== Club ===
- German rugby union cup
  - Winners: 2008
  - Runners up: 2009

== Stats ==
Alexander Metz's personal statistics in club and international rugby:

=== Club ===
| Year | Club | Division | Games | Tries | Con | Pen | DG | Place |
|---|---|---|---|---|---|---|---|---|
| 2008-09 | TSV Handschuhsheim | Rugby-Bundesliga | 8 | 1 | 0 | 0 | 0 | 6th |
| 2009-10 | TSV Handschuhsheim | Rugby-Bundesliga | 8 | 1 | 0 | 0 | 0 | 4th — Semi-finals |
| 2010-11 | RG Heidelberg | Rugby-Bundesliga | 3 | 1 | 0 | 0 | 0 | 4th — Semi-finals |

- As of 25 August 2011

=== National team ===
| Year | Team | Competition | Games | Points | Place |
|---|---|---|---|---|---|
| 2008-2010 | Germany | European Nations Cup First Division | 3 | 0 | 6th — Relegated |

- As of 21 December 2010
