= Alexander Pipa =

Germany international rugby union player

- Born: Alexander Pipa; 12 June 1983 (age 43) Heidelberg, Germany
- Height: 1.84 m (6 ft 0 in)
- Weight: 98 kg (15 st 6 lb)
- Occupation: Banker

Rugby union career
- Position: Flanker
Amateur team(s)
| Years | Team | Apps | (Points) |
| 2011 | TSV Handschuhsheim | | |
- Correct as of 5 March 2010
International career
| Years | Team | Apps | (Points) |
- Germany
- Correct as of 21 March 2010
National sevens team
| Years | Team | | Comps |
- Germany 7's

Alexander Pipa (born 12 June 1983) is a retired German international rugby union player, playing for the TSV Handschuhsheim in the Rugby-Bundesliga and the German national rugby union team.

He was born in Heidelberg, and has been playing rugby since 1996.

Pipa has also played for the Germany's 7's side in the past, like at the 2008 and 2009 Hannover Sevens and the 2009 London Sevens. He was also part of the German Sevens side at the World Games 2005 in Duisburg, where Germany finished 8th.

In the 2008–09 and 2009-10 seasons, Pipa was the top try scorer in the Bundesliga with 22 tries in each season. After the 2010-11 season, Pipa retired from the sport to concentrate on his private life and his job career.

== Honours ==
=== Club ===
- German rugby union championship
  - Runners up: 2005
- German rugby union cup
  - Winners: 2005

=== National team ===
- European Nations Cup - Division 2
  - Champions: 2008

=== Personal ===
- Rugby-Bundesliga
  - Top try scorer: 2008-09, 2009–10

== Stats ==
Alexander Pipa's personal statistics in club and international rugby:

=== Club ===
| Year | Club | Division | Games | Tries | Con | Pen | DG | Place |
|---|---|---|---|---|---|---|---|---|
| 2008-09 | TSV Handschuhsheim | Rugby-Bundesliga | 13 | 22 | 0 | 0 | 0 | 6th |
| 2009-10 | TSV Handschuhsheim | Rugby-Bundesliga | 18 | 22 | 0 | 0 | 0 | 4th — Semi-finals |
| 2010-11 | TSV Handschuhsheim | Rugby-Bundesliga | 15 | 12 | 0 | 0 | 0 | 3rd — Semi-finals |

- As of 21 August 2011

=== National team ===
==== European Nations Cup ====
| Year | Team | Competition | Games | Points | Place |
|---|---|---|---|---|---|
| 2006-2008 | Germany | European Nations Cup Second Division | 2 | 0 | Champions |
| 2008-2010 | Germany | European Nations Cup First Division | 3 | 0 | 6th — Relegated |

==== Friendlies & other competitions ====
| Year | Team | Competition | Games | Points |
|---|---|---|---|---|
| 2007 | Germany | Friendly | 1 | 5 |
| 2009 | Germany | Friendly | 1 | 5 |

- As of 21 March 2010
