= Benjamin Brierley (rugby union) =

German rugby player (born 1986)

- Born: Benjamin Brierley; 20 December 1976 (age 49) Devizes, Wiltshire, England
- Height: 1.70 m (5 ft 7 in)
- Weight: 97 kg (15 st 4 lb)

Rugby union career
- Position: Wing
Amateur team(s)
Years	Team	Apps	(Points)
- Loughborough University
–	SC 1880 Frankfurt		
- Correct as of 23 March 2010
Senior career
Years	Team	Apps	(Points)
- Wootton Bassett
–	Bristol		
–	Devizes		
–	Ampthill		
International career
Years	Team	Apps	(Points)
2009	Germany	5	(5)
- Correct as of 23 March 2010

Benjamin Brierley (born 20 December 1986) is a German international rugby union player, having last played for the Ampthill RUFC in the National League 3 Midlands and the German national rugby union team.

He has played rugby since 1980. Brierley, born in England, qualified to play for Germany because he spent the necessary number of years playing in the country, for SC 1880 Frankfurt. He returned to his home country after the 2008–09 season, having won a number of titles with Frankfurt. At the end of the 2009–10 season, where he was unable to play many games because of study commitments, Brierley decided to return to Germany, if able to find employment there.

He made his debut for Germany against Georgia on 7 February 2009 and was player of the year in the World Cup Qualifier games.

== Honours ==
=== Club ===
- German rugby union championship
  - Champions: 2008, 2009
  - Runners up: 2007
- German rugby union cup
  - Winners: 2007, 2009

== Stats ==
Benjamin Brierley's personal statistics in club and international rugby:

=== Club ===
Year	Club	Division	Games	Tries	Con	Pen	DG	Place
2008–09	SC 1880 Frankfurt	Rugby-Bundesliga	14	5	0	0	0	1st — Champions
2009–10	Ampthill RUFC	National League 3 Midlands		9	0	0	0	1st — Champions

- As of 23 March 2010

=== National team ===
==== European Nations Cup ====
Year	Team	Competition	Games	Points	Place
2008-2010	Germany	European Nations Cup First Division	4	5	6th — Relegated

==== Friendlies & other competitions ====
Year	Team	Competition	Games	Points
2009	Germany	Friendly	1	0

- As of 23 March 2010
