= Lukas Hinds-Johnson =

German rugby union player

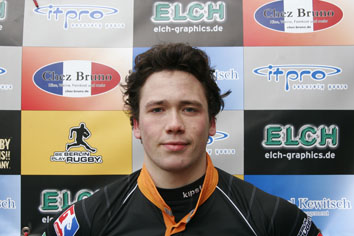
- Lukas Hinds-Johnson
- Born: Lukas Hinds-Johnson; 25 December 1988 (age 37)
- Height: 1.93 m (6 ft 4 in)
- Weight: 102 kg (16 st 1 lb)

Rugby union career
- Position: Lock
Senior career
Years	Team	Apps	(Points)
2009	HRC		
2009 - present	RK 03	35	(25)
- Correct as of 30 April 2012
International career
Years	Team	Apps	(Points)
2010	Germany	6	(0)
- Correct as of 8 April 2012

Lukas Hinds-Johnson (born 25 December 1988) is a German international rugby union player, playing for the RK 03 Berlin in the Rugby-Bundesliga and the German national rugby union team.

== Career ==
Hinds-Johnson started his career with the Hamburger RC at the age of 14. He was part of a group of German players which were sent to South Africa in 2009 to improve their rugby skills at the Sharks Academy as part of the Wild Rugby Academy program. He spent six months in South Africa, together with Benjamin Ulrich from RK 03 Berlin and decided upon his return to Germany to move to Berlin and join RK 03.

He made his debut for Germany against Georgia on 6 February 2010.

== Stats ==
Lukas Hinds-Johnson's personal statistics in club and international rugby:

=== Club ===
Year	Club	Division	Games	Tries	Con	Pen	DG	Place
2008-09	Hamburger RC	2nd Rugby-Bundesliga						8th
2009-10	RK 03 Berlin	Rugby-Bundesliga	12	2	0	0	0	7th
2010-11	RK 03 Berlin	Rugby-Bundesliga	12	0	0	0	0	8th
2011-12	RK 03 Berlin	Rugby-Bundesliga	11	3	0	0	0	8th

- As of 29 April 2012

=== National team ===
==== European Nations Cup ====
Year	Team	Competition	Games	Points	Place
2008-2010	Germany	European Nations Cup First Division	3	0	6th — Relegated
2010–2012	Germany	European Nations Cup Division 1B	2	0	4th

==== Friendlies & other competitions ====
Year	Team	Competition	Games	Points
2010	Germany	Friendly	1	0

- As of 8 April 2012
