= Christopher Weselek =

German rugby union player

- Born: Christopher Weselek; 27 July 1981 (age 45) Essen, Germany
- Height: 1.85 m (6 ft 1 in)
- Weight: 90 kg (14 st 2 lb; 198 lb)
- Occupation: Police officer

Rugby union career
- Position: Wing
Amateur team(s)
Years	Team	Apps	(Points)
1991 - 2001	RG Heidelberg		
2001 - 2002	Old Wesley		
2002 - 2010	RG Heidelberg		
- Correct as of 4 March 2010
International career
Years	Team	Apps	(Points)
	Germany	28	
- Correct as of 21 March 2010
National sevens team
Years	Team		Comps
- Germany 7's

Christopher Weselek (born 27 July 1981 in Essen) is a rugby coach and retired German international rugby union player, having last played for the RG Heidelberg in the Rugby-Bundesliga and the German national rugby union team. He is currently one of the successful rugby coaches in Germany.

He plays rugby since 1991, when he joined the RG Heidelberg through the English Institute in Heidelberg. He played for the RG throughout his career, with the exception of spending a year in Ireland and playing for Old Wesley there. With RGH Weselek won twice the German 15er side championship, 4 times the German 7er side Championship in one time the German Pokal.

Weselek originally retired from the German national team after the Netherlands game on 26 April 2008, his 25th international, but returned to the struggling German side for the game against Portugal on 27 February 2010.

Weselek has also played for the Germany's 7's side in the past, like at the 2008 and 2009 Hannover Sevens and the 2009 London Sevens. Weselek has 30 international 15er side caps and played over 20 international 7er side tournaments.

Since 2012 he is head coach of the Rudergesellschaft Heidelberg. Under his coaching the RGH won the German 7er side championship in 2015, 2016 and 2017. Weselek also coached the German unter 19 Team during the European championship in Portugal in 2015 where Germany ended up 5th place.

== Honours ==
=== Club ===
- German rugby union championship
  - Champions: 2006, 2007
  - Runners up: 2008
- German rugby union cup
  - Winners: 2004

=== National team ===
- European Nations Cup - Division 2
  - Champions: 2008

== Stats ==
Christopher Weselek's personal statistics in club and international rugby:

=== Club ===
Year	Club	Division	Games	Tries	Con	Pen	DG	Place
2007-08	RG Heidelberg	Rugby-Bundesliga	8					2nd — Runners-up
2008-09	RG Heidelberg	Rugby-Bundesliga	1	0	0	0	0	5th
2009-10	RG Heidelberg	Rugby-Bundesliga	12	4	0	0	0	2nd — Semi-finals

- As of 23 December 2010

=== National team ===
==== European Nations Cup ====
Year	Team	Competition	Games	Points	Place
2006-2008	Germany	European Nations Cup Second Division	8	0	Champions
2008-2010	Germany	European Nations Cup First Division	3	0	6th — Relegated

==== Friendlies & other competitions ====
Year	Team	Competition	Games	Points
2007	Germany	Friendly	2	0

- As of 21 March 2010
