= Benjamin Ulrich =

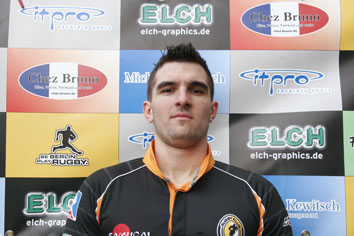
- Benjamin Ulrich
- Born: Benjamin Ulrich; January 20, 1988 (age 38)
- Height: 1.87 m (6 ft 2 in)
- Weight: 95 kg (14 st 13 lb)

Rugby union career
- Position: Centre
Amateur team(s)
Years	Team	Apps	(Points)
- RK 03 Berlin
- Correct as of 22 March 2010
International career
Years	Team	Apps	(Points)
2009 -	Germany	2	(0)
- Correct as of 22 March 2010

Benjamin Ulrich (born 20 January 1988) is a German international rugby union player, playing for the RK 03 Berlin in the Rugby-Bundesliga and the German national rugby union team.

He is playing rugby since 1999.

Ulrich was part of a group of German players which were sent to South Africa in 2009 to improve their rugby skills at the Sharks Academy as part of the Wild Rugby Academy program. He spent six months in South Africa, together with Lukas Hinds-Johnson, another player of RK 03 Berlin.

Ulrich made his debut for Germany in a friendly against Hong Kong on 12 December 2009.

== Stats ==
Benjamin Ulrich's personal statistics in club and international rugby:

=== Club ===
Year	Club	Division	Games	Tries	Con	Pen	DG	Place
2008-09	RK 03 Berlin	Rugby-Bundesliga	12	3	0	0	0	8th
2009-10	RK 03 Berlin	Rugby-Bundesliga	14	9	0	0	0	7th
2010-11	RK 03 Berlin	Rugby-Bundesliga	15	4	0	0	0	8th
2011-12	RK 03 Berlin	Rugby-Bundesliga	10	7	0	0	0	8th

- As of 30 April 2012

=== National team ===
==== European Nations Cup ====
Year	Team	Competition	Games	Points	Place
2008-2010	Germany	European Nations Cup First Division	1	0	6th — Relegated

==== Friendlies & other competitions ====
Year	Team	Competition	Games	Points
2009	Germany	Friendly	1	0

- As of 22 March 2010
