= Thorsten Wiedemann =

German rugby union player (born 1985)

- Born: Thorsten Wiedemann; October 4, 1985 (age 41)
- Height: 1.80 m (5 ft 11 in)
- Weight: 85 kg (13 st 5 lb)

Rugby union career
- Position: Fly-half
Amateur team(s)
Years	Team	Apps	(Points)
2006	Heidelberger RK		
2007	Hamilton Marist RFC		
2007 - 2009	TSV Handschuhsheim		
2009 - 2010	Heidelberger RK USC Rugby		
2010 - 2012	Heidelberger RK		
- Correct as of 25 June 2012
Senior career
Years	Team	Apps	(Points)
2010 -	Sunshine Coast Stingrays		
International career
Years	Team	Apps	(Points)
2007 - 2009	Germany	6	(24)
- Correct as of 18 March 2010

Thorsten Wiedemann (born 4 October 1985) is a German international rugby union player, playing for the Heidelberger RK in the Rugby-Bundesliga and the German national rugby union team.

== Biography ==
Wiedemann grew up in Heidelberg, playing rugby for the Heidelberger RK. He joined TSV Handschuhsheim for two seasons, alongside his coach, in August 2007. He spend some time in New Zealand in 2007 playing for the Hamilton Marist RFC.

He made his debut for Germany on 29 September 2007 in a friendly against Switzerland. He made his last game for Germany to date against Portugal on 21 February 2009. He was also part of the squad for the Russia game on 2 May 2009 but was not substituted in.

In the 2008–09 season, while playing for the TSV Handschuhsheim, he was the top-scorer in the Bundesliga with 212 points. He joined the Heidelberger RK for the 2009–10 season but emigrated to Australia during the winter break. He now plays for the Sunshine Coast Stingrays in Queensland Premier Rugby.

After two years in Australia Wiedemann rejoined Heidelberger RK for the 2012-13 Bundesliga season.

== Honours ==
=== Club ===
- German rugby union cup
  - Winners: 2008
  - Runners-up: 2009

=== Personal ===
- Rugby-Bundesliga
  - Top scorer: 2008-09

== Stats ==
Thorsten Wiedemann's personal statistics in club and international rugby:

=== Club ===
Year	Club	Division	Games	Tries	Con	Pen	DG	Place
2008-09	TSV Handschuhsheim	Rugby-Bundesliga	16	4	44	34	1	6th
2009-10	Heidelberger RK	Rugby-Bundesliga	11	2	32	18	0	3rd
2010	Sunshine Coast Stingrays	Queensland Premier Rugby						
2011	USC Rugby	Sunshine Coast RU						
2012-13	Heidelberger RK	Rugby-Bundesliga						

- As of 25 June 2012

=== National team ===
==== European Nations Cup ====
Year	Team	Competition	Games	Points	Place
2008-2010	Germany	European Nations Cup First Division	4	11	6th — Relegated

==== Friendlies & other competitions ====
Year	Team	Competition	Games	Points
2007	Germany	Friendly	1	4
2008	Germany	Friendly	1	9

- As of 18 March 2010
