= Colin Grzanna =

Germany international rugby union player

- Born: Colin Grzanna; 5 November 1979 (age 47) Berlin, Germany
- Height: 1.91 m (6 ft 3 in)
- Weight: 96 kg (15 st 2 lb)
- University: Charite Universitätsmedizin
- Occupation: Surgeon

Rugby union career
- Position: Centre
Amateur team(s)
Years	Team	Apps	(Points)
1984–99	Berliner RC		
2000	Northwood Crusaders		
2001–present	Berliner RC		
International career
Years	Team	Apps	(Points)
– 2009	Germany	26	
- Correct as of 25 February 2010
National sevens team
Years	Team		Comps
- Germany 7's
Coaching career
- Years: Team
- Berliner RC

Colin Grzanna is a German international rugby union player, playing for the Berliner RC in the Rugby-Bundesliga and the German national rugby union team. He is captain and player-coach of his club team and has also captained the German team at times.

== Biography ==
Colin Grzanna started playing rugby when he was five years old, in 1984, playing with his South African cousins.

He is currently playing for Berliner Rugby Club, where he also covers a coaching role, together with Gerrit van Look, another player of the German national team.

Although playing for Berlin for the most part of his career, Grzanna spent the 2000 season with the Northwood Crusaders in Durban, South Africa before returning to Berlin again.

He was part of the German Sevens side at the World Games 2005 in Duisburg, where Germany finished 8th.

He filled in as German captain for an injured Jens Schmidt in late 2007 and early 2008. Himself injured later in the year, suffering a broken hand and requiring pins after the game against SC Neuenheim on 13 September 2008, he planned to retire from the national team but, according to his captain Schmidt, he loves the game too much and Germany needs his skills too badly for him to retire.

His greatest success as a national team player was the promotion to Division 1 of the European Nations Cup in 2008. In an interview after the promotion-winning game, which he captained, he stated that, in his opinion, this was the greatest moment in German rugby in almost 30 years.

Grzanna voiced his anger with the image of the game in Germany, where it is often unfairly associated with only being played by rough individuals. He considers it the perfect game, as – he says – there is a position for everybody in the game, regardless of someone's size or height.

Grzanna last played for Germany on 2 May 2009, against Russia, and has since retired from the national team.

== Personal life ==
Like most of his fellow German team mates, Grzanna is an amateur rugby player and a surgeon by profession. He studied human medicine at the Charite Universitätsmedizin in Berlin from 2000 to 2007 and now works as a consultant surgeon. Apart from German, he is also fluent in English and French.

== Honours ==
=== National team ===
- European Nations Cup – Division 2
  - Champions: 2008

== Stats ==
Colin Grzanna's personal statistics in club and international rugby:

=== Club ===
Year	Club	Division	Games	Tries	Con	Pen	DG	Place
2008–09	Berliner RC	Rugby-Bundesliga	10	6	2	1	3	4th – Semi-finals
2009–10	Berliner RC	Rugby-Bundesliga	11	13	11	8	0	6th
2010–11	Berliner RC	Rugby-Bundesliga	9	2	6	4	1	6th
2011–12	Berliner RC	Rugby-Bundesliga	3	2	7	2	2	9th

- As of 30 April 2012

=== National team ===
==== European Nations Cup ====
Year	Team	Competition	Games	Points	Place
2006–2008	Germany	European Nations Cup Second Division	8	18	Champions
2008–2010	Germany	European Nations Cup First Division	4	0	6th – Relegated

==== Friendlies & other competitions ====
Year	Team	Competition	Games	Points
2007	Germany	Friendly	2	0

- As of 25 February 2010
