= Lukas Rosenthal =

German rugby union player

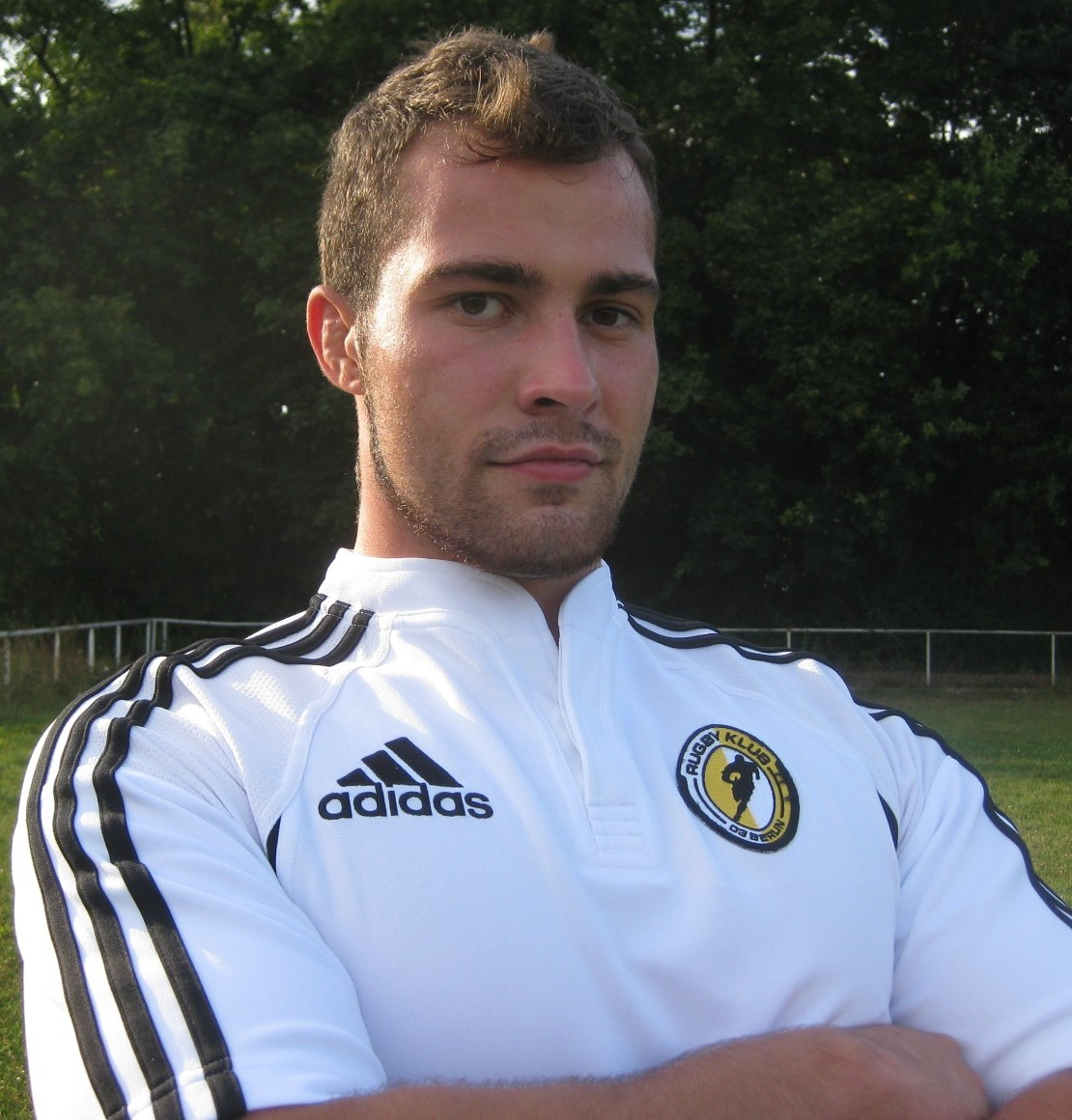
- Lukas Rosenthal
- Born: Lukas Rosenthal; July 7, 1988 (age 38)
- Height: 1.94 m (6 ft 4 in)
- Weight: 105 kg (16 st 7 lb)

Rugby union career
- Position: Number eight
Senior career
Years	Team	Apps	(Points)
- RK 03
2011 - present	TSV H	9	(5)
- Correct as of 30 April 2012
International career
Years	Team	Apps	(Points)
2010	Germany	1	(0)
- Correct as of 23 March 2010

Lukas Rosenthal (born 7 July 1988) is a German international rugby union player, playing for the TSV Handschuhsheim in the Rugby-Bundesliga and the German national rugby union team.

He has played rugby since 2000.

He made his debut for Germany against Georgia on 6 February 2010.

After a number of seasons with RK 03 Berlin, Rosenthal opted to join TSV Handschuhsheim for 2011-12.

== Honors ==
=== Club ===
- 2nd Rugby-Bundesliga
  - Champions: 2008

== Stats ==
Lukas Rosenthal's personal statistics in club and international rugby:

=== Club ===
Year	Club	Division	Games	Tries	Con	Pen	DG	Place
2008-09	RK 03 Berlin	Rugby-Bundesliga	13	1	0	0	0	8th
2009-10	RK 03 Berlin	Rugby-Bundesliga	13	2	0	0	0	7th
2010-11	RK 03 Berlin	Rugby-Bundesliga	5	2	0	0	0	8th
2011-12	TSV Handschuhsheim	Rugby-Bundesliga	9	1	0	0	0	5th

- As of 30 April 2012

=== National team ===
Year	Team	Competition	Games	Points	Place
2008-2010	Germany	European Nations Cup First Division	1	0	6th — Relegated

- As of 23 March 2010
