= Alexander Hug (rugby union) =

- Born: Alexander Hug; 29 August 1984 (age 42)
- Height: 1.88 m (6 ft 2 in)
- Weight: 91 kg (14 st 5 lb)

Rugby union career
- Position: Flanker
Senior career
Years	Team	Apps	(Points)
- RGH
–	TSV H		
International career
Years	Team	Apps	(Points)
2007 -	Germany	18	(5)
- Correct as of 28 April 2013

Alexander Hug (born 29 August 1984) is a German international rugby union player, playing for the TSV Handschuhsheim in the Rugby-Bundesliga and the German national rugby union team.

He made his debut for Germany in a friendly against Switzerland on 29 September 2007.

== Honours ==
=== Club ===
- German rugby union cup
  - Runners up: 2009

== Stats ==
Alexander Hug's personal statistics in club and international rugby:

=== Club ===
Year	Club	Division	Games	Tries	Con	Pen	DG	Place
2008-09	TSV Handschuhsheim	Rugby-Bundesliga	11	4	0	0	0	6th
2009-10	TSV Handschuhsheim	Rugby-Bundesliga	15	4	0	0	0	4th — Semi-finals
2010-11	TSV Handschuhsheim	Rugby-Bundesliga	16	2	0	0	0	3rd — Semi-finals
2011-12	TSV Handschuhsheim	Rugby-Bundesliga	17	6	0	0	0	5th

- As of 30 April 2012

=== National team ===
==== European Nations Cup ====
Year	Team	Competition	Games	Points	Place
2008-2010	Germany	European Nations Cup First Division	4	0	6th — Relegated
2010–2012	Germany	European Nations Cup Division 1B	5	0	4th
2012–2014	Germany	European Nations Cup Division 1B	5	5	ongoing

==== Friendlies & other competitions ====
Year	Team	Competition	Games	Points
2007	Germany	Friendly	1	0
2008	Germany	Friendly	1	0
2009	Germany	Friendly	1	0
2010	Germany	Friendly	1	0

- As of 28 April 2013
