= Michael Poppmeier =

Germany international rugby union player

- Born: Michael Poppmeier; 24 July 1982 (age 44) Durban, South Africa
- Height: 1.97 m (6 ft 5 1/2 in)
- Weight: 112 kg (17 st 9 lb)

Rugby union career
- Position: Lock
Amateur team(s)
Years	Team	Apps	(Points)
- DRC Hannover
–	Villagers		
–	False Bay Rugby Football Club		
–	SC 1880 Frankfurt		
- Correct as of 20 March 2010
Senior career
Years	Team	Apps	(Points)
2007–2008	Rosslyn Park F.C.		
–	Lazio Rugby		
–	San Gregorio Catania		
–	Heidelberger RK		
International career
Years	Team	Apps	(Points)
2009–2019	Germany	28	(20)
- Correct as of 10 November 2017

Michael Poppmeier (born 24 July 1982 in Durban) is a German international rugby union player, playing for the Villagers in South Africa and the German national rugby union team.

He returned to the German side against Georgia on 7 February 2009 after a five-year absence, having made his last international in 2004.

Poppmeier, born in South Africa, started playing rugby in 2000. He has played for Villagers, DRC Hannover, Rosslyn Park F.C., Lazio Rugby and San Gregorio Rugby so far.

== Stats ==
Michael Poppmeier's personal statistics in club and international rugby:

=== National team ===
Year	Team	Competition	Games	Points	Place
2008–10	Germany	European Nations Cup First Division	4	0	6th — Relegated
2010–12	Germany	European Nations Cup Division 1B	2	0	4th

- As of 8 April 2012
