= Patrick Schliwa =

Germany international rugby union player

- Born: Patrick Schliwa; 8 April 1985 (age 41)
- Height: 1.80 m (5 ft 11 in)
- Weight: 115 kg (18 st 2 lb)

Rugby union career
- Position: Prop
Senior career
Years	Team	Apps	(Points)
- HRK
International career
Years	Team	Apps	(Points)
2009 -	Germany	6	(0)
- Correct as of 8 April 2012

Patrick Schliwa (born 8 April 1985) is a German international rugby union player, playing for the Heidelberger RK in the Rugby-Bundesliga and the German national rugby union team.

Schliwa played in the 2009, 2010, 2011 and 2012 German championship final for Heidelberger RK, losing the first one and winning the following three. Schliwa scored a try in the lost 2009 final, the only one for HRK in the game.

He made his debut for Germany in a friendly against Hong Kong on 12 December 2009.

== Honours ==
=== Club ===
- German rugby union championship
  - Champions: 2010, 2011, 2012
  - Runners up: 2009
- German rugby union cup
  - Winners: 2011

== Stats ==
Patrick Schliwa's personal statistics in club and international rugby:

=== Club ===
Year	Club	Division	Games	Tries	Con	Pen	DG	Place
2008-09	Heidelberger RK	Rugby-Bundesliga	17	2	0	0	0	2nd — Runners-up
2009-10	Heidelberger RK	Rugby-Bundesliga	19	2	0	0	0	3rd — Champions
2010-11	Heidelberger RK	Rugby-Bundesliga	17	4	0	0	0	1st — Champions
2011-12	Heidelberger RK	Rugby-Bundesliga	15	1	0	0	0	1st — Champions

- As of 11 May 2012

=== National team ===
==== European Nations Cup ====
Year	Team	Competition	Games	Points	Place
2008-2010	Germany	European Nations Cup First Division	1	0	6th — Relegated
2010–2012	Germany	European Nations Cup Division 1B	3	0	4th

==== Friendlies & other competitions ====
Year	Team	Competition	Games	Points
2009	Germany	Friendly	1	0
2010	Germany	Friendly	1	0

- As of 8 April 2012
