= Jamie Houston =

Germany international rugby union player

- Born: Jamie Houston; 5 August 1982 (age 44) England
- Height: 1.82 m (6 ft 0 in)
- Weight: 89 kg (14 st 0 lb)
- Occupation: Fitness instructor

Rugby union career
- Position: Hooker
Amateur team(s)
Years	Team	Apps	(Points)
????	Dunsburgh RFC		
????	Plymouth RFC		
2006 – 2010	SC 1880 Frankfurt		
- Correct as of 15 December 2010
International career
Years	Team	Apps	(Points)
2009–2010	Germany	6	(0)
- Correct as of 15 December 2010
Coaching career
- Years: Team
- 2010 – 2011: SC 1880 Frankfurt II
- 2011 – 2012: RG Heidelberg
- Correct as of 26 August 2011

Jamie Ben Houston (born 5 August 1982) is a retired German international rugby union player, having played for the SC 1880 Frankfurt in the Rugby-Bundesliga and the German national rugby union team. He most recently was coach of RG Heidelberg in the Rugby-Bundesliga.

He made his debut for Germany in a friendly versus Hong Kong on 12 December 2009. Houston, born in England, qualifies to play for Germany after having spent three years playing in the country for the SC 1880 Frankfurt.

Houston played in the 2009 German championship final for SC 1880 Frankfurt, which the club won.

After a neck injury, Houston had to retire from the sport in 2010, pursuing his career as a fitness instructor instead, but remaining in Germany.

After a season as coach of the reserve team of SC 1880 Frankfurt, he took over as head coach of RG Heidelberg for Rudolf Finsterer for the 2011–12 season. At the end of his first season with RGH he was replaced with the club's youth coach Bernd Schöpfel.

== Honours ==
=== Club ===
- German rugby union championship
  - Champions: 2008, 2009
  - Runners up: 2007, 2010
- German rugby union cup
  - Winners: 2009

== Stats ==
Jamie Houston's personal statistics in club and international rugby:

=== Club ===
Year	Club	Division	Games	Tries	Con	Pen	DG	Place
2008–09	SC 1880 Frankfurt	Rugby-Bundesliga	16	4	0	0	0	1st – Champions
2009–10	SC 1880 Frankfurt	Rugby-Bundesliga	15	4	0	0	0	1st – Runners up

- As of 15 December 2010

=== National team ===
==== European Nations Cup ====
Year	Team	Competition	Games	Points	Place
2008–2010	Germany	European Nations Cup First Division	5	0	6th – Relegated

==== Friendlies & other competitions ====
Year	Team	Competition	Games	Points
2009	Germany	Friendly	1	0

- As of 15 December 2010
