= Gerrit van Look =

Germany international rugby union player

- Born: Gerrit van Look; August 13, 1985 (age 41)
- Height: 1.87 m (6 ft 2 in)
- Weight: 97 kg (15 st 4 lb)

Rugby union career
- Position: Flanker
Amateur team(s)
| Years | Team | Apps | (Points) |
- Berliner SV 92 Rugby
| – | Berliner RC | | |
- Correct as of 2 March 2010
International career
| Years | Team | Apps | (Points) |
| 2008 | Germany | 17 | |
- Correct as of 2 March 2010
Coaching career
- Years: Team
- Berliner RC

Gerrit van Look (born 13 August 1985) is a retired German international rugby union player, having last played for the Berliner RC in the Rugby-Bundesliga and the German national rugby union team. He was also, together with Colin Grzanna, for a time the coach of the Berliner RC.

Van Look plays rugby since 1989.

His last game for Germany was against Spain on 15 November 2008 and he has since announced his international retirement. At the end of the 2009-10 season, he and his brother Hendrik retired from club rugby as well.

With eight tries, he was his club's best try scorer in the 2008-09 season.

== Honours ==
=== National team ===
- European Nations Cup - Division 2
  - Champions: 2008

== Stats ==
Gerrit van Look's personal statistics in club and international rugby:

=== Club ===
| Year | Club | Division | Games | Tries | Con | Pen | DG | Place |
|---|---|---|---|---|---|---|---|---|
| 2008-09 | Berliner RC | Rugby-Bundesliga | 17 | 8 | 0 | 0 | 0 | 4th — Semi-finals |
| 2009-10 | Berliner RC | Rugby-Bundesliga | 6 | 2 | 0 | 0 | 0 | 6th |

- As of 17 May 2010

=== National team ===
==== European Nations Cup ====
| Year | Team | Competition | Games | Points | Place |
|---|---|---|---|---|---|
| 2006-2008 | Germany | European Nations Cup Second Division | 8 | 0 | Champions |
| 2008-2010 | Germany | European Nations Cup First Division | 1 | 0 | 6th — Relegated |

==== Friendlies & other competitions ====
| Year | Team | Competition | Games | Points |
|---|---|---|---|---|
| 2007 | Germany | Friendly | 1 | 0 |
| 2008 | Germany | Friendly | 1 | 0 |

- As of 15 December 2010
