= Kieron Davies =

German rugby union player (born 1980)

- Born: Kieron Davies; 8 August 1980 (age 46) 29 the bridle
- Height: 1.73 m (5 ft 8 in)
- Weight: 76 kg (12 st 0 lb)

Rugby union career
- Position: Fullback
Amateur team(s)
Years	Team	Apps	(Points)
- Swanage and Wareham Rugby Club
–	DRC Hannover		
–	RC Arras		
–	RC Compiegne		
–	Bedford Blues		
–	Hertford RFC		
–	Luton RFC		
–	Ampthill & District RFC		
- Correct as of 4 March 2010
International career
Years	Team	Apps	(Points)
	Germany	34	
- Correct as of 8 April 2012

Kieron Davies (born 18 August 1980) is a German international rugby union player of Welsh descent, playing for Ampthill & District RFC and the German national rugby union team. His brother, Domenick Davies, is also a German international.

He has played Rugby since 1987.

In 2009–10, he was the leading points scorers in the National League 3 Midlands with 234 points. In 2010–11, the club, with Davies, plays in the National League 3 London & SE.

== Honours ==
=== National team ===
- European Nations Cup - Division 2
  - Champions: 2008

=== Club ===
- National League 3 Midlands
  - Champions: 2010

== Stats ==
Kieron Davies's personal statistics in club and international rugby:

=== Club ===
Year	Club	Division	Games	Tries	Con	Pen	DG	Place
2009–10	Ampthill RUFC	National League 3 Midlands		7	59	25	2	1st — Champions
2010–11	Ampthill RUFC	National League 3 London & SE		3	16	4	0	ongoing

- As of 13 December 2010

=== National team ===
==== European Nations Cup ====
Year	Team	Competition	Games	Points	Place
2006-2008	Germany	European Nations Cup Second Division	4	9	Champions
2008-2010	Germany	European Nations Cup First Division	9	9	6th — Relegated

==== Friendlies & other competitions ====
Year	Team	Competition	Games	Points
2008	Germany	Friendly	1	0
2009	Germany	Friendly	1	9

- As of 8 April 2012
