= Krystian Trochowski =

German rugby union player and disk jockey

- Born: Krystian Trochowski; November 10, 1985 (age 41) Germany
- Height: 1.83 m (6 ft 0 in)
- Weight: 100 kg (15 st 10 lb)

Rugby union career
- Position: Prop
Amateur team(s)
Years	Team	Apps	(Points)
2011	Berliner RC		
- Correct as of 16 March 2010
International career
Years	Team	Apps	(Points)
2007	Germany		
- Correct as of 16 March 2010

Krystian Trochowski (born 10 November 1985) is a retired German international rugby union player, formerly playing for the Berliner RC in the Rugby-Bundesliga and the German national rugby union team.

He has played rugby since 1999.

His last game for Germany was a friendly against Switzerland on 29 September 2007.

He is the cousin of German international footballer Piotr Trochowski.

== Stats ==
Krystian Trochowski's personal statistics in club and international rugby:

=== Club ===
Year	Club	Division	Games	Tries	Con	Pen	DG	Place
2008-09	Berliner RC	Rugby-Bundesliga	14	0	0	0	0	4th — Semi-finals
2009-10	Berliner RC	Rugby-Bundesliga	12	0	0	0	0	6th
2010-11	Berliner RC	Rugby-Bundesliga	0	0	0	0	0	6th

- As of 30 April 2012

=== National team ===
Year	Team	Competition	Games	Points
2007	Germany	Friendly	2	0

- As of 16 March 2010
