= Gilles Pagnon =

Germany international rugby union player

- Born: Gilles Pagnon; 20 February 1984 (age 42) Germany
- Height: 1.77 m (5 ft 10 in)
- Weight: 84 kg (13 st 3 lb)

Rugby union career
- Position: Centre
- Correct as of 19 March 2010
Senior career
Years	Team	Apps	(Points)
2008	Montois		
2008 - 2009	Hyères		
2009 - 2010	Orléans		
2010 - present	Draguignan		
International career
Years	Team	Apps	(Points)
2010 -	Germany	8	(0)
- Correct as of 8 April 2012

Gilles Pagnon (born 20 February 1984) is a German international rugby union player, playing for RC Orléans in the Fédérale 1 and the German national rugby union team.

Pagnon made his debut for Germany on 13 March 2010 against Russia.

Born in Germany, which made him eligible for the German national team, Pagnon has played in France throughout his career, at RC Carqueiranne-Hyères and RC Orléans in the Fédérale 1 and at Stade Montois in the Pro D2.

== Honors ==
- Rugby Pro D2:
  - Promotion playoff winners: 2008

== Stats ==
Gilles Pagnon's personal statistics in club and international rugby:

=== Club ===
Year	Team	Competition	Games	Points	Place
2007-08	Stade Montois	Pro D2	4	0	3rd
2008-09	RC Carqueiranne-Hyères	Fédérale 1	15	10	
2009-10	RC Orléans	Fédérale 1	8	5	
2010-11	RC Draguignan				

- As of 22 December 2010

=== National team ===
Year	Team	Competition	Games	Points	Place
2008-2010	Germany	European Nations Cup First Division	2	0	6th — Relegated
2010–2012	Germany	European Nations Cup Division 1B	6	0	4th

- As of 8 April 2012
