= Daniel Preussner =

Germany international rugby union player

- Born: Daniel Preussner; 9 August 1986 (age 40)
- Height: 2.00 m (6 ft 7 in)
- Weight: 120 kg (18 st 13 lb; 265 lb)

Rugby union career
- Position: Lock
Senior career
Years	Team	Apps	(Points)
- SC 1880
International career
Years	Team	Apps	(Points)
2009 -	Germany	2	(0)
- Correct as of 24 March 2010

Daniel Preussner (born 9 August 1986) is a German international rugby union player, playing for the SC 1880 Frankfurt in the Rugby-Bundesliga and the German national rugby union team.

He made his debut for Germany in a friendly against Hong Kong on 12 December 2009.

Preussner, together with Rolf Wacha, has been in the line-up of the German championship final from 2008 to 2011.

== Honours ==
=== Club ===
- German rugby union championship
  - Champions: 2008, 2009
  - Runners up: 2010, 2011
- German rugby union cup
  - Winners: 2009, 2010

== Stats ==
Daniel Preussner's personal statistics in club and international rugby:

=== Club ===
Year	Club	Division	Games	Tries	Con	Pen	DG	Place
2008-09	SC 1880 Frankfurt	Rugby-Bundesliga	14	1	0	0	0	1st — Champions
2009-10	SC 1880 Frankfurt	Rugby-Bundesliga	14	1	0	0	0	1st — Runners-up
2010-11	SC 1880 Frankfurt	Rugby-Bundesliga	10	2	0	0	0	2nd — Runners up
2011-12	SC 1880 Frankfurt	Rugby-Bundesliga	7	0	0	0	0	2nd — Semi-finals

- As of 30 April 2012

=== National team ===
==== European Nations Cup ====
Year	Team	Competition	Games	Points	Place
2008-2010	Germany	European Nations Cup First Division	1	0	6th — Relegated

==== Friendlies & other competitions ====
Year	Team	Competition	Games	Points
2009	Germany	Friendly	1	0

- As of 24 March 2010
