= Benjamin Krause =

- Born: Benjamin Krause; 15 November 1982 (age 43)
- Height: 1.83 m (6 ft 0 in)
- Weight: 100 kg (15 st 10 lb; 220 lb)
- Occupation: Auto mechanic

Rugby union career
- Position: Prop
Amateur team(s)
Years	Team	Apps	(Points)
- DSV 78 Hannover
- Correct as of 2 March 2010
International career
Years	Team	Apps	(Points)
2007 - present	Germany	49	
- Correct as of 28 April 2013
National sevens team
Years	Team		Comps
- Germany

Benjamin Krause (born 15 November 1982) is a German international rugby union player, playing for the DSV 78 Hannover in the Rugby-Bundesliga and the German national rugby union team.

He plays rugby since 1993. He made his debut for Germany in a game against a Welsh development side on 24 February 2007.

His club, DSV 78/08 Ricklingen, won the 2nd Bundesliga title in 2008-09 and earned promotion to the Rugby-Bundesliga, now playing as DSV 78 Hannover.

Krause has also played for the Germany's 7's side in the past, like at the 2008 Hannover Sevens.

== Honours ==
=== National team ===
- European Nations Cup - Division 2
  - Champions: 2008

== Stats ==
Benjamin Krause's personal statistics in club and international rugby:

=== Club ===
Year	Club	Division	Games	Tries	Con	Pen	DG	Place
2008-09	DSV 78/08 Ricklingen	2nd Rugby-Bundesliga	13	10	0	0	0	1st
2009-10	DSV 78 Hannover	Rugby-Bundesliga	14	1	0	0	0	9th
2010-11	DSV 78 Hannover	Rugby-Bundesliga	16	2	0	0	0	7th
2011-12	DSV 78 Hannover	Rugby-Bundesliga	16	5	0	0	0	7th
2012-13	DSV 78 Hannover	Rugby-Bundesliga						1st – Quarter finals

- As of 4 December 2013

=== National team ===
==== European Nations Cup ====
Year	Team	Competition	Games	Points	Place
2006-2008	Germany	European Nations Cup Second Division	6	0	Champions
2008-2010	Germany	European Nations Cup First Division	10	10	6th — Relegated
2010–2012	Germany	European Nations Cup Division 1B	7	0	4th
2012–2014	Germany	European Nations Cup Division 1B	3	0	ongoing

==== Friendlies & other competitions ====
Year	Team	Competition	Games	Points
2007	Germany	Friendly	2	0
2008	Germany	Friendly	1	5
2009	Germany	Friendly	1	0
2010	Germany	Friendly	1	0

- As of 4 December 2013
