= Damien Tussac =

Germany international rugby union player

- Born: Damien Tussac; 2 January 1988 (age 38) Avignon, France
- Height: 1.92 m (6 ft 4 in)
- Weight: 128 kg (20 st 2 lb)

Rugby union career
- Position: Prop
Amateur team(s)
Years	Team	Apps	(Points)
Senior career
Years	Team	Apps	(Points)
2004–2006	La Valette-du-Var		
2006–2007	Toulouse		
2007–2008	SC Albi		
2008-2012	Toulon	9	(0)
2012-2014	Leeds Carnegie	30	(0)
2014-2016	US Montauban	45	(10)
2016-	Castres Olympique	21	(0)
International career
Years	Team	Apps	(Points)
2009-	Germany	8	(5)

Damien Tussac (born 2 January 1988) is a rugby union player for Castres Olympique in the Top 14 and the German national rugby union team. He is a French citizen but qualifies to play for Germany because of a German grandmother.

Tussac made his debut for Germany against Georgia on 7 February 2009.

He played junior rugby for La Valette-du-Var, Stade Toulousain and SC Albi before joining RC Toulonnais in 2008. In the 2009–10 season, he has made appearances for the club in league and European Challenge Cup matches, but is still part of the club's under-21 team.

He signed a contract with Toulon in effect to December 2009.

Tussac made his debut for the senior team of RC Toulonnais in the 2010–11 season in a 43–12 win on 23 April 2011 against USA Perpignan. He also appeared once in the Heineken Cup, against the same team and in the same month, but then in an away defeat.

For the 2012–13 season he joined Leeds Carnegie, playing in the RFU Championship.

== Stats ==
Damien Tussac's personal statistics in club and international rugby:

=== Club ===
Year	Club	Division	Games	Tries	Con	Pen	DG	Place
2008–09	RC Toulonnais	Espoirs	9	0	0	0	0	
2009–10	RC Toulonnais	Top 14	0	0	0	0	0	2nd
2010–11	RC Toulonnais	Top 14	1	0	0	0	0	8th
2011–12	RC Toulonnais	Top 14	3	0	0	0	0	3rd
2012–13	Leeds Carnegie	RFU Championship						

- Updated 23 July 2012

=== National team ===
Year	Team	Competition	Games	Points	Place
2008–2010	Germany	European Nations Cup First Division	4	0	6th – Relegated
2010–2012	Germany	European Nations Cup Division 1B	7	0	4th
2012–2014	Germany	European Nations Cup Division 1B	1	0	ongoing

- Updated 28 April 2013
