= Pierre Faber =

German rugby union player (born 1978)

- Born: Pierre Faber; 29 March 1979 (age 47)
- Height: 1.87 m (6 ft 2 in)
- Weight: 118 kg (18 st 8 lb)

Rugby union career
- Position: Prop
Amateur team(s)
Years	Team	Apps	(Points)
2008 - 2010	RG Heidelberg		
- Correct as of 7 March 2010
Senior career
Years	Team	Apps	(Points)
- Dijon
? - 2008	RC Strasbourg		
- Correct as of 7 March 2010
International career
Years	Team	Apps	(Points)
2009	Germany	22	
- Correct as of 7 March 2010

Pierre Faber (born 29 March 1978) is a retired German international rugby union player, playing for the RG Heidelberg in the Rugby-Bundesliga and the German national rugby union team.

His last game for Germany was against Russia on 2 May 2009. Faber ended his rugby career in December 2009.

Of French origin, Faber played rugby for Stade Dijonnais and RC Strasbourg before joining the RG Heidelberg in 2008 for his final rugby years.

== Honours ==
=== National team ===
- European Nations Cup - Division 2
  - Champions: 2008

== Stats ==
Pierre Faber's personal statistics in club and international rugby:

=== Club ===
Year	Club	Division	Games	Tries	Con	Pen	DG	Place
2008-09	RG Heidelberg	Rugby-Bundesliga	9	2	0	0	0	5th
2009-10	RG Heidelberg	Rugby-Bundesliga	4	0	0	0	0	2nd — Semi-finals

- As of 15 December 2010

=== National team ===
Year	Team	Competition	Games	Points	Place
2006-2008	Germany	European Nations Cup Second Division	3	0	Champions
2008-2010	Germany	European Nations Cup First Division	4	0	6th

- As of 15 December 2010
