= Rolf Wacha =

Germany international rugby union player

- Born: Rolf Wacha; June 23, 1981 (age 45)
- Height: 1.92 m (6 ft 4 in)
- Weight: 93 kg (14 st 9 lb)

Rugby union career
- Position: Lock
Senior career
Years	Team	Apps	(Points)
- SC 1880
International career
Years	Team	Apps	(Points)
2007 -	Germany	8	(0)
- Correct as of 21 March 2010

Rolf Wacha (born 23 June 1981) is a German international rugby union player, playing for the SC 1880 Frankfurt in the Rugby-Bundesliga and the German national rugby union team.

He plays rugby since 1999.

He made his debut for Germany in a friendly against Switzerland on 29 September 2007.

Wacha, together with Daniel Preussner, has been in the line-up of the German championship final from 2008 to 2011.

== Honours ==
=== Club ===
- German rugby union championship
  - Champions: 2008, 2009
  - Runners up: 2007, 2010
- German rugby union cup
  - Winners: 2007, 2009

=== National team ===
- European Nations Cup - Division 2
  - Champions: 2008

== Stats ==
Rolf Wacha's personal statistics in club and international rugby:

=== Club ===
Year	Club	Division	Games	Tries	Con	Pen	DG	Place
2008-09	SC 1880 Frankfurt	Rugby-Bundesliga	16	2	0	0	0	1st — Champions
2009-10	SC 1880 Frankfurt	Rugby-Bundesliga	14	0	0	0	0	1st — Runners-up
2010-11	SC 1880 Frankfurt	Rugby-Bundesliga	13	1	0	0	0	2nd — Runners-up
2011-12	SC 1880 Frankfurt	Rugby-Bundesliga	4	0	0	0	0	2nd — Semi-finals

- As of 30 April 2012

=== National team ===
==== European Nations Cup ====
Year	Team	Competition	Games	Points	Place
2006-2008	Germany	European Nations Cup Second Division	1	0	Champions
2008-2010	Germany	European Nations Cup First Division	4	0	6th — Relegated

==== Friendlies & other competitions ====
Year	Team	Competition	Games	Points
2007	Germany	Friendly	1	0
2008	Germany	Friendly	1	0
2009	Germany	Friendly	1	0

- As of 21 March 2010
