= Jens Schmidt =

Germany international rugby union player (born 1981)

- Born: Jens Schmidt; 18 February 1981 (age 45) Germany
- Height: 1.90 m (6 ft 3 in)
- Weight: 118 kg (18 st 8 lb)

Rugby union career
- Position: Lock
Senior career
Years	Team	Apps	(Points)
1990 – 2001	TSV H		
2001	Auch Gers		
2002–present	TSV H		
International career
Years	Team	Apps	(Points)
	Germany	41	
- Correct as of 8 April 2012

Jens Schmidt (born 18 February 1981) is a German international rugby union player, playing for the TSV Handschuhsheim in the Rugby-Bundesliga and the German national rugby union team. He was, until 2009, the captain of the German team, but then retired from international rugby, to return once more in 2010.

== Biography ==
Jens Schmidt begun playing rugby when he was nine years old in 1990.

Throughout his career, he played for the TSV Handschuhsheim, except when he spent one year with the French professional club FC Auch Gers in 2001.

He has won the German rugby union cup twice with his team, TSV Handschuhsheim, in 2005 and 2008. His greatest success as a national team player was the promotion to Division 1 of the European Nations Cup in 2008.

He made his 35th international for Germany in the game against Spain on 15 November 2008 and made his last appearance for his country against Portugal on 21 February 2009, his 38th cap. He returned briefly to the team for the all-important relegation decider against Spain on 20 March 2010 but remained an unused substitute.

Schmidt is a teacher by profession.

== Honours ==
=== Club ===
- German rugby union championship
  - Runners up: 2005
- German rugby union cup
  - Winner: 2005, 2008

=== National team ===
- European Nations Cup – Division 2
  - Champions: 2008

== Stats ==
Jens Schmidt's personal statistics in club and international rugby:

=== Club ===
Year	Club	Division	Games	Tries	Con	Pen	DG	Place
2008–09	TSV Handschuhsheim	Rugby-Bundesliga	16	1	0	0	0	6th
2009–10	TSV Handschuhsheim	Rugby-Bundesliga	17	4	0	0	0	4th – Semi-finals
2010–11	TSV Handschuhsheim	Rugby-Bundesliga	15	1	0	0	0	3rd – Semi-finals
2011–12	TSV Handschuhsheim	Rugby-Bundesliga	16	2	0	0	0	5th

- As of 30 April 2012

=== National team ===
==== European Nations Cup ====
Year	Team	Competition	Games	Points	Place
2006–2008	Germany	European Nations Cup Second Division	7	0	Champions
2008–2010	Germany	European Nations Cup First Division	4	0	6th – Relegated
2010–2012	Germany	European Nations Cup Division 1B	3	5	4th

==== Friendlies & other competitions ====
Year	Team	Competition	Games	Points
2007	Germany	Friendly	2	0
2008	Germany	Friendly	1	0

- As of 8 April 2012
