= Raphael Hackl =

German rugby union player

- Born: Raphael Hackl; 20 October 1987 (age 39)
- Height: 1.81 m (5 ft 11 in)
- Weight: 83 kg (13 st 1 lb)

Rugby union career
- Position: Fullback
Amateur team(s)
Years	Team	Apps	(Points)
- Berliner RC
- Correct as of 19 March 2010
International career
Years	Team	Apps	(Points)
2009 -	Germany	6	(0)
- Correct as of 21 March 2010

Raphael Hackl (born 20 October 1987) is a German international rugby union player, playing for the Berliner RC in the Rugby-Bundesliga and the German national rugby union team.

He made his debut for Germany in a friendly against Hong Kong on 12 December 2009.

== Stats ==
Raphael Hackl's personal statistics in club and international rugby:

=== Club ===
Year	Club	Division	Games	Tries	Con	Pen	DG	Place
2008-09	Berliner RC	Rugby-Bundesliga	17	2	15	6	0	4th — Semi-finals
2009-10	Berliner RC	Rugby-Bundesliga	17	3	10	6	0	6th
2010-11	Berliner RC	Rugby-Bundesliga	12	0	4	2	0	6th
2011-12	Berliner RC	Rugby-Bundesliga	10	4	10	5	0	9th

- As of 30 April 2012

=== National team ===
==== European Nations Cup ====
Year	Team	Competition	Games	Points	Place
2008-2010	Germany	European Nations Cup First Division	5	0	6th — Relegated

==== Friendlies & other competitions ====
Year	Team	Competition	Games	Points
2009	Germany	Friendly	1	0

- As of 15 December 2010
