= Juan Martin Goity =

- Born: Juan Martin Goity; 8 May 1983 (age 43) Puerto Madryn
- Height: 1.84 m (6 ft 0 in)
- Weight: 88 kg (13 st 12 lb)

Rugby union career
- Position: Centre
Amateur team(s)
Years	Team	Apps	(Points)
- Club San Martin
–	URBA		
- Correct as of 26 March 2010
Senior career
Years	Team	Apps	(Points)
- Newmarket
- Correct as of 26 March 2010
International career
Years	Team	Apps	(Points)
2008	Germany	1	(0)
- Correct as of 26 March 2010

Juan Martin Goity (born 8 May 1983 in Puerto Madryn) is a German international rugby union player of Argentinian descent, playing for the German national rugby union team.

Goity played one game for Germany, against a Welsh Districts XV on 28 November 2008. At the time, he was playing in England, for Newmarket RFC.

== Stats ==
Juan Martin Goity's personal statistics in club and international rugby:

=== National team ===
Year	Team	Competition	Games	Points	Place
2008	Germany	Friendly	1	0	N/A

- As of 26 March 2010
