= Stade Niortais =

French rugby union club, based in Niort

(France) Stade Niortais Rugby
- Founded: 1906; 120 years ago
- Location: 57 rue Sarrazine; 79000 Niort
- Ground: Stade Espinassou (Capacity: 1,500)
- President: (France) Gilbert Nasarre
- Coach: (France) Laurent Dossat - (France) Sébastien Morel
- League: Nationale
- 2024–25: Nationale 2, 2nd (promoted)
Team kit

Official website
- niortrugbyclub.com

Niort Rugby Club (French pronunciation: [njɔʁ ʁyɡbi klœb], formerly known as Stade Niortais Rugby) is a rugby team based in the city of Niort (population approx. 70,000) in the Deux-Sèvres département in the Nouvelle-Aquitaine region. They play their home games at "Stade Espinassou" which has a seating capacity of 1,500. Stade Niortais currently play in the Fédérale D1 division in France.

== Facilities ==
Stade Niortais has excellent facilities considering the size of the club. Their home ground comprises 3 pitches (2 training, 1 main pitch), over 12 dressing rooms all equipped with showers, a club house and bar used for functions and ceremonies alongside a running track, 2 tennis courts and handball court.

== Emblematic Players ==
- Yassine Ben Lahoucine
- Raphaël Lavaud
- Laurent Martine
- Denis Avril
- Robert Mohr
