= Christopher Liebig =

Germany international rugby union player

- Born: Christopher Liebig; January 18, 1987 (age 39)
- Height: 1.83 m (6 ft 0 in)
- Weight: 76 kg (12 st 0 lb)

Rugby union career
- Position: Wing
Senior career
Years	Team	Apps	(Points)
- HRK
–	Hamilton		
–	HRK		
International career
Years	Team	Apps	(Points)
2009 -	Germany	2	(0)
- Correct as of 24 March 2010

Christopher Liebig (born 18 January 1987) is a German international rugby union player, playing for the Heidelberger RK in the Rugby-Bundesliga and the German national rugby union team.

Liebig played in the 2009, 2010 and 2011 German championship final for Heidelberger RK, losing the first one and winning the following two.

He plays rugby since 1991. His brother, Steffen Liebig, is also a German international.

He made his debut for Germany against Portugal on 21 February 2009.

== Honours ==
=== Club ===
- German rugby union championship
  - Champions: 2010, 2011, 2012
  - Runners up: 2009
- German rugby union cup
  - Winners: 2011

== Stats ==
Christopher Liebig's personal statistics in club and international rugby:

=== Club ===
Year	Club	Division	Games	Tries	Con	Pen	DG	Place
2008-09	Heidelberger RK	Rugby-Bundesliga	15	8	0	0	0	2nd — Runners-up
2009-10	Heidelberger RK	Rugby-Bundesliga	11	5	0	0	0	3rd — Champions
2010-11	Heidelberger RK	Rugby-Bundesliga	8	4	0	0	0	1st — Champions
2011-12	Heidelberger RK	Rugby-Bundesliga	9	6	0	0	0	1st — Champions

- As of 11 May 2012

=== National team ===
Year	Team	Competition	Games	Points	Place
2008-2010	Germany	European Nations Cup First Division	2	0	6th — Relegated

- As of 15 December 2010
