= British Army Germany rugby union team =

British Army Germany
- Union: Army Rugby Union

Official website
- www.aru.org.uk/aru-bag.htm

The British Army Germany rugby union team is the rugby union team of the British Army in Germany. It is part of the Army Rugby Union.

The team regularly plays games against emerging nations like Belgium, Denmark, Netherlands, Germany and Luxembourg.

The British Forces Germany also have a very successful representative sevens squad.

== History ==
No records exist of rugby matches played by the British occupation forces in Germany after the First World War, despite a ten-year presence of the British Army of the Rhine until 1929.

After the Second World War, a representative side was formed, whose fixtures have helped an interest in the playing of rugby in those countries.

== 2009-10 fixtures ==
The fixtures and results of the team for 2009-10:

BA (G) rugby union team fixtures
Date	Location	Opposition	Result	Report
26 August - 4 September 2009	Padova	Italian Rugby Tour		(Report)
26 September 2009	JHQ	Luxembourg	64-5	(Report)
24 October 2009	JHQ	Army Scotland		
16 December 2009	Aldershot	Army 'A'	9-39	(Report)
16 January 2010	Gütersloh	Germany	cancelled	
30 January 2010	Rheda-Wiedenbrück	Germany	cancelled	
20 February 2010	Hanover	Heildelberg		
20 March 2010	Amsterdam	Netherlands		
3 April 2010	JHQ	Belgium		

- The game against Germany had to be postponed twice because of bad weather and was eventually cancelled.
