= Tama Tuirirangi =

- Full name: Kuramate Tama Tuirirangi
- Born: 15 September 1978 (age 48) Invercargill, New Zealand
- Height: 181 cm (5 ft 11 in)
- Weight: 111 kg (245 lb)

Rugby union career
- Position: Prop
Provincial / State sides
Years	Team	Apps	(Points)
1998–04	Taranaki	44	(10)
2006	Wellington	3	(0)
2006	Manawatu	2	(0)
2012–13	Otago	15	(0)
2015	Mid Canterbury	10	(5)
Super Rugby
Years	Team	Apps	(Points)
1999–00	Hurricanes	11	(0)
2001	Chiefs	6	(0)
2003	Hurricanes	9	(0)
2007	Reds	7	(0)

Kuramate Tama Tuirirangi (born 15 September 1978) is a New Zealand former professional rugby union player.

== Rugby career ==
Born in Invercargill, Tuirirangi was capped for the 1999 NZ under-21s team.

Tuirirangi was a Hurricanes prop in 1999 and 2000, then got picked up by the Chiefs as injury cover. He was sent off against the Sharks in round eight of the 2001 Super 12 season for striking and didn't feature again for the Chiefs.

Following a long period on the sidelines with a slipped disc injury, Tuirirangi had another year at the Hurricanes in 2003 and a season in Italy with Brescia-based club Leonessa.

Tuirirangi played for the Queensland Reds in the 2007 Super 14 season, signed from the Gold Coast Breakers.
