= Berliner RC =

German rugby union club, based in Berlin

(Germany) Berliner RC
- Full name: Berliner Rugby Club e.V. 1926
- Union: German Rugby Federation
- Founded: 1926; 100 years ago
- Location: Berlin, Germany
- Ground: Sportanlage Jungfernheide
- Chairman: Mark Temme
- Coach: Uwe Maaser
- League: Rugby-Bundesliga
- 2015–16: Rugby-Bundesliga North/East, 4th
1st kit	2nd kit

Official website
- www.berliner-rugby-club.de

The Berliner Rugby Club is a German rugby union club from Berlin, currently playing in the Rugby-Bundesliga.

== History ==
The club was formed in 1926.

While very successful in its youth department, it has not managed similar achievements on the senior level.

The club has yet to win a national championship, having appeared in the 1989 German rugby union championship final, where it lost 6-20 to TSV Victoria Linden. Two lost Cup finals also stand to its name.

In the 2007-08 Rugby-Bundesliga season, the club finished in fourth place, its best result in the league since adoption of the single-division format in 2001. The 2008-09 season started not as successful with the team sitting in seventh place, just above the relegation zone but good results in the second half of the season saw it finish in fourth place and qualify for the finals. In the semi-finals, SC 1880 Frankfurt proved to strong, defeating BRC 36-15.

With the first team struggling in the Bundesliga because of a number of injuries, the club was forced to withdraw its reserve team from the second division in October 2011, with the players from the side being moved to the first and third team instead.

A league reform in 2012 allowed the club to stay in the league after initially having been relegated as the Bundesliga was expanded from ten to 24 teams. BRC finished first in their group in the 2012-13 season and qualified for the north/east division of the championship round, where it came second. The club was knocked out in the quarter-finals of the play-offs after a 7–49 loss to TV Pforzheim.

The club finished second in the north-east championship round in 2013–14, beat RG Heidelberg 31-24 first round of the play-offs and was knocked out by Heidelberger RK in the semi-finals. In the 2014–15 season the club finished fourth in the north-east championship group but was knocked out of the first round of the play-offs after a 49–0 oss to RK Heusenstamm.

== Club honours ==
- German rugby union championship
  - Runners up: 1989
- German rugby union cup
  - Runners up: 1983, 1989
- German sevens championship
  - Runners up: 2006

== Recent seasons ==
Recent seasons of the club:

=== First team ===
Year	Division	Position
1997-98	2nd Rugby-Bundesliga North/East (II)	1st — Promoted
1998-99	Rugby-Bundesliga North/East (I)	5th
1998-99	Bundesliga qualification round	7th
1999-2000	Rugby-Bundesliga North/East	5th
1999-2000	Bundesliga qualification round	9th — Relegated
2000-01	2nd Rugby-Bundesliga North/East (II)	1st
2000-01	Bundesliga qualification round	7th - Promoted
2001-02	Rugby-Bundesliga (I)	7th
2002-03	Rugby-Bundesliga	7th
2003-04	Rugby-Bundesliga	5th
2004-05	Rugby-Bundesliga	5th
2005-06	Rugby-Bundesliga	7th
2006-07	Rugby-Bundesliga	5th
2007-08	Rugby-Bundesliga	4th
2008-09	Rugby-Bundesliga	4th — Semi-finals
2009–10	Rugby-Bundesliga	6th
2010–11	Rugby-Bundesliga	6th
2011–12	Rugby-Bundesliga	9th
2012–13	Rugby-Bundesliga qualification round – East	1st
2012–13	Rugby-Bundesliga championship round – North-East	2nd — Quarter finals
2013–14	Rugby-Bundesliga qualification round – East	1st
2013–14	Rugby-Bundesliga championship round – North-East	2nd — Semi finals
2014–15	Rugby-Bundesliga qualification round – East	2nd
2014–15	Rugby-Bundesliga championship round – North-East	4th – First round
2015–16	Rugby-Bundesliga North-East	4th

- Until 2001, when the single-division Bundesliga was established, the season was divided in autumn and spring, a Vorrunde and Endrunde, whereby the top teams of the Rugby-Bundesliga would play out the championship while the bottom teams together with the autumn 2nd Bundesliga champion would play for Bundesliga qualification. The remainder of the 2nd Bundesliga teams would play a spring round to determine the relegated clubs. Where two placing's are shown, the first is autumn, the second spring. In 2012 the Bundesliga was expanded from ten to 24 teams and the 2nd Bundesliga from 20 to 24 with the leagues divided into four regional divisions.

=== Reserve team ===
Year	Division	Position
2003-04	Rugby-Regionalliga East (North) (III)	6th
2003-04	Placings round 1	1st
2004-05	Rugby-Regionalliga East A	1st
2004-05	North/East championship round	4th
2005-06	Rugby-Regionalliga East A	2nd
2005-06	North/East championship round	6th
2006-07	Rugby-Regionalliga East A	2nd
2006-07	North/East championship round	2nd
2007-08	Rugby-Regionalliga East A	1st
2008-09	Rugby-Regionalliga East A	2nd — Promoted
2009–10	2nd Rugby-Bundesliga North/East (II)	8th
2010–11	2nd Rugby-Bundesliga North/East	8th
2011–12	2nd Rugby-Bundesliga North/East	10th — Withdrawn
2012–13	Rugby-Regionalliga East (III)	2nd — Promoted
2013–14	Rugby-Regionalliga East	2nd
2014–15	2nd Rugby-Bundesliga qualification round – East	1st
2014–15	DRV-Pokal – North-East	7th
2015–16	2nd Rugby-Bundesliga East	3rd

== Rugby internationals ==
In Germany's 2006–08 European Nations Cup campaign, Colin Grzanna, Krystian Trochowski, Gerrit van Look and Franck Moutsinga were called up for the national team.

In the 2008–10 campaign, Grzanna and van Look and appeared for the BRC and Germany again, while Raphael Hackl was a new addition to the club's list of internationals.

In the 2010–12 campaign, no player from the club was selected to play for Germany.

The club had one player selected for the German under-18 team at the 2009 European Under-18 Rugby Union Championship, Samy Füchsel. Füchsel also played at the 2010 tournament.
