= Domenick Davies =

- Born: Domenick Davies; 1 February 1978 (age 48)
- Height: 1.86 m (6 ft 1 in)
- Weight: 92 kg (14 st 7 lb)

Rugby union career
- Position: Fullback
Amateur team(s)
Years	Team	Apps	(Points)
? - 2004	DRC Hannover		
2004 - ?	DSV 78 Hannover		
- Correct as of 23 March 2010
Senior career
Years	Team	Apps	(Points)
- Pontypridd RFC
–	Bournemouth RFC		
International career
Years	Team	Apps	(Points)
- Germany
- Correct as of 23 March 2010

Domenick Davies (born 1 February 1978) is a German international rugby union player of Welsh descent, playing for the Bournemouth RFC in the National League 3 South and the German national rugby union team. His brother, Kieron Davies, is also a German international.

He has been playing rugby since 1985.

He was part of the German team against Luxembourg on 27 November 2004, scoring a try in a 96-0 victory, Germany's highest win ever at the time.

He sustained a cartilage injury in January 2010, ruling him out for the rest of the season and Germany's decisive ENC matches.

On 1 February 2023, Domenick became the Lord of Hougun Manor estate, Cumbria.

== Stats ==
Domenick Davies's personal statistics in club and international rugby:

=== National team ===
==== European Nations Cup ====
Year	Team	Competition	Games	Points	Place
2000-2010	[Germany]	European Nations Cup First Division / European Nations Cup Second Division / World Cup Qualifiers (2003 & 2007)	16	10	N/A

- European Nations Cup Squad Member: 2000-2006 & 2008-2010.

- World Cup qualifier squad member: 2003 & 2007.

- 16 caps for the national team with test caps won against:

Denmark; Ukraine; Sweden; Russia; Holland; Latvia; Hong Kong; Poland; Moldova; Croatia; Luxembourg

- Friendly games played against:

British Army, Germany; Welsh Districts XV; Barbarians; Gennevilliers (France Tour 2004)

- Other honours include:

-Dorset & Wiltshire U16-U21

-South West of England U19

-South England U19

-Welsh Exiles U19-U21

-Welsh U19 Squad Member

-Northern Germany Senior XV (Niedersachsen)

==== Friendlies & other competitions ====
Year	Team	Competition	Games	Points
2000-2010	Germany	Friendly	8	5

- As of 23 March 2010
