= Shalva Didebashvili =

German rugby union player

- Born: Shalva Didebashvili; March 1, 1982 (age 44) Georgia, Soviet Union

Rugby union career
- Position: Flanker
Amateur team(s)
| Years | Team | Apps | (Points) |
- SC Neuenheim
- Correct as of 23 March 2010
International career
| Years | Team | Apps | (Points) |
| 2010 | Germany | 1 | (0) |
- Correct as of 23 March 2010

Shalva Didebashvili (born 1 March 1982) is a German international rugby union player, playing for the SC Neuenheim in the Rugby-Bundesliga and the German national rugby union team.

He made his debut for Germany against Georgia on 6 February 2010. Incidentally, Didebashvili was born in Georgia.

With 15 tries, he was his club's best try scorer in the 2010–11 season.

== Stats ==
Shalva Didebashvili's personal statistics in club and international rugby:

=== Club ===
| Year | Club | Division | Games | Tries | Con | Pen | DG | Place |
|---|---|---|---|---|---|---|---|---|
| 2008-09 | SC Neuenheim | Rugby-Bundesliga | 16 | 6 | 0 | 0 | 0 | 3rd — Semi-finals |
| 2009-10 | SC Neuenheim | Rugby-Bundesliga | 17 | 9 | 0 | 0 | 0 | 5th |
| 2010-11 | SC Neuenheim | Rugby-Bundesliga | 13 | 15 | 0 | 0 | 0 | 5th |
| 2011-12 | SC Neuenheim | Rugby-Bundesliga | 15 | 7 | 0 | 0 | 0 | 4th — Semi-finals |

- As of 30 April 2012

=== National team ===
| Year | Team | Competition | Games | Points | Place |
|---|---|---|---|---|---|
| 2008-10 | Germany | European Nations Cup | 1 | 0 | 6th — Relegated |

- As of 23 March 2010
