= Udo Schwarz =

German rugby union player

- Born: Udo Schwarz; July 7, 1986 (age 40)
- Height: 1.73 m (5 ft 8 in)
- Weight: 92 kg (14 st 7 lb)
- Occupation: Teacher

Rugby union career
- Position: Wing
Senior career
Years	Team	Apps	(Points)
–	TVP		
–	HTV		
–	SCN		
2011 - present	TVP	5	(5)
- Correct as of 30 April 2012
International career
Years	Team	Apps	(Points)
2008	Germany	1	(0)
- Correct as of 26 March 2010

Udo Schwarz (born 7 July 1986) is a German international rugby union player, playing for the SC Neuenheim in the Rugby-Bundesliga and the German national rugby union team.

Schwarz played one game for Germany, against a Welsh Districts XV on 28 November 2008.

== Honours ==
=== Club ===
- German rugby union championship
  - Runners up: 2012

== Stats ==
Udo Schwarz's personal statistics in club and international rugby:

=== National team ===
Year	Team	Competition	Games	Points
2008	Germany	Friendly	1	0

- As of 26 March 2010

=== Club ===
Year	Club	Division	Games	Tries	Con	Pen	DG	Place
2008-09	SC Neuenheim	Rugby-Bundesliga	16	3	0	0	0	3rd — Semi-finals
2009-10	SC Neuenheim	Rugby-Bundesliga	9	2	0	0	0	5th
2010-11	SC Neuenheim	Rugby-Bundesliga	13	6	0	0	0	5th
2011-12	TV Pforzheim	Rugby-Bundesliga	5	1	0	0	0	3rd — Runners up

- As of 25 August 2011
