= Robert Mohr (rugby union) =

Germany international rugby union player

- Born: Robert Mohr; 25 August 1978 (age 48) Hannover, West Germany
- Height: 1.92 m (6 ft 4 in)
- Weight: 111 kg (17 st 7 lb)

Rugby union career
- Position: Number eight
Senior career
Years	Team	Apps	(Points)
1999 – 2002	Bourgoin	58	(0)
2002 – 2012	La Rochelle	292	(25)
2012 – 2013	Niort	16	(0)
- Correct as of 24 June 2012
International career
Years	Team	Apps	(Points)
2008 – 2015	Germany	33	(1)
National sevens team
Years	Team		Comps
2009 – 2010	Germany 7s		1

Robert Mohr (born 25 August 1978) is a retired German international rugby union player, having played professionally in France for Bourgoin, La Rochelle, Niort and for the German national rugby union team. He is one of the few players in the history of the German team who was a professional.

== Biography ==
Mohr was born in Hannover on 25 August 1978.

He played for Bourgoin in the Heineken Cup in 1999–2000.

Mohr scored a try in Germany's home game against Spain in the qualifying for the 2007 Rugby World Cup, which the team won.

The German rugby federation repeatedly tried to have Mohr released for the team but his club refused despite being obliged to.

Mohr and his club, La Rochelle, finished in the top five of the French second division in each season from 2007 through 2010. After failing to earn promotion in the first three seasons, losing in the promotion semi-finals in 2008 and 2009 and in the final in 2007, the club finally broke through with a win over Lyon in the 2010 promotion final. After ten years with La Rochelle he announced his departure from the club in 2012. Being thought after by German club DSV 78 Hannover he decided to stay in France and join third division side Stade Niortais instead. He played his last competitive rugby match on 6 April 2013, when he fielded for Germany against Sweden in a 73–17 victory. Mohr retired after this match from international and club rugby and will work for a drink vending machine manufacturer and also act as a talent scout for La Rochelle. He however returned to the German team one more time in May 2014 in the decisive world cup qualifier against Russia which Germany lost.

He was part of Germany's 7's side at the 2009 Hannover Sevens.

== Honours ==
=== Club ===
- Rugby Pro D2
  - Runners-up: 2007
  - Promotion final winner: 2010

== Stats ==
Robert Mohr's personal statistics in club and international rugby:

=== Club ===
Year	Club	Division	Games	Points	Place
2001–02	CS Bourgoin-Jallieu	Top 16	3	0	
2005–06	La Rochelle	Rugby Pro D2	29	0	8th
2006–07	La Rochelle	Rugby Pro D2	30	10	3rd
2007–08	La Rochelle	Rugby Pro D2	29	5	5th
2008–09	La Rochelle	Rugby Pro D2	28	10	4th
2009–10	La Rochelle	Rugby Pro D2	30	0	3rd – Promoted
2010–11	La Rochelle	Top 14	16	0	13th – Relegated
2011–12	La Rochelle	Rugby Pro D2	28	0	5th
2012–13	Stade Niortais	Federale 1	16	0	

- As of 30 April 2012

=== National team ===
Year	Team	Competition	Games	Points	Place
2008–2010	Germany	European Nations Cup First Division	4	0	6th – Relegated
2010–2012	Germany	European Nations Cup Division 1B	2	0	4th
2012–2014	Germany	European Nations Cup Division 1B	4	5	ongoing

- As of 4 December 2013
