= RK 03 Berlin =

German rugby union club, based in Berlin

(Germany) RK 03 Berlin
- Full name: Rugby Klub 03 Berlin
- Union: German Rugby Federation
- Founded: 1967; 59 years ago (BSG Post Rugby); 2003; 23 years ago (RK 03)
- Location: Berlin, Germany
- Ground: Stadion Buschallee
- Chairman: Marc Berger
- Coach: Falk Duwe
- Captain: Lucas Hinds-Johnson
- League: Rugby-Bundesliga
- 2015–16: Rugby-Bundesliga North/East, 1st
Team kit

Official website
- rugbyklub03.berlin//

The RK 03 Berlin is a German rugby union club from Berlin, currently playing in the Rugby-Bundesliga.

The club was formed in 2003, when the rugby department of the Post SV Berlin left the club. Post SV Rugby itself had been formed in 1967 as BSG Post Berlin Rugby.

== History ==
=== Post SV Rugby ===
Logo of Post SV Berlin rugby department

PSV's rugby department had been formed in 1967 in what was then East Germany, under the name of BSG Post Berlin Rugby.

Post Rugby took part in the East German championship, the DDR Rugby-Oberliga. It celebrated its greatest success in this league in the last decade of its existence, finishing third from 1985 to 1988, followed by two runners-up finishes in 1989 and 1990. Throughout its history, the club also provided a number of East German rugby internationals.

In 2003, the clubs rugby department left Post SV to form its own club, the RK 03 Berlin.

=== RK 03 ===
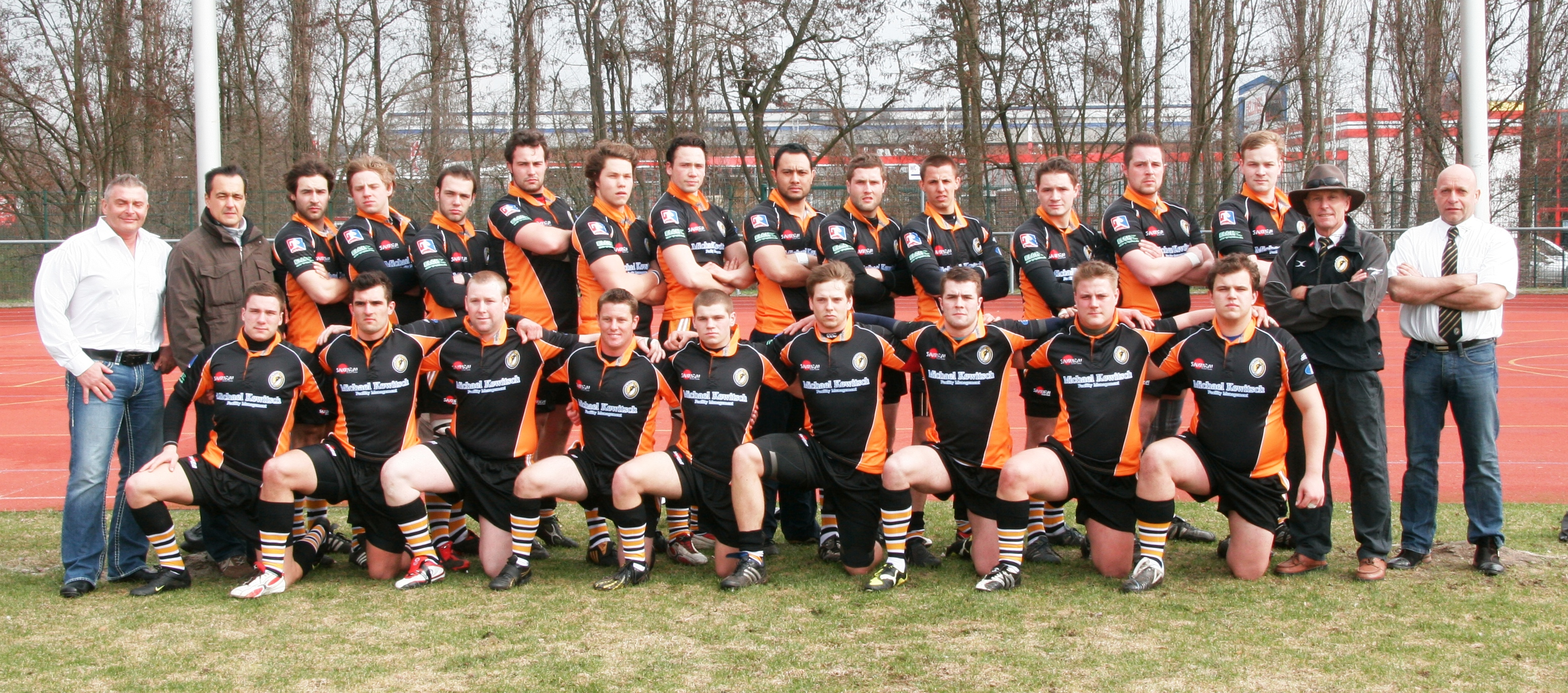
Squad of RK 03 Berlin in March 2010

PSV had last been playing in the 2nd Rugby-Bundesliga North/East in 2002-03 and RK took its place there, winning the league in its first attempt. After a 28-23 victory over South/West champion BSC Offenbach, the team earned promotion to the Bundesliga.

A seventh place in the first division in 2004-05 proved not enough and RK was relegated immediately, having won only one out of its fourteen games and losing the relegation match to DSV 78/08 Ricklingen 12-14. The season after, in the 2nd Bundesliga, the club won the league once more but lost the championship final to SC 1880 Frankfurt. In the following promotion match with now Bundesliga side DSV 78/08 another loss meant another year in the second tier.

In 2006-07, RK only came second in the 2nd Bundesliga but the season after, 2007-08, it won its division once more and a 22-6 win over ASV Köln Rugby earned it a second Bundesliga promotion.

In 2008-09, the club was struggling against relegation, finishing in eight place, its rival for league survival being bottom of the table side DRC Hannover. DRC accepted direct relegation at the end of the season, making the relegation final unnecessary, meaning, RK 03 will be playing in the Bundesliga for another season.

On 19 January 2009, the club received the long-awaited approval from the city of Berlin to upgrade its facilities, allowing, among other things, the instalment of flood lights.

The 2011-12 season saw the club finish above local rival BRC for the first time, in 8th place and thereby condemning the other Berlin club to a relegation spot. RK 03 finished second in their group in the 2012-13 season and qualified for the north/east division of the championship round, where it came third. The club was knocked out in the quarter-finals of the play-offs after a 10–36 loss to SC Neuenheim.

In 2013–14 the team qualified for the championship and the play-offs once more, defeating RK Heusenstamm 33–19 in the first round and losing to Heidelberger RK in the quarter-finals. In the 2014–15 season the club finished second in the north-east championship group and was knocked out by RG Heidelberg in the quarter-finals of the play-offs. In the 2015–16 season RK won the north/east division of the Bundesliga but lost to TV Pforzheim in the semi-finals of the play-offs.

== Club honours ==
=== Men ===
- 2nd Rugby-Bundesliga
  - Champions: 2004, 2008
  - Division champions: 2002, 2004, 2006, 2008
- East German rugby union championship
  - Runners up: 1989, 1990
- East German rugby union cup
  - Runners up: 1980, 1982, 1987, 1988

== Recent seasons ==
Recent seasons of the club:

=== Men ===
==== Post SV ====
| Year | Division | Position |
|---|---|---|
| 1998-99 | | |
| 1998-99 | 2nd Bundesliga North/East qualification round | 2nd — Promoted |
| 1999–2000 | 2nd Rugby-Bundesliga North/East (II) | 4th |
| 1999–2000 | 2nd Bundesliga North/East qualification round | 1st |
| 2000-01 | 2nd Rugby-Bundesliga North/East | 2nd |
| 2000-01 | Bundesliga qualification round | 3rd |
| 2001-02 | 2nd Rugby-Bundesliga North/East | 1st |
| 2002-03 | 2nd Rugby-Bundesliga North/East | 2nd |

==== RK 03 ====
| Year | Division | Position |
|---|---|---|
| 2003-04 | 2nd Rugby-Bundesliga North/East (II) | 1st — Promoted |
| 2004-05 | Rugby-Bundesliga (I) | 7th — Relegated |
| 2005-06 | 2nd Rugby-Bundesliga North/East (II) | 1st |
| 2006-07 | 2nd Rugby-Bundesliga North/East | 2nd |
| 2007-08 | 2nd Rugby-Bundesliga North/East | 1st — Promoted |
| 2008-09 | Rugby-Bundesliga (I) | 8th |
| 2009–10 | Rugby-Bundesliga | 7th |
| 2010–11 | Rugby-Bundesliga | 8th |
| 2011–12 | Rugby-Bundesliga | 8th |
| 2012–13 | Rugby-Bundesliga qualification round – East | 2nd |
| 2012–13 | Rugby-Bundesliga championship round – North-East | 3rd — Quarter finals |
| 2013–14 | Rugby-Bundesliga qualification round – East | 2nd |
| 2013–14 | Rugby-Bundesliga championship round – North-East | 3rd — Quarter-finals |
| 2014–15 | Rugby-Bundesliga qualification round – East | 1st |
| 2014–15 | Rugby-Bundesliga championship round – North-East | 2nd — Quarter finals |
| 2015–16 | Rugby-Bundesliga North-East | 1st — Semi finals |

- Until 2001, when the single-division Bundesliga was established, the season was divided in autumn and spring, a Vorrunde and Endrunde, whereby the top teams of the Rugby-Bundesliga would play out the championship while the bottom teams together with the autumn 2nd Bundesliga champion would play for Bundesliga qualification. The remainder of the 2nd Bundesliga teams would play a spring round to determine the relegated clubs. Where two placing's are shown, the first is autumn, the second spring. In 2012 the Bundesliga was expanded from ten to 24 teams and the 2nd Bundesliga from 20 to 24 with the leagues divided into four regional divisions.

=== Women ===
| Year | Division | Position |
|---|---|---|
| 2004-05 | | |
| 2005-06 | Regionalliga East (III) | 1st |
| 2006–07 | Regionalliga East | 1st |
| 2007–08 | Regionalliga East | 1st |
| 2008–09 | Regionalliga East | 1st |
| 2009–10 | Regionalliga East | 1st |
| 2008–09 | Women's 2nd Rugby Bundesliga (II) | 4th |
| 2009–10 | Women's 2nd Rugby Bundesliga | 7th |

== Rugby internationals ==
In Germany's 2006–08 European Nations Cup campaign, no player from the club was called up for the national team, while, in the 2008–10 campaign, Lukas Rosenthal, Benjamin Ulrich and Lukas Hinds-Johnson were new additions to the German team, selected from the RK 03 squad.

In the 2010–012 European Nations Cup campaign, Lukas Hinds-Johnson was again called up for Germany.

The club, under the name of BSG Post, also produced the following East German internationals:

- Harald Lorenz
- Burt Weiß
- Christian Demuth
- Willi Ebel
- Wolfgang Michaelis
- Peter Wieczorek
- Frank Bittermann
- Frank Drenkow
- Thomas Boeck
- Andreas Rakoczy
- Roland Stutz
- Oliver Woeller
- Gert Lieck
- Jörg Pachmann
- Thomas Führer

== Coaches ==
Recent coaches of the club:

| Name | Period |
|---|---|
| Christian Lill | 2009 |
| (Australia) Allan Nugent | 2009–2010 |
| (New Zealand) Lofty Stevenson | 2010-11 |
| (Australia) Allan Nugent | 2011–12 |
| Christian Lill | 2012-2017 |
| (Argentina) Maxi Bonanno | 2017-2022 |
| (Spain) Alvaro Ruiz del Real | 2022-2023 |
| Falk Duwe | 2023- |
