= TSV Handschuhsheim =

German rugby union club, based in Heidelberg

(Germany) TSV Handschuhsheim
- Full name: Turn- und Sportverein Handschuhsheim 1886 e. V.
- Union: German Rugby Federation
- Founded: 1886; 140 years ago
- Location: Heidelberg, Germany
- Ground: Am Neckarfeld
- Chairman: Volker Kraft
- Coach: Gordon Hanlon
- Captain: Sven Wetzel
- League: Rugby-Bundesliga
- 2016–17: Rugby-Bundesliga South/West, 4th
Team kit

Official website
- www.tsv-rugby.de

The TSV Handschuhsheim is a German rugby union club from Heidelberg, currently playing in the Rugby-Bundesliga. Apart from rugby, the club also offers other sports like association football, handball and tennis.

== History ==
The club was formed in 1886 in Handschuhsheim, a suburb of Heidelberg, one of the centres of German rugby.

For most of its existence, it has stood in the shadow of the other, more successful rugby clubs in town, the SC Neuenheim, Heidelberger RK and RG Heidelberg.

TSV had a breakthrough in 1953, when it reached the German championship final for the first time. It played in three more finals in the next four years, winning its sole championship in 1957. Three more final appearances followed in the 1960s.

With the establishment of the Rugby-Bundesliga in 1971, success dropped off for the team and after one more finals appearance in 1978 a long drought followed.

After a 27-year title-wait, TSV took out the German Cup in 2005 but lost the championship final that year. Both games were against DRC Hannover.

In 2008 it won the cup once more, beating German champions RG Heidelberg, 24–23, after extra time in front of 1,000 spectators.

In 2008–09, the club sat in fourth place at the winter break with good chances of making it into the expanded finals, where the top-four now qualified but narrowly missed those with a sixth-place finish. Its reserve team played in the 2nd Bundesliga South/West this season. The club also reached the German Cup final once more, losing to champions SC 1880 Frankfurt.

The 2010–11 season saw the club finish third, behind the two professional outfits Heidelberger RK and SC 1880 Frankfurt, prompting it to be referred to as German amateur champions. It also saw the retirement of its most reliable try-scorer Alexander Pipa at the end of the season. TSV finished fifth in their group in the 2012–13 season and failed to qualify for the championship round, instead entering the second tier DRV-Pokal, where it came first in the south/west division. The club took out the German Cup with a 42–10 victory over Heidelberger TV. The club's reserve team took out the championship in the 3rd Liga South/West.

In 2013–14 the team qualified for the championship and the play-offs in the Rugby-Bundesliga, defeating SC Germania List, 31–22, in the first round and being knocked out by TV Pforzheim in the quarter-finals. In the 2014–15 season the club finished fifth in the south-west championship group and was knocked out by Heidelberger RK in the quarter-finals of the play-offs after a first-round victory over SC Germania List.

The club's rugby department had a membership of 360 in 2007.

== Club honours ==
- German rugby union championship
  - Champions: 1957
  - Runners up: 1953, 1955, 1956, 1960, 1963, 1968, 1978, 2005
- German rugby union cup
  - Winner: 2005, 2008, 2013
  - Runners up: 1978, 2009, 2016
- German sevens championship
  - Champions: 2004

== Recent seasons ==
=== Men: First team ===
Recent seasons of the club:

Year	Division	Position
1997-98	Rugby-Bundesliga (I)	6th
1998-99	Rugby-Bundesliga South/West	
1998-99	Bundesliga qualification round	1st
1999-2000	Rugby-Bundesliga South/West	1st
1999-2000	Bundesliga championship round	6th
2000-01	Rugby-Bundesliga South/West	1st
2000-01	Bundesliga championship round	4th
2001-02	Rugby-Bundesliga	4th
2002-03	Rugby-Bundesliga	5th
2003-04	Rugby-Bundesliga	4th
2004-05	Rugby-Bundesliga	2nd — Runners up
2005-06	Rugby-Bundesliga	4th
2006-07	Rugby-Bundesliga	6th
2007-08	Rugby-Bundesliga	3rd
2008-09	Rugby-Bundesliga	6th
2009–10	Rugby-Bundesliga	4th — Semi-finals
2010–11	Rugby-Bundesliga	3rd — Semi-finals
2011–12	Rugby-Bundesliga	5th
2012–13	Rugby-Bundesliga qualification round – South	5th
2012–13	DRV-Pokal – South-West	1st — Winners
2013–14	Rugby-Bundesliga qualification round – South	3rd
2013–14	Rugby-Bundesliga championship round – South-West	6th — Quarter–finals
2014–15	Rugby-Bundesliga qualification round – South	5th
2014–15	Rugby-Bundesliga championship round – South-West	5th — Quarter finals
2015–16	Rugby-Bundesliga South-West	5th

- Until 2001, when the single-division Bundesliga was established, the season was divided in autumn and spring, a Vorrunde and Endrunde, whereby the top teams of the Rugby-Bundesliga would play out the championship while the bottom teams together with the autumn 2nd Bundesliga champion would play for Bundesliga qualification. The remainder of the 2nd Bundesliga teams would play a spring round to determine the relegated clubs. Where two placing's are shown, the first is autumn, the second spring. In 2012 the Bundesliga was expanded from ten to 24 teams and the 2nd Bundesliga from 20 to 24 with the leagues divided into four regional divisions.

=== Reserve team ===
Year	Division	Position
2001-02	Rugby-Regionalliga (III)	1st
2002-03	Rugby-Regionalliga	3rd
2003-04	Rugby-Regionalliga	2nd
2004-05	Rugby-Regionalliga	Promoted
2005-06	2nd Rugby-Bundesliga South/West(II)	5th
2006-07	2nd Rugby-Bundesliga South/West	5th
2007–08	2nd Rugby-Bundesliga South/West	3rd
2008–09	2nd Rugby-Bundesliga South/West	5th
2009–10	2nd Rugby-Bundesliga South/West	7th
2010–11	2nd Rugby-Bundesliga South/West	4th
2011–12	2nd Rugby-Bundesliga South/West	8th — Relegated
2012–13	3rd Liga South/West - West (III)	1st — Champions
2013–14	2nd Rugby-Bundesliga qualification round – West	1st
2013–14	DRV-Pokal – South-West	5th — First round
2014–15	2nd Rugby-Bundesliga qualification round – South	5th
2014–15	Liga-Pokal – South-West	2nd — Winners
2015–16	2nd Rugby-Bundesliga South	4th

== Rugby internationals ==
In Germany's 2006–08 European Nations Cup campaign, Thorsten Wiedemann, Sebastien Chaule, Jens Schmidt, Alexander Pipa and Alexander Hug were called up for the national team.

In the 2008–10 campaign, Wiedemann, Chaule, Hug, Pipa and Schmidt all appeared for the TSV and Germany again, while Alexander Metz was a new addition to the club's list of internationals.

In the 2010–12 campaign, Sven Wetzel, Rob May and Felix Bayer were new additions to the club's list of German internationals, while Jens Schmidt and Alexander Hug were re-selected for the side.

The club had three players selected for the German under-18 team at the 2009 European Under-18 Rugby Union Championship, these being Matthias Marin, Sebastian Kößler and Konstantin Hoffmann. Of these, Sebastian Kößler also played at the 2010 tournament.

== Coaches ==
Recent coaches of the club:

Name	Period
Mathias Bechtel & Günther Sträßer	2009
Jan Ceselka	2009 - 2012
Alexander Pipa (head coach), Frank Genthner (forwards), Nico Strohmeier (backs)	2013-2016
Peter Ianusevici (Head Coach)	2016-2017
Gordon Hanlon (Director of Rugby, Christoph Heising (Backs), Alex Hug (Lineouts and Defense), Julius Nostadt (Scrum and Contact), Mathias Pipa (kicking and counterattack), Peter Ianusevici (Performance Analyst)	2017–Present
