= Wild Rugby Academy =

- Founded: October 2007
- Location: Heidelberg, Germany
- Fields: Rugby union
- Key people: (Germany) Hans Peter Wild Founder
- Website: http://www.wildrugbyacademy.de/siteEn/

The Wild Rugby Academy is a German rugby union institution in Heidelberg, focused on the development of the sport in the region and Germany. One of its main aims is to develop players for Germany to be able to participate in the 2015 Rugby World Cup, as well as to establish a German team in the European Challenge Cup, the Wild Titans by 2010. The later plan was delayed but a German team is now scheduled to enter the competition from 2011, alongside other academy teams from Russia, Spain and Georgia.

== History ==
The academy was named after its founder, the German entrepreneur Hans Peter Wild. He originally conceived the idea in May 2007 and the academy was established in October of the same year.

The academy aims to import expertise from the more developed rugby nations in order to improve the game in Germany. It started out with an under-19 group which was later followed by an under-21 group, and draws young players from the Frankfurt, Heusenstamm and Heidelberg area, targeting clubs and schools. In 2008, the academy "decided to become more professional" and employed a new manager and coach.

In November 2008, the academy embarked on its first tour, traveling to England to play two matches. In March 2009, an academy team, the Wild Titans, will be traveling to Hong Kong for a tournament. Mustafa Güngör and Benjamin Danso, two current German internationals, are part of the 15 selected players for the tournament.

== Aims and achievements ==
The academy aims to develop the game of rugby union in Germany, by awarding scholarships to young and senior players. It also plans to assist in the development of coaches and referees. The main goals of the academy are:

- to establish a German team in the European Challenge Cup, the Wild Titans. It hopes to achieve this by 2010. This is now scheduled to happen in 2011.
- to develop players for Germany to be able to participate in the 2015 Rugby World Cup. The academy has the support of the German Rugby Federation, which hopes to establish a similar institution in the north of Germany.

Christopher Liebig was the first player trained with the academy to make a debut for Germany, in its game against Portugal in February 2009.

In 2018, the academy's scope was significantly curtailed, as Dr. Wild shifted his focus away from German rugby in the wake of the "Rugbystreit" (The "Rugbystreit" in German Rugby.)

== Staff ==
The W.R.A. employees a number of staff for coaching purposes:

- (South Africa) Frederik Jakobus Potgieter, Head of Operations
- (Germany) Alexander Wiedemann, Team & Project Manager
