= German Rugby Union Cup =

- Sport: Rugby union
- Founded: 1962
- Country: Germany
- Most recent champion: SC Neuenheim

The German Rugby Union Cup (German: DRV-Pokal) is the premier cup competition for men in the sport of rugby union in Germany.

In October 2009, it was proposed to discontinue both men's cup competitions after 2010, meaning, both the DRV-Pokal and the league cup were not to be played anymore after this season. However, this proposal was initially not carried out but neither competition was held in 2011–12. The DRV-Pokal however returned in 2012–13, now contested by the Bundesliga teams not qualified for the second round of the season and the best 2nd Bundesliga teams.

== History ==
The DRV-Pokal was established in 1962 under the guidance of the chairman of the DRV, Heinz Reinhold. Originally, the trophy for the winner was a picture of the Brandenburg Gate, an important symbol of the Cold War days in Germany.

In October 2010, the board of the German rugby federation proposed to discontinue both cup competitions after 2010. This decision required formal approval at the annual conference of the DRV, which was not granted.

== Modus ==
In 2008-09, 16 teams took part in the final rounds of the competition, played in knock-out format. The games are played as single rounds with one club having the home advantage. The final was played on 1 May 2008.

In 2010-11, the competition was played in a different format, with four teams playing a final-four tournament in October 2010.

While not held in 2011–12 the competition returned in 2012–13, now contested between the worst-placed six Bundesliga teams after the first stage of the regular season and the best eight 2nd Bundesliga clubs.

After another league reform in 2015 the DRV-Pokal will now be contested by the Rugby-Bundesliga teams not qualified for the German championship, meaning the teams placed third to eighth in each of the two regional divisions.

== 2016–17 DRV-Pokal ==
The first round:

5 November 2016

RG Heidelberg	100–0	TSV Victoria Linden

5 November 2016

SC Neuenheim	34–5	RC Leipzig

5 November 2016

FC St. Pauli	3–40	DSV 78 Hannover

5 November 2016

RK Heusenstamm	50–0	RC Luxembourg

5 November 2016

RK 03 Berlin	45–10	Hamburger RC

5 November 2016

SC Germania List	21-25	SC 1880 Frankfurt

5 November 2016

TV Pforzheim	25–10	TSV Handschuhsheim

5 November 2016

Berliner Rugby Club	9-45	Heidelberger RK

The quarter finals:

Quarter final
DSV 78 Hannover	23
RG Heidelberg	21
RK Heusenstamm	17
SC 1880 Frankfurt	35
Heidelberger RK	8
SC Neuenheim	23
TV Pforzheim	25
TSV Handschuhsheim	10

Semi final
DSV 78 Hannover	19
SC 1880 Frankfurt	27
SC Neuenheim	16
TV Pforzheim	83

Final
SC 1880 Frankfurt	18
TV Pforzheim	50

== 2015–16 DRV-Pokal ==
The remaining twelve Bundesliga clubs not qualified for the championship play-off entered the DRV-Pokal, the premier rugby union cup competition in Germany. The teams placed third and fourth received a bye for the first round:

The first round saw the teams placed fifth to eighth drawn against each other:

14 May 2016

FC St. Pauli Rugby	7–44	RK Heusenstamm

15 May 2016

Hamburger RC	3–45	SC 1880 Frankfurt

14 May 2016

RC Leipzig	50–0	RU Hohen Neuendorf

14 May 2016

ASV Köln Rugby	0–67	TSV Handschuhsheim

For the quarter-finals teams were not seeded, with the clubs placed third and fourth entering the competition. The quarter finals were scheduled for 4 and 5 June, the semi-finals for 11 and 12 June and the final for 26 June:

Quarter final
RK Heusenstamm	25
SC Neuenheim	38
RG Heidelberg	34
DSV 78 Hannover	7
SC 1880 Frankfurt	59
RC Leipzig	7
TSV Handschuhsheim	50
Berliner Rugby Club	3

Semi final
SC Neuenheim	29
RG Heidelberg	13
SC 1880 Frankfurt	10
TSV Handschuhsheim	21

Final
SC Neuenheim	16
TSV Handschuhsheim	14

== Cup finals ==
The finals of the competition:

Season	Winner	Runner–Up	Result
1961–62	SV Odin Hannover	TSV Victoria Linden	3–0
1962–63	SV Odin Hannover	TSV Victoria Linden	0–0 ^{1}
1963–64	SC Neuenheim	TSV Victoria Linden	9–6
1964–65	TSV Victoria Linden	VfR Döhren	9–3
1965–66	TSV Victoria Linden	SC Elite Hannover	11–9
1966–67	RG Heidelberg	SV Odin Hannover	9–3
1967–68	SC Germania List	SV Odin Hannover	11–9
1968–69	DSV 78 Hannover	TSV Victoria Linden	9–6
1969–70	SV 08 Ricklingen	DSV 78 Hannover	14–11
1970–71	SC Germania List	TSV Victoria Linden	15–0
1971–72	DSV 78 Hannover	TSV Victoria Linden	17–7
1972–73	Heidelberger RK	DSV 78 Hannover	18–9
1973–74	DSV 78 Hannover	RG Heidelberg	17–3
1974–75	SC Neuenheim	RG Heidelberg	15–0
1975–76	Heidelberger RK	TSV Victoria Linden	36–6
1976–77	SC Germania List	RG Heidelberg	22–6
1977–78	SV 08 Ricklingen	TSV Handschuhsheim	6–0
1978–79	DSV 78 Hannover	FV 1897 Linden	16–3
1979–80	SC Germania List	RG Heidelberg	7–3
1980–81	DSV 78 Hannover	DRC Hannover	28–12
1981–82	TSV Victoria Linden	RG Heidelberg	9–3
1982–83	DSV 78 Hannover	Berliner RC	17–3
1983–84	DSV 78 Hannover	SV 08 Ricklingen	14–10
1984–85	DSV 78 Hannover	TSV Victoria Linden	9–3
1985–86	RG Heidelberg	DRC Hannover	13–3
1986–87	not held		
1987–88	SC Neuenheim	Berliner RC	16–0
1988–89	TSV Victoria Linden	SV 08 Ricklingen	13–9
1989–90	DSV 78 Hannover	RG Heidelberg	13–6
1990–91	TSV Victoria Linden	SC Neuenheim	14–10
1991–92	TSV Victoria Linden	SC Neuenheim	9–6
1992–93	TSV Victoria Linden	DSV 78 Hannover	15–12
1993–94	SC Neuenheim	TSV Victoria Linden	24–15
1994–95	RG Heidelberg	SC Neuenheim	26–6
1995–96	DSV 78 Hannover	RG Heidelberg	17–9
1996–97	RG Heidelberg	DRC Hannover	37–13
1997–98	DSV 78 Hannover	SC Neuenheim	29–23
1998–99	SC Neuenheim	DSV 78 Hannover	16–9
1999–2000	SC Germania List	DSV 78 Hannover	18–8
2000–01	SC Neuenheim	TSV Victoria Linden	25–7
2001–02	DRC Hannover	SC Neuenheim	18–11
2002–03	DRC Hannover	Heidelberger RK	68–3
2003–04	RG Heidelberg	DRC Hannover	23–20
2004–05	TSV Handschuhsheim	DRC Hannover	21–18
2005–06	DRC Hannover	RG Heidelberg	25–21
2006–07	SC 1880 Frankfurt	RG Heidelberg	18–13
2007–08	TSV Handschuhsheim	RG Heidelberg	24–23
2008–09	SC 1880 Frankfurt	TSV Handschuhsheim	56–24
2009–10	SC 1880 Frankfurt	SC Neuenheim	20–12
2010–11	Heidelberger RK	SC 1880 Frankfurt	29–0
2011–12	not held		
2012–13	TSV Handschuhsheim	Heidelberger TV	42–10
2013–14	Heidelberger TV	RC Rottweil	11–5
2014–15	Heidelberger TV	RC Rottweil	30–12
2015–16	SC Neuenheim	TSV Handschuhsheim	16–14
2016–17	TV Pforzheim	SC 1880 Frankfurt	50–18

Source:"Die DRV-Pokalsieger". Deutscher Rugby Verband. Archived from the original on 2007-10-25.

- ^{1} Victoria declined to take part in a rematch after a 0–0 score after extra time.

=== Winners ===
As of 2016, this is the standing in the all–time winners list of the German cup:

Club	Cup wins
DSV 78 Hannover	11
TSV Victoria Linden	7
SC Neuenheim	7
SC Germania List	5
RG Heidelberg	5
TSV Handschuhsheim	3
Heidelberger RK	3
SC 1880 Frankfurt	3
DRC Hannover	3
SV Odin Hannover	2
SV 08 Ricklingen	2
Heidelberger TV	2
TV Pforzheim	1
