= 2019 Rugby World Cup qualifying =

Tournament details
- Dates: 2015 – 2018
- No. of nations: 86

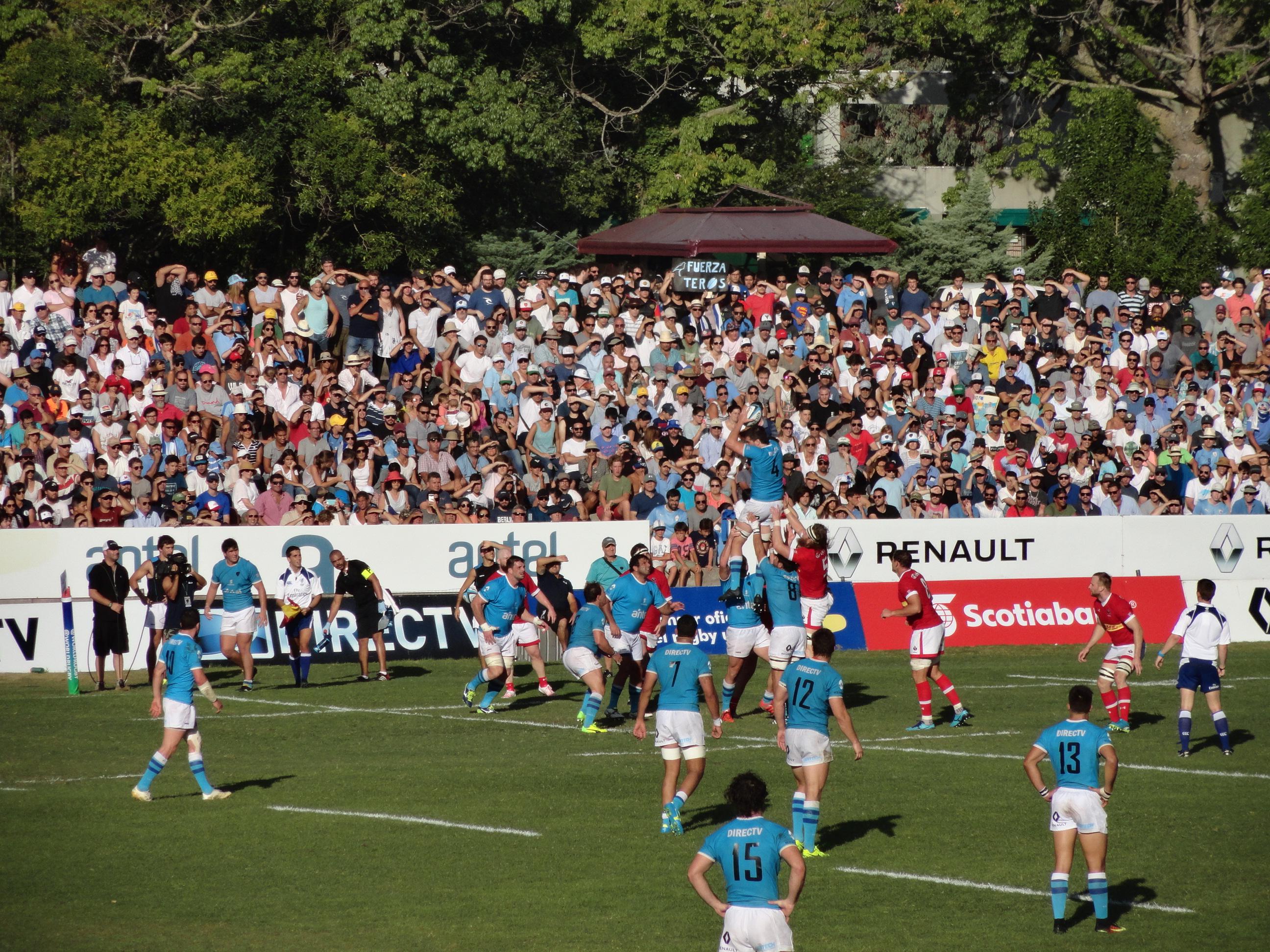
Uruguay v Canada in the Americas play-off.

The qualification process for the 2019 Rugby World Cup in Japan began during the pool stages of the 2015 tournament in England, during which the top three teams from each of the four pools were awarded automatic qualification for the 2019 event. A further eight teams qualified through regional, cross-regional tournaments and the repechage process.

The qualifying matches began on 5 March 2016, when Jamaica defeated Saint Vincent and the Grenadines 48–0. Symbolically, the referee for the match was Nigel Owens, who had refereed the 2015 Rugby World Cup final five months earlier.

== Qualified teams ==
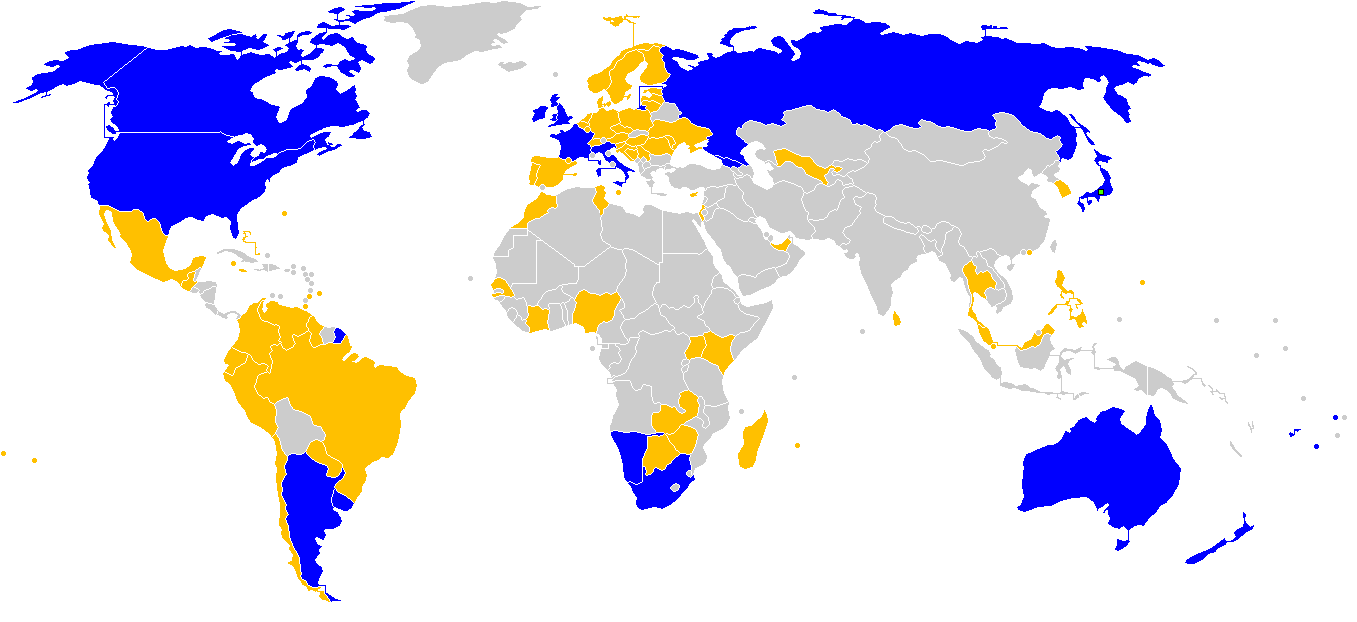
Qualified Did not qualify Did not enter qualification or is not a full member of World Rugby.

	Africa	Americas	Asia	Europe	Oceania
Qualified at the 2015 Rugby World Cup	South Africa	Argentina	Japan (host)	England; France; Georgia; Ireland; Italy; Scotland; Wales	Australia; New Zealand (holders)
Qualified via regional tournament	Namibia (Africa 1)	United States (Americas 1); Uruguay (Americas 2)		Russia (Europe 1)	Fiji (Oceania 1); Tonga (Oceania 2)
Qualified via play-off or repechage		Canada			Samoa

== Qualification process ==
Following confirmation of the twelve automatically qualified teams from the 2015 Rugby World Cup, World Rugby announced the qualification format for the eight remaining places on 12 November 2015. Of the eight berths remaining, six were decided in regional tournaments, one by a cross-regional playoff and the last one via repechage.

A total of 79 teams from around the world were involved in some stage of qualifying. All non-automatic qualifiers were decided by November 2018.

=== Africa ===
Rugby Africa was granted one place at the world cup, awarded to the winner of the Africa Cup (Africa 1). The runner-up (Africa 2) advanced to the repechage tournament. Namibia qualified while Kenya took the runner-up spot.

=== Americas ===
The Americas, encompassing both the Rugby Americas North and Sudamérica Rugby continental regions, was awarded two world cup places for the top teams in the Americas qualification process (Americas 1 and Americas 2). A third team (Americas 3) advanced to the repechage tournament. The United States and Uruguay qualified for the world cup, while Canada (who had previously qualified for every world cup) had to play in the repechage.

=== Asia ===
Asia Rugby, with its top-ranked team hosting the world cup, did not get another direct qualifying place but the Asia Rugby Championship winner (Hong Kong) advanced to an Asia/Oceania playoff for a chance at a repechage berth.

=== Europe ===
Rugby Europe, having seven teams automatically qualified, gained one more world cup berth for the Rugby Europe Championship winner (Europe 1). The runner-up (Europe 2) also had two further chances to qualify, directly via the Europe/Oceania play-off or through the repechage. Romania and Spain finished in first and second places but were deducted points for fielding ineligible players, effectively disqualifying them. As a result, Russia qualified in first place. Germany, who had finished last in the group, advanced to the playoff against division two winners Portugal, which they won, thereby qualifying for a playoff against Samoa.

=== Oceania ===
Oceania Rugby was granted two world cup places for the top teams across 2016 and 2017 in the Pacific Nations Cup (Oceania 1 and Oceania 2). The third-ranked team (Oceania 3) had two further chances to qualify, via the Europe/Oceania play-off or through the repechage. Fiji and Tonga qualified directly while Samoa advanced to a playoff against Germany.

Finally, the top team from the Oceania Cup (Oceania 4) advanced to the Asia/Oceania playoff for a chance to play in the repechage. Tahiti defeated Cook Islands to win the Oceania Cup in 2017 but was disqualified from progressing due to fielding ineligible players so Cook Islands advanced to the playoff against Hong Kong instead.

Qualification by region
Region	Automatic qualifiers	Teams entered in qualifying	Regional qualifying places	Regional tournament qualifying teams	Play-off or repechage places	Play-off or repechage teams
Africa	1	14	1	Namibia	1	Kenya
Americas	1	20	2	United States; Uruguay	1	Canada
Asia	1	10*	0	none	1	Hong Kong
Europe	7	30†	1	Russia ^{‡}	1	Germany ^{§}
Oceania	2	5	2	Fiji; Tonga	2	Samoa
Oceania	2	5	2	Fiji; Tonga	2	Cook Islands ^{‖}
TOTALS	12	79	6	(6 WC places)	6	(2 WC places)

Qualified team

Notes:

* Thailand replaced Kazakhstan following their withdrawal before playing any games.

† Minus one additional team, Turkey, who withdrew prior to playing any games.

‡ Replacing Romania, who had points deducted for fielding an ineligible player.

§ Replacing Spain, who had points deducted for fielding ineligible players.

‖ The Cook Islands advanced to the next stage of qualifying after Tahiti were found to have breached player eligibility regulations in their Oceania Cup clash.

2019 Rugby World Cup – Qualification final stages illustrated

== Play-off and repechage qualification ==
Following the regional tournaments, the next qualification play-off was a home and away series between Germany (as Europe 2) and Samoa (as Oceania 3). Samoa won both matches and qualified for the 2019 Rugby World Cup, while Germany continued to the repechage tournament.

Europe/Oceania play-off qualifier

30 June 2018 and 14 July 2018
Samoa	66	42	108
qualified to RWC to repechage
Germany	15	28	43

The elimination play-off was a home and away series between Hong Kong (as Asia 1) and Cook Islands (as Oceania 4). The Cook Islands team was eliminated with Hong Kong winning both matches to advance to the repechage tournament.

Asia/Oceania play-off eliminator

30 June 2018 and 7 July 2018
Hong Kong	26	51	77
Cook Islands	3	0	3

Repechage tournament final

Four teams took part in the repechage process for the final spot at the World Cup. Unlike previous repechages, the teams played in a round-robin tournament, where all teams played each other once. The repechage tournament was hosted at the neutral venue of the Stade Delort in Marseille, France, in November 2018.

Final standings (continental qualifying path and world ranking of each team before the tournament is shown in brackets):

Place	Nation	Games				Points			Bonus points	Table points
Place	Nation	played	won	drawn	lost	for	against	diff	Bonus points	Table points
1	Canada (Americas) (21)	3	3	0	0	121	39	+82	2	14
2	Germany (Europe) (26)	3	2	0	1	79	44	+35	1	9
3	Hong Kong (Asia) (24)	3	1	0	2	61	70	−9	1	5
4	Kenya (Africa) (29)	3	0	0	3	42	150	−108	0	0
Points were awarded to the teams as follows: 4 points for a win, 2 points for a draw, no points for a loss 1 bonus point for scoring 4 or more tries 1 bonus point for a loss by 7 points or fewer The top-placed team qualified for the 2019 Rugby World Cup as the repechage winner
