= 2019 Rugby World Cup – play-off qualifications =

For the 2019 Rugby World Cup, there were several play-off matches during the qualification process in order to determine which nations would compete in the Repechage. Canada, who failed to be one of the three teams to advance from the Americas qualification process, despite being the third highest ranked team in the Americas, emerged from the repechage process in November 2018 to become the final team to qualify for the World Cup.

== Format ==
=== Europe/Oceania ===
The qualification play-off was a home and away series between Europe 2 and Oceania 3. Europe 2, Germany, was the winner of Round 6 of the European qualification process, while Oceania 3, Samoa, was the third best team of Round 1 of the Oceania qualification process. The winner of this home and away play-off on aggregate qualified to the World Cup as the play-off winner. The loser gained another chance via the World Repechage.

=== Repechage ===
==== Asia/Oceania ====
Prior to the repechage final, Asia 1 and Oceania 4 played-off in a home and away series for the final place. Asia 1 was the winner of Round 3 of the Asian qualification process, while Oceania 4 is Cook Islands. The Cook Islands advanced to the next stage of qualifying for the 2019 Rugby World Cup after Tahiti, the winner of Round 2 of the Oceania qualification process, were found to have breached player eligibility regulations in their Oceania Cup clash the previous year. The winner of this home and away play-off on aggregate, qualified for a place in the World Repechage, while the loser missed out on World Cup qualification.

==== Final tournament ====
The 2019 Rugby World Cup repechage tournament was hosted by a neutral venue: the Pierre-Delort Stadium in Marseille, France. In previous years, the repechage, a last-chance opportunity to qualify for the Rugby World Cup, has followed a knock-out format in line with the rest of the qualification process. The 2019 edition, however, was a round-robin tournament between four teams held during the November test window. Africa and the Americas were guaranteed a repechage place, with the runner-up of the African qualification round 3 (Africa 2) and the losing side of the Americas Repechage play-off gaining positions. The final two places were decided through the above cross-regional play-offs, with the loser of the Europe/Oceania play-off (Europe 2 or Oceania 3) getting another shot at qualification in the repechage, and the winner of the Asia/Oceania play-off for repechage, advancing to the repechage, with no direct place for an Asian team or the lower ranked teams in Oceania. The winner of the World Repechage qualified for the World Cup as the play-off winner (or Repechage 2).

== Teams ==
Six teams progressed to the regional and Repechage play-offs for the final two non-regional seeds in the World Cup; teams world rankings are as per date progressing to the play-off phase and bold nations denotes teams had previously played in a Rugby World Cup.

Nation	Rank	Progression date	Qualifying status
Samoa	15	15 July 2017	Qualified on 14 July 2018
Germany	28	15 May 2018	Eliminated by Canada on 17 November 2018
Cook Islands	55	23 March 2018	Eliminated by Hong Kong on 7 July 2018
Hong Kong	22	2 June 2018	Eliminated by Canada on 23 November 2018
Kenya	28	29 July 2018	Eliminated by Hong Kong on 17 November 2018
Canada	21	3 February 2018	Qualified on 23 November 2018

== Europe/Oceania qualifying play-off ==
Samoa played Germany in a Europe/Oceania play-off for direct qualification to the World Cup. Samoa qualified, winning 108–43 on aggregate, while Germany progressed to the Repechage as runners-up.

30 June 2018
15:10 (UTC+13:00)

Samoa	66–15	Germany
Try: Leiua 9' c Matavao (2) 12' c, 60' c J. Lam 23' c Fidow (3) 28' c, 36' c, 79' m Penalty try 51'; Tekori 71' c Polataivao 73' m Con: Tuala (5/5) 10', 13', 24', 29', 37'; Fa'apale (2/4) 62', 72'	Report	Try: Otto (2) 58' m, 66' c Con: Parkinson (1/2) 67'; Pen: Parkinson (1/1) 11'

Apia Park, Apia
Attendance: 6,100
Referee: Mike Fraser (New Zealand)

Team details

FB	15	Ahsee Tuala	(substituted off) 58'
RW	14	Ed Fidow
OC	13	Paul Perez
IC	12	Alapati Leiua
LW	11	Sinoti Sinoti	(substituted off) 68'
FH	10	Tusi Pisi
SH	9	Melani Matavao	(substituted off) 63'
N8	8	Ofisa Treviranus	(substituted off) 58'
OF	7	Jack Lam
BF	6	Piula Faʻasalele	(substituted off) 51'
RL	5	Chris Vui (c)
LL	4	Josh Tyrell
TP	3	Paul Alo-Emile	(substituted off) 64'
HK	2	Motu Matu'u	14' to 19'		(substituted off) 56'
LP	1	Logovi'i Mulipola	(substituted off) 56'
Replacements:
HK	16	Seilala Lam	(substituted on) 14'	(substituted off) 19'	(substituted on) 56'
PR	17	James Lay	(substituted on) 56'
PR	18	Viliamu Afatia	(substituted on) 64'
LK	19	Joe Tekori	(substituted on) 51'
FL	20	TJ Ioane	(substituted on) 58'
SH	21	Dwayne Polataivao	(substituted on) 63'
FH	22	Patrick Fa'apale	(substituted on) 58'
WG	23	Alofa Alofa	(substituted on) 68'
Coach:
(Samoa) Fuimaono Tafua

FB	15	Maxime Oltmann
RW	14	Marcel Coetzee
OC	13	Steffen Liebig	(substituted off) 70'
IC	12	Raynor Parkinson
LW	11	Nikolai Klewinghaus	(substituted off) 68'
FH	10	Chris Hilsenbeck
SH	9	Sean Armstrong	(substituted off) 27'	(substituted on) 39'	(substituted off) 76'
N8	8	Sebastian Ferreira
OF	7	Jaco Otto	(substituted off) 76'
BF	6	Marcel Henn
RL	5	Eric Marks
LL	4	Timo Vollenkemper	(substituted off) 53'
TP	3	Samy Füchsel	(substituted off) 63'
HK	2	Mika Tyumenev	(substituted off) 63'
LP	1	Julius Nostadt (c)	(substituted off) 63'
Replacements:
HK	16	Mark Fairhurst	(substituted on) 63'
N8	17	Jarrid Els	(substituted on) 53'
PR	18	Jörn Schröder	(substituted on) 63'
PR	19	Anthony Dickinson	(substituted on) 63'
FL	20	Falk Duwe	(substituted on) 76'
SH	21	Tim Menzel	(substituted on) 27'	(substituted off) 39'	(substituted on) 76'
WG	22	Pierre Mathurin	(substituted on) 68'
WG	23	Pascal Fischer	(substituted on) 70'
Coach:
(Uruguay) Pablo Lemoine

Touch judges:
Cam Stone (New Zealand)
Richard Kelly (New Zealand)

Notes:

- This was the first time these two nations have met.
- This was Samoa's 100th test victory, and their first since their 25–23 win over Canada in November 2016.

14 July 2018
16:00 (UTC+2:00)

Germany	28–42	Samoa
Try: Otto 8' c Fuchsel 17' m Els 49' c Con: Parkinson (1/2) 9'; Hilsenbeck (1/1) 50'; Pen: Hilsenbeck (2/2) 40', 64'; Coetzee (1/2) 66'	Report	Try: Fidow (2) 1' c, 75' c Matavao (2) 35' c, 46' c Tuala (2) 69' c, 79' c Con: Tuala (6/6) 2', 36', 47', 70', 76'. 80'

Fritz-Grunebaum-Sportpark, Heidelberg
Attendance: 3,046
Referee: Matthew Carley (England)

Team details

FB	15	Chris Hilsenbeck
RW	14	Raphael Pyrasch
OC	13	Mathieu Ducau
IC	12	Raynor Parkinson	(substituted off) 22'
LW	11	Marcel Coetzee	(substituted off) 76'
FH	10	Hagen Schulte	(substituted off) 67'
SH	9	Sean Armstrong (c)
N8	8	Jarrid Els
OF	7	Jaco Otto
BF	6	Sebastian Ferreira	(substituted off) 60'
RL	5	Timo Vollenkemper
LL	4	Eric Marks	(substituted off) 70'
TP	3	Samy Füchsel	(substituted off) 54'
HK	2	Mark Fairhurst	(substituted off) 54'
LP	1	Julius Nostadt	(substituted off) 47'
Replacements:
HK	16	Mika Tyumenev	(substituted on) 54'
N8	17	Luke Dyckhoff	(substituted on) 70'
PR	18	Jörn Schröder	(substituted on) 47'
PR	19	Matthias Schosser	(substituted on) 54'
FL	20	Marcel Henn	(substituted on) 60'
SH	21	Tim Menzel	(substituted on) 67'
FB	22	Nikolai Klewinghaus	(substituted on) 22'
WG	23	Florian Wehrspann	(substituted on) 76'
Coach:
(Uruguay) Pablo Lemoine

FB	15	Ahsee Tuala
RW	14	Ed Fidow
OC	13	Paul Perez
IC	12	Tusi Pisi
LW	11	Sinoti Sinoti	(substituted off) 76'
FH	10	Patrick Fa'apale	(substituted off) 76'
SH	9	Melani Matavao	(substituted off) 62'
N8	8	Ofisa Treviranus	(substituted off) 74'
OF	7	Jack Lam
BF	6	Chris Vui (c)
RL	5	Brandon Nansen	(substituted off) 58'
LL	4	Joe Tekori
TP	3	Paul Alo-Emile	(substituted off) 58'
HK	2	Motu Matu'u	(substituted off) 40'
LP	1	Logovi'i Mulipola	(substituted off) 62'
Replacements:
HK	16	Seilala Lam	(substituted on) 40'
PR	17	Jordan Lay	(substituted on) 62'
PR	18	Viliamu Afatia	(substituted on) 58'
N8	19	Mat Luamanu	(substituted on) 74'
FL	20	TJ Ioane	(substituted on) 58'
SH	21	Ionatana Tino	(substituted on) 62'
FH	22	Rodney Iona	(substituted on) 76'
WG	23	Alofa Alofa	(substituted on) 76'
Coach:
(Samoa) Fuimaono Tafua

Touch judges:
Craig Maxwell-Keys (England)
Ian Tempest (England)

Notes:

- Ionatana Tino (Samoa) made his international debut.

== Repechage ==
On 12 July 2018, World Rugby announced that the repechage tournament would be hosted at the neutral venue of the Pierre-Delort Stadium in Marseille, France.

=== Asia/Oceania play-off ===
The winner of this home and away play-off, Hong Kong, earned the right to compete in the repechage after winning the series 77–3 on aggregate.

30 June 2018
15:00 (UTC−10:00)

Cook Islands	3–26	Hong Kong
Pen: G. Mullany (1/1) 18'	Report	Try: Lamboley 3' m Slatem 12' m Hartley 29' m Woodward 70' m Pen: Rosslee (2/2) 41', 53'

Avarua Tereora Stadium, Rarotonga
Attendance: 1,500
Referee: Brendon Pickerill (New Zealand)

Team details

FB	15	Marnus Hanley		(substituted off) 48'
RW	14	Brynn Uriarau
OC	13	Gene Te Amo
IC	12	Greg Mullany		(substituted off) 61'
LW	11	Jamian Iroa
FH	10	Reece Joyce
SH	9	Walter Koteka		(substituted off) 62'
N8	8	Tyrone Viiga
OF	7	Eru Smith-Wano
BF	6	Robert Heather			(substituted off) 77'
RL	5	Shahn Eru		(substituted off) 24'
LL	4	James Kora
TP	3	Alan Campbell		(substituted off) 77'
HK	2	Sam Anderson-Heather (c)		(substituted off) 73'	(substituted on) 77'
LP	1	James Pakoti		(substituted off) 74'
Replacements:
PR	16	Tuakana Paitai		(substituted on) 77'
HK	17	Matthew Mullany	(yellow card) 74'	(substituted on) 73'
PR	18	Alex Matapo		(substituted on) 74'
LK	19	Tokerau Raru			(substituted on) 63'
LK	20	Tai Marsters		(substituted on) 24'	(substituted off) 63'
SH	21	Othniel Joseph		(substituted on) 62'
FH	22	Josh Tinomana		(substituted on) 61'
FB	23	Matamanea Matapakia		(substituted on) 48'
Coach:
Stan Wright

FB	15	Jack Neville
RW	14	Salom Yiu	(substituted off) 73'
OC	13	Max Woodward
IC	12	Lex Kaleca	(substituted off) 61'
LW	11	Conor Hartley
FH	10	Matthew Rosslee
SH	9	Liam Slatem	(substituted off) 43'
N8	8	Thomas Lamboley	(substituted off) 50'
OF	7	Toby Fenn
BF	6	Nicholas Hewson	(substituted off) 72'
RL	5	Jack Delaforce
LL	4	James Cunningham (c)
TP	3	Dylan Rogers	(substituted off) 72'
HK	2	Jamie Tsang
LP	1	Daniel Barlow	(substituted off) 67'
Replacements:
HK	16	Alexander Post
PR	17	Adam Fullgrabe	(substituted on) 67'
PR	18	Jack Parfitt	(substituted on) 72'
LK	19	Michael Parfitt	(substituted on) 72'
FL	20	Kane Boucaut	(substituted on) 50'
SH	21	Jamie Lauder	(substituted on) 43'
WG	22	Max Denmark	(substituted on) 73'
CE	23	Jamie Hood	(substituted on) 61'
Coach:
(Wales) Leigh Jones

Touch judges:
Angus Mabey (New Zealand)
Mike Winter (New Zealand)

Notes:

- This was the first time these two nations have met.

7 July 2018
16:30 HKT (UTC+08)

Hong Kong	51–0	Cook Islands
Try: Yiu 11' c Woodward 26' c Hood 54' c Post (2) 57' c, 67' c Penalty try 64'; Con: Rosslee (5/5) 12', 27', 55', 58', 69'; Pen: Rosslee (2/2) 22', 46'; Drop: Rimene (1/1) 65'	Report

Hong Kong Football Club Stadium, Hong Kong
Attendance: 2,000
Referee: Damon Murphy (Australia)

Team details

FB	15	Jack Neville		(substituted off) 3'
RW	14	Salom Yiu
OC	13	Max Woodward
IC	12	Lex Kaleca		(substituted off) 58'
LW	11	Max Denmark
FH	10	Matthew Rosslee
SH	9	Cado Lee Ka To		(substituted off) 48'
N8	8	Thomas Lamboley		(substituted off) 58'
OF	7	Toby Fenn
BF	6	Nicholas Hewson
RL	5	Jack Delaforce		(substituted off) 51'
LL	4	James Cunningham (c)
TP	3	Dylan Rogers		(substituted off) 55'
HK	2	Ben Roberts		(substituted off) 55'
LP	1	Adam Fullgrabe		(substituted off) 40'
Replacements:
HK	16	Alexander Post		(substituted on) 55'
PR	17	Daniel Barlow		(substituted on) 40'
PR	18	Jack Parfitt		(substituted on) 55'
LK	19	Michael Parfitt		(substituted on) 51'
FL	20	Kane Boucaut		(substituted on) 58'
SH	21	Jamie Lauder		(substituted on) 48'
FH	22	Ben Rimene		(substituted on) 58'
CE	23	Jamie Hood	(yellow card) 31'	(substituted on) 3'
Coach:
(Wales) Leigh Jones

FB	15	Marnus Hanley	(yellow card) 25'	(substituted off) 59'
RW	14	Brynn Uriarau
OC	13	Christian Vainerere
IC	12	Gene Te Amo		(substituted off) 71'
LW	11	Jamian Iroa
FH	10	Reece Joyce		(substituted off) 63'
SH	9	Walter Koteka
N8	8	Tyrone Viiga	(yellow card) 60'
OF	7	Eru Smith-Wano	(yellow card) 69'	(substituted off) 16'	(substituted on) 25'	(substituted off) 79'
BF	6	Robert Heather				(substituted off) 64'
RL	5	Shahn Eru
LL	4	James Kora		(substituted off) 70'
TP	3	James Pakoti		(substituted off) 59'
HK	2	Sam Anderson-Heather (c)		(substituted off) 71'		(substituted on) 79'
LP	1	Alan Campbell		(substituted off) 59'
Replacements:
HK	16	Matthew Mullany	(yellow card) 72'	(substituted on) 71'
PR	17	Alex Matapo		(substituted on) 59'
PR	18	Tuakana Paitai		(substituted on) 59'
LK	19	Tokerau Raru		(substituted on) 70'
LK	20	Tama Nicholas		(substituted on) 16'	(substituted off) 25'	(substituted on) 64'
SH	21	Te Ara Henderson		(substituted on) 63'
FB	22	Matamanea Matapakia		(substituted on) 59'
FH	23	Jamian Iroa		(substituted on) 71'
Coach:
Stan Wright

Touch judges:
Shuhei Kubo (Japan)
Tasuku Kawahari (Japan)

=== Repechage final tournament ===
==== Teams and table ====
Qualified as repechage winner

Final standings (continental qualifying path of each team and world ranking in brackets):

Place	Nation	Games				Points			Bonus points	Table points
Place	Nation	Played	Won	Drawn	Lost	For	Against	Diff	Bonus points	Table points
1	Canada (Americas) (21)	3	3	0	0	121	39	+82	2	14
2	Germany (Europe) (26)	3	2	0	1	79	44	+35	1	9
3	Hong Kong (Asia) (24)	3	1	0	2	61	70	−9	1	5
4	Kenya (Africa) (29)	3	0	0	3	42	150	−108	0	0
Points were awarded to the teams as follows: 4 points for a win, 2 points for a draw, no points for a loss 1 bonus point for scoring 4 or more tries 1 bonus point for a loss by 7 points or under

==== Fixtures ====
===== Round 1 =====
11 November 2018
13:00 CET

(1 BP) Canada	65–19	Kenya
Try: Van der Merwe (3) 9' c, 29' m, 76' c Beukeboom (2) 12' m, 61' c Sauder (2) 39' c, 54' m Ardron 50' c Sheppard 69' c Evans 70' m Con: McRorie (5/9) 10', 40', 51', 62', 69'; Sauder (1/1) 77'; Pen: McRorie (1/1) 2'	Report	Try: Onyango 17' m Owade 32' c Nyambua 43' c Con: Mukidza (1/2) 43'; Oliech (1/1) 32'

Pierre-Delort Stadium, Marseille
Referee: Wayne Barnes (England)

Team details

FB	15	Theo Sauder
RW	14	Matt Evans
OC	13	Ben LeSage		(substituted off) 63'
IC	12	Nick Blevins		(substituted off) 47'
LW	11	D. T. H. van der Merwe
FH	10	Gordon McRorie
SH	9	Phil Mack (c)		(substituted off) 70'
N8	8	Tyler Ardron		(substituted off) 72'
OF	7	Matt Heaton	(yellow card) 7'	(substituted off) 45'
BF	6	Kyle Baillie
RL	5	Evan Olmstead
LL	4	Brett Beukeboom		(substituted off) 62'
TP	3	Jake Ilnicki		(substituted off) 45'
HK	2	Ray Barkwill
LP	1	Hubert Buydens		(substituted off) 63'
Replacements:
PR	16	Eric Howard		(substituted on) 72'
HK	17	Djustice Sears-Duru		(substituted on) 63'
PR	18	Matt Tierney		(substituted on) 45'
FL	19	Mike Sheppard		(substituted on) 62'
FL	20	Lucas Rumball		(substituted on) 45'
SH	21	Jamie Mackenzie		(substituted on) 70'
CE	22	Ciaran Hearn		(substituted on) 47'
WG	23	Conor Trainor		(substituted on) 63'
Coach:
(Wales) Kingsley Jones

FB	15	Tony Onyango	(substituted off) 48'
RW	14	Darwin Mukidza
OC	13	Collins Injera
IC	12	Leo Seje Owade
LW	11	Willy Ambaka	(substituted off) 66'
FH	10	Samuel Oliech
SH	9	Samson Onsomu	(substituted off) 57'
N8	8	Josh Chisanga
OF	7	Davis Chenge (c)	(substituted off) 48'
BF	6	Andrew Amonde
RL	5	Malcolm Onsando
LL	4	George Nyambua	(substituted off) 64'
TP	3	Joseph Odero	(substituted off) 64'
HK	2	Colman Were	(substituted off) 65'
LP	1	Patrick Ouko	(substituted off) 64'
Replacements:
HK	16	Philip Ikambili	(substituted on) 65'
PR	17	Moses Amusala	(substituted on) 64'
PR	18	Hillary Mwanjilwa	(substituted on) 64'
LK	19	Wilson Kopondo	(substituted on) 64'
LK	20	Oliver Mang'eni	(substituted on) 48'
SH	21	Mohammed Omollo	(substituted on) 57'
CE	22	William Reeve	(substituted on) 66'
FB	23	Martin Owilah	(substituted on) 48'
Coach:
(New Zealand) Ian Snook

Touch judges:
Joy Neville (Ireland)
Anthony Woodthorpe (England)
Television match official:
Olly Hodges (Ireland)

Notes:

- Mike Sheppard (Canada) and William Reeve (Kenya) made their international debuts.
- This was the first ever meeting between the two nations.

11 November 2018
16:00 CET (UTC+01)

Hong Kong	9–26	Germany
Pen: Rosslee (3/3) 10', 26', 52'	Report	Try: Haupt 66' c Schösser 77' c Con: Parkinson (2/2) 67', 78'; Pen: Parkinson (3/4) 23', 49', 60'; Hilsenbeck (1/1) 38'

Pierre-Delort Stadium, Marseille
Referee: Pascal Gaüzère (France)

Team details

FB	15	Casey Stone
RW	14	Salom Yiu
OC	13	Tyler Spitz		(substituted off) 72'
IC	12	Max Woodward
LW	11	Conor Hartley
FH	10	Matthew Rosslee		(substituted off) 72'
SH	9	Liam Slatem		(substituted off) 79'
N8	8	Thomas Lamboley
OF	7	Michael Coverdale
BF	6	Michael Parfitt		(substituted off) 55'
RL	5	Jack Delaforce		(substituted off) 56'
LL	4	James Cunningham (c)
TP	3	Grant Kemp		(substituted off) 51'
HK	2	Dayne Jans		(substituted off) 65'
LP	1	Daniel Barlow		(substituted off) 51'
Replacements:
HK	16	Ben Roberts		(substituted on) 65'
PR	17	Benjamin Higgins		(substituted on) 51'
PR	18	Jack Parfitt		(substituted on) 51'
LK	19	Fin Field		(substituted on) 56'
FL	20	Kane Boucaut	(yellow card) 61'	(substituted on) 55'
SH	21	Bryn Phillips		(substituted on) 79'
FB	22	Jamie Hood		(substituted on) 72'
CE	23	Lewis Warner		(substituted on) 72'
Coach:
(Wales) Leigh Jones

FB	15	Chris Hilsenbeck
RW	14	Marcel Coetzee
OC	13	Wynston Cameron-Dow
IC	12	Jamie Murphy
LW	11	Mathieu Ducau	(substituted off) 28'
FH	10	Raynor Parkinson	35' to 40'
SH	9	Sean Armstrong (c)
N8	8	Jarrid Els	(substituted off) 73'
OF	7	Jaco Otto
BF	6	Sebastian Ferreira
RL	5	Erik Marks	(substituted off) 76'
LL	4	Michael Poppmeier	(substituted off) 63'
TP	3	Samy Füchsel	(substituted off) 51'
HK	2	Kurt Haupt
LP	1	Julius Nostadt	(substituted off) 63'
Replacements:
HK	16	Dash Barber
PR	17	Jörn Schröder	(substituted on) 63'
PR	18	Matthias Schösser	(substituted on) 51'
LK	19	Timo Vollenkemper	(substituted on) 76'
FL	20	Ayron Schramm	(substituted on) 59'
SH	21	Tim Menzel	(substituted on) 35'	(substituted off) 40'
FH	22	Jonathon Dawe	(substituted on) 73'
CE	23	Carlos Soteras-Merz	(substituted on) 28'
Coach:
(England) Mike Ford

Touch judges:
George Clancy (Ireland)
Sara Cox (England)
Television match official:
Olly Hodges (Ireland)

Notes:

- Grant Kemp, Bryn Phillips, Casey Stone and Lewis Warner (all Hong Kong) and Jonathon Dawe and Kurt Haupt (both Germany) made their international debuts.

===== Round 2 =====
17 November 2018
13:00 CET (UTC+01)

(1BP) Hong Kong	42–17	Kenya
Try: Denmark 29' c Hewson 49' c Fenn 54' c Lamboley (2) 64' c, 70' c Warner 81' c Con: Rimene (4/4) 30', 50', 55', 65'; Rosslee (2/2) 71', 83'	Report	Try: Opondo (2) 16' c, 57' m Musonye 22' m Con: Oliech (1/3) 17'

Pierre-Delort Stadium, Marseille
Attendance: 1,500
Referee: Jaco Peyper (South Africa)

Team details

FB	15	Jamie Hood
RW	14	Salom Yiu
OC	13	Tyler Spitz	(substituted off) 67'
IC	12	Ben Axten-Burrett
LW	11	Max Denmark
FH	10	Ben Rimene	(substituted off) 67'
SH	9	Bryn Phillips	(substituted off) 40'
N8	8	Kane Boucaut	(substituted off) 27'
OF	7	Toby Fenn	(substituted off) 71'
BF	6	Nicholas Hewson	(substituted off) 55'
RL	5	Fin Field
LL	4	James Cunningham (c)
TP	3	Dylan Rogers	(substituted off) 27'
HK	2	Ben Roberts	(substituted off) 50'
LP	1	Benjamin Higgins	(substituted off) 40'
Replacements:
HK	16	Dayne Jans	(substituted on) 50'
PR	17	Daniel Barlow	(substituted on) 40'
PR	18	Jack Parfitt	(substituted on) 27'
FL	19	Michael Parfitt	(substituted on) 71'
N8	20	Thomas Lamboley	(substituted on) 27'
SH	21	Liam Slatem	(substituted on) 40'
FH	22	Matthew Rosslee	(substituted on) 67'
CE	23	Lewis Warner	(substituted on) 67'
Coach:
(Wales) Leigh Jones

FB	15	Tony Onyango	(substituted off) 71'
RW	14	Nelson Oyoo
OC	13	Collins Injera
IC	12	Leo Seje Owade
LW	11	Willy Ambaka
FH	10	Samuel Oliech	(substituted off) 67'
SH	9	Felix Ayange	(substituted off) 48'
N8	8	Josh Chisanga
OF	7	Elkeans Musonye	(substituted off) 67'
BF	6	Andrew Amonde	(substituted off) 67'
RL	5	Malcolm Onsando
LL	4	Wilson Kopondo (c)
TP	3	Joseph Odero	(substituted off) 58'
HK	2	Colman Were	(substituted off) 67'
LP	1	Patrick Ouko	(substituted off) 67'
Replacements:
HK	16	Philip Ikambili	(substituted on) 67'
PR	17	Ephraim Oduor	(substituted on) 67'
PR	18	Hillary Mwanjilwa	(substituted on) 58'
LK	19	George Nyambua	(substituted on) 67'
FB	20	Martin Owilah	(substituted on) 71'
SH	21	Samson Onsomu	(substituted on) 48'
CE	22	William Reeve	(substituted on) 67'
FL	23	Dalmus Chituyi	(substituted on) 67'
Coach:
(New Zealand) Ian Snook

Touch judges:
George Clancy (Ireland)
Thomas Charabas (France)
Television match official:
Graham Hughes (England)

17 November 2018
16:00 CET (UTC+01)

(1BP) Canada	29–10	Germany
Try: Rumball 23' c Ardron 43' c Evans 68' m McRorie 72' c Con: McRorie (3/4) 24', 44', 73'; Pen: McRorie (1/1) 14'	Report	Try: Barber 30' c Con: Parkinson (1/1) 31'; Pen: Parkinson (1/1) 47'

Pierre-Delort Stadium, Marseille
Referee: Luke Pearce (England)

Team details

FB	15	Theo Sauder
RW	14	Matt Evans
OC	13	Ben LeSage	(substituted off) 74'
IC	12	Ciaran Hearn	(substituted off) 74'
LW	11	D. T. H. van der Merwe	(substituted off) 77'
FH	10	Gordon McRorie
SH	9	Phil Mack (c)
N8	8	Tyler Ardron
OF	7	Lucas Rumball	(substituted off) 60'
BF	6	Kyle Baillie	(substituted off) 34'	(substituted on) 40'
RL	5	Evan Olmstead
LL	4	Mike Sheppard	(substituted off) 60'
TP	3	Matt Tierney	(substituted off) 53'
HK	2	Ray Barkwill	(substituted off) 77'
LP	1	Hubert Buydens	(substituted off) 53'
Replacements:
HK	16	Eric Howard	(substituted on) 72'
PR	17	Djustice Sears-Duru	(substituted on) 53'
PR	18	Jake Ilnicki	(substituted on) 53'
LL	19	Brett Beukeboom	(substituted on) 60'
FL	20	Matt Heaton	(substituted on) 34'	(substituted off) 40'	(substituted on) 60'
SH	21	Jamie Mackenzie	(substituted on) 77'
CE	22	Nick Blevins	(substituted on) 74'
WG	23	Conor Trainor	(substituted on) 74'
Coach:
(Wales) Kingsley Jones

FB	15	Chris Hilsenbeck
RW	14	Marcel Coetzee	(substituted off) 74'
OC	13	Wynston Cameron-Dow	(substituted off) 50'
IC	12	Jamie Murphy
LW	11	Carlos Soteras-Merz
FH	10	Raynor Parkinson
SH	9	Sean Armstrong (c)	(substituted off) 77'
N8	8	Jarrid Els
OF	7	Jaco Otto	(substituted off) 60'	(substituted on) 70'
BF	6	Sebastian Ferreira
RL	5	Erik Marks	(substituted off) 74'
LL	4	Michael Poppmeier	(substituted off) 70'
TP	3	Samy Füchsel	(substituted off) 60'
HK	2	Kurt Haupt	28' to 36'		(substituted off) 74'
LP	1	Julius Nostadt	(substituted off) 60'
Replacements:
HK	16	Dash Barber	(substituted on) 28'	(substituted off) 36'	(substituted on) 74'
PR	17	Jörn Schröder	(substituted on) 60'
PR	18	Matthias Schösser	(substituted on) 60'
LK	19	Timo Vollenkemper	(substituted on) 74'
FL	20	Ayron Schramm	(substituted on) 60'
SH	21	Tim Menzel	(substituted on) 77'
FH	22	Hagen Schulte	(substituted on) 50'
CE	23	Harris Aounallah	(substituted on) 74'
Coach:
(England) Mike Ford

Touch judges:
Sara Cox (England)
Thomas Charabas (France)
Television match official:
Graham Hughes (England)

===== Round 3 =====
23 November 2018
18:00 CET (UTC+01)

Kenya	6–43	Germany (1 BP)
Pen: Oliech (2/3) 2', 38'	Report	Try: Ferreira 22'c, 58'c, 70'c Haupt 40+1'm Otto 45'c Leibig 50'c Aounallah 79'c Con: Parkinson (5/7) 22', 46', 52', 71', 80+1'

Pierre-Delort Stadium, Marseille
Referee: Angus Gardner (Australia)

23 November 2018
21:00 CET (UTC+01)

Hong Kong	10–27	Canada
Try: Hartley 53'c Con: Rosslee (1/1) 54'; Pen: Rosslee (1/1) 31'	Report	Try: Barkwill 18'c Van De Merwe 32'c, 70'c Con: McRorie (3/3) 19', 33', 72'; Pen: McRorie (2/3) 62', 67'

Pierre-Delort Stadium, Marseille
Referee: Romain Poite (France)
