= Mark Kuhlmann =

Germany international rugby union player

- Born: Mark Kuhlmann; 18 August 1969 (age 57)
- Height: 1.80 m (5 ft 11 in)
- Weight: 92 kg (14 st 7 lb)

Rugby union career
- Position: Centre
Amateur team(s)
Years	Team	Apps	(Points)
2008	DRC Hannover		
2008 -	SC Neuenheim		
- Correct as of 1 April 2010
International career
Years	Team	Apps	(Points)
- Germany
- Correct as of 22 March 2010
Coaching career
- Years: Team
- 2008: DRC Hannover
- 2006 - 2009: Germany (assistant)
- 2008 - 2012: SC Neuenheim
- 2012 - 2019: Neckarsulmer SU
- 2019: Germany (interim)
- 2019 - 2020: TSV Handschuhsheim
- 2020 -: Germany

Mark Kuhlmann (born 18 August 1969) is a retired German international rugby union player, having played for the DRC Hannover in the Rugby-Bundesliga and the German national rugby union team. He captained Germany for a lengthy period of time during his career in the national team. He is, behind Horst Kemmling, Germany's second-most capped rugby player.

Kuhlmann was, from 2008 to 2012, the coach of SC Neuenheim. Before joining Neuenheim in 2008, Kuhlmann had spent his entire coaching and playing career with the DRC Hannover, in an era when DRC took out six German championships and three national cup wins.

In March 2009, Kuhlmann stepped down as joint coach of Germany after three and a half years in office, while the other two coaches Rudolf Finsterer and Bruno Stolorz, remained in the job.

After not having played in 2008-09, he made one appearance for SCN in the 2009-10 Bundesliga season. Kuhlmann indicated that the 2011-12 season would be his last as coach of SCN, is contract not being extended at the end of the season.

== Honours ==
=== Club ===
- German rugby union championship
  - Champions: 1998, 1999, 2000, 2001, 2002, 2005
  - Runners up: 2003, 2004
- German rugby union cup
  - Winner: 2002, 2003, 2006
  - Runners up: 1997, 2004, 2005
- German sevens championship
  - Runners up: 1999

== Stats ==
Mark Kuhlmann's personal statistics in club and international rugby:

=== Club ===
Year	Club	Division	Games	Tries	Con	Pen	DG	Place
2009-10	SC Neuenheim	Rugby-Bundesliga	1	0	0	0	0	5th

- As of 18 May 2010
