= 2019 Rugby World Cup – Europe qualification =

Tournament details
- Dates: 1 October 2016 – 16 June 2018
- No. of nations: 31

Qualifying for the 2019 Rugby World Cup for European Rugby began in September 2016, where 5 teams are competing for one direct qualification spot into the final tournament, and a further 26 teams competing, alongside the initial 5 teams, for a place in the Europe/Oceania play-off and or repechage.

The qualification process came to a chaotic conclusion when 3 of the 5 teams in the 2017 and 2018 editions of the Rugby Europe Championship were effectively disqualified for fielding ineligible players. As a result, Russia qualified for the World Cup and Germany advanced to a playoff against Portugal for a place in the repechage process.

== Format ==
The Rugby Europe Championship, controlled by Rugby Europe, is the regional qualification tournament for Rugby World Cup 2019, with the Championship, Trophy and Conference 1 and 2 being involved in the process.

The 2016–17 Rugby Europe International Championships form the majority of qualification matches for the European region. The respective winners of Round 1A and 1B, Rugby Europe Conference 2 North and South, will progress to the Round 1 Final. The overall winner of Round 1, will advance to the Round 3, where they will play against the winner of Round 2, Conference 1. The winner of Round 3 will play against the winner of the 2016–17 Rugby Europe Trophy tournament in the Round 4 Final, where the winner of that final will parachute down to Round 6 - the European Final play-off.

The winner of Round 5, which is an aggregate table of the 2017 and 2018 Rugby Europe Championship's, will qualify for the World Cup as Europe 1, the runner-up will advance to Round 6.

Round 6 will see the winner of Round 4 and the runner-up of Round 5 face against each other in a one-off play-off match, the higher ranked team hosting at the time of teams decided, to earn the right to progress to a home and away Cross-Regional play-off series against the third placed team from Oceania, Oceania 3.

== Entrants ==
Thirty-one teams competed for the 2019 Rugby World Cup – European qualification; teams world rankings are prior to the first European qualification match on 3 September 2016.

| Nation | Rank | Began play | Qualifying status |
|---|---|---|---|
| Andorra | 62 | 22 October 2016 | Eliminated by Malta on 11 February 2017 |
| Austria | 87 | 8 October 2016 | Eliminated by Serbia on 29 April 2017 |
| Belgium | 24 | 18 February 2017 | Eliminated via points deduction on 15 May 2018 |
| Bosnia and Herzegovina | 74 | 8 October 2016 | Eliminated by Hungary on 20 May 2017 |
| Croatia | 54 | 29 October 2016 | Eliminated by Malta on 29 April 2017 |
| Cyprus | NR | 29 October 2016 | Eliminated by Andorra on 11 February 2017 |
| Czech Republic | 33 | 3 September 2016 | Eliminated by Portugal on 18 November 2017 |
| Denmark | 88 | 8 October 2016 | Eliminated by Hungary's victory on 6 May 2017 |
| England | 2 | N/A | Qualified with Top 12 finish at 2015 World Cup |
| Estonia | NR | 1 October 2016 | Eliminated by Hungary's victory on 22 April 2017 |
| Finland | 97 | 8 October 2016 | Eliminated by Denmark on 22 April 2017 |
| France | 8 | N/A | Qualified with Top 12 finish at 2015 World Cup |
| Georgia | 11 | N/A | Qualified with Top 12 finish at 2015 World Cup |
| Germany | 26 | 11 February 2017 | Advances to Europe/Oceania play-off on 16 June 2018 |
| Hungary | 82 | 1 October 2016 | Eliminated by Czech Republic on 27 April 2017 |
| Ireland | 6 | N/A | Qualified with Top 12 finish at 2015 World Cup |
| Israel | 63 | 5 November 2016 | Eliminated by Malta on 22 April 2017 |
| Italy | 13 | N/A | Qualified with Top 12 finish at 2015 World Cup |
| Latvia | 51 | 22 October 2016 | Eliminated by Czech Republic on 15 April 2017 |
| Lithuania | 46 | 5 November 2016 | Eliminated by Czech Republic's victory on 6 May 2017 |
| Luxembourg | 59 | 22 October 2016 | Eliminated by Czech Republic's victory on 15 April 2017 |
| Malta | 49 | 22 October 2016 | Eliminated by Czech Republic on 20 May 2017 |
| Moldova | 32 | 12 November 2016 | Eliminated by Portugal on 11 March 2017 |
| Netherlands | 34 | 5 November 2016 | Eliminated by Portugal's victory on 1 April 2017 |
| Norway | 90 | 8 October 2016 | Eliminated by Hungary on 22 April 2017 |
| Poland | 37 | 24 September 2016 | Eliminated by Portugal on 18 March 2017 |
| Portugal | 30 | 19 November 2016 | Eliminated by Germany on 16 June 2018 |
| Romania | 16 | 11 February 2017 | Eliminated via points deduction on 15 May 2018 |
| Russia | 21 | 12 February 2017 | Qualified as Europe 1 via mass points deduction on 15 May 2018 |
| Scotland | 9 | N/A | Qualified with Top 12 finish at 2015 World Cup |
| Serbia | 79 | 29 October 2016 | Eliminated by Bosnia and Herzegovina on 22 April 2017 |
| Slovenia | 67 | 29 October 2016 | Eliminated by Austria on 22 April 2017 |
| Spain | 23 | 12 February 2017 | Eliminated via points deduction on 15 May 2018 |
| Sweden | 58 | 3 September 2016 | Eliminated by Latvia on 29 April 2017 |
| Switzerland | 31 | 19 November 2016 | Eliminated by Netherlands on 18 March 2017 |
| Turkey | NR | 5 November 2016 | Withdrew from competition on 5 November 2016 |
| Ukraine | 27 | 24 September 2016 | Eliminated by Portugal's victory on 4 March 2017 |
| Wales | 5 | N/A | Qualified with Top 12 finish at 2015 World Cup |

== Round 1: Rugby Europe Conference 2 ==
=== Round 1A: North ===
Advances to Round 1 Final

| Place | Nation | Games | | | | Points | | | Bonus points | Table points |
| Place | Nation | played | won | drawn | lost | for | against | diff | Bonus points | Table points |
|---|---|---|---|---|---|---|---|---|---|---|
| 1 | Hungary | 4 | 4 | 0 | 0 | 157 | 30 | +127 | 3 | 19 |
| 2 | Denmark | 4 | 3 | 0 | 1 | 161 | 42 | +119 | 2 | 14 |
| 3 | Norway | 4 | 2 | 0 | 2 | 98 | 109 | –11 | 2 | 10 |
| 4 | Finland | 4 | 1 | 0 | 3 | 92 | 144 | –52 | 2 | 6 |
| 5 | Estonia | 4 | 0 | 0 | 4 | 39 | 222 | –183 | 0 | 0 |
Points were awarded to the teams as follows: Win - 4 points Draw - 2 points Offensive Bonus Point is given for 3 more tries than the other team - 1 point Loss within 7 points - 1 point Loss greater than 7 points - 0 points

Matches

1 October 2016
14:00 EEST (UTC+03)

| Estonia | 5–53 | Hungary (1 BP) |

Kalevi Keskstaadion, Tallinn
Referee: Georgii Kopp (Russia)

8 October 2016
14:00 CEST (UTC+02)

| Norway | 48–31 | Finland |

Bislett Stadium, Oslo
Referee: Afonso Nogueira (Portugal)

8 October 2016
15:00 CEST (UTC+02)

| Hungary | 25–13 | Denmark |

RCH Stadion, Esztergom
Referee: Hrvoje Bartolic (Czech Republic)

22 October 2016
13:00 EEST (UTC+03)

| (1 BP) Finland | 51–6 | Estonia |

Myllypuro sports park, Helsinki
Referee: Ramunas Grumbinas (Lithuania)

22 October 2016
16:00 CEST (UTC+02)

| (1 BP) Denmark | 20–0 | Norway |

Odense Atletikstadion, Odense
Referee: Daniel Maughan (Germany)

22 April 2017
16:00 CEST (UTC+02)

| (1 BP) Denmark | 53–5 | Finland |
| | Report |

Odense Atletikstadion, Odense
Attendance: 450
Referee: Dariusz Reks (Poland)

22 April 2017
15:50 EEST (UTC+03)

| (1 BP) Hungary | 42–7 | Norway |
| | Report |

RCH Stadion, Esztergom
Attendance: 500
Referee: Lukasz Jasinski (Poland)

29 April 2017
14:00 EEST (UTC+03)

| Estonia | 12–75 | Denmark (1 BP) |
| | Report |

Kalevi Keskstaadion, Tallinn
Attendance: 50
Referee: George Mossford (Finland)

6 May 2017
13:00 EEST (UTC+03)

| Finland | 5–37 | Hungary (1 BP) |
| | Report |

Myllypuro sports park, Helsinki
Attendance: 400
Referee: Kevin Sulejmani (Belgium

6 May 2017
14:00 CEST (UTC+02)

| (1 BP) Norway | 43–16 | Estonia |
| | Report |

International School of Stavanger, Stavanger
Attendance: 500
Referee: Rami Aro (Sweden)

=== Round 1B: South ===
Advances to Round 1 Final

| Place | Nation | Games | | | | Points | | | Bonus points | Table points |
| Place | Nation | played | won | drawn | lost | for | against | diff | Bonus points | Table points |
|---|---|---|---|---|---|---|---|---|---|---|
| 1 | Bosnia and Herzegovina | 3 | 2 | 0 | 1 | 65 | 54 | +11 | 1 | 9 |
| 2 | Austria | 3 | 2 | 0 | 1 | 54 | 51 | +3 | 0 | 8 |
| 3 | Slovenia | 3 | 1 | 0 | 2 | 89 | 48 | +41 | 2 | 6 |
| 4 | Serbia | 3 | 1 | 0 | 2 | 52 | 107 | –55 | 0 | 4 |
Points were awarded to the teams as follows: Win - 4 points Draw - 2 points Offensive Bonus Point is given for 3 more tries than the other team - 1 point Loss within 7 points - 1 point Loss greater than 7 points - 0 points

Matches

8 October 2016
15:00 CEST (UTC+02)

| Austria | 29–22 | Bosnia and Herzegovina (1 BP) |

Hohe Warte Stadium, Vienna
Referee: Štepán Cekal (Czech Republic)

29 October 2016
14:00 CEST (UTC+02)

| (1 BP) Slovenia | 74–13 | Serbia |

ŽŠD Ljubljana Stadium, Ljubljana
Referee: Matteo Liperini (Italy)

8 April 2017
14:00 CEST (UTC+02)

| (1 BP) Slovenia | 15–22 | Bosnia and Herzegovina |
| | Report |

ŽŠD Ljubljana Stadium, Ljubljana
Attendance: 1,000
Referee: Norbert Mátrai (Hungary)

22 April 2017
17:00 CEST (UTC+02)

| Austria | 13–0 | Slovenia |
| | Report |

Hohe Warte Stadium, Vienna
Attendance: 800
Referee: Pedro Mendes Silva (Portugal)

22 April 2017
15:00 CEST (UTC+02)

| Bosnia and Herzegovina | 21–10 | Serbia |
| | Report |

Stadion Kamberovice Polje, Zenica
Attendance: 300
Referee: Csaba Priskin (Hungary)

29 April 2017
14:00 CEST (UTC+02)

| Serbia | 29–12 | Austria |
| | Report |

Rad Stadium, Belgrade
Attendance: 200
Referee: Shota Tevzadze (Georgia)

=== Round 1 Final ===
Hungary, as winners, qualify for round 3.

20 May 2017
16:00 EEST (UTC+03)

| Hungary | 19–17 | Bosnia and Herzegovina |
| | Report |

Franka Pálya, Esztergom
Attendance: 800
Referee: Andrea Spadoni (Italy)

== Round 2: Rugby Europe Conference 1 ==
=== Round 2A: North ===
Advances to Conference Final

| Place | Nation | Games | | | | Points | | | Bonus points | Table points |
| Place | Nation | played | won | drawn | lost | for | against | diff | Bonus points | Table points |
|---|---|---|---|---|---|---|---|---|---|---|
| 1 | Czech Republic | 4 | 4 | 0 | 0 | 158 | 26 | +132 | 3 | 19 |
| 2 | Lithuania | 4 | 3 | 0 | 1 | 93 | 47 | +46 | 2 | 14 |
| 3 | Latvia | 4 | 2 | 0 | 2 | 56 | 98 | –42 | 2 | 10 |
| 4 | Sweden | 4 | 1 | 0 | 3 | 56 | 124 | –68 | 1 | 5 |
| 5 | Luxembourg | 4 | 0 | 0 | 4 | 39 | 107 | –68 | 1 | 1 |
Points were awarded to the teams as follows: Win - 4 points Draw - 2 points Offensive Bonus Point is given for 3 more tries than the other team - 1 point Loss within 7 points - 1 point Loss greater than 7 points - 0 points

Matches

3 September 2016
15:00 CEST (UTC+02)

| Sweden | 14–56 | Czech Republic (1 BP) |
| | Report |

Enköpings Rugbyklubb, Enkoping
Attendance: 400
Referee: Maxime Burlet (Belgium)

22 October 2016
15:00 EEST (UTC+03)

| Latvia | 31–24 | Luxembourg (1 BP) |
| | Report |

Daugava Stadium, Riga
Attendance: 450
Referee: Tomáš Tuma (Czech Republic)

5 November 2016
15:00 EET (UTC+02)

| Lithuania | 11–6 | Latvia (1 BP) |
| | Report |

Darius and Girėnas Stadium, Kaunas
Attendance: 500
Referee: Arthur Kaptyukh (Russia)

5 November 2016
16:00 CET (UTC+01)

| Luxembourg | 0–19 | Sweden (1 BP) |
| | Report |

Stade Josy Barthel, Luxembourg City
Attendance: 1,200
Referee: Luca Trentin (Italy)

12 November 2016
14:00 CET (UTC+01)

| Czech Republic | 15–6 | Lithuania |
| | Report |

Stadion ragby Císařka, Prague
Attendance: 1,500
Referee: Shota Tevzadze (Georgia)

15 April 2017
14:00 CEST (UTC+02)

| (1 BP) Czech Republic | 54–3 | Latvia |
| | Report |

Stadion ragby Císařka, Prague
Attendance: 1,000
Referee: Gabriel Chirnoaga (Italy)

22 April 2017
15:00 EEST (UTC+03)

| (1 BP) Lithuania | 24–12 | Luxembourg |
| | Report |

Vingis Park Rugby Stadium, Vilnius
Attendance: 450
Referee: Mike Hawkins (Denmark)

29 April 2017
15:00 EEST (UTC+03)

| Latvia | 16–9 | Sweden (1 BP) |
| | Report |

Daugava Stadium, Riga
Attendance: 500
Referee: Sam Grove-White (Scotland)

6 May 2017
15:00 CEST (UTC+02)

| Sweden | 14–52 | Lithuania (1 BP) |
| | Report |

Enköpings Rugbyklubb, Enkoping
Attendance: 320
Referee: Killian O'Brien (Germany)

6 May 2017
16:00 CEST (UTC+02)

| Luxembourg | 3–33 | Czech Republic (1 BP) |
| | Report |

Stade Josy Barthel, Luxembourg City
Attendance: 1,200
Referee: Craig Maxwell-Keys (England)

=== Round 2B: South ===
Advances to Conference Final

| Place | Nation | Games | | | | Points | | | Bonus points | Table points |
| Place | Nation | played | won | drawn | lost | for | against | diff | Bonus points | Table points |
|---|---|---|---|---|---|---|---|---|---|---|
| 1 | Malta | 4 | 3 | 1 | 0 | 147 | 49 | +98 | 3 | 17 |
| 2 | Israel | 4 | 3 | 0 | 1 | 135 | 100 | +35 | 2 | 14 |
| 3 | Croatia | 4 | 2 | 1 | 1 | 106 | 79 | +27 | 3 | 13 |
| 4 | Andorra | 4 | 1 | 0 | 3 | 62 | 181 | –119 | 0 | 4 |
| 5 | Cyprus | 4 | 0 | 0 | 4 | 72 | 113 | –41 | 2 | 2 |
Points were awarded to the teams as follows: Win - 4 points Draw - 2 points Offensive Bonus Point is given for 3 more tries than the other team - 1 point Loss within 7 points - 1 point Loss greater than 7 points - 0 points

Matches

22 October 2016
18:00 CEST (UTC+02)

| Andorra | 15–63 | Malta (1 BP) |
| | Match centre |

Estadi Nacional, Andorra La Vella
Referee: Riccardo Angelucci (Italy)

29 October 2016
14:00 CEST (UTC+02)

| (1 BP) Malta | 31–3 | Cyprus |
| | Match centre |

Hibernians Stadium, Paola
Referee: Ariel Cabral (Israel)

29 October 2016
15:15 CEST (UTC+02)

| (1 BP) Croatia | 47–15 | Andorra |
| | Report |

Stadion Stari plac, Split
Attendance: 1,000
Referee: Ionut Bodea (Romania)

5 November 2016
14:00 IST (UTC+02)

| Israel | 23–16 | Croatia (1 BP) |
| | Report |

Wingate Institute, Netanya
Attendance: 1,700
Referee: John Catteau (Belgium)

12 November 2016
14:30 EET (UTC+02)

| Cyprus | 28–38 | Israel (1 BP) |
| | Report |

Pafiako Stadium, Paphos
Attendance: 500
Referee: Matéj Rázga (Czech Republic)

11 February 2017
18:00 CET (UTC+01)

| Andorra | 15–14 | Cyprus (1 BP) |
| | Report |

Estadi Nacional, Andorra La Vella
Attendance: 1,000
Referee: Philippe Lenne (Belgium)

8 April 2017
14:00 IST (UTC+02)

| (1 BP) Israel | 57–17 | Andorra |
| | Report |

Wingate Institute, Netanya
Attendance: 700
Referee: Yann Benoît (Switzerland)

22 April 2017
14:00 CET (UTC+01)

| (1 BP) Malta | 39–17 | Israel |
| | Match centre Report |

Hibernians Stadium, Paola
Attendance: 1,500
Referee: Pierre Brousset (France)

29 April 2017
14:00 CEST (UTC+02)

| Croatia | 14–14 | Malta |
| | Report |

Stadion NŠC Stjepan Spajić, Zagreb
Attendance: 1,500
Referee: Jorge Molpeceres (Spain)

6 May 2017
15:00 EEST (UTC+03)

| (1 BP) Cyprus | 27–29 | Croatia |
| | Report |

Pafiako Stadium, Paphos
Attendance: 500
Referee: Nigel Correll (Ireland)

=== Round 2 Final ===
The Czech Republic, as winners, qualify for round 3.

20 May 2017
14:00 CEST (UTC+02)

| Czech Republic | 48–14 | Malta |
| | Report |

Stadion Markéta, Prague
Attendance: 500
Referee: Thomas Charabas (France)

== Round 3 ==
The Czech Republic, as winners, qualify for the final of round 4.

27 May 2017
14:00 CEST (UTC+02)

| Czech Republic | 47–19 | Hungary |
| | Report |

Stadion ragby Císařka, Prague
Attendance: 500
Referee: François Bouzac (France)

== Round 4 ==
=== Round 4A: Rugby Europe Trophy ===
Advances to Round 4 Final

| Place | Nation | Games | | | | Points | | | Bonus points | Table points |
| Place | Nation | played | won | drawn | lost | for | against | diff | Bonus points | Table points |
|---|---|---|---|---|---|---|---|---|---|---|
| 1 | Portugal | 5 | 5 | 0 | 0 | 179 | 37 | +142 | 4 | 24 |
| 2 | Netherlands | 5 | 3 | 0 | 2 | 159 | 94 | +65 | 3 | 15 |
| 3 | Switzerland | 5 | 3 | 0 | 2 | 140 | 122 | +18 | 1 | 13 |
| 4 | Poland | 5 | 3 | 0 | 2 | 73 | 73 | 0 | 0 | 12 |
| 5 | Moldova | 5 | 1 | 0 | 4 | 100 | 162 | -62 | 3 | 7 |
| 6 | Ukraine | 5 | 0 | 0 | 5 | 52 | 215 | –163 | 0 | 0 |
Points were awarded to the teams as follows: Win - 4 points Draw - 2 points Offensive Bonus Point is given for 3 more tries than the other team - 1 point Loss within 7 points - 1 point Loss greater than 7 points - 0 points

Matches

24 September 2016
19:30 CEST (UTC+02)

| Poland | 22–0 | Ukraine |
| | Report |

Arena Lublin, Lublin
Attendance: 2,500
Referee: Dan Jones (Wales)

5 November 2016
14:00 EET (UTC+02)

| Ukraine | 12–54 | Netherlands (1 BP) |
| | Report |

Arena Lviv, Lviv
Attendance: 1,000
Referee: Paulo Duarte (Portugal)

12 November 2016
13:10 EET (UTC+02)

| (1 BP) Moldova | 54–15 | Ukraine |
| | Report |

Stadionul Central, Bălți
Attendance: 500
Referee: Laurent Cardona (France)

19 November 2016
15:00 CET (UTC+01)

| (1 BP) Netherlands | 44–17 | Moldova |
| | Report |

NRCA Stadium, Amsterdam
Attendance: 3,215
Referee: Sam Grove-White (Scotland)

19 November 2016
15:00 CET (UTC+01)

| Switzerland | 10–28 | Portugal |
| | Match centre |

Stade Municipal, Yverdon-les-Bains
Attendance: 2,057
Referee: Emanuele Tomo (Italy)

26 November 2016
15:00 CET (UTC+01)

| Switzerland | 29–26 | Moldova (1 BP) |
| | Report |

Stade Municipal, Yverdon-les-Bains
Attendance: 1,030
Referee: Frank Himmer (Germany)

18 February 2017
15:00 WET (UTC+00)

| (1 BP) Portugal | 35–10 | Poland |
| | Match centre |

CAR Rugby do Jamor, Lisbon
Attendance: 2,000
Referee: Sam Grove-White (Scotland)

4 March 2017
15:00 CET (UTC+01)

| Netherlands | 10–26 | Portugal (1 BP) |
| | Match centre |

NRCA Stadium, Amsterdam
Attendance: 3,500
Referee: Giuseppe Vivarini (Italy)

11 March 2017
15:00 WET (UTC+00)

| (1 BP) Portugal | 59–0 | Moldova |
| | Match centre |

CAR Rugby do Jamor, Lisbon
Attendance: 1,400
Referee: Stuart Gaffikin (Ireland)

12 March 2017
15:00 CET (UTC+01)

| (1 BP) Switzerland | 54–18 | Ukraine |
| | Report |

Centre Sportif des Cherpines, Geneva
Attendance: 2,000
Referee: Radu Petrescu (Romania)

18 March 2017
13:00 EET (UTC+02)

| Moldova | 3–15 | Poland |
| | Report |

Balti Stadium, Bălți
Attendance: 350
Referee: Alexei Bryzgalin (Russia)

18 March 2017
15:00 CET (UTC+01)

| Netherlands | 38–25 | Switzerland |
| | Report |

NRCA Stadium, Amsterdam
Attendance: 2,000
Referee: Iñigo Atorrasagasti (Spain)

1 April 2017
15:00 EEST (UTC+03)

| Ukraine | 7–31 | Portugal |
| | Report; Match centre |

Spartak Stadium, Odesa
Attendance: 4,000
Referee: Vlad Iordăchescu (Romania)

8 April 2017
18:00 CEST (UTC+02)

| Poland | 14–13 | Netherlands (1 BP) |
| | Report |

Stadion Widzewa, Łódź
Attendance: 400
Referee: Tual Trainini (France)

22 April 2017
17:00 CEST (UTC+02)

| Poland | 12–22 | Switzerland |
| | Report |

Stadion Polonii, Warsaw
Referee: Matthew Carley (England)

=== Round 4 Final ===
This fixture, unlike previous knock out fixtures, doubles as part of the Rugby Europe Trophy competition. Portugal, as winners, advance to round 6.

18 November 2017
15:00 WET (UTC+0)

| Portugal | 45–12 | Czech Republic |
| | Report |

Estádio Nacional, Oeiras
Attendance: 1,000
Referee: Christophe Ridley (England)

== Round 5 ==
=== Table ===
For the Rugby Europe Championship teams, results are considered on a 2-year aggregate from the 2017 and 2018 seasons (excluding matches involving Georgia, who had already qualified). The winner advanced to the Rugby World Cup and the runner-up advanced to the Round 6 play-off.

Qualified as Europe 1
Advances to Round 6

| Place | Nation | Games | | | | Points | | | Bonus points | Deductions | Total points |
| Place | Nation | played | won | drawn | lost | for | against | diff | Bonus points | Deductions | Total points |
|---|---|---|---|---|---|---|---|---|---|---|---|
| 1 | Russia | 8 | 4 | 0 | 4 | 226 | 144 | +82 | 4 | | 20 |
| 2 | Germany | 8 | 2 | 0 | 6 | 149 | 446 | –287 | 2 | | 10 |
| 3 | Romania | 8 | 6 | 0 | 2 | 296 | 126 | +170 | 6 | -30 | 0 |
| 4 | Spain | 8 | 6 | 0 | 2 | 217 | 85 | +132 | 2 | -40 | –14 |
| 5 | Belgium | 8 | 2 | 0 | 6 | 170 | 257 | –87 | 3 | -30 | –19 |
Points were awarded to the teams as follows: Win - 4 points Draw - 2 points Offensive Bonus Point is given for 3 more tries than the other team - 1 point Loss within 7 points - 1 point Loss greater than 7 points - 0 points

World Rugby received complaints against all five teams of fielding ineligible players, in breach of Regulation 8, during the qualification process. The neutral panel cleared Germany and Russia of the alleged ineligible players, but found Belgium, Romania and Spain guilty of breaching Regulation 8. The panel determined that each nation would be deducted 5 points for each game they had fielded an ineligible player, regardless of if more than one ineligible player had been fielded. The investigation found that Belgium and Romania had fielded ineligible players 6 times (a deduction of 30 points) and Spain 8 times (a deduction of 40 points) during the qualification process. This meant, with the deducted points for the respective nations, Russia would qualify ahead of Romania and Germany would advance to the play-offs ahead of Spain. On 29 May 2018, it was confirmed that both Romania and Spain had appealed the decision. On 6 June, the appeal failed and the decision was upheld meaning Russia was confirmed as Europe 1 and qualified for the World Cup, whilst Germany advanced to round 6.

=== Matches ===
2017 Matches

11 February 2017
13:15 CET (UTC+01)

| (1 BP) Germany | 41–38 | Romania (1 BP) |
| | Match centre |

Sparda Bank Hessen Stadium, Offenbach
Attendance: 3,000
Referee: Maxime Chalon (France)

11 February 2017
15:45 CET (UTC+01)

| Spain | 16–6 | Russia |
| | Match centre |

Estadio Nacional Complutense, Madrid
Attendance: 8,000
Referee: Dudley Phillips (Ireland)

18 February 2017
14:00 EET (UTC+02)

| Romania | 13–3 | Spain |
| | Report |

Stadionul Emil Alexandrescu, Iași
Referee: Elia Rizzo (Italy)

18 February 2017
15:00 CET (UTC+01)

| (1 BP) Belgium | 18–25 | Russia |
| | Match centre |

King Baudouin Stadium, Brussels
Attendance: 2,500
Referee: Salem Attalah (France)

4 March 2017
13:00 MSK (UTC+03)

| Russia | 10–30 | Romania (1 BP) |
| | Match centre |

Sochi Central Stadium, Sochi
Attendance: 2,000
Referee: Sean Gallagher (Ireland)

4 March 2017
16:15 CET (UTC+01)

| (1 BP) Germany | 34–29 | Belgium (1 BP) |
| | Match centre |

Sparda Bank Hessen Stadium, Offenbach
Attendance: 4,126
Referee: Iñigo Atorrasagasti (Spain)

11 March 2017
13:00 CET (UTC+01)

| Germany | 15–32 | Spain |
| | Match centre |

Sportpark Höhenberg, Cologne
Attendance: 4,500
Referee: Lloyd Linton (Scotland)

11 March 2017
15:00 CET (UTC+01)

| Belgium | 17–33 | Romania (1 BP) |
| | Match centre |

King Baudouin Stadium, Brussels
Attendance: 3,000
Referee: Claudio Blessano (Italy)

18 March 2017
15:00 CET (UTC+01)

| (1 BP) Spain | 30–0 | Belgium |
| | Match centre |

Estadio Nacional Complutense, Madrid
Attendance: 1,000
Referee: Vlad Iordăchescu (Romania)

19 March 2017
14:00 MSK (UTC+03)

| (1 BP) Russia | 52–25 | Germany |
| | Match centre |

Sochi Central Stadium, Sochi
Attendance: 2,500
Referee: Cédric Marchat (France)

As the bottom-placed team in the 2017 Championship, Belgium faced the 2016/17 Trophy champions Portugal in a promotion/relegation play-off. While the game did not effect Portugal's World Cup qualification chances, as they were still to compete in the round 4 final at the time, Belgium were competing to stay in the European Championship and therefore the qualifying tournament. On 20 May 2017, Belgium defeated Portugal to remain in contention.

20 May 2017
16:00 CEST (UTC+02)

| Belgium | 29–18 | Portugal |
| | Match centre |

King Baudouin Stadium, Brussels
Attendance: 1,820
Referee: Frank Murphy (Ireland)

2018 Matches

10 February 2018
15:00 MSK (UTC+03)

| (1 BP) Russia | 13–20 | Spain |
| | Report |

Kuban Stadium, Krasnodar
Attendance: 11,500
Referee: Frank Murphy (Ireland)

10 February 2018
16:00 EET (UTC+02)

| (1 BP) Romania | 85–6 | Germany |
| | Report |

Cluj Arena, Cluj
Attendance: 1,500
Referee: Maxime Burlet (Belgium)

17 February 2018
15:00 MSK (UTC+03)

| (1 BP) Russia | 48–7 | Belgium |
| | Report |

Kuban Stadium, Krasnodar
Attendance: 6,000
Referee: Iñigo Atorrasagasti (Spain)

18 February 2018
12:45 CET (UTC+01)

| Spain | 22–10 | Romania |
| | Report |

Estadio Nacional Complutense, Madrid
Attendance: 15,000
Referee: Thomas Charabas (France)

3 March 2018
16:00 CET (UTC+01)

| (1 BP) Belgium | 69–15 | Germany |
| | Report |

King Baudouin Stadium – Annex 2, Brussels
Attendance: 1,600
Referee: Sean Gallagher (Ireland)

3 March 2018
16:00 EET (UTC+02)

| (1 BP) Romania | 25–15 | Russia |
| | Report |

Cluj Arena, Cluj
Attendance: 2,000
Referee: Alexandre Ruiz (France)

10 March 2018
13:00 EET (UTC+02)

| (1 BP) Romania | 62–12 | Belgium |
| | Report |

Stadionul Municipal, Buzau
Attendance: 2,000
Referee: Sam Grove-White (Scotland)

11 March 2018
12:30 CET (UTC+01)

| (1 BP) Spain | 84–10 | Germany |
| | Report |

Estadio Nacional Complutense, Madrid
Attendance: 15,753
Referee: Marius Mitrea (Italy)

18 March 2018
13:00 CET (UTC+01)

| Germany | 3–57 | Russia (1 BP) |
| | Report |

Sportpark Höhenberg, Köln
Attendance: 2,600
Referee: Ian Tempest (England)

18 March 2018
13:00 CEST (UTC+02)

| Belgium | 18–10 | Spain |
| | Report |

King Baudouin Stadium – Annex 2, Brussels
Attendance: 3,000
Referee: Vlad Iordăchescu (Romania)

== Round 6: Final play-off ==
Germany, as winners, advance to the Europe/Oceania play-off.

16 June 2018
15:00 CEST (UTC+02)

| Germany | 16–13 | Portugal |
| Try: Els 51' c Con: Parkinson (1/1) 53'; Pen: Parkinson (3/3) 6', 64', 72' | Report | Try: Villax 48' c Con: Rodrigues (1/1) 49'; Pen: Rodrigues (2/2) 24', 29' |

Fritz-Grunebaum-Sportpark, Heidelberg
Attendance: 2,700
Referee: Tom Foley (England)

Team details

| FB | 15 | Pierre Mathurin | (substituted off) 40' |
| RW | 14 | Marcel Coetzee |
| OC | 13 | Mathieu Ducau |
| IC | 12 | Raynor Parkinson | (substituted off) 75' |
| LW | 11 | Maxime Oltmann |
| FH | 10 | Hagen Schulte | (substituted off) 50' |
| SH | 9 | Sean Armstrong |
| N8 | 8 | Jarrid Els | (substituted off) 70' |
| OF | 7 | Jaco Otto |
| BF | 6 | Ayron Schramm |
| RL | 5 | Sebastian Ferreira |
| LL | 4 | Eric Marks |
| TP | 3 | Samy Füchsel | (substituted off) 52' |
| HK | 2 | Mika Tyumenev | (substituted off) 47' |
| LP | 1 | Julius Nostadt (c) | (substituted off) 68' |
Replacements:
| HK | 16 | Mark Fairhurst | (substituted on) 47' |
| PR | 17 | Anthony Dickinson | (substituted on) 68' |
| PR | 18 | Jörn Schröder | (substituted on) 52' |
| LK | 19 | Marcel Henn | (substituted on) 70' |
| LK | 20 | Timo Vollenkemper | (substituted on) 19' |
| SH | 21 | Tim Menzel | (substituted on) 74' |
| FB | 22 | Nikolai Klewinghaus | (substituted on) 40' |
| FH | 23 | Chris Hilsenback | (substituted on) 50' |
Coach:
(Uruguay) Pablo Lemoine

| FB | 15 | Nuno Sousa Guedes |
| RW | 14 | Tomás Appleton |
| OC | 13 | Rodrigo Fruedenthal |
| IC | 12 | Vasco Ribeiro |
| LW | 11 | Adérito Esteves |
| FH | 10 | José Rodrigues |
| SH | 9 | Manuel Queirós |
| N8 | 8 | Jacques le Roux | (substituted off) 75' |
| OF | 7 | Sebastião Villax |
| BF | 6 | Salvador Vassalo Santos (c) |
| RL | 5 | Gonçalo Uva | (substituted off) 59' |
| LL | 4 | Jean Sousa |
| TP | 3 | Bruno Rocha | (substituted off) 53' |
| HK | 2 | Duarte Diniz |
| LP | 1 | Francisco Fernandes | (substituted off) 53' |
Replacements:
| PR | 16 | Bruno Medeiros | (substituted on) 53' |
| HK | 17 | Nuno Mascarenhas |
| LK | 18 | Geordie McSullea | (substituted on) 59' |
| N8 | 19 | Francisco Sousa | (substituted on) 75' |
| SH | 20 | Francisco Vieira |
| CE | 21 | Manuel Vilela Pereira |
| FB | 22 | Andreu Cyrille |
| PR | 23 | João Taveira | (substituted on) 53' |
Coach:
(Portugal) Martim Aguiar

Touch judges:
Ian Tempest (England)
Christophe Ridley (England)

Notes:

- Mark Fairhurst (Germany) and Jean Sousa and João Taveira (both Portugal) made their international debuts.

== See also ==
- 2016–17 Rugby Europe International Championships
- 2017–18 Rugby Europe International Championships
