= Oliech =

Oliech is a surname. Notable people with the surname include:

- Dennis Oliech (born 1985), Kenyan footballer
- Samuel Oliech (born 1993), Kenyan rugby sevens player
