= Dirk Kuhnen =

German rugby union player

- Born: Hanover, West Germany
- University: University of Göttingen
- Occupation: Orthopedic Surgeon

Rugby union career
- Position: Prop
Amateur team(s)
Years	Team	Apps	(Points)
1985-1989	TSV Victoria Linden		
1989	Windhoek Wanderers		
1990	University of Otago		
1991-1998	TSV Victoria Linden		
1999	DSV 78 Hannover		
Provincial / State sides
Years	Team	Apps	(Points)
1991	PublicSchool Wanderers XV		
International career
Years	Team	Apps	(Points)
1986-1990	West Germany	15	
1990-1997	Germany	25	

Dirk Kuhnen is a retired German rugby player, who played prop for the German national team from 1988 to 1998. He was the regular captain of Germany from 1995 to 1998.

Kuhnen was a member of German teams which toured Canada in 1988, competed in the erstwhile FIRA Tournaments and Rugby World Cup qualification matches. He also played for Germany in the Malaysia Tens.

He played club rugby for TSV Victoria Linden in Hanover, with whom he played in numerous German Championship finals, winning the Championship six times.

== Honours ==
=== Club ===
- German Championship 1987, 1989, 1992, 1993, 1994, 1996 (all with TSV Victoria Linden)
