= Torsten Schippe =

- Born: Torsten Schippe
- Occupation: Engineer

Rugby union career
- Position: Forward
Amateur team(s)
Years	Team	Apps	(Points)
- DSV 78 Hannover
- Correct as of 26 July 2010
International career
Years	Team	Apps	(Points)
	Germany	30	
- Correct as of 26 July 2010
Coaching career
- Years: Team
- 1993-2003: DRC Hannover
- 2000-2001: Germany
- 2010-2013: Germany

Torsten Schippe is a retired German international rugby union player and, from August 2010 to April 2013, the coach of the German national rugby union team.

As a player, Schippe won two German titles with his club, DSV 78 Hannover, in 1990 and 1991. He took over as coach of DRC Hannover in 1993, a position he held for ten years, in which he won five national championships and two national cups. He remained with DRC as the Director of Sports after his time as coach of the club. Since 2007, he is also an official IRB Coach Educator.

Schippe coached the German national team from 2000 to 2001 and again since 1 August 2010. In this position, he is supported by the South African Jakobus Potgieter as his assistant. He had succeeded Peter Ianusevici as German coach in 2000, after a disastrous campaign, and transformed the team to a winning side. However, he was dismissed in a surprise move by the leadership of the German Rugby Federation despite achieving good results. As coach of Germany, he succeeded Rudolf Finsterer, who, in turn, had succeeded him in 2001.

Schippe once more resigned from his post as coach of Germany in April 2013, citing work commitments as the reason.

== Honours ==
=== Player ===
- German rugby union championship
  - Champions: 1990, 1991
- German rugby union cup
  - Runners up: 1990

=== Coach ===
- German rugby union championship
  - Champions: 1998, 1999, 2000, 2001, 2002
  - Runners up: 2003
- German rugby union cup
  - Winners: 2002, 2003
  - Runners up: 1997
