= Bruno Stolorz =

German rugby union coach

- Born: Bruno Stolorz; 6 February 1955 (age 71)

Rugby union career
Coaching career
- Years: Team
- ????: RC Orléans
- 2008 - 2010: Germany

Bruno Stolorz (born 6 February 1955) is a former coach of the German national rugby union team.

Stolorz shared his duties as coach of Germany with Rudolf Finsterer until the latter's resignation on 20 March 2010. Stolorz was seconded to the German team by the Fédération française de rugby to improve Germany's performance in the sport and is also a coach with French club team RC Orléans, where he fulfills the position of a Conseiller sportif auprès. He took up his position with the German team in early 2008.

After the end of Germany's 2008-10 European Nations Cup campaign and Finsterer's resignation, the latter stated that Stolorz would be the ideal candidate to coach Germany by himself. However, Stolorz was replaced with Torsten Schippe in July 2010, with South African Jakobus Potgieter as Schippes assistant.

== Coaching honours ==
=== National team ===
- European Nations Cup - Division 2
  - Champions: 2008
