= Rudolf Finsterer =

Germany international rugby union player & coach

- Born: Rudolf Finsterer; 5 May 1951 (age 75)

Rugby union career
- Position: -
International career
Years	Team	Apps	(Points)
- Germany
- Correct as of 8 March 2010
Coaching career
- Years: Team
- 2002 - 2008: RG Heidelberg
- 2001 - 2010: Germany
- 2009 - 2011: RG Heidelberg
- Correct as of 8 March 2010

Rudolf Finsterer (born 5 May 1951) is a retired German international rugby union player and coach, formerly coaching the RG Heidelberg in the Rugby-Bundesliga and, until the 20 March 2010, the German national rugby union team.

Finsterer resigned from his position of coach of Germany at the end of the country's European Nation Cup campaign, after suffering defeat in every match and relegation. He was bitterly disappointed about the relegation, considering his ten years in the position of coach of Germany wasted. He was succeeded by Torsten Schippe as coach of Germany, the very man he himself succeeded in 2001.

Finsterer shared his duties as coach of Germany with Bruno Stolorz from the RC Orléans. Stolorz was seconded to the German team by the Fédération française de rugby to improve Germany's performance in the sport.

On club level, Finsterer coached the RG Heidelberg since 2002, with an interruption in the 2008-09 season. At the end of the 2010-11 season, he retired from coaching and instead stepped into the role of a team manager with RG Heidelberg.

Finsterer lives in Mannheim and, while coach of Germany, worked under the Bundestrainer Peter Ianusevici, who holds a position of director of rugby in Germany.

== Coaching honours ==
=== Club ===
- German rugby union championship
  - Champions: 2006, 2007
- German rugby union cup
  - Winner: 2004
  - Runners up: 2006, 2007, 2008

=== National team ===
- European Nations Cup - Division 2
  - Champions: 2008
