= Horst Kemmling =

German rugby union player

- Born: Horst Kemmling

Rugby union career
- Position: ?
Amateur team(s)
Years	Team	Apps	(Points)
- TSV Victoria Linden
- Correct as of 22 March 2010
International career
Years	Team	Apps	(Points)
1976 - 1994	Germany	50	
- Correct as of 21 March 2011

Horst Kemmling is a retired German international rugby union player, having played for the TSV Victoria Linden in the Rugby-Bundesliga and the German national rugby union team.

Kemmling was, until 27 October 2012, Germany's record rugby international, having played 50 internationals for his country between 1976 and 1994. With the opening game of Germany's 2012–14 campaign, Alexander Widiker played his 51st game for his country, thereby surpassing Kemmling's record.

Kemmling has also captained Germany for a lengthy period of time during that era. During his time at Viktoria Linden, he won five German championships with the club.

He was the captain of the German team that won promotion to the A-group of European rugby in 1981, something Germany did not achieve again until 2008.

He is now the chairman of his old club, TSV Victoria Linden.
