= 2019 Rugby World Cup – Asia qualification =

Qualifying for the 2019 Rugby World Cup for Asia Rugby began in May 2016 and ended in early June 2018, where the winner of the qualification process advanced to a cross-regional play-off series against the winner of Round 2 of the Oceania qualification process in June 2018.

== Format ==
The Asia Rugby Championship, governed by Asia Rugby, was the regional qualification tournament for Rugby World Cup 2019, with Divisions 2, 1 and the Top 3 being involved in the process. The teams that competed in the 2016 Divisions 1 and 2 acted as Round 1 qualifiers, with the winner of Division 2 being promoted to Division 1, for the second regional qualification round in 2017. While the teams that competed in Division 1, contested against each other to earn the right to remain in Division 1 for the second regional qualification round, with the team placed bottom being eliminated from Rugby World Cup contention.

2017 saw Division 1 act as the main qualification tournament, where the winner advanced to Round 3 joined Hong Kong and South Korea in the top flight division.

In 2018, the winner of the 2018 Asia Rugby Championship, Round 3, advanced to the cross-regional playoff series against Oceania 4 for a repechage berth.

== Entrants ==
Ten teams competed for the 2019 Rugby World Cup – Asian qualification; teams world rankings are prior to the first Asian qualification match on 8 May 2016 and bold nations denotes teams have previously played in a Rugby World Cup.

Nation	Rank	Began play	Qualifying status
Guam	73	18 May 2016	Eliminated by Thailand on 18 May 2016
Hong Kong	25	28 April 2018	Advances to Asia/Oceania play-off for repechage
Japan	10	N/A	Qualified as hosts of the World Cup
Kazakhstan	42	8 May 2016	Withdrew from World Cup contention on 10 April 2016
Malaysia	58	8 May 2016	Eliminated by South Korea on 19 May 2018
Philippines	54	8 May 2016	Eliminated by Malaysia on 17 May 2017
Singapore	59	8 May 2016	Eliminated by Malaysia on 14 May 2016
South Korea	26	28 April 2018	Eliminated by Hong Kong on 2 June 2018
Sri Lanka	38	8 May 2016	Eliminated by Malaysia on 20 May 2017
Thailand	76	18 May 2016	Eliminated by UAE on 21 May 2016
United Arab Emirates	83	18 May 2016	Eliminated by Sri Lanka on 17 May 2017
Uzbekistan	87	18 May 2016	Eliminated by UAE on 18 May 2016

== Round 1 ==
The first round consisted of ten matches between 8 teams. The winner of the Asian Rugby Championship Division 2 (Round 1A), United Arab Emirates, advanced to the second round and was promoted to division 1 for 2017, while the bottom placed team in division 1 (Round 1B), Singapore, was relegated and thus eliminated from Rugby World Cup contention.

On 10 April 2015, Kazakhstan who were meant to compete in the 2016 Asian Rugby Championship Division 1 (Round 1B) withdrew from the competition and Rugby World Cup contention. Singapore were therefore promoted up to Division 1 and Thailand replaced Singapore in Division 2.

=== Round 1A: 2016 Asian Rugby Championship Division 2 ===
The 2016 Asian Rugby Championship Division 2 tournament was contested by four teams in a knockout format. The tournament was held in Tashkent, Uzbekistan.

Semi-finals
18 May 2016 – Tashkent
Thailand	25
Guam	16
18 May 2016 – Tashkent
United Arab Emirates	65
Uzbekistan	13

Final
21 May 2016 – Tashkent
Thailand	18
United Arab Emirates	70
Third place play-off
21 May 2016 – Tashkent
Guam	23
Uzbekistan	22

Matches

18 May 2016
14:00

Thailand	25–16	Guam
	Match centre Report

Dustlik Stadium, Tashkent
Referee: Rui Shimizu (Japan)

18 May 2016
16:00

Uzbekistan	13–65	United Arab Emirates
	Match centre Report

Dustlik Stadium, Tashkent
Referee: Just Wang (Singapore)

21 May 2016
14:00

Guam	23–22	Uzbekistan
	Match centre Report

Dustlik Stadium, Tashkent
Referee: Rui Shimizu (Japan)

21 May 2016
16:00

Thailand	18–70	United Arab Emirates
	Match centre Report

Dustlik Stadium, Tashkent
Referee: Just Wang (Singapore)

=== Round 1B: 2016 Asian Rugby Championship Division 1 ===
The 2016 Asian Rugby Championship Division 1 tournament was contested by four teams in a round robin format. The tournament was held in Kuala Lumpur, Malaysia.

Eliminated from RWC qualification

Pos	Nation	Games				Points			Bonus points	Total points
Pos	Nation	Played	Won	Drawn	Lost	For	Against	Difference	Bonus points	Total points
1	Malaysia	3	2	0	1	92	52	+40	3	11
2	Sri Lanka	3	2	0	1	75	80	–5	1	9
3	Philippines	3	1	0	2	60	63	–3	3	7
4	Singapore	3	1	0	2	65	97	–32	0	4
Points were awarded to the teams as follows: Win - 4 points Draw - 3 points 4 or more tries - 1 point Loss within 7 points - 1 point Loss greater than 7 points - 0 points

Matches

8 May 2016
14:30

(1 BP) Sri Lanka	33–17	Singapore

Royal Selangor Stadium, Kuala Lumpur
Referee: Timothy Baker (Hong Kong)

8 May 2016
16:30

(1 BP) Malaysia	10–15	Philippines

Royal Selangor Stadium, Kuala Lumpur
Referee: Paul McKay (Singapore)

11 May 2016
14:30

(2 BP) Philippines	24–28	Singapore

Royal Selangor Stadium, Kuala Lumpur
Referee: Dewi Rowlands (Hong Kong)

11 May 2016
16:30

(1 BP) Malaysia	42–17	Sri Lanka

Royal Selangor Stadium, Kuala Lumpur
Referee: Timothy Baker (Hong Kong)

14 May 2016
14:30

Sri Lanka	25–21	Philippines (1 BP)

Royal Selangor Stadium, Kuala Lumpur
Referee: Paul McKay (Singapore)

14 May 2016
16:30

(1 BP) Malaysia	40–20	Singapore

Royal Selangor Stadium, Kuala Lumpur
Referee: Timothy Baker (Hong Kong)

== Round 2: 2017 Asian Rugby Championship Division 1 ==
The 2017 Asian Rugby Championship Division 1 tournament was held in Ipoh, Malaysia, in a round-robin format.

Advances to Round 3

Pos	Nation	Games				Points			Bonus points	Total points
Pos	Nation	Played	Won	Drawn	Lost	For	Against	Diff	Bonus points	Total points
1	Malaysia	3	3	0	0	98	39	+59	2	14
2	Sri Lanka	3	2	0	1	66	52	+14	1	9
3	Philippines	3	1	0	2	55	90	–35	0	5
4	United Arab Emirates	3	0	0	3	65	103	–38	0	0
Points were awarded to the teams as follows: Win - 4 points Draw - 3 points 4 or more tries - 1 point Loss within 7 points - 1 point Loss greater than 7 points - 0 points

Matches

14 May 2017
14:00

Sri Lanka	24–13	Philippines

Ipoh Padang, Ipoh
Referee: Lawrence Wilkinson (Hong Kong)

14 May 2017
16:00

(1 BP) Malaysia	36–22	United Arab Emirates

Ipoh Padang, Ipoh
Referee: Just Wang (Singapore)

17 May 2017
14:00

(1 BP) Sri Lanka	33–17	United Arab Emirates

Ipoh Padang, Ipoh
Referee: Charlie Brown (Singapore)

17 May 2017
16:00

(1 BP) Malaysia	40–8	Philippines

Ipoh Padang, Ipoh
Referee: Taku Otsuki (Japan)

20 May 2017
14:00

Philippines	34–26	United Arab Emirates

Ipoh Padang, Ipoh
Referee: Lawrence Wilkinson (Hong Kong)

20 May 2017
16:00

Malaysia	22–9	Sri Lanka

Ipoh Padang, Ipoh
Referee: Taku Otsuki (Japan)

== Round 3: 2018 Asia Rugby Championship ==
As the winner of this round, Hong Kong advances to a Cross-regional play-off series against Oceania 4, Cook Islands to earn a berth in the Repechage tournament.

Advances to Cross-regional play-off series

Pos	Nation	Games				Points			Bonus points	Total points
Pos	Nation	Played	Won	Drawn	Lost	For	Against	Diff	Bonus points	Total points
1	Hong Kong	4	4	0	0	227	44	+183	3	19
2	South Korea	4	2	0	2	128	91	+37	2	10
3	Malaysia	4	0	0	4	40	260	–220	0	0
Points were awarded to the teams as follows: Win - 4 points Draw - 2 points 4 or more tries - 1 point Loss within 7 points - 1 point Loss greater than 7 points - 0 points

Matches

28 April 2018
16:30

Malaysia	10–35	South Korea (1 BP)

National Stadium, Kuala Lumpur
Attendance: 11,500
Referee: Timothy Baker (Hong Kong)

5 May 2018
16:30

Malaysia	8–67	Hong Kong (1 BP)

National Stadium, Kuala Lumpur
Referee: Shuhei Kubo (Japan)

12 May 2018
16:30

South Korea	21–30	Hong Kong

Namdong Asiad Rugby Stadium, Incheon
Referee: Shuhei Kubo (Japan)

19 May 2018
16:30

(1 BP) South Korea	67–12	Malaysia

Namdong Asiad Rugby Stadium, Incheon
Referee: Stephen Copeman (Hong Kong)

26 May 2018
16:00

(1 BP) Hong Kong	91–10	Malaysia

Hong Kong Football Club Stadium, Hong Kong
Referee: Shuhei Kubo (Japan)

2 June 2018
16:00

(1 BP) Hong Kong	39–5	South Korea

Hong Kong Football Club Stadium, Hong Kong
Referee: Shuhei Kubo (Japan)
