= 2019 Rugby World Cup – Africa qualification =

International rugby union competition Africa

Tournament details
- Dates: 12 June 2016 – 18 August 2018
- No. of nations: 14

Qualifying for the 2019 Rugby World Cup for Africa Rugby began in June 2016, with 14 teams competing. On 18 August 2018, Namibia qualified for the World Cup by winning the 2018 Rugby Africa Gold Cup, defeating Kenya, who finished second and advanced to the repechage tournament.

== Format ==
The Africa Cup, controlled by Rugby Africa (CAR), will be the regional qualification tournament for Rugby World Cup 2019.

The first qualifying round was the 2016 1B and 1C Divisions. The winner of Division 1C was promoted to 1B and the second round of qualifying, while the team placed bottom in 1B was relegated and eliminated from Rugby World Cup contention.

Similarly, 2017 saw Divisions 1A (Gold Cup) and 1B (Silver Cup) act as Round 2. The winner of the 2017 Silver Cup advanced to the Gold Cup for 2018 and remain in contention, while the loser of the 2017 Gold Cup was relegated to the 2018 Silver Cup and eliminated from Rugby World Cup contention.

In Round 3, the winners of the 2018 Gold Cup will qualify for the World Cup as 'Africa 1', while the runner-up, 'Africa 2' will advance to the Repechage tournament as the African representative.

== Entrants ==
Fourteen teams competed for the 2019 Rugby World Cup – African qualification; teams world rankings are prior to the first African qualification match on 12 June 2016 and bold nations denotes teams have previously played in a Rugby World Cup.

Nation	Rank	Begins play	Qualifying status
Botswana	64	26 June 2016	Eliminated by Ivory Coast on 5 July 2017
Cameroon	91	5 June 2016	Withdrew from World Cup contention in June 2016
Ivory Coast	51	29 June 2016	Eliminated by Morocco on 8 July 2017
Kenya	27	24 June 2017	Advanced to the Repechage as Africa 2
Madagascar	41	12 June 2016	Eliminated by Morocco on 5 July 2017
Mauritius	86	10 July 2016	Eliminated by Nigeria on 13 July 2016
Morocco	54	10 July 2016	Eliminated by Kenya's victory on 11 August 2018
Namibia	21	1 July 2017	Qualified by defeating Kenya on 18 August 2018
Nigeria	77	13 July 2016	Eliminated by Morocco on 16 July 2016
Senegal	50	15 June 2016	Eliminated by Tunisia on 5 August 2017
South Africa	3	N/A	Qualified with Top 12 finish at 2015 World Cup
Tunisia	38	26 June 2016	Eliminated by Kenya 11 August 2018
Uganda	49	24 June 2017	Eliminated by Kenya's victory on 11 August 2018
Zambia	83	12 June 2016	Eliminated by Senegal on 15 June 2016
Zimbabwe	31	24 June 2017	Eliminated by Namibia on 4 August 2018

== Round 1 ==
The first round consisted of ten matches between 10 teams. The winner of the Africa Cup Division 1C, Morocco, advanced to the second round and was promoted to division 1B for 2017, while the two winners of division 1B, Senegal and Tunisia, advanced to division 1A.

=== Round 1A: 2016 Africa Cup Division 1B ===
Africa Cup Division 1B was contested by six teams, in a two-group round-robin tournament. Pool 1 was held in Monastir, Tunisia, while Pool 2 was held in Antananarivo, Madagascar. The team with the worst record was relegated to Division 1C in 2017, and thus eliminated from qualification.

==== Pool A ====
Advances to Round 2, Div 1A
Advances to Round 2, Div 1B

Place	Nation	Games				Points			Bonus points	Table points
Place	Nation	played	won	drawn	lost	for	against	difference	Bonus points	Table points
1	Senegal	2	2	0	0	84	27	+57	1	9
2	Madagascar	2	1	0	1	48	45	+3	1	5
3	Zambia	2	0	0	2	18	78	−60	0	0
Points were awarded to the teams as follows: Win – 4 points Draw – 2 points 4 or more tries – 1 point Loss within 7 points – 1 point Loss greater than 7 points – 0 points

Matches

12 June 2016
15:00

Madagascar	24–15	Zambia
	Match centre

Stade Mahamasina, Antananarivo, Madagascar
Referee: Gauthier 0zoux (Mauritius)

15 June 2016
15:00

Zambia	3–54	Senegal (1 BP)
	Match centre

Stade Mahamasina, Antananarivo, Madagascar
Referee: Gauthier 0zoux (Mauritius)

19 June 2016
15:00

(1 BP) Madagascar	24–30	Senegal
	Match centre

Stade Mahamasina, Antananarivo, Madagascar
Referee: Lourens van der Merwe (South Africa)

==== Pool B ====
Advances to Round 2, Div 1A
Advances to Round 2, Div 1B

Place	Nation	Games				Points			Bonus points	Table points
Place	Nation	played	won	drawn	lost	for	against	difference	Bonus points	Table points
1	Tunisia	2	2	0	0	93	15	+78	2	10
2	Ivory Coast	2	1	0	1	25	63	−38	0	4
3	Botswana	2	0	0	2	23	63	−40	1	1
Points were awarded to the teams as follows: Win – 4 points Draw – 2 points 4 or more tries – 1 point Loss within 7 points – 1 point Loss greater than 7 points – 0 points

Matches

26 June 2016
16:00

(1 BP) Tunisia	43–10	Botswana
	Match centre Report

Ben Jannet stadium, Monastir, Tunisia
Attendance: 1,000
Referee: Sylvain Mane (Senegal)

29 June 2016
16:00

(1 BP) Botswana	13–20	Ivory Coast
	Match centre Report

Ben Jannet stadium, Monastir, Tunisia
Attendance: 800
Referee: Constant Cap (Kenya)

2 July 2016
22:00

(1 BP) Tunisia	50–5	Ivory Coast
	Match centre Report

Ben Jannet stadium, Monastir, Tunisia
Attendance: 3,000
Referee: Vivien Praderie (France)

==== Final ====
The two pool winners contested the final, with both teams advancing to the 2017 Africa Gold Cup.

12 November 2016
15:00

Senegal	15–14	Tunisia
	Report

Ben Jannet stadium, Monastir, Tunisia
Attendance: 5,000
Referee: Constant Cap (Kenya)

=== Round 1B: 2016 Africa Cup Division 1C ===
Africa Cup Division 1C was contested by three teams in a round-robin tournament. Cameroon were meant to compete but withdrew from the tournament after it was rescheduled for a later date. The tournament was held in Casablanca, Morocco.

Advances to Round 2, Div 1B

Place	Nation	Games				Points			Bonus points	Table points
Place	Nation	played	won	drawn	lost	for	against	difference	Bonus points	Table points
1	Morocco	2	2	0	0	121	13	+108	2	10
2	Nigeria	2	1	0	1	41	74	−33	1	5
3	Mauritius	2	0	0	2	24	99	−75	0	0
Points were awarded to the teams as follows: Win – 4 points Draw – 2 points 4 or more tries – 1 point Loss within 7 points – 1 point Loss greater than 7 points – 0 points

Matches

10 July 2016
17:00

Mauritius	3–68	Morocco (1 BP)
	Match centre Report

COC stadium, Casablanca, Morocco
Attendance: 1,700
Referee: Salem Attalah (France)

13 July 2016
17:00

(1 BP) Nigeria	31–21	Mauritius
	Match centre Report

COC stadium, Casablanca, Morocco
Attendance: 1,000
Referee: Akram Garchi (Tunisia)

16 July 2016
17:00

(1 BP) Morocco	53–10	Nigeria
	Match centre Report

COC stadium, Casablanca, Morocco
Attendance: 2,500
Referee: Bahroun Haykel (Tunisia)

== Round 2 ==
The second round will see the five highest finishers of the six teams in the Gold Cup, Kenya, Namibia, Tunisia, Uganda and Zimbabwe, progress to the 2018 Gold Cup, with the last place side, Senegal, relegated to the Silver Division and eliminated from World Cup qualification. The Winner of Silver Cup, Morocco, was the first team to earn their place in the 2018 Gold Cup.

=== Round 2A: 2017 Africa Gold Cup ===
Advances to Round 3

Place	Nation	Games				Points			Bonus points	Table points
Place	Nation	played	won	drawn	lost	for	against	diff	Bonus points	Table points
1	Namibia	5	5	0	0	272	64	+208	5	25
2	Kenya	5	3	1	1	226	135	+91	4	18
3	Uganda	5	3	1	1	190	126	+64	2	16
4	Tunisia	5	2	0	3	91	272	−181	0	8
5	Zimbabwe	5	1	0	4	111	157	−46	2	6
6	Senegal	5	0	0	5	75	211	−136	1	1
Points were awarded to the teams as follows: Win – 4 points Draw – 2 points 4 or more tries – 1 point Loss within 7 points – 1 point Loss greater than 7 points – 0 points

Matches

24 June 2017
17:00

(1 BP) Kenya	33–33	Uganda
	Report

RFUEA Ground, Nairobi
Referee: Laurent Cardona (France)

24 June 2017
16:00

Senegal	16–28	Zimbabwe (1 BP)
	Report

Stade Iba Mar Diop, Dakar
Attendance: 1,500
Referee: Thomas Charabas (France)

1 July 2017
16:00

(1 BP) Senegal	16–17	Uganda
	Report

Stade Iba Mar Diop, Dakar
Attendance: 3,500
Referee: Sébastien Minery (France)

1 July 2017
19:00

Tunisia	7–53	Namibia (1 BP)
	Report

Ben Jannet Stadium, Monastir
Attendance: 1,500
Referee: Cédric Marchat (France)

8 July 2017
15:00

(1 BP) Kenya	100–10	Tunisia
	Report

RFUEA Ground, Nairobi
Attendance: 4,100
Referee: Tual Trainini (France)

8 July 2017
15:00

(1 BP) Namibia	95–0	Senegal
	Report

Hage Geingob Rugby Stadium, Windhoek
Attendance: 1,000
Referee: Egon Seconds (South Africa)

15 July 2017
13:00

(1 BP) Kenya	45–25	Senegal
	Report

RFUEA Ground, Nairobi
Attendance: 2,000
Referee: Thomas Charabas (France)

15 July 2017
15:00

(1 BP) Uganda	78–17	Tunisia

Kyadondo Rugby Club, Kampala
Referee: Lesego Legoete (South Africa)

15 July 2017
15:00

(1 BP) Namibia	31–26	Zimbabwe (1 BP)
	Report

Hage Geingob Rugby Stadium, Windhoek
Attendance: 2,000
Referee: Quinton Immelman (South Africa)

22 July 2017
14:00

Uganda	24–48	Namibia (1 BP)
	Report

Kyadondo Rugby Club, Kampala
Referee: Jaco van Heerden (South Africa)

22 July 2017
15:00

Zimbabwe	22–41	Kenya (1 BP)
	Report

Hartsfield Rugby Ground, Bulawayo
Attendance: 2,500
Referee: Lesego Legoete (South Africa)

29 July 2017
15:00

Zimbabwe	23–31	Tunisia
	Report

Police Grounds, Harare
Referee: Jaco van Heerden (South Africa)

29 July 2017
15:00

(1 BP) Namibia	45–7	Kenya
	Report

Hage Geingob Rugby Stadium, Windhoek
Attendance: 4,500
Referee: Egon Seconds (South Africa)

5 August 2017
16:00

(1 BP) Uganda	38–12	Zimbabwe
	Report

Kyadondo Rugby Club, Kampala
Attendance: 5,000
Referee: Jaco van Heerden (South Africa)

5 August 2017
17:00

Tunisia	26–18	Senegal
	Report

Ben Jannet Stadium, Monastir
Attendance: 2,500
Referee: Adrien Descottes (France)

=== Round 2B: 2017 Africa Silver Cup ===
The 2017 Africa Silver Cup was contested by four teams in a knockout format. The tournament was held in Casablanca, Morocco.

Semi-finals
5 July 2017 – Casablanca
Ivory Coast	58
Botswana	25
5 July 2017 – Casablanca
Morocco	57
Madagascar	33

Final
8 July 2017 – Casablanca
Morocco	8
Ivory Coast	3
Third place play-off
8 July 2017 – Casablanca
Botswana	24
Madagascar	47

Matches

5 July 2017
16:00

Ivory Coast	58–25	Botswana
	Report

COC stadium, Casablanca, Morocco
Attendance: 800
Referee: Ludovic Cayre (France)

5 July 2017
18:00

Morocco	57–33	Madagascar
	Report

COC stadium, Casablanca, Morocco
Attendance: 1,000
Referee: Cedric Clave (France)

8 July 2017
15:30

Botswana	24–47	Madagascar
	Report

COC stadium, Casablanca, Morocco
Attendance: 600
Referee: Cedric Clave (France)

8 July 2017
17:30

Morocco	8–3	Ivory Coast
	Report

COC stadium, Casablanca, Morocco
Attendance: 1,000
Referee: Ludovic Cayre (France)

== Round 3: 2018 Africa Gold Cup ==
Six teams will contest the 2018 Rugby Africa Gold Cup and the final round of the African qualification, with the winner qualifying as Africa 1. The second placed team, Africa 2, will advance to the repechage tournament.

Qualifies as Africa 1
Advances to Repechage

Place	Nation	Games				Points			Bonus points	Table points
Place	Nation	played	won	drawn	lost	for	against	diff	Bonus points	Table points
1	Namibia	5	5	0	0	347	69	+278	5	25
2	Kenya	5	4	0	1	206	135	+71	1	17
3	Uganda	5	2	0	3	160	172	−12	1	9
4	Tunisia	5	2	0	3	66	279	−213	1	9
5	Zimbabwe	5	1	1	3	139	162	−23	2	8
6	Morocco	5	0	1	4	96	197	−101	1	3
Points were awarded to the teams as follows: Win – 4 points Draw – 2 points 3 or more tries than the opponent – 1 point Loss within 7 points – 1 point Loss greater than 7 points – 0 points

Matches

16 June 2018
13:00

Zimbabwe	23–23	Morocco
	Report

Police Grounds, Harare
Attendance: 5,000
Referee: Quinton Immelman (South Africa)

16 June 2018
15:30

(1 BP) Namibia	55–6	Uganda
	Report

Hage Geingob Rugby Stadium, Windhoek
Attendance: 3,000
Referee: Cwengile Jadezweni (South Africa)

23 June 2018
16:00

(1 BP) Namibia	118–0	Tunisia
	Report

Hage Geingob Rugby Stadium, Windhoek
Attendance: 2,000
Referee: Quinton Immelman (South Africa)

23 June 2018
18:00

(1 BP) Morocco	24–28	Kenya
	Report

COC stadium, Casablanca
Attendance: 800
Referee: Sébastien Minery (France)

30 June 2018
14:00

Kenya	45–36	Zimbabwe
	Report

RFUEA Ground, Nairobi
Attendance: 5,000
Referee: Tual Trainini (France)

30 June 2018
17:00

Morocco	7–63	Namibia (1 BP)
	Report

COC stadium, Casablanca
Attendance: 600
Referee: Adrien Descottes (France)

7 July 2018
14:00

Kenya	38–22	Uganda
	Report

RFUEA Ground, Nairobi
Attendance: 3,200
Referee: Quinton Immelman (South Africa)

7 July 2018
17:00

Tunisia	18–14	Zimbabwe (1 BP)
	Report

Boujemaa El-Kemiti stadium, Béja
Attendance: 2,000
Referee: Jonathan Dufort (France)

4 August 2018
14:00

(1 BP) Uganda	67–12	Tunisia
	Report

Kyadondo Rugby Club, Kampala
Attendance: 4,000
Referee: Rasta Rasivhenge (South Africa)

4 August 2018
16:00

Zimbabwe	28–58	Namibia (1 BP)
	Report

Police Grounds, Harare
Attendance: 3,500
Referee: Egon Seconds (South Africa)

11 August 2018
14:00

(1 BP) Kenya	67–0	Tunisia
	Report

RFUEA Ground, Nairobi
Attendance: 7,000
Referee: Julien Castaignede (France)

11 August 2018
16:00

Uganda	47–29	Morocco
	Report

Kyadondo Rugby Club, Kampala
Attendance: 2,000
Referee: Rasta Rasivhenge (South Africa)

18 August 2018
14:00

Uganda	18–38	Zimbabwe (1 BP)
	Report

Kyadondo Rugby Club, Kampala
Attendance: 3,000
Referee: Cwengile Jadezweni (South Africa)

18 August 2018
16:00

(1 BP) Namibia	53–28	Kenya
	Report

Hage Geingob Rugby Stadium, Windhoek
Attendance: 5,000
Referee: Egon Seconds (South Africa)

18 August 2018
18:00

(1 BP) Tunisia	36–13	Morocco
	Report

Jemmal Stadium, Jemmal
Attendance: 2,000
Referee: Thomas Charabas (France)
