= Julius Nostadt =

Rugby union player

- Full name: Julius Nostadt
- Born: 12 October 1992 (age 34) Heidelberg, Germany
- Height: 185 cm (6 ft 1 in)
- Weight: 116 kg (256 lb; 18 st 4 lb)

Rugby union career
- Position: Loose-head Prop
- Current team: Provence
Youth career
- 20??-2008: TSV Handschuhsheim
- 2008-2013: US Colomiers
- 2013-2014: Lyon OU
Senior career
Years	Team	Apps	(Points)
2014-2017	SO Chambéry	28	(0)
2017-2020	Aurillac	45	(5)
2020-2022	Castres Olympique	21	(0)
2022-	Provence	21	(0)
- Correct as of 5 October 2023
International career
Years	Team	Apps	(Points)
2013-2019	Germany	29	(10)
- Correct as of 5 October 2023

Julius Nostadt (born 12 October 1992) is a German rugby union player who plays for Provence in the Pro D2.

== Career ==
He began his career at TSV Handschusheim, before joining Colomiers academy and later the Lyon espoirs. He joined SO Chambéry in 2014 where he spent three years where he won the league title as well as coming runners up. He joined Pro D2 where he spent three years at Aurillac. In 2020 he made the jump and spent two seasons with Castres in the Top 14. He later joined Provence.

He made his international debut in 2013 coming off the bench in a 8–27 win over Czechia.
