= 2019 Rugby World Cup – Oceania qualification =

Qualifying for the 2019 Rugby World Cup for Oceania Rugby began in June 2016, where across 2 years, 3 teams competed for two direct qualification spots from Oceania. Two places were available to Oceania in a cross-regional play-off series' to qualify for the World Cup and or advance through the Repechage.

Two teams from the Oceania region, New Zealand and Australia, qualified automatically for the 2019 World Cup by finishing in the top 12 in the 2015 World Cup. Fiji and Tonga qualified by finishing first and second (on aggregate) in the 2016 and 2017 Pacific Nations Cup competitions. Samoa advanced to the cross regional play-off where they would play a team from Europe for a place in the World Cup; the loser would move to the Repechage. Tahiti won the 2017 Oceania Rugby Cup to advance to the second cross regional play-off, but were disqualified in March 2018 after a World Rugby investigation found they had fielded two ineligible players in their match against the Cook Islands. The Cook Islands were then declared winner of the Oceania Rugby Cup and will advance to the regional playoff to play a team from Asia for a place in the Repechage.

== Format ==
In addition to the two automatically qualified teams (Australia and New Zealand), Oceania had been allocated two further direct berths in the tournament. A third and fourth team from Oceania could join the tournament through cross-regional play-offs and the repechage.

The first round saw the leading three Pacific Nations; Fiji, Samoa and Tonga compete for the two direct qualification spots as Oceania 1 and 2. The three teams played each other home and away across two years, using the revamped World Rugby Pacific Nations Cup in 2016 and 2017 as the regional tournament. The top two teams gained qualification for Rugby World Cup 2019 as Oceania 1 and Oceania 2.

The third-placed team then advanced to a home and away Cross-Regional play-off series against the winners of round 6 in the European regional qualifiers, Europe 2.

Round 2, saw the lower ranked teams in the Pacific region compete for the 2017 Oceania Rugby Cup title, where the winner progressed to a home and away Cross-Regional play-off series against the winner of round 3 in the Asian regional qualifiers, Asia 1. The winner of that series will qualify for a position in the Repechage tournament.

== Entrants ==
Five teams competed for the 2019 Rugby World Cup – Oceania qualification; teams world rankings are prior to the first European qualification match on 11 June 2016 and bold nations denotes teams have previously played in a Rugby World Cup.

Nation	Rank (19 June 2016)	Began play	Qualifying status
Australia	2	N/A	Qualified with Top 12 finish at 2015 World Cup
Cook Islands	44	4 August 2017	Advances to Asia/Oceania play-off for repechage
Fiji	11	11 June 2016	Qualified by beating Tonga on 8 July 2017
New Zealand	1	N/A	Qualified with Top 12 finish at 2015 World Cup
Samoa	15	18 June 2016	Advances to Europe/Oceania play-off
Tahiti	93	4 August 2017	Disqualified for fielding ineligible players
Tonga	13	11 June 2016	Qualified after Fiji beat Samoa on 15 July 2017

== Round 1: Pacific Nations cup 2016–2017 ==
Qualifies for RWC
Advances to Europe/Oceania play-off

Rank	Team	Games				Points			Tries		Bonus Points	Table Points
Rank	Team	Played	Won	Drawn	Lost	For	Against	Diff	For	Against	Bonus Points	Table Points
1	Fiji	4	4	0	0	101	60	+41	11	5	1	17
2	Tonga	4	1	0	3	68	93	–25	7	9	2	6
3	Samoa	4	1	0	3	88	104	–16	5	8	1	5
Points breakdown: *4 points for a win *2 points for a draw *1 bonus point for a loss by seven points or less *1 bonus point for scoring four or more tries in a match

Matches

11 June 2016
15:00 FJT (UTC+12)

Fiji	23–18	Tonga (1 BP)
	Match centre Report

ANZ National Stadium, Suva
Attendance: 2,000
Referee: Nigel Owens (Wales)

18 June 2016
15:00 FJT (UTC+12)

Fiji	26–16	Samoa
	Match centre Report

ANZ National Stadium, Suva
Attendance: 2,063
Referee: George Clancy (Ireland)

25 June 2016
15:00 WST (UTC+13)

Samoa	30–10	Tonga
	Match centre Report

Apia Park, Apia
Attendance: 5,500
Referee: Pascal Gaüzère (France)

1 July 2017
15:00 TOT (UTC+13)

Tonga	30–26	Samoa (1 BP)
	Match centre Report

Teufaiva Sport Stadium, Nukuʻalofa
Attendance: 10,000
Referee: Marius Mitrea (Italy)

8 July 2017
15:00 TOT (UTC+13)

(1 BP) Tonga	10–14	Fiji
	Match centre Report

Teufaiva Sport Stadium, Nukuʻalofa
Attendance: 10,000
Referee: Nick Briant (New Zealand)

15 July 2017
14:00 WST (UTC+13)

Samoa	16–38	Fiji (1 BP)
	Match centre Report

Apia Park, Apia
Attendance: 6,500
Referee: Paul Williams (New Zealand)

== Round 2: 2017 Oceania Rugby Cup ==
The Cook Islands, as winners, advance to the Asia/Oceania play-off for repechage.

4 August 2017
15:00 CKT (UTC-10)

Cook Islands	Match awarded to Cook Islands; 9–13	Tahiti

Cook Islands National Stadium, Avarua
Referee: Alan Aiolupotea (Samoa)

Despite Tahiti winning the match on 5 August 2017, the result was overturned on 23 March 2018, and Tahiti were ejected from qualifying after being found to have breached player eligibility regulations in the Oceania Cup clash. Cook Islands therefore progressed.
