= Peter Ianusevici =

Romania international rugby union player & coach

- Born: 17 May 1950 (age 76) Sibiu, Romania

Rugby union career
- Position: Wing
Senior career
Years	Team	Apps	(Points)
- CSM Sibiu
–	Știința Cluj		
–	RCJ Farul Constanța		
–	Sportul Studențesc		
–	CSU Agronomia București		
International career
Years	Team	Apps	(Points)
1974–1978	Romania	15	(0)
- Romania
- 1991–1992: CSȘ 2 Constanța
- 1992–2002: Germany
- 2002–2012: Germany (Director of rugby)
- 2012–13: Romania (Director of rugby)
- 2014–: TSV Handschuhsheim (Director of rugby)

Peter Ianusevici (Romanian: Petre Ianusevici; born 17 May 1950 in Sibiu) is a retired Romanian rugby union international and former coach of the Romanian and the German national rugby union team.

Ianusevici played for CSM Sibiu, Știința Cluj, RCJ Farul Constanța, Sportul Studențesc and CSU Agronomia București. He represented Romania internationally in the 1970s, as a winger, playing 15 times for his country. Ianusevici then led his country as a coach to a Rugby World Cup appearance in 1991. He served as coach of the German team from October 1992 to 2002.

He held the position of Germany's director of rugby and the title Bundestrainer until 31 August 2012.

On 11 June 2012, he was appointed as sports director of the Romania national rugby union team. He declared that his contract with Romania was until 2015 and that he could imagine to return to Germany after that to take up an unpaid position within the German Rugby Federation. In August 2013 he resigned from his position with the Romanian Federation.

In April 2014, first division Rugby club TSV Handschuhsheim announced Peter Ianusevici as their new Director of Rugby. While his focus may be on coaching the first team, he will also oversee all Rugby-related operations in the club (e.g. coaching development, youth concepts, etc.).

== See also ==
- List of Romania national rugby union players
