= Sebastian Ferreira =

South African rugby player (born 1994)

- Full name: Sebastian Roche Ferreira
- Born: 10 February 1994 (age 32) Cape Town, South Africa
- Height: 1.95 m (6 ft 5 in)
- Weight: 112 kg (247 lb; 17 st 9 lb)
- School: Paarl Boys' High School
- University: University of South Africa

Rugby union career
- Position: Lock / Flanker
- Current team: Nottingham
Youth career
- 2010–2014: Western Province
- 2015–2016: Newcastle Falcons
Senior career
Years	Team	Apps	(Points)
2014	Saracens (trial)	1	(0)
2015	Hamiltons	7	(10)
2015-2016	Darlington Mowden Park	14	(10)
2016	Eastern Province Kings	7	(0)
2016-2018	Heidelberger RK		
2018-2020	Chambéry	32	(10)
2020-2023	CR São Miguel		
2023-	Nottingham	16	(0)
- Correct as of 5 April 2024
International career
Years	Team	Apps	(Points)
2016-	Germany	26	(20)
- Correct as of 5 April 2024

Sebastian Roche Ferreira (born 10 February 1994) is a South African-born international rugby union player for Germany. Ferreira plays club rugby for Nottingham in the RFU Championship. His regular position is lock or flanker.

== Club rugby ==
=== 2010–2014: Western Province ===
Ferreira was born in Cape Town and started playing rugby at primary school level, aged 10. He attended Paarl Boys' High School, where he was first selected to represent local provincial union Western Province at the Under-16 Grant Khomo Week in 2010. He scored tries in victories over the Lions and Blue Bulls in the tournament and was chosen to represent Western Province in the Under-18 Craven Week tournaments in both 2011 and 2012. In 2012, he was also called into the Western Province U19 squad that played in the Under-19 Provincial Championship, making several appearances as a replacement. This included appearances in the semi-final, where Western Province beat the Golden Lions 24–14, and the final, where Ferreira helped his team become champions with a 22–18 victory over the Blue Bulls, an experience that he described in 2015 as the "best moment of his career".

He returned in 2013 as the side attempted to retain their title; he started eight of their matches and scored a try against the Golden Lions, but his team had a disappointing season, finishing in fifth position to miss out on the title play-offs.

Ferreira progressed to Under-21 level in 2014 and started in four of their matches in the Under-21 Provincial Championship. The team finished top of the log and eventually reached the final, where they were beaten by the Blue Bulls, but Ferreira didn't feature in the latter stages of the competition.

=== 2014–2015: England / Hamiltons ===
After the 2014 season, Ferreira went to England to have trials with English Premiership. He was named on the Saracens bench for their match against Ospreys in the 2014–15 LV Cup and played several trial matches for the Newcastle Falcons in the Aviva A League. These proved to be successful and he was awarded academy contract for the 2015–16 season.

At the start of 2015, he played club rugby for Hamiltons in the 2015 SARU Community Cup. He started in all seven of their matches in the competition, scoring tries against Sishen in their first match of the competition and Despatch in their final match, the third-place play-off, which Hamiltons won 66–40 to secure third position in the competition.

=== 2015–2016: Newcastle Falcons / Darlington Mowden Park ===
He then returned to England to take up his academy contract with the Newcastle Falcons, also signing a dual registration with fellow North East side Darlington Mowden Park, playing in National League 1. He made fourteen appearances for the team during the 2015–16 season, scoring tries in matches against Ampthill and Cinderford.

He remained with Darlington Mowden Park throughout his time in England and never made an appearance for the Newcastle Falcons at senior level.

=== 2016: Eastern Province Kings ===
Ferreira returned to South Africa to join the Eastern Province Kings for the duration of the 2016 Currie Cup Premier Division. He was named in the starting line-up for their first match in the competition against the Boland Cavaliers.

== International rugby ==
=== 2016–present: Germany ===
Ferreira is eligible to represent Germany by virtue of having a German mother. In October 2016, he was included in the Germany squad for their 2016 autumn internationals and made his international debut by coming on as a replacement in their 24–21 victory over Uruguay.
