= Germany national rugby union team =

Team representing Germany in men's international rugby competitions

Germany
- Nickname: Schwarze Adler (Black Eagles)
- Emblem: Bundesadler (Federal Eagle)
- Union: Deutscher Rugby-Verband
- Head coach: Michael Poppmeier
- Captain: Justin Renc
- Most caps: Alexander Widiker (59)
- Top scorer: Raynor Parkinson (323)
- Top try scorer: Jaco Otto (23)
First colours	Second colours

World Rugby ranking
- Current: 34 (as of 21 July 2025)
- Highest: 22 (2017)
- Lowest: 37 (2011)

First international
- France 30−5 Germany (17 April 1927)

Biggest win
- Germany 108−0 Serbia and Montenegro (12 November 2005)

Biggest defeat
- Russia 89−6 Germany (16 April 2000)

World Cup
- Appearances: 0
- Website: www.rugby-verband.de

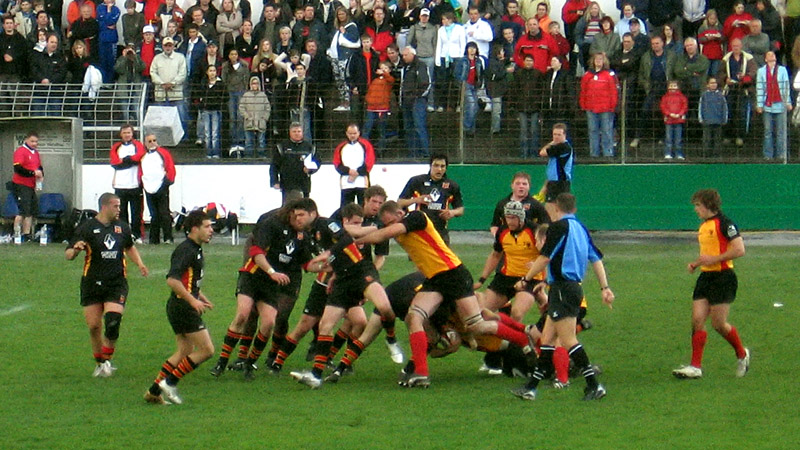
Germany playing Belgium in qualifiers for the 2007 Rugby World Cup

The Germany national rugby union team currently plays at the second level of European rugby but is yet to qualify for the Rugby World Cup. The national team first played in 1927, with rugby union in Germany being administered by the German Rugby Federation (Deutscher Rugby-Verband).

Germany competes in the Trophy Division, the second tier of the Rugby Europe International Championships, the senior men's rugby tournament for European nations below the Six Nations.

Germany's greatest achievement in men's rugby is arguably the silver medal won at the 1900 Olympic Games.

Germany's declared aim was originally to qualify for the 2015 Rugby World Cup in England, but then lowered this ambition to the 2019 Rugby World Cup in Japan, for which it also failed to qualify. The national side is ranked 30th in the world (as of 26 April 2021).

== History ==
=== Beginnings ===
German rugby crest

The German rugby union team's history began on 17 April 1927, when they played France in Paris, losing 5–30. The team established itself in their early years as number two in continental Europe, behind the French. They played 14 tests against their neighbour before the Second World War, winning two of them. As an indication of the team's strength, they did not lose to any team but France until 1937, when Italy beat them 9–7. Because Germany never played any of the Home nations, it is difficult to judge the true strength of the team from that era.

With the outbreak of the war in 1939, rugby came to a halt and Germany only played one more game, against Italy, in 1940. Germany lost almost a complete first XV in the war, and thus came out of it as a much weaker side, never able to repeat its pre-war successes.

=== Post-Second World War ===
After an absence of 12 years, Germany, now considerably reduced in size and under the name of Federal Republic of Germany, played its first post-war international in 1952, beating Belgium 16–9. At the same time, in the Eastern part of the country, the German Democratic Republic, the German Democratic Republic national rugby union team was formed. The DRV continued to offer the East German DTSB to play a rugby friendly, but this was always declined by the East.

Until 1965, Germany played friendlies only as there was no European rugby competition it could take part in.

The team also made an appearance at England's home ground, Twickenham Stadium, in 1956, losing 8–26 to Harlequin F.C. on 8 September of that year.

From 1965, it became part of the second tier of FIRA rugby, effectively the third tier of European rugby, the Five nations tournament being outside the FIRA structure. In 1975, it played its first international against a non-European nation, beating Morocco in Hannover.

The team's greatest success in the second half of the 20th century was promotion to the A group of FIRA rugby in 1981. From 1981 to 1983, Germany played ten games at this level, but won just one and were relegated back to the B level. After this, the team dropped briefly to the C level in 1985 but promptly returned to the second tier.

=== German reunification ===
With the German reunification, in 1991, the German Democratic Republic national rugby union team was dissolved and became part of the Federal Republic's team. In 1994, Horst Kemmling, Germany's long-standing captain, ended his international career, having played a record number of 50 games for Germany from 1976 onwards.

With the reorganisation of the European Nations Cup (ENC) in 2000, Germany became part of the second division.

=== Centenary and Barbarians tour ===
In 2000 the German Rugby Federation celebrated its centenary. Centenary celebrations included a banquet in the Heidelberg Castle and the hosting of the European leg of the Rugby World Cup Sevens in Heidelberg, in which the German team came close to upsetting Ireland, who had Gordon D'Arcy in their line-up. The tournament was won by the Welsh team, which featured Andy Marinos and Arwel Thomas.

The highlight of the Centenary season was the Centenary Match against the famous Barbarians. The Barbarians included a host of internationals including Scott Hastings, Peter Stringer, Shaun Longstaff, Jeff Probyn, Frankie Sheahan, Russell Earnshaw, Shaun Connor, John Langford and Derwyn Jones and won 47-19 against a determined German team.

Germany remained in the second division of the European Nations Cup until 2008, when it achieved promotion to the top level, facing Europe's number 7 to 11 teams in 2009 and 2010. Its declared aim at this level was to avoid relegation; qualification for the 2011 Rugby World Cup was not really expected from the team.

With over 8,000 spectators, Germany's home game against the Netherlands in Hanover, at the Rudolf-Kalweit-Stadion in April 2007, achieved the best crowd figures for a rugby match in Germany since the pre-Second World War days.

Germany was unbeaten at home from 12 November 2000, when it lost to Ukraine, until 8 November 2008, when it lost to a Welsh selection.

=== ENC 2008–10 ===
In March 2009, coach Mark Kuhlmann stepped down after three and a half years in office, while the other two coaches Rudolf Finsterer and Bruno Stolorz, remained in the job. Stolorz was seconded to the German team by the Fédération française de rugby to improve Germany's performance in the sport.

After five losses in the European Nations Cup in 2009, Germany achieved a win in a friendly against Hong Kong late in the year. Germany also managed a 15–12 victory over Switzerland but, as the German team had only one regular player in its side, captain Kehoma Brenner, the team was referred to as Germany A. Mustafa Güngör became Germany's new captain on 8 December 2009, after the retirement of the previous captain Jens Schmidt, and played his first game in this role four days later, against Hong Kong. Germany fielded eight uncapped players in this game. A planned game against the British Forces in Germany in January 2010 had to be called off twice because of bad weather.

Despite disappointing results on the field and the distinct possibility of Germany being relegated, the sport made some progress in the country in 2009–10. With the admittance of sevens rugby to the Olympic Games, rugby in Germany is now eligible for federal grants. Additionally, the Bundeswehr, the German army, has agreed to admit eight to ten players per year to its sports program, making those players effectively professionals.

In October 2009, the DRV decided to set its aim at playing two friendlies every year in November at home and two in January abroad. It also plans to organise a 10-day tour in Europe every year from 2013.

After disappointing results against Georgia, Portugal and Romania in spring 2010, the team's performance improved against Russia. In its final ENC game against Spain, where a victory by eleven points was needed, Germany played their best game in the campaign yet but nevertheless lost and was relegated. As a consequence, coach Rudolf Finsterer resigned after ten years of service. He was replaced by Torsten Schippe in July 2010, with South African Jakobus Potgieter as Schippes assistant.

=== ENC 2010–12 ===
Germany suffered a defeat in its opening game of the 2010–2012 European Nations Cup First Division B, losing to Poland 17–22 after leading 17–9 at half time. The defeat was seen as unnecessary by the President of the German Rugby Federation, Claus-Peter Bach, but he also considered Poland's victory as deserved. Germany went into the match with a new coach and assistant, a new captain, Alexander Widiker and five uncapped players.

Germany finally achieved its first win in the ENC since 26 April 2008, when it beat the Netherlands in Amsterdam on 27 November 2010. Its last victory in the European competition had come at the same place against the same opposition, just over 31-month earlier.

After a disappointing first half of the campaign, where Germany only won one of its five games, the team improved and won three in the second half, consequently finishing fourth overall out of six teams. With the final game against Moldova, Germany's captain Alexander Widiker played his 50th game for his country, thereby equaling Horst Kemmling's record.

=== ENC 2012–14 ===
Germany again competed in the European Nations Cup First Division B in 2012–2014, once more facing Poland, Moldova and the Czech Republic. Additionally, it also competed against Ukraine, relegated from the A group, and Sweden, promoted from the Second Division. Germany's first match was on 27 October when it played Ukraine at home. Before that the team played an unofficial warm up match against the New Zealand Ambassador's XV on 13 October 2012, a team that featured former All Black Keith Lowen in its ranks, and ended in a 22–20 victory for Germany.

Germany won its opening match against Ukraine 46–28, a game in which captain Alexander Widiker became the country's record international rugby union player with 51 games. After a loss to Poland, Germany finished 2012 with a win over Moldova. The German team lost a warm up match to a Welsh student selection in February 2013 before winning its first competitive match in 2013, against Czech Republic, 27-8. Germany finished the first phase of the campaign with a 73-17 victory over Sweden.

Germany's coach Torsten Schippe resigned from his post in April 2013, citing work commitments as the reason, despite achieving good results with his team.

Schippe was replaced by his assistant Kobus Potgieter as coach of the German team. Germany started the autumn of 2013 with two wins in friendlies against the B team of the Czech Republic and the New Zealand Ambassador's XV, the later with former All Black captain Taine Randell in its ranks. It then won its away match against Ukraine before winning at home against Poland, thereby taking back the lead in its division. Germany lost its last game of 2013, 15–30 to Moldova, but won comfortably 76–12 against the Czech Republic in April 2014. This game was to be the 58th and last for German captain and record international Alexander Widiker as he retired from international rugby after that.

Germany's last game of the 2012–14 campaign was against Sweden on 26 April where a bonus point win would guarantee the side the championship, promotion and an advancement in the Rugby World Cup qualifying. Germany won the game 45–20 to advance to a play-off game against the Netherlands in the 2015 Rugby World Cup – Europe qualification, which they won 17-7. They played Russia for a chance to qualify for the Repechage and lead 20–17 up to the 77th minute but eventually lost 20–31 and were knocked out of the qualifying.

=== ENC 2014–16 ===
Germany played two warm up matches in 2014. Germany played a match against the New Zealand Ambassadors XV which it won 21–19. Germany then lost to Namibia 58–20.

Germany is competing in the European Nations Cup First Division 1A in 2014–16. It is facing Georgia, Portugal, Romania, Russia and Spain in this competition, the same opponents it faced at its last stint at this level when it lost all ten games and was relegated. Germany began its ENC campaign in February 2015 with an 8–64 loss against Georgia. It also lost the following four games against Russia, Portugal, Romania and Spain. Germany thereby ended the first half of the 2014–16 campaign in sixth and last place with just one point out of five games, a bonus point earned against Rumania.

Germany played two friendlies against Brazil, on 28 November in Blumenau, and 4 December in São Paulo as warm-up matches for the upcoming European Nations Cup games. In the first-ever game against a South American opponent Germany won 29–12 and thereby climbed to 27th spot in the world ranking. After losing the first two games of the 2016 campaign Germany defeated Portugal 50–27 in Hanover in front of over 8,000 spectators. After losing to Romania Germany drew their final game of the campaign, against Spain, thereby finishing in fifth place, above Portugal, and avoiding relegation.

=== Europe International Championships 2016–17 ===
Germany played in the 2016–17 Championship Division of the Europe International Championships.

== Competitions ==
The performance of the German team since introduction of the European Nations Cup in 2000.

=== European Nations Cup / Europe International Championships ===
Years	Division	W–L (Pts Diff)	Position	Promotion / Relegation
2000	Second Division		5th	—
2001	Second Division		3rd	—
2002–2004	Second Division	5–2 (+102)	2nd	—
2006–2008	Second Division	6–2 (+67)	1st	Promoted
2008–2010	First Division	0–10 (−409)	6th	Relegated
2010–2012	Division 1B	4–6 (+17)	4th	—
2012–2014	Division 1B	8–2 (+218)	1st	Promoted
2014–2016	Division 1A	1–8 (−234)	5th	—
2017	Championship Division	2–3 (−80)	5th	—
2018	Championship Division	0–5 (−325)	3rd (Romania, Belgium and Spain deducted points)	—
2019	Championship Division	0–5 (−115)	6th	Relegated
2020	Trophy Division	1–2–2 (−23)	4th	—

=== Rugby World Cup qualifying ===
Years	Division	Position
2001–2002	2003 Rugby World Cup — Europe qualification – Round 2 – Pool A	2nd
2004–2006	2007 Rugby World Cup — Europe qualification – Round 3 – Play-off	Lost to Spain 28–42 on aggregate.
2008–2010	2011 Rugby World Cup — Europe qualification — ENC Division 1	6th/6th in ENC.
2012–2014	2015 Rugby World Cup — Europe qualification — Round 6	Lost to Russia 20–31.
2017–2018	2019 Rugby World Cup – play-off qualifications	Finished 2nd at repechage tournament

== Match results ==
=== Notable wins ===
The following table shows all German wins during the Rugby World Cup era (1987–present) against teams that have played in a Rugby World Cup.

Match date	Opponent	Result	Match
13 May 2006	Spain	18–6	2007 Rugby World Cup — Europe qualification – Round 3 – Play-off
27 February 2016	Portugal	50–27	European Nations Cup
12 November 2016	Uruguay	24–21	Autumn International
11 February 2017	Romania	41–38	Rugby Europe Championship
16 June 2018	Portugal	16-13	2019 Rugby World Cup – Europe qualification

== Record ==
=== Overall ===
Results listed includes games that was played as West Germany. See East Germany for results recorded by East Germany.

Until the separation of Germany to East and West, Germany had a winning record of 51.35%, winning 19 matches in 37 games between 1900 and 1940. As West Germany, they recorded a 40% win rate, winning 62 matches in 155 games from 1952 and 1990. As a united Germany, from 1900 until present day, Germany has won 151 of their 333 representative matches.

Below is a table of the representative rugby matches played by a Germany national XV at test level up until 14 November 2026, updated after match with Denmark.

Opponent	Played	Won	Lost	Drawn	Win %	For	Aga	Diff
Andorra	1	1	0	0	100%	56	11	+45
Austria	1	1	0	0	100%	69	9	+60
Belgium	35	22	12	1	62.86%	801	553	+248
Bulgaria	1	1	0	0	100%	40	12	+28
Brazil	5	5	0	0	100%	157	51	+106
British Army	1	1	0	0	100%	26	9	+17
Canada	1	0	1	0	0%	10	29	-19
Chile	1	0	1	0	0%	10	32	−22
Croatia	3	1	1	1	33.33%	50	67	−17
Czech Republic	9	7	2	0	77.78%	254	138	+116
Czechoslovakia	15	5	9	1	33.33%	176	223	−47
Denmark	10	9	1	0	88.89%	281	118	+163
France	15	2	13	0	13.33%	89	298	−209
France XV	29	0	28	1	0%	177	822	−645
Georgia	11	0	11	0	0%	81	549	−468
Hong Kong	4	2	2	0	50%	66	52	+14
Italy	20	4	15	1	20%	123	253	−130
Kenya	2	2	0	0	100%	73	35	+28
Latvia	2	2	0	0	100%	71	5	+66
Lithuania	3	3	0	0	100%	131	28	+103
Luxembourg	2	2	0	0	100%	150	7	+143
Malta	2	1	1	0	50%	72	37	+35
Moldova	7	4	3	0	57.14%	187	128	+59
Morocco	10	3	7	0	30%	97	163	-66
Namibia	3	0	3	0	0%	40	191	-151
Netherlands	50	27	22	1	54%	862	828	+34
Poland	21	11	10	0	52.38%	352	335	+17
Portugal	14	5	9	0	38.46%	234	437	−193
Romania	23	7	16	0	30.43%	277	676	−399
Russia	11	0	11	0	0%	145	533	−388
Samoa	3	0	3	0	0%	52	162	−110
Serbia and Montenegro	7	6	0	1	85.71%	232	26	+206
Soviet Union	5	1	4	0	20%	53	161	−108
Spain	27	8	17	2	29.63%	309	615	−306
Sweden	10	7	3	0	70%	276	135	+141
Switzerland	11	7	3	1	63.64%	305	216	+89
Tunisia	4	2	2	0	50%	58	53	+5
Ukraine	8	5	2	1	62.5%	170	131	+39
United States	1	0	1	0	0%	17	46	−29
Uruguay	1	1	0	0	100%	24	21	+3
Wales Dev. XV	1	0	1	0	0.00%	14	27	−13
Total	390	165	214	11	42.31%	6,413	7,936	−1,423

== Squad ==
German 23-player squad for their match against UK Armed Forces in November 2024, and in preparation for their test match against United Arab Emirates

Head Coaches: (Germany) Mark Kuhlmann

- Caps Updated: 23 October 2024 (as per squad announcement)

Player	Position	Date of birth (age)	Caps	Club/province
Rewi Pomare	Hooker		0	(Germany) Heidelberger TV
Andrew Reintges	Hooker	22 May 1998 (age 28)	12	(Germany) Heidelberger RK
Marcus Bachofer	Prop	16 April 1989 (age 37)	6	(Germany) Heidelberger RK
Christophe Edene	Prop	14 December 2001 (age 24)	6	(Germany) SC 1880 Frankfurt
Jörn Schröder (c)	Prop	8 November 1992 (age 34)	40	(Germany) Heidelberger RK
Daniel Wolf	Prop	6 April 2000 (age 26)	12	(Germany) SC 1880 Frankfurt
Luis Ball	Lock	16 May 1999 (age 27)	3	(Scotland) Watsonian
Robert Lehmann	Lock		4	(Germany) SC Neuenheim
Hassan Rayan	Lock	24 August 1994 (age 32)	12	(Germany) SC 1880 Frankfurt
Giovanni Habel-Küffner	Back row	9 January 1995 (age 31)	0	(France) Bayonne
Shawn Ingle	Back row	19 October 1998 (age 28)	2	(England) Blackheath
Justin Renc	Back row	2 February 2000 (age 26)	12	(Germany) TSV Handschuhsheim
Oliver Stein	Back row	7 January 2001 (age 25)	5	(Germany) SC 1880 Frankfurt
Nicolas Hoyer	Scrum-half		0	(Czech Republic) RC Tatra Smíchov
Niklas Bechtel	Fly-half	22 September 2003 (age 23)	0	(Germany) TSV Handschuhsheim
Bader Pretorius	Fly-half	16 May 1997 (age 29)	0	(Portugal) São Miguel
Robin Plümpe	Centre		1	(Germany) RG Heidelberg
Leo Wolf	Centre	16 May 2001 (age 25)	12	(Germany) SC 1880 Frankfurt
Nikolai Klewinghaus	Wing	16 March 1998 (age 28)	11	(Germany) SC Neuenheim
Felix Lammers	Wing	29 November 1996 (age 29)	15	(Germany) SC Neuenheim
Alexander Brosowski	Fullback		0	(Germany) DSV 78 Hannover
Jan Piosik	Fullback	20 November 1998 (age 27)	6	(Germany) DSV 78 Hannover

== Rankings ==
Men's World Rugby Rankings Top 30 as of 9 November 2026
Rank	Change (Note: Change from the previous week)	Team	Points
1	Steady	South Africa	93.09
2	Steady	New Zealand	92.65
3	Steady	Ireland	88.70
4	Steady	France	87.49
5	Steady	England	86.99
6	Steady	Scotland	84.40
7	Steady	Australia	83.12
8	Steady	Argentina	81.62
9	Steady	Fiji	77.79
10	Steady	Wales	77.37
11	Steady	Italy	76.30
12	Steady	Japan	75.25
13	Steady	Georgia	73.94
14	Steady	Portugal	70.52
15	Steady	United States	67.80
16	▲1	Spain	67.73
17	▲2	Tonga	65.87
18	▼2	Chile	65.81
19	▲1	Samoa	65.31
20	▼2	Uruguay	64.86
21	▲1	Canada	62.29
22	▲1	Belgium	62.00
23	▼2	Romania	61.72
24	Steady	Hong Kong	59.55
25	Steady	Zimbabwe	58.02
26	Steady	Netherlands	56.44
27	Steady	Namibia	56.03
28	Steady	Switzerland	55.47
29	Steady	Czech Republic	55.42
30	Steady	Poland	54.54

Source: World Rugby
Graph updated to 2 November 2026

== Captains ==
The following players have captained Germany in the recent past:

Captain	Years
Horst Kemmling	–1994
Dirk Kuhnen	1995–1998
Mark Schulze	1998–1999
Mark Kuhlmann	1999–2003
Colin Grzanna	2007–2008
Jens Schmidt	2006–2009
Mustafa Güngör	2009–2010
Alexander Widiker	2011–2014
Sean Armstrong	2014–
Clemens von Grumbkow	2015
Michael Poppmeier	2016–2018
Sebastian Ferreira	2019
Jörn Schröder	2019-2025
Justin Renc	2026-

== Coaches ==
The following coaches have led Germany in the recent past:

Coach	Years
(Germany) Helmut Flügge	1959–1969
(Germany) Klaus Wesch	1969–1981
(Germany) Fritz Raupers	1981–1988
(France) Robert Antonin	1988–1990
(France) Jean-Claude Rutault	1990–1992
(Romania) Petre Ianusevici	1992–2000
(Germany) Torsten Schippe	2000–2001
(Germany) Rudolf Finsterer	2001–2010
(France) Bruno Stolorz	2008-2010
(Germany) Torsten Schippe	2010–2013
(South Africa) Kobus Potgieter	2013–2017
(Uruguay) Pablo Lemoine	2018
(England) Mike Ford	2018–2019
(Germany) Mark Kuhlmann (interim)	2019
(South Africa) Byron Schmidt and Melvine Smith	2020
(Germany) Mark Kuhlmann	2020–2026
(South Africa) Michael Poppmeier	2026-

== Silver medal team 1900 ==
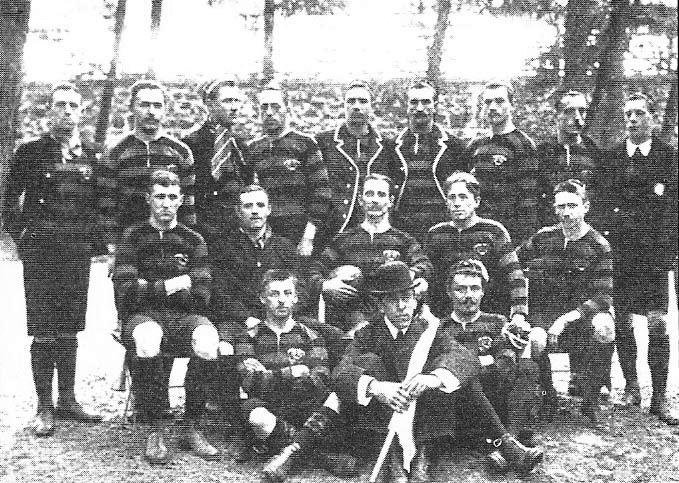
Germany, represented by SC 1880 Frankfurt, at the 1900 Summer Olympics

The following players were part of the team that won the silver medal at the 1900 Summer Olympics:

- Albert Amrhein
- Hugo Betting
- Jacob Herrmann
- Willy Hofmeister
- Hermann Kreuzer
- Arnold Landvoigt
- Hans Latscha
- Erich Ludwig
- Richard Ludwig
- Fritz Müller
- Eduard Poppe
- Heinrich Reitz
- August Schmierer
- Adolf Stockhausen
- Georg Wenderoth
