= Samuel Oliech =

Kenyan rugby union player

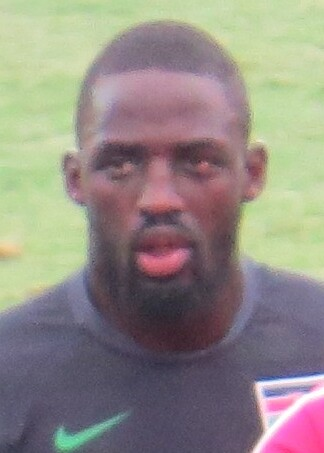
- Born: 15 December 1993 (age 32) Nairobi, Kenya
- Height: 1.85 m (6 ft 1 in)
- Weight: 92 kg (203 lb)

Rugby union career
National sevens team
| Years | Team | Comps |
- Kenya 7s

Samuel Oliech (born 15 December 1993) is a Kenyan rugby sevens player. He competed for Kenya 7s at the 2016 Summer Olympics. He was also part of the victorious team that won the 2016 Singapore Sevens. He competed for Kenya at the 2022 Rugby World Cup Sevens in Cape Town.
