= Raynor Parkinson =

Germany international rugby union player (born 1988)

- Born: 8 June 1988 (age 38) South Africa
- Height: 1.85 m (6 ft 1 in)
- Weight: 92 kg (14 st 7 lb; 203 lb)
- School: King Edward VII School (KES)

Rugby union career
- Position: Fly-half
- Current team: SC 1880 Frankfurt
Senior career
| Years | Team | Apps | (Points) |
- University of Johannesburg
| – | Golden Lions Academy | | |
| – | Blackheath F.C. | | |
| – | Old Elthamians | | |
| – | RC Hilversum | | |
| – | Heidelberger RK | | |
| – | SC 1880 Frankfurt | | |
| – | RC Narbonne | | |
- Correct as of 11 March 2017
International career
| Years | Team | Apps | (Points) |
| 2011-2024 | Germany | 44 | (407) |

Raynor Parkinson (born in Pretoria) is a South African born German rugby union player currently playing as a fly half for SC 1880 Frankfurt in the German Bundesliga.

He retired from international competition in 2024 as Germany's all-time leading scorer.
