= 2008–09 Rugby-Bundesliga squads =

The following players were on the roster of the nine Rugby-Bundesliga clubs for 2008-09

== Clubs ==
=== Berliner Rugby Club ===
Berliner RC team kit

Note: Flags indicate national union under World Rugby eligibility rules. Players may hold more than one non-World Rugby nationality.

Player	Position	Union
Viktor Feidt	Hooker	Germany
Gonzalo Liza Vidaurre	Hooker	Germany
Krystian Trochowski	Prop	Germany
Alexander von der Marwitz	Prop	Germany
Boris Siebenhörl	Prop	Germany
Carlos Duarte	Lock	Germany
Taisir Ighnaimat	Lock	Germany
Damian Konkolewski	Lock	Germany
Maximilian Rohwerder	Lock	Germany
Colin van Look	Lock	Germany
Gerrit van Look	Flanker	Germany
Eugen Feidt	Flanker	Germany
Ermanno Mattera	Flanker	Germany
Elenio Mattera	Flanker	Germany

Player	Position	Union
Franck Moutsinga	Scrum-half	Germany
Jeannot Moutsinga	Scrum-half	Germany
Sven Heinicke	Scrum-half	Germany
Bruno Hernandez	Fly-half	Germany
Colin Grzanna	Centre	Germany
Reinhard Aust	Centre	Germany
Jannis Hegenwald	Centre	Germany
Max Hechler	Centre	Germany
Marc Wiegand	Centre	Germany
Sebastian Freund	Wing	Germany
Sandy Oberpichler	Wing	Germany
Hendrik van Look	Wing	Germany
Martin Freund	Wing	Germany
Tunesias Firas Hassani	Wing	Germany
Igor Huerta	Wing	Germany
John Afu	Wing	Germany
Raphael Hackl	Fullback	Germany

- Coach: (Germany) Colin Grzanna
- Source: Berliner Rugby Club team info at totalrugby.de

=== RK 03 Berlin ===
RK 03 Berlin team kit

Note: Flags indicate national union under World Rugby eligibility rules. Players may hold more than one non-World Rugby nationality.

Player	Position	Union
Ronny Chlebik	Hooker	Germany
Robert Fischer	Hooker	Germany
Peter Mayr	Hooker	Germany
Alexander Paul	Hooker	Germany
Christof Hannemann	Hooker	Germany
Christian Köppe	Prop	Germany
Alexander Schmidt	Prop	Germany
Benjamin Thiering	Prop	Germany
Frank Willemsen	Prop	Netherlands
Maik Lenzner	Prop	Germany
Jonathan Malings	Prop	England
Markus Danke	Lock	Germany
Haris Dzamastagic	Lock	Bosnia and Herzegovina
Sascha Freitag	Lock	Germany
Marc Frese	Lock	Germany
Henrik Gaida	Lock	Germany
Kolja Nährig	Lock	Germany
Lukas Rosenthal	Lock	Germany
Lars Hinrich	Lock	Germany
Maximilian Beerbaum	Flanker	Germany
Bert Burtzlaff	Flanker	Germany
Anel Dzamastagic	Flanker	Bosnia and Herzegovina
Sascha Ebel	Flanker	Germany
Sébastien Gibard	Flanker	Germany
Frank Hofmann	Flanker	Germany
Lutz Joachim	Flanker	Germany
Alec Schulze	Flanker	Germany
Felix Schlechtriem	Flanker	Germany
Felix Tegler	Flanker	Germany
Hendrik Mugele	Flanker	Germany

Player	Position	Union
Hannes Füchtenschnieder	Scrum-half	Germany
Michael Koch	Scrum-half	Germany
Christian Lill	Scrum-half	Germany
Remi Williams	Scrum-half	United States
Marcel Gahlen	Fly-half	Germany
Daniel Kühn	Fly-half	Germany
Frederic Gibard	Fly-half	Germany
Falk Duwe	Centre	Germany
Carsten Gedra	Centre	Germany
Konstantin Lorenz	Centre	Germany
Jan Sydow	Centre	Germany
Benjamin Ulrich	Centre	Germany
Steffen Hahn	Wing	Germany
Max Maihorn	Wing	Germany
Sebastian Wendland	Wing	Germany
Robin Knüpfer	Wing	Germany
Max Joachim	Fullback	Germany
Derek Bading	Fullback	Germany
Nico Rothgänger	Fullback	Germany

- Coach: (Germany) Christian Lill
- Source: RK 03 Berlin team info at totalrugby.de

=== SC 1880 Frankfurt ===
SC 1880 Frankfurt team kit

Note: Flags indicate national union under World Rugby eligibility rules. Players may hold more than one non-World Rugby nationality.

Player	Position	Union
Jamie Houston	Hooker	England
James Anabell	Hooker	New Zealand
Joyce Waugham	Prop	New Zealand
Chris Howells	Prop	Germany
Mike Howells	Prop	Germany
Syd Douglas	Prop	New Zealand
Kuramate Tama Tuirirangi	Prop	New Zealand
Ralph Klinghammer (c)	Prop	Germany
Daniel Preussner	Lock	Germany
Corey Read	Lock	New Zealand
Julian Hoss	Lock	Germany
Jannis Läpple	Lock	Germany
Rolf Wacha	Flanker	Germany
Andrew Porter	Flanker	New Zealand
Aaron Satchwell	Flanker	New Zealand
Karsten Dobs	Flanker	Germany
Ross Warrick	Flanker	New Zealand

Player	Position	Union
Dennis Feidelberg	Scrum-half	Germany
Api Matenga	Scrum-half	New Zealand
José Holgado	Scrum-half	Uruguay
Jason Campell	Fly-half	New Zealand
Marcus Seuseu	Centre	New Zealand
Philip Aporo	Centre	New Zealand
Bratley Langenhoven	Centre	Namibia
Anton Ewald	Wing	Germany
Kieran Manawatu	Wing	New Zealand
Alexander Berwing	Wing	Germany
Jovesa Naivalu	Wing	Fiji
Ben Brierley	Wing	England
Rusell Kupa	Fullback	New Zealand
Stefan Kunde	Fullback	Germany

- Coach: (New Zealand) Lofty Stevenson
- Source: SC 1880 Frankfurt team info at totalrugby.de

=== DRC Hannover ===
DRC Hannover team kit

Note: Flags indicate national union under World Rugby eligibility rules. Players may hold more than one non-World Rugby nationality.

Player	Position	Union
Michael Dörries	Hooker	Germany
Stefan Diedrichs	Hooker	Germany
René Wendland	Prop	Germany
Andy McGee	Prop	Germany
Christian Schumacher	Prop	Germany
Anton Mehlmann	Prop	Germany
Tekei Aisea	Prop	Fiji
Hüseyin Yesik	Prop	Germany
Mika Tyumenev	Prop	Germany
Benjamin Danso	Lock	Germany
Harmen Gehrke	Lock	Germany
Alifereti Tabacala	Lock	Fiji
Nikolas von Karneke	Lock	Germany
Ian Oates	Lock	England
Sven Pausch	Flanker	Germany
Jean-Christophe Detay	Flanker	France
Sebastian Kühl	Flanker	Germany
Laveta Matanisiga	Flanker	Fiji
Stuart Shepherd	Flanker	Scotland
Ross Naakes	Flanker	England

Player	Position	Union
Guy Page	Scrum-half	England
Dan Richards	Fly-half	New Zealand
Alexander Luft	Centre	Germany
Semesa Rokoduguni	Centre	Fiji
Jürgen Schmidt	Centre	Germany
Stevie Lee	Centre	England
Benjamin Zeimet	Wing	Germany
Jason Lee Brown	Wing	England
Sven Spitzner	Wing	Germany
Vilive Dakunimata	Wing	Fiji
Sven Künnecke	Wing	Germany
Björn Dreske	Wing	Germany
Robert Schiffer	Wing	Germany
Andrej Merkel	Wing	Germany
Sven Lauermann	Wing	Germany
John Nacamavutu	Wing	Fiji
Nathaniel Kenrick	Wing	England
Marc Lowdon	Fullback	Germany
Dennis Jungk	Fullback	Germany

- Coach: (United Kingdom) George Kenrick
- Source: DRC Hannover team info at totalrugby.de

=== Heidelberger RK ===
Heidelberger RK team kit

Note: Flags indicate national union under World Rugby eligibility rules. Players may hold more than one non-World Rugby nationality.

Player	Position	Union
Alexander Biskupek	Hooker	Germany
Johannes Erasmus	Hooker	South Africa
Erkut Leventdurmus	Hooker	Germany
Arthur Zeiler	Prop	Germany
Frederik Potgieter	Prop	South Africa
Benedikt Rehm	Prop	Germany
Patrick Schliwa	Prop	Germany
Henry James Burridge	Lock	Australia
Julio David Rodriguez	Lock	Venezuela
Sascha Fraser	Flanker	Germany
Dan Armitage	Flanker	Australia
Tobias Engels	Flanker	Germany
Andreas Kerber	Flanker	Germany
Jochen Kerber	Flanker	Germany
Carlo Schmidt	Flanker	Germany
Manuel Ballerin	Flanker	Germany
Ewan McGregor	Flanker	Australia
Marc Kielnecker	Flanker	Germany

Player	Position	Union
Marco Klatt	Scrum-half	Germany
Christoffer Neureuther	Scrum-half	Germany
Sean Armstrong	Scrum-half	Australia
Andreas Götz	Fly-half	Germany
Thomas Körner	Fly-half	Germany
Christopher Liebig	Fly-half	Germany
Sydney Brenner	Centre	Germany
Pieter Johannes Jordaan	Centre	South Africa
Steffen Liebig	Centre	Germany
Dominik Bastian	Centre	Germany
Malte Bieringer	Wing	Germany
David Huber	Wing	Germany
Jürgen Missal	Wing	Germany
Christoph Treiber	Wing	Germany
Braam Pretorius	Fullback	South Africa

- Coach: (Australia) Murray Archibald
- Source: Heidelberger RK team info at totalrugby.de

=== RG Heidelberg ===
RG Heidelberg team kit

Note: Flags indicate national union under World Rugby eligibility rules. Players may hold more than one non-World Rugby nationality.

Player	Position	Union
Tim Coly	Hooker	Germany
Mohammad Kabir	Hooker	Germany
Falk Schmitt	Hooker	Germany
Pierre Faber	Prop	France
Miguel Bleickert	Prop	Germany
Florian Finsterer	Prop	Germany
Gian-Luca Salerno	Prop	Germany
Kai Nagel	Prop	Germany
Timo Rohleder	Prop	Germany
Manuel Wilhelm	Lock	Germany
Christoph Hug	Lock	Germany
Sebastian Werle	Lock	Germany
Florian von Reischach	Lock	Germany
Steffen Horn	Lock	Germany
Kehoma Brenner	Flanker	Germany
Constatine Dinah	Flanker	Uganda
Armin Ergert	Flanker	Germany
Jeff Tigere	Flanker	Uganda
Niklas von Reischach	Flanker	Germany
Bastian Böhm	Flanker	Germany

Player	Position	Union
Mustafa Güngör (c)	Scrum-half	Germany
Christoph Ueberle	Scrum-half	Germany
Patrick Schachner	Fly-half	Germany
Fabian Heimpel	Fly-half	Germany
Edmoore Takaendesa	Centre	Germany
Marc Bratschke	Centre	Germany
Kristian Schachner	Centre	Germany
Holger Wüst	Centre	Germany
Nemedin Qallaku	Wing	Albania (no union)
Christopher Müller	Wing	Germany
Constantin Hocke	Wing	Germany
Michael Ahl	Wing	Germany
Carl Daniel Cole	Wing	Germany
Lukas Lehmann	Fullback	Germany
Stefan Schmitt	Fullback	Germany

- Coach: (Germany) Thomas Kurzer
- Source: RG Heidelberg team info at totalrugby.de

=== RK Heusenstamm ===
RK Heusenstamm team kit

Note: Flags indicate national union under World Rugby eligibility rules. Players may hold more than one non-World Rugby nationality.

Player	Position	Union
Adrian Heber	Hooker	Germany
Gino Gennaro	Hooker	Germany
Ralph McInally	Hooker	England
Tyler Ashworth	Hooker	New Zealand
Marc Vogelmann	Prop	Germany
Torsten Krapscha	Prop	Germany
Benjamin Polheim	Prop	Germany
Sebastian Wagener	Prop	Germany
Jörg Kazubowski	Prop	Germany
Florian Heberer	Prop	Germany
Olaf Gersch	Prop	Germany
Benoit Grob	Lock	Germany
Martin Förtsch	Lock	Germany
Matthias Krebs	Lock	Germany
Nicholas Rainger	Lock	Germany
Felix Manger	Lock	Germany
Frederik Eckert	Lock	Germany
Götz Bauernfeind	Flanker	Germany
Markus Otterbein	Flanker	Germany
Thomas Nöth	Flanker	Germany
Sebastian Hartmann	Flanker	Germany
Max Dahlke	Flanker	Germany
Salem Cavus	Flanker	Germany
Bartholomew Karalus	Flanker	New Zealand
Malte Müller	Flanker	Germany
Cameron Ogle	Flanker	New Zealand

Player	Position	Union
Pascal Schuster	Scrum-half	Germany
Laurent Hartmann	Scrum-half	Germany
Phillip Weigand	Scrum-half	Germany
Jan Zeiger	Scrum-half	Germany
Thomas August	Fly-half	France
Max Pietrek	Fly-half	Germany
Markus Walger	Centre	Germany
Dennis Walger	Centre	Germany
Tobias Apelt	Centre	Germany
Florian Huber	Centre	Germany
Sam Rainger	Centre	Germany
Mark Sztyndera	Wing	Germany
Matt Poulton	Wing	Germany
Jonas Friedrich	Wing	Germany
Roland Messerklinger	Wing	Germany
Willi Beitler	Wing	Germany
Christian Roth	Wing	Germany
Bevan Gray	Fullback	New Zealand

- Coach: (Germany) Jens Steinweg
- Source: RK Heusenstamm team info at totalrugby.de

=== TSV Handschuhsheim ===
TSV Handschuhsheim team kit

Note: Flags indicate national union under World Rugby eligibility rules. Players may hold more than one non-World Rugby nationality.

Player	Position	Union
Christian Schröder	Hooker	Austria
Mathias Jech	Hooker	Germany
Thomas Müller	Hooker	Germany
Sven Wetzel	Hooker	Germany
Felix Bayer	Prop	Germany
René Engelhardt	Prop	Germany
Marcus Bender	Prop	Germany
Oliver Otto	Prop	Germany
Raphael Konarski	Prop	Germany
Phillipp Schröder	Prop	Germany
Jens Schmidt	Lock	Germany
Johannes Laule	Lock	Germany
Stefen Horwarth	Lock	Germany
Alexander Pipa	Flanker	Germany
Alexander Hug	Flanker	Germany
Alexander Metz	Flanker	Germany
Gregor Hartmann	Flanker	Germany
Lukas Hübschmann	Flanker	Germany
Patrick Eiermann	Flanker	Germany
Frank Genthner	Flanker	Germany

Player	Position	Union
Christoph Heising	Scrum-half	Germany
Moritz Bayer	Scrum-half	Germany
Tonio Krüger	Scrum-half	Germany
Thorsten Wiedemann	Fly-half	Germany
Christopher Lorenz	Fly-half	Germany
Nico Strohmeier	Fly-half	Germany
Sebastien Chaule	Centre	Germany
Anjo Buckman	Centre	Germany
Benjamin Lortz	Centre	Germany
Yassin Ayachi	Centre	Germany
Daniel Lortz	Centre	Germany
Robert Boge	Centre	Germany
Christian Helmle	Centre	Germany
Ruben May	Wing	Germany
Sebastian Bommes	Wing	Germany
Sebastian Lorenz	Wing	Germany
Matthias Pipa	Fullback	Germany
Louis Stelling	Fullback	England

- Coach: (Germany) Mathias Bechtel
- Source: TSV Handschuhsheim team info at totalrugby.de

=== SC Neuenheim ===
SC Neuenheim team kit

Note: Flags indicate national union under World Rugby eligibility rules. Players may hold more than one non-World Rugby nationality.

Player	Position	Union
Klaus Mainzer	Hooker	Germany
Grigol Sanadiradze	Hooker	(Georgia (country)) Georgia
Christian Baracat	Prop	Germany
Marcus Trick	Prop	Germany
Steve Williams	Prop	Australia
Fernando Gonzalez	Prop	Paraguay
Björn Strauch	Prop	Germany
Jan Fassbender	Prop	Germany
Christian Hug	Lock	Germany
Bernd Mährlein	Lock	Germany
Steven Lazarus	Lock	Germany
Armon Trick	Lock	Switzerland
Karli Hauck	Flanker	Germany
Shalva Didebashvili	Flanker	(Georgia (country)) Georgia
Michael Kerr	Flanker	New Zealand
Fabio Colman	Flanker	Paraguay
Holger Landefeld	Flanker	Germany
Juan Cabanas	Flanker	Paraguay
Michael Wiegandt	Flanker	Germany

Player	Position	Union
Mike McCarty	Flanker	United States
Denis Jaschik	Flanker	Germany
Gerbrand DuPreez	Flanker	South Africa
Adam Taylor	Flanker	England
Dominic Gantz	Scrum-half	Germany
Jacob Scheurich	Scrum-half	Germany
Lars Eckert	Fly-half	Germany
Marten Strauch	Centre	Germany
Shaun Smit	Centre	Zimbabwe
Wilke Andrew Schoeman	Centre	Namibia
Jan Becker	Wing	Germany
Sébastien Hervé	Wing	France
Udo Schwarz	Wing	Germany
Florian Walter	Wing	Germany
Willem Smit	Fullback	South Africa
Warren Heilig	Fullback	New Zealand
Manasah Sita	Fullback	Zimbabwe

- Coach: (Germany) Mark Kuhlmann
- Source: SC Neuenheim team info at totalrugby.de
