= Germany at the 2006–2008 European Nations Cup =

Germany
- 2006–2008 season
- Head coach: Rudolf Finsterer; Mark Kuhlmann; Bruno Stolorz
- Chairman: Claus-Peter Bach
- ENC Second Division: Champions
- Top try scorer: League: Güngör (6)
- Top points scorer: League: Franke (96)
- Highest home attendance: 8,213

Germany at the 2006–2008 European Nations Cup was the first time since 1981 that the German national rugby union team reached highest level of FIRA rugby, the European Nations Cup, by winning its group, the Division 2A in 2006–2008.

Germany played eight competition games and three friendlies in its campaign. It won six of its eight competitive games, including all four home games, and all three friendlies. It played Switzerland twice, to contest the newly created Alpencup, which remained with Germany on both occasions.

With over 8,000 spectators, Germany's home game against the Netherlands in Hanover, at the Rudolf-Kalweit-Stadion, achieved the best crowd figures for a rugby match in Germany since the pre-Second World War days.

Germany went into its campaign unbeaten at home, having last lost on 12 November 2000, to Ukraine. It maintained this record, which was only broken early in its next campaign, on 8 November 2008, when it lost to a Welsh XV.

== Background ==
The division Germany was playing in, Division 2A, consisted of five teams, of which Ukraine had been relegated to from the First Division in the previous edition of the European Nations Cup.

The winner, Germany, earned promotion to the First Division, while the last placed team, the Netherlands, were relegated to Division 2B.

== Management and coaching ==
At the beginning of Germany's ENC campaign, it was coached by a duo, made up of Rudolf Finsterer and Mark Kuhlmann, under the supervision of Peter Ianusevici, Germany's Director of Rugby.

In early 2008, the two were joined by Frenchman Bruno Stolorz. Stolorz was seconded to the German team by the Fédération française de rugby to improve Germany's performance in the sport and is also a coach with French club team RC Orléans, where he fulfills the position of a Conseiller sportif auprès.

== Debuts and retirements ==
A number of German players made their final appearances for their country during the 2006-08 campaign, among them were regulars like Steffen Thier, Sascha Fischer and Klaus Mainzer.

The former were replaced by a number of debutants, among them the Zimbabwean Edmoore Takaendesa and the Australian Steve Williams.

== Table ==
Place	Nation	Games				Points			Table points
Place	Nation	played	won	drawn	lost	for	against	difference	Table points
1	Germany	8	6	0	2	191	124	+67	20
2	Belgium	8	6	0	2	214	147	+67	20
3	Moldova	8	5	0	3	163	157	+6	18
4	Ukraine	8	3	0	5	117	128	-11	14
5	Netherlands	8	0	0	8	97	226	-129	8

- In the event of a tie the following rules apply: champion to be decided by 1. Winner of the games between tied teams 2. Best difference points for and against in all pool matches 3. Best difference between tried in all pool matches 4. Higher number of points 5. Higher number of tries
- Germany was promoted because they won on aggregate in the two games played between them and Belgium (32 - 13 and 18 - 32 giving an aggregate of 50 - 45).

== Games ==
=== ENC matches ===
2006-11-11
12:00

Moldova	26 – 24	Germany
Try: (4) 3', 21', 30', 68'; Pen: (2) 11', 80'	(Line up) (Report)	Try: Güngör 40'+, Franke 63'; Con: Franke 40'+ Pen: Franke (4) 23', 28', 40', 78'

Chişinău
Attendance: 500
Referee: Bernard dal Maso (France)

2006-11-18
15:00

Germany	32 – 13	Belgium
Try: Güngör 28', Chaule 46', ??? Con: Franke 28'; Pen: Franke (5) 2', 6', 15', 24', 67'	(Line up) (Report)	Try: (1); Con: (1); Pen: (2)

Fritz-Grunebaum-Sportpark, Heidelberg
Attendance: 2,700
Referee: Stefano Mancini (Italy)

2007-04-21
15:00

Ukraine	14 – 22	Germany
Try: (2) 6', 36'; Con: (2) 6', 36'	(Line up) (Report)	Try: Güngör 40'+ Con: Franke 40'+ Pen: Franke (5) 2', 30', 38', 49', 80'

Kyiv
Attendance: 1,000
Referee: Tomas Tuma (Czech Republic)

2007-04-28
15:00

Germany	21 – 12	Netherlands
Try: Güngör 5', Steffen Thier; Con: Franke 5'; Pen: Franke (3) 49', 65', 70'	(Line up) (Report)	Try: (2); Con: (1)

Rudolf-Kalweit-Stadion, Hanover
Attendance: 8,213

2007-11-10

Belgium	32 – 18	Germany
Try: Wey, Verschelden, Nana, Niell; Con: A. Williams (3); Pen: A. Williams (2)	(Line up) (Report)	Try: Franke 56', Tekkal 70'; Con: Eckert 70'; Pen: Franke 8', Eckert 47'

King Baudouin Stadium, Brussels
Attendance: 2,500
Referee: Felix Villegas Casado (Spain)

2007-11-24
15:00

Germany	34 – 5	Moldova
Try: Grzanna (2) 19', 25', Kasten 60', Strauch 76'; Con: Franke (4) 19', 25', 60', 76'; Pen: Franke (2) 4', 45'	(Line up) (Report)	Try: Romanov 52'

Fritz-Grunebaum-Sportpark, Heidelberg
Attendance: 2,800
Referee: Jaroslav Bednarik (Czech Republic)

2008-04-19
14:30

Germany	13 – 5	Ukraine
Try: Grzanna 58'; Con: Franke 58'; Pen: Franke 17'; Drop: Güngör 26'	(Line up) (Report)	Try: Orlov 34'

Rudolf-Kalweit-Stadion, Hanover
Attendance: 6,735
Referee: Gabriel Seitan (Romania)

2008-04-26

Netherlands	17 – 27	Germany
Try: Knox 29', Bonhof 40', Lingsma 65'; Con: Lingsma 40'	(Line up) (Report)	Try: Güngör (2) 20', 75'; Con: Franke 20'; Pen: Davies (3) 32', 39', 50', Franke 69'; Drop: Grzanna 79'

Amsterdam
Attendance: 1,000
Referee: Tony Raduta (Romania)

=== Friendlies ===
2006-09-16

Switzerland	10 – 40	Germany
	(Report)

Allmend Stadium, Bern

2007-02-24

Welsh Districts XV (Wales)	13 – 24	Germany
Try: Parry, Palmer; Pen: Warman	(Line up)	Try: Kasten, Danso, Kerr; Con: Franke (3); Pen: Franke

Pontypridd Stadium, Pontypridd
Attendance: 500
Referee: Dale Hewitt (England)

2007-09-29

Germany	49 – 13	Switzerland
Try: Walger (3), Strauch (2), Pipa, Pyrasch; Con: Eckert (5), Wiedemann (2)	(Line up)	Try: Betten, Hösel; Pen: Nicholas

Frankfurt am Main

== Player statistics ==
=== Squad ===
The following players were part of the German team during its 2006-08 campaign:

Backs
Player	Position	Club
Mustafa Güngör	Scrum-half	RG Heidelberg
Raphael Pyrasch	Scrum-half	DSV 78 Hannover
Franck Moutsinga	Scrum-half	Berliner RC
Christopher Parnham	Scrum-half	(England) Clifton RFC
Kieron Davies	Fly-half	(England) Luton RFC
Thorsten Wiedemann	Fly-half	TSV Handschuhsheim
Lars Eckert	Fly-half	SC Neuenheim
Friedrich Michau	Fly-half	FC St Pauli
Benjamin Simm	Centre	DSV 78 Hannover
Clemens von Grumbkow	Centre	(France) RC Orléans
Christopher Weselek	Centre	RG Heidelberg
Colin Grzanna	Centre	Berliner RC
Marten Strauch	Centre	SC Neuenheim
Sebastien Chaule	Wing	TSV Handschuhsheim
Markus Walger	Wing	RK Heusenstamm
Matthieu Franke	Fullback	(France) RC Orléans
Edmoore Takaendesa	Fullback	RG Heidelberg
Dennis Walger	Fullback	RK Heusenstamm

Forwards
Player	Position	Club
Klaus Mainzer	Hooker	SC Neuenheim
Tim Coly	Hooker	RG Heidelberg
Christian Baracat	Prop	SC 1880 Frankfurt
Benjamin Krause	Prop	DSV 78 Hannover
Marcus Trick	Prop	SC Neuenheim
Alexander Widiker	Prop	(France) RC Orléans
Pierre Faber	Prop	(France) Stade Dijonnais
Steve Williams	Prop	SC Neuenheim
Krystian Trochowski	Prop	Berliner RC
Benjamin Danso	Lock	DRC Hannover
Jens Schmidt	Lock	TSV Handschuhsheim
Bodo Sieber	Lock	(South Africa) University of Cape Town
Manuel Wilhelm	Lock	RG Heidelberg
Sebastian Werle	Lock	RG Heidelberg
Sascha Fischer	Lock	(France) Le Bugue athletic club
Rolf Wacha	Lock	SC 1880 Frankfurt
Christian Hug	Lock	SC Neuenheim
Kehoma Brenner	Flanker	RG Heidelberg
Tim Kasten	Flanker	RG Heidelberg
Alexander Hug	Flanker	TSV Handschuhsheim
Alexander Pipa	Flanker	TSV Handschuhsheim
Gerrit van Look	Flanker	Berliner RC
Timur Tekkal	Flanker	DRC Hannover
Steffen Thier	Flanker	RG Heidelberg
Michael Kerr	Flanker	SC Neuenheim

- Clubs listed are the club or clubs a player played for while playing for Germany in 2006-08, not current club.

=== Games ===
The following players have been selected for Germany from 2006 to 2008 in the country's European Nation Cup Second Division campaign and in friendlies:

Player	**Caps**	**2006**			**2007**						**2008**	
		**Swi** ^{2}	**Mol**	**Bel**	**W XV**	**Ukr**	**Ned**	**Swi**	**Bel**	**Mol**	**Ukr**	**Ned**
Benjamin Krause	26	x			**3** (substituted off)	**1** (substituted off)	**1** (substituted off)	**2**	**2**	**1**	**1**	**1**
Tim Coly	23		**2**	**2** (substituted off)		**2** (substituted off)	**2** (substituted off)				**2** (substituted off)	**2** (substituted off)
Alexander Widiker	27		**1**	**1**	**1**	**3**	**3**		**1** (yellow card)	**3** (substituted off)	**3** (yellow card)	**3**
Manuel Wilhelm	20		**19** (substituted in)	**4** (substituted off)		**5**	**5** (substituted off)			**4** (substituted off)	**4** (substituted off)	**4** (substituted off)
Jens Schmidt	33	x	**5** (c)	**5** (c)	**7** (c)	**8** (c)	**7** (c) (substituted off)	**5** (c) (substituted off)	**4** (substituted off)		**18** (substituted in)	**5** (substituted off)
Tim Kasten	17	x	**6**	**8**	**6** (substituted off)				**6** (substituted off)	**6**	**6**	**6** (substituted off)
Gerrit van Look	15	x	**7** (substituted off)	**6**	**8** (substituted off)	**6**	**6** (yellow card)		**7**	**8**	**7**	**7**
Bodo Sieber	15					**4**	**4** (substituted off)		**8**	**5**	**5**	**8**
Mustafa Güngör	20	x	**9**	**9** (substituted off)	**14**	**9**	**9**		**9**	**9**	**9**	**9**
Lars Eckert	17	x	**10** (substituted off)	**10** (substituted off)	**10**	**10**	**10** (substituted off)	**10** (substituted off)	**10**	**10**	**10**	**10**
Matthieu Franke	9		**15**	**15**	**15**	**15**	**15**		**15**	**15**	**14**	**11**
Colin Grzanna	22	x	**12**	**13**	**12**	**12**	**12**	**12**	**12** (c)	**12** (substituted off) (c)	**12** (substituted off) (c)	**12** (c)
Kieron Davies	23		**21** (substituted in)	**21** (substituted in)							**13**	**13** (substituted off)
Christopher Weselek	25	x	**14**	**14**	**11**	**11** (substituted off)	**11**	**14**	**13**	**14**	**22** (substituted in)	**14** (substituted off)
Edmoore Takaendesa	2										**15**	**15** (substituted off)
Steve Williams	3									**2** (substituted off)	**16** (substituted in)	**16** (substituted in)
Benjamin Danso	10	x	18	**18** (substituted in)	**4** (substituted off)	**16** (substituted in)	**19** (substituted in)	**4**	18	**18** (substituted in)	**19** (substituted in)	**17** (substituted in)
Alexander Pipa								**7** (substituted off)			**8** (substituted off)	**18** (substituted in)
Rolf Wacha	2							**6**				**19** (substituted in)
Sebastien Chaule	14	x	**11**	**11** (yellow card) (substituted off)				**15**	**21** (substituted in)	**21** (substituted in)	20	**20** (substituted in)
Markus Walger	16	x						**11**	**11**	**11** (substituted off)	21	**21** (substituted in)
Marten Strauch	5				21	**20** (substituted in)	**20** (substituted in)	**13** (substituted off)	22	**22** (substituted in)		**22** (substituted in)
Clemens von Grumbkow	18		**13**	**12**	^{(1)}	**13**	**13**		**14**	**13** (substituted off)	**11**	
Kehoma Brenner	4		**17** (substituted in)	**17** (substituted in)				**17** (substituted in)	17	**17** (substituted in)	17	
Steffen Thier		x	**8**	**7** (substituted off)			**8** (substituted off)			**7** (substituted off)		
Christian Baracat	3				17			**3** (substituted off)	**16** (substituted in)	**16** (substituted in)		
Timur Tekkal		x				**7** (substituted off)		**8**	**19** (substituted in)	**19** (substituted in)		
Franck Moutsinga	10	x	20	**20** (substituted in)	**9** (substituted off)	21	21	**9** (substituted off)	20	20		
Pierre Faber	18		**3** (yellow card) (substituted off)	**3** (substituted off)					**2** (substituted off)			
Sascha Fischer	27				**5**				**5** (yellow card)			
Klaus Mainzer		x	**16** (substituted in)	**16** (substituted in)	**2**	**18** (substituted in)	**16** (substituted in)	**1** (substituted off)				
Krystian Trochowski					**16** (substituted in)			**16** (substituted in)				
Christian Hug		x	**4** (substituted off)	**19** (substituted in)				**18** (substituted in)				
Alexander Hug	1							**19** (substituted in)				
Raphael Pyrasch	1							**20** (substituted in)				
Thorsten Wiedemann	1							**21** (substituted in)				
Dennis Walger	1							**22** (substituted in)				
Benjamin Simm	7			**22** (substituted in)	**13**	**14**	**14**					
Marcus Trick	19	x				**17** (substituted in)	**17** (substituted in)					
Sebastian Werle					**19** (substituted in)	20	**18** (substituted in)					
Friedrich Michau						22	**22** (substituted in)					
Michael Kerr					**18** (substituted in)							
Christopher Parnham					**20**							
Christian Doering		x	22									
Hendrik van Look		x										
Michael Döries		x										
Alexander Luft		x										
Rene Engelhardt		x										

- Number of caps as of end of ENC campaign, 26 April 2008, not overall.
- ^{1} Clemens von Grumbkow was injured prior to the match and Germany only went with 21 players into the game.
- ^{2} Only squad known for the Switzerland game, no positions.
- **Bold** numbers indicate player played in the game.
- Italics indicates did not play.
- denotes substituted off.
- (substituted in) denotes substituted on.
- (c) denotes captain.
- (yellow card) denotes sin bin.

=== Scorers (ENC) ===
==== Try scorers ====
Tries	Name	Pld
6	Mustafa Güngör	8
3	Colin Grzanna	8
2	Matthieu Franke	8
1	Timur Tekkal	3
1	Marten Strauch	4
1	Steffen Thier	4
1	Sebastien Chaule	5
1	Tim Kasten	6

==== Points scorers ====
Points	Name	Pld
96	Matthieu Franke	8
33	Mustafa Güngör	8
18	Colin Grzanna	8
9	Kieron Davies	4
5	Timur Tekkal	3
5	Marten Strauch	4
5	Steffen Thier	4
5	Sebastien Chaule	5
5	Tim Kasten	6
5	Lars Eckert	8
