= List of Germany national rugby union players =

List of Germany national rugby union players is a list of people who have played for the Germany national rugby union team. The list only includes players who have played in a Test match.

Note that the "position" column lists the position at which the player made his Test debut, not necessarily the position for which he is best known. A position in parentheses indicates that the player debuted as a substitute.

== Unofficial: Pre-1927 ==
At the 1900 Summer Olympics, Germany was represented by SC 1880 Frankfurt, with the following players being called up:

Germany's International Rugby Capped Players
Number	Name	Position	Date first cap obtained	Opposition
1	Albert Amrhein	no. 8	1900-10-14	v France XV at Paris
2	Hugo Betting	fly-half	1900-10-14	v France XV at Paris
3	Jacob Herrmann	centre	1900-10-14	v France XV at Paris
4	Willy Hofmeister	lock	1900-10-14	v France XV at Paris
5	Hermann Kreuzer	fullback	1900-10-14	v France XV at Paris
6	Arnold Landvoigt	wing	1900-10-14	v France XV at Paris
7	Hans Latscha	prop	1900-10-14	v France XV at Paris
8	Erich Ludwig	wing	1900-10-14	v France XV at Paris
9	Richard Ludwig	flanker	1900-10-14	v France XV at Paris
10	Fritz Müller	prop	1900-10-14	v France XV at Paris
11	Eduard Poppe	flanker	1900-10-14	v France XV at Paris
12	Heinrich Reitz	centre	1900-10-14	v France XV at Paris
13	August Schmierer	scrum-half	1900-10-14	v France XV at Paris
14	Adolf Stockhausen	hooker	1900-10-14	v France XV at Paris
15	Georg Wenderoth	lock	1900-10-14	v France XV at Paris

== Official: From 1927 onwards ==
The official German rugby union team's international history begun on 17 April 1927, when it played France in Paris and lost 5-30. The following players were called up for Germany since:^{[1]}

Germany's International Rugby Capped Players
Number	Name	Position	Date first cap obtained	Opposition
	Erwin Thiesies		1934	
	Horst Kemmling		1976	
	Mark Kuhlmann			
	Friedrich Michau			
	Sebastien Chaule	wing	2006-11-11	v Moldova at Chisinau
	Tim Coly	hooker	2006-11-11	v Moldova at Chisinau
	Lars Eckert	fly-half	2006-11-11	v Moldova at Chisinau
	Pierre Faber	prop	2006-11-11	v Moldova at Chisinau
	Matthieu Franke	fullback	2006-11-11	v Moldova at Chisinau
	Colin Grzanna	centre	2006-11-11	v Moldova at Chisinau
	Mustafa Güngör	scrum-half	2006-11-11	v Moldova at Chisinau
	Christian Hug	lock	2006-11-11	v Moldova at Chisinau
	Tim Kasten	flanker	2006-11-11	v Moldova at Chisinau
	Jens Schmidt	lock	2006-11-11	v Moldova at Chisinau
	Steffen Thier	no. 8	2006-11-11	v Moldova at Chisinau
	Gerrit van Look	flanker	2006-11-11	v Moldova at Chisinau
	Clemens von Grumbkow	centre	2006-11-11	v Moldova at Chisinau
	Christopher Weselek	wing	2006-11-11	v Moldova at Chisinau
	Alexander Widiker	prop	2006-11-11	v Moldova at Chisinau
	Kehoma Brenner	(replacement)	2006-11-11	v Moldova at Chisinau
	Kieron Davies	(replacement)	2006-11-11	v Moldova at Chisinau
	Manuel Wilhelm	(replacement)	2006-11-11	v Moldova at Chisinau
	Benjamin Danso	(replacement)	2006-11-18	v Belgium at Heidelberg
	Benjamin Simm	(replacement)	2006-11-18	v Belgium at Heidelberg
	Benjamin Krause		2007-02-24	v Wales Development XV at Pontypridd
	Franck Moutsinga		2007-02-24	v Wales Development XV at Pontypridd
	Sascha Fischer		2007-02-24	v Wales Development XV at Pontypridd
	Klaus Mainzer		2007-02-24	v Wales Development XV at Pontypridd
	Krystian Trochowski		2007-02-24	v Wales Development XV at Pontypridd
	Sebastian Werle		2007-02-24	v Wales Development XV at Pontypridd
	Michael Kerr		2007-02-24	v Wales Development XV at Pontypridd
	Christopher Parnham		2007-02-24	v Wales Development XV at Pontypridd
	Bodo Sieber	lock	2007-04-21	v Ukraine at Kyiv
	Timur Tekkal	flanker	2007-04-21	v Ukraine at Kyiv
	Marten Strauch	(replacement)	2007-04-21	v Ukraine at Kyiv
	Marcus Trick	(replacement)	2007-04-21	v Ukraine at Kyiv
	Thorsten Wiedemann		2007-09-29	v Switzerland at Frankfurt
	Alexander Hug		2007-09-29	v Switzerland at Frankfurt
	Dennis Walger		2007-09-29	v Switzerland at Frankfurt
	Raphael Pyrasch		2007-09-29	v Switzerland at Frankfurt
	Christian Baracat		2007-09-29	v Switzerland at Frankfurt
	Rolf Wacha		2007-09-29	v Switzerland at Frankfurt
	Markus Walger	wing	2007-11-10	v Belgium at Brussels
	Steve Williams	prop	2007-11-24	v Moldova at Heidelberg
	Alexander Pipa	no. 8	2008-04-19	v Ukraine at Hanover
	Edmoore Takaendesa	fullback	2008-04-19	v Ukraine at Hanover
	Juan Martin Goity	wing	2008-11-08	v Wales Development XV at Berlin
	Udo Schwarz	wing	2008-11-08	v Wales Development XV at Berlin
	Robert Mohr	no. 8	2008-11-15	v Spain at Madrid
	Benjamin Brierley	wing	2009-02-07	v Georgia at Heidelberg
	Michael Poppmeier	no. 8	2009-02-07	v Georgia at Heidelberg
	Damien Tussac	(replacement)	2009-02-07	v Georgia at Heidelberg
	Christopher Liebig	(replacement)	2009-02-21	v Portugal at Lisbon
	Domenick Davies	fullback	2009-05-02	v Russia at Hanover
	Rob Elloway	(replacement)	2009-05-02	v Russia at Hanover
	Jamie Houston	hooker	2009-12-12	v Hong Kong at Heidelberg
	Benjamin Ulrich	centre	2009-12-12	v Hong Kong at Heidelberg
	Anjo Buckman	(replacement)	2009-12-12	v Hong Kong at Heidelberg
	Raphael Hackl	(replacement)	2009-12-12	v Hong Kong at Heidelberg
	Alexander Hauck	(replacement)	2009-12-12	v Hong Kong at Heidelberg
	Daniel Preussner	(replacement)	2009-12-12	v Hong Kong at Heidelberg
	Patrick Schliwa	(replacement)	2009-12-12	v Hong Kong at Heidelberg
	Mark Sztyndera	(replacement)	2009-12-12	v Hong Kong at Heidelberg
	Shalva Didebashvili	flanker	2010-02-06	v Georgia at Tbilisi
	Guillaume Franke	fly-half	2010-02-06	v Georgia at Tbilisi
	Lukas Hinds-Johnson	lock	2010-02-06	v Georgia at Tbilisi
	Steffen Liebig	fullback	2010-02-06	v Georgia at Tbilisi
	Lukas Rosenthal	no. 8	2010-02-06	v Georgia at Tbilisi
	Alexander Metz	flanker	2010-02-13	v Romania at Constanta
	Fabian Heimpel	fly-half	2010-02-27	v Portugal at Heusenstamm
	Gilles Pagnon	centre	2010-03-13	v Russia at Sochi
	James Keinhorst	wing	2010-11-20	v Poland at Frankfurt
	Arthur Zeiler	prop	2010-11-20	v Poland at Frankfurt
	Tim Menzel	(replacement)	2010-11-20	v Poland at Frankfurt
	Sven Wetzel	(replacement)	2010-11-20	v Poland at Frankfurt
	Sam Henderson	flanker	2010-11-27	v Netherlands at Amsterdam
	Nico Kanning	(replacement)	2010-11-27	v Netherlands at Amsterdam
	Bastian Himmer	wing	2010-12-11	v Hong Kong at Heidelberg
	Jannis Läpple	(replacement)	2010-12-11	v Hong Kong at Heidelberg
	Daniel Armitage	lock	2011-03-12	v Czech Republic at Heidelberg
	Pieter Jordaan	centre	2011-03-19	v Belgium at Brussels
	Gilles Valette	hooker	2011-04-02	v Moldova at Chişinău
	Felix Bayer	prop	2011-04-02	v Moldova at Chişinău

== Notes ==
- ^[1] Scrum.com, the main source for this list, lists Germany games from the Moldova game in November 2006 onwards and ignores all debuts made before that date. Players not individually referenced may have had their debuts before November 2006.
