= Christian Hug =

German rugby union player

- Born: Christian Hug; March 24, 1982 (age 44) Heidelberg, West Germany
- Height: 1.94 m (6 ft 4 1/2 in)
- Weight: 112 kg (17 st 9 lb)

Rugby union career
- Position: Lock
Amateur team(s)
Years	Team	Apps	(Points)
2001 - present	SC Neuenheim		
- Correct as of 20 March 2009
International career
Years	Team	Apps	(Points)
2007	Germany		
- Correct as of 20 March 2009

Christian Hug (born 24 March 1982 in Heidelberg, West Germany) is a German international rugby union player, playing for the SC Neuenheim in the Rugby-Bundesliga and the German national rugby union team.

== Biography ==
Hug played for Germany on a number of occasions and his last international was a friendly against Switzerland in 2007.

On domestic level, he won two German championships with his club team in 2003 and 2004 against DRC Hannover and made losing appearances in the 2001 finals against DRC Hannover and again in 2006 against RG Heidelberg.

== Honours ==
=== National team ===
- European Nations Cup - Division 2
  - Champions: 2008

=== Club ===
- German rugby union championship
  - Winner: 2003, 2004
  - Runners up: 2001, 2006
- German rugby union cup
  - Winner: 2001
  - Runners up: 2002

== Stats ==
Christian Hug's personal statistics in club and international rugby:

=== National team ===
==== European Nations Cup ====
Year	Team	Competition	Games	Points	Place
2006-2008	Germany	European Nations Cup Second Division	2	0	Champions

==== Friendlies & other competitions ====
Year	Team	Competition	Games	Points
2007	Germany	Friendly	1	0

- As of 15 December 2010

=== Club ===
Year	Club	Division	Games	Tries	Con	Pen	DG	Place
2008-09	SC Neuenheim	Rugby-Bundesliga	12	2	0	0	0	3rd — Semi-finals
2009-10	SC Neuenheim	Rugby-Bundesliga	7	0	0	0	0	5th
2010-11	SC Neuenheim	Rugby-Bundesliga	15	1	0	0	0	5th
2011-12	SC Neuenheim	Rugby-Bundesliga	17	0	0	0	0	4th — Semi-finals

- As of 30 April 2012
