= Timur Tekkal =

German rugby union player

- Born: Timur Tekkal; 3 June 1981 (age 45) Hannover, Germany
- Height: 1.89 m (6 ft 2 in)
- Weight: 98 kg (15 st 6 lb)

Rugby union career
- Position: Number eight
Senior career
Years	Team	Apps	(Points)
–	Germania		
–	DRC		
–	Victoria		
2011 - present	DSV 78	16	(5)
- Correct as of 30 April 2012
International career
Years	Team	Apps	(Points)
2004 - 2009	Germany		
- Correct as of 7 March 2010
National sevens team
Years	Team		Comps
- Germany 7's

Timur Tekkal (born 3 June 1981) is a German international rugby union player. He was born in Hannover, and for the DSV 78 Hannover in the Rugby-Bundesliga.

He made his international debut for Germany in 2004 against the Netherlands and his last game on 2 May 2009 against Russia.

He plays rugby since 1988.

Tekkal has also played for the Germany's 7's side in the past, like at the 2009 Hannover Sevens and the 2009 London Sevens. He was also part of the German Sevens side at the World Games 2005 in Duisburg, where Germany finished 8th.

At the end of the 2010-11 season, Tekkal left Victoria Linden to join DSV 78 Hannover for the following season.

== Honours ==
=== National team ===
- European Nations Cup - Division 2
  - Champions: 2008

=== Club ===
- German rugby union championship
  - Champions: 2000
- German rugby union cup
  - Champions: 2000

== Stats ==
Timur Tekkal's personal statistics in club and international rugby:

=== Club ===
Year	Club	Division	Games	Tries	Con	Pen	DG	Place
2008-09	TSV Victoria Linden	2nd Rugby-Bundesliga	0	0	0	0	0	2nd
2009-10	TSV Victoria Linden	2nd Rugby-Bundesliga	1	1	0	0	0	1st
2010-11	TSV Victoria Linden	2nd Rugby-Bundesliga	1	2	0	0	0	1st
2011-12	DSV 78 Hannover	Rugby-Bundesliga	16	1	0	0	0	7th

- As of 30 April 2012

=== National team ===
==== European Nations Cup ====
Year	Team	Competition	Games	Points	Place
2006-2008	Germany	European Nations Cup Second Division	3	5	Champions
2008-2010	Germany	European Nations Cup First Division	1	0	6th — Relegated

==== Friendlies & other competitions ====
Year	Team	Competition	Games	Points
2007	Germany	Friendly	1	0

- As of 7 March 2010
