= Steffen Thier =

German rugby union player

- Born: Steffen Thier; November 25, 1980 (age 45)
- Height: 1.89 m (6 ft 2 in)
- Weight: 99 kg (15 st 8 lb)

Rugby union career
- Position: Number eight
Amateur team(s)
Years	Team	Apps	(Points)
- RG Heidelberg
- Correct as of 6 March 2010
International career
Years	Team	Apps	(Points)
2007	Germany		
- Correct as of 6 March 2010
National sevens team
Years	Team		Comps
- Germany 7's

Steffen Thier (born 25 November 1980) is a German international rugby union player, playing for the RG Heidelberg in the Rugby-Bundesliga and the German national rugby union team.

He played his last game for Germany on 24 November 2007 against Moldova.

He has played rugby since 1994.

In the past, he captained the German sevens side.

== Honours ==
=== Club ===
- German rugby union championship
  - Champions: 2006, 2007
- German rugby union cup
  - Winners: 2004

=== National team ===
- European Nations Cup - Division 2
  - Champions: 2008

== Stats ==
Steffen Thier's personal statistics in club and international rugby:

=== Club ===
Year	Club	Division	Games	Tries	Con	Pen	DG	Place
2008-09	RG Heidelberg	Rugby-Bundesliga	2	0	0	0	0	5th
2009-10	RG Heidelberg	Rugby-Bundesliga	1	0	0	0	0	2nd — Semi-finals

- As of 23 December 2010

=== National team ===
Year	Team	Competition	Games	Points	Place
2006-2008	Germany	European Nations Cup Second Division	4	5	Champions

- As of 6 March 2010
