= Klaus Mainzer (rugby union) =

Germany international rugby union player

- Born: Klaus Mainzer; 2 February 1979 (age 47) Heidelberg, Germany
- Height: 1.78 m (5 ft 10 in)
- Weight: 112 kg (17 st 9 lb)

Rugby union career
- Position: Prop
Senior career
Years	Team	Apps	(Points)
- HTV
1998 - 2011	SCN		
2011 - present	TVP	16	(0)
- Correct as of 30 April 2012
International career
Years	Team	Apps	(Points)
2000 - 2007	Germany	15	(0)
- Correct as of 20 March 2009

Klaus Mainzer (born 2 February 1979) is a German international rugby union player, playing for the TV Pforzheim in the Rugby-Bundesliga and the German national rugby union team.

== Biography ==
Klaus Mainzer, born in Heidelberg, started playing joining local club Heidelberger TV. In 1998 he signed with SC Neuenheim. Since then he played for the SC Neuenheim. He only played one game for the club in 2009-10 because of contract disputes.

He earned his first cap for Germany in 2000 and played 15 times for Germany since then. His greatest success as a national team player was the promotion to Division 1 of the European Nations Cup in 2008. His last game for Germany was in a friendly against Switzerland in 2007.

On domestic level, he won two German championships with his club team in 2003 and 2004 against DRC Hannover and made losing appearances in the 2001 finals against DRC Hannover and again in 2006 against RG Heidelberg.

Not having played in SC Neuenheim's first team in 2010-11 because of disagreements with the clubs leadership, he joined newly promoted Bundesliga side TV Pforzheim for the 2011–12 season.

== Honours ==
=== Club ===
- German rugby union championship
  - Winner: 2003, 2004
  - Runners up: 2001, 2006, 2012
- German rugby union cup
  - Winner: 1999, 2001
  - Runners up: 2002

=== National team ===
- European Nations Cup - Division 2
  - Champions: 2008

== Stats ==
Klaus Mainzer's personal statistics in club and international rugby:

=== Club ===
Year	Club	Division	Games	Tries	Con	Pen	DG	Place
2008-09	SC Neuenheim	Rugby-Bundesliga	9	0	0	0	0	3rd — Semi-finals
2009-10	SC Neuenheim	Rugby-Bundesliga	1	0	0	0	0	5th
2010-11	SC Neuenheim	Rugby-Bundesliga	0	0	0	0	0	5th
2011-12	TV Pforzheim	Rugby-Bundesliga	16	0	0	0	0	3rd — Runners up

- As of 25 August 2011

=== National team ===
==== European Nations Cup ====
Year	Team	Competition	Games	Points	Place
2006-2008	Germany	European Nations Cup Second Division	4	0	Champions

==== Friendlies & other competitions ====
Year	Team	Competition	Games	Points
2007	Germany	Friendly	2	0

- As of 20 December 2010
