= Sebastien Chaule =

Germany international rugby union player

- Born: Sebastien Chaule; December 14, 1976 (age 49) Agen (France)
- Height: 1.81 m (5 ft 11 in)
- Weight: 95 kg (14 st 13 lb)
- School: College Jean Rostand
- Occupation: Chirurgische Operation Assistant

Rugby union career
- Position(s): Outside-Centre, Wing, Fullback
Amateur team(s)
Years	Team	Apps	(Points)
- Avenir Valencien
–	RG Heidelberg		
–	TSV Handschuhsheim		
–	Allgäu Rugby Kempten		
- Correct as of 6 March 2010
International career
Years	Team	Apps	(Points)
2004 - 2009	Germany	15	(55)
- Correct as of 6 March 2010

Sebastien Chaule (born 14 December 1976 in Agen) is a German international rugby union player, playing for the TSV Handschuhsheim until 2012 in the Rugby-Bundesliga and the German national rugby union team. His greatest success as a national team player was the promotion to Division 1 of the European Nations Cup in 2008.

He plays rugby since 1981 and originally hails from France. His usual position is outside-centre.

His last game for Germany was against Russia on 2 May 2009 in Hannover, his 15th international. He retired from international rugby after a controversial red card he received in a Bundesliga match in October 2009. Since 2012 his now playing for the Team Allgäu Rugby Kempten in the Bavarian division.

Chaule is a surgery Operation Assistant by profession

== Honours ==
=== Club ===
- German rugby union championship
  - Runners up: 2005, 2008
- German rugby union cup
  - Winner: 2005
- German rugby sevens championship
  - Winner: 2004, 2008

=== National team ===
- European Nations Cup - Division 2
  - Champions: 2008

== Stats ==
Sebastien Chaule's personal statistics in club and international rugby:

=== Club ===
Year	Club	Division	Games	Tries	Con	Pen	DG	Place
2008-09	TSV Handschuhsheim	Rugby-Bundesliga	8	3	0	0	0	6th
2009-10	TSV Handschuhsheim	Rugby-Bundesliga	13	3	0	0	0	4th — Semi-finals
2010-11	TSV Handschuhsheim	Rugby-Bundesliga	16	3	0	0	0	3rd — Semi-finals
2011-12	TSV Handschuhsheim	Rugby-Bundesliga	8	0	0	0	0	5th

- As of 30 April 2012

=== National team ===
==== European Nations Cup ====
Year	Team	Competition	Games	Points	Place
2006-2008	Germany	European Nations Cup Second Division	5	5	Champions
2008-2010	Germany	European Nations Cup First Division	1	0	6th — Relegated

==== Friendlies & other competitions ====
Year	Team	Competition	Games	Points
2007	Germany	Friendly	1	5

- As of 6 March 2010
