= Edmoore Takaendesa =

- Born: Edmoore Takaendesa; 11 November 1980 (age 46) Harare
- Height: 1.80 m (5 ft 11 in)
- Weight: 91 kg (14 st 5 lb)
- School: Prince Edward School Zimbabwe

Rugby union career
- Position: Fullback
Amateur team(s)
Years	Team	Apps	(Points)
- Old Hararians
–	RG Heidelberg		
–	RC Strasbourg		
- Correct as of 5 March 2010
International career
Years	Team	Apps	(Points)
2008 –2011	Germany	18	(55)
- Correct as of 5 March 2010

Edmoore Takaendesa (born 11 November 1980) is a German international rugby union player, playing for the RG Heidelberg in the Rugby-Bundesliga and the German national rugby union team.

He made his debut for Germany on 19 April 2008 against Ukraine.

Takaendesa originally hails from Zimbabwe, a country he last played for in 2000, after which he moved to Germany. In Zimbabwe, he played for Old Hararians. He was educated at the Prince Edward School there. He is one of a number of Zimbabweans that left their country to play rugby in Germany.

== Honours ==
=== National team ===
- European Nations Cup – Division 2
  - Champions: 2008

== Stats ==
Edmoore Takaendesa's personal statistics in club and international rugby:

=== Club ===
Year	Club	Division	Games	Tries	Con	Pen	DG	Place
2007–08	RG Heidelberg	Rugby-Bundesliga	14					2nd – Runners-up
2008–09	RG Heidelberg	Rugby-Bundesliga	16	1	0	0	0	5th
2009–10	RG Heidelberg	Rugby-Bundesliga	18	6	0	0	1	2nd – Semi-finals
2010–11	RG Heidelberg	Rugby-Bundesliga	12	3	0	0	0	4th – Semi-finals
2011–12	RG Heidelberg	Rugby-Bundesliga	9	1	0	0	0	6th

- Updated 30 April 2012

=== National team ===
==== European Nations Cup ====
Year	Team	Competition	Games	Points	Place
2006–2008	Germany	European Nations Cup Second Division	2	0	Champions
2008–2010	Germany	European Nations Cup First Division	7	0	6th – Relegated

==== Friendlies & other competitions ====
Year	Team	Competition	Games	Points
2008	Germany	Friendly	1	0

- Updated 5 March 2010
