= Benjamin Danso =

Germany international rugby union player

- Born: Benjamin Danso; 9 January 1984 (age 42)
- Height: 2.01 m (6 ft 7 in)
- Weight: 112 kg (17 st 9 lb)

Rugby union career
- Position: Lock
Senior career
Years	Team	Apps	(Points)
2005	Schwalbe		
2005 - 2009	DRC		
2009 - present	HRK	24	(0)
- Correct as of 11 May 2012
International career
Years	Team	Apps	(Points)
2006 - present	Germany	23	
- Correct as of 4 December 2013

Benjamin Danso (born 9 January 1984) is a German international rugby union player, playing for the Heidelberger RK in the Rugby-Bundesliga and the German national rugby union team.

Danso played in the 2011 and 2012 German championship final for Heidelberger RK, which the club both won.

He plays rugby since 2004. He originally played for the DRC Hannover in the Bundesliga but left the club after its relegation in 2009 to join Heidelberger RK. He made his debut for Germany in 2006 in a game against Switzerland. His final match was in 2016, in a test between Germany and Spain in Cologne.

== Honours ==
=== Club ===
- German rugby union championship
  - Champions: 2010, 2011, 2012, 2013
- German rugby union cup
  - Winners: 2006, 2011

=== National team ===
- European Nations Cup - Division 2
  - Champions: 2008

== Stats ==
Benjamin Danso's personal statistics in club and international rugby:

=== Club ===
Year	Club	Division	Games	Tries	Con	Pen	DG	Place
2008-09	DRC Hannover	Rugby-Bundesliga	9	3	0	0	0	9th — Relegated
2009-10	Heidelberger RK	Rugby-Bundesliga	0	0	0	0	0	3rd — Champions
2010-11	Heidelberger RK	Rugby-Bundesliga	7	0	0	0	0	1st — Champions
2011-12	Heidelberger RK	Rugby-Bundesliga	16	0	0	0	0	1st — Champions
2012-13	Heidelberger RK	Rugby-Bundesliga						1st — Champions
2013-14	Heidelberger RK	Rugby-Bundesliga						

- As of 4 December 2013

=== National team ===
==== European Nations Cup ====
Year	Team	Competition	Games	Points	Place
2006-2008	Germany	European Nations Cup Second Division	6	0	Champions
2008-2010	Germany	European Nations Cup First Division	2	0	6th — Relegated
2010–2012	Germany	European Nations Cup Division 1B	4	0	4th
2012–2014	Germany	European Nations Cup Division 1B	6	0	ongoing

==== Friendlies & other competitions ====
Year	Team	Competition	Games	Points
2007	Germany	Friendly	2	5
2008	Germany	Friendly	1	0

- As of 4 December 2013
