= Franck Moutsinga =

Germany international rugby union player

Franck Stephane Moutsinga
- Born: Franck Moutsinga; 12 August 1985 (age 41) Berlin, Germany
- Height: 1.71 m (5 ft 7 in)
- Weight: 79 kg (12 st 6 lb)

Rugby union career
- Position: Scrum-half
Amateur team(s)
Years	Team	Apps	(Points)
- Berliner RC
–	SC Siemenstadt		
–	Berliner RC		
–	Strasbourg		
–	Berliner RC		
International career
Years	Team	Apps	(Points)
2007	Germany	10	
- Correct as of 24 February 2009
National sevens team
Years	Team		Comps
- Germany 7's

Franck Moutsinga (born 12 August 1985) is a German international rugby union player, playing for the Berliner RC in the Rugby-Bundesliga and the German national rugby union team.

== Biography ==
Moutsinga started playing rugby for the Berliner Rugby Club when he was five years old, in 1990. He is currently playing for the Berliner Rugby Club, together with Gerrit van Look and Colin Grzanna, another two players of the German national team. Before playing in the German 1st XV and German Sevens Side, Moutsinga played two Under 19 World Championships in Italy (2002) and France (2003).

Playing for Berlin for the most part of his career, Moutsinga spent the 2005/06 season with the Racing Club Strasbourg in France (2nd Amateur League) before returning to Berlin again.

He was part of the German Sevens side at the World Games 2005 in Duisburg, where Germany finished 8th and played two tournaments of the IRB Sevens Series in 2006 in Paris (France) and London (England). During that two tournaments Moutsinga scored three tries, one of it in Twickenham Stadium. In his young age of 23 years, the scrum-half spent three final European Championships Tournaments in Moskau/Russia (2005 and 2007) and in Hannover (2008) with the Sevens Team of Germany. He was also again part of the team at the 2009 Hannover Sevens, the final-round of the European Sevens Championship 2009.

He was part of the German team at the 2009 London Sevens.

Moutsinga's last game for the German XV was a friendly against Switzerland in 2007. He also sat on the bench on three of Germany's European nations Cup matches in 2006–08, but was not used in any of them.

== Honours ==
=== National team ===
- European Nations Cup - Division 2
  - Champions: 2008

== Stats ==
Franck Moutsinga's personal statistics in club and international rugby:

=== Club ===
Year	Club	Division	Games	Tries	Con	Pen	DG	Place
2008-09	Berliner RC	Rugby-Bundesliga	16	5	0	0	0	4th — Semi-finals
2009-10	Berliner RC	Rugby-Bundesliga	13	2	0	0	0	6th
2010-11	Berliner RC	Rugby-Bundesliga	5	0	0	0	0	6th
2011-12	Berliner RC	Rugby-Bundesliga	6	0	0	0	0	9th

- As of 30 April 2012

=== National team ===
==== European Nations Cup ====
Year	Team	Competition	Games	Points	Place
2006-2008	Germany	European Nations Cup Second Division	1	0	Champions

==== Friendlies & other competitions ====
Year	Team	Competition	Games	Points
2007	Germany	Friendly	2	0

- As of 27 February 2010
