= Sascha Fischer =

German rugby union player (born 1971)

- Born: Sascha Fischer; 24 December 1971 (age 54) Stuttgart, West Germany
- Height: 2.08 m (6 ft 10 in)
- Weight: 115 kg (18 st 2 lb)

Rugby union career
- Position: Lock
Amateur team(s)
Years	Team	Apps	(Points)
- DSV 1878 Hannover
- Correct as of 15 March 2010
Senior career
Years	Team	Apps	(Points)
1996 – 2003	Bourgoin		
2003 – 2006	Périgueux		
2006 – 2009	Le Bugue		
International career
Years	Team	Apps	(Points)
2007	Germany	27	
- Correct as of 15 March 2010
National sevens team
Years	Team		Comps
- Germany 7's

Sascha Fischer (born 24 December 1971, in Stuttgart) is retired a German international rugby union player, having last played for Le Bugue athletic club in the Federale 1 and also the German national rugby union team.

He played his last game for Germany against Belgium on 10 November 2007.

He played professionally for CS Bourgoin-Jallieu in France, a club he played Heineken Cup and European Challenge Cup matches for.

== Honours ==
=== National team ===
- European Nations Cup - Division 2
  - Champions: 2008

== Stats ==
Sascha Fischer's personal statistics in club and international rugby:

=== Club ===
Year	Club	Division	Games	Tries	Con	Pen	DG	Place
2008–09	Le Bugue athletic club	Federale 1	17	0	0	0	0	

- As of 15 December 2010

=== National team ===
==== European Nations Cup ====
Year	Team	Competition	Games	Points	Place
2006–2008	Germany	European Nations Cup Second Division	1	0	Champions

==== Friendlies & other competitions ====
Year	Team	Competition	Games	Points
2007	Germany	Friendly	1	0

- As of 15 December 2010
