= Christian Baracat =

German rugby union player (born 1986)

- Born: Christian Baracat; 5 June 1986 (age 40)
- Height: 1.86 m (6 ft 1 in)
- Weight: 103 kg (16 st 3 lb)
- University: University of Mannheim Institut d'Études Politiques de Paris College of Europe
- Occupation: Account Executive

Rugby union career
- Position: Prop
Amateur team(s)
Years	Team	Apps	(Points)
- SC 1880 Frankfurt
–	PUC Paris		
–	SC Neuenheim		
–	Kituro		
- Correct as of 7 March 2010
International career
Years	Team	Apps	(Points)
2007–2008	Germany	5	(0)
- Correct as of 7 March 2010

Christian Baracat (born 5 June 1986) is a German international rugby union player, having played for the SC Neuenheim in the Rugby-Bundesliga and the German national rugby union team. He has played professional rugby since 1996.

Baracat made his debut for Germany on 29 September 2007 in friendly against Switzerland. He played five times for his country, his last game being against Spain on 15 November 2008. In the 2009–10 season, he was unable to play for Germany due to commitments in his studies. He was also unavailable for his club team as he was studying in Bruges, Belgium. As of 2012 he plays for Belgian club Kituro RC.

Baracat, who joined the SC Neuenheim from Paris Université Club, also played for SC 1880 Frankfurt before.

== Honours ==
=== Club ===
- German rugby union cup
  - Winners: 2007

=== National team ===
- European Nations Cup – Division 2
  - Champions: 2008

== Stats ==
Christian Baracat's personal statistics in club and international rugby:

=== Club ===
Year	Club	Division	Games	Tries	Con	Pen	DG	Place
2008–09	SC Neuenheim	Rugby-Bundesliga	10	0	0	0	0	3rd
2009–10	?							
2010–11	?							

- Updated 7 March 2010

=== National team ===
==== European Nations Cup ====
Year	Team	Competition	Games	Points	Place
2006–2008	Germany	European Nations Cup Second Division	2	0	Champions
2008–2010	Germany	European Nations Cup First Division	1	0	6th

==== Friendlies & other competitions ====
Year	Team	Competition	Games	Points
2007	Germany	Friendly	1	0
2008	Germany	Friendly	1	0

- Updated 7 March 2010
