= Arnold Landvoigt =

German rugby union player

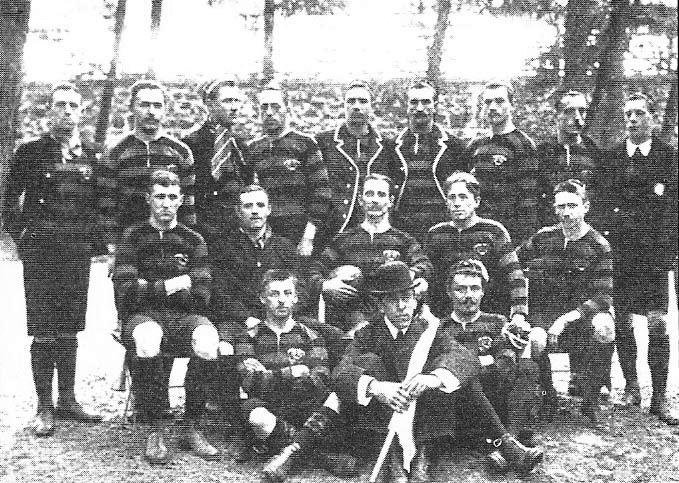
- Germany, represented by FC 1880 Frankfurt, at the 1900 Summer Olympics
- Full name: William Arnold Landvoigt
- Born: February 6, 1879 Washington, D.C., U.S.
- Died: December 15, 1970 (aged 91) Washington, D.C., U.S.

Rugby union career
- Position: Wing
Amateur team(s)
| Years | Team | Apps | (Points) |
- FC 1880 Frankfurt
Medal record
Men's rugby union
Representing Germany
Olympic Games
| Silver medal – second place | 1900 Paris | Team competition |

William Arnold Landvoigt (February 6, 1879 – December 15, 1970) was an American rugby union player who represented the German Empire in the 1900 Summer Olympics. He was a member of the German rugby union team, which won the silver medal. Germany was represented at the tournament by the FC 1880 Frankfurt rather than an official national team.
