= Bodo Sieber =

German rugby union player

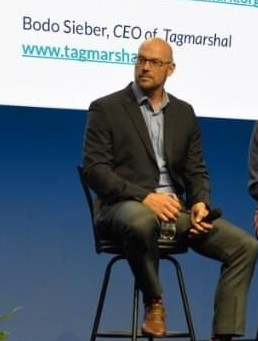
- Bodo Sieber - PGA Show Main stage 2023
- Born: Bodo Sieber; 10 January 1979 (age 47)
- Height: 1.97 m (6 ft 6 in)
- Weight: 114 kg (17 st 13 lb)
- Occupation(s): CEO and Co-Founder of Tagmarshal

Rugby union career
- Position: Lock
Amateur team(s)
Years	Team	Apps	(Points)
2000	SC Neuenheim		
2000 -	University of Cape Town RFC		
- Correct as of 3 March 2010
Senior career
Years	Team	Apps	(Points)
2005 - 2006	Cork Constitution		
–	Western Province		
International career
Years	Team	Apps	(Points)
1998-2010	Germany	23	
- Correct as of 21 March 2010
National sevens team
Years	Team		Comps
- Germany

Bodo Sieber (born 10 January 1979) is an entrepreneur, co-founder and CEO of Tagmarshal Golf Course Optimization Technology and previously co-founded Berlin-based platform for social causes called betterplace.org. Sieber is a former German international rugby union player, playing for the University of Cape Town RFC and the German national rugby union team.

Sieber has been a keynote speaker at the Golf Business Conference, Golf Inc Innovation Summit, PGA Show, Golf Business Tech Conference, as well as appearing in Forbes magazine, Golf.com, PGA Magazine, Compleat Golfer, and other leading industry publications, radio shows, and podcasts.

== Sports career ==
Born in 1979, Bodo Sieber grew up in the German city of Heidelberg, where he developed a lifelong passion for sports, with a focus on rugby, which he started playing for SC Neuenheim in 1993. By 1998, Sieber had played at two U19 World Cups (Chile/France) and made his debut playing for the German National Team, for which he earned 24 caps.

After relocating to Cape Town in 2000, Sieber joined the University of Cape Town RFC Ikey Tigers, where he played a record 172 first class games and captained the team. He played for Cork Constitution in the AIB League in 2005-06, as well as playing for Western Province in the Vodacom Cup for two seasons. He remains an Exco member of the UCT Ikey Tigers Rugby Club.

== Career highlights ==
- 2006: Co-founded Berlin based donation platform betterplace.org
- 2016: Co-founded Tagmarshal Golf course optimization technology platform
- 2022: Most Innovative Person in Golf (Golf Inc.)
- 2023: PGA Show - Keynote speaker
