= Steve Williams (rugby union, born 1982) =

Germany international rugby union player

- Born: Steve Williams; 5 October 1982 (age 44) Australia
- Height: 1.83 m (6 ft 0 in)
- Weight: 110 kg (17 st 5 lb; 243 lb)
- Occupation: Account executive

Rugby union career
- Position: Prop
Amateur team(s)
Years	Team	Apps	(Points)
- Wollongbar Alstonville Rugby
–	Mosman Rugby Club		
–	Garioch Rugby		
–	SC Neuenheim		
–	Mosman Rugby Club		
- Correct as of 5 March 2010
International career
Years	Team	Apps	(Points)
2007–2008	Germany	3	(0)
- Correct as of 5 March 2010

Steve Williams (born 5 October 1982) is an Australian-born German international rugby union player, having played for the SC Neuenheim and the German national rugby union team. He has also played club rugby at highest level in Scotland, the Netherlands and Portugal.

== Biography ==
Williams has been playing rugby since 1988, and hails from Alstonville, New South Wales. Williams qualified to play for Germany through his German mother and, after backpacking through Europe and watching Australia play in the 2007 Rugby World Cup, he had a trial for Germany, which he passed. He impressed Germany's director of rugby, Peter Ianusevici, enough to field him in Germany's next game.

He made his debut for Germany on 24 November 2007, three days after his trial, a 34–5 victory against Moldova in Heidelberg. He neither speaks German nor was he able to sing the German national anthem, but he indicated his willingness to learn both for the upcoming spring tests in early 2008. His debut for Germany however meant, he was not eligible to play for his native country Australia in the future, as the International Rugby Board allows a player to play for only one country.

Williams played three games for the team in the 2006-2008 European Nations Cup Second Division, his last on 26 April 2008, against the Netherlands, with Germany winning all three of them and securing promotion to the 2008-2010 European Nations Cup First Division.

After his stint in Europe and playing for Germany, he now again plays in Australia, for Mosman Rugby Club. He is a European and Business Studies student at Sydney's Macquarie University. Williams was supposed to play for SC Neuenheim in the 2008–09 Bundesliga season but, despite being confirmed by the club as a transfer, did not travel to Europe to play for the team.

== Honours ==
=== National team ===
- European Nations Cup – Division 2
  - Champions: 2008

== Stats ==
Steve Williams's personal statistics in club and international rugby:

=== National team ===
Year	Team	Competition	Games	Points	Place
2006–2008	Germany	European Nations Cup Second Division	3	0	Champions

- As of 5 March 2010
