= Lars Eckert =

- Born: Lars Eckert; November 24, 1983 (age 42)
- Height: 1.73 m (5 ft 8 in)
- Weight: 80 kg (12 st 8 lb; 176 lb)

Rugby union career
- Position: Fly-half
Senior career
Years	Team	Apps	(Points)
2004	RK 03		
2004 - present	SCN		
- Correct as of 4 March 2010
International career
Years	Team	Apps	(Points)
	Germany	29	
- Correct as of 28 April 2013

Lars Eckert (born 24 November 1983) is a German international rugby union player, playing for the SC Neuenheim in the Rugby-Bundesliga and the German national rugby union team.

He plays rugby since 1990. He played for RK 03 Berlin until 2004, when he joined SC Neuenheim.

He played his last game for Germany on 2 May 2009 against Russia.

In 2008-09, 2009–10 and 2010–11, he was his club's top point scorer.

== Honours ==
=== National team ===
- European Nations Cup - Division 2
  - Champions: 2008

== Stats ==
Lars Eckert's personal statistics in club and international rugby:

=== Club ===
Year	Club	Division	Games	Tries	Con	Pen	DG	Place
2008-09	SC Neuenheim	Rugby-Bundesliga	16	1	27	26	0	3rd — Semi-finals
2009-10	SC Neuenheim	Rugby-Bundesliga	10	2	19	9	0	5th
2010-11	SC Neuenheim	Rugby-Bundesliga	16	1	17	5	0	5th
2011-12	SC Neuenheim	Rugby-Bundesliga	18	0	5	1	0	4th — Semi-finals

- As of 30 April 2012

=== National team ===
==== European Nations Cup ====
Year	Team	Competition	Games	Points	Place
2006-2008	Germany	European Nations Cup Second Division	8	5	Champions
2008-2010	Germany	European Nations Cup First Division	4	0	6th — Relegated
2010–2012	Germany	European Nations Cup Division 1B	3	5	4th
2012–2014	Germany	European Nations Cup Division 1B	4	5	ongoing

==== Friendlies & other competitions ====
Year	Team	Competition	Games	Points
2007	Germany	Friendly	2	10
2008	Germany	Friendly	1	0

- As of 28 April 2013
