= Sven Wetzel =

German rugby union player

- Born: Sven Wetzel; 13 January 1987 (age 39)
- Height: 1.81 m (5 ft 11 in)
- Weight: 90 kg (14 st 2 lb; 198 lb)

Rugby union career
- Position: Hooker
Senior career
Years	Team	Apps	(Points)
2000 -	Handschuhsheim		
International career
Years	Team	Apps	(Points)
2010 -	Germany	3	(0)
- Correct as of 8 April 2012

Sven Wetzel (born 13 January 1987) is a German international rugby union player, playing for the TSV Handschuhsheim in the Rugby-Bundesliga and the German national rugby union team.

He made his debut for Germany in an ENC match against Poland on 20 November 2010.

== Stats ==
Sven Wetzel's personal statistics in club and international rugby:

=== Club ===
Year	Club	Division	Games	Tries	Con	Pen	DG	Place
2008-09	TSV Handschuhsheim	Rugby-Bundesliga	4	0	0	0	0	4th — Semi-finals
2009-10	TSV Handschuhsheim	Rugby-Bundesliga	17	3	0	0	0	6th
2010-11	TSV Handschuhsheim	Rugby-Bundesliga	17	7	0	0	0	3rd — Semi-finals
2011-12	TSV Handschuhsheim	Rugby-Bundesliga						

- As of 25 August 2011

=== National team ===
==== European Nations Cup ====
Year	Team	Competition	Games	Points	Place
2010–2012	Germany	European Nations Cup Division 1B	2	0	4th

==== Friendlies & other competitions ====
Year	Team	Competition	Games	Points
2010	Germany	Friendly	1	0

- As of 8 April 2012
