= Albert Amrhein =

German rugby union player

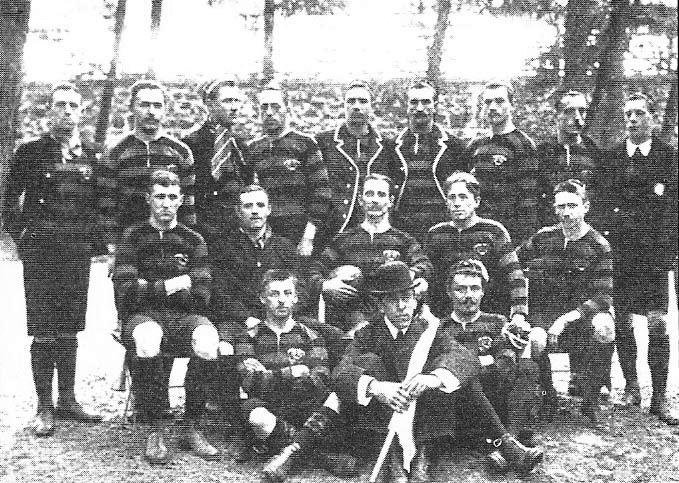
- Germany, represented by FC 1880 Frankfurt, at the 1900 Summer Olympics
- Full name: Franz Albert Amrhein
- Born: 29 December 1870 Frankfurt, North German Confederation
- Died: 20 May 1945 (aged 74) Frankfurt, Nazi Germany

Rugby union career
- Position: Number eight
Amateur team(s)
Years	Team	Apps	(Points)
- (German Empire) FC 1880 Frankfurt
Medal record
Men's rugby union
Representing Germany
Olympic Games
Silver medal – second place	1900 Paris	Team competition

Franz Albert Amrhein (29 December 1870 – 20 May 1945) was a German rugby union player who competed in the 1900 Summer Olympics. He was a member of the German rugby union team, which won the silver medal. Germany was represented at the tournament by the FC 1880 Frankfurt rather than an official national team. Amrhein was the captain of the Frankfurt team at the event.
