= Rudolf-Kalweit-Stadion =

Stadium in Hanover, Germany

Coordinates: 52°21′44″N 9°46′50″E

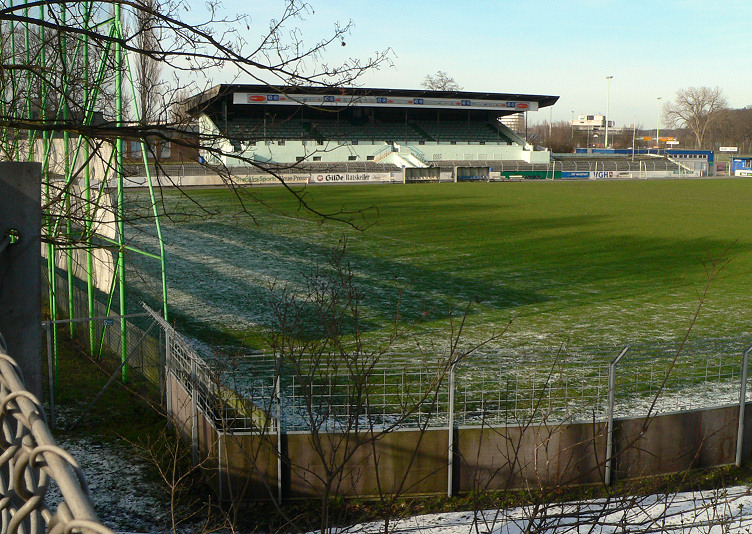
- Interactive map of Rudolf-Kalweit-Stadion
- Former names: Stadion Bischofsholer Damm
- Location: Hanover, Germany
- Owner: Arminia Hannover
- Capacity: 18,000
- Record attendance: 20,000

Construction
- Built: 1918
- Renovated: 1976

Tenants
- Arminia Hannover (Football); Hannover Spartans (American football); Germany (Rugby union)

The Rudolf-Kalweit-Stadion is an association football and rugby union stadium in Hanover, Germany. It is the home ground and owned by the football team Arminia Hannover and also frequently used for international games of the Germany national rugby union team. Additionally, the American football team Hannover Spartans also uses the ground.

In its 2008-2010 European Nations Cup First Division and in its 2014–16 European Nations Cup First Division campaign, Germany played one of its five home games at the stadium.

== History ==
Opened in 1918, it was formerly called the Stadion Bischofsholer Damm until 2005. The stadium is a purpose-built rectangular football stadium. The standing rank of the stadium behind one of the goals was pulled down in favour of a widening of the road behind it, the Bischofsholer Damm, in 1963. Arminia was asked to move their home ground for the road widening but declined. No flood lights are installed. The roof of the grand stand is actually from the Stadion Rote Erde, the former home ground of Borussia Dortmund, the roof having been moved to Hanover in 1976.

During the Second World War, the stadium was hit by three aerial bombs and was therefore unavailable for Arminia in the early post-war days.

In 2005, the stadium was renamed to its current name, in honour of long-term Arminia member Rudolf Kalweit.

With over 8,000 spectators, Germany's home game against the Netherlands at the stadium in April 2007 achieved the best crowd figures for a rugby match in Germany since the pre-Second World War days. The ground's record crowd was achieved in April 1960, when almost 20,000 people saw a 6–1 victory of Arminia versus the Bremer SV.
