= Michael Kerr (rugby union) =

- Born: 23 April 1974 (age 52)
- Height: 1.87 m (6 ft 2 in)
- Weight: 106 kg (16 st 10 lb)

Rugby union career
- Position: Flanker
Amateur team(s)
Years	Team	Apps	(Points)
- SC Neuenheim
–	Heidelberger TV		
–	RG Heidelberg		
- Correct as of 15 December 2010
International career
Years	Team	Apps	(Points)
2007	Germany		
- Correct as of 5 April 2010
- Rugby league career

Playing information
Representative
Years	Team	Pld	T	G	FG	P
2007	Germany	1

Michael Kerr (born 23 April 1974) is a German international rugby union player, playing for the RG Heidelberg in the Rugby-Bundesliga and the Germany national rugby union team. He is originally from New Zealand and qualified to play for Germany after five years of residence in the country.

He made his last game for Germany against a Welsh Districts XV on 24 February 2007. He has also played for the Germany national rugby league team in 2007, being threatened with a ban by the German rugby union coach if he did so.

Kerr, the nephew of the late Bruce Kerr, a legendary player and coach of SC Neuenheim also played for this club, but missed the 2008–09 season because of a back injury. For the 2009–10 season, he moved to the Heidelberger TV, a team just relegated from the 2nd Rugby-Bundesliga, to help the club return to the second division.

== Stats ==
Michael Kerr's personal statistics in club and international rugby:

=== Club ===
Year	Club	Division	Games	Tries	Con	Pen	DG	Place
2008-09	SC Neuenheim	Rugby-Bundesliga	0	0	0	0	0	3rd — Semi-finals
2009–10	Heidelberger TV	Rugby-Regionalliga						
2010-11	RG Heidelberg	Rugby-Bundesliga	1	0	0	0	0	4th — Semi-finals

- As of 25 August 2011

=== National team ===
Year	Team	Competition	Games	Points
2007	Germany	Friendly	1	5

- As of 5 April 2010
