= Krzysztof Hotowski =

Polish rugby union player

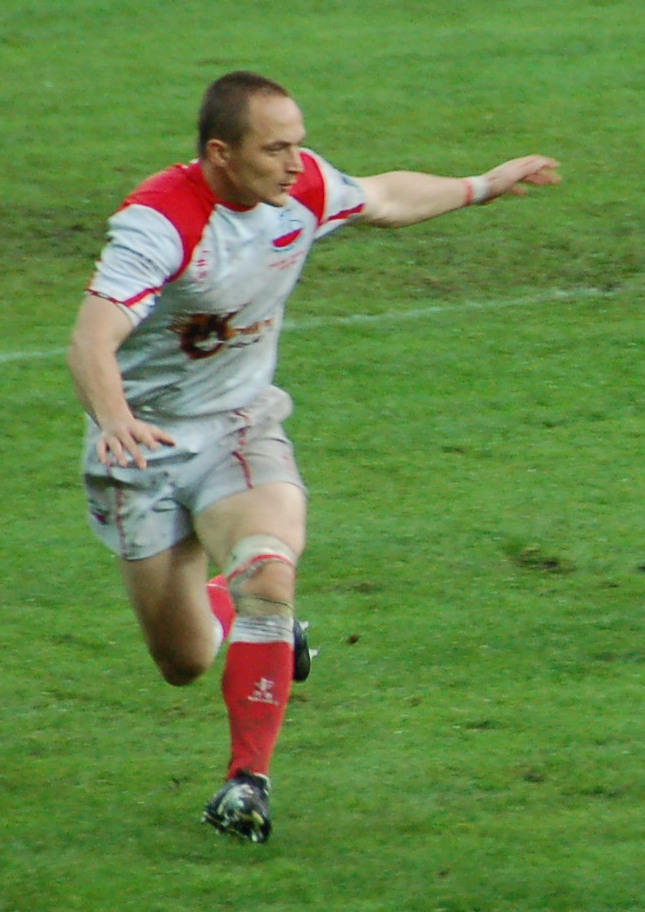
- Krzysztof Hotowski in 2009.
- Born: 25 November 1981 (age 44) Zgierz, Poland
- Height: 1.84 m (6 ft 0 in)
- Weight: 90 kg (198 lb; 14 st 2 lb)

Rugby union career
- Position(s): Wing; Centre
Provincial / State sides
Years	Team	Apps	(Points)
- USON Nevers Rugby
International career
Years	Team	Apps	(Points)
2002–present	Poland	42	(125)
- Correct as of 18 June 2013

Krzysztof Hotowski (born 25 November 1981 in Zgierz, Poland) is a Polish rugby union player who plays as a wing or centre.
