= SC Neuenheim =

German rugby union club, based in Heidelberg

(Germany) SC Neuenheim
- Full name: Sportclub Neuenheim 02 e.V.
- Union: German Rugby Federation
- Founded: 1902; 124 years ago
- Location: Heidelberg, Germany
- Ground: Museumsplatz an der Tiergartenstraße (Capacity: 3,000)
- Chairman: Peter Jeffs
- Coach(es): Lars Eckert & Uwe Schwager
- Captain: Michael Wiegandt
- League: Rugby-Bundesliga
- 2015–16: Rugby-Bundesliga South/West, 4th
Team kit

Official website
- www.scneuenheim.com/home/

The SC Neuenheim is a German rugby union club from Heidelberg, currently playing in the Rugby-Bundesliga. Having won nine men's and twelve women's German championships as of 2013, the club is one of the most accomplished in Germany.

== History ==
Formed in 1902, the club is the second-oldest rugby club in Heidelberg, one of the two centres of German rugby (the other being Hannover). Fußballclub Heidelberg-Neuenheim, the club's original name, was formed in the Neuenheim suburb of Heidelberg. Their first two titles were achieved still under this name, including winning its first German championship in 1912.

In 1923, the club changed its name to SC Neuenheim since the term football club did not reflect its orientation any more.

The club developed to become the most victorious rugby club in Heidelberg, collecting a large number of titles in men's and women's rugby. It prides itself as the biggest rugby club in Germany in regards to membership.

With the interception of the Rugby-Bundesliga in 1971, SCN fell behind other clubs, especially the strong clubs from Hannover. After 28 years without a championship, the club pulled off a surprise win over TSV Victoria Linden in the 1995 final, beating the favourite 14-13 in extra time.

Another surprise championship came in 2003, when DRC Hannover, winner of the previous five championships, could be beaten 18-6. The year after the club won its last men's championship to date, defeating DRC once more.

In 2006, in the first ever all-Heidelberg final, it lost to RG Heidelberg 9-13.

In 2007, it finished fourth in the league, three points outside the finals ranks. The season after, only a fifth place could be achieved and the SCN was well clear of the top-two positions in points.

The club improved in 2008-09, having hired a new coach for this purpose, finishing third in the league and reaching the semi-finals in the championship, where it went out to Heidelberger RK in extra time. It took until 2011-12 to finish in the top four again and reach the post season. The club was however outclassed in its semi-final and lost 71-21 to regular season champions Heidelberger RK. At the end of the season the contract with coach Mark Kuhlmann was not extended.

SCN finished first in their group in the 2012-13 season and qualified for the south/west division of the championship round, where it also came first. The club advanced to the German championship final where it lost 41-10 to Heidelberger RK. In 2013–14 the team qualified for the championship and the play-offs once more, losing to DSV 78 Hannover in the quarter-finals.

In the 2014–15 season the club finished third in the south-west championship group and was knocked out by TV Pforzheim in the semi-finals of the play-offs after a victories over Hamburger RC and DSV 78 Hannover.

Its reserve side joint with Heidelberger TV in the 2nd Bundesliga to form SG Heidelberger TV/SC Neuenheim II for 2008-09. Since 2009-10 the reserve side played in the Regional League.

== Club honours ==
=== Men ===
- German rugby union championship
  - Champions: 1912, 1921, 1924, 1949, 1966, 1967, 1995, 2003, 2004
  - Runners up: 1914, 1923, 1936, 1939, 1950, 1951, 1954, 1958, 1961, 1962, 1972, 1990, 2001, 2006, 2013
- German rugby union cup
  - Winner: 1964, 1975, 1988, 1994, 1999, 2001, 2016
  - Runners up: 1991, 1992, 1995, 1998, 2002, 2010
- German sevens championship
  - Champions: 1996
  - Runners up: 1997, 1998, 2010

=== Women ===
- German rugby union championship
  - Champions: 1988, 1989, 1990 1991, 1992, 1993, 1996, 1997, 1998, 1999, 2004, 2009
  - Runners up: 1994, 1995, 2000, 2001, 2005, 2008, 2010, 2011, 2013, 2014, 2015, 2016
- German sevens championship
  - Champions: 2007, 2014
  - Runners up: 2003, 2004, 2005, 2008, 2009, 2010, 2012, 2013

== Men - Recent seasons ==
Recent seasons of the club:

Year	Division	Position
1997-98	Rugby-Bundesliga (I)	2nd
1998-99	Rugby-Bundesliga South/West	2nd
1998-99	Bundesliga championship round	3rd
1999–2000	Rugby-Bundesliga South/West	2nd
1999–2000	Bundesliga championship round	3rd
2000-01	Rugby-Bundesliga South/West	2nd
2000-01	Bundesliga championship round	1st — Runners up
2001-02	Rugby-Bundesliga	3rd
2002-03	Rugby-Bundesliga	2nd — Champions
2003-04	Rugby-Bundesliga	1st — Champions
2004-05	Rugby-Bundesliga	4th
2005-06	Rugby-Bundesliga	2nd — Runners up
2006-07	Rugby-Bundesliga	4th
2007-08	Rugby-Bundesliga	5th
2008-09	Rugby-Bundesliga	3rd — Semi-finals
2009–10	Rugby-Bundesliga	5th
2010–11	Rugby-Bundesliga	5th
2011–12	Rugby-Bundesliga	4th — Semi-finals
2012–13	Rugby-Bundesliga qualification round – South	2nd
2012–13	Rugby-Bundesliga championship round – South-West	2nd — Runners up
2013–14	Rugby-Bundesliga qualification round – South	5th
2013–14	Rugby-Bundesliga championship round – South-West	3rd — Quarter finals
2014–15	Rugby-Bundesliga qualification round – South	4th
2014–15	Rugby-Bundesliga championship round – South-West	3rd — Semi finals
2015–16	Rugby-Bundesliga South-West	4th

- Until 2001, when the single-division Bundesliga was established, the season was divided in autumn and spring, a Vorrunde and Endrunde, whereby the top teams of the Rugby-Bundesliga would play out the championship while the bottom teams together with the autumn 2nd Bundesliga champion would play for Bundesliga qualification. The remainder of the 2nd Bundesliga teams would play a spring round to determine the relegated clubs. Where two placing's are shown, the first is autumn, the second spring. In 2012 the Bundesliga was expanded from ten to 24 teams and the 2nd Bundesliga from 20 to 24 with the leagues divided into four regional divisions.

== Rugby internationals ==
In Germany's 2006–08 European Nations Cup campaign, Lars Eckert, Marten Strauch, Klaus Mainzer, Marcus Trick, Steve Williams, Christian Hug and Michael Kerr were called up for the national team.

In the 2008–10 campaign, Eckert, Strauch and Trick all appeared for the SCN and Germany again, while Udo Schwarz, Shalva Didebashvili and Christian Baracat were new additions to the club's list of internationals.

In the 2010–12 campaign, only Marten Strauch and Lars Eckert were selected to play for Germany.

For the opening match of the 2012–14 edition of the ENC against Ukraine the club had only Lars Eckert re-selected for the team while Pascal Drügemöller was a new edition to the club's list of German internationals.

The club had one player selected for the German under-18 team at the 2009 European Under-18 Rugby Union Championship, Pascal Drügemöller. Drügemöller also played at the 2010 tournament.

== Women - Recent seasons ==
Year	Division	Position
2000-01	Women's Rugby Bundesliga (I)	2nd — Runners up
2001-02	Women's Rugby Bundesliga	2nd
2002-03	Women's Rugby Bundesliga	3rd
2003-04	Women's Rugby Bundesliga	1st — Champions
2004-05	Women's Rugby Bundesliga	2nd — Runners up
2005-06	Women's Rugby Bundesliga	4th
2006-07	Women's Rugby Bundesliga	4th
2007-08	Women's Rugby Bundesliga	2nd — Runners up
2008-09	Women's Rugby Bundesliga	1st — Champions
2009-10	Women's Rugby Bundesliga	2nd — Runners up
2010–11	Women's Rugby Bundesliga	2nd — Runners up
2011–12	Women's Rugby Bundesliga	2nd
2012–13	Women's Rugby Bundesliga	2nd — Runners up
2013–14	Women's Rugby Bundesliga	1st — Runners up
2014–15	Women's Rugby Bundesliga	2nd — Runners up
2015–16	Women's Rugby Bundesliga	1st — Runners up
