= DRC Hannover =

German rugby union club, based in Hannover

(Germany) DRC Hannover
- Full name: Deutscher Rugby Club Hannover
- Union: German Rugby Federation
- Founded: 1905; 121 years ago
- Location: Hannover, Germany
- Ground: Rugbyplatz an der Beeke (Capacity: 1,500)
- Chairman: Thomas Schmidt
- Coach: (United Kingdom) George Kenrick
- Captain: Alexander Luft
- League: 2. Rugby-Bundesliga (II)
- 2015–16: 2. Rugby-Bundesliga North, 5th
Team kit

Official website
- www.rugby-drc.de

The DRC Hannover is a German rugby union club from Hannover, currently playing in the Rugby-Regionalliga. The club should not be confused with the DRC 1884 Hannover, a rowing club and a separate entity.

== History ==
The club was formed in 1905 in the Hannover suburb of Ricklingen.

The club did not really make an impact on the German rugby scene for the first 80 years of its history, facing strong opposition within Hannover, one of the two centres of German rugby.

A German rugby union cup finals appearance in 1981 was the first time it reached a national final. In 1988, after beating local rival DSV 1878 Hannover 12-9 in the final, the club took out its first national championship. After this, it did not appear in a final again for another ten years.

The DRC's great era begun in 1997, when it started to dominate the Bundesliga. The club managed to reach every championship final from 1998 to 2005, winning six out of the eight. The 2001-02 season was the only one ever played were there wasn't a final; the regular season champion also became the national one.

In 2005-06, the club missed out on the final by having lost both regular season games to second-placed SC Neuenheim, being on equal points with the club. This meant, for the first time in the history of the German championship, no club from Hannover played in the final. the following season, the club came third again, missing out on the final by two points to the RG Heidelberg. After this, the DRC fell into decline.

On the last day of the 2007-08 season, the club performed a miracle, beating top of the table side SC 1880 Frankfurt, who had previously only lost one game this season, and securing their Bundesliga survival for another year. The club managed to reach seventh place, ahead of RK Heusenstamm. In the promotion/relegation round, the club then easily beat ASV Köln Rugby despite having only 18 players available and assured that the Rugby-Bundesliga would still have a club from Hannover next season.

The 2008-09 season saw the club struggle even more and finish last in the table, without a win. DRC decided not to play the relegation final against RK 03 Berlin and to accept direct relegation instead. The club's reserve side played in the 2nd Bundesliga in 2008-09, having joined up with SC Schwalbe to form SG Schwalbe/DRC Hannover II.

A league reform in 2012 allowed the club promotion to the Bundesliga as the league was expanded from ten to 24 teams. The club however did not field a team in the opening game of the new season and instead withdrew from the league altogether. The club was able to gain admittance instead to the tier three Regionalliga, despite the season already being underway. The reasons for the voluntary withdrawal was that DRC had, in its more successful days, neglected its youth program and had a number of players fail or were unable to appear for the opening match of the Bundesliga.

The club bounced back, winning its Regionalliga division and returning to the 2nd Bundesliga for 2013–14. The club qualified for the DRV-Pokal, but finished last in the north-east division and missed out on the play-offs. In the 2014–15 season, the club finished third in the north-east Liga-Pokal group, but was knocked out by Neckarsulmer SU in the first round of the play-offs after a 45–7 loss.

== Club honours ==
=== Men ===
- German rugby union championship
  - Champions: 1988, 1998, 1999, 2000, 2001, 2002, 2005
  - Runners up: 2003, 2004
- German rugby union cup
  - Winner: 2002, 2003, 2006
  - Runners up: 1981, 1986, 1997, 2004, 2005
- German sevens championship
  - Runners up: 1999

=== Women ===
- German rugby union championship
  - Champions: 2002
  - Runners up: 1991, 1993

== Recent seasons ==
Recent seasons of the club:

Year	Division	Position
1997-98	Rugby-Bundesliga (I)	3rd — Champions
1998-99	Rugby-Bundesliga North/East	1st
1998-99	Bundesliga championship round	1st — Champions
1999-2000	Rugby-Bundesliga North/East	1st
1999-2000	Bundesliga championship round	1st — Champions
2000-01	Rugby-Bundesliga North/East	1st
2000-01	Bundesliga championship round	2nd — Champions
2001-02	Rugby-Bundesliga	1st — Champions
2002-03	Rugby-Bundesliga	1st — Runners up
2003-04	Rugby-Bundesliga	2nd — Runners up
2004-05	Rugby-Bundesliga	1st - Champions
2005-06	Rugby-Bundesliga	3rd
2006-07	Rugby-Bundesliga	3rd
2007-08	Rugby-Bundesliga	7th
2008-09	Rugby-Bundesliga	9th — Relegated
2009–10	2nd Rugby-Bundesliga North/East (II)	7th
2010–11	2nd Rugby-Bundesliga North/East	7th
2011–12	2nd Rugby-Bundesliga North/East	5th — Relegated
2012–13	Rugby-Regionalliga Nord (III)	1st
2013–14	2nd Rugby-Bundesliga qualification round – North	2nd
2013–14	DRV-Pokal – North-East	8th
2014–15	2nd Rugby-Bundesliga qualification round – North	5th
2014–15	Liga-Pokal – North-East	5th –First round
2015–16	2nd Rugby-Bundesliga North	5th

- Until 2001, when the single-division Bundesliga was established, the season was divided in autumn and spring, a Vorrunde and Endrunde, whereby the top teams of the Rugby-Bundesliga would play out the championship while the bottom teams together with the autumn 2nd Bundesliga champion would play for Bundesliga qualification. The remainder of the 2nd Bundesliga teams would play a spring round to determine the relegated clubs. Where two placing's are shown, the first is autumn, the second spring. In 2012 the Bundesliga was expanded from ten to 24 teams and the 2nd Bundesliga from 20 to 24 with the leagues divided into four regional divisions.

== Rugby internationals ==
In Germany's 2006–08 European Nations Cup campaign, Benjamin Danso and Timur Tekkal were called up for the national team.

In the 2008–10 campaign, Danso appeared for the DRC and Germany again but left the club at the end of the 2008-09 season to join Heidelberger RK.

Semesa Rokoduguni, who played for DRC while stationed in Germany with the British Army made his debut for England in an international against New Zealand in November 2014.

== Coaches ==
Recent coaches of the club:

Name	Period
Torsten Schippe	1993 - 2003
Mark Kuhlmann	2008
(United Kingdom) George Kenrick	2008–present
