= Murray Archibald =

Scottish footballer

Personal information
- Full name: John Murray Archibald
- Date of birth: 19 March 1917
- Place of birth: Carron, Falkirk, Scotland
- Date of death: 9 January 2006 (aged 88)
- Place of death: Falkirk, Scotland
- Position: Forward

Senior career*
Years	Team	Apps	(Gls)
- Bangor City
1946–1947	Wrexham	1	(0)
- * Club domestic league appearances and goals

John Murray Archibald (19 March 1917 – 9 January 2006) was a Scottish professional footballer, who played as a forward. He made one appearance in the English Football League for Wrexham in the 1946–47 season.
