= SC 1880 Frankfurt =

German rugby union club, based in Frankfurt am Main

(Germany) SC 1880 Frankfurt
- Full name: Sport-Club Frankfurt 1880 e.V.
- Union: German Rugby Federation
- Founded: 1880; 146 years ago
- Location: Frankfurt am Main, Germany
- Ground: Sportanlage an der Feldgerichtstrasse
- Chairman: Uwe H.H. Benecke
- Coach: Byron Schmidt
- Captain: Leo Wolf
- League: Rugby-Bundesliga
- 2022–23: Rugby-Bundesliga South/West, 1st (champions)
Team kit

Official website
- www.sc1880.de

The Sport-Club Frankfurt 1880 e.V. (or SC 1880 Frankfurt) is a German sports club from Frankfurt am Main. The club is mainly known for its rugby union team, which currently plays in the Rugby-Bundesliga, the highest level of the league system for rugby union in Germany. Apart from rugby, the club hosts other sports such as athletics, curling, field hockey, lacrosse, and tennis.

The club is one of four professional rugby clubs in Germany. The turn to professionalism in a sport otherwise fully amateur in Germany was made possible through the support of Uli Byszio, who owns a gold- and silver trading business. The club became an amateur side once more after the 2012–13 season.

== History ==
The SC 1880 was formed in 1880 as a rugby club through the merger of two local rugby sides, "Germania" and "Franconia". It was formed as "FC 1880 Frankfurt" as a distinction between rugby and football was not made in Germany at that time.

Rugby quickly gained in popularity at that time and Frankfurt became the first German team to travel to England, playing the Blackheath Football Club in 1894. Blackheath awarded the club the right to adopt its club colours of red and black, which are still the colours SC 1880 plays in today. In 1905, a field hockey département was established, and in 1914 the club changed its name to the current SC 1880 Frankfurt. Before that, in 1910, the club won its first national rugby title, winning the second edition of the German rugby union championship. In 1913, it repeated this achievement. The club also represented Germany at the 1900 World Expo in Paris, which was part of the rugby tournament of the 1900 Summer Olympics. The club thereby achieved Germany's only rugby medal at Olympic games to date.

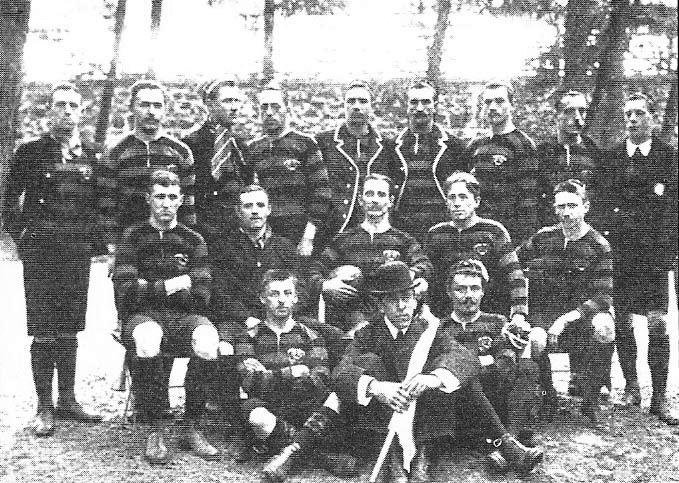
Germany, represented by SC 1880 Frankfurt, at the 1900 Summer Olympics

In 1922–23, the club moved to its current home ground. In this era, two more national titles followed, in 1922 and 1925. In 1926 and 1931, the SC 1880 reached the final but lost. Before and after the war, the club played regular friendlies with the Oxford Greyhounds and after the Second World War the club travelled to Oxford in 1951 and had the English team return the visit in 1953.

Success on the rugby field was limited after this and a losing appearances in the 1952 and 1969 finals was all it had to show for.

With the establishment of the Rugby-Bundesliga in 1971, SC 1880 seems to have lost completely in importance and the new millennium found the club as a struggling second division outfit, having been relegated from the Rugby-Bundesliga in 1999. After suffering relegation from the second division in 2004, the club quickly rebounded and returned to this level the season after. With the help of foreign players and coaches, the fortunes of the club turned after this. A large part of the success of the club hails from the financial support of Uli Byszio, a former player, who led the way in professionalising the club.

In the 2005–06 season, the club earned promotion to the Rugby-Bundesliga by winning the 2nd Bundesliga South/West and then defeating RK 03 Berlin, the North/East champion, 39–5.

Upon return to the Bundesliga, the club performed impressively, finishing the 2006–07 season with twelve wins, one draw and one loss on top of the table. In the final however, played at home, the team slipped up and lost to the RG Heidelberg 15–23.

The following season, 2007–08, the team finished on top again and this time it fared better in the final, beating RG Heidelberg 28–13 to win its fifth German title and its first in 83 years, having last won it in 1925. With Villiame Gadolo, the club had a player with Rugby World Cup experience in its ranks. Due to the large number of New Zealanders in the side, the team actually performed the Haka before the match.

Shortly before winning the title, coach George Simpkin left the club and was replaced by Phil "Lofty" Stevenson, who was also, at the time, Germany's sevens coach. The team nevertheless continued in 2008–09 as it had finished the previous season, dominating the league and finishing on top, with 14 wins and two losses, while its reserve side won the 2nd Bundesliga South/West title. The senior team then moved on to beat Berliner Rugby Club in the semi-finals of the German championship, to reach the national title game against Heidelberger RK. An 11–8 victory over HRK earned the club its sixth German championship.

Throughout its history, the SC 1880 provided 36 players to the German national rugby union team who won 142 caps between them. In 2008, the club had players from more than 20 different nations in its ranks and its first three teams play at first, second and third level in the German league system. While the club only provided one player to the German team in 2008, Rolf Wacha, it was expected that Frankfurt's professional approach to rugby was going to improve this situation; great progress has been made in the youth département of the club in this regard. The club's concept envisions that by 2014 the whole first team will hail from the youth département and replace the need for foreign top-players.

In the 2009–10 season, Frankfurt took out the minor premiership once more, for a fourth time in a row, but lost the final in extra time to Heidelberger RK. The following year, Frankfurt reached the final for a fifth consecutive time but lost 9–12. After two lost finals in a row, the club decided to replace its coach, with Sam Alatini taking over from Aaron Satchwell for 2011–12, a move that proved unsuccessful with Frankfurt losing in the semi-finals at home to newly promoted TV Pforzheim.

In 2011–12, the club also took part in the North Sea Cup, a European Cup competition made up of two clubs each from Belgium, Germany and the Netherlands. While unsuccessful at national level the club did win the North Sea Cup with a 26–19 victory over Heidelberger RK.

SC 1880 finished first in their group in the 2012–13 season and qualified for the south/west division of the championship round, where it also came fifth. The club was knocked out in the quarter-finals of the play-offs after a 7–49 loss to Heidelberger RK. At the end of the season, the club opted to return to an amateur side, thereby being forced to withdraw its reserve team from the 2nd Bundesliga to the 3rd Liga because of a reduction of the size of the playing squad. Previously, the club's reserve side had played for many years in the 2nd Bundesliga South/West, where it has won the league championship in 2009 and 2012.

SC 1880 was less competitive in 2013–14 and 2014–15 then it had been in the recent past, finishing only seventh in each season the championship round and missing out on the play-off altogether. In the 2015-2016 season this improved to 6th position and also included a run to the semifinal of the DRV Pokal where they were defeated 10-21 by TSV Handshusheim. Carrying this momentum into the upcoming 2016-2017 season the club are optimistic that they will be in a position to challenge for silverware again at the end season.

In the 2015–16 season, SC1880's U12, U14, U16 and U18 teams each won their German age-group championship. Departing head of rugby Tim Matawatu described the four titles together as a "Grand Slam"

== Current squad ==
SC 1880 Frankfurt Squad for the 2026/27 season
Props: (Germany) Cosmos Zymvragos; (Germany) Daniel Wolf; (Germany) Chris Howells; (France) Sami Mavinga; (Germany) Christophe Edene; (Germany) Max Platte; Hookers: (Germany) Elias Haase; (Georgia (country)) David Khomeriki; Second Rows: (Germany) Hassan Rayan; (Germany) Carlos Heil; (Germany) Jens Listmann; (Germany) Lennart Arold; (Germany) Josef Dethleffsen; (Germany) Karl Stawowy	Backrow: (Germany) Oliver Stein; (Germany) Vinzenz Maier; (Germany) Johan Niederberger; (Germany) Richard Riddoch; (New Zealand) Kobe Atamu Anitelea; (Italy) Hermes Viazzi; (Germany) Nicolas Kaufholz; (Germany) Jacobus Otto; (France) Louis Martre; Scrum-halves: (Japan) Yoshihiro Furuoka; (France) Quentin Micolot; (Germany) Arthur Maier; (Germany) Emil Gempp; Fly-halves: (Germany) Oliver Paine; (Germany) Lukas Deichmann	Centres: (Germany) Leo Wolf (c); (Germany) Anton Rupf; (Germany) Sebastian Rodwell; (Germany) Makonnen Amekuedi; (Germany) Rick Byszio; (Germany) Lando Becker; (England) Zoriah Dryden; Wingers: (Germany) Aidan Dixon; (Germany) Jack Byszio; (Germany) Franziskus Schröter; (Italy) Fabrizio Cabrera; (Germany) Severin Zirbes; (Germany) Clemens Hennig; Fullbacks: (Germany) Edoardo Stella; (South Africa) Zephyr Noah Smith; (Germany) Tung Cin Mang Thang

== Club honours ==
=== Rugby ===
The club's honours:

- German rugby union championship
  - Champions: 1910, 1913, 1922, 1925, 2008, 2009, 2019, 2022, 2023, 2024
  - Runners up: 1920, 1926, 1931, 1952, 1969, 2007, 2010, 2011
- German rugby union cup
  - Winner: 2007, 2009, 2010
  - Runners up: 2011
- German sevens championship
  - Champions: 2007, 2010
  - Runners up: 2008
- 2nd Rugby-Bundesliga
  - Champions: 2006, 2009^{‡}, 2012^{‡}
  - Division champions: 2006, 2009^{‡}, 2012^{‡}
- North Sea Cup
  - Winner: 2012
- ^{‡} Denotes won by reserve team.

=== Field hockey ===
==== Men ====
German national title: 3

- 1968–69, 1969–70, 1988–89

EuroHockey Club Champions Cup: 2

- 1974, 1975

==== Women ====
German national title: 2

- 1987–88, 1988–89

== Recent seasons ==
Recent seasons of the club:

=== First team ===
Year	Division	Position
1998–99		
1998–99	Bundesliga qualification round	6th
1999–2000	2nd Rugby-Bundesliga South/West (II)	6th
1999–2000	2nd Rugby-Bundesliga South/West qualification round	3rd
2000–01	2nd Rugby-Bundesliga South/West	5th
2000–01	2nd Rugby-Bundesliga South/West qualification round	2nd
2001–02	2nd Rugby-Bundesliga South/West	4th
2002–03	2nd Rugby-Bundesliga South/West	6th
2003–04	2nd Rugby-Bundesliga South/West	8th — Relegated
2004–05	Rugby-Regionalliga Hesse (III)	Promoted
2005–06	2nd Rugby-Bundesliga South/West (II)	1st — Promoted
2006–07	Rugby-Bundesliga (I)	1st — Runners up
2007–08	Rugby-Bundesliga	1st — Champions
2008–09	Rugby-Bundesliga	1st — Champions
2009–10	Rugby-Bundesliga	1st — Runners up
2010–11	Rugby-Bundesliga	2nd — Runners up
2011–12	Rugby-Bundesliga	2nd — Semi-finals
2012–13	Rugby-Bundesliga qualification round – West	1st
2012–13	Rugby-Bundesliga championship round – South-West	5th — Quarter finals
2013–14	Rugby-Bundesliga qualification round – West	2nd
2013–14	Rugby-Bundesliga championship round – South-West	7th
2014–15	Rugby-Bundesliga qualification round – West	2nd
2014–15	Rugby-Bundesliga championship round – South-West	7th
2015–16	Rugby-Bundesliga South-West	6th

- Until 2001, when the single-division Bundesliga was established, the season was divided in autumn and spring, a Vorrunde and Endrunde, whereby the top teams of the Rugby-Bundesliga would play out the championship while the bottom teams together with the autumn 2nd Bundesliga champion would play for Bundesliga qualification. The remainder of the 2nd Bundesliga teams would play a spring round to determine the relegated clubs. Where two placing's are shown, the first is autumn, the second spring. In 2012 the Bundesliga was expanded from ten to 24 teams and the 2nd Bundesliga from 20 to 24 with the leagues divided into four regional divisions.

=== Reserve team ===
Year	Division	Position
2001–02	Rugby-Regionalliga Hesse (III)	3rd
2002–03	Rugby-Regionalliga Hesse	7th
2003–04	Rugby-Regionalliga Hesse	4th
2004–05		
2005–06	Rugby-Regionalliga Hesse	1st — Promoted
2006–07	2nd Rugby-Bundesliga South/West (II)	3rd
2007–08	2nd Rugby-Bundesliga South/West	4th
2008–09	2nd Rugby-Bundesliga South/West	1st
2009–10	2nd Rugby-Bundesliga South/West	5th
2010–11	2nd Rugby-Bundesliga South/West	7th
2011–12	2nd Rugby-Bundesliga South/West	1st
2012–13	2nd Rugby-Bundesliga qualification round – West	6th
2012–13	Liga-Pokal – South-West	8th — Round of sixteen
2013–14	3rd Liga South/West — West division	5th
2014–15	3rd Liga South/West	7th
2015–16	3rd Liga South/West—South	3rd

== Rugby internationals ==
In Germany's 2006–08 European Nations Cup campaign, Christian Baracat and Rolf Wacha were called up for the national team.

In the 2008–10 campaign, Wacha appeared for 80 and Germany again, while Benjamin Brierley, Jamie Houston, Daniel Preussner, Alexander Hauck and Mark Sztyndera were new additions to the club's list of internationals.

In the 2010–12 campaign, Mark Sztyndera and Alexander Hauck were re-selected for the German team while Jannis Läpple, Keiran Manawatu and Sam Henderson made their debut.

For the opening match of the 2012–14 edition of the ENC against Ukraine the club had only Kieran Manawatu selected for the team.

The club had no player selected for the German under-18 team at the 2009 European Under-18 Rugby Union Championship, but three for the 2010 tournament, Lukas Deichmann, Jens Listmann and Adam Howes.

== Coaches ==
Recent coaches of the club:

Name	Period
(New Zealand) Lofty Stevenson	– 2009
(New Zealand) Aaron Satchwell	2009 – 2011
(Tonga) Sam Alatini	2011 – 2012
Daniel Cünzer	2012 – 2015
Karl Savimaki	2015 – 2017
