= 2009–10 Rugby-Bundesliga =

Rugby tournament

- Countries: Germany; Luxembourg
- Champions: Heidelberger RK (7th title)
- Promoted: none
- Relegated: ASV Köln Rugby
- Top point scorer: Fabian Heimpel (225)
- Top try scorer: Alexander Pipa (22)

The 2009–10 Rugby-Bundesliga was the 39th edition of this competition and the 90th edition of the German rugby union championship. Ten teams played a home-and-away season with a finals round between the top four teams at the end. The bottom two teams are relegated. The season started on 29 August 2009 and finished with the championship final on 29 May 2010, interrupted by a winter break from early December to late March.

The competition's defending champion was SC 1880 Frankfurt, who won it in the previous two seasons. In the 2010 final, SC 1880 lost to Heidelberger RK, the previous seasons runners-up, which won its first championship since 1986 and its seventh overall. The final was drawn 22-all after regular time and was decided in extra time, where HRK scored 17 unanswered points to be crowned German champions of the men, already having won the 2010 women's final earlier that year. The 2010 final was contested by the two teams expected to do so at the start of the season, SC 1880 and HRK being the only two teams in Germany considered professional. The final was considered to have been of high niveau, with long-term German Bundestrainer Peter Ianusevici declaring it the best German championship final he had ever watched.

Below the Rugby-Bundesliga sat the 2nd Rugby-Bundesliga, which is divided into two divisions with ten teams each. With the RC Luxembourg, a team from Luxembourg, a non-German side competed in the league in 2009-10. The inclusion of this side in the 2009 promotion round to the 2nd Bundesliga had caused some debate in regard to its legality, as the club had not qualified to do so through the German league system and was not a member of any of the German regional rugby federations. However, RC Luxembourg's application was declared valid in regard to the German Rugby Federation's rules and regulations and the team finished second in the promotion round, earning a place in the 2nd Bundesliga for 2009-10.

Location of teams in the Rugby-Bundesliga 2009-10

== Overview ==
The 2009-10 modus was somewhat different from the previous season. The competition had been expanded from nine to ten teams. It marks the first time since introduction of the single-division Bundesliga in 2001, that ten teams competed in the league. This change of modus was decided upon on 19 July 2008 at the annual general meeting of the German rugby association, the DRV. It was decided to expand the league to ten teams for 2009-10. It was also then decided to introduce an extended play-off format. All up, the number of season games in the Rugby-Bundesliga increases to 94 from 76.

Like in 2008-09, the top four teams qualified for the finals. The two semi-finals winners then contested the championship final.

At the bottom end of the table, nominally the last two teams were relegated while the 2nd Rugby-Bundesliga champions are promoted, however, this was subject to the 2nd Bundesliga champions accepting promotion, which was not the case.

The defending champion in 2009-10 was SC 1880 Frankfurt, who beat Heidelberger RK in the 2008-09 final while the ASV Köln Rugby and DSV 78 Hannover were newly promoted to the league, having replaced the DRC Hannover. Suffering from a string of injuries, especially to its forward line, and heavy defeats during the season, ASV Köln Rugby made the decision in mid-April 2010, to withdraw from the Rugby-Bundesliga and not to play its five remaining matches. Köln thereby was automatically relegated from the league.

In the 2nd Bundesliga, the winners of the two divisions were nominally promoted to the Bundesliga, unless they were reserve teams, in which case the right for promotion would have gone to the next-best non-reserve team. The bottom two teams in the 2nd Bundesliga faced the prospect of relegation to the Rugby-Regionalliga. In the South/West Division, the Karlsruher SV Rugby withdrew in March 2010, its record being expulsed.

As a sign of the gap between the Bundesliga and the 2nd Bundesliga, TSV Victoria Linden, who only won the 2009-10 North/East division in the last round of the championship, declined promotion, citing the additional cost of travelling and the limited player pool as their reason. The South/West champion, Stuttgarter RC, has also indicated that it would not take up promotion because of the loss of eight first-team players at the end of the season, leaving the Bundesliga with only eight clubs for the next season. It also meant, for the first time ever, that no club from Hanover would compete at the top level of German rugby.

DSV 78 protested the decision to reduce the league to eight teams again and thereby relegating the club. For the 2nd Bundesliga, this also meant, only one team each would be promoted to the two regional divisions, in the North/East, this was SC Siemensstadt, the club being directly promoted, while, in the South/West, TV Pforzheim won the promotion tournament of the five southern Regionalliga champions in Nuremberg on 12 June 2010.

== Bundesliga table ==
	Club	Played	Won	Drawn	Lost	Points for	Points against	Difference	Points
1	SC 1880 Frankfurt	16	14	0	2	716	143	573	66
2	RG Heidelberg	16	11	2	3	512	307	205	57
3	Heidelberger RK	16	10	2	4	575	221	354	54
4	TSV Handschuhsheim	16	9	2	5	383	292	91	49
5	SC Neuenheim	16	9	1	6	347	320	27	47
6	Berliner Rugby Club	16	5	0	11	364	414	-50	29
7	RK 03 Berlin	16	5	1	10	259	589	-330	27
8	RK Heusenstamm	16	3	0	13	233	719	-486	14
9	DSV 78 Hannover	16	2	0	14	156	540	-384	10
10	ASV Köln Rugby	0	0	0	0	0	0	0	0

- Relegated: ASV Köln Rugby
- Promoted: None
- ASV Köln Rugby withdrew in April 2010, its record being expulsed.

== Bundesliga results ==
Club	SCF	RGH	HRK	TSV	SCN	BRC	RKB	RKH	DSV	ASV
SC 1880 Frankfurt	—	40-6	33-16	29-6	20-23	23-14	59-8	84-0	68-5	50-0
RG Heidelberg	23-9	—	31-24	16-20	22-28	48-12	68-3	50-18	51-9	0-0
Heidelberger RK	3-5	34-34	—	16-12	20-20	27-13	61-5	43-3	74-10	65-0
TSV Handschuhsheim	15-22	13-13	7-37	—	23-20	25-11	10-10	38-24	33-8	59-0
SC Neuenheim	0-28	23-31	6-29	27-20	—	26-17	24-7	43-10	25-16	81-0
Berliner RC	5-94	12-18	25-17	10-14	18-20	—	51-19	77-21	39-5	0-0
RK 03 Berlin	12-57	26-39	7-73	19-61	17-12	23-18	—	36-19	34-3	51-10
RK Heusenstamm	7-102	21-34	10-63	12-54	14-29	19-17	31-28	—	24-18	25-15
DSV 78 Hannover	0-43	15-28	0-38	18-32	28-21	15-25	3-5	3-0	—	0-0
ASV Köln Rugby	0-0	0-77	0-0	8-79	5-53	3-24	0-97	3-49	0-22	—

- ASV Köln Rugby played 13 of its 18 scheduled matches before withdrawing, results were later expulsed from the record.

=== Key ===
Home win	Draw	Away win	Game not played

== Player statistics ==
=== Try scorers ===
The leading try scores in the Rugby-Bundesliga 2009–10 season were (10 tries or more):

Player	Club	Tries
(Germany) Alexander Pipa	TSV Handschuhsheim	22
(Zimbabwe) Manasah Sita	SC Neuenheim	19
(South Africa) Pieter Johannes Jordaan	Heidelberger RK	19
(New Zealand) Caine Elisara	Heidelberger RK	19
(Germany) Bastian Himmer	RG Heidelberg	15
(Germany) Mark Sztyndera	SC 1880 Frankfurt	13
(Germany) Colin Grzanna	Berliner RC	13
(New Zealand) Keiran Manawatu	SC 1880 Frankfurt	13
(Germany) Christian Lill	RK 03 Berlin	11
(Germany) Marten Strauch	SC Neuenheim	11
(New Zealand) Jason Campell	SC 1880 Frankfurt	10
(Germany) Tom Schilling	RK 03 Berlin	10
(Australia) Sean Armstrong	Heidelberger RK	10

=== Point scorers ===
The leading point scores in the Rugby-Bundesliga 2009–10 season were (100 points or more):

Player	Club	Points
(Germany) Fabian Heimpel	RG Heidelberg	225
(Germany) Mark Sztyndera	SC 1880 Frankfurt	133
(Germany) Thorsten Wiedemann	Heidelberger RK	128
(New Zealand) Keiran Manawatu	SC 1880 Frankfurt	128
(Germany) Pascal Schuster	RK Heusenstamm	115
(Germany) Matthias Pipa	TSV Handschuhsheim	113
(Germany) Colin Grzanna	Berliner RC	111
(Germany) Alexander Pipa	TSV Handschuhsheim	110

=== Per club ===
The top try and point scorers per club were:

Club	Player	Tries	Player	Points
Berliner RC	(Germany) Colin Grzanna	13	(Germany) Colin Grzanna	111
RK 03 Berlin	(Germany) Christian Lill	11	(Germany) Marc Lowdon	96
SC 1880 Frankfurt	(Germany) Mark Sztyndera	13	(Germany) Mark Sztyndera	133
TSV Handschuhsheim	(Germany) Alexander Pipa	22	(Germany) Matthias Pipa	113
DSV 78 Hannover	(Germany) Benjamin Simm	4	(Germany) Marvin Dieckmann	67
RG Heidelberg	(Germany) Bastian Himmer	15	(Germany) Fabian Heimpel	225
Heidelberger RK	(South Africa) Pieter Johannes Jordaan (New Zealand) Caine Elisara	19	(Germany) Thorsten Wiedemann	128
RK Heusenstamm	(Germany) Torsten Krapscha	5	(Germany) Pascal Schuster	115
ASV Köln Rugby	Seven players	1	(Germany) Tobias Sylvester	11
SC Neuenheim	(Zimbabwe) Manasah Sita	19	(Germany) Lars Eckert	56

== Semi-finals and final ==
=== Semi-finals ===
2010-05-22
15:00

RG Heidelberg	15 – 36	Heidelberger RK
Try: Himmer (2) 72', 80'; Con: Heimpel 80'; Pen: Heimpel 10'	Report	Try: Armstrong, Liebig (2), Elisara; Con: Hamstra (2); Pen: Hamstra (3); Drop: Hamstra

Fritz-Grunebaum-Sportpark, Heidelberg
Attendance: 900
Referee: Dana Teargarden

2010-05-23
15:00

SC 1880 Frankfurt	27 – 16	TSV Handschuhsheim
Try: Manawatu 15', Hauck 75'; Con: Manawatu 76'; Pen: Manawatu (5)	Report	Try: Wetzel 35'; Con: Pipa 35'; Pen: Pipa (3) 15', 40', 49'

Sportanlage an der Feldgerichtstrasse, Frankfurt am Main
Attendance: 800
Referee: Dana Teargarden

=== Final ===
2010-05-29
14:00

SC 1880 Frankfurt	22 – 39 (aet)	Heidelberger RK
Try: Porter 47'; Con: Manawatu 47'; Pen: Manawatu (5) 21', 33', 60', 75', 80'+	Report	Try: Liebig 54', Hamstra 68', Jordaan 81', Keinhorst 98'; Con: Hamstra (2) 81', 98'; Pen: Hamstra (4) 20', 51', 65', 88'; Drop: Jordaan 34'

Sportanlage an der Feldgerichtstrasse, Frankfurt am Main
Attendance: 1,800
Referee: Frank Himmer

SC 1880 FRANKFURT:
FB	15	Anton Ewald (substituted off) 51'
RW	14	Keiran Manawatu
OC	13	Mark Sztyndera (substituted off) 106'
IC	12	Graham Smith
LW	11	Sam Leung-Wai
FH	10	Jason Campell
SH	9	Dennis Feidelberg
N8	8	Ross Warrick (yellow card) 65' to 75'
OF	7	Andrew Porter
BF	6	Alexander Hauck (substituted off) 110'
RL	5	Daniel Preussner (substituted off) 51'
LL	4	Rolf Wacha (substituted off) 84'
TP	3	Sam Biddles
HK	2	Michael Howells
LP	1	Syd Douglas
Substitutes:
RL		Chad Slaby (substituted on) 51'
FB		Bevan Gray (substituted on) 51' (substituted off) 94'
N8		Andrew Shaw (substituted on) 94'
FB		Erik Podzuweit (substituted on) 94'
OC		Alexander Berwing (substituted on) 106'
BF		Rico Schomacker (substituted on) 110'
Coach:
(New Zealand) Aaron Satchwell

HEIDELBERGER RK:
FB	15	James Keinhorst (substituted off) 110'
RW	14	Christopher Neureuther
OC	13	Steffen Liebig (substituted off) 105'
IC	12	Pieter Johannes Jordaan
LW	11	Anjo Buckman (substituted off) 71'
FH	10	Carlin Hamstra
SH	9	Sean Armstrong
N8	8	Manuel Ballerin (substituted off) 55'
OF	7	Carlo Schmidt (substituted off) 51'
BF	6	Caine Elisara
RL	5	Julio David Rodriguez
LL	4	Dan Armitage
TP	3	Patrick Schliwa (substituted off) 75'
HK	2	Alexander Biskupek
LP	1	Arthur Zeiler
Substitutes:
OF		Sydney Brenner (substituted on) 51'
N8		Ben Dubyk (substituted on) 55'
LW		Christopher Liebig (substituted on) 71'
TP		Alexander Wiedemann (substituted on) 75' (substituted off) 105'
TP		Benedikt Rehm (substituted on) 105'
OC		Andreas Götz (substituted on) 105'
FB		Erkut Leventdurmus (substituted on) 110'
Coach:
(Australia) Murray Archibald

== 2nd Bundesliga tables ==
=== South/West ===
	Club	Played	Won	Drawn	Lost	Points for	Points against	Difference	Points
1	Stuttgarter RC	16	13	0	3	610	194	416	63
2	München RFC	16	12	1	3	424	258	166	58
3	RC Luxembourg	16	12	0	4	309	245	64	53
4	RG Heidelberg II	16	8	0	8	311	294	17	41
5	SC 1880 Frankfurt II	16	6	0	10	374	328	46	34
6	StuSta München	16	7	1	8	298	391	-93	34
7	TSV Handschuhsheim II	16	5	0	11	243	328	-85	25
8	Heidelberger RK II	16	5	0	11	202	451	-249	17
9	RC Mainz	16	3	0	13	230	512	-282	17
10	Karlsruher SV Rugby	0	0	0	0	0	0	0	0

- Promoted to Bundesliga: None
- Relegated from Bundesliga: ASV Köln Rugby
- Relegated from 2nd Bundesliga: Karlsruher SV Rugby, RC Mainz
- Promoted to 2nd Bundesliga: TV Pforzheim
- Karlsruher SV Rugby withdrew in March 2010, its record being expulsed.

=== North/East ===
	Club	Played	Won	Drawn	Lost	Points for	Points against	Difference	Points
1	TSV Victoria Linden	178	16	0	2	656	202	454	76
2	USV Potsdam	18	15	0	3	838	193	645	74
3	RU Hohen Neuendorf	18	13	0	5	614	243	371	63
4	FC St Pauli Rugby	18	12	0	6	592	251	341	62
5	SG SV Odin/VfR Döhren	18	11	0	7	412	325	87	49
6	SC Germania List	18	9	1	8	333	465	-132	44
7	DRC Hannover	18	6	0	12	291	486	-195	31
8	Berliner RC II	18	4	0	14	236	682	-446	18
9	FT Adler Kiel Rugby	18	3	0	15	151	736	-585	13
10	Hamburger RC	18	0	1	17	147	687	-540	4

- Promoted to Bundesliga: None
- Relegated from Bundesliga: None
- Relegated from 2nd Bundesliga: FT Adler Kiel Rugby
- Promoted to 2nd Bundesliga: SC Siemensstadt

== 2nd Bundesliga final ==
2010-05-29
12:00

TSV Victoria Linden	10 – 59	Stuttgarter RC

Sportplatz an der Feldgerichtstraße, Frankfurt am Main
