= 2008–09 Rugby-Bundesliga =

- Countries: Germany
- Champions: SC Frankfurt 1880 (6th title)
- Runners-up: Heidelberger RK
- Relegated: DRC Hannover
- Top point scorer: Thorsten Wiedemann (212)
- Top try scorer: Alexander Pipa (22)

The Rugby-Bundesliga 2008-09 was the 38th edition of this competition and the 89th edition of the German rugby union championship. Nine teams play a home-and-away season with a finals round between the top four teams at the end. The bottom two teams determine which club is relegated in an end-of-season decider. The season started on 30 August 2008 and finished with the championship final on 23 May 2009, interrupted by a winter break from early December to late February.

The competition was won by the SC Frankfurt 1880 the previous season.

Location of teams in the Rugby-Bundesliga 2008-09

== Overview ==
The 2008-09 modus was somewhat different from the previous season. The competition had been expanded from eight to nine teams. The final, which used to be determined by the top-two teams of the regular season was now played by the two winners of the semi-finals which pair the first placed team against the fourth and the second against the third.

At the bottom end of the table, a relegation match between the two last-placed teams was also a new introduction. All up, the number of season games in the Rugby-Bundesliga increased to 76 from 57.

This change of modus was decided upon on 19 July 2008 at the annual general meeting of the German rugby association, the DRV. It was decided to expand the league to ten teams for 2009-10, meaning only one club was to be relegated in 2009, and two promoted. It was also then decided to introduce the extended play-off format.

The defending champion was SC 1880 Frankfurt, who beat RG Heidelberg in the 2007-08 final, while the RK 03 Berlin was newly promoted to the league.

With Kerstin Ljungdahl and Dana Teagarden, two female head referees have been officiating in the Rugby-Bundesliga in 2008-09.

== Bundesliga table ==
| | Club | Played | Won | Drawn | Lost | Points for | Points against | Difference | Points |
|---|---|---|---|---|---|---|---|---|---|
| 1 | SC 1880 Frankfurt | 16 | 14 | 0 | 2 | 693 | 227 | 466 | 70 |
| 2 | Heidelberger RK | 16 | 12 | 0 | 4 | 464 | 212 | 252 | 56 |
| 3 | SC Neuenheim | 16 | 10 | 0 | 6 | 423 | 287 | 136 | 49 |
| 4 | Berliner Rugby Club | 16 | 10 | 0 | 6 | 441 | 328 | 113 | 48 |
| 5 | RG Heidelberg | 16 | 10 | 0 | 6 | 323 | 281 | 42 | 46 |
| 6 | TSV Handschuhsheim | 16 | 9 | 0 | 7 | 521 | 377 | 144 | 46 |
| 7 | RK Heusenstamm | 16 | 5 | 0 | 11 | 336 | 515 | -179 | 29 |
| 8 | RK 03 Berlin | 16 | 2 | 0 | 14 | 195 | 688 | -493 | 11 |
| 9 | DRC Hannover | 16 | 0 | 0 | 16 | 176 | 657 | -481 | 0 |

- Relegated: DRC Hannover
- Promoted: ASV Köln Rugby and DSV 78 Hannover

== Player statistics ==
=== Try scorers ===
The leading try scores in the Rugby-Bundesliga 2008–09 season were (10 tries or more):

| Player | Club | Tries |
|---|---|---|
| (Germany) Alexander Pipa | TSV Handschuhsheim | 22 |
| (New Zealand) Bevan Grey | RK Heusenstamm | 13 |
| (New Zealand) Jason Campell | SC 1880 Frankfurt | 10 |
| (New Zealand) Marcus Seuseu | SC 1880 Frankfurt | 10 |
| (Fiji) Jovesa Naivalu | SC 1880 Frankfurt | 10 |

=== Point scorers ===
The leading point scores in the Rugby-Bundesliga 2008–09 season were (100 points or more):

| Player | Club | Points |
|---|---|---|
| (Germany) Thorsten Wiedemann | TSV Handschuhsheim | 212 |
| (South Africa) Braam Pretorius | Heidelberger RK | 211 |
| (Germany) Lars Eckert | SC Neuenheim | 137 |
| (Germany) Fabian Heimpel | RG Heidelberg | 129 |
| (Germany) Alexander Pipa | TSV Handschuhsheim | 110 |

=== Per club ===
The top try and point scorers per club were:

| Club | Player | Tries | Player | Points |
|---|---|---|---|---|
| Berliner RC | (Germany) Gerrit van Look | 8 | (Germany) Sebastian Freund | 74 |
| RK 03 Berlin | (Germany) Robin Knüpfer | 7 | (Germany) Robin Knüpfer | 35 |
| SC 1880 Frankfurt | (New Zealand) Jason Campell (New Zealand) Marcus Seuseu (Fiji) Jovesa Naivalu | 10 | (New Zealand) Rusell Kupa | 80 |
| TSV Handschuhsheim | (Germany) Alexander Pipa | 22 | (Germany) Thorsten Wiedemann | 212 |
| DRC Hannover | (Germany) Sven Pausch | 4 | (New Zealand) Dan Richards | 33 |
| RG Heidelberg | (Germany) Mustafa Güngör | 7 | (Germany) Fabian Heimpel | 129 |
| Heidelberger RK | (South Africa) Pieter Johannes Jordaan | 9 | (South Africa) Braam Pretorius | 211 |
| RK Heusenstamm | (New Zealand) Bevan Grey | 13 | (Germany) Mark Sztyndera | 82 |
| SC Neuenheim | (Paraguay) Juan Cabanas | 9 | (Germany) Lars Eckert | 137 |

== Bundesliga results ==
| Club | SCF | HRK | SCN | BRC | RGH | TSV | RKH | RKB | DRC |
|---|---|---|---|---|---|---|---|---|---|
| SC 1880 Frankfurt | — | 27-22 | 24-14 | 67-7 | 54-13 | 81-19 | 30-9 | 69-0 | 50-0 |
| Heidelberger RK | 13-23 | — | 38-3 | 12-10 | 23-17 | 38-8 | 33-5 | 56-0 | 78-7 |
| SC Neuenheim | 16-46 | 31-23 | — | 13-8 | 23-28 | 18-6 | 37-15 | 69-14 | 49-7 |
| Berliner RC | 20-12 | 15-35 | 31-16 | — | 29-13 | 22-19 | 88-15 | 59-0 | 30-15 |
| RG Heidelberg | 15-29 | 3-5 | 19-15 | 20-6 | — | 12-6 | 38-19 | 17-5 | 35-10 |
| TSV Handschuhsheim | 36-31 | 25-12 | 16-20 | 53-21 | 9-16 | — | 28-25 | 78-7 | 64-12 |
| RK Heusenstamm | 29-53 | 10-36 | 7-27 | 19-24 | 28-23 | 22-29 | — | 37-20 | 41-12 |
| RK 03 Berlin | 7-44 | 17-25 | 5-27 | 14-42 | 14-36 | 12-73 | 17-20 | — | 34-23 |
| DRC Hannover | 7-53 | 11-15 | 0-45 | 5-29 | 6-18 | 28-52 | 20-35 | 13-29 | — |

=== Key ===
| Home win | Draw | Away win | Game not played (awarded) |

== Promotion/relegation play-off ==
=== Relegation match ===
2009-05-21
15:00

| RK 03 Berlin | – | DRC Hannover |

- The DRC Hannover canceled the game on 18 April 2009 and voluntarily accepted relegation to the 2nd Bundesliga North/East.

== Semi-finals and final ==
=== Semi-finals ===
2009-05-16
15:00

| SC 1880 Frankfurt | 36 – 15 | Berliner Rugby Club |
| | Report |

Sportanlage an der Feldgerichtstrasse, Frankfurt am Main
Referee: Dana Teagarden

2009-05-16
15:00

| Heidelberger RK | 19 – 14 (aet) | SC Neuenheim |
| Try: Pretorius 98'; Con: Pretorius 98'; Pen: Pretorius (3) 7', 39', 56'; Drop: Jordaan 103' | Report | Try: Smit 98'; Pen: Eckert (3) 16', 40', 60' |

Heidelberg
Attendance: 1,200
Referee: Frank Himmer

=== Final ===
2009-05-23
14:00

| SC 1880 Frankfurt | 11 – 8 | Heidelberger RK |
| Try: Kupa 36'; Pen: Kupa (2) 10', 73' | Report | Try: Schliwa 20'; Pen: Pretorius 52' |

Sportanlage an der Feldgerichtstrasse, Frankfurt am Main
Attendance: 3,200
Referee: Jens Reinecke

SC 1880 FRANKFURT:
| FB | 15 | Ralph Klinghammer (substituted off) 46' |
| RW | 14 | Jamie Houston |
| OC | 13 | Kuramate Tama Tuirirangi (substituted off) 79' |
| IC | 12 | Daniel Preussner (substituted off) 61' |
| LW | 11 | Rolf Wacha |
| FH | 10 | Corey Read |
| SH | 9 | Aaron Satchwell |
| N8 | 8 | Ross Warrick |
| OF | 7 | Api Matenga (substituted off) 76' |
| BF | 6 | Jason Campell |
| RL | 5 | Kieran Manawatu |
| LL | 4 | Philip Aporo (substituted off) 55' |
| TP | 3 | Anton Ewald |
| HK | 2 | Bratley Langenhoven (substituted off) 61' |
| LP | 1 | Russel Kupa |
Substitutes:
| HK | 16 | Marcus Seuseu (substituted on) 61' (substituted off) 71' |
| LL | 17 | Jovesa Naivalu (substituted on) 55' |
| OF | 18 | Dennis Feidelberg (substituted on) 76' |
| IC | 19 | Jannis Läpple (substituted on) 61' (substituted off) 79' |
| IC | 20 | Karsten Dobs (substituted on) 79' |
| OC | 21 | Chris Howells (substituted on) 79' |
| FB | 22 | Syd Douglas (substituted on) 46' |
Coach:
(New Zealand) Phil Stevenson

HEIDELBERGER RK:
| FB | 15 | Frederik Potgieter |
| RW | 14 | Alexander Biskupek |
| OC | 13 | Patrick Schliwa (substituted off) 65' |
| IC | 12 | Dan Armitage |
| LW | 11 | Julio David Rodriguez |
| FH | 10 | Manuel Ballerin (substituted off) 77' |
| SH | 9 | Andreas Kerber (substituted off) 75' |
| N8 | 8 | Johannes Erasmus |
| OF | 7 | Sean Armstrong |
| BF | 6 | Pieter Johannes Jordaan |
| RL | 5 | Christopher Liebig (substituted off) 40' |
| LL | 4 | Sydney Brenner |
| TP | 3 | Christoffer Neureuther |
| HK | 2 | Steffen Liebig |
| LP | 1 | Braam Pretorius |
Substitutes:
| RL | 16 | Jürgen Missal (substituted on) 40' |
| SH | 17 | Sascha Fraser (substituted on) 75' |
| FH | 18 | Jörg Bielinski (substituted on) 77' |
| OC | 19 | Arthur Zeiler (substituted on) 65' |
| | 20 |
| | 21 |
| | 22 |
Coach:
(Australia) Murray Archibald

== 2nd Bundesliga tables ==
=== South/West ===
| | Club | Played | Won | Drawn | Lost | Points for | Points against | Difference | Points |
|---|---|---|---|---|---|---|---|---|---|
| 1 | SC 1880 Frankfurt II | 18 | 16 | 0 | 2 | 778 | 217 | 561 | 77 |
| 2 | ASV Köln Rugby | 18 | 15 | 0 | 3 | 515 | 166 | 349 | 72 |
| 3 | RG Heidelberg II | 18 | 11 | 1 | 6 | 445 | 357 | 88 | 57 |
| 4 | München RFC | 18 | 8 | 1 | 9 | 451 | 350 | 91 | 48 |
| 5 | TSV Handschuhsheim II | 18 | 7 | 0 | 11 | 334 | 442 | -108 | 37 |
| 6 | StuSta München | 18 | 8 | 0 | 10 | 270 | 393 | -123 | 37 |
| 7 | RC Mainz ‡ | 18 | 6 | 0 | 12 | 343 | 513 | -170 | 33 |
| 8 | Heidelberger RK II ‡ | 18 | 6 | 2 | 10 | 265 | 472 | -207 | 31 |
| 9 | Stuttgarter RC | 18 | 5 | 1 | 12 | 256 | 380 | -124 | 30 |
| 10 | SG Heidelberger TV/SC Neuenheim II | 18 | 5 | 1 | 12 | 259 | 616 | -357 | 24 |

- Promoted to Bundesliga: ASV Köln Rugby (SC 1880 Frankfurt II ineligible)
- Relegated from Bundesliga: none
- Relegated from 2nd Bundesliga: SG Heidelberger TV/SC Neuenheim II
- Promoted to 2nd Bundesliga: RC Luxembourg, Karlsruher SV Rugby
- ‡ Two points deducted for break of licensing agreement; insufficient numbers of youth teams.

=== North/East ===
| | Club | Played | Won | Drawn | Lost | Points for | Points against | Difference | Points |
|---|---|---|---|---|---|---|---|---|---|
| 1 | DSV 78/08 Ricklingen | 18 | 18 | 0 | 0 | 1138 | 135 | 1003 | 87 |
| 2 | TSV Victoria Linden | 18 | 15 | 0 | 3 | 720 | 246 | 474 | 72 |
| 3 | USV Potsdam | 18 | 14 | 0 | 4 | 804 | 271 | 533 | 69 |
| 4 | FC St Pauli Rugby | 18 | 11 | 0 | 7 | 632 | 311 | 321 | 56 |
| 5 | SG SV Odin/VfR Döhren | 18 | 11 | 0 | 7 | 509 | 328 | 181 | 52 |
| 6 | RU Hohen Neuendorf | 18 | 9 | 0 | 9 | 452 | 401 | 51 | 45 |
| 7 | SC Germania List | 18 | 4 | 0 | 14 | 250 | 813 | -563 | 20 |
| 8 | Hamburger RC | 18 | 4 | 0 | 14 | 235 | 891 | -656 | 19 |
| 9 | Berliner SV 92 Rugby | 18 | 3 | 1 | 14 | 201 | 857 | -656 | 15 |
| 10 | SG Schwalbe/DRC Hannover II ‡ | 18 | 0 | 1 | 17 | 114 | 802 | -688 | -7 |

- Promoted to Bundesliga: DSV 78/08 Ricklingen
- Relegated from Bundesliga: DRC Hannover
- Relegated from 2nd Bundesliga: SG Schwalbe/DRC Hannover II, Berliner SV 92 Rugby
- Promoted to 2nd Bundesliga: Berliner RC II, FT Adler Kiel Rugby
- ‡ Team withdrawn from the competition on 22 April 2009 due to a lack of players.

== 2nd Bundesliga final ==
2009-05-23
12:00

| DSV 78/08 Ricklingen | 10 – 24 | SC 1880 Frankfurt II |

Referee: Scharmann

== DRV-Pokal 2008-09 ==
In 2008-09, 16 teams took part in the national cup competition, those being the eight clubs who played in the Bundesliga in 2007-08 plus the top-four of each of the two 2nd Bundesligas that season.

Round of 16
SC 1880 Frankfurt | 51
Heidelberger RK | 20
TSV Handschuhsheim II | 8
Berliner Rugby Club | 36
FC St. Pauli | 0
DRC Hannover ^{1} | 50
Stuttgarter RC | 17
TSV Victoria Linden | 10
RG Heidelberg | 45
RK 03 Berlin | 3
TSV Handschuhsheim | 39
RK Heusenstamm | 19
ASV Köln Rugby | 7
SC 1880 Frankfurt II | 24
DSV 78/08 Ricklingen | 10
SC Neuenheim | 6

Quarterfinals
Berliner Rugby Club | 7
SC 1880 Frankfurt | 17
DRC Hannover | 15
Stuttgarter RC | 0
TSV Handschuhsheim | 15
RG Heidelberg | 13
SC 1880 Frankfurt II | 18
DSV 78/08 Ricklingen | 16

Semifinals
SC 1880 Frankfurt | 50
DRC Hannover ^{2} | 0
SC 1880 Frankfurt II | 17
TSV Handschuhsheim | 34

Finals
SC 1880 Frankfurt | 56
TSV Handschuhsheim | 24

Source:"DRV-Pokal 2008-09". Rugby-web.de.

- ^{1} Game not played, awarded to DRC Hannover.
- ^{2} Game awarded to Frankfurt after Hannover cancelled the game, stating that they were unable to compete at the scheduled date and no other date being available.
