= 2006–2008 European Nations Cup Second Division =

The 2006–2008 European Nations Cup (ENC) Second Division (a European rugby union competition for national teams) will be contested over two years during which all teams meet each other home and away. The winner of Division 2A, Germany, will be promoted to Division 1 and fifth place, Netherlands, relegated to Division 2B. The winner, Poland, and loser of Division 2B shall be promoted to Division 2A and relegated to Division 3A, respectively.

In 2006 Ukraine was relegated from the First Division to Division 2A and Latvia promoted from Division 3A to 2B. The other teams joined from Round 3 of the qualification for the World Cup 2007. Spain, the winner of Round 3 of WC qual., was thereby promoted to the First Division in 2006.

== Division 2A ==
Pos	Team	Games				Points			Table Points
Pos	Team	Play	Won	Draw	Lost	For	Ag.	Diff.	Table Points
1	Germany	8	6	0	2	191	124	+67	20
2	Belgium	8	6	0	2	214	147	+67	20
3	Moldova	8	5	0	3	163	157	+6	18
4	Ukraine	8	3	0	5	117	128	−11	14
5	Netherlands	8	0	0	8	97	226	−129	8

- In the event of a tie the following rules apply: champion to be decided by 1. Winner of the games between tied teams 2. Best difference points for and against in all pool matches 3. Best difference between tried in all pool matches 4. Higher number of points 5. Higher number of tries
- Germany was promoted because they won on aggregate in the two games played between them and Belgium (32 – 13 and 18 – 32 giving an aggregate of 50 – 45).

4 November 2006

Belgium	24–11	Ukraine

Brussels

11 November 2006

Moldova	26–24	Germany

Chișinău

18 November 2006

Netherlands	18–29	Ukraine

Amsterdam

18 November 2006

Germany	32–13	Belgium

Heidelberg

26 November 2006

Moldova	43–7	Netherlands

Chișinău

21 April 2007

Ukraine	14–22	Germany

Kyiv

21 April 2007

Belgium	27–29	Moldova

Brussels

28 April 2007

Germany	21–12	Netherlands

Hannover

5 May 2007

Ukraine	16–17	Moldova

Kyiv

5 May 2007

Netherlands	20–27	Belgium

Amsterdam

10 November 2007

Ukraine	13–7	Netherlands

Kyiv

10 November 2007

Belgium	32–18	Germany

Brussels

17 November 2007

Netherlands	13–15	Moldova

Amsterdam

24 November 2007

Germany	34–5	Moldova

Heidelberg

24 November 2007

Ukraine	15–18	Belgium

Feodosiya

12 April 2008

Moldova	19–22	Belgium

Chișinău

19 April 2008

Germany	13–5	Ukraine

Hannover

26 April 2008

Netherlands	17–27	Germany

Amsterdam

3 May 2008

Moldova	9–14	Ukraine

Chișinău

3 May 2008

Belgium	51–3	Netherlands

Brussels

== Division 2B ==
Pos	Team	Games				Points			Table Points
Pos	Team	Play	Won	Draw	Lost	For	Ag.	Diff.	Table Points
1	Poland	8	7	0	1	266	67	+199	22
2	Latvia	8	5	0	3	150	165	−15	18
3	Croatia	8	4	0	4	133	134	−1	16
4	Malta	8	2	0	6	125	210	−85	12
5	Andorra	8	2	0	6	118	216	−98	12

- Andorra was relegated because they lost on aggregate in the two games played between them and Malta (24 – 24 and 17 – 16 giving an aggregate of 41 – 47).

7 October 2006

Poland	54–8	Andorra
Try: Hotowski (2); Sajur (2); Komisarczuk; Łukasiewicz; Urbanowicz; Wojaczek; Con: Stępień (7)		Try: Duran; Pen: Abelló

Kraków
Attendance: approx. 300–400
Referee: Paolo Ventura

4 November 2006

Andorra	21–34	Latvia

Andorre

4 November 2006

Malta	18–49	Croatia

Paola

28 October 2006

Croatia	11–12	Poland
		Try: Hotowski (2); Con: Banaszek (2/2)

Makarska

29 October 2006

Latvia	27–16	Malta

Riga

31 March 2007

Croatia	7–27	Latvia

Makarska

7 April 2007

Andorra	24–13	Croatia

Andorra La Vella

5 May 2007

Latvia	9–33	Poland
		Try: Sajur (2); Hotowski; Łukasiewicz; Pisarek; Con: Bukhalo (4)

Riga

12 May 2007

Malta	31–24	Andorra

Paola

19 May 2007

Poland	36–3	Malta
Try: Królikowski; Łukasiewicz; Mirosz; Miśkiewicz; Wojaczek; Con: Bukhalo (4); Pen: Bukhalo		Pen: Mirabell

Siedlce
Attendance: 2500
Referee: Gheorghe Sabău

29 September 2007

Andorra	5–33	Poland
Try: Alieu		Try: Hotowski (3); Banaszek; Pisarek; Con: Banaszek (4)

Andorra la Vella
Attendance: approx. 300–400
Referee: Paolo Ventura

27 October 2007

Poland	14–15	Croatia
Try: Michalak; Pen: Bukhalo (3)		Pen: Ursić (5)

Gdynia

10 November 2007

Croatia	24–9	Malta

Makarska

17 November 2007

Malta	16–13	Latvia

Marsa

24 November 2007

Latvia	20–9	Andorra

Riga

19 April 2008

Croatia	15–10	Andorra

Split

26 April 2008

Poland	55–0	Latvia
Try: Banaszek (2); Hotowski (2); Pisarek; Popławski; Stępień; Con: Bukhalo (7); Pen: Bukhalo (2)

Koszalin

10 May 2008

Malta	16–29	Poland
		Try: Banaszek; Bukhalo; Miśkiewicz; Podolski; Con: Banaszek (2); Bukhalo; Pen: Bukhalo

Marsa

10 May 2008

Latvia	20–8	Croatia

Riga

17 May 2008

Andorra	17–16	Malta

Andorra la Vella

== See also ==
- 2006-2008 European Nations Cup First Division
- 2006-2008 European Nations Cup Third Division
