= Landesmuseum Württemberg =

Museum in Stuttgart, Germany

Coordinates: 48°46′37″N 9°10′44″E

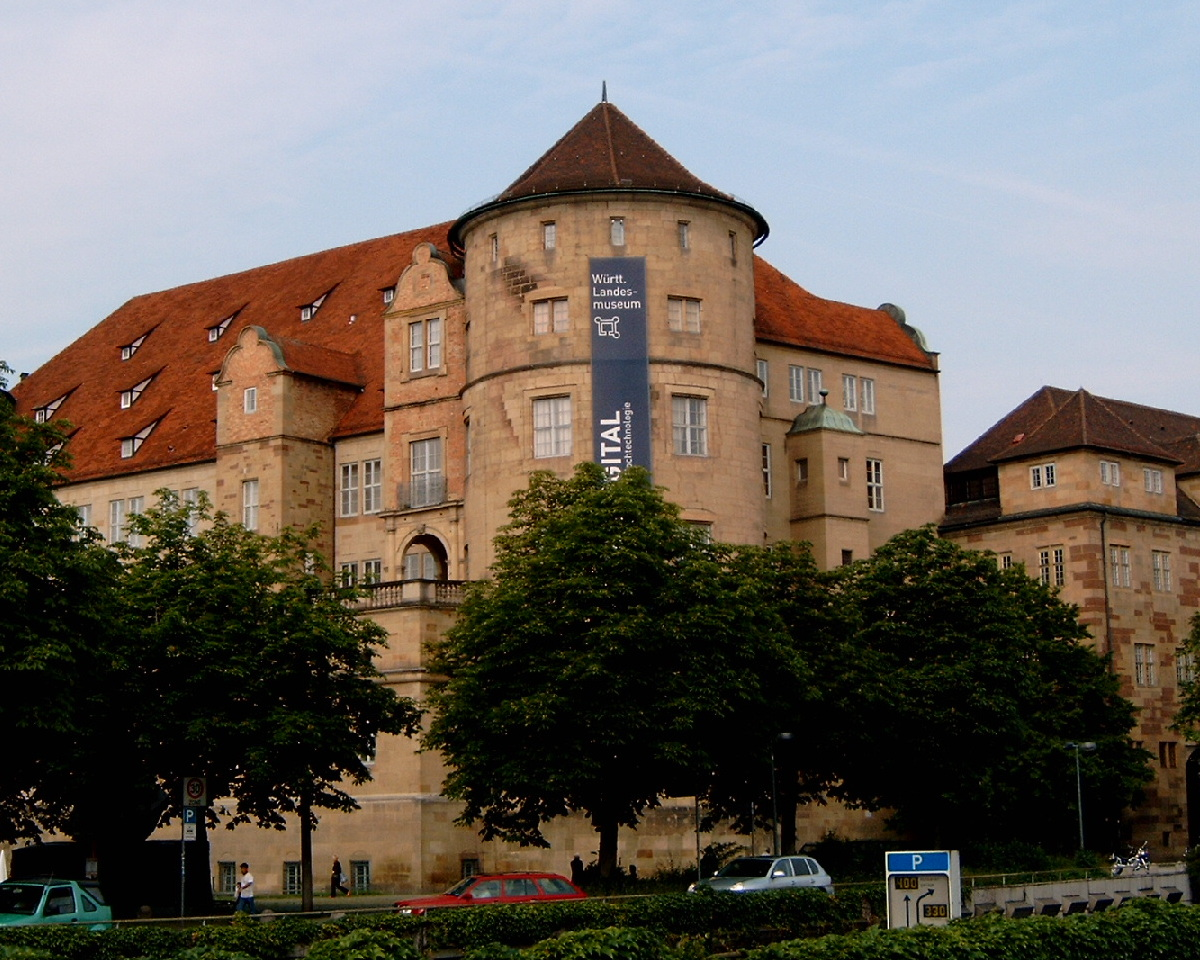
Old Castle in Stuttgart, museum main building

The Landesmuseum Württemberg (Württemberg State Museum) is the main historical museum of the Württemberg part of the German state of Baden-Württemberg. It emerged from the 16th-century “Kunstkammer” (Cabinet of art and curiosities) of the dukes, later kings, of Württemberg who resided in Stuttgart. As a museum it was founded in 1862 by King William I.

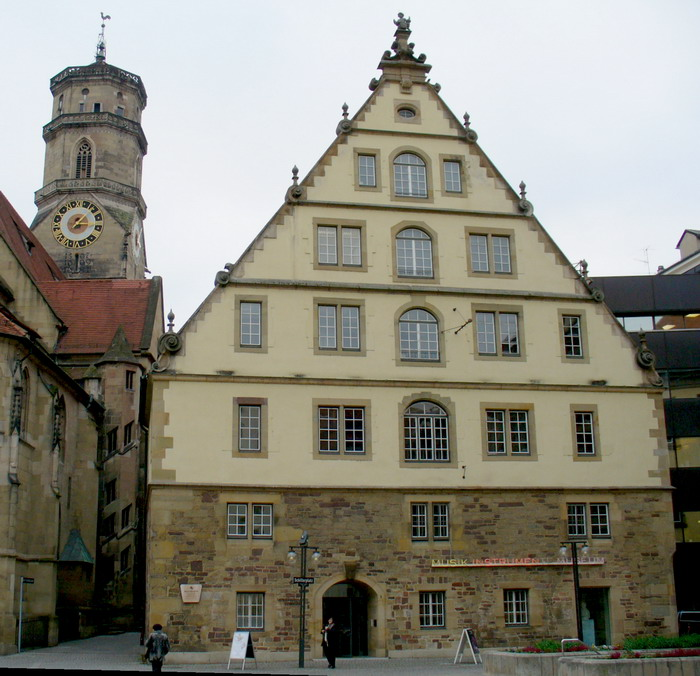
Ducal granary: musical instruments collection

== Collections in Stuttgart and Waldenbuch ==
The museum's main location is the Old Castle in Stuttgart. The nearby granary and the cellar of the New Castle also contain parts of the collections as well as Waldenbuch Castle outside of Stuttgart.

The collections are grouped into eight divisions:

- Schausammlung LegendäreMeisterWerke (Legendary Masterpieces)
  - archeology: Paleolithic, Neolithic, Bronze Age, Iron Age, antiquity, Romans in Württemberg, early Middle Ages
  - history of art and cultural history: Württemberg crown jewels, medieval art, modern glass painting
- Schausammlung Wahre Schätze (Real Treasures)
  - Antikensammlung - Museum of Ancient Art
  - Kunstkammer - Cabinet of Art and Curiosities
  - Kelten - Early Celtic Treasures
- Glass collection of Ernesto Wolf
  - antique glass
  - modern era glass
- Clocks and scientific instruments
- Kindermuseum Junges Schloss - Museum for Children
- Musical instruments (located in the Fruchtkasten (granary))
- Roman lapidarium (located in the cellar of Neues Schloss (New Castle))
- Folklore (located at the Museum of Everyday Culture in Waldenbuch Castle outside of Stuttgart): labor, belief and piety, graphic design, clothing, merchandise, culture of living.

Apart from these collections the museum regularly features special exhibitions.

The museum presents a whole range of archeological treasures and a notable collection of medieval art. It also includes the inventories of the former army and manufacturing museums. Some of the most valuable possessions of the museum were already acquired by the dukes for their art chamber: two of only four preserved Aztec feather shields from before 1521 and the oldest preserved card game, about 1430, richly decorated and expensive already at the time of production. Exhibits of local origin include a celestial globe of 1493 by Johannes Stöffler, an 11-digit mechanical calculator of 1774 by Philipp Matthäus Hahn (the first to build functional calculators to Gottfried Leibniz' design for all four arithmetic operations), and, probably the museum's most symbolic exhibit despite being similar to other ones: the royal Württemberg crown of 1797.

== Further Collections ==
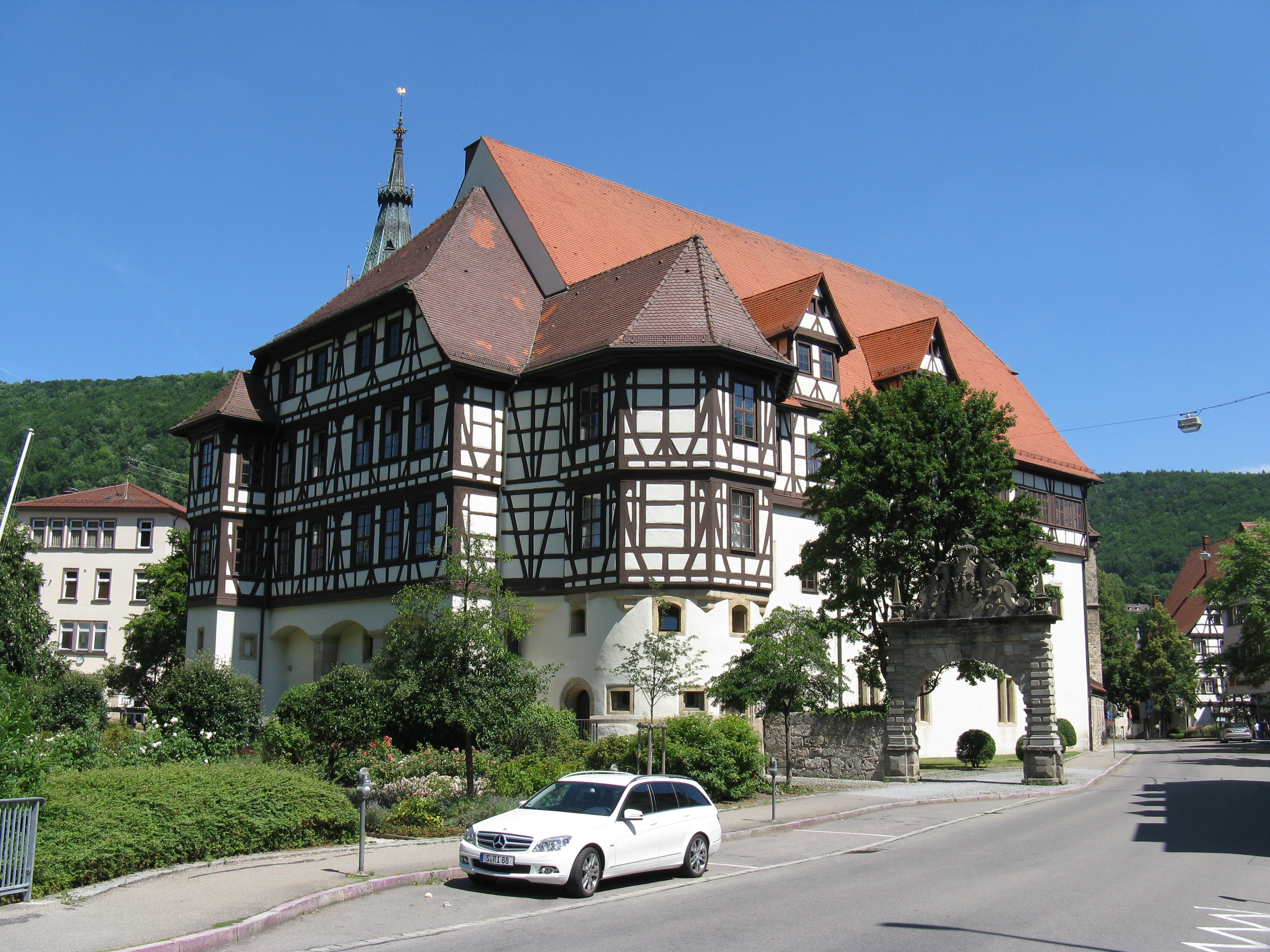
Urach Castle: sleighs of state

The museum today has a further seven branches throughout Württemberg referring to special topics:

- Schlossmuseum Aulendorf (Aulendorf Castle museum): old toys and art of the classicism period
- Schloss Urach (Urach Castle): sleighs of state, 25 specimens, world's biggest collection of this kind
- Museum für Kutschen, Chaisen, Karren (museum for carriages, chaises, carts), Hellenstein Castle, Heidenheim
- German Playing Card Museum (Deutsches Spielkartenmuseum), Leinfelden-Echterdingen: 15,000 card decks and 500,000 cards from seven centuries. The biggest public collection of playing cards in Europe
- Fashion museum, Ludwigsburg Palace
- Ceramics museum and Ludwigsburg porcelain, Ludwigsburg Palace
- Dominican museum, Rottweil: archeological collection on arae flaviae (Rottweil), oldest town (AD 73)in Baden-Württemberg; medieval religious art collection; contemporary art collection of the Rottweil area

Several other former branches now belong to the separate Baden-Württemberg State Archeological Museum (Archäologisches Landesmuseum Baden-Württemberg), which has been founded in 1990 due to the ever increasing findings of archeological heritage in the state.

== Selected exhibits of Landesmuseum Württemberg ==
Stuttgart collections
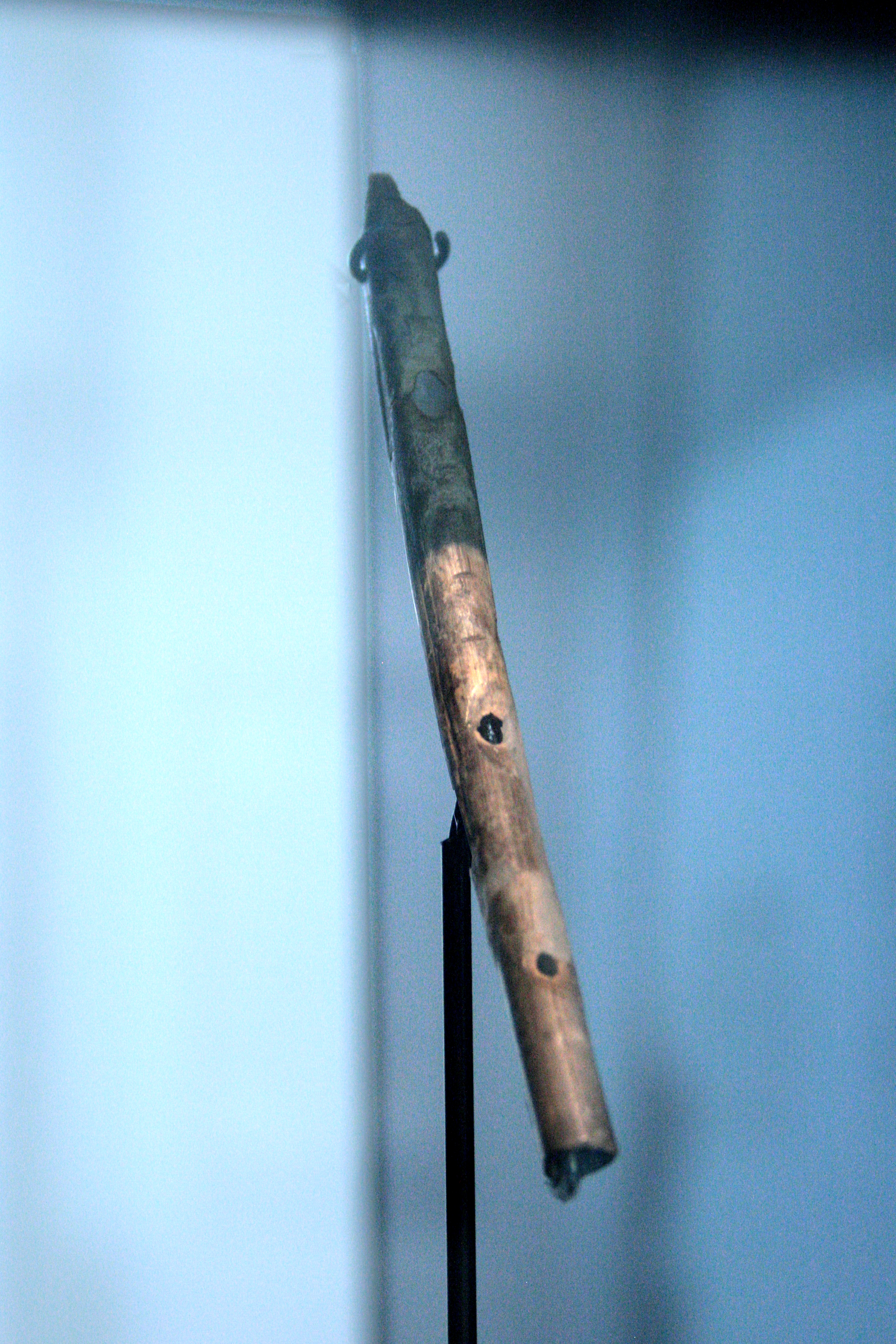
Aurignacian flute, one of the eldest music instruments ever known (age: 35.000–40.000 year old)

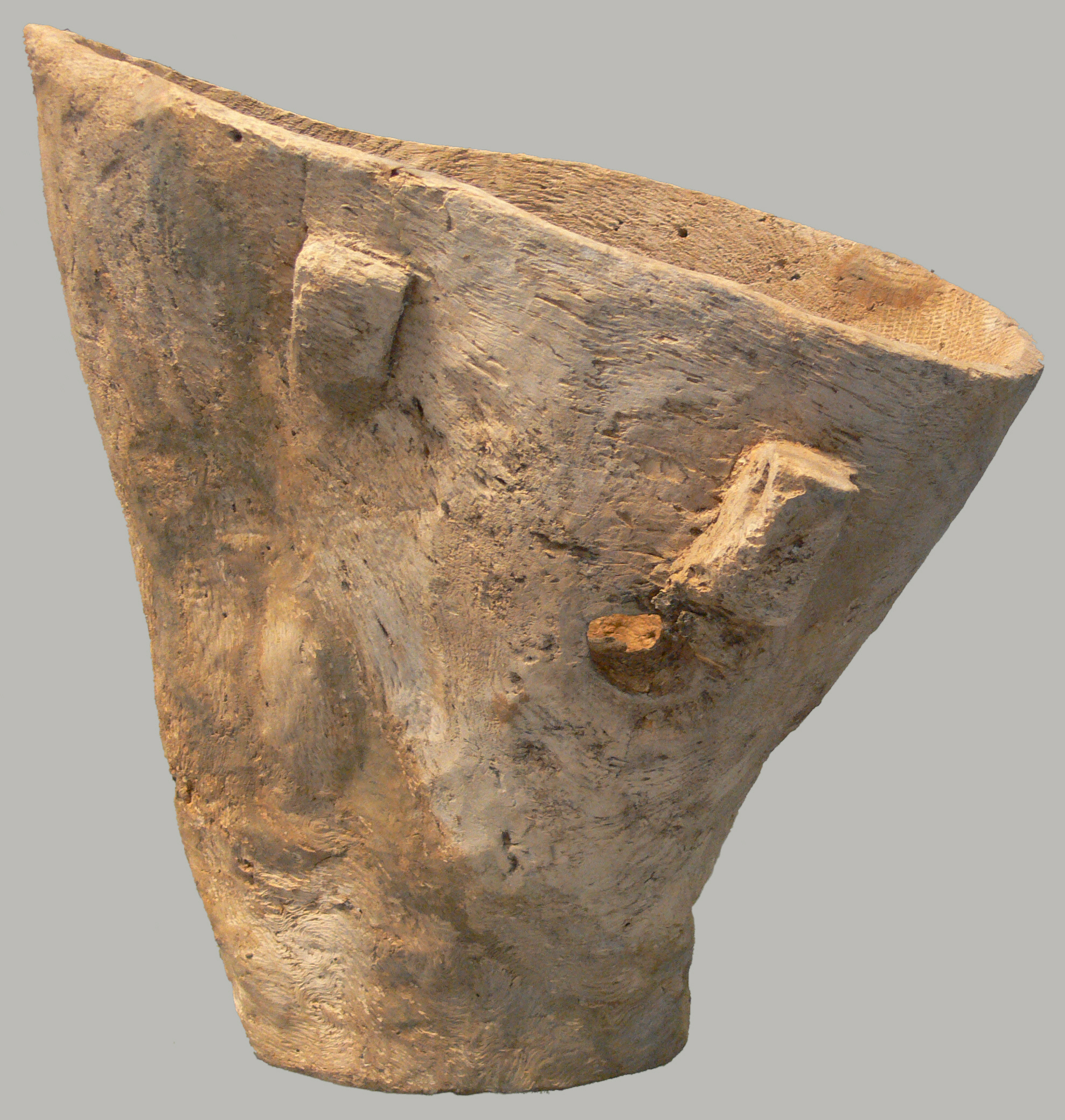
Neolithic wooden bucket, c. 3700 BC

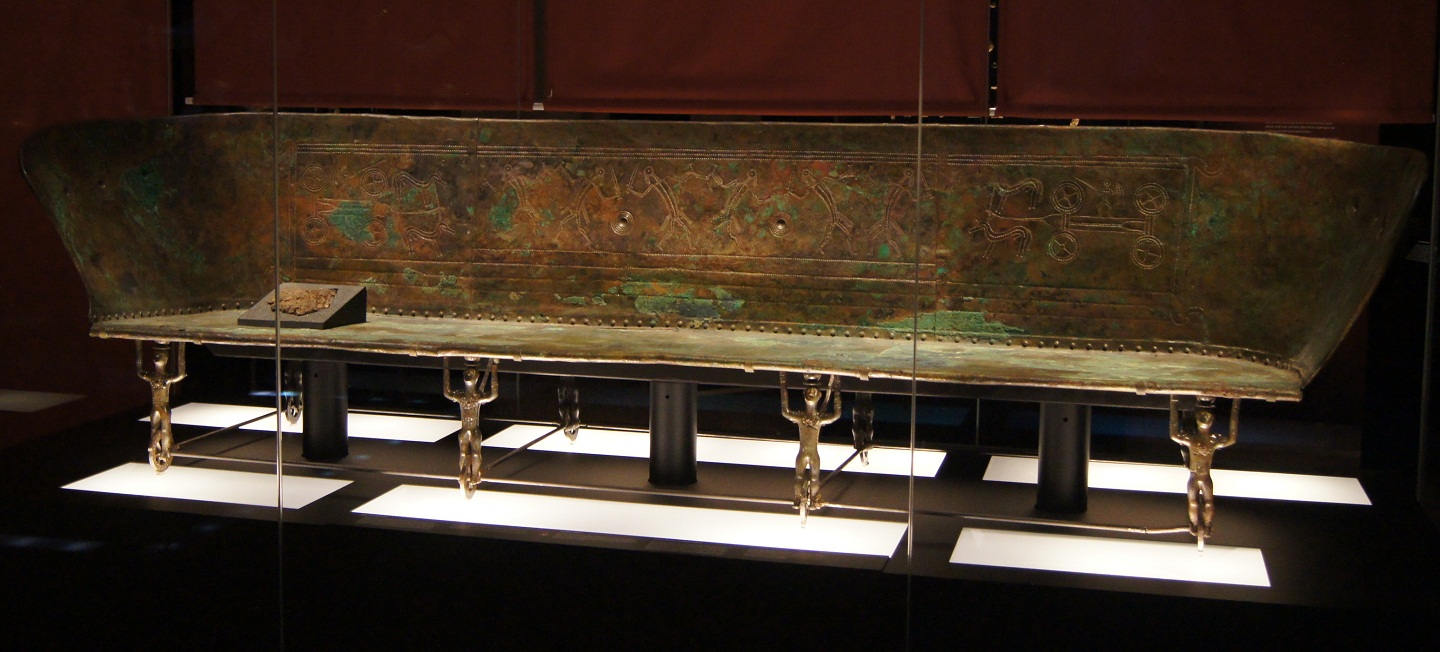
Celtic 'klinai', 550 BC

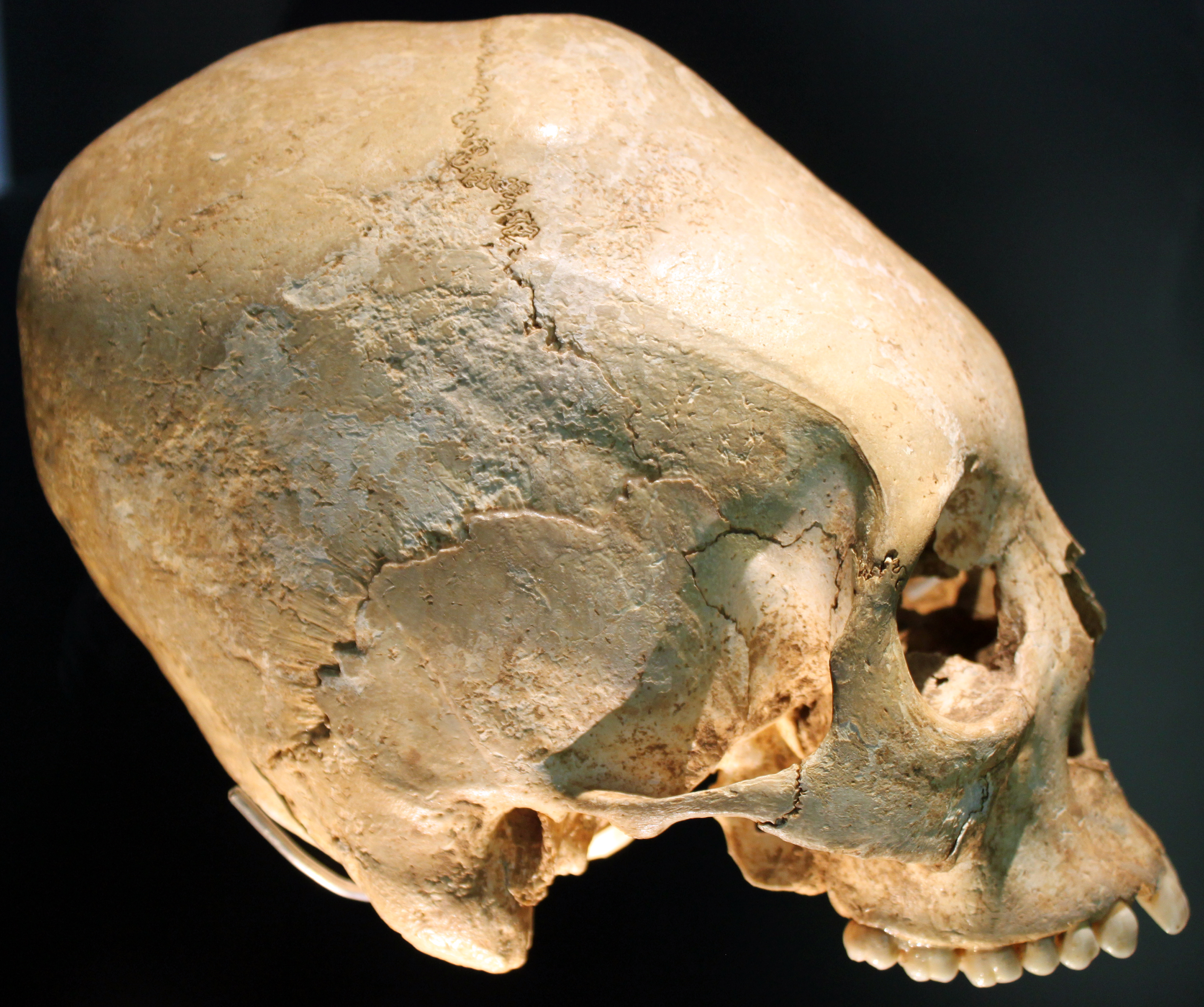
Turricephalus of a 30- to 40-year-old Alamannic woman of the early 6th century

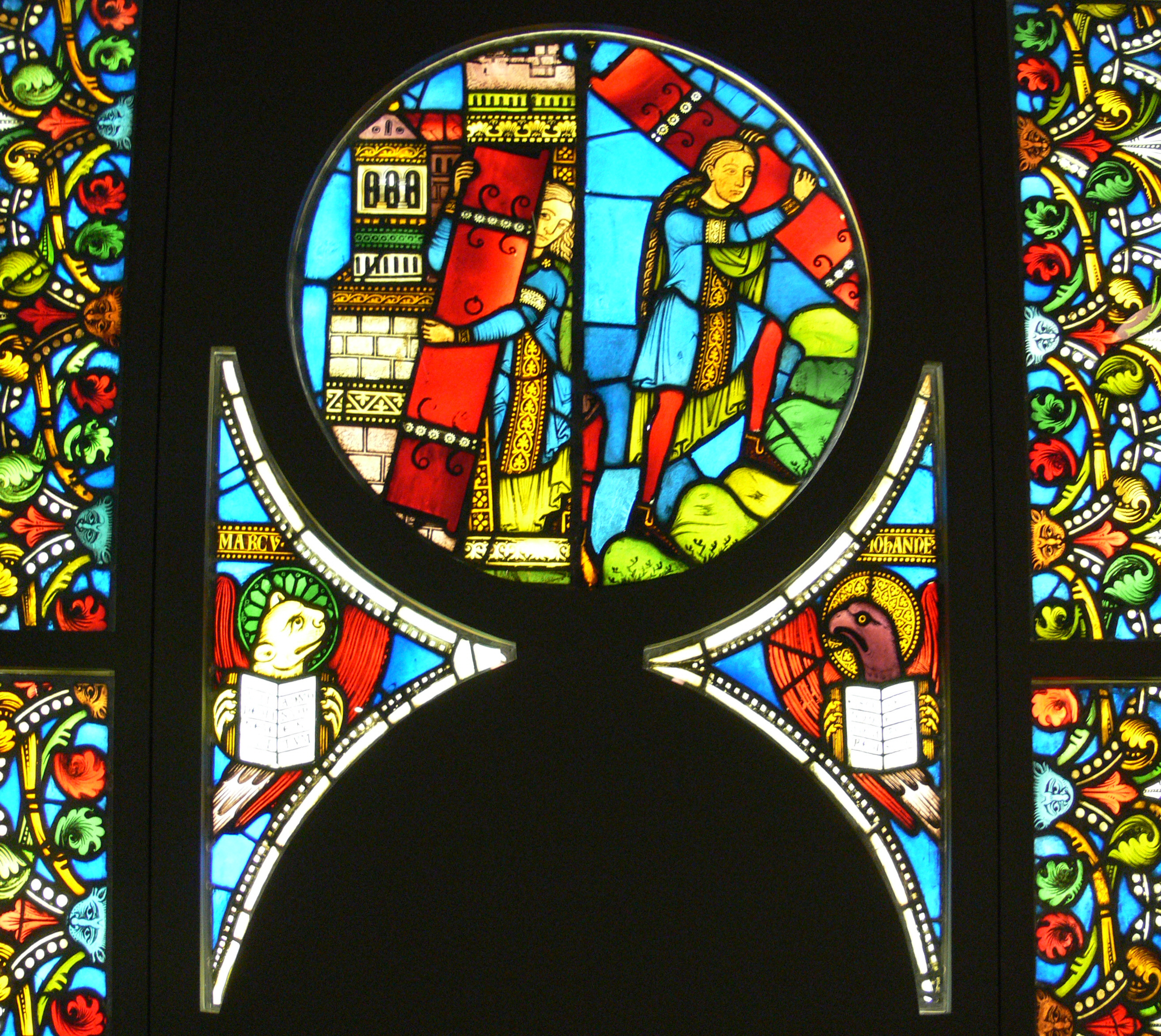
Glass window from Alpirsbach monastery, Strassburg, c. 1160–1170

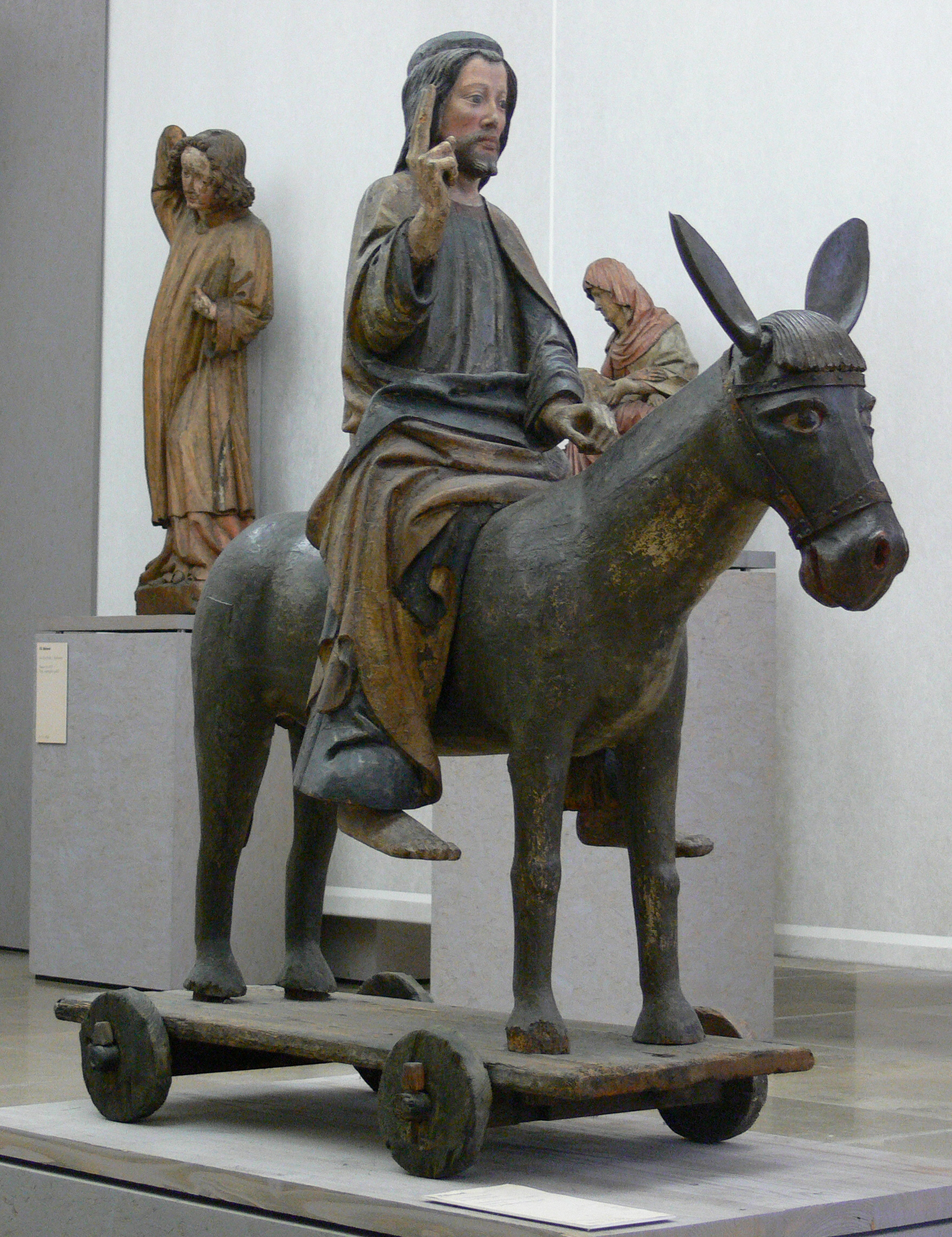
Jesus on donkey carving used for donkey walks, late 14th century

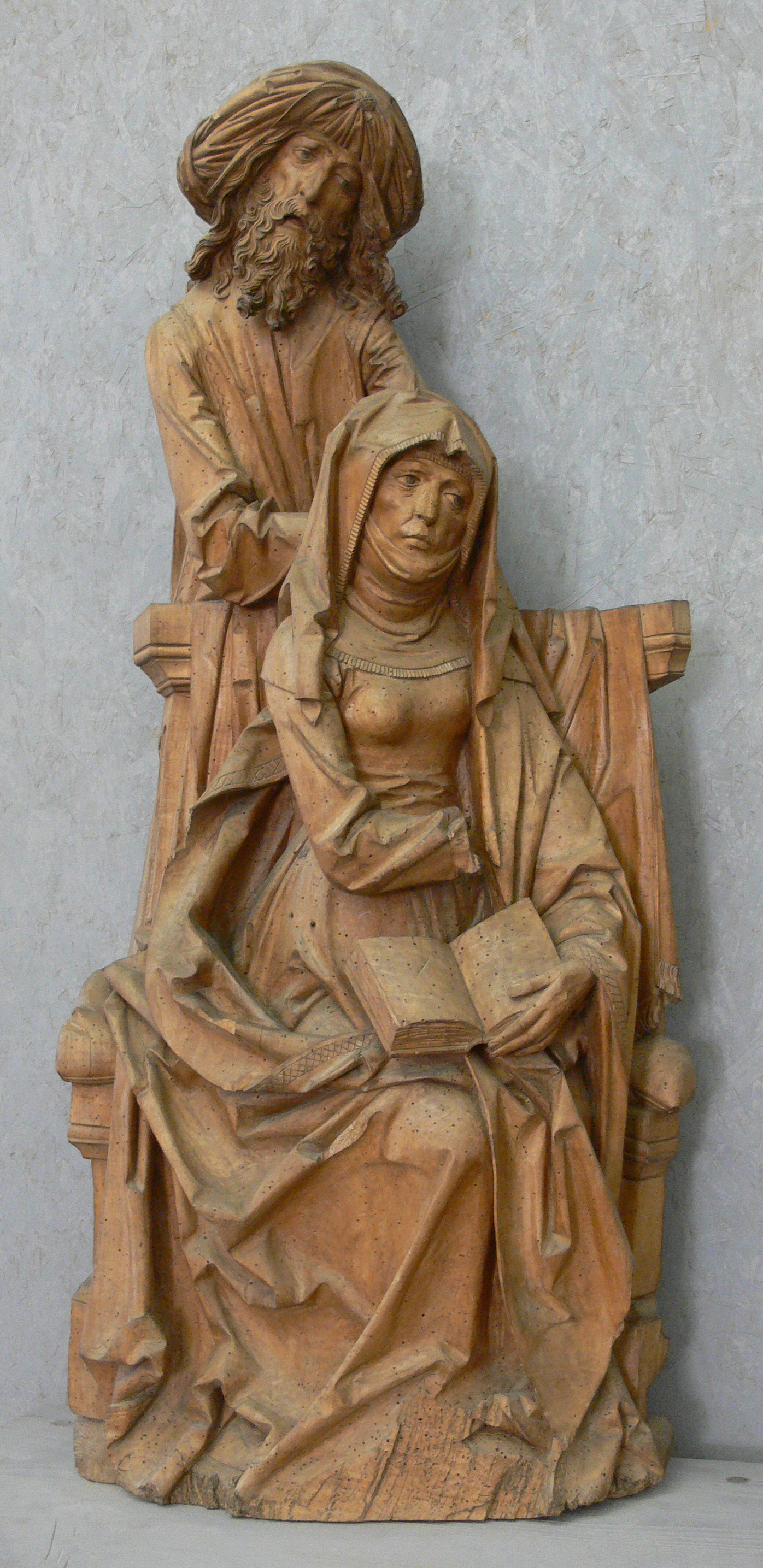
Maria Cleophae and Alphaeus by Tilman Riemenschneider, c. 1505–1510

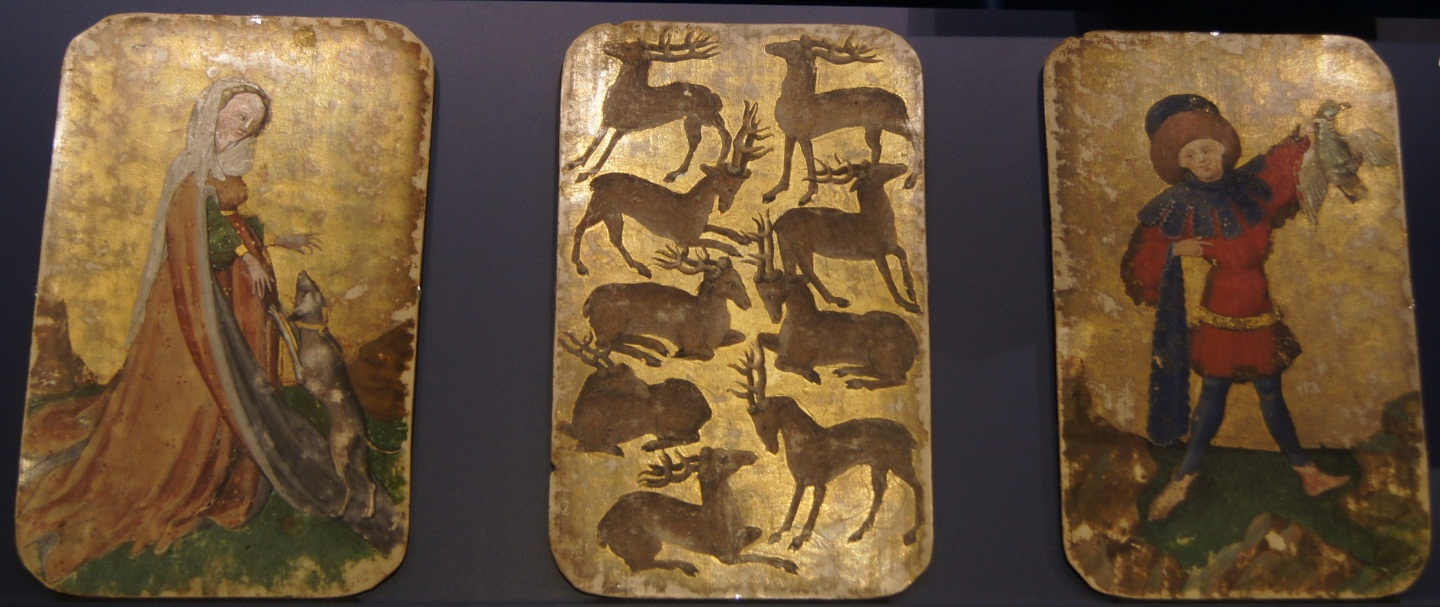
Stuttgart Kartenspiel, card game 15th century

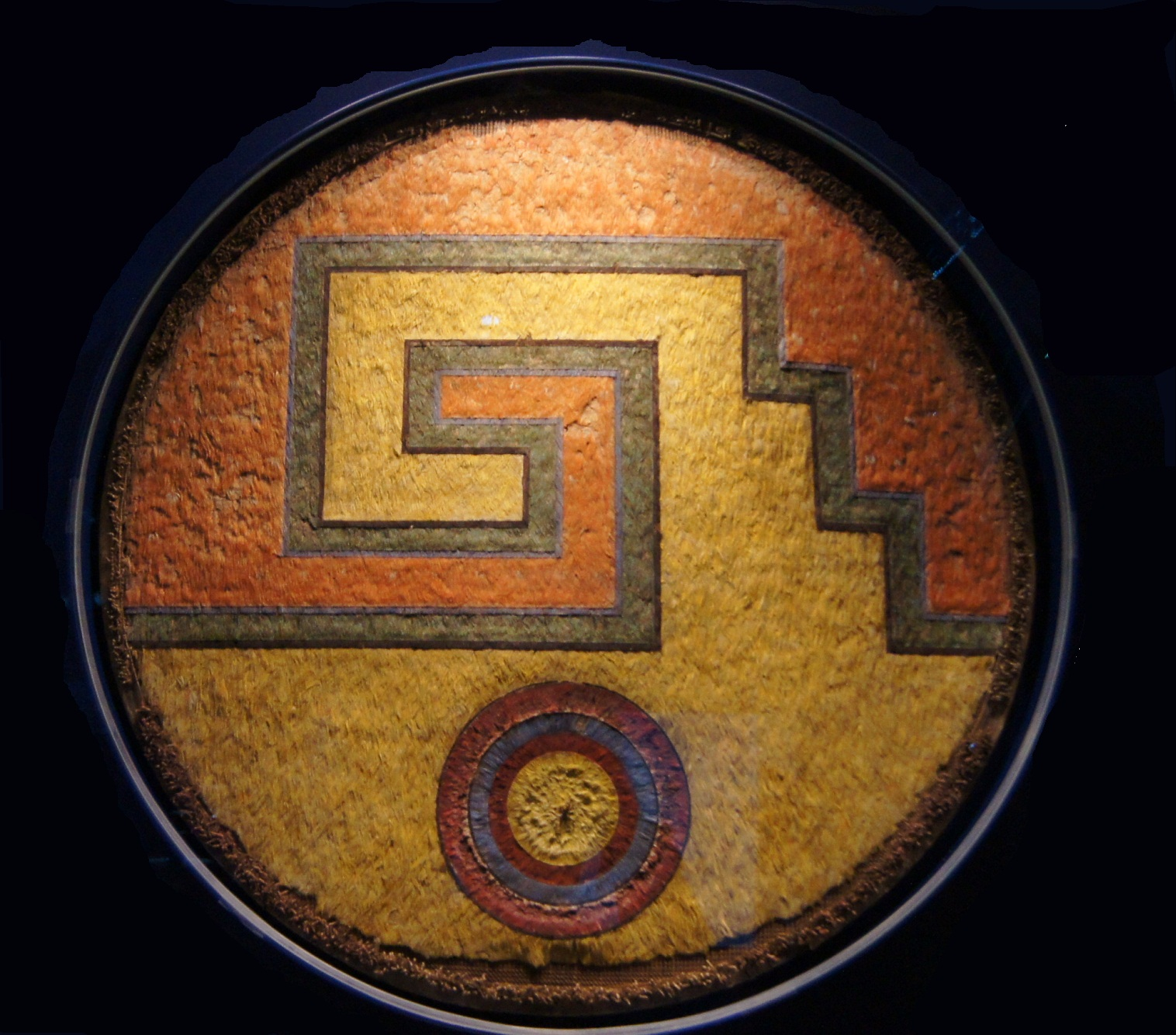
Aztec feather shield Meander and Sun c. 1520

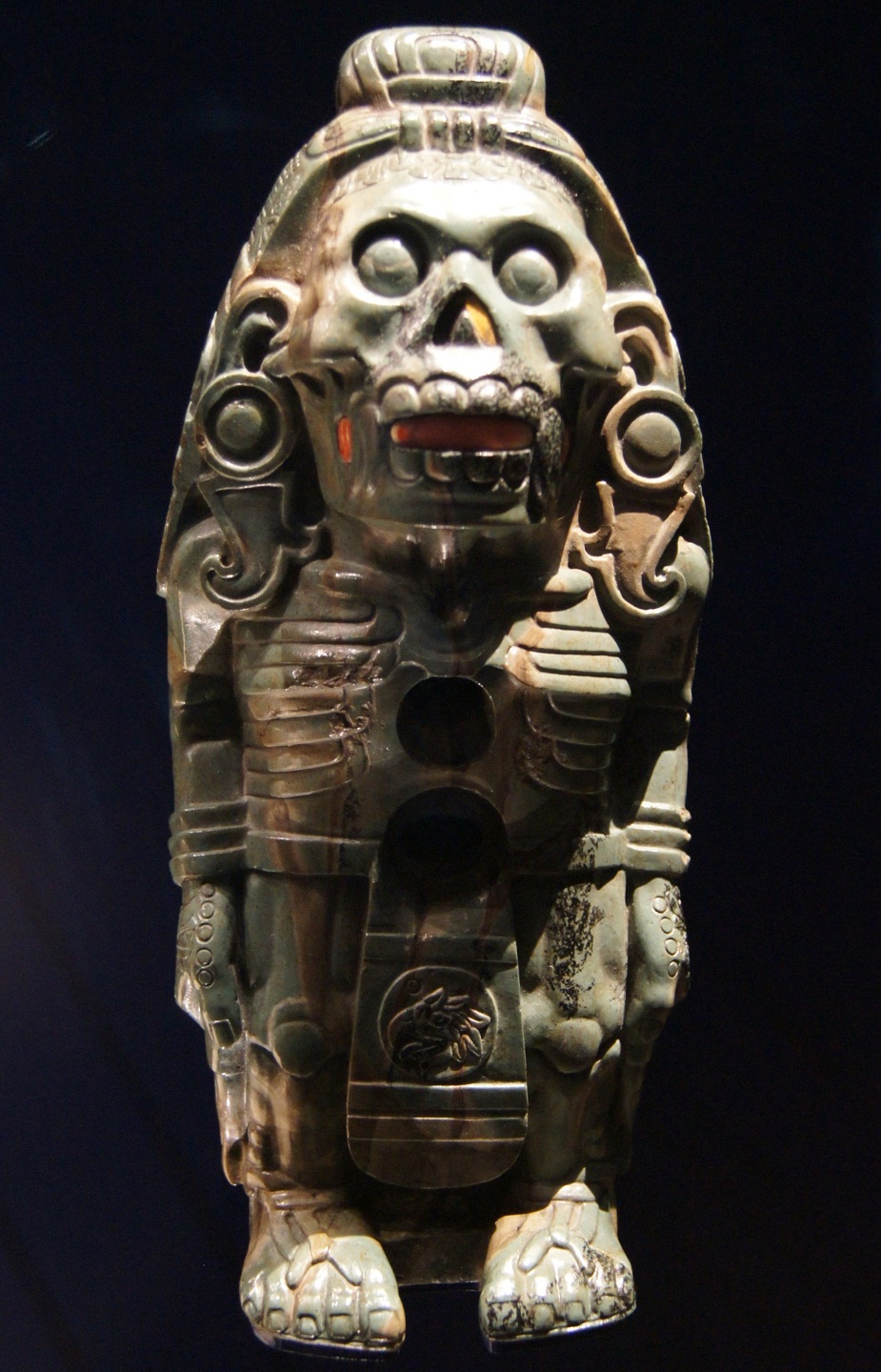
Aztec Xolotl, Mexico, 1500–1520

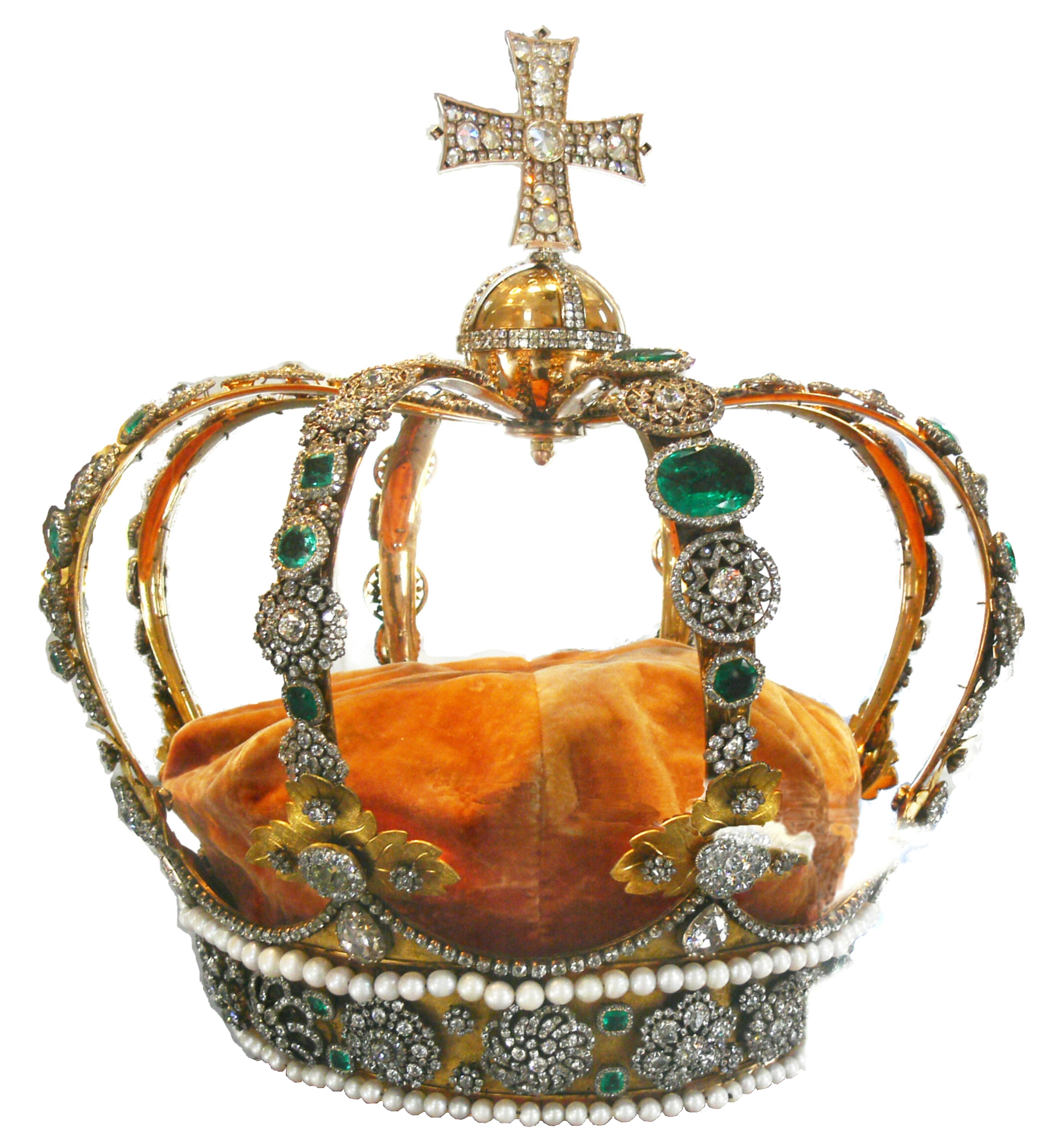
Württemberg Crown, 1797 with later modifications
