= Rottweil witch trials =

Witch trials in 16th–17th c. Rottweil, Swabia

- Location: Rottweil, Baden, Germany
- Date: 1546–1661
- Target: Accused users of witchcraft
- Deaths: 266

The Rottweil witch trials were a series of witch trials in the town of Rottweil in Swabia, a town in the Margraviate of Baden, a Holy Roman Empire city in what is now Germany, between 1546 and 1661. 234 women and 53 men were accused of witchcraft. Out of 287 accused, only 21 were found innocent, while the other 266 were killed. The majority of the victims were burned to death, although some were beheaded (which was becoming more 'fashionable' in the 16th century). 400 years later, the town pardoned the accused posthumously. A commemorative plaque was placed on the tower in the city, which was formerly a prison, to serve as a memorial for the victims of the trials.

== Known victims ==
- 1546 – Ottilia Pöttin burned to death
- 1546 – Agatha Seyfried burned to death
- 1546 – Walburga Posenberger burned to death
- 1546 – Walburga Zimmermann aus Rottenburg (Also known as Rottenburg am Neckar) burned to death
- 1547 – Anna Hermanns burned to death
- 1554 – Margaretha Weißbrot von Schemberg burned to death
- 1561 – Catharina Höhnmeyer burned to death
- 1561 – Margaretha Parnayer burned to death
- 1561 – Barbara Rebin von der Neuenburg burned to death
- 1566 – Elsa Rainherin aus Straßberg burned to death
- 1566 – Wilhelm Zorn aus Schwäbisch Gmünd beaten and burned to death
- 1569 – Margaretha Höhn burned to death
- 1569 – Anna Quatlender von Weiler burned to death
- 1571 – Catharina Strobenhauser aus Horb burned
- 1572 – Ursula aus der Wentin burned to death
- 1572 – Margaretha Reiderken burned to death
- 1572 – Barbara Vogler burned to death
- 1572 – Hans Kilian aus Pfullingen burned to death
- 1572 – Margaretha Stimler aus Waldmössingen burned to death
- 1572 – Petronellea Rein aus Trailfingen burned to death
- 1573 – Anna Kermann Witwe von Hans Bilgen burned to death
- 1573 – Waldpurga Dilgass genannt Faulhaberin burned to death
- 1574 – Margaretha Burg aus Binzwangen burned to death
- 1574 – Hans Baugen aus der Altstadt burned to death
- 1574 – Barbara Heinzmann burned to death
- 1574 – Margaretha Hochburger aus Ravensburg burned to death
- 1574 – Apollonia Winding von Sunderfingen burned to death
- 1574 – Barbara Egloff killed by unknown means
- 1575 – Margaretha Brig von Hangen burned to death
- 1576 – Ursula Rößler burned to death
- 1577 – Rosina Gräf burned to death
- 1579 – Barbara Nieth von Blattenhardt vor Hinrichtung branded and burned to death
- 1580 – Barbara Strom von Trossingen burned to death
- 1580 – Hans Engel gerädert dann burned to death
- 1580 – Michel Reitz von Ratshausen burned to death
- 1581 – Waldburga Heinzelmann von Schramberg burned to death
- 1582 – Paul Benz von Westhofen burned to death
- 1582 – Hans Dorn von Hasenweiler gerädert dann burned to death
- 1582 – Hans Heinrich Hessen von Lützelburg beaten then burned to death
- 1583 – Anna Möslin burned to death
- 1583 – Cordula Müller burned to death
- 1583 – Margaretha Rötlin burned to death
- 1584 – Ulrich Loschner von Metzingen burned to death
- 1584 – Michael Frieß ein Schmied burned to death
- 1584 – Hans Jacobs von Molspern burned to death
- 1585 – Apollonia Klug aus dem Blatterhaus burned to death
- 1585 – Margaretha Breller burned to death
- 1586 – Anna Werlin burned to death
- 1586 – Apollonia Marstall burned to death
- 1586 – deren Mann Hans Schürlin burned to death
- 1586 – Hans Reinhardt von Geißlingen bei Ulm burned to death
- 1586 – Matthias Kugel von Brienbach burned to death
- 1587 – Angesa Decker von Meßstetten burned to death
- 1587 – Anna Funck aus Erla unter Rosenfeld burned to death
- 1587 – Agnes Rosenberger burned to death
- 1588 – Anna Menin aus der Altstadt burned to death
- 1588 – Katharina Ruopp von Tailfingen burned to death
- 1588 – Margaretha Baurmännin von Schwenninge burned to death
- 1588 – Anna Scherlin burned to death
- 1588 – Agneta Petermann drowned
- 1588 – Daughter of Agneta Petermann drowned
- 1588 – Katharina Gender burned to death
- 1589 – Anna Kurt von Zeidlfingen burned to death
- 1590 – Salomea Herder burned to death
- 1590 – Conrad Haller burned to death
- 1590 – Barbara Zeller burned to death
- 1590 – Paula Biler von Pforra bei Eschingen burned to death
- 1590 – Thongius Schentzlin von Schwenningen burned to death
- 1591 – Hans Bosch von Wernsreute bei Ravensburg burned to death
- 1591 – Anna Vischer burned to death
- 1591 – Catharina Ackerknecht burned to death
- 1592 – Anna Schuler Witwe Folter dann Haft
- 1592 – Conrad Ernst von Reutlingen burned to death
- 1592 – Anna Probst burned to death
- 1592 – Brigitta Pöttlin burned to death
- 1592 – Martin Brienen burned to death
- 1592 – Verena Hundspissin von Tuttlingen burned to death
- 1592 – Ursula Häsin von Täbingen burned to death
- 1592 – Anna Stieling aus der Altstadt burned to death
- 1593 – Tobias Wirt aus Steißlingen beaten then burned to death
- 1593 – Martin Fritz aus Kemnat beaten then burned to death
- 1593 – Hans Schlieffer von Frittlingen beaten then burned to death
- 1593 – Heinrich Fausten aus dem Breisgau beaten then burned to death
- 1593 – Georg Finckhels aus dem Gunthartz beaten then burned to death
- 1593 – Hans Schmidt burned to death
- 1593 – Margaretha Waldkaff von Sigmaringen dem Dorf burned to death
- 1595 – Georg Jank von Mörspurg beaten then burned to death
- 1595 – Hans Wilden von Tüwingen beaten then burned to death
- 1595 – Anna Burdig von Tuningen burned to death
- 1595 – Barbara Pack von Bretingen burned to death
- 1595 – Margaretha Piekherna von Schleickhen burned to death
- 1595 – Jacob Striegel der Alte burned to death
- 1595 – Anna Wernitz burned to death
