= Rottweil =

Town in Baden-Württemberg, Germany

- Town
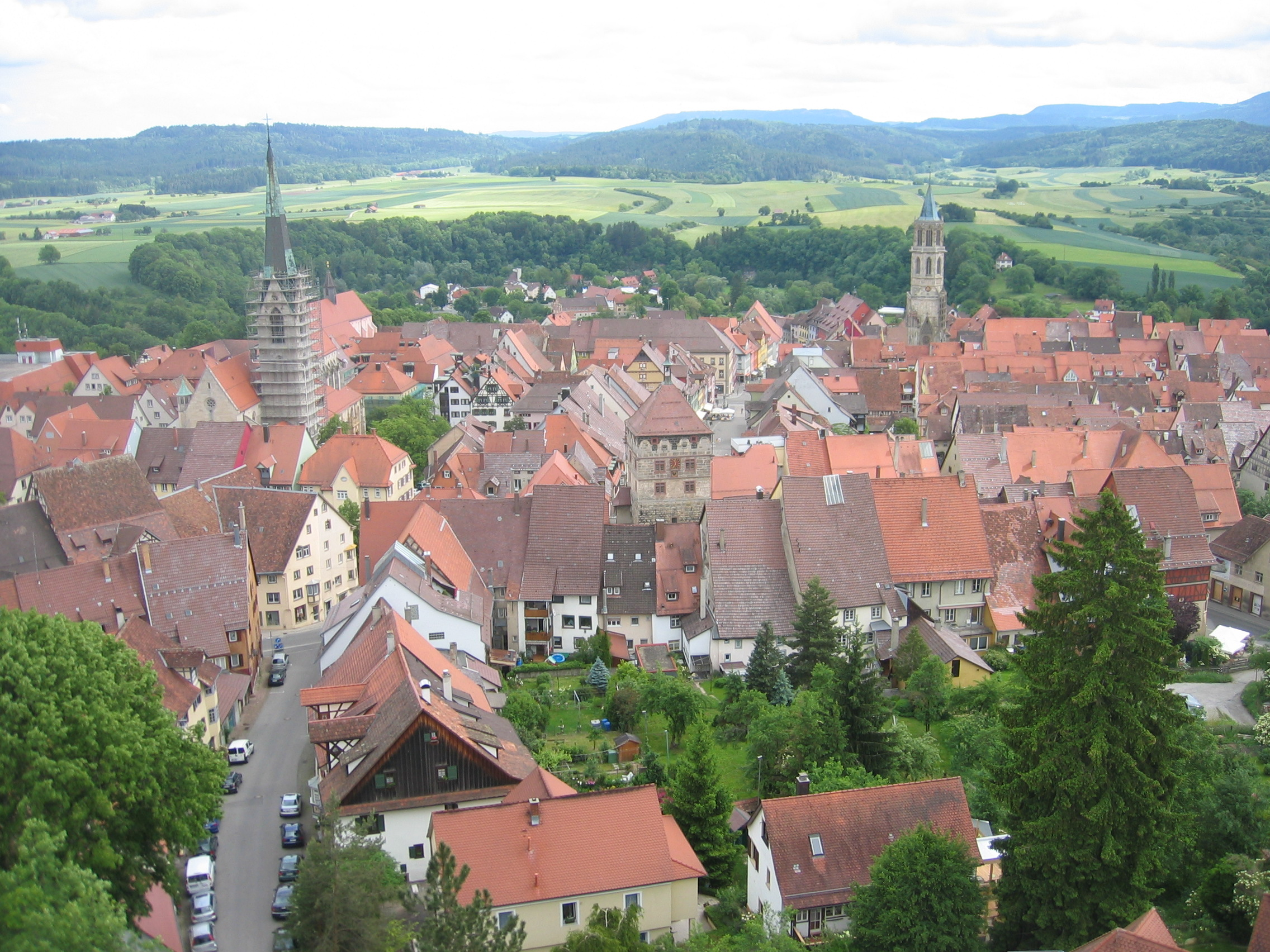
- A bird's-eye view of the whole city

- Coat of arms

- Location of Rottweil within Rottweil district
- Interactive map of Rottweil
- Location within Germany Location within Baden-Württemberg
- Coordinates: 48°10′5″N 8°37′29″E
- Country: Germany
- State: Baden-Württemberg
- Admin. region: Freiburg
- District: Rottweil

Government
  - Mayor (2022–30): Christian Ruf (CDU)

Area
  - Total: 71.76 km^{2} (27.71 sq mi)
- Elevation: 557–609 m (1,827–1,998 ft)

Population (2025-12-31)
  - Total: 25,001
  - Density: 348.4/km^{2} (902.3/sq mi)
- Time zone: UTC+01:00 (CET)
  - Summer (DST): UTC+02:00 (CEST)
- Postal codes: 78628, 78652 (Unterrotenstein)
- Dialling codes: 0741, 07427 (Neukirch)
- Vehicle registration: RW
- Website: www.rottweil.de

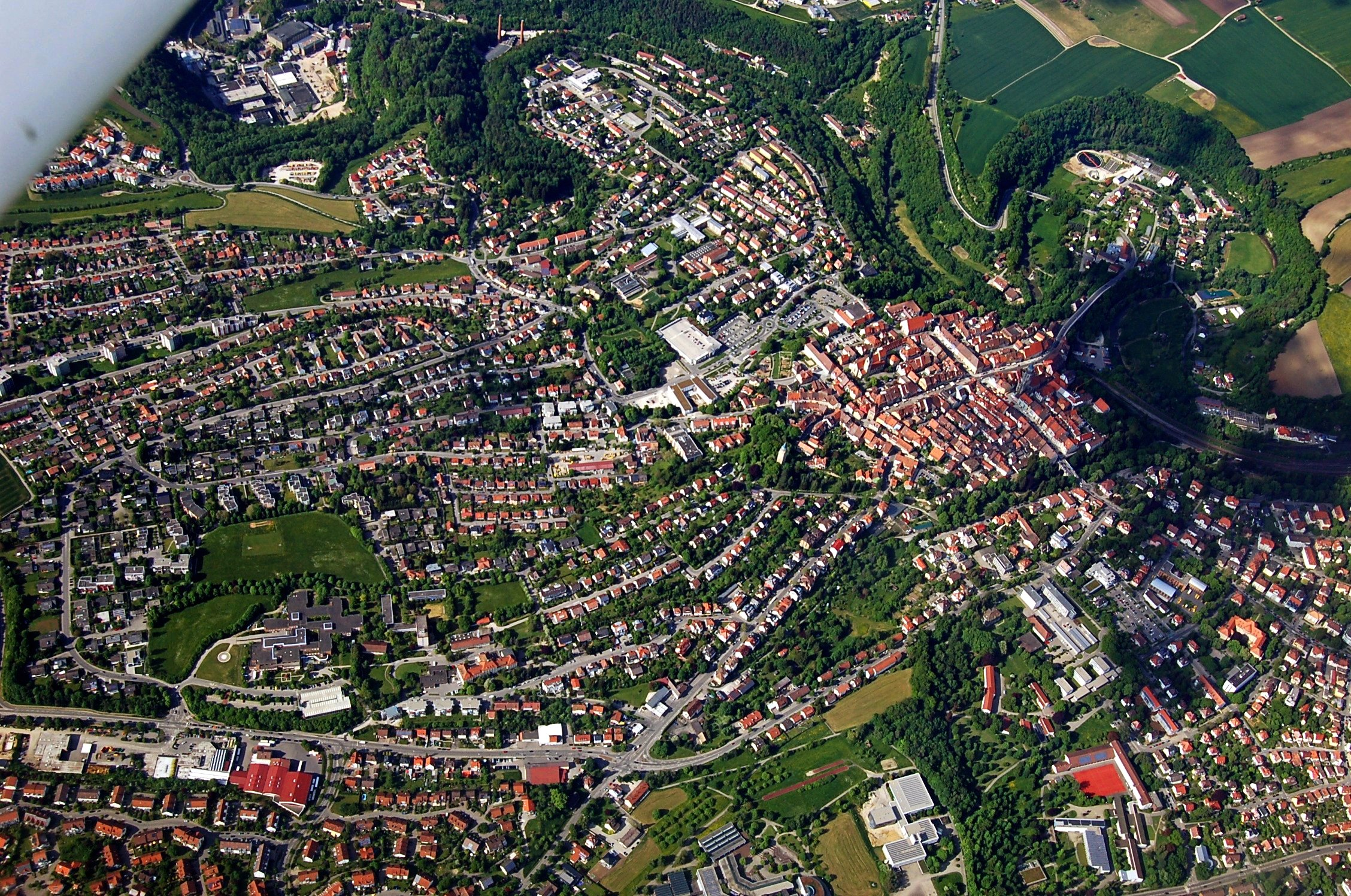
Aerial view

Rottweil (German: [ˈʁɔtvaɪl]; Alemannic: Rautweil) is a town in southwest Germany in the state of Baden-Württemberg. Rottweil was a free imperial city for nearly 600 years.

Located between the Black Forest and the Swabian Alps, Rottweil has a population of over 25,000 as of 2022. The town has a medieval center hosts a traditional carnival (called "Fasnet" in the local Swabian dialect). It is the oldest town in Baden-Württemberg, and its appearance has changed very little since the 16th century.

The town gives its name to the Rottweiler dog breed.

== History ==
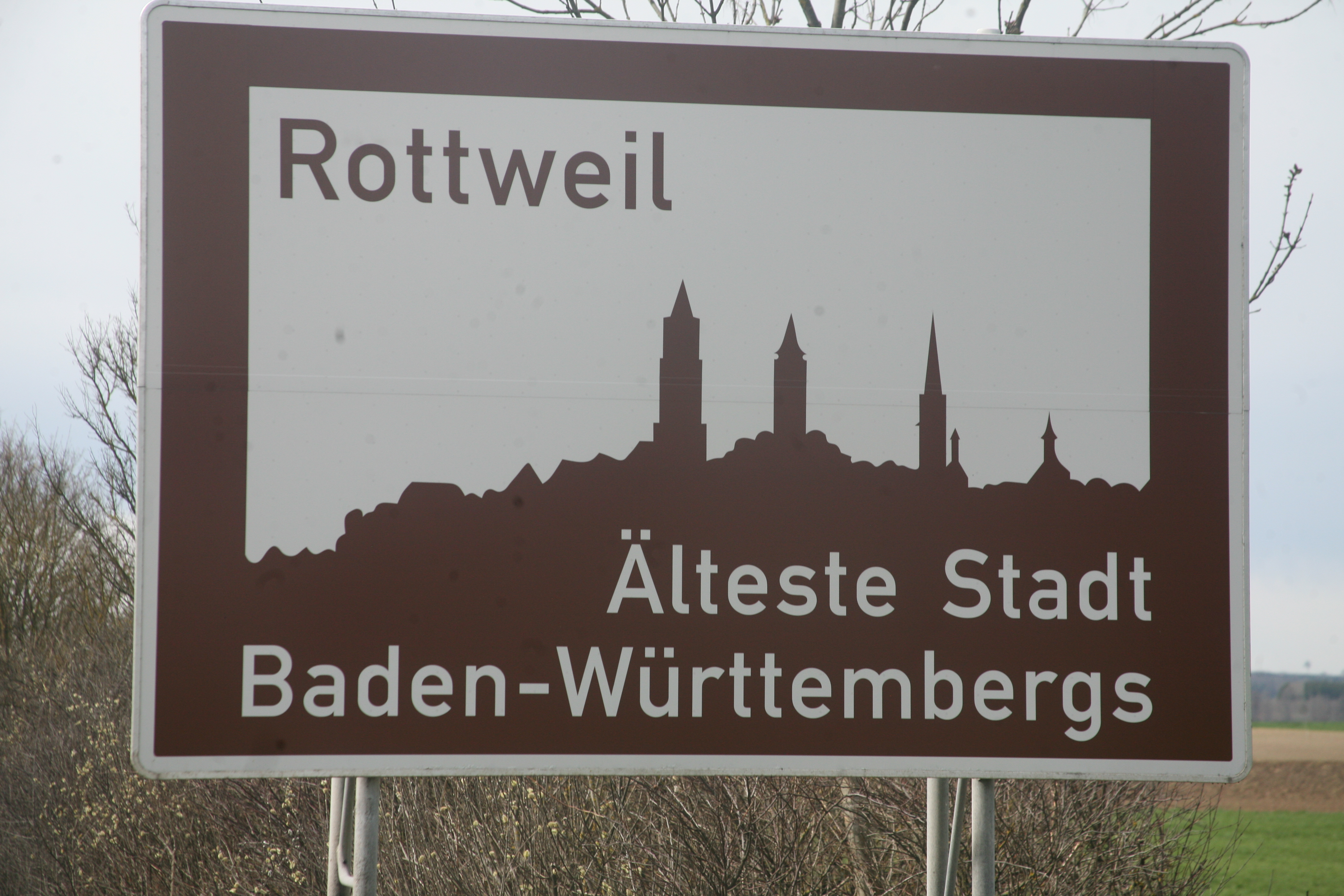
Tourist sign reading „Älteste Stadt Baden-Württembergs“ ("Oldest town of Baden-Württemberg")

Rottweil was founded by the Romans in AD 73 as Arae Flaviae and became a municipium, but there are traces of human settlement going back to 2000 BC. Roman baths and an Orpheus mosaic of c. AD 180 date from the time of Roman settlement. The present town became a ducal and a royal court before 771 and in 1268 it became a free imperial city.

In 1463 Rottweil joined the Swiss Confederacy under the pretence of a temporary alliance. In 1476 the Rottweilers fought on the Swiss side against Charles the Bold in the Battle of Morat. In 1512, Pope Julius II gave the city a valuable "Julius banner" for its services in the 1508–1510 "Great Pavier Campaign" to expel the French. In 1519, the Rottweilers left the old Swiss alliance. They joined a new one in which their membership was extended indefinitely – the so-called "Eternal Covenant".

Rottweil thus became a centre of the Swiss Confederation. The relations between the Swiss Confederation and Rottweil cooled rapidly during the Protestant Reformation. When Rottweil was troubled by wars, however, it still asked the Confederates for help.

In the Rottweil Witch Hunts from 1546 to 1661, 266 so-called witches, wizards and magicians were executed in the imperial city of Rottweil. On April 15, 2015, they were given a posthumous pardon. An official apology was given by the City Council about 400 years after their violent deaths.

Rottweil lost both its status as a free city and its alliance with the Swiss Confederacy with the conquest of the region by Napoleon in 1803.

== Climate ==
Climate data for Rottweil (1991-2020)
Month	Jan	Feb	Mar	Apr	May	Jun	Jul	Aug	Sep	Oct	Nov	Dec	Year
Daily mean °C (°F)	−0.1 (31.8)	0.4 (32.7)	3.9 (39.0)	7.8 (46.0)	12.1 (53.8)	15.7 (60.3)	17.6 (63.7)	17.2 (63.0)	12.9 (55.2)	8.8 (47.8)	3.8 (38.8)	0.7 (33.3)	8.4 (47.1)
Average precipitation mm (inches)	55.9 (2.20)	50.2 (1.98)	56.2 (2.21)	52.6 (2.07)	92.2 (3.63)	79.8 (3.14)	89.8 (3.54)	82.7 (3.26)	57.7 (2.27)	63.1 (2.48)	61.4 (2.42)	66.9 (2.63)	808.5 (31.83)
Mean monthly sunshine hours	66.9	89.4	135.2	172.9	199.1	217.8	234.8	220.8	164.1	117.5	70	58.4	1,748.9
Source: Deutscher Wetterdienst

== Economy ==
During the Middle Ages, Rottweil used to be a flourishing imperial city with great economic and cultural influence. In 1868, Rottweil was connected to Stuttgart by rail, which boosted the economy of the region.

Today, Many companies in Rottweil are either small or medium-sized, and Rottweil is known as a trading and shopping town with a, Rottweil is known for its industry.

At 7.9%, Rottweil has one of the highest academic rates in the region.

=== Media ===
Local events in Rottweil are reported in the daily newspaper Schwarzwälder Bote, the Stadtanzeiger, online and once a week in the print edition Neue Rottweiler Zeitung, the TV station Regio TV Bodensee and the local radio station antenne 1 Neckarburg Rock & Pop, which is based in the district.

== Infrastructure ==
=== Rail traffic ===
Rottweil station has regular (at least hourly) regional services to Stuttgart, Villingen, Singen, as well as many nearby towns. The hourly Stuttgart-Zurich intercity train also stops at Rottweil. In 2003, the Ringzug concept was established, providing rail service to many previously abandoned stations in the region between Villingen, Rottweil, Tuttlingen and Donaueschingen, which became a major success.

=== Road traffic ===
By car, Rottweil can be reached via the Bundesautobahn 81 Stuttgart-Singen, exit Rottweil. The city lies on the Bundesstraße 27 between Schaffhausen and Stuttgart, on the Bundesstraße 14, which runs from Stockach on Lake Constance via Tuttlingen to Rottweil and on via Horb am Neckar to Stuttgart, and on the Bundesstraße 462 from Rottweil through the Black Forest to Freudenstadt and Rastatt.

=== Bicycle traffic ===
Rottweil is located on the Neckartal-Radweg along the Neckar River via Horb, Tübingen, Stuttgart, Heilbronn and Heidelberg to Mannheim.

=== Air traffic ===
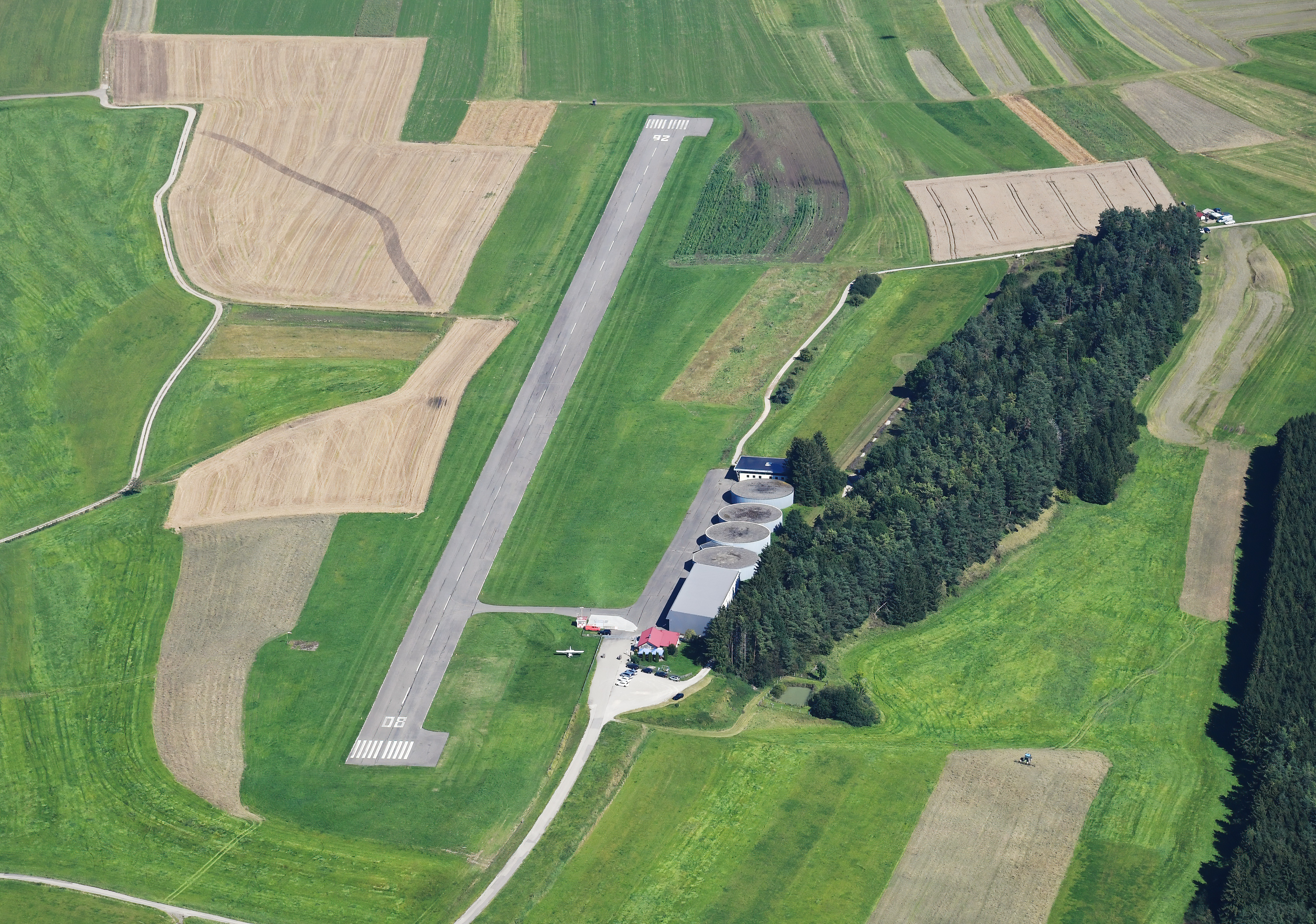
Rottweil-Zepfenhan airfield

In the neighbouring village of Zepfenhan, about 12 km (7.5 mi) away, is the Flugplatz Rottweil-Zepfenhan (Rottweil-Zepfenhan airfield), which can be approached by small aircraft. The nearest commercial airports are Stuttgart Airport and Zurich Airport.

== Education ==
Rottweil has three Gymnasien (Albertus-Magnus-Gymnasium, Droste-Hülshoff-Gymnasium, Leibniz-Gymnasium), one Realschule, one Förderschule (Achert-Schule), three Grundschulen (Eichendorff-Grundschule, Grundschule Neufra and Grundschule Neukirch), and four Hauptschulen (GHS Göllsdorf, Johanniter-Grund- und Hauptschule, Konrad-Witz-Grund- und Hauptschule and Römer-Grund- und Hauptschule).

== Main sights ==
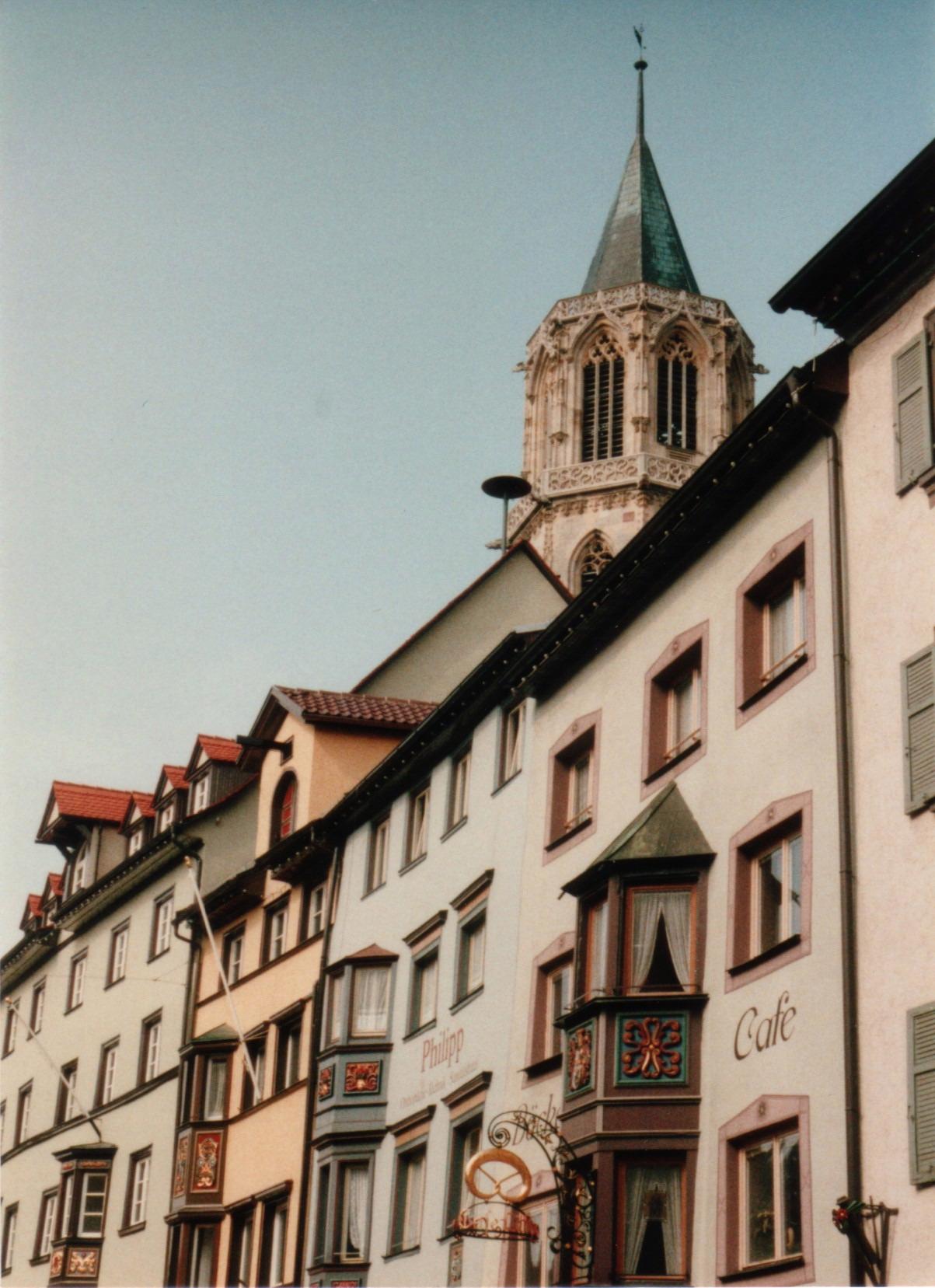
Main Street

- The late-Romanesque and Gothic–era Münster Heiliges Kreuz ("Minster of the Holy Cross"), built over a pre-existing church from 1270. It features a crucifix by Veit Stoss and noteworthy Gothic sculptures.
- Kapellenkirche (1330–1340), a Gothic church with a tower and with three statue-decorated portals
- Lorenzkapelle ("Church of St. Lawrence", 16th century) in late Gothic style. It houses some two hundred works by Swabian masters and Gothic altarpieces from the 14th and 15th centuries.
- The town's museum, including a notable Roman mosaic with the legend of Orpheus
- The late-Gothic town hall (1521)
- St. Pelagius, a Romanesque church from the 12th century. Excavations have brought to light Roman baths on the same site.
- Dominican Museum of Rottweil – local branch of the Landesmuseum Württemberg
- ThyssenKrupp constructed a $45 million, 807-foot (246 m) tower, the Rottweil Test Tower. The tower is a research facility for the company and is used to test new elevator cars and technologies. When the tower was completed in 2017, it was the tallest elevator test tower in the world. (Note: There are higher elevator test towers now, see List of elevator test towers.) The tower has 12 elevator shafts.

== Twin towns – sister cities ==
Rottweil is twinned with:

- L'Aquila, Italy
- Brugg, Switzerland
- Hyères, France
- Imst, Austria

== Notable people ==
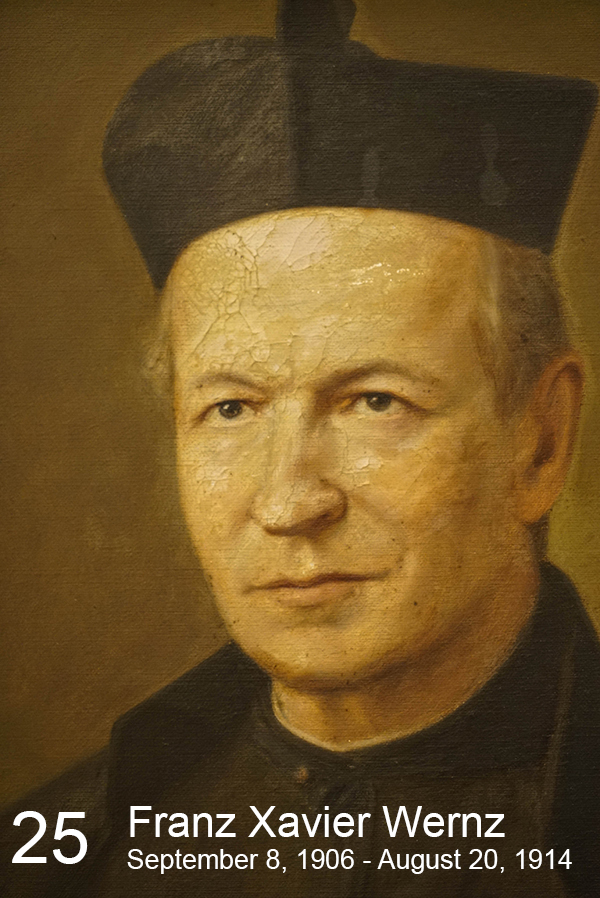
Franz Xavier Wernz, 1910

- Konrad Witz (1400/10–1445/46), painter, active mainly in Basel.
- Adam of Rottweil, 15th-century scholar and printer
- Johann Georg Herbst (1787–1836), a German Orientalist.
- Franz Xavier Wernz (1842–1914), the 25th Superior General of the Society of Jesus
- Rüdiger Safranski (born 1945), philosopher, writer and literary scholar
- Johannes Erath (born 1975), opera director

=== Politics ===
- Heike Heubach (born 1979), politician (SPD); she is deaf
- Andreas Schwab (born 1973), politician (CDU) and member of the European Parliament
- Erwin Teufel (born 1939), politician (CDU), former minister president of Baden-Württemberg
- Stefan Teufel (born 1972), politician

=== Music ===
- Avralize (formed 2023), metalcore band
- Anne Haigis (born 1955), musician, singer and songwriter
- Matthias Hölle (born 1951), opera bass
- Wolfgang Stryi (1957–2005), jazz musician, composer, clarinetist and tenor saxophonist

=== Sports ===
- Klaus-Dieter Sieloff (1942–2011), footballer, brought up locally, played 338 games and 14 for West Germany
- brothers Marcus Trick (born 1977) & Armon Trick (born 1978), retired international rugby union players
- Simone Hauswald (born 1979), a former biathlete and bronze medallist at the 2010 Winter Olympics
- Markus Fuchs (born 1980), footballer who played over 300 games
- Christoph Burkard (born 1983), Paralympic swimmer, medallist at the 2004 & 2012 Summer Paralympics
- Maximiliane Rall (born 1993), footballer, played over 200 games and 9 for Germany women
- Joshua Kimmich (born 1995), footballer, played over 640 games and 107 for Germany

== Trivia ==
- The Rottweiler dog breed is named after this town; it used to be a butcher's dog in the region.
- "Das Mädchen aus Rottweil" is a song by the German band Die Toten Hosen.

== See also ==
- Rottweil (district)
- Synagoge Rottweil
