= Adam of Rottweil =

15th-century printer and pupil of Gutenberg

Adam of Rottweil, (German: Adam von Rottweil; Italian: Adamo de Rodvila (Rottweil 14?? - L'Aquila 1???) was a fifteenth century scholar and printer. He was originally a pupil and collaborator of Johannes Gutenberg. In 1477 Adam published in Venice one of the first German-Italian dictionaries. This work was clearer and better organized compared with the first German-Venetian dictionary published in 1424 by Georg von Nürnberg. He was working to recreate the alphabet of Roman inscriptions, something that he completed circa 1460. In 1481 Adam obtained permission to establish a printing press in L'Aquila.

== Biography ==
Better known in Italy as Adamo da Rottweil (or Rotwil), he was a student and collaborator of Johannes Gutenberg, the inventor of movable-type printing. With Gutenberg's permission, he established a printing press in L'Aquila, where he settled in October 1481. On 5 November of the same year he also obtained authorization from the city magistrate and began his activity as a printer.

Burkardt's printing press was the first in the Kingdom of Naples and the third in Italy after those established in Venice (1469) and Foligno (1470). Its establishment strengthened the prestige and economic power of L'Aquila, which at the time became the second most important city of the kingdom after the capital, Naples. The first two incunabula printed in the city are still preserved at the Biblioteca provinciale Salvatore Tommasi.

Because of this historical connection, in 1988 the cities of Rottweil and L'Aquila formalized an institutional twinning, and a German delegation is regularly present during the procession of the Perdonanza Celestiniana. In L'Aquila, several cultural institutions and workshops are named after the German printer, and a street in the historic centre has also been dedicated to him, marked by a commemorative plaque.

== Works ==
Introito e porta de quele che voleno imparare e comprender todescho o latino, cioè taliano, Venice 1477
