= Marcus Trick =

German rugby union player (born 1977)

- Born: Marcus Trick; January 5, 1977 (age 49) Rottweil, Germany
- Height: 1.84 m (6 ft 0 in)
- Weight: 115 kg (18 st 2 lb)

Rugby union career
- Position: Prop
Amateur team(s)
Years	Team	Apps	(Points)
2005–2013	SC Neuenheim		
2004–2004	RC L'Hospitalet		
1999–2004	SC Neuenheim		
1994–1998	RC Rottweil		
- Correct as of 20 March 2009
International career
Years	Team	Apps	(Points)
2000–2010	Germany	20	(0)
- Correct as of 21 February 2010

Marcus Tricker (born 5 January 1977) is a former German international rugby union player, playing for the SC Neuenheim in the Rugby-Bundesliga and the German national rugby union team.

== Biography ==
Marcus Trick, born in Rottweil, started playing rugby when he was 17 years old in 1994, joining local club RC Rottweil. In 1999 he and his younger brother Armon Trick signed with SC Neuenheim. Since then he played for the SC Neuenheim, except when he spent four months with the Spanish club RC L'Hospitalet in 2004.

He earned his first cap for Germany in 2000 against Ukraine and played 20 times for Germany since then. His greatest success as a national team player was the promotion to Division 1 of the European Nations Cup in 2008. He was finally capped for Germany in 2010 against Romania.

On domestic level, he won two German championships with his club team in 2003 and 2004 and made losing appearances in the 2001 finals against DRC Hannover and again in 2006 against RG Heidelberg and 2013 against Heidelberger RK.

At the end of the 2011–2012 season it has been speculated that he and his brother would both end their career. Despite those rumors Marcus was still a member of the SCN squad in season 2012/2013 and regularly lined up in the Bundesliga. The lost championship final in 2013 turned out to be his last appearance in the Bundesliga as he announced his resignation during the 2013/2014 preseason.

== Honours ==
=== Club ===
- German rugby union championship
  - Winner: 2003, 2004
  - Runners up: 2001, 2006, 2013
- German rugby union cup
  - Winner: 1999, 2001
  - Runners up: 2002, 2010

=== National team ===
- European Nations Cup - Division 2
  - Champions: 2008

== Stats ==
Marcus Trick's personal statistics in club and international rugby:

=== Club ===
Year	Club	Division	Games	Tries	Con	Pen	DG	Place
2008–2009	SC Neuenheim	Rugby-Bundesliga	16	3	0	0	0	3rd — Semi-finals
2009–2010	SC Neuenheim	Rugby-Bundesliga	16	1	0	0	0	5th
2010–2011	SC Neuenheim	Rugby-Bundesliga	12	0	0	0	0	5th
2011–2012	SC Neuenheim	Rugby-Bundesliga	18	1	0	0	0	4th — Semi-finals
2011–2013	SC Neuenheim	Rugby-Bundesliga	18	1	0	0	0	2nd — Runners up

- As of 10 April 2015

=== National team ===
==== European Nations Cup ====
Year	Team	Competition	Games	Points	Place
2006–2008	Germany	European Nations Cup Second Division	2	0	Champions
2008–2010	Germany	European Nations Cup First Division	1	0	6th — Relegated

==== Friendlies & other competitions ====
Year	Team	Competition	Games	Points
2008	Germany	Friendly	1	0
2009	Germany	Friendly	1	0

- As of 25 February 2010
