= Armon Trick =

German rugby union player

- Born: Armon Trick; February 4, 1978 (age 48) Rottweil, Germany
- Height: 1.98 m (6 ft 6 in)
- Weight: 115 kg (18 st 2 lb)

Rugby union career
- Position: Lock
Amateur team(s)
Years	Team	Apps	(Points)
- SC Neuenheim
–	RC Rottweil		
–	RC Strasbourg		
–	RC Rottweil		
- Correct as of 20 March 2009
International career
Years	Team	Apps	(Points)
2005	Germany	2	(0)
- Correct as of 20 March 2009

Armon Trick (born 4 February 1978 in Rottweil, Germany) is a retired German international rugby union player, formerly playing for the SC Neuenheim in the Rugby-Bundesliga and the German national rugby union team.

== Biography ==
Armon Trick, born in Rottweil, started playing rugby when he was 16 years old in 1994, joining local club RC Rottweil. After spending a season with RC Strasbourg in France he came back to play together with his older brother Marcus Trick for RC Rottweil again. In 1999 he and his brother signed with SC Neuenheim.

He earned his first cap for Germany in 2005 and played 2 times for Germany since then.

On domestic level, he won two German championships with his club team in 2003 and 2004 and made losing appearances in the 2001 finals against DRC Hannover and again in 2006 against RG Heidelberg.

At the end of the 2011-12 season he decided to retire from playing rugby.

== Honours ==
=== Club ===
- German rugby union championship
  - Winner: 2003, 2004
  - Runners up: 2001, 2006
- German rugby union cup
  - Winner: 1999, 2001
  - Runners up: 2002, 2010

== Stats ==
Armon Trick's personal statistics in club and international rugby:

=== Club ===
Year	Club	Division	Games	Tries	Con	Pen	DG	Place
2008-09	SC Neuenheim	Rugby-Bundesliga	11	0	0	0	0	3rd — Semi-finals
2009-10	SC Neuenheim	Rugby-Bundesliga	15	1	0	0	0	5th
2010-11	SC Neuenheim	Rugby-Bundesliga	13	1	0	0	0	5th
2011-12	SC Neuenheim	Rugby-Bundesliga	9	0	0	0	0	4th — Semi-finals

- As of 30 April 2012
