= Rottweil Synagogue =

Former synagogue in Rottweil, Baden-Württemberg, Germany

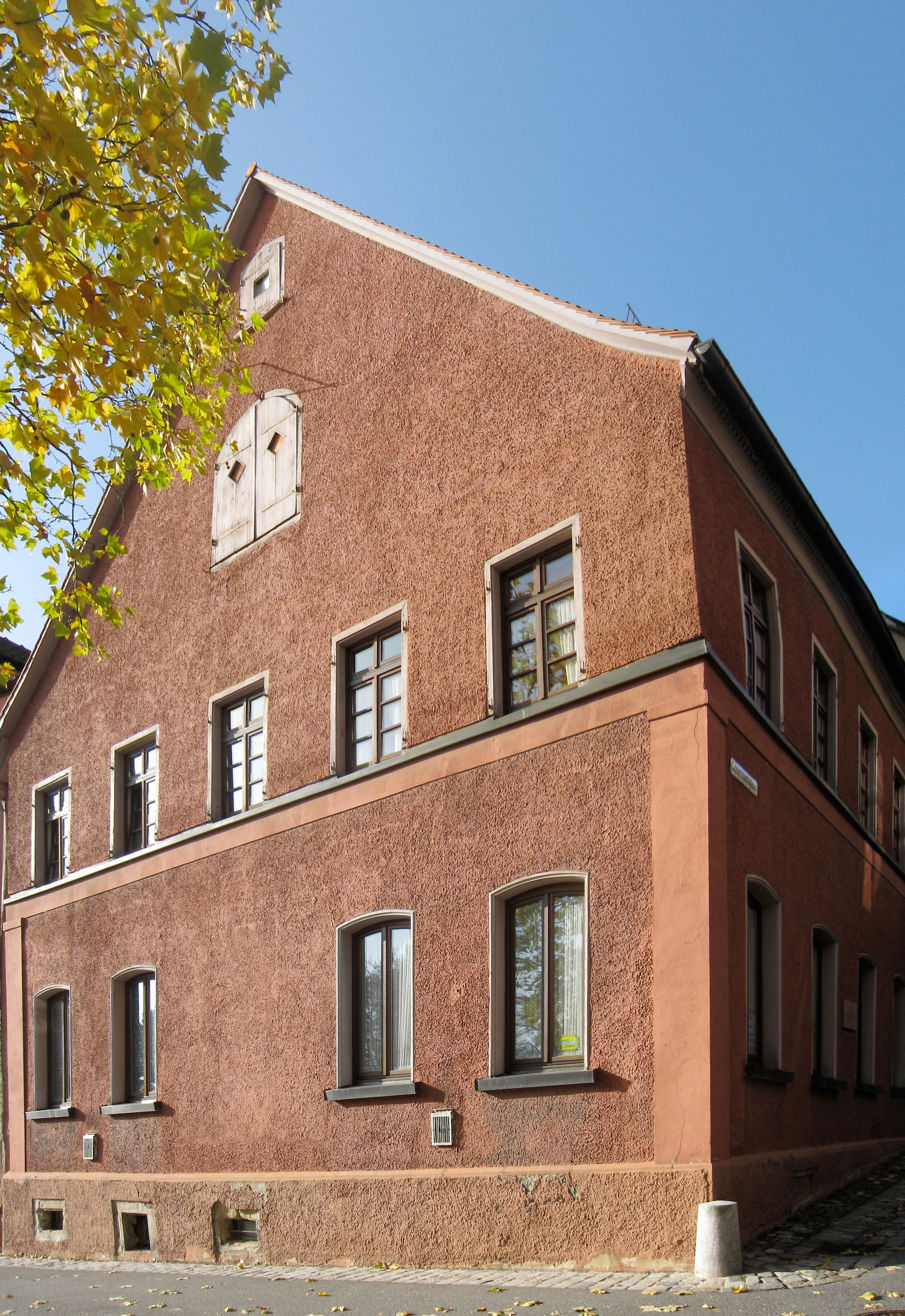
- The former synagogue, in 2009

- Location of the former synagogue in Baden-Württemberg

Religion
- Affiliation: Judaism (former)
- Rite: Nusach Ashkenaz
- Ecclesiastical or organisational status: Synagogue (1861–1938)
- Status: Desecrated; Repurposed

Location
- Location: Kameralamtsgasse 6, Rottweil, Baden-Württemberg
- Country: Germany
- Coordinates: 48°10′01″N 8°37′44″E

Architecture
- Type: Residential architecture
- Style: Neoclassical
- Established: 14th century (as a congregation)
- Completed: 1861
- Destroyed: November 1938 (during Kristallnacht

Specifications
- Direction of façade: West
- Capacity: 100 worshippers
- Length: 12 m (39 ft)
- Width: 12 m (39 ft)
- Materials: Rubblestone (lower level); Plastered half-timber (upper)

The Rottweil Synagogue was a former Jewish congregation and synagogue, located in Rottweil, in the state of Baden-Württemberg, Germany. Completed in 1861, the synagogue was destroyed by Nazis during Kristallnacht, on November 9, 1938. The desecrated synagogue is located in Kameralamtsgasse 6, former Judengasse, close to Kapellenkirche and next to Bischöfliches Konvikt and gymnasium. The building was used as the Hartmut Benk driving school (German: Fahrschule) up until 2019.

In March 2015, the congregation began construction of a new synagogue.

== History ==
There was a Jewish community in the 14th century; however, there is no proof of a synagogue. In 1349, Black death led to slaughters of Jews across Europe, including in Rottweil. Judengasse and Judenschule (“Jews’ school”, that is to say, synagogue) are documented in 1355, a Judenbad (mikvah) before 1838. In 1806, a younger Jewish community in Rottweil was founded as a branch of Mühringen. In 1924 the Israelitische Gemeinde Rottweil, the Jewish community, became independent.

In 1813 Jews in Rottweil asked Frederick I of Württemberg for the profaned church of St John the Baptist in order to establish a synagogue there. The church was part of the former Kommende of Knights Hospitaller. In 1861, the Synagogenbauverein acquired the building from the former mayor Dr. Rapp and furnished it with a prayer room the same year. In 1865, the Jewish commune in Rottweil bought the building. A description is given by Dr. Michael Silberstein in 1875. It was completely renovated in the 1920s. During Kristallnacht in 1938, the prayer room was demolished by members of the SA. They also burned the Torah on the street. Memorial plaques with the names of Jewish soldiers in World War I were destroyed.

Due to a forced confiscation in December 1938, the Israelitische Kirchengemeinde in Rottweil sold the synagogue, including a teacher's apartment, to Wilhelm Ziefle, a businessman in Rottweil. A Jewish merchant, Wilhelm Wälder, was allowed to stay until 1939.

His wife Emilie Wälder was an eyewitness and depicted the happenings in the Kristallnacht, the extent of the devastation in the synagogue, the temporary arrest of her husband in the Dachau concentration camp, as well as the daily fear of being deported when it became known that the Jews in the region were deported to the Gurs internment camp in southern France since fall 1940. Wilhelm/William and Emilie Wälder (widow Rosinus, born Reinheimer) were able to emigrate in May 1941 to the US.

After 1945 the building was leased. The prayer room was renovated from 1979 to 1981. During the renovation, the remains of paintings were found, e.g. Die Palme des Gerechten (Psalm 92, verse 13).

The former synagogue's prayer room was used as a driving school until 2019.

=== New synagogue ===
A foundation stone ceremony for a new synagogue was held on March 20, 2016. According to the words of Rami Suleiman, Oberratsvorsitzender of the Israelitische Religionsgemeinschaft Baden, the foundation stone comes from the Temple Mount in Jerusalem and represents the place where Solomon's Temple stood until its destruction. The stone was framed into the wall in such a way that it can be touched by the members of the congregation, and symbolizes the congregation's connection with Israel.

== Gallery ==
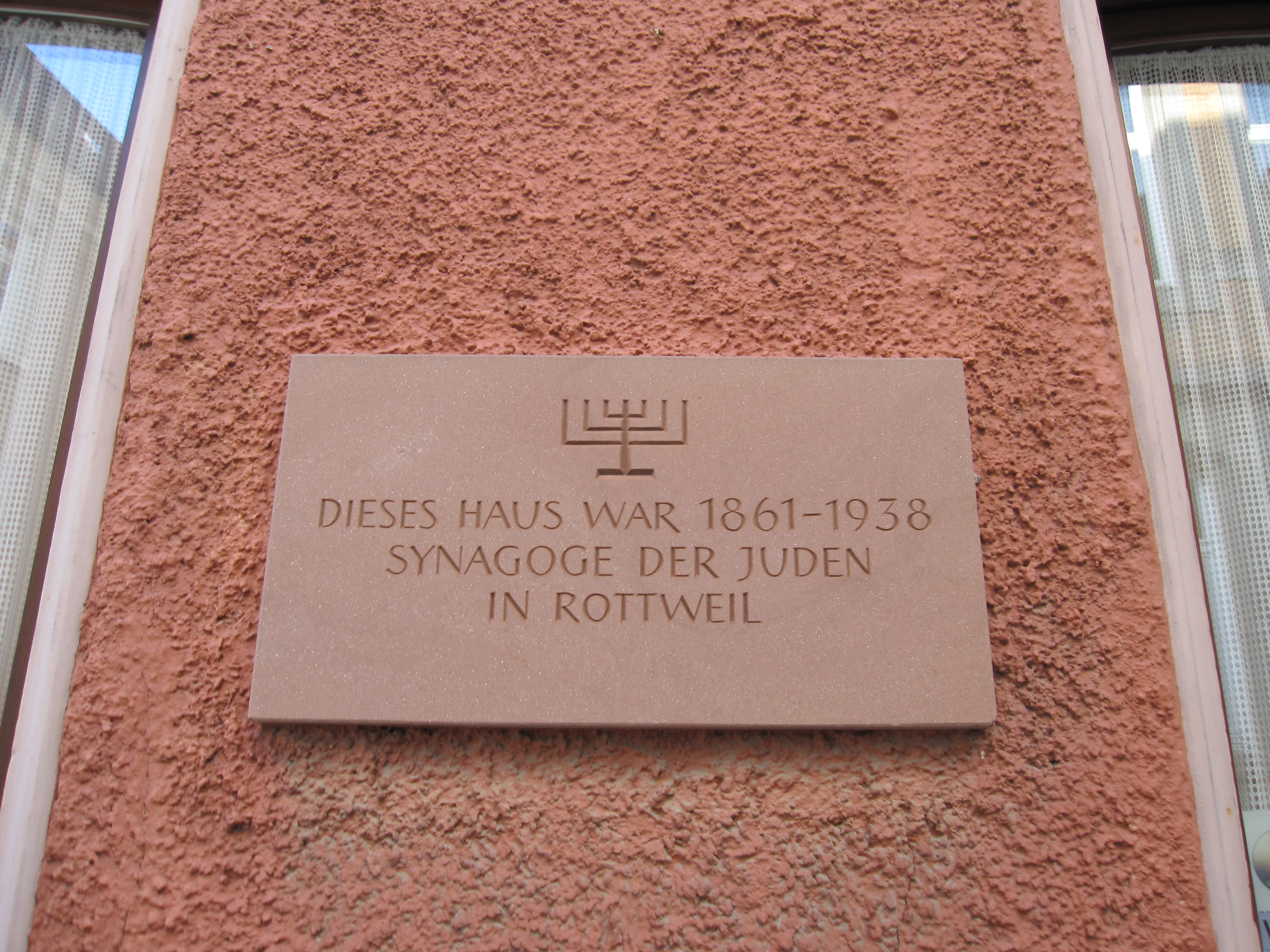
Memorial tablet

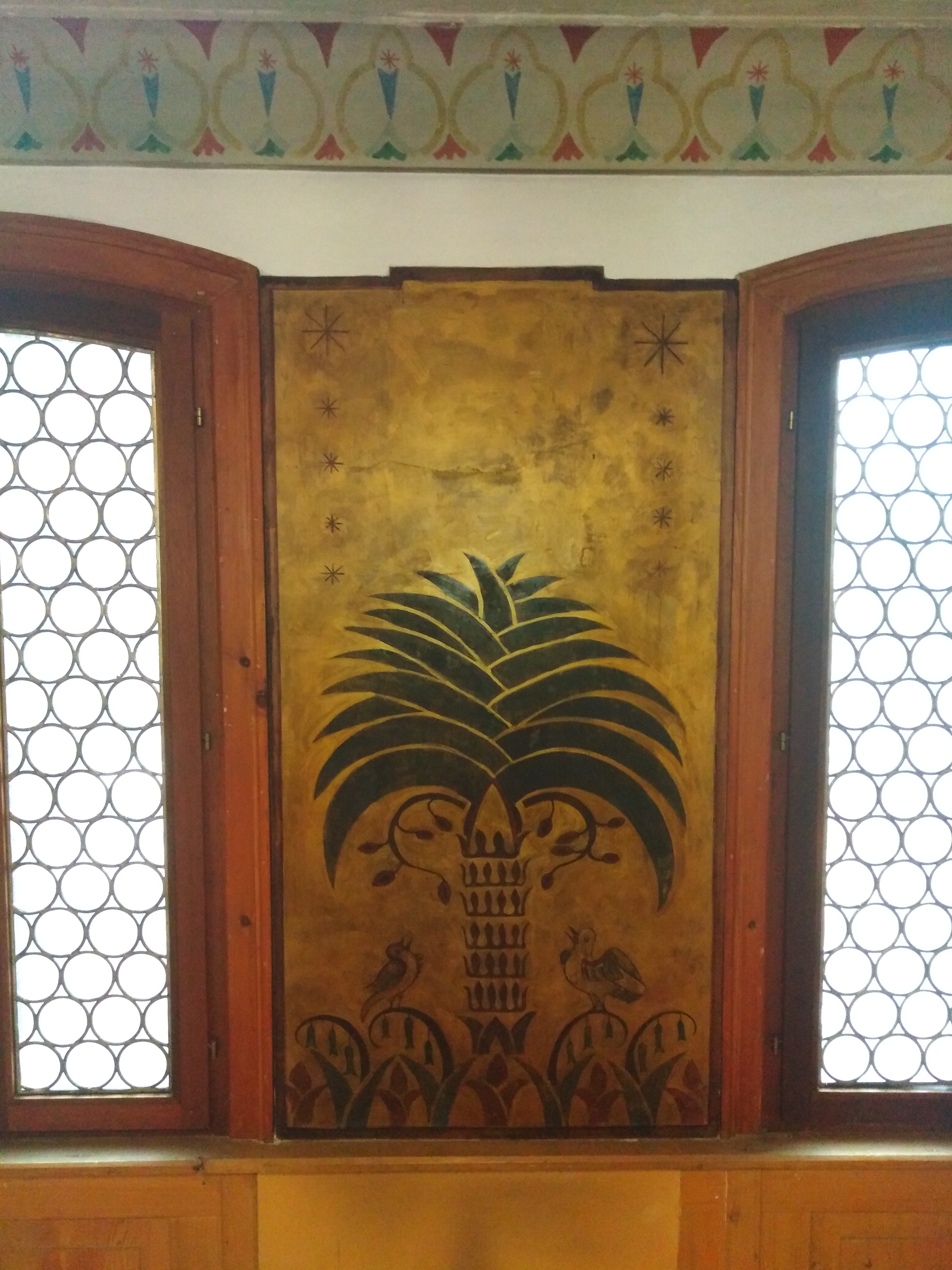
"Palme des Gerechten" (Palm of the Just), c. 1850

== See also ==
- History of the Jews in Germany
- List of synagogues in Germany (in German)
