= Waldenbuch =

- Town
- Coat of arms

- Location of Waldenbuch within Böblingen district
- Interactive map of Waldenbuch
- Location within Germany Location within Baden-Württemberg
- Coordinates: 48°38′14″N 9°7′54″E
- Country: Germany
- State: Baden-Württemberg
- Admin. region: Stuttgart
- District: Böblingen
- Subdivisions: 7

Government
  - Mayor (2024–32): Chris Nathan (CDU)

Area
  - Total: 22.7 km^{2} (8.8 sq mi)
- Elevation: 362 m (1,188 ft)

Population (2025-12-31)
  - Total: 8,740
  - Density: 385/km^{2} (997/sq mi)
- Time zone: UTC+01:00 (CET)
  - Summer (DST): UTC+02:00 (CEST)
- Postal codes: 71111
- Dialling codes: 07157
- Vehicle registration: BB
- Website: www.waldenbuch.de

Waldenbuch (German pronunciation: [ˈvaldn̩ˌbuːx]; Swabian: Waldebuech) is a town in the district of Böblingen, Baden-Württemberg, Germany.

It is the home of the popular Ritter Sport brand of chocolate.

== Geography ==
=== Geographical location ===
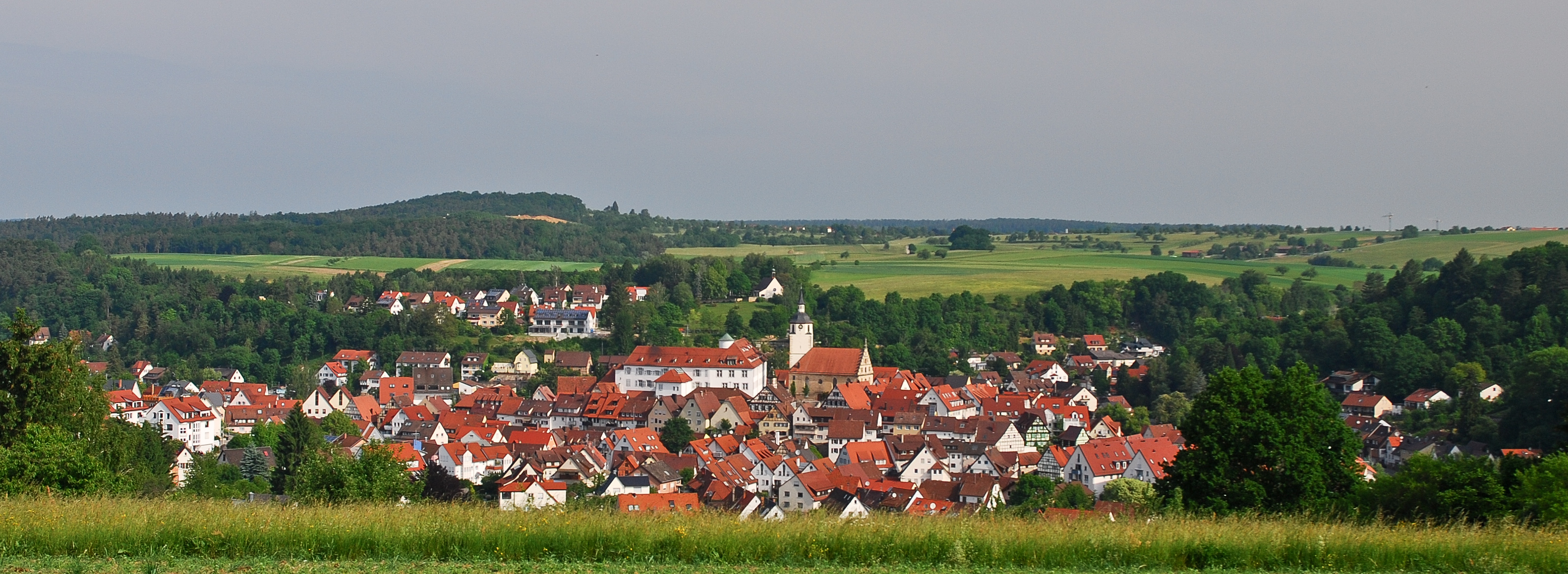
Panoramic view over Waldenbuch

Waldenbuch is situated at an altitude reaching from 340 to 460 meters on the northern edge of Schönbuch forest, 16 km south of Stuttgart.

=== Districts ===
Waldenbuch consists of the following districts Sonnenhang, Kalkofen, Weilerberg, Glashütte, Stadtkern ("Städtle"), Liebenau and Hasenhof.

== History ==
Waldenbuch was first mentioned in documents in 1296. The city rights were confirmed September 14, 1363. Since 1363 the city has belonged to Württemberg, but was under the repurchase option of Austria.

== Religions ==
Since the Reformation Waldenbuch has been Evangelical. It was only in 1950 that WW2 German expellees founded another Roman Catholic church, St. Martinus.

The Evangelical Church Community of Waldenbuch has named its community center Georg-Pfäfflin Community Center to commemorate the work of Georg Pfäfflin, German Lutheran pastor of the town from 1942 til 1945, and of his wife Ursula Pfäfflin.

The town of Waldenbuch has erected the column (Stele) number 10 on Marktstrasse because of the engagement of Georg Pfäfflin hiding a jewish woman during the last days of the Second World War.

== Population ==
Population figures are taken from census results or statistical data from the data office in Stuttgart.

| Year | Number of residents |
|---|---|
| 1. December 1871 ¹ | 1.895 |
| 1. December 1900 ¹ | 1.832 |
| 17. May 1939 ¹ | 2.204 |
| 13. September 1950 ¹ | 3.265 |
| 6. June 1961 ¹ | 4.475 |
| 27. May 1970 ¹ | 5.220 |
| 25. May 1987 ¹ | 7.389 |
| 31. December 1995 | 8.267 |
| 31. December 2000 | 8.727 |
| 31. December 2005 | 8.651 |
| 31. December 2010 | 8.527 |

== Economy and infrastructure ==
=== Transportation ===
Country road 1208 (old B 27) connects the city to the north with Stuttgart and to the south with Tübingen. The L 1185 leads west to Böblingen and east to Nürtingen. In 1928 the Siebenmühlental-Railway opened to Leinfelden and was later decommissioned in 1956. The local public transport system is operated today by bus line 86 (Vaihingen-Leinfelden-Waldenbuch) of the Stuttgarter Straßenbahnen. Bus lines 760 (Böblingen-Schönaich-Waldenbuch), 826 (Leinfelden-Waldenbuch-Tübingen) and 828 (Stuttgart Airport Waldenbuch-Tübingen) are operated by Regional Bus Stuttgart.

== Sights and culture ==
In the centre of Waldenbuch is the town's landmark Schloss Waldenbuch. The castle is the domicile of the Museum der Alltagskultur, one of the most important museums of folk culture in Germany.

=== Buildings ===
- The Stadtkirche St. Veit dates back in its origins to the 14th century.
- The old rectory is in the immediate vicinity of the town church. The current building dates from 1720; Since 1990 it serves as a municipal music school.

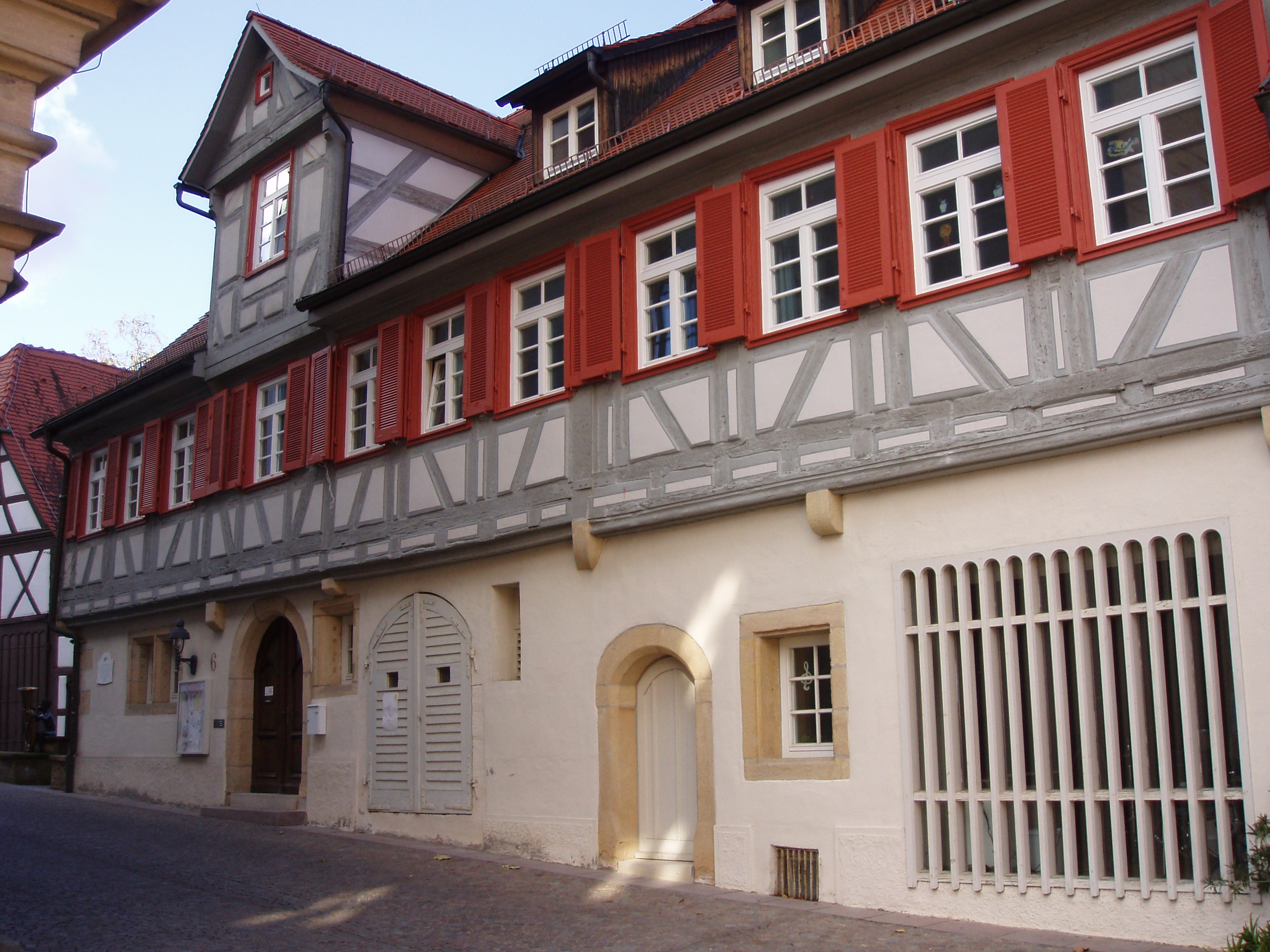
Waldenbuch Pfarrhaus Old rectory

- The Waldenbuch Castle was a hunting lodge of the Dukes of Württemberg. The core of the system goes back to a castle which was first mentioned in 1381.

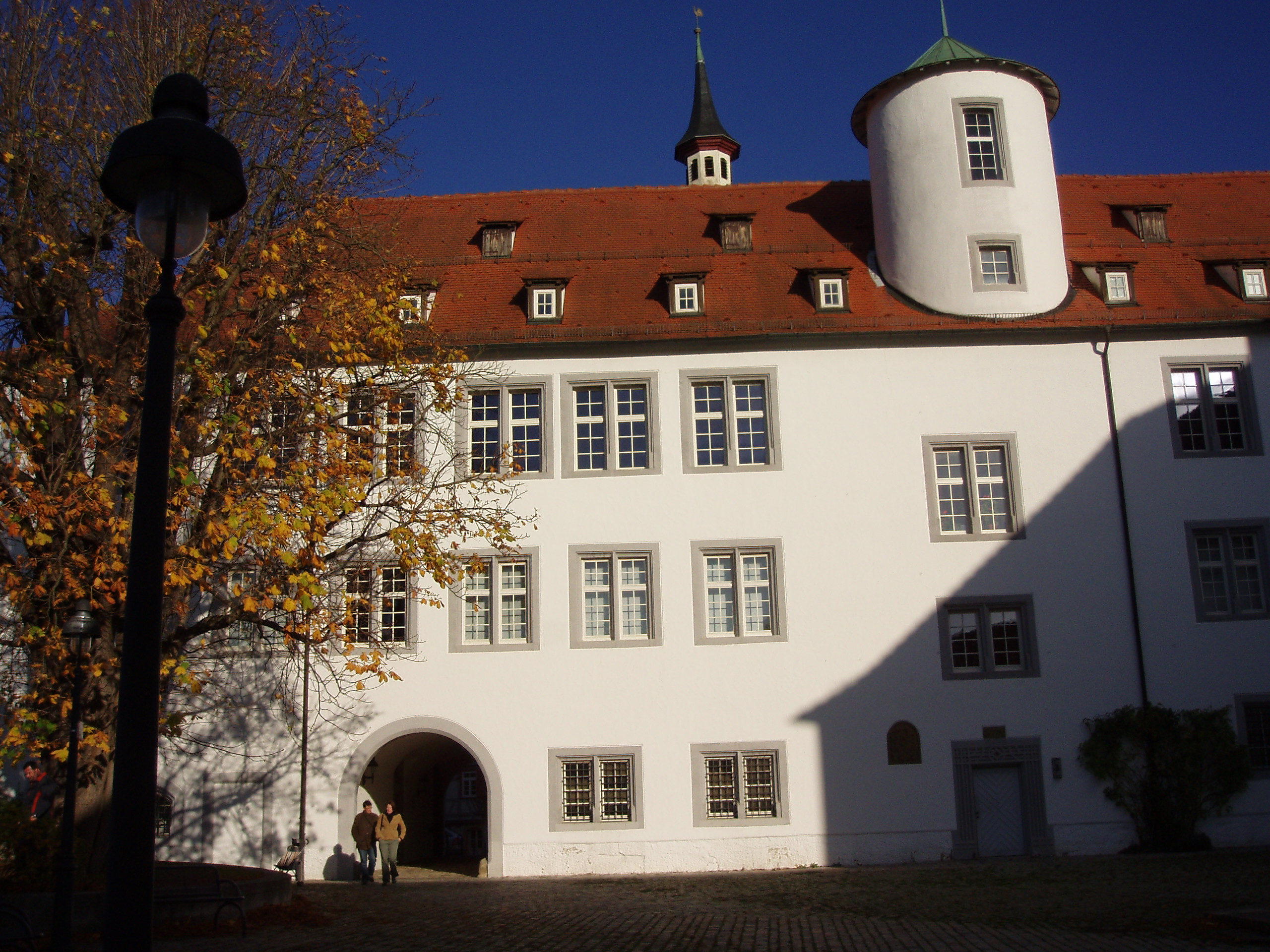
Waldenbuch Schloss

- Castle and Stadtkirche including associated buildings make up the market square where the town hall is also situated.
- Opposite the town hall is the headquarters counterclaim, also a half-timbered building. It was built around 1750 as a guesthouse for court hunting parties.
- The market fountain, which is approximately in the middle of the square, dates back to 1953.
- The Dannecker House, built around 1620. Here the sculptor Johann Heinrich Dannecker spent his childhood with his grandparents.
