= Crown Jewels of Württemberg =

Crown of Württemberg
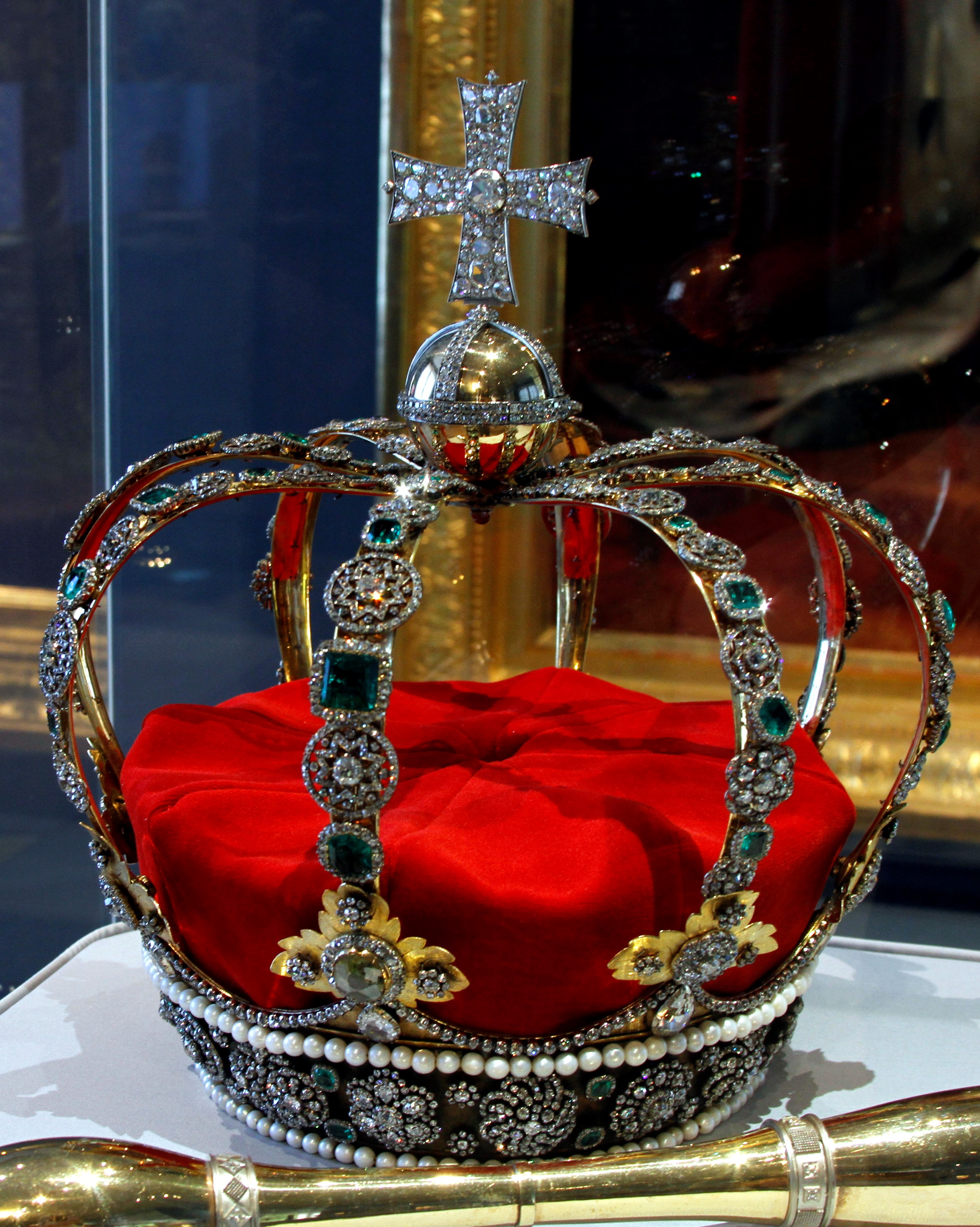
- The Württemberg Crown

Heraldic depictions

Details
- Country: Germany
- Made: 1806
- Arches: 8
- Material: Gold
- Cap: Orange
- Notable stones: Diamonds, emeralds, pearls

The Crown Jewels of Württemberg (German: Kronjuwelen des Königreichs Württemberg) are a historical jewel collection belonging to the Kings and Queens of Württemberg.

The original crown jewels were made in 1806 for Frederick I of Württemberg to celebrate Württemberg achieving kingdom status.

The Crown of Württemberg consists of gold, diamonds, pearls and emeralds. Many of the diamonds were donated by the jewel collector Duke Charles Alexander. The crown was never traditionally worn at celebrations. Rather, it was carried during ceremonies such as weddings, New Year's Day celebrations and funerals. The appearance of the crown was last modified during 1897 by the court jeweller August Heinrich Kuhn for King William II of Württemberg. In 1945 the crown was confiscated by French troops from a bank vault in Biberach an der Riß. The crown was later returned to the State of Württemberg-Hohenzollern.

The crown jewels also include the Diamond Diadem created for Queen Pauline of Württemberg in 1820. Queen Pauline's husband King William I even had several large diamonds transferred from the Crown of Württemberg to the Diamond Diadem. The collection also includes a golden dinner set given to the King in 1816 by Grand Duchess (and later Queen) Catherine Pavlovna of Russia.

After the monarchy ended in Württemberg in 1918 the House of Württemberg and the Free People's State of Württemberg split the crown jewels. Today some of the collection including the Crown and Diadem can be viewed at the Landesmuseum Württemberg.

== See also ==
- German Crown Jewels
- Order of the Württemberg Crown
