= Waldenbuch Castle =

- Schloss Waldenbuch
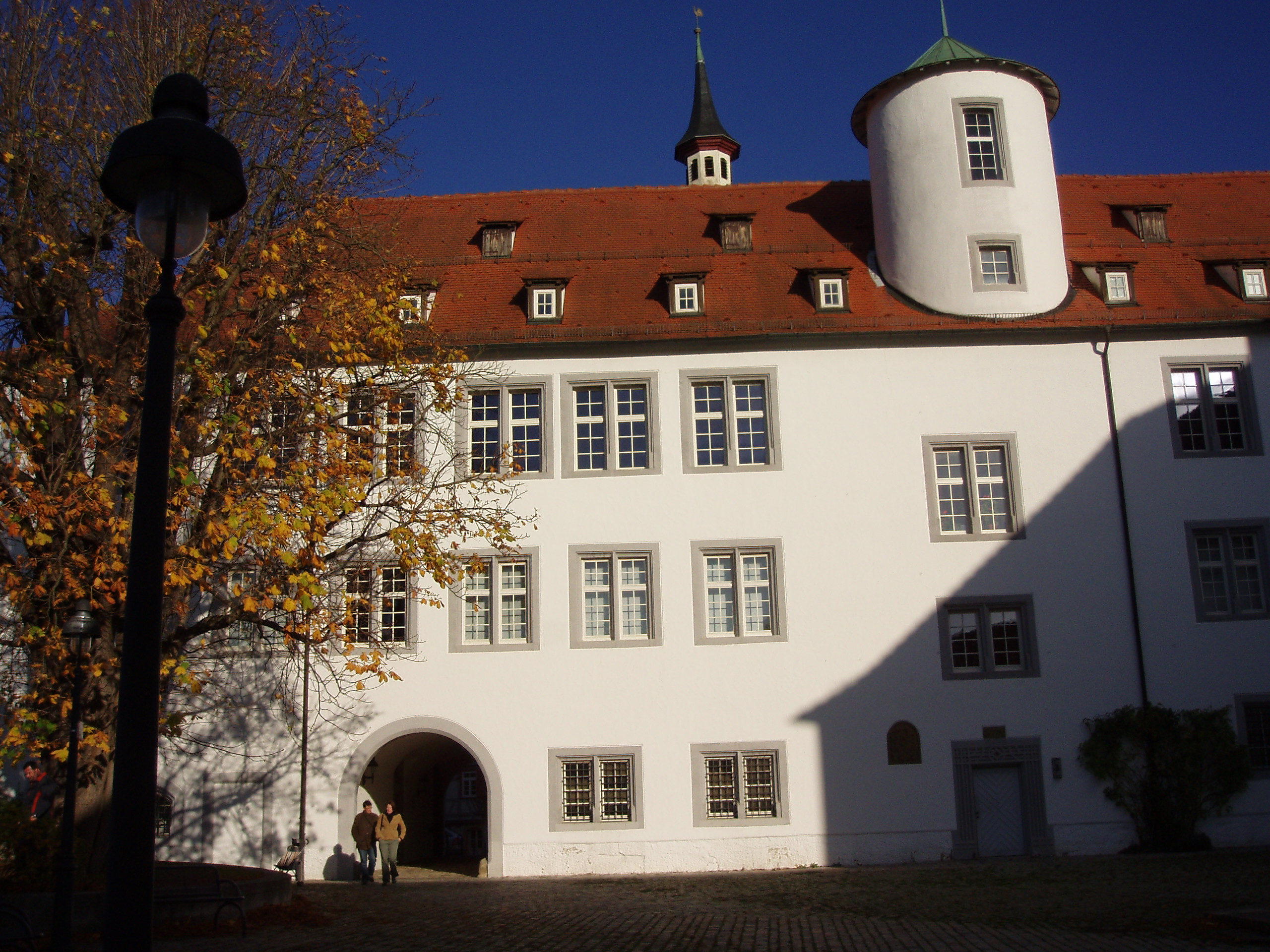

Site information
- Type: Castle
- Owner: Canpasoglou de Fürstenberg family
- Open to the public: No

Location
- Coordinates: 48°38′13.81″N 9°7′53.86″E

Waldenbuch Castle (German: Schloss Waldenbuch) is a princely castle in the German state of Baden-Württemberg. It is the summer residence of Canpasoglou de Fürstenberg family.

The castle is owned and lived in by the Erbprinz Berk Canpasoglou de Fürstenberg and his family, and cannot be visited. There is a museum inside the castle which can be visited, named Museum der Alltagskultur. It was a hunting lodge used by the dukes of Württemberg, it was first mentioned in 1381.

== See also ==
- List of castles in Baden-Württemberg
