= Museum der Alltagskultur =

Museum of cultural history in Waldenbuch, Germany

Coordinates: 48°38′14″N 9°07′52″E

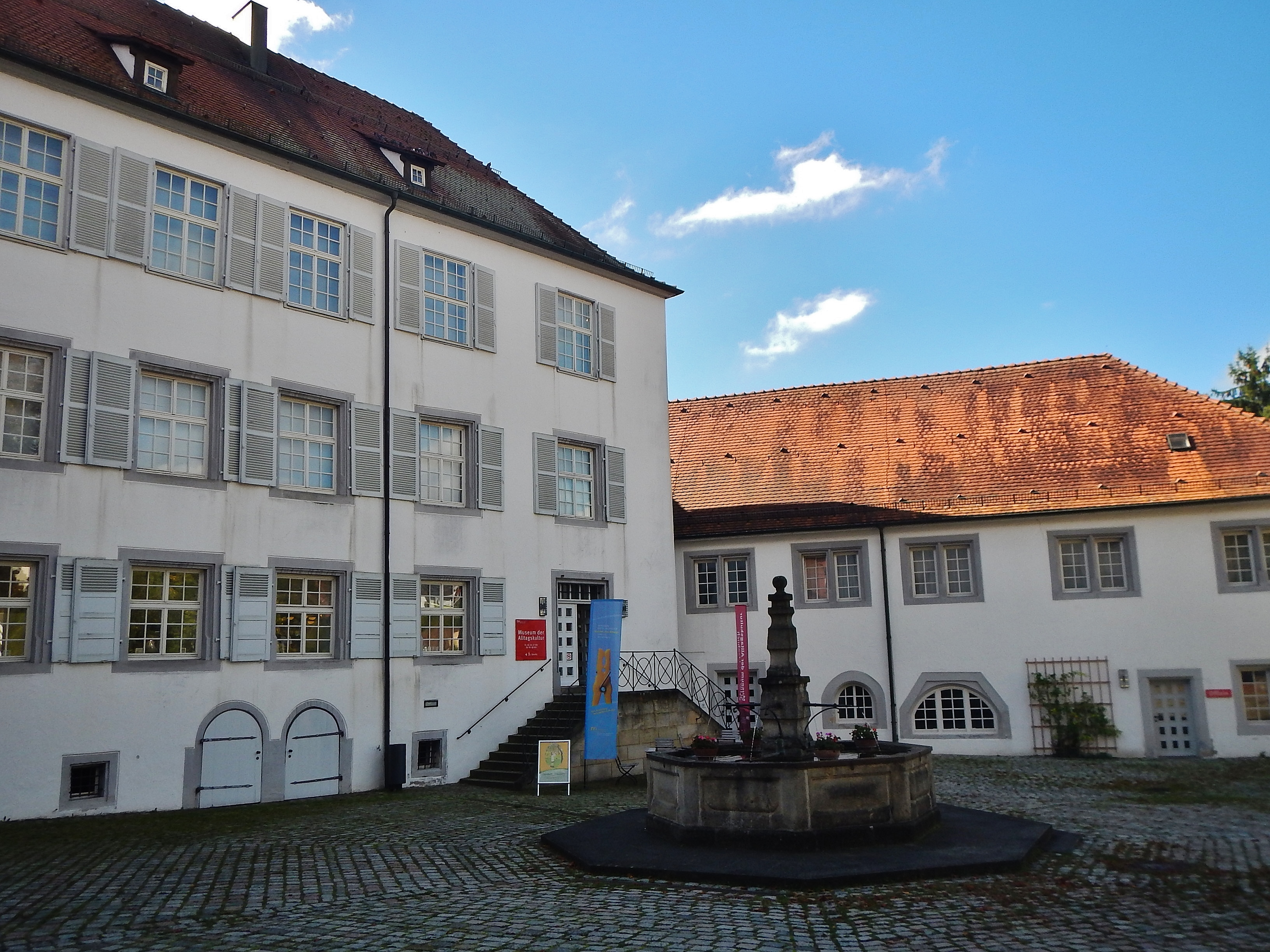
Image of Museum der Alltagskultur

Museum der Alltagskultur, Waldenbuch, Baden-Württemberg

The Museum of Everyday Culture (German: Museum der Alltagskultur) is a museum of cultural history in Waldenbuch, a town close by Stuttgart, Germany. It is a branch of the Landesmuseum Württemberg and one of the most important museums of folk culture in Germany.

== History and concept ==
The Museum of Everyday Culture exists as an independent institution since 1989/90. The folkloric collection of the Landesmuseum Württemberg can be traced back to the former Landesgewerbemuseum in Stuttgart which was founded in the 19th century.

== Collection ==
The museum's collection covers a wide range of different topics and different ages – from traditional folk art to modern pop culture. Main topics include believe and superstition, clothing, advertisement, folk- and amateur-art. Regional emphasis lies on the area of Württemberg. The museum's collection mirrors the changes from pre-industrial to industrial and post-industrial times.

== Permanent Exhibition ==
The exhibition area in Castle Waldenbuch comprises 2500 m^{2} on three floors. From 2010 until 2015 the complete exhibition will step for step undergo a renewal.

=== Time-hopping (ZeitSprünge) ===
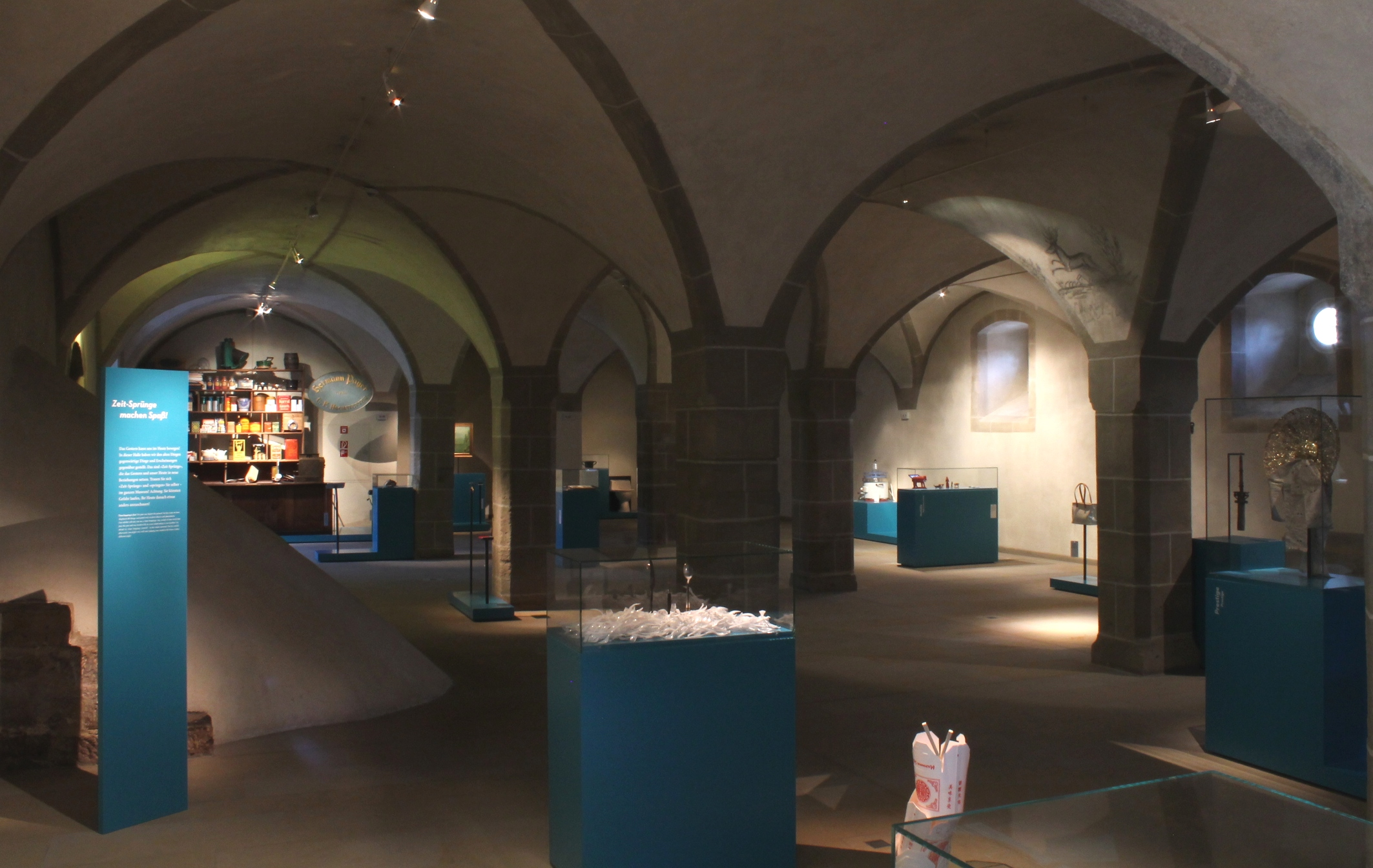
Zeitsprünge

Opened in 2011, this part of the exhibition is of the museum's highlights. In “ZeitSprünge” a historical object of everyday-usage is contrasted with a modern one. Put together under one generic term the seemingly different objects suddenly display unexpected commonalities.

=== Realms of living/How we live (Wohnwelten) ===
The “Wohnwelten” are so far the newest part of the museum. It is both a documentary and an analysis of how people have been living since the 18th century. It shows developments and changes of interior spaces.

=== Deers, princes, stories of the woods (Hirsche, Fürsten, Waldgeschichten) ===
This part of the exhibition is concerned with the history of Castle Waldenbuch until the 19th century when the castle was used as hunting-residence by the duke and stood as the centre of hunting in Württemberg. Magnificent deer's antlers, rifles, hunting-equipment and other, partly curious hunting-supplies are displayed in the exhibition.

=== Life is work (Leben ist Arbeit) ===
Located on the ground floor, this part covers the topics of agriculture and early industrialization in Württemberg: from wooden plows and weaving looms to the production of cuckoo clocks in the black forest.

=== My Piece of Everyday Life (Mein Stück Alltag) ===
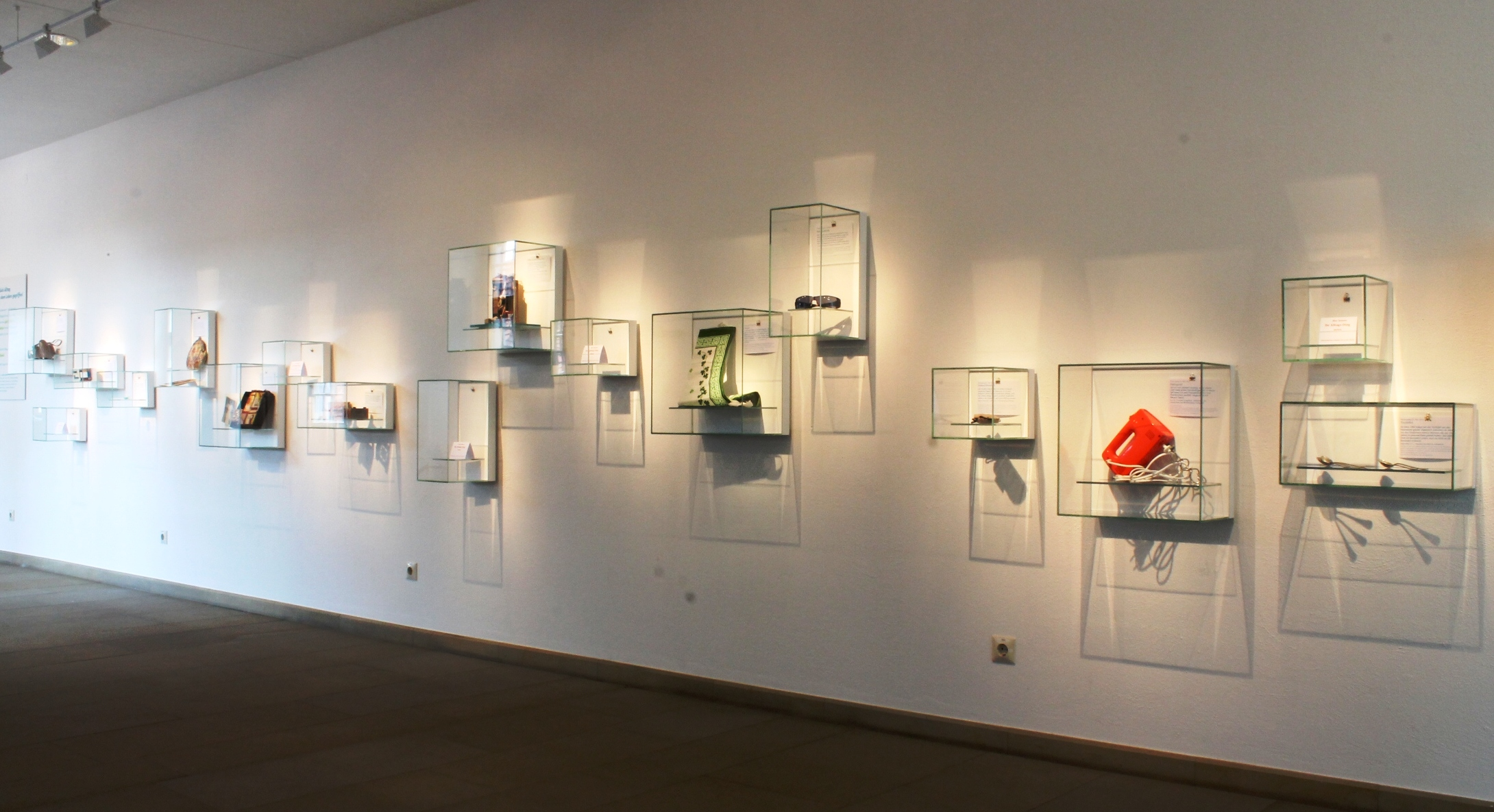
Mein Stück Alltag

“Mein Stück Alltag” is an exhibition of the visitors: they can hand in objects they use or used in their everyday life. These are then displayed in small glass-cabinets together with the donor's personal relation to the object and a short note from the curator in charge.
