= 2022–23 Rugby-Bundesliga =

- Countries: Germany
- Date: 3 September 2022 – 1 July 2023
- Champions: 1880 Frankfurt (5th title)
- Relegated: Heidelberger RK
- Matches played: 112

The 2022–23 Rugby-Bundesliga was the 52nd edition of this competition and the 103rd edition of the German rugby union championship.

SC 1880 Frankfurt were the defending champions.

== Teams ==
Locations of the 2022–23 Rugby-Bundesliga teams

A total of sixteen teams participated in the 2022–23 edition of the Rugby-Bundesliga.

=== Team changes ===
Promoted from 2021–22 2. Rugby-Bundesliga	Relegated from 2021–22 Rugby-Bundesliga
München RFC; OSC Rosenhöhe; FC St. Pauli; Victoria Linden	VfR Döhren; RC Luxemburg; SG Pforzheim

=== Stadiums and locations ===
Club	City	Coach	Stadium
North-East
Berlin 03	Berlin	Christian Lill	Stadion Buschallee
Berliner RC	Berlin	Uwe Maaser	Sportanlage Jungfernheide
Germania List	Hannover	Fabian Hagedorn	Sportplatz Schneckenburgerstrasse
Hamburger RC	Hamburg	Jackson Auswärts	Rugbyanlage Saarlandstraße
Hannover 78	Hanover	Raphael Pyrasch	Sportleistungszentrum
RC Leipzig	Leipzig	Andreas Kuntze	Sportplatzanlage Stahmeln
FC St. Pauli	Hamburg	Paul McGuigan	Rugbyanlage Saarlandstraße
Victoria Linden	Hannover	Jörg Schmer	Sportplatz Fösseweg
South-West
1880 Frankfurt	Frankfurt	Byron Schmidt	Sportanlage Feldgerichtstrasse
TSV Handschuhsheim	Heidelberg	Tony Miskella	Sportanlage Eichwaldweg
RG Heidelberg	Heidelberg	Mustafa Güngör	Fritz-Grunebaum-Sportpark
Heidelberger RK	Heidelberg	Alex Wiedemann	Sportzentrum Süd
RK Heusenstamm	Heusenstamm	Mikey Ferraris	Sportzentrum Martinsee
München RFC	Munich	Umberto Re	Bezirkssportanlage
SC Neuenheim	Heidelberg	Curtis Bradford	Museumsplatz Tiergartenstraße
OSC Rosenhöhe	Offenbach am Main	Frans Schalk Jooste	Sportanlage Eichwaldweg

== Regular season ==
=== North-East ===
==== Table ====
	Club	Played	W	D	L	PF	PA	Diff	BP	Points	Qualification/Relegation
1	Hannover 78	14	13	0	1	527	190	337	0	61	Qualification for Play-off stage
2	Berliner RC	14	12	0	2	526	119	407	0	59	Qualification for Play-off stage
3	RC Leipzig	14	9	0	5	403	312	91	0	41	Qualification for Play-off stage
4	Germania List	14	7	0	7	357	356	1	0	36	Qualification for Play-off stage
5	Hamburger RC	14	5	0	9	265	366	-101	0	29	
6	Berlin 03	14	4	0	10	203	504	-301	0	22	
7	Victoria Linden	14	3	0	11	280	456	-176	0	19	
8	FC St. Pauli (O)	14	3	0	11	222	480	-258	0	18	Qualification for relegation play-offs

Rules for classification: 1) Points; 2) Number of wins; 3) Point difference.
(C) Champion; (O) Play-off winner(s); (R) Relegated

==== Results ====
Home \ Away	BER	BRC	GER	HRC	HAN	LEI	STP	VIC
Berlin 03	—	0–50	5–45	18–17	7–41	28–31	25–12	24–10
Berliner RC	31–0	—	40–0	64–0	18–19	19–7	66–0	37–15
Germania List	29–19	15–17	—	28–3	10–69	30–38	64–14	15–30
Hamburger RC	40–13	13–36	15–16	—	11–10	24–47	24–28	33–15
Hannover 78	71–24	31–23	13–12	28–3	—	23–6	52–5	59–14
RC Leipzig	59–10	9–32	66–5	29–3	21–29	—	31–15	0–50
FC St. Pauli	19–24	5–32	17–36	24–39	31–37	17–10	—	8–19
Victoria Linden	49–6	5–61	10–52	10–40	5–45	27–49	21–27	—

Source: Rugby-Bundesliga
Legend: Blue = home team win; Yellow = draw; Red = away team win.

=== South-West ===
==== Table ====
	Club	Played	W	D	L	PF	PA	Diff	BP	Points	Qualification/Relegation
1	1880 Frankfurt (C)	14	13	1	0	655	175	480	0	63	Qualification for Play-off stage
2	SC Neuenheim	14	12	1	1	630	160	470	0	59	Qualification for Play-off stage
3	TSV Handschuhsheim	14	10	0	4	697	191	506	0	49	Qualification for Play-off stage
4	OSC Rosenhöhe	14	5	1	8	258	398	-140	0	26	Qualification for Play-off stage
5	RG Heidelberg	14	5	1	8	318	534	-216	0	26	
6	München RFC	14	4	1	9	325	641	-316	0	24	
7	RK Heusenstamm (O)	14	4	1	9	232	555	-323	0	21	Qualification for relegation play-offs
8	Heidelberger RK (R)	14	0	0	14	215	676	-461	0	2	Relegation to 2. Rugby-Bundesliga

Rules for classification: 1) Points; 2) Number of wins; 3) Point difference.
(C) Champion; (O) Play-off winner(s); (R) Relegated

==== Results ====
Home \ Away	FRA	HAN	HEI	HRK	HEU	MÜN	NEU	OSC
1880 Frankfurt	—	43–28	73–7	43–15	52–3	92–0	25–15	29–16
TSV Handschuhsheim	0–12	—	58–10	46–10	139–3	56–15	7–24	56–3
RG Heidelberg	13–56	7–82	—	38–17	24–5	39–34	13–29	25–30
Heidelberger RK	7–94	0–71	26–61	—	23–36	15–41	7–64	18–22
RK Heusenstamm	13–22	10–24	20–20	38–14	—	53–14	3–52	11–10
München RFC	25–60	13–82	48–32	30–28	39–17	—	26–32	24–24
SC Neuenheim	19–19	27–14	46–15	57–17	95–0	72–0	—	46–14
OSC Rosenhöhe	14–35	14–34	10–14	35–18	27–20	39–16	0–52	—

Source: Rugby-Bundesliga
Legend: Blue = home team win; Yellow = draw; Red = away team win.

== Play-off stage ==
=== Championship ===
Quarter final
DSV 78 Hannover	18
OSC Rosenhöhe	15
SC Neuenheim	72
RC Leipzig	11
SC 1880 Frankfurt
Germania List
Berliner Rugby Club	24
TSV Handschuhsheim	29

Semi final
DSV 78 Hannover	16
SC Neuenheim	19
SC 1880 Frankfurt	48
TSV Handschuhsheim	8

Final
SC Neuenheim	16
SC 1880 Frankfurt	30

== Promotion-Relegation round ==
=== Promotion round ===
==== Semi final ====
3 June 2023

ASV Köln Rugby	52–5	RC Unterföhring

3 June 2023

RC Rottweil	17-30	RC Luxembourg

==== Final ====
17 June 2023

ASV Köln Rugby	16-15	RC Luxembourg

=== Relegation round ===
1 July 2023

RC Luxembourg	0-15	RK Heusenstamm

1 July 2023

RU Hohen Neuendorf	12-45	FC St. Pauli Rugby
