= 2015–16 Rugby-Bundesliga =

- Countries: Germany
- Champions: TV Pforzheim (1st title)
- Runners-up: Heidelberger RK
- Relegated: RU Hohen Neuendorf ASV Köln Rugby

The 2015–16 Rugby-Bundesliga is the 45th edition of this competition and the 96th edition of the German rugby union championship. In the Rugby-Bundesliga, sixteen teams play in two regional divisions, followed by play-offs consisting of the top two teams in each division. The regular season started on 29 August 2015 and finished on 24 April 2016, followed by the semi-finals and the championship final, the latter held on 7 May 2016, with the DRV-Pokal and the promotion-relegation play-off continuing until June 2016. The season was interrupted by a winter break from early November to early March.

The defending champions were Heidelberger RK who defeated TV Pforzheim 53–27 in the 2015 final to take out its twelfth championship and sixth in a row. The club thereby also equaled a championship record, becoming the second club after TSV Victoria Linden to win six consecutive titles. The 2016 championship was won by TV Pforzheim, defeating Heidelberger RK 41–36 in the final. For Pforzheim it was the first national rugby union championship, an achievement seen as a surprise given the dominance of Heidelberg, having defeated Pforzheim in three previous finals.

The modus and size of the league had been altered from the 2014–15 season, with the number of clubs reduced from, nominally, 24 to 16.

== Overview ==
Location of teams in the Rugby-Bundesliga 2015-16

The Rugby-Bundesliga, which had been playing with 21 clubs in 2014–15, three less than the nominal strength of 24, was reduced to 16 clubs for 2015–16. The previous season, the league played a first round of four regional groups, followed by a second round with two regional groups of eight, and play-offs consisting of twelve teams, Instead, the 2015–16 season saw a reduction to just two regional groups of eight teams each.

In the 2015–16 Bundesliga each team plays the other seven in their division twice, home and away, during the regular season. No games will be played between clubs from opposite divisions during this phase. The regular season will be followed by play-offs in which the winner of the south-west division plays the runners-up of the north-east and the winner of the north-east the runners-up of the south-west division. The two semi-final winners then contest the German championship final, scheduled for 21 May 2016.

The remaining twelve teams enter the DRV-Pokal, whereby the clubs placed third and fourth receive a bye for the first round. The last placed team in each division will be automatically relegated to the 2. Rugby-Bundesliga. The second-last team in each division has to play the 2. Bundesliga semi-final losers for a place in the 2016–17 Rugby-Bundesliga.

Compare to the 2014–15 season no team was promoted to the Bundesliga but five teams relegated from the league, TSV Victoria Linden, SG Siemensstadt/Grizzlies, Berliner SV 92 Rugby, RC Aachen and Heidelberger TV.

== Bundesliga tables ==
=== North-East ===
The final division table :

	Club	Played	W	D	L	PF	PA	Diff	BP	Points
1	RK 03 Berlin	14	14	0	0	575	116	459	13	69
2	SC Germania List	14	10	1	3	568	206	362	12	54
3	DSV 78 Hannover	14	9	2	3	449	190	259	9	49
4	Berliner Rugby Club	14	7	2	5	340	286	54	6	38
5	FC St. Pauli Rugby	14	6	0	8	255	438	-183	5	29
6	RC Leipzig	14	4	0	10	215	437	-222	4	21
7	Hamburger RC	14	2	1	11	168	320	-152	3	11
8	RU Hohen Neuendorf (R)	14	1	0	13	145	722	-577	1	5

- Hamburger RC deducted two points for breach of licensing regulations.

Club	DSV	RKB	GER	BRC	HRC	STP	RUH	RCL
DSV Hannover	—	13–29	3–22	8–8	38–10	53–6	46–12	39–5
RK 03 Berlin	30–10	—	45–19	46–5	29–12	53–0	71–8	57–3
Germania List	25–25	21–24	—	59–0	45–17	33–0	113–3	45–3
Berliner RC	21–31	0–28	30–29	—	44–14	48–12	55–0	32–5
Hamburger RC	3–23	3–19	10–18	6–6	—	12–29	30–10	13–10
FC St. Pauli	0–57	10–44	7–56	29–5	17–11	—	31–12	54–5
RU Hohen Neuendorf	0–71	6–69	17–38	14–58	17–16	17–40	—	29–31
RC Leipzig	19–33	6–31	22–45	5–28	15–11	33–20	53–0	—

=== South-West ===
The final division table:

	Club	Played	W	D	L	PF	PA	Diff	BP	Points
1	Heidelberger RK	14	14	0	0	1001	135	866	14	70
2	TV Pforzheim (C)	14	12	0	2	629	256	373	11	57
3	RG Heidelberg	14	8	1	5	423	365	58	7	41
4	SC Neuenheim	14	7	1	6	340	405	-65	6	36
5	TSV Handschuhsheim	14	6	0	8	364	481	-117	9	33
6	SC 1880 Frankfurt	14	5	2	7	238	396	-158	3	27
7	RK Heusenstamm	14	2	0	11	149	467	-318	4	12
8	ASV Köln Rugby (R)	14	0	0	14	150	789	-639	3	3

- TV Pforzheim deducted two points for breach of licensing regulations.

Club	HRK	TVP	SCN	RGH	TSV	RKH	SCF	ASV
Heidelberger RK	—	31–15	71–0	78–19	61–17	43–5	57–5	95–15
TV Pforzheim	17–41	—	35–9	64–26	83–24	27–26	50–8	90–12
SC Neuenheim	7–125	10–28	—	11–21	23–17	21–8	32–8	64–10
RG Heidelberg	18–44	24–38	23–20	—	30–12	9–6	10–10	74–7
TSV Handschuhsheim	14–71	15–63	26–29	42–40	—	33–6	29–10	59–3
RK Heusenstamm	0–96	3–52	10–47	11–25	5–44	—	12–16	24–17
SC 1880 Frankfurt	0–73	8–42	16–16	17–35	38–3	35–9	—	48–8
ASV Köln Rugby	3–115	19–25	7–51	5–69	15–29	5–24	20–22	—

=== Key ===
Table:	Championship play-offs	Relegation play-offs	Relegated
Results:	Home win	Draw	Away win

== Play-off stage ==
=== Championship ===
The top two teams in each division qualified for the play-offs with the semi-finals held on 30 April and the final on 7 May 2016:

Round 1
30 April 2016, Berlin
RK 03 Berlin	15
TV Pforzheim	30
30 April 2016, Heidelberg
Heidelberger RK	104
SC Germania List	12

Round 2
7 May 2016, Heusenstamm
TV Pforzheim	41
Heidelberger RK	36

=== DRV-Pokal ===
The remaining twelve Bundesliga clubs not qualified for the championship play-off entered the DRV-Pokal, the premier rugby union cup competition in Germany. The teams placed third and fourth received a bye for the first round:

The first round will see the teams placed fifth to eighth drawn against each other:

14 May 2016

FC St. Pauli Rugby	7–44	RK Heusenstamm

15 May 2016

Hamburger RC	3–45	SC 1880 Frankfurt

14 May 2016

RC Leipzig	50–0	RU Hohen Neuendorf

14 May 2016

ASV Köln Rugby	0–67	TSV Handschuhsheim

For the quarter-finals teams were not seeded, with the clubs placed third and fourth entering the competition. The quarter finals are scheduled for 4 and 5 June, the semi-finals for 11 and 12 June and the final for 25 or 26 June:

Quarter final
RK Heusenstamm	25
SC Neuenheim	38
RG Heidelberg	34
DSV 78 Hannover	7
SC 1880 Frankfurt	59
RC Leipzig	7
TSV Handschuhsheim	50
Berliner Rugby Club	3

Semi final
SC Neuenheim	29
RG Heidelberg	13
SC 1880 Frankfurt	10
TSV Handschuhsheim	21

Final
SC Neuenheim	16
TSV Handschuhsheim	14

== Promotion round ==
The winners and runners-up of the four 2. Bundesliga divisions entered the promotion play-off to determine the two teams promoted directly and the two entering the play-off with Bundesliga seventh placed clubs. The promotion play-off will be conducted in two regional groups with the northern and eastern division clubs in one and the southern and western division ones in the other:

=== North-East ===
Semifinals
N1	TSV Victoria Linden	86
E2	USV Potsdam Rugby	14
E1	Veltener RC	22
N2	FT Adler Kiel Rugby	32

Finals
N1	TSV Victoria Linden	59
N2	FT Adler Kiel Rugby	15

=== South-West ===
Semifinals
S1	München RFC	39
W2	RC Aachen	29
W1	RC Luxembourg	33
S2	StuSta München	29

Finals
S1	München RFC	9
W1	RC Luxembourg	12

=== Promotion-Relegation round ===
The runners-up of the two regional promotion play-off were scheduled to compete with the seventh-placed Bundesliga teams for two more spots in the Bundesliga:

21 May 2016

FT Adler Kiel Rugby	10–43	Hamburger RC

18 June 2016

München RFC	cancelled	RK Heusenstamm

- Because the game between RFC München and RC Luxembourg had to be rescheduled because of an international played by the Luxembourg national team the final decider between München and Heusenstamm was delayed. Rescheduled a number of times it was eventually cancelled by München, Heusenstamm thereby retaining their Bundesliga place.
