= SV 08 Ricklingen =

German rugby union club, based in Hannover

(Germany) SV 08 Ricklingen
- Full name: Sportverein 1908 Ricklingen e.V.
- Union: German Rugby Federation
- Founded: 1908; 118 years ago
- Location: Hanover, Germany
- Ground: Am Mühlenholzweg
- Chairman: (Germany) Matthias Freitag
- League: inactive
- 2014–15: Rugby-Regionalliga (III), 5th

Official website
- 08ricklingen.de/index1.html

The SV 08 Ricklingen is a German rugby union club from the Ricklingen suburb of Hanover. The team plays in the 2nd Rugby-Bundesliga, the second tier of German rugby. After having formed an on-the-field union with DSV 78 Hannover from 2003 to 2009 instead of fielding an independent team, the club left this partnership at the end of the 2008–09 season. Instead, it formed a partnership with TuS Wunstorf from the 2009–10 season onwards. The team now plays as SG TuS Wunstorf/08 Ricklingen.

The club has three German rugby union championships to its name, won in 1950, 1960 and 1974.

== History ==
Ricklingen was formed on 6 August 1908, by twelve young men, as a rugby club. The club, for the most part, existed in the shadow of its local competitors, DSV 78 Hannover, TSV Victoria Linden and its bitter rival DRC Hannover, also from the suburb of Ricklingen.

08, as the club is nicknamed, managed to win three German championships and two cup wins during its history. The clubs first title came in 1950, when the final against SC Neuenheim was won. Ten years later, a second championship was won against TSV Handschuhsheim in 1960.

The team then took part in the newly established European Cup, where it met teams like SCA Brussels, AC Hilversum and ASPTT Rabat, travelling to Morocco to play the later.

Ricklingen was part of the new Rugby-Bundesliga when it was formed in 1971. The club suffered a harsh loss in its first Bundesliga season when the club house burned down.

Despite the loss of its long-time chairman Heinz Reinhotd in 1974, the club managed to win its third German championship that season. Two players were still left in the team that had won the 1960 title as well.

Despite only finishing fourth in the Bundesliga North, the club managed to reach the German final once more in 1992 after defeating RG Heidelberg and DSV 78 in the knock-out stage. Against TSV Victoria Linden, 08 was heavily outclassed in the final and lost 3-59.

In 1996, Ricklingen found itself in legal trouble with the German rugby association, the DRV. The reason was that the club had not played a Bundesliga game against VfR Döhren because the referee had not turned up. A long-drawn legal battle ended with the club being forcefully relegated from the Bundesliga in 1997.

After this forced relegation, the club lost a great number of players and was unable to return to former heights. After a number of seasons in the 2nd Bundesliga North/East it was decided to form an on-the-field union with DSV 78. After some initial skepticism, this was well accepted within the club. After winning the 2nd Bundesliga North/East in 2009, the club decided to leave the partnership.

Instead, it teamed up with TuS Wunstorf from the 2009–10 season, initially playing in the tier three Rugby-Regionalliga under the name of SG TuS Wunstorf/08 Ricklingen. A league expansion in 2012 saw the team earn promotion to the 2nd Rugby-Bundesliga. In the 2012–13 season, in the 2nd Bundesliga, the club finished in the upper half of the table and qualifyid for the play-offs for the DRV-Pokal. The club advanced to the quarter finals of the play-offs where it lost to RC Aachen but nevertheless earned promotion to the Rugby-Bundesliga for the following season.

The team qualified for the championship round of the Bundesliga in 2013–14 but had to withdraw from competition because of a lack of players. After a fifth place in the Regionalliga in 2014–15 the club did not field a team in the following year.

== Club honours ==
- German rugby union championship
  - Champions: 1950, 1960, 1974
  - Runners up: 1973, 1992
- German rugby union cup
  - Winner: 1970, 1978
  - Runners up: 1984, 1989

== Recent seasons ==
Recent seasons of the club:

Year	Division	Position
1997-98	2nd Rugby-Bundesliga North/East (II)	6th
1998-99	2nd Rugby-Bundesliga North/East	3rd
1998-99	Rugby-Bundesliga North/East qualification round	6th
1999–2000	2nd Rugby-Bundesliga North/East	5th
1999–2000	2nd Rugby-Bundesliga North/East qualification round	2nd
2000-01	2nd Rugby-Bundesliga North/East	4th
2000-01	2nd Rugby-Bundesliga North/East qualification round	2nd
2001-02	2nd Rugby-Bundesliga North/East	4th
2002-03	2nd Rugby-Bundesliga North/East	6th
2003-09	see DSV 78/08 Ricklingen	
2009-10	Rugby-Regionalliga Lower Saxony (III)	4th
2010-11	Rugby-Regionalliga North (III)	2nd
2011–12	Rugby-Regionalliga North	1st
2012–13	2nd Rugby-Bundesliga qualification round – North	2nd
2012–13	DRV-Pokal – North-East	4th
2013–14	Rugby-Bundesliga qualification round – North	5th
2013–14	Rugby-Bundesliga championship round – North-East	8th — Withdrawn
2014-15	Rugby-Regionalliga Nord (III)	5th

- Until 2001, when the single-division Bundesliga was established, the season was divided in autumn and spring, a Vorrunde and Endrunde, whereby the top teams of the Rugby-Bundesliga would play out the championship while the bottom teams together with the autumn 2nd Bundesliga champion would play for Bundesliga qualification. The remainder of the 2nd Bundesliga teams would play a spring round to determine the relegated clubs. Where two placings are shown, the first is autumn, the second spring. In 2012 the Bundesliga was expanded from ten to 24 teams and the 2nd Bundesliga from 20 to 24 with the leagues divided into four regional divisions.
