= Regionalliga Nord (disambiguation) =

Regionalliga Nord (English: Regional League North) may refer to a number of sports leagues in Northern Germany.

== Football ==
- Regionalliga Nord, a tier-four league in German football.
- Regionalliga Nord (1963–1974), a now defunct tier-two league in German football, existing from 1963 to 1974.

== Rugby union ==
- Rugby-Regionalliga Nord, a tier-three rugby union league in Germany.
