= TV Pforzheim =

German rugby union club, based in Pforzheim

(Germany) TV Pforzheim
- Full name: Turnverein 1834 Pforzheim e.V.
- Union: German Rugby Federation
- Founded: 1834; 192 years ago
- Location: Pforzheim, Germany
- Ground: Mäurach Sportplatz
- Chairman: Norbert Poff
- Coach: John Willis
- Captain: Mustafa Güngör
- League: Rugby-Bundesliga
- 2015–16: Rugby-Bundesliga South/West, 2nd
Team kit

The TV Pforzheim is a German rugby union club from Pforzheim, currently playing in the Rugby-Bundesliga, having won promotion to the league in 2011.

Apart from rugby, TVP offers other sports like gymnastics, volleyball and track and field.

== History ==
The club, formed as gymnastics club on 19 April 1834, does not have quite such a long history in the sport of rugby union.

The side did not field an independent team throughout most of the early 2000s, instead fielding a joined side with Karlsruher SV Rugby. In 2008, TVP finally entered its own side again in the Rugby-Regionalliga Baden-Württemberg, coming fourth.

The following year, the club came second, having played two games less than Heidelberger TV on top spot. After promotion, the side won all 18 season games in the 2nd Rugby-Bundesliga South/West, followed by an 89-0 victory over North/East champions TSV Victoria Linden, earning another promotion. The side has been unbeaten in league games since 18 October 2009, when it lost 19-27 at Heidelberger TV.

For the 2011-12 season, TVP has earned the right to compete in the highest division of German rugby, the Rugby-Bundesliga. The club was able to recruit former German and RG Heidelberg captain Mustafa Güngör after the opening round of the season as a player.

The club enjoyed a successful first season in the league, initially finishing second at the end of the regular season but finding themselves deducted two points for the lack of a junior squad. TVP was thereby relegated to third place and lost its home advantage in the semi-finals to SC 1880 Frankfurt but responded with a 46-25 away win and reached the final of the German championship for the first time, where it lost 16-20 to Heidelberger RK.

Pforzheim's declared aim for the 2012-13 season was to win the German championship. TV finished first in their group in the 2012-13 season and qualified for the south/west division of the championship round, where it also came first. The club advanced to the semi-finals where it was knocked out by Heidelberger RK, losing 9-51.

The club finished second in the south-west championship round in 2013–14, received a bye for the first round of the play-offs, defeating TSV Handschuhsheim in the quarter-finals and DSV 78 Hannover in the semi-finals. The team faced Heidelberger RK in the German championship final where it lost at home 20–43. TV also reached the final of the 2013–14 North Sea Cup where it defeated Boitsfort RC from Belgium and won the competition for the first time.

In the 2014–15 season the club finished second in the south-west championship group once more. It lost to Heidelberger RK in the final of the German championship final once more after play-off wins over RK Heusenstamm and SC Neuenheim. In 2015–16 it came second in the south/west division of the Bundesliga and defeated RK 03 Berlin in the play-off semi-finals. The 2016 final saw Pforzheim defeat Heidelberger RK 41–36 in the final to take out the national championship for the first time.

== Club honours ==
- German rugby union championship
  - Champions: 2016
  - Runners up: 2012, 2014, 2015
- 2. Rugby-Bundesliga
  - Champions: 2011
- German sevens championship
  - Champions: 2012
  - Runners up: 2013, 2014
- North Sea Cup
  - Champions: 2014

== Recent seasons ==
Recent seasons of the club:

Year	Division	Position
2008–09	Rugby-Regionalliga Baden-Württemberg	4th
2008–09	Rugby-Regionalliga Baden-Württemberg	2nd — Promoted
2010–11	2nd Rugby-Bundesliga South/West	1st — Promoted
2011–12	Rugby-Bundesliga	3rd — Runners up
2012–13	Rugby-Bundesliga qualification round – South	4th
2012–13	Rugby-Bundesliga championship round – South-West	3rd — Semi-finals
2013–14	Rugby-Bundesliga qualification round – South	2nd
2013–14	Rugby-Bundesliga championship round – South-West	2nd — Runners up
2014–15	Rugby-Bundesliga qualification round – South	2nd
2014–15	Rugby-Bundesliga championship round – South-West	2nd — Runners up
2015–16	Rugby-Bundesliga South-West	2nd — Champions

- Until 2001, when the single-division Bundesliga was established, the season was divided in autumn and spring, a Vorrunde and Endrunde, whereby the top teams of the Rugby-Bundesliga would play out the championship while the bottom teams together with the autumn 2nd Bundesliga champion would play for Bundesliga qualification. The remainder of the 2nd Bundesliga teams would play a spring round to determine the relegated clubs. Where two placing's are shown, the first is autumn, the second spring. In 2012 the Bundesliga was expanded from ten to 24 teams and the 2nd Bundesliga from 20 to 24 with the leagues divided into four regional divisions.

== Rugby internationals ==
In the 2010–12 campaign, Mustafa Güngör, Carlos Soteras Merz and Callum Sauer were selected from the club as German internationals.

For the opening match of the 2012–14 edition of the ENC against Ukraine the club had only Mustafa Güngör re-selected for the team while Rob May was a new addition to the club's list of German internationals.
