= Hamburg Exiles RFC =

German rugby union club, based in Hamburg

(Germany) Hamburg Exiles RFC
- Full name: Hamburg Exiles RFC
- Union: German Rugby Federation
- Founded: 1966; 60 years ago
- Location: Hamburg, Germany
- Ground: Saarlandstraße
- Chairman: Dr. Manfred Suhr
- Coach: Andre Van Niekerk
- Captain: Trevor Pretorius
- League: Rugby-Regionalliga
- 2023–24: Rugby-Verbandsliga
1st kit	2nd kit

Official website
- www.hamburg-exiles.de

The Hamburg Exiles Rugby Football Club is a German rugby union club from Hamburg, currently playing in the Rugby-Regionalliga North. The club organizes a yearly rugby sevens competition called the Hamburg Sevens.

The club fields one Mens team and plays back in the Regionalliga Nord since its first XV won the Verbandsliga Nord during the season 2024/2025. Prior the club had a separate seeder team, combining news players to Rugby Union from different clubs in Hamburg.

Despite playing Rugby, the clubs holds a strong focus on social events. Various events are organized throughout the year (Beach Rugby Tournament, Summer Tour, Hamburg 7s Tournament, Rugby Public Viewing... etc) to attract new players and give expats and locals an opportunity to get in touch with the club with the vision of being a Rugby Home for all Rugby lovers in Hamburg. The main social event of the year, the Hamburg Exiles Christmas Ball, takes place each first Saturday of December at the Hamburg City Hall.

== History ==
The Hamburg Exiles were formed in 1966 by foreign-born players of the FC St. Pauli Rugby and Hamburger RC teams who, feeling their clubs had not shielded them from changes in German Rugby Federation rules limiting how many foreign players could be fielded during a match, decided to found a club with a more international orientation. Today, the club members come from all five continents and most of Rugby Nations are being represented. The club tradition of wearing a black jersey, still in use today, was originally a tribute to the All Blacks.
