= RFC Bad Reichenhall =

German rugby union club, based in Bad Reichenhall

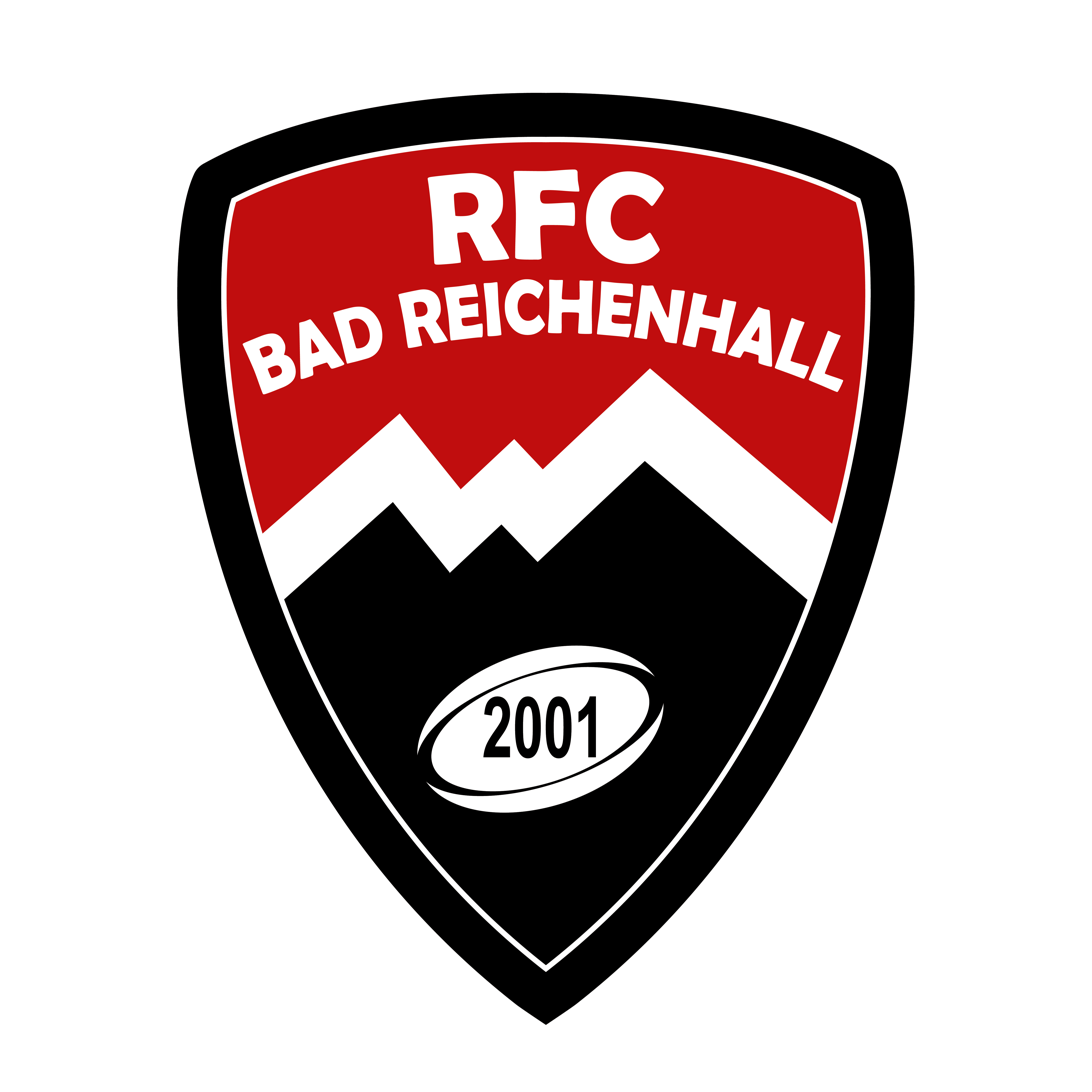

Club information
- Full name: Bad Reichenhall Rugby Union Football Club
- Colours: Red & Black
- Founded: 2001; 25 years ago
- Website: Bad Reichenhall RFC

Current details
- Ground: Schlossberg 16, Marzoll, Bad Reichenhall, Germany, 83435
- Competition: Regionalliga Bayern

A local newspaper article on the club and the development of rugby league in Germany.

Bad Reichenhall Rugby Union Football Club are a rugby union club from Bad Reichenhall, Germany.

Starting as a rugby league club in 2005, the club switched to rugby union in 2009.

Due to the proximity of Bad Reichenhall to Salzburg (12 km), the club also attracts many players from Austria.

== Men's Rugby ==
Since 2009, the men's XV team has participated at the third tier league of the German rugby union, the Regionalliga Bavaria, against clubs across southern Bavaria and eastern Austria.

== Women's Sevens Rugby ==
The women's team competes in seven a side competitions across Germany and Austria. The team has also often competed at the annual Innsbruck snow rugby event.

== Youth Rugby ==
The club encourages youth players to train at the club and then participate in the youth rugby events held in Munich.

== See also ==
- Rugby union in Germany
- Rugby union in Austria
