= Berlin Irish RFC =

German rugby union club, based in Berlin

Berlin Irish
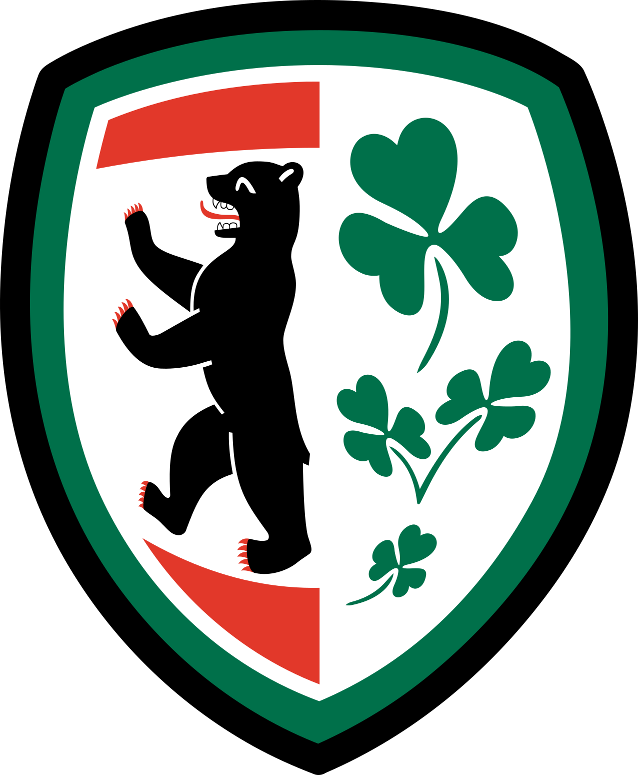
- Full name: Berlin Irish Rugby Football Club
- Union: German Rugby Federation
- Founded: 2016; 10 years ago
- Location: Berlin, Germany
- League: Rugby-Regionalliga

Official website
- berlin-irish.com

Berlin Irish RFC is a German rugby club from Berlin, currently playing rugby union in the Rugby-Regionalliga, and participating in the German Women's Sevens Series, as well as in the Berlin-Brandenburg Sevens Series.

The club was formed in 2016, having both women's and men's teams since the beginning. Later added several youth rugby divisions.

Since 2018 the Berlin Irish host an annual beach rugby tournament with a men's/mixed and women's competition at BeachMitte with teams visiting from all over Germany, Austria and the United Kingdom. After two events, there was a two-year break due to the COVID-19 pandemic, but the tournament resumed in 2022.

The mixed touch team, founded in 2024, includes participants of various genders, skill levels, and nationalities. Since 2026, it has been an official member of Touch Deutschland, the German national touch federation, and plays at local and national levels.
