= FT Adler Kiel Rugby =

German rugby union club, based in Kiel

(Germany) FT Adler Kiel Rugby
- Full name: Freie Turnerschaft Adler Kiel von 1893 e.V.
- Union: German Rugby Federation
- Founded: 1893; 133 years ago (club); 1999; 27 years ago (rugby department)
- Location: Kiel, Germany
- Ground: Professor Peters Platz
- Chairman: Klaus Schmäschke
- Captain: Christian Droll
- League: 2. Rugby-Bundesliga (II)
- 2015–16: 2. Rugby-Bundesliga North, 2nd

Official website
- kielrugby.de

The FT Adler Kiel Rugby is a German rugby union club from Kiel, currently playing in the 2nd Rugby-Bundesliga North/East. It is part of a larger club, the FT Adler Kiel, which also offers other sports like volleyball, table tennis and handball.

The term Adler is the German word for eagle.

== History ==
=== Origins ===
Kiel rugby began in the 1930s, when the local shipyards workers and German Navy members, then called the Reichsmarine, formed the 1. Kieler Rugby Fussball Verein.

In post-Second World War Germany, competitive rugby in Kiel resumed in 1949, when three local clubs competed in a league with clubs from Hamburg. The three clubs were the 1. Kieler Rugby Fussball Verein, PSV Kiel and FT Adler. Rugby in Kiel greatly benefited from a strong support through the British Army, which was stationed at Kiel-Holtenau.

Towards the end of the 1950s, Kiel rugby declined and the clubs were only able to field a combined team. In 1963, even this team had to be disbanded. As a form of farewell to rugby in Kiel, a final friendly match was organized. The match was against a team selected from a visiting detachment of the Japanese Navy. After this, rugby disappeared from the city for almost 30 years.

=== Current club ===
Rugby returned to Kiel in the late 1980s through the efforts of foreign students at Kiel University. The current rugby department of FT Adler was formed in 1997 however.

FT Adler took out the 2008 championship in the Regionalliga North but failed in the promotion round, losing on aggregate to RU Hohen Neuendorf.

The club earned promotion from the Rugby-Regionalliga North, after another championship there, to the 2nd Rugby-Bundesliga, the second tier of German club rugby, in 2009.

Kiel lasted for only one season at this level before being relegated again to the Regionalliga, where it came fourth in 2010-11. At the end of the 2014–15 season the club was promoted back to the 2nd Rugby-Bundesliga after a Regionalliga championship.

== Club honours ==
- Rugby-Regionalliga North
  - Champions: 2008, 2009, 2015

== Recent seasons ==
Recent seasons of the club:

Year	Division	Position
2005-06	Rugby-Regionalliga North (III)	3rd
2006–07	Rugby-Regionalliga North	6th
2007–08	Rugby-Regionalliga North	1st
2008–09	Rugby-Regionalliga North	1st — Promoted
2009–10	2nd Rugby-Bundesliga North/East (II)	9th — Relegated
2010–11	Rugby-Regionalliga North (III)	4th
2011–12	Rugby-Regionalliga North	5th
2012–13	Rugby-Regionalliga North	2nd
2013–14	Rugby-Regionalliga North	4th
2014–15	Rugby-Regionalliga North	1st — Promoted
2015–16	2nd Rugby-Bundesliga North	2nd
2016–17	2nd Rugby-Bundesliga North	5th
2017–18	2nd Rugby-Bundesliga North	5th
