= Karlsruher SV Rugby =

German rugby union club, based in Karlsruhe

(Germany) Karlsruher SV Rugby
- Full name: Karlsruher Sportverein Rintheim-Waldstadt e.V.
- Union: German Rugby Federation
- Founded: 1991; 35 years ago
- Location: Karlsruhe, Germany
- Ground: Traugott-Bender-Sportpark
- Chairman: Nikolai Naumann
- Coach: Uwe Jansen
- League: 2. Rugby-Bundesliga (II)
- 2015–16: 2nd

Official website
- karlsruher-sv.de/category/verein/rugby/

The Karlsruher SV Rugby is a German rugby union club from Karlsruhe, currently playing in the 2. Rugby-Bundesliga. It is part of a larger club, the Karlsruher SV, which also offers other sports like tennis and association football.

== History ==
The KSV was formed in 1991 through a merger of to local clubs, the FC Nordstern Rintheim, formed 1909, and the FC Waldstadt, formed in 1962.

The clubs rugby department achieved promotion to the 2. Rugby-Bundesliga from the Rugby-Regionalliga in 2003, finishing fifth in the new league in its first season there.

The second season ended with relegation back to the Regionalliga and it took the club until 2009, to return to the second division. Hopelessly outclassed at this level, the club withdrew its team from the competition at the winter break, KSV therefore being automatically relegated from the league. In 2010-11 KSV made a new start playing in the lowest league, the Rugby-Verbandsliga Baden-Württemberg, the fifth division, to rebuild and restructure the squad and management of the rugby department. In 2011-12 the team played in the Regionalliga Baden-Württemberg and finished in 2nd place. Since the 2012-13 season KSV plays in the 3rd Liga South/West. They finished the 2015-2016 Season in 2nd place and got repromoted to the 2. Rugby-Bundesliga, after winning the Playoff-Games against RC Unterföhring.

== Women's team ==
The Women's team is currently competing in the german-Rugby sevens-championship for women.

== Club honours ==
- Rugby-Regionalliga Baden-Württemberg
  - Champions: 2009

== Recent seasons ==
Recent seasons of the club:

Year	Division	Position
2001-02	Rugby-Regionalliga Baden-Württemberg (III)	6th
2002-03	Rugby-Regionalliga Baden-Württemberg	4th—Promoted
2003-04	2nd Rugby-Bundesliga South/West (II)	5th
2004-05	2nd Rugby-Bundesliga South/West	9th—Relegated
2005-08	did not compete ^{1}	
2008–09	Rugby-Regionalliga Baden-Württemberg (III)	1st—Promoted
2009–10	2nd Rugby-Bundesliga South/West (II)	10th—Relegated
2010–11	Verbandsliga Baden-Württemberg (V)	?
2011–12	Regionalliga Baden-Württemberg (IV)	2nd—Promoted
2012–13	3rd Liga South/West—South (III)	2nd—Semi finals
2013–14	3rd Liga South/West—South	3rd — Quarter finals
2014–15	3rd Liga South/West—South	4th
2015–16	3rd Liga South/West—South	2nd—Promoted
2016–17	2. Rugby-Bundesliga	-

- ^{1} From 2005 to 2008, the club did not field an independent team but rather played in a partnership with clubs from Heidelberg and Pforzheim
