= Rugby-Regionalliga =

German 3rd tier rugby union competition

- Sport: Rugby union
- No. of teams: 47
- Country: Germany
- Most recent champions: FT Adler Kiel; USV Potsdam; ASV Köln II; SCW Göttingen; RC Regensburg

The Rugby Regionalliga is the third-highest level of Germany's Rugby union league system, organised by the German Rugby Federation. It is set below the 2nd Rugby-Bundesliga and is organised in eight regional divisions.

Since 2010, the Regionalliga is only the fourth level of play in Southern Germany, since the inception of the 3rd Liga South/West, which covers the same states as the 2nd Rugby-Bundesliga South/West above it except Bavaria.

== History ==
The Regionalligas form the third tier of German rugby union since the inception of the 2nd Rugby-Bundesliga in the early 1990s. Before that, the league was the second tier, below the Rugby-Bundesliga. Below the Regionalliga sits the Rugby-Verbandsliga, however, in some regions, the Regionalliga is the lowest division and no Verbandsliga exists.

The six leagues cover the following states:

- Regionalliga North
  - Bremen
  - Hamburg
  - Lower Saxony (northern parts)
  - Mecklenburg-Vorpommern
  - Schleswig-Holstein
- Regionalliga East A & B
  - Berlin
  - Brandenburg
  - Saxony
  - Saxony-Anhalt
  - Thuringia
- Regionalliga West
  - Hesse (northern part)
  - Lower Saxony (southern parts)
  - Luxembourg
  - North Rhine-Westphalia
  - Rhineland-Palatinate
  - Saarland
- Regionalliga Hesse
  - Hesse (except most northern part)
- Regionalliga Baden-Württemberg
  - Baden-Württemberg
- Regionalliga Bavaria
  - Bavaria
  - Baden-Württemberg (Ulm region)
  - Austria (Innsbruck)

The champions of the different league divisions, as well as league champions play-off at the end of the season for 2nd Bundesliga promotion. The champions of the RL West and RL Hesse determine the promoted team for the 2. Bundesliga West, RL Baden-Württemberg and RL Bavaria determine the promoted team to the 2. Bundesliga South, whereas RL North and RL East determine the promoted team to the 2. Bundesliga North and East respectively.

== Clubs participating in 2018-19 ==
Regionalliga - 60 teams (66 clubs)
| RL North DSV 78 Hannover II • FC St. Pauli II • Northern Lions • SC Germania List II • SG Hamburg Exiles RFC/Hamburger SV • TuS Lübeck 1893 • Welfen Braunschweig | RL North-East Group A Berliner SV 1892 II • Berlin Bruisers • Berliner RC III • RU Hohen Neuendorf • SC Siemensstadt; Group B Berlin Grizzlies II • Berliner SC • RK 03 Berlin II • RV Leipzig Scorpions • SG Berlin Irish RFC/RC Trebbin • USV Halle Rovers | RL West Rhineland Division; RC Aachen II • RC Bonn-Rhein-Sieg • RSV Köln II • SG Bochum/Witten RFC/Rugby Tourists Münster II • SG RC Hürth/WMTV Solingen Zebras • TuS 95 Düsseldorf II; Westphalia Division; SCW Göttingen • RC Bielefeld • RC Osnabrück • RFC Dortmund • RFC Paderborn • Rugby Cassel • Wiedenbrücker TV; RP-LUX Division; FSV Trier-Tarforst • RC Luxembourg II • RC Mainz • RC Walferdange • SG 2018 Hochspeyer • SG RC Worms/SV Südwest Ludwigshafen 1882 | RL Hesse BSC Offenbach • Eintracht Frankfurt • RK Heusenstamm II • RU Marburg • SC Frankfurt 1880 III • SG TSV Krofdorf-Gleiberg/SC Riedberg • TG 75 Darmstadt • URC Gießen 01 | RL Baden-Württemberg Freiburger RC • Karlsruher SV • Neckarsulmer SU II • RC Konstanz • RC Hirschau Tübingen • RG Heidelberg II • TSV Handschuhsheim II | RL Bayern BTS 1861 Bayreuth • München RFC II • RC Regensburg 2000 • RFC Augsburg e.V. • RFC Bad Reichenhall • StuSta München II • TSB Ravensburg Raven s • Würzburger RK 2012 e.V. |

Verbandsliga - 30 teams (39 clubs)
| Verbandsliga North North-East; FC St. Pauli III • FT Adler Kiel II • Hamburger RC II • VfL Jesteburg Wombats • RSG M-V (SG Rugby Fortuna Neuenkirchen/Rugby Rostock Dierkower Elche/Rugby Wismar Freibeuter) • SG Hamburger SV/Hamburg Exiles RFC II; North-West; SG SV Bethen/Bremen 1860 II • SG SV Odin Hannover II/VfR Döhren II • SG Schaumburg Royals RFC/VT Union Groß Ilsede • SV 08 Ricklingen • TSV Karlshöfen • TSV Victoria Linden II • Union 60 Bremen | Verbandsliga NRW Brühler TV 1879 • DJK VFL Willich • RC 1960 Hürth II • RSV Köln III • TV Jahn-Rheine Warriors • Wiedenbrücker TV II | VL Baden-Württemberg 6 Tournaments | VL Bayern Allgäu Rugby • FC Eintracht Bamberg • RC Innsbruck • SG 1. SC Gröbenzell/RC Landsberg am Lech • SG TuS Fürstenfeldbrück/TeamMünchen • SG RC Unterföhring II/TV 1861 Ingolstadt • StuSta München III • TSV Nördlingen • TSV 1846 Nürnberg II • TV 1848 Coburg • VFB Ulm |

== Champions ==
=== Northern Germany ===
| Year | North | Lower Saxony | North-East | North Rhine-Westphalia |
| 2000-01 | | DRC Hannover II | | TuS 95 Düsseldorf |
| 2000-01 | | SC Germania List II | | RC Hürth |
| 2001-02 | | Hamburger RC | | Wiedenbrücker TV |
| 2001-02 | | Hamburger RC | | RC Aachen |
| 2002-03 | | DRC Hannover II | | Wiedenbrücker TV |
| 2003-04 | | SV Odin Hannover | | Wiedenbrücker TV |
| 2004-05 | | Stahl Brandenburg Rugby | | Wiedenbrücker TV |
| 2005-06 | Dynamo Rostock | Hamburger RC | | RC Aachen |
| 2006-07 | FC St. Pauli II | VfR Döhren | | Wiedenbrücker TV |
| 2007-08 | FT Adler Kiel Rugby | SG Schwalbe/DRC Hannover II | Berliner RC II | TuS 95 Düsseldorf |
| 2007-08 | FT Adler Kiel Rugby | SG Schwalbe/DRC Hannover II | Berliner RC II | TuS 95 Düsseldorf |
| 2008-09 | FT Adler Kiel Rugby | DSV 78/08 Ricklingen II | RK 03 Berlin II | TuS 95 Düsseldorf |
| 2008-09 | FT Adler Kiel Rugby | Welfen Braunschweig | RK 03 Berlin II | TuS 95 Düsseldorf |
| 2009-10 | Hamburg Exiles RFC | FC Schwalbe Hannover | RK 03 Berlin II | RC Bonn-Rhein-Sieg |
| 2010-11 | Welfen Braunschweig | | RK 03 Berlin II | Wiedenbrücker TV |
| 2011-12 | 08 Ricklingen/Wunstorf | | SG Grizzlies/Potsdam | Grashof RC Essen |
| 2012-13 | DRC Hannover | | RU Hohen Neuendorf | RT Münster |
| 2013-14 | SG Odin/Döhren | | RK 03 Berlin II | RT Münster |
| 2014-15 | FT Adler Kiel Rugby | | USV Potsdam | ASV Köln II |

- Until 2002, North Rhine-Westphalia played a separate spring and autumn championship.
- In 2004, 2005, 2006 and 2007, Lower Saxony and East played a combined North/East championship in spring.
- Until 2001 and from 2007 to 2009, Lower Saxony played a separate spring and autumn championship.
- From 2010-11 onwards no separate Regionalliga North was played.

=== Southern Germany ===
| Year | Rhineland-Palatinate | Hesse | Baden-Württemberg | Bavaria |
| 2000-01 | RC Mainz | | | München RFC II |
| 2000-01 | Ramstein RFC | | | München RFC II |
| 2001-02 | RC Mainz | Eintracht Frankfurt Rugby | TSV Handschuhsheim II | StuSta München |
| 2002-03 | FSV Trier-Tarforst | Eintracht Frankfurt Rugby | SC Neuenheim II/Pforzheim | TSV 1846 Nürnberg |
| 2003-04 | RC Mainz | RU Marburg | RG Heidelberg II | StuSta München |
| 2004-05 | | | | TSV 1846 Nürnberg |
| 2005-06 | SC 1880 Frankfurt II | | SG Karlsruhe/Pforzheim | TSV 1846 Nürnberg |
| 2006-07 | RC Mainz | RC Mainz | Stuttgarter RC | VfB Ulm |
| 2007-08 | RC Worms | RK Heusenstamm II | Heidelberger RK II | TSV 1846 Nürnberg |
| 2008-09 | FSV Trier-Tarforst | RK Heusenstamm II | Karlsruher SV Rugby | RC Regensburg |
| 2009-10 | FSV Trier-Tarforst | Eintracht Frankfurt Rugby | Heidelberger TV | TSV 1846 Nürnberg |
| 2010-11 | Ramstein Rogues RFC | RK Heusenstamm II | Freiburger RC | RC Regensburg |
| 2011-12 | RC Worms | RK Heusenstamm II | TV Pforzheim II | RFC Bad Reichenhall |
| 2012-13 | RC Luxemburg II | BSC Offenbach | not held | RFC Bad Reichenhall |
| 2013-14 | RC Luxemburg II | URC Gießen 01 | not held | RFC Augsburg |
| 2014-15 | ASV Köln II | SCW Göttingen | not held | RC Regensburg |
| 2015-16 | RT Münster | URC Gießen 01 | not held | München RFC II |
| 2016-17 | ASV Köln II | URC Gießen 01 | Heidelberger RK II | TSV 1846 Nürnberg |
| 2017-18 | RC Bonn-Rhein-Sieg | RK Heusenstamm II | Heidelberger RK II | TSV 1846 Nürnberg |
| 2018-19 | | BSC Offenbach | SC Karlsruhe | |

- In 2006-07, RC Mainz competed in both Hesse and Rhineland-Palatinate.
- In 2005-06, Hesse and Rhineland-Palatinate played a combined championship.
- Until 2001, Bavaria played a separate spring and autumn championship.
- Until 2001, Rhineland-Palatinate played a separate spring and autumn championship.
- For the 2018-20 season, Rhineland-Palatinate formed a 3 pool competition Rheinland / Westfalen / Rheinland-Pfalz&Luxemburg with the addition of RC Walferdange (Luxemburg) - the second team from that country to join the Germany National competition after RC Luxemburg with a 1st and 2nd XV.

== Placings ==
=== North ===
The league placings in the Regionalliga North:

| Club | 00 | 01 | 02 | 03 | 04 | 05 | 06 | 07 | 08 | 09 | 10 | 11 | 12 | 13 | 14 | 15 | 16 |
| Hamburger RC ^{3} | ♦ | ♦ | | ♦ | ♦ | ♦ | 4 | ♦ | ♦ | ♦ | ♦ | ♦ | ♦ | ♦ | ♦ | ♦ | ♦ |
| Welfen Braunschweig ^{2} | | | | | | | | | | | 3 | 1 | ♦ | ♦ | ♦ | ♦ | ♦ |
| DSV 78 Hannover II | | | | | | | | | | | | | 2 | ♦ | ♦ | ♦ | ♦ |
| Bremen 1860 | | | | | | | | | | 6 | 5 | 3 | 3 | ♦ | ♦ | ♦ | ♦ |
| DRC Hannover | ♦ | ♦ | ♦ | ♦ | ♦ | ♦ | ♦ | ♦ | ♦ | ♦ | ♦ | ♦ | ♦ | 1 | ♦ | ♦ | ♦ |
| SG SV Odin/VfR Döhren | | | | | | | | | | ♦ | ♦ | ♦ | 8 | 3 | 1 | ♦ | ♦ |
| FT Adler Kiel Rugby | | | | | | | 3 | 6 | 1 | 1 | ♦ | 4 | 5 | 2 | 4 | 1 | ♦ |
| Northern Lions | | | | | | | | | | | | | | | | 2 | x |
| FC St. Pauli Rugby II | | | | | | | 5 | 1 | 6 | 5 | 4 | 6 | 6 | ♦ | 2 | 3 | x |
| Union 60 Bremen | | | | | | | | | | 4 | 6 | 8 | 4 | ♦ | ♦ | 4 | x |
| Hamburg Exiles RFC | | | | | | | 8 | 4 | 2 | 2 | 1 | 7 | 9 | 5 | 6 | 5 | x |
| TuS Lübeck | | | | | | | | | | | | | | | | 6 | x |
| SC Germania List II | | | | | | | | | | | | | | | 3 | | x |
| 08 Ricklingen/Wunstorf | | | | | | | | | | | | 2 | 1 | ♦ | ♦ | | |
| SG Varel/Oldenburg | | | | | | | | | | | | | | | 5 | | |
| Union 60 Bremen II | | | | | | | | | | | | | | | 7 | | |
| FC St. Pauli III | | | | | | | | | | | | | | 4 | | | |
| VfL Jesteburg | | | | | | | 7 | | | | | | | 6 | | | |
| Bremen 1860 II | | | | | | | | | | | | | | 7 | | | |
| FC Schwalbe Hannover | | | | | | | | | | | | 5 | 7 | | | | |
| SG Jesteburg/Geesthacht ^{1} | | | | | | | | 2 | 3 | 3 | 2 | 9 | 10 | | | | |
| RSG M-V | | | | | | | 1 | 7 | 7 | 7 | | | | | | | |
| SC Varel | | | | | | | 6 | 3 | 4 | 8 | | | | | | | |
| RG Bremen | | | | | | | 2 | 5 | 5 | | | | | | | | |
| Hamburger SV Rugby | | | | | | | | 8 | | | | | | | | | |
| VfL Geesthacht | | | | | | | w | | | | | | | | | | |

- ^{1} Combined team of VfL Jesteburg and VfL Geesthacht.
- ^{2} Welfen Braunschweig played in the Regionalliga Lower Saxony until 2009.
- ^{3} Hamburger RC also played in the North/East championship in spring 2006.

=== Lower Saxony ===
The league placings in the Regionalliga Lower Saxony. The league has been defunct since the end of the 2009–10 season:

| Club | 00 | | 01 | | 02 | 03 | 04 | | 05 | | 06 | | 07 | | 08 | | 09 | | 10 |
| Club | A | S | A | S | 02 | 03 | A | S | A | S | A | S | A | S | A | S | A | S | 10 |
| Hamburger RC | ♦ | ♦ | 2 | ♦ | 1 | ♦ | ♦ | | ♦ | | | 1 | ♦ | | ♦ | | ♦ | | ♦ |
| FC Schwalbe Hannover | | | | | | 2 | ♦ | | | | | | | | | | | | 1 |
| SC Germania List II | | 4 | 3 | 1 | | | 4 | 2 | | | | 5 | 5 | 3 | 4 | 6 | 6 | 6 | 2 |
| TSV Victoria Linden II | | 6 | | | | | 3 | 7 | | | | 4 | 6 | 4 | 2 | 5 | 5 | 5 | 3 |
| SV 08 Ricklingen | ♦ | ♦ | ♦ | ♦ | ♦ | ♦ | | | | | | | | | | | | | 4 |
| DSV 78 Hannover II | | 5 | w | | | | | | | | | | | | | | | | 5 |
| SG SV Odin/VfR Döhren II ^{1} | | | | | | | | | | | | | | | 3 | 2 | 2 | 2 | 6 |
| FC Rastede | | | | | | | | | | | | | | | | | | | 7 |
| RSV Göttingen | | | | | | | | | | | | | | | | | 4 | 4 | 8 |
| SG Schwalbe/DRC II ^{4} | | | | | | | | | | | | 2 | 2 | 5 | 1 | 1 | ♦ | | |
| Welfen Braunschweig ^{3} | | ♦ | 4 | ♦ | 4 | 4 | | 4 | | 5 | | 2 | | 5 | 6 | 3 | 3 | 1 | |
| DSV 78/08 Ricklingen II ^{2} | | | | | | | 5 | 1 | | | | 1 | 1 | 1 | 5 | 4 | 1 | 3 | |
| SV Odin Hannover | | 2 | 5 | 3 | 3 | 3 | 1 | 1 | ♦ | | ♦ | | ♦ | | ♦ | | | | |
| SV Odin Hannover II | | | | | | | | | | | | 3 | 4 | 2 | | | | | |
| VfR Döhren | ♦ | ♦ | ♦ | ♦ | ♦ | ♦ | ♦ | | ♦ | | | 4 | 3 | 1 | | | | | |
| VfR Döhren II | | | | | | | | 3 | | | | | | | | | | | |
| Union 60 Bremen | | | | | | | | 4 | | | | | | | | | | | |
| Welfen Braunschweig II | | | | | | | | 5 | | | | | | | | | | | |
| DRC Hannover II | | 1 | 1 | 2 | 2 | 1 | 2 | 6 | | | | | | | | | | | |
| Victoria Linden II/DSV 78 II ^{5} | | | | 4 | 5 | | | | | | | | | | | | | | |
| VfR Döhren/Schwalbe II ^{6} | | 3 | | | | | | | | | | | | | | | | | |

- Until 2001, the league was played in an autumn (A) and a spring (S) championship, with the autumn champion receiving the opportunity to play in the 2nd Rugby-Bundesliga North/East qualification round in spring. From 2003 to 2009, the league was once more divided into autumn and spring. From 2004 to 2007, a North/East championship was played in spring. Since 2010, the clubs from Lower Saxony play in the Regionalliga North and no Regionalliga Lower Saxony exists.
- ^{1} Combined reserves team of SV Odin Hannover and VfR Döhren.
- ^{2} Combined reserves team of DSV 78 Hannover and SV 08 Ricklingen.
- ^{3} Played in the Regionalliga North in 2009-10.
- ^{4} Combined team of FC Schwalbe Hannover and the reserve team of DRC Hannover.
- ^{5} Combined reserves team of TSV Victoria Linden and DSV 78 Hannover.
- ^{6} Combined reserves team of FC Schwalbe Hannover and VfR Döhren.
- ^{7} Hamburger RC also played in the Regionalliga North championship in 2005-06.

=== East ===
The league placings in the Regionalliga East:

| Club | 00 | | 01 | | 02 | | 03 | | 04 | | 05 | | 06 | | 07 | | 08 | 09 | 10 | | 11 | 12 | 13 | 14 | 15 | 16 |
| Club | A | S | A | S | A | S | A | S | A | S | A | S | A | S | A | S | 08 | 09 | A | S | 11 | 12 | 13 | 14 | 15 | 16 |
| RC Leipzig | | | | | | | | | | | 3 | 1 | 8 | 2 | 3 | 2 | 7 | 6 | 10 | 4 | 10 | 2 | ♦ | ♦ | ♦ | ♦ |
| RV Dresden | | | | | | | | | 2 | 4 | 7 | 4 | 7 | 2 | 7 | 2 | 8 | 8 | 8 | 5 | 9 | 4 | ♦ | ♦ | ♦ | ♦ |
| USV Jena | | | | | | | | | | | 8 | 5 | 3 | 3 | 5 | 4 | 3 | 4 | 7 | 2 | 4 | 5 | ♦ | ♦ | ♦ | ♦ |
| Berliner SC | | | | | | | | | 4 | 5 | 1 | 2 | 6 | 4 | 2 | 4 | 6 | 7 | 11 | 6 | 7 | 6 | ♦ | ♦ | ♦ | ♦ |
| Veltener RC | | | | | | | | | 8 | 1 | 6 | 3 | 5 | 3 | 4 | 3 | 4 | 5 | 5 | 5 | 3 | 8 | ♦ | ♦ | ♦ | ♦ |
| RU Hohen Neuendorf | | | | ♦ | | ♦ | | | ♦ | | ♦ | | ♦ | | 3 | 4 | 2 | ♦ | ♦ | | ♦ | ♦ | 1 | ♦ | ♦ | ♦ |
| Berliner RC II | | | | | | | | | 6 | 1 | 1 | 4 | 2 | 6 | 2 | 2 | 1 | 2 | ♦ | | ♦ | 3 | 2 | 2 | ♦ | ♦ |
| USV Halle | | | | | | | | | | | | | | | | | | | | | | | 6 | 3 | ♦ | ♦ |
| USV Potsdam Rugby | | | | | | | | | 2 | 3 | 3 | 3 | ♦ | | ♦ | | ♦ | ♦ | ♦ | | ♦ | ♦ | ♦ | ♦ | 1 | ♦ |
| Berliner SV 92 Rugby | | | | | | | | | 5 | 3 | 5 | 1 | 4 | 1 | 1 | 3 | ♦ | ♦ | 2 | 1 | 2 | ♦ | ♦ | ♦ | ♦ | x |
| SC Siemensstadt | ♦ | ♦ | ♦ | ♦ | ♦ | | ♦ | | 1 | 2 | ♦ | | 3 | 5 | 6 | 1 | 3 | 3 | 3 | 3 | ♦ | 7 | ♦ | ♦ | ♦ | x |
| RK 03 Berlin II | | | | | | | | | 7 | 2 | 2 | 2 | 1 | 3 | 5 | 5 | 1 | 1 | 1 | 2 | 1 | 9 | 3 | 1 | 2 | x |
| RC Leipzig II | | | | | | | | | | | | | | | | | | | | | | | | 4 | 4 | x |
| Berliner RC III | | | | | | | | | | | | | | | | | | 2 | 9 | 3 | 8 | | | | 5 | x |
| Stahl Brandenburg Rugby | | ♦ | ♦ | ♦ | ♦ | | | | 3 | 2 | 4 | 1 | ♦ | | ♦ | | 5 | 4 | 4 | 4 | 5 | 10 | 5 | 5 | 6 | x |
| RL Berlin Bruisers | | | | | | | | | | | | | | | | | | | | | | | | | 7 | x |
| RC Berlin Grizzlies | | | | | | | | | | | | | | | | | | | | | | | | | | x |
| SG Hennigsdorf/Hohen Neuendorf II | | | | | | | | | | | | | | | | | | | | | | | | | | x |
| SG BSC II/VRC II | | | | | | | | | | | | | | | | | | | | | | | | | | x |
| Stahl Hennigsdorf Rugby | ♦ | ♦ | ♦ | ♦ | ♦ | | ♦ | | ♦ | | ♦ | | ♦ | | | | | 1 | 6 | 1 | 6 | 11 | 4 | 6 | 3 | |
| SG Grizzlies/Potsdam ^{3} | | | | | | | | | | | | | | | | | | | | | | 1 | ♦ | | | |
| RU Hohen Neuendorf II | | | | | | | | | | | 2 | 2 | | | 4 | 5 | | 5 | | | 11 | 12 | | | | |
| RK 03 Berlin III | | | | | | | | | | | | | 1 | 5 | 1 | 1 | 4 | 3 | | | | | | | | |
| SG H.Neuendorf/Hennigsdorf ^{1} | | | | | | | | | | | | | | | | | 2 | | | | | | | | | |
| SSV Erfurt Oaks | | | | | | | | | | | | | | | | | 5 | | | | | | | | | |
| Thüringer SV | | | | | | | | | 4 | 4 | 4 | 3 | 2 | 1 | 8 | 3 | | | | | | | | | | |
| RV Dresden II | | | | | | | | | | | 6 | | 4 | 4 | | | | | | | | | | | | |
| RV Dresden II/SASV ^{2} | | | | | | | | | | | | 4 | | | | | | | | | | | | | | |
| Sachsen-Anhalter SV | | | | | | | | | | | 5 | | | | | | | | | | | | | | | |
| Mitteldeutsche SV | | | | | | | | | 1 | 5 | | | | | | | | | | | | | | | | |
| TSV Leipzig-Wahren | | | | | | | | | 3 | 3 | | | | | | | | | | | | | | | | |
| RC Staßfurt | | | | | | | | | | 5 | | | | | | | | | | | | | | | | |

| A division | B division |

- Until 2007 and again in 2009-10, the league was played in an autumn (A) and a spring (S) championship, with the autumn champion, until 2001, receiving the opportunity to play in the 2nd Rugby-Bundesliga North/East qualification round in spring.
  - In 2003-04, the league was divided into a northern and a southern group, which played in autumn. The top two teams from the north and the best team from the south then played in the North/East championship in spring. The remaining top teams in each group then played in placings round 1 while the bottom teams played in round 2.
  - From 2004-05 to 2006-07, the league was played in an A and a B division in autumn. The best teams from the A division then played in the North/East championship in spring. The remaining teams from the A division and the winner of B then played in the placings round 1. The worst team in the A group and the rest of B played in round 2.
  - In 2007-08 and 2008–09, an A and a B division existed with a standard home-and-away season and no separate autumn and spring rounds.
  - In 2009-10, all clubs in the East played a single autumn round in one division. The top five then played in the A division in spring while the bottom six played in the B division.
- ^{1} Combined team of the reserve side of RU Hohen Neuendorf and Stahl Hennigsdorf Rugby.
- ^{2} Combined team of the reserve side of RV Dresden and Sachsen-Anhalter SV.
- ^{3} Combined team of the reserve side of USV Potsdam Rugby and Berlin Grizzlies.

=== North Rhine-Westphalia ===
The league placings in the Regionalliga North Rhine-Westphalia:

| Club | 01 | | 02 | | 03 | 04 | 05 | 06 | 07 | 08 | 09 | 10 | 11 | 12 | 13 | 14 | 15 | 16 |
| Club | A | S | A | S | 03 | 04 | 05 | 06 | 07 | 08 | 09 | 10 | 11 | 12 | 13 | 14 | 15 | 16 |
| TuS 95 Düsseldorf | 1 | ♦ | ♦ | | ♦ | 2 | 2 | 2 | 2 | 1 | 1 | 4 | ♦ | ♦ | ♦ | ♦ | ♦ | ♦ |
| RC Aachen | ♦ | ♦ | 2 | 1 | 4 | 3 | 3 | 1 | ♦ | 3 | 3 | 2 | ♦ | ♦ | ♦ | ♦ | ♦ | ♦ |
| RC Bonn Rhein-Sieg | ♦ | ♦ | | | 3 | 7 | 6 | 5 | 3 | 4 | 4 | 1 | ♦ | ♦ | ♦ | ♦ | ♦ | x |
| ASV Köln Rugby II | 5 | | | | | | | 3 | 5 | 7 | 6 | 9 | 3 | 2 | 2 | 2 | 1 | x |
| RT Münster | | | 5 | 5 | 7 | 8 | 8 | 6 | 4 | 6 | 8 | w | | 3 | 1 | 2 | 2 | x |
| Grashof RC Essen | | | | | | | | | | | | | 2 | 1 | ♦ | 1 | 3 | x |
| Wiedenbrücker TV | 2 | 3 | 1 | 2 | 1 | 1 | 1 | 4 | 1 | 5 | 7 | 3 | 1 | ♦ | ♦ | 1 | 4 | x |
| TuS 95 Düsseldorf II | | | | | | | | | | | | | | | 9 | 4 | 5 | x |
| Bochum Witten RFC | | | | | | | | | | | | | | | 7 | 4 | 6 | x |
| WMTV Solingen | | | | | 5 | 4 | | | | | | 6 | | 5 | 5 | 3 | 7 | x |
| RFC Dortmund | | | | | | | | | | | | | | 7 | 8 | 5 | 8 | x |
| RC Aachen II | | | | | | | | | | | | | | 6 | 4 | 6 | 9 | x |
| RC Bielefeld | | | | | 9 | | | | | | | | | | | 7 | 10 | x |
| RC Hürth | 3 | 1 | 3 | 4 | 2 | 6 | | | | | | | 4 | 4 | 6 | 5 | 11 | x |
| FSV Trier-Tarforst | | | | | | | | | | | | | | | | | | x |
| DJK Andernach | | | | | | | | | | | | | | | | | | x |
| RC Paderborn | | | | | | | | | | | | | | | | | | x |
| RC Osnabrück | | | | | | | | | | | | | | | | | | x |
| TV Lemgo | | | | | | | | | | | | | | | 3 | 3 | | |
| SV Ibbenbüren | | | | | | | | | | | | | | | | 6 | | |
| Münster Marauders | | | | | | | | | | | | 5 | | | | | | |
| RC Mönchengladbach Rhinos | | | | | | | | | | 2 | 5 | 7 | | | | | | |
| Elmpt Falcons | | | | | | | | | | | 2 | 8 | | | | | | |
| SG Hürth/Brühl ^{1} | | | | | | | 5 | 8 | 6 | 8 | 9 | | | | | | | |
| Lippe Lions Lemgo | | | | | | | 4 | 7 | 7 | 9 | 10 | | | | | | | |
| WMTV Solingen/SVD Sundwig ^{2} | | | | 6 | | | 7 | | | | | | | | | | | |
| RSV Detmold | 4 | 2 | 4 | 3 | 6 | 5 | | | | | | | | | | | | |
| TV Aldenrade | | | | | 8 | | | | | | | | | | | | | |
| TW Hemer | | 4 | 6 | | | | | | | | | | | | | | | |
| RC Krefeld | 6 | 5 | | | | | | | | | | | | | | | | |

- Until 2002, the league was played in an autumn (A) and a spring (S) championship, with the autumn champion, until 2001, receiving the opportunity to play in the 2nd Rugby-Bundesliga South/West qualification round in spring. Since the 2013–14 season the league has been split into a Rhineland and Westphalia division.
- ^{1} Combined team of Brühler TV and RC Hürth.
- ^{2} Combined team of WMTV Solingen and SVD Sundwig.

=== Rhineland-Palatinate ===
The league placings in the Regionalliga Rhineland-Palatinate. The league has been defunct since the end of the 2013–14 season:

| Club | 01 | | 02 | 03 | 04 | 05 | 06 | 07 | 08 | 09 | 10 | 11 | 12 | 13 | 14 |
| Club | A | S | 02 | 03 | 04 | 05 | 06 | 07 | 08 | 09 | 10 | 11 | 12 | 13 | 14 |
| RC Mainz ^{3} ^{4} | 1 | 4 | 1 | ♦ | 1 | | 2 | 1 | ♦ | ♦ | ♦ | ♦ | ♦ | ♦ | ♦ |
| SC 1880 Frankfurt II ^{4} | | | | | | | 1 | ♦ | ♦ | ♦ | ♦ | ♦ | ♦ | ♦ | ♦ |
| Eintracht Frankfurt Rugby ^{4} | | | | | | | 4 | | | | | | ♦ | ♦ | ♦ |
| RC Worms | 5 | 5 | 4 | 3 | 4 | | 8 | | 1 | 4 | 4 | 3 | 1 | ♦ | ♦ |
| FSV Trier-Tarforst | 2 | 2 | 3 | 1 | 2 | | | 2 | | 1 | 1 | ♦ | ♦ | 2 | ♦ |
| RC Luxembourg II | | | | | | | | | | | | 2 | 2 | 1 | 1 |
| RC Mainz II | | | | | | | | | | | | | 6 | 5 | 2 |
| DJK Andernach | | | | | | | | | | 6 | 6 | 6 | 4 | 4 | 3 |
| Stade Sarrois Rugby | | | | | | | | | | 5 | 2 | 4 | 7 | 6 | 4 |
| Ramstein Rogues RFC | 4 | 1 | 2 | 2 | 3 | | 5 | 3 | 3 | 2 | 3 | 1 | ♦ | ♦ | |
| Ramstein Rogues RFC II | | | | | | | | | | | | | 3 | 3 | |
| TuS Hochspeyer | | | | | | | | | | | | 5 | 5 | 7 | |
| SG Mainz/Worms II | | | | | | | | | | | | 7 | | | |
| RC Kaiserslautern | | | | | | | | 5 | 4 | 3 | 5 | | | | |
| Baumholder RFC | 3 | 3 | w | w | | | | | | | 6 | | | | |
| VfL Pünderich | | | | | | | | | | | w | | | | |
| TB Rohrbach | | | | | | | | | | | w | | | | |
| SG Trier/Andernach ^{1} | | | | | | | | | 2 | | | | | | |
| RU Marburg ^{4} | | | | | | | 3 | ♦ | | | | | | | |
| SG Worms/Speyer ^{2} | | | | | | | | 4 | | | | | | | |
| Blau-Gelb Darmstadt ^{4} | | | | | | | 6 | | | | | | | | |
| URC Gießen 01 ^{4} | | | | | | | 7 | | | | | | | | |
| SG Horrweiler/Mainz II ^{6} | | | | w | | | | | | | | | | | |
| TuS Horrweiler | | | 5 | | | | | | | | | | | | |
| RC Ludwigshafen | w | | | | | | | | | | | | | | |

- Until 2001, the league was played in an autumn (A) and a spring (S) championship, with the autumn champion receiving the opportunity to play in the 2nd Rugby-Bundesliga South/West qualification round in spring.
- ^{1} Combined team of FSV Trier-Tarforst and DJK Andernach.
- ^{2} Combined team of RC Worms and a team from Speyer.
- ^{3} In 2006-07, RC Mainz took part in both the Regionalliga Hesse and Regionalliga Rhineland-Palatinate.
- ^{4} In 2005-06, the Regionalliga Hesse and Regionalliga Rhineland-Palatinate played as a joined league. SC 1880 Frankfurt II, Eintracht Frankfurt Rugby, RU Marburg, Blau-Gelb Darmstadt and URC Gießen 01 are clubs from Hesse.
- ^{5} In 2003-04, RC Worms took part in both the Regionalliga Hesse and Regionalliga Rhineland-Palatinate.
- ^{6} Combined team of the reserve team of RC Mainz and TuS Horrweiler.

=== Hesse ===
The league placings in the Regionalliga Hesse:

| Club | 00 | 01 | 02 | 03 | 04 | 05 | 06 | 07 | 08 | 09 | 10 | 11 | 12 | 13 | 14 | 15 | 16 |
| SC 1880 Frankfurt | ♦ | ♦ | ♦ | ♦ | ♦ | | ♦ | ♦ | ♦ | ♦ | ♦ | ♦ | ♦ | ♦ | ♦ | ♦ | ♦ |
| SC 1880 Frankfurt II | | | 3 | 7 | 4 | | 1 | ♦ | ♦ | ♦ | ♦ | ♦ | ♦ | ♦ | ♦ | ♦ | ♦ |
| RC Mainz ^{3} ^{4} | | | | ♦ | | | 2 | 1 | ♦ | ♦ | ♦ | ♦ | ♦ | ♦ | ♦ | ♦ | ♦ |
| Eintracht Frankfurt Rugby | | | 1 | 1 | 2 | | 4 | 5 | 4 | 2 | 1 | ♦ | ♦ | ♦ | ♦ | ♦ | ♦ |
| TGS Hausen | | | 5 | 5 | | | | | | | ♦ | | 2 | ♦ | ♦ | ♦ | ♦ |
| BSC Offenbach | ♦ | ♦ | ♦ | ♦ | ♦ | ♦ | ♦ | 3 | 3 | 3 | 2 | ♦ | 5 | 1 | ♦ | ♦ | ♦ |
| TG 75 Darmstadt | | | | | | | | | 7 | 5 | 3 | 2 | 3 | 2 | ♦ | ♦ | ♦ |
| SCW Göttingen | | | | | | | | | | | | | | | 3 | 1 | x |
| RK Heusenstamm II | | | w | 6 | | | | 4 | 1 | 1 | 4 | 1 | 1 | 3 | | 2 | x |
| URC Gießen 01 | | | 6 | 4 | 5 | | 7 | w | 5 | 4 | 6 | 4 | 6 | 4 | 1 | 3 | x |
| RU Marburg | | | 2 | 2 | 1 | | 3 | ♦ | 2 | | 5 | 6 | 4 | 5 | 2 | 4 | x |
| Rugby Cassel | | | | | | | | | | | | | | | 4 | 6 | x |
| RC Worms ^{4} ^{5} | | | | | 3 | | 8 | | | | | | | ♦ | ♦ | | x |
| SG Südhessen | | | | | | | | | | | | | | | | | x |
| SG BSC Offenbach/Eintracht Frankfurt | | | | | | | | | | | | | | | | 5 | |
| TSV Krofdorf-Gleiberg | | | | | | | | | | | | | | | 5 | | |
| TSV Krofdorf-Gleiberg | | | | | | | | | | | | | 8 | 6 | | | |
| SC 1880 Frankfurt III | | | | | | | | 6 | 6 | 6 | | 5 | 7 | | | | |
| SG Hausen/Babenhausen ^{8} | | | | | | | | | | | | 3 | | | | | |
| SG 80 III/Babenhausen ^{2} | | | | | | | | | | | 7 | | | | | | |
| SG Marburg/Babenhausen ^{1} | | | | | | | | | | w | | | | | | | |
| Blau-Gelb Darmstadt | | | | | | | 6 | 2 | | | | | | | | | |
| Ramstein Rogues RFC ^{4} | | | | | | | 5 | | | | | | | | | | |
| TGS Hausen/Heusenstamm II ^{6} | | | | | 6 | | | | | | | | | | | | |
| BSC Offenbach II/BG Darmstadt ^{7} | | | 4 | 3 | 7 | | | | | | | | | | | | |
| CRC Babenhausen | | | w | | | | | | | | | | | | | | |

- ^{1} Combined team of RU Marburg and CRC Babenhausen.
- ^{2} Combined team of the third team of SC 1880 Frankfurt and CRC Babenhausen.
- ^{3} In 2006-07, RC Mainz took part in both the Regionalliga Hesse and Regionalliga Rhineland-Palatinate.
- ^{4} In 2005-06, the Regionalliga Hesse and Regionalliga Rhineland-Palatinate played as a joined league. RC Mainz, RC Worms and the Ramstein Rogues RFC are clubs from Rhineland-Palatinate.
- ^{5} In 2003-04, RC Worms took part in both the Regionalliga Hesse and Regionalliga Rhineland-Palatinate.
- ^{6} Combined team of the reserve team of RK Heusenstamm and the TGS Hausen.
- ^{7} Combined team of the reserve team of BSC Offenbach and the Blau-Gelb Darmstadt.
- ^{8} Combined team of CRC Babenhausen and TGS Hausen.

=== Baden-Württemberg ===
The league placings in the Regionalliga Baden-Württemberg. The league has been defunct since the end of the 2011–12 season:

| Club | 01 | | 02 | 03 | 04 | 05 | 06 | 07 | 08 | 09 | 10 | 11 | 12 |
| Club | A | S | 02 | 03 | 04 | 05 | 06 | 07 | 08 | 09 | 10 | 11 | 12 |
| RG Heidelberg II | | | 3 | 2 | 1 | ♦ | ♦ | ♦ | ♦ | ♦ | ♦ | ♦ | ♦ |
| TSV Handschuhsheim II | | | 1 | 3 | 2 | | ♦ | ♦ | ♦ | ♦ | ♦ | ♦ | ♦ |
| Stuttgarter RC | | | 4 | 5 | 3 | | 2 | 1 | ♦ | ♦ | ♦ | ♦ | ♦ |
| Heidelberger RK II | | | | | | | | 2 | 1 | ♦ | ♦ | ♦ | ♦ |
| Heidelberger TV | ♦ | ♦ | ♦ | ♦ | ♦ | ♦ | ♦ | ♦ | ♦ | ♦ | 1 | ♦ | ♦ |
| TV Pforzheim | | | | | | | | | | 4 | 2 | ♦ | ♦ |
| Freiburger RC | | | 5 | 6 | | | 4 | 4 | 5 | 3 | 6 | 1 | ♦ |
| TSG Heilbronn | | | | | | | | 6 | 3 | 5 | 4 | 2 | ♦ |
| TV Pforzheim II | | | | | | | | | | | | 5 | 1 |
| Karlsruher SV Rugby | | | 6 | 4 | ♦ | ♦ | | | | 1 | ♦ | | 2 |
| RC Rottweil | | | 8 | 7 | 6 | | | | | 7 | 7 | 7 | 3 |
| Heidelberger TV II | | | | | | | | | | | | 6 | 4 |
| RC Konstanz | | | 7 | 8 | | | 3 | | | | 3 | 4 | 5 |
| Stuttgarter RC II | | | | | | | | | | 6 | 8 | 8 | 6 |
| TSB Ravensburg | | | | | | | | | | | | 9 | 7 |
| SC Neuenheim II | | | | | | | 5 | | w | | 5 | 3 | |
| SG Konstanz/TSB Ravensburg ^{1} | | | | | | | | 3 | 2 | 2 | | | |
| SG Rottweil/Stuttgart ^{2} | | | | | | | | | 4 | | | | |
| SG HTV/KSV/TVP ^{3} | | | | | | | | 5 | 7 | | | | |
| SG Karlsruhe/Pforzheim ^{4} | | | | | | | 1 | | | | | | |
| SC Neuenheim II/TV Pforzheim ^{5} | | | 2 | 1 | 4 | | | | | | | | |
| Karlsruher SV Rugby II | | | | | 5 | | | | | | | | |

- Until 2001, the league was played in an autumn (A) and a spring (S) championship, with the autumn champion receiving the opportunity to play in the 2nd Rugby-Bundesliga South/West qualification round in spring. No competition has been held since 2012.
- ^{1} Combined team of RC Konstanz and TSB Ravensburg.
- ^{2} Combined team of RC Rottweil and the reserve team of Stuttgarter RC.
- ^{3} Combined team of Karlsruher SV Rugby, TV Pforzheim and the reserve team of Heidelberger TV.
- ^{4} Combined team of Karlsruher SV Rugby and TV Pforzheim.
- ^{5} Combined team of the reserve team of SC Neuenheim and TV Pforzheim.

=== Bavaria ===
The league placings in the Regionalliga Bavaria, which was formed shortley after the Bavarian Rugby Federation in 1996:

| Club | 01 | | 02 | 03 | 04 | 05 | 06 | 07 | 08 | 09 | 10 | 11 | 12 | 13 | 14 | 15 | 16 | 17 |
| Club | A | S | 02 | 03 | 04 | 05 | 06 | 07 | 08 | 09 | 10 | 11 | 12 | 13 | 14 | 15 | 16 | 17 |
| StuSta München | 5 | 2 | 1 | 2 | 1 | ♦ | ♦ | ♦ | ♦ | ♦ | ♦ | ♦ | ♦ | ♦ | ♦ | ♦ | ♦ | ♦ |
| RC Regensburg | | 4 | 3 | 5 | 6 | 2 | 5 | 3 | 2 | 1 | 3 | 1 | 2 | 2 | 3 | 1 | ♦ | ♦ |
| RFC Bad Reichenhall | | | | | | | | | | | 4 | 2 | 1 | 1 | 2 | 2 | 5 | 7 |
| Augsburg RFC | | | | | | | | | | | 2 | 3 | 6 | 4 | 1 | 3 | 4 | 5 |
| TSV 1846 Nürnberg | 2 | ♦ | 2 | 1 | 2 | 1 | 1 | 2 | 1 | 2 | 1 | ♦ | ♦ | ♦ | ♦ | 4 | 3 | 1 |
| Würzburger RK 2012 | | | | | | | | | | | | | | | 7 | 5 | 6 | 3 |
| RC Unterföhring | | | | | | | | | | | | | | 7 | 6 | 6 | 2 | 2 |
| StuSta München II | | | | | | 6 | 6 | | | | 5 | 7 | 3 | 6 | 4 | 7 | 7 | 6 |
| München RFC II | 1 | 1 | 4 | 3 | 4 | 5 | 4 | 5 | 4 | 4 | 7 | 4 | 5 | 3 | 5 | 8 | 1 | 4 |
| Allgäu Rugby Kempten | | | | | | | | | | | | | | | | | 8 | |
| TV Memmingen | | | | | | | | | | | | 6 | 4 | 5 | 8 | | | |
| Vilseck RC | | | | | | | | 6 | | | | | | w | | | | w |
| Illesheim RFC | 3 | 3 | 6 | w | 3 | 3 | 2 | 4 | | 3 | | 5 | | | | | | |
| Vilsenwöhr RC | | | | | | | | | | | | w | | | | | | |
| VfB Ulm | | | | | | | 3 | 1 | 3 | 5 | 8 | | | | | | | |
| TV 1861 Ingolstadt | | | | | | | | | | | 6 | | | | | | | |
| Neu-Ulm RFC | | | | 4 | 5 | 4 | | | | | | | | | | | | |
| SG Ingolstadt/Rosenheim | | | | | | 7 | | | | | | | | | | | | |
| Schweinfurt RFC | 6 | 8 | 5 | | | | | | | | | | | | | | | |
| TuS Fürstenfeldbruck | 4 | 5 | | | | | | | | | | | | | | | | |
| RFC Würzburg | 7 | 6 | | | | | | | | | | | | | | | | |
| TSV Bamberg | | 7 | | | | | | | | | | | | | | | | |
| SG Augsburg/Neu Ulm | 8 | | | | | | | | | | | | | | | | | |

- Until 2001, the league was played in an autumn (A) and a spring (S) championship, with the autumn champion receiving the opportunity to play in the 2nd Rugby-Bundesliga South/West qualification round in spring. As the 2000 autumn champions, München RFC II, was ineligible to compete in the 2nd Bundesliga, being a reserves team, the second placed team, TSV 1846 Nürnberg, went instead. 2015/16 München RFC II, was ineligible to compete in the 2nd Bundesliga, Unterföhring lost the promotion play-off against Karlsruher SV. In 2016/17 Nürnberg declined the promotion to the 2nd Bundesliga, so Unterföhring stepped in.

=== Key ===
| ♦ = Team played in Rugby-Bundesliga, 2nd Rugby-Bundesliga or 3rd Liga South/West | 1 = League champion | North/East championship round | w = Team withdrawn | x = Current seasons teams |

== See also ==
- Rugby union in Germany
- German rugby union cup
