= Hamburger SV Rugby =

German rugby union club, based in Hamburg

(Germany) Hamburger SV Rugby
- Full name: Hamburger Sport-Verein e. V.
- Union: German Rugby Federation
- Founded: 29 September 1887; 138 years ago (Club); 1925 (Rugby department)
- Location: Hamburg, Germany
- Ground: Rugbystadion Saarlandstraße 71, 22303 Hamburg
- Chairman: Falk Tiede
- Coach: Paul Andrew Mc Guigan
- Captain: Lorenz Fricke
- League: Rugby Regionalliga Nord
Team kit

Official website
- hsvrugby.jimdo.com

The Hamburger SV Rugby is a German rugby union club from Hamburg, currently competing in the Rugby-Regionalliga Nord, the third tier of rugby in Germany. The team is part of a larger club, the Hamburger SV, which also offers other sports like association football, baseball and cricket.

== History ==
The HSV's Rugby department was founded on 16 October 1925 by track and field athletes of the club and external rugby players.

For the most part it has been stuck in the shadow of its local rival FC St. Pauli Rugby. However, over the years HSV managed to win the Hamburg championships twice: once in 1938 and another 40 years later in 1978. This feat earned the team a brief spell in the Rugby-Bundesliga, the highest division of the sport in Germany.

In the 1990s, the club closed its rugby department because of a lack of members. In March 2006, the department was reestablished and a first team formed, consisting mainly (90%) of players who had not played rugby before.

In 2008 the team had to withdraw from the Regionalliga and was demoted to the Verbandsliga due to a lack of players. During the following years the team focused more on restructuring and less on results resulting in occasional victories and a successful campaign, which saw the team finish second in the Verbandsliga Nord in 2012/2013.

In the last season 2017 the HSV-Rugby won the Championship in the Verbandsliga Nord. HSV-Rugby run up to the third Division. Now they play in the Regionalliga Nord.

== Current Season ==
The team is currently continuing its revival and is permanently looking for new players, although the HSV Rugby team now counts more than 40 active members and players from several countries. In the last season 2017 the HSV-Rugby won the Championship in the Verbandsliga Nord. HSV-Rugby run up to the third Division. Now they play in the Regionalliga Nord. p

== Club Honours ==
- Hamburg championship
  - Champions: 1938, 1978
  - Verbandsliga Nord Champion 2017

== Recent seasons ==
Recent seasons of the club:

Year	Division	Position
2006–07	Rugby-Regionalliga North (III)	8th
2007–08	Rugby-Verbandsliga Nord (IV)	5th
2008–09	Rugby-Verbandsliga Nord	7th
2009–10	Rugby-Verbandsliga Nord	4th
2010–11	Rugby-Verbandsliga Hamburg	4th
2011–12	Rugby-Verbandsliga Nord	6th
2012–13	Rugby-Verbandsliga Nord	2nd
2013–14	Rugby-Verbandsliga Nord	5th
2014-15	Rugby-Verbandsliga Nord	
2015-16	Rugby-Verbandsliga Nord	7th
2016-17	Rugby-Verbandsliga Nord	1st
2017-18	Rugby-Regionalliga Nord	
