= VfR Döhren =

German rugby union club, based in Hanover

(Germany) VfR Döhren
- Full name: Verein für Rasenspiele 1906 e.V
- Union: German Rugby Federation
- Founded: 1906; 120 years ago
- Location: Hanover, Germany
- Coach: Jens Himmer
- League: 2. Rugby-Bundesliga (II)
- 2015–16: 2. Rugby-Bundesliga North, 4th

Official website
- www.vfr06.de

The VfR Döhren is a German rugby union club from Hanover, playing in the Regionalliga North, the third tier of rugby in Germany. It plays in partnership with SV Odin Hannover, as SG SV Odin/VfR Döhren.

The club has three German rugby union championship to its name, won in 1933, 1934 and 1959.

== History ==
The club was founded on 13 May 1906. At that time the club's name was "Sportverein Strauss Döhren" including a reference to the village of Döhren in the outskirts of Hanover, Germany. In 1912 the club could buy its first own ground. During the 1st World War no rugby was played and 24 club members died in action. In February 1919 the club was reinstalled and renamed to 'Verein für Rasenspiele e.V. Hannover-Döhren'. For a few months during 1919 association football was played during a cooperation with the football club "Favorit Wülfel". In order to enable self-supply with groceries the club's ground had been converted into allotment gardens. After compensation of the gardeners the ground was reclaimed in 1920. The next decade was characterised by continuous growth, especially in the junior section. In 1929 the expansion ideas led to the introduction of a women's gymnastic section. By 1930 men and women were also playing fistball in the club.

During the Second World War club actives were going on until 1943, when as an effect of the strategic bombing of Hannover the club's pitch was destroyed. In December 1945 Allied Control Council issued the "Directive 23-Limitation and Demilitarization of Sport in Germany" which led to the termination of all German sports clubs. In Döhren only one club was allowed afterwards which served as the governing body for all sport activities. All three Döhren-based rugby clubs (FC Schwalbe Hannover, 06 Döhren, VfR Döhren) had to join. Due to relaxation of the policies on sport activities in 1947 FC Schwalbe became an independent club again. In the same year VfR Döhren and 06 Döhren merged and the still valid name "Verein für Rasenspiele 1906" was created.

Döhren's first national title came in 1933, when it beat RG Heidelberg 3–0. The following year, 1934, it repeated its success, this time beating fellow Hanover club FV 1897 Linden 8–3.

The club did not play in another national final after that for the next 25 years. In 1959, once more against RG Heidelberg, VfR won its third national championship with a 10–5 victory. It made one more finals appearance in 1965, this time in the German rugby union cup, where it lost to TSV Victoria Linden.

Starting with the celebration of the 50th anniversary in 1956, the club established a tight friendship with the DHfK Leipzig. In the same year a first trip to Leipzig was organised, followed by two mutual visits each year. In 1960 the match scheduled in Hannover happened to be an encounter of the officiating national champions VfR (Federal Republic of Germany in 1959) and DHfK Leipzig (champion of the German Democratic Republic in 1958, no championship title battled in 1959). VfR started advertising this match as a pan-German championship but had to paste over the words DDR-Meister by order of the DRV.

In recent seasons, the club has not been as successful. It formed a partnership with FC Schwalbe Hannover for some time in the late 1990s and the two clubs fielded a combined team. The side played in the Rugby-Bundesliga once more from 1999 but was relegated with the restructuring of the league in 2001. VfR fielded its own, independent side again, now in the 2nd Rugby-Bundesliga North/East, where it lasted until 2005 before being relegated to the tier-three Rugby-Regionalliga Lower Saxony, where it earned promotion from in 2007.

In 2007 however, instead of playing in the 2nd Bundesliga, it was forced to form a partnership again, now with SV Odin Hannover, as SG SV Odin/VfR Döhren. In its first season, 2007–08, VfR teamed up with Odin's second team in the Regionalliga but since then, the two clubs field a combined side in both the first and second team. The first team of this partnership plays its home games in the 2nd Rugby-Bundesliga at Odin, while the reserve side in the Regionalliga plays at VfR. Despite their struggling senior section the club revitalised the junior section after the millennium. The efforts in these area were more successful and led to two consecutive national junior championship titles in the under 10 age group in 2008 and 2009.

The SG SV Odin/VfR Döhren was withdrawn from the 2nd Bundesliga in 2011 and instead entered the tier-three Regionalliga North for the following season. n the 2014–15 season the club finished third in the north-east Liga-Pokal group and was knocked out by Neckarsulmer SU in the quarter-finals of the play-offs.

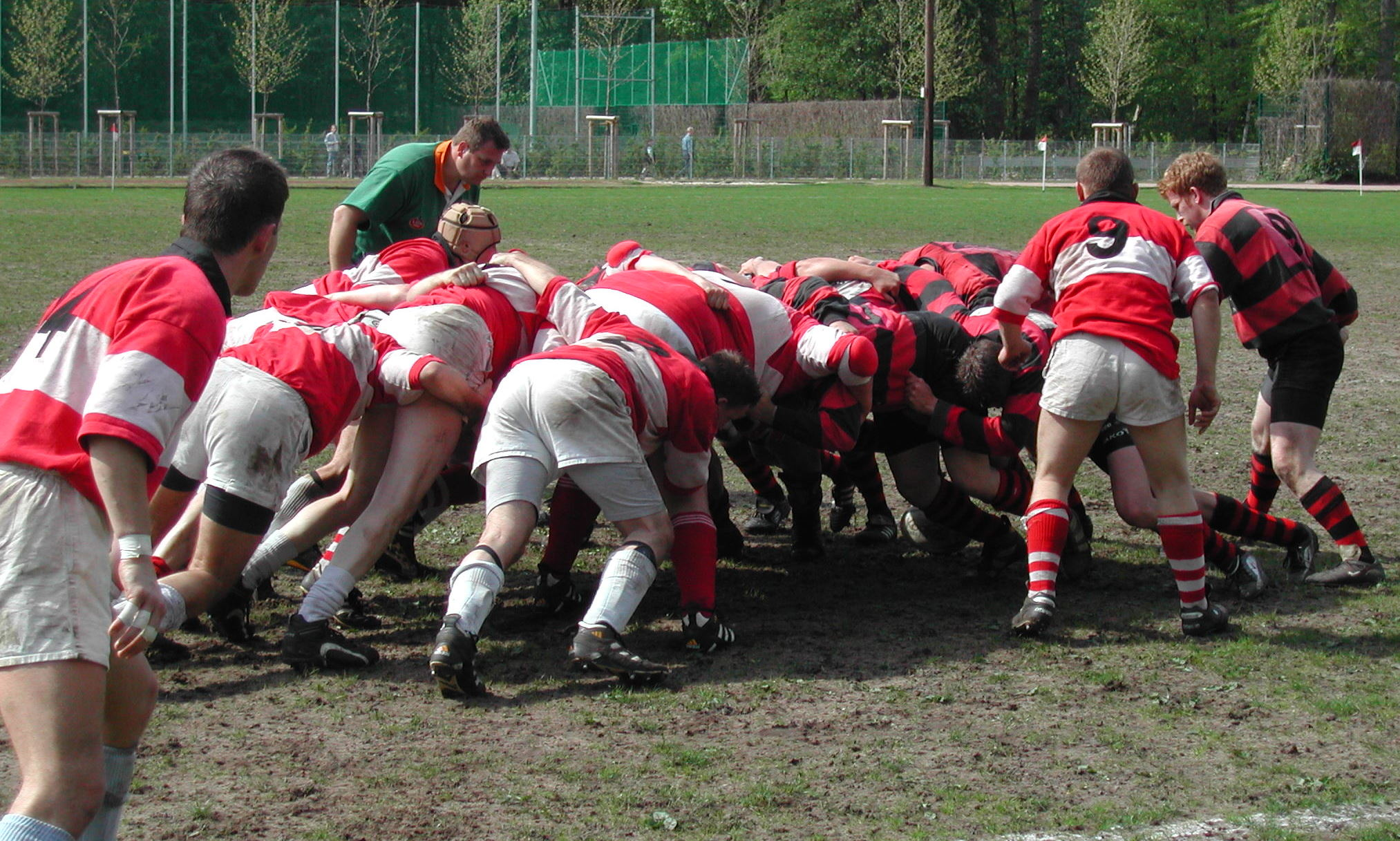
Srcum during a game VfR (red/white) vs HRC

== Club honours ==
- German rugby union championship
  - Champions: 1933, 1934, 1959
- German rugby union cup
  - Runners up: 1965
- German rugby union junior cup
  - Champions: 1985, 2009

== Recent seasons ==
Recent seasons of the club:

Year	Division	Position
1997–98	2nd Rugby-Bundesliga North/East (II)	3rd
1998–99	2nd Rugby-Bundesliga North/East	4th
1998–99	Bundesliga qualification round	3rd — Promoted
1999–2000	Rugby-Bundesliga North/East (I)	6th
1999–2000	Bundesliga qualification round	5th
2000–01	Rugby-Bundesliga North/East	6th
2000–01	Bundesliga qualification round	11th — Relegated
2001–02	2nd Rugby-Bundesliga North/East (II)	7th
2002–03	2nd Rugby-Bundesliga North/East	5th
2003–04	2nd Rugby-Bundesliga North/East	2nd
2004–05	2nd Rugby-Bundesliga North/East	7th — Relegated
2005–06	Rugby-Regionalliga Lower Saxony (III)	
2005–06	North/East championship round	4th
2006–07	Rugby-Regionalliga Lower Saxony (III)	3rd
2006–07	North/East championship round	1st
2007–08	Rugby-Regionalliga Lower Saxony (autumn)	3rd
2007–08	Rugby-Regionalliga Lower Saxony (spring)	2nd
2008–09	2nd Rugby-Bundesliga North/East	5th
2009–10	2nd Rugby-Bundesliga North/East	5th
2010–11	2nd Rugby-Bundesliga North/East	6th — Relegated
2011–12	Rugby-Regionalliga North	8th
2012–13	Rugby-Regionalliga North	3rd
2013–14	Rugby-Regionalliga North	1st — Promoted
2014–15	2nd Rugby-Bundesliga qualification round – North	3rd
2014–15	Liga-Pokal – North-East	1st — Quarter finals
2015–16	2nd Rugby-Bundesliga North	4th

- Until 2001, when the single-division Bundesliga was established, the season was divided in autumn and spring, a Vorrunde and Endrunde, whereby the top teams of the Rugby-Bundesliga would play out the championship while the bottom teams together with the autumn 2nd Bundesliga champion would play for Bundesliga qualification. The remainder of the 2nd Bundesliga teams would play a spring round to determine the relegated clubs. Where two placing's are shown, the first is autumn, the second spring.
- Since 2007, the club competes in partnership with SV Odin Hannover as SG SV Odin/VfR Döhren.

The season 2011/12 will see the SG SV Odin/VfR Döhren playing in the Rugby-Regionalliga North. Despite being eligible for playing another season the 2nd Rugby-Bundesliga North/East the clubs decided to ask for relegation.
