= 3. Liga Süd-West =

German rugby union league

- Sport: Rugby union
- Founded: 2010
- No. of teams: 9
- Country: Germany
- Most recent champion: Freiburg Rugby Club

The 3. Liga Süd-West (English: 3rd League South/West) is the third-highest level of Germany's Rugby union league system, organised by the German Rugby Federation. It is set below the 2nd Rugby-Bundesliga South/West, the second tier of rugby in Southern Germany, and above the Rugby-Regionalliga, the fourth tier.

The league covers the federal states of Bavaria, Baden-Württemberg, Hesse, Rhineland-Palatinate and North Rhine-Westphalia. However, clubs from the Saarland and Luxembourg are also entitled to play in this league in the future.

== History ==
The league was formed after the 2009-10 season, with the purpose of creating a more competitive level of play for the rugby clubs in Southern Germany above the Regionalligas. The suggestion, made by the Rhineland-Palatinate rugby federation in May 2010, was to form a new league, the Oberliga-Süd-West. On 26 June 2010, the formation of this new league was decided upon in a meeting of the five Southern German rugby federations, and the new league was named 3. Liga Süd/West.

Previously, clubs that were relegated from the 2nd Rugby-Bundesliga South/West dropped straight into one of the five Regionalligas below the league, which, because of the regionalisation of these leagues, were considerably less competitive. Championship-winning clubs in the Regionalliga were often too strong for this level but too weak for the level above. In order to bridge the gap between the second and third tier and increase the standard of play at this level, the new league was formed. Northern Germany, below the 2nd Rugby-Bundesliga North/East, formed no such league and the three Regionalligas there remain as the third tier of play.

The new league was formed from nine clubs. One was the RC Mainz, which was relegated from the 2nd Bundesliga at the end of the 2009-10 season, while, of the other eight, one came from the Regionalliga Bavaria, two from Hesse, one from Rhineland-Palatinate, one from Baden-Württemberg and three from North Rhine-Westphalia. The two top teams in the league will be promoted to the 2nd Rugby-Bundesliga South/West at the end of the 2010-11 season.

For the 2011-12 season, the league was scheduled to be expanded to at least twelve teams in two regional divisions, but started play with eleven clubs instead. After the first round, the reserve team of RG Heidelberg joined the competition, thereby equaling both divisions in the number of clubs to six.

In 2012-13 the league once more started out with eleven teams but two of those were removed from competition after missing fixtures, Grashof RC Essen and SC Neuenheim II.

The 2013–14 season was played with ten teams in two divisions of five but RG Heidelberg II was expelled from the competition after failing to field in two season games.

The 2014–15 season was played in a single division league of ten teams.

== Honours ==
The league honours:

=== The league champions and runners-up ===
| Season | Champions | Runners-up |
|---|---|---|
| 2010–11 | **Heidelberger TV** | **RC Mainz** |
| 2011–12 | **Ramstein Rogues RFC** | **TuS 95 Düsseldorf** |
| 2012–13 | **TSV Handschuhsheim II** | **RC Rottweil** |
| 2013–14 | **RC Luxembourg** | **TGS Hausen** |
| 2014–15 | **TG 75 Darmstadt** | Heidelberger RK II |
| 2015–16 | RG Heidelberg II | Karlsruher SV |

- Promoted teams in **bold**.

=== Divisional champions ===
From 2011 to 2014 the league was played in two regional divisions which were won by the following teams:

| Season | North | South |
|---|---|---|
| 2011–12 | Ramstein Rogues RFC | StuSta München |
| 2012–13 | TSV Handschuhsheim II | RC Rottweil |
| 2013–14 | RC Luxembourg | TG 75 Darmstadt |
