= RC Unterföhring =

German rugby union club, based in Unterföhring, Munich

(Germany) Rugby Club Unterföhring
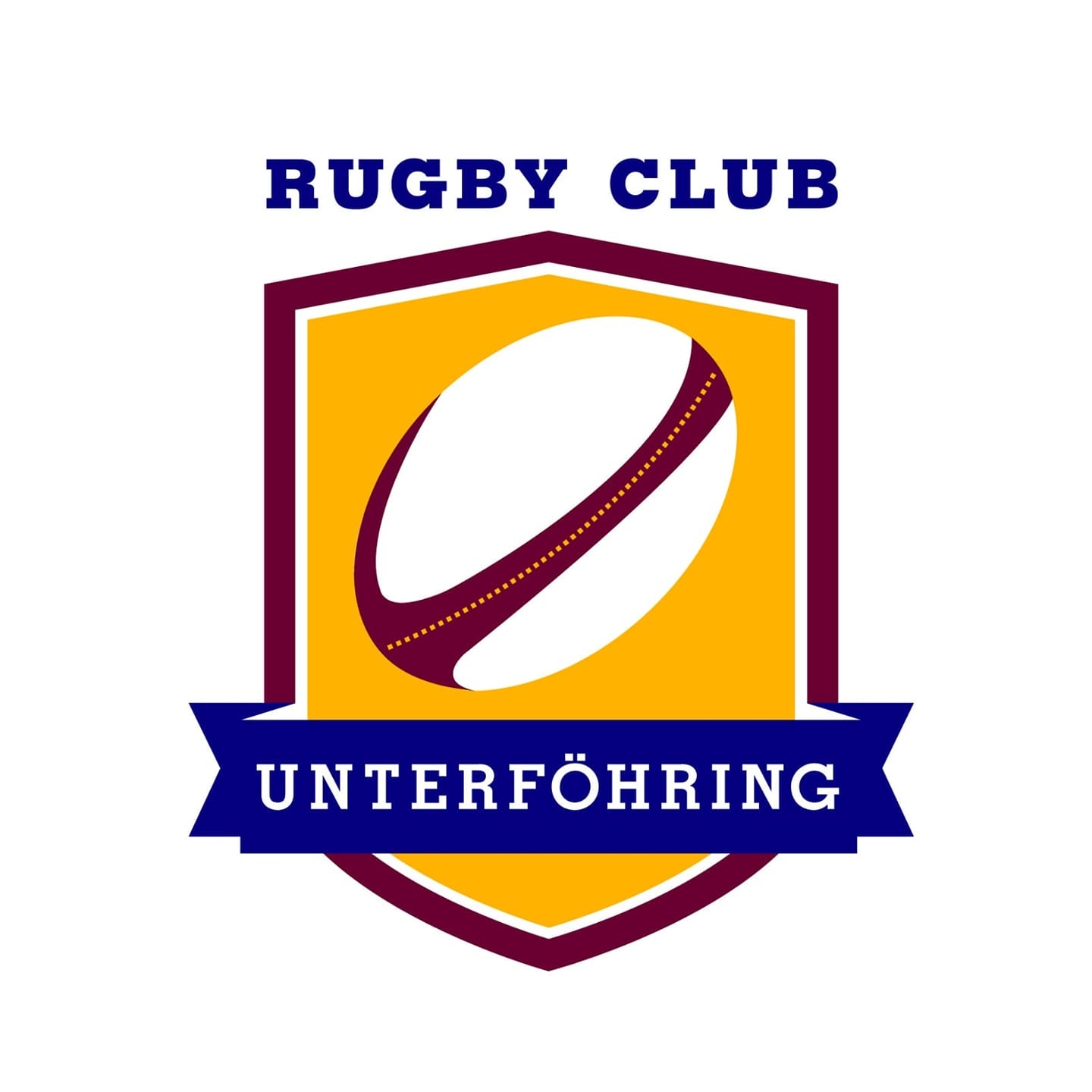
- Full name: Rugby Club Unterföhring e.V.
- Union: German Rugby Federation
- Founded: 21 June 2012; 13 years ago
- Location: Unterföhring, Germany
- Ground: RC Unterföhring Rugby Park
- Chairman: (Germany) Steve Kotza
- Coach: (New Zealand) Logan Mokalei
- Captain: (Germany) Linus Kurz
- League: 2. Rugby-Bundesliga
- 2024-2025: 5th

Official website
- www.rugby-unterfoehring.de

The Rugby Club Unterföhring is a German rugby union club from Munich district, currently playing in the 2nd Rugby-Bundesliga and with a second team in the Verbandsliga Bayern. It is based in Unterföhring, the closest suburb to Munich city centre. Since January 2017 the RCU is the second biggest rugby club in Bavaria with 240 members.

Also Unterföhring was the smallest municipality in Germany with its own rugby union club from 2012 until 2016. After the promotion to the 2. Bundesliga in 2016/17 Unterföhring is the only village (German: Gemeinde) in the history of German rugby to have ever played in a Bundesliga. All other clubs where always based in towns or cities (German: Stadt) or army bases.

The RCU also has a growing youth section and the club is the fourth biggest club with kids under 14 years old in all of Germany. The RCU has secured championships in the Under 8, Under 10 and Under 12 age groups in recent years, as well as runners-up in U8, U10, U12 and U14. The RCU youth teams are known for consistently being able to field complete sides in the Bavarian youth competition.

Founded in 2016 the RCU also has a women's team playing in the Deutsche 7er-Liga Frauen Süd. For the season 2022/23 the aim of the first Men's team was to achieve a ranking in the top 3 at the end of the 2. Bundesliga season. They had success and reached 2nd place at the end of the season and qualified for the promotion match for 1st Bundesliga South/West against RSV Köln in Cologne which RCU lost.

== Youth summer camps ==
In summer 2022 former All Black Kane Hames held a summer camp in Unterföhring with 25 junior players attending. On February 23, 2023, the club announced that they will hold again a summer camp for youth players from age 7 to age 17 in Unterföhring. This time Robert Mohr, former player and current Director of Rugby at Stade Rochalais and former German Rugby International visited Unterföhring and conducted two out of four days at the training camp from July 31 to August 4 in Unterföhring.

== Facilities ==
The RCU plays their home games on the rugby pitch in Unterföhring am Etzweg.

== Honours ==
Seniors:

- Bavarian rugby union championship
  - Runners-up: 2016, 2017
- Promotion to 2nd Bundesliga
  - 2017
- Quarter Finals Liga Pokal
  - 2018
- Runners up 2nd Bundesliga
  - 2023 (most successful season so far)
- Bavarian rugby union 7s championship
  - Champions 2025

Youth

- Bavarian rugby union championship
  - Champions: Under-8: 2017, 2018, 2019; Under-10: 2017, 2018; Under-12: 2019
    - Runners-up: Under-8: 2016; Under-10: 2015, 2016; Under-12: 2018; Under-14 2019

== Recent seasons ==
=== Men ===
==== First team ====
Year	Division	Position
2012-13	Rugby-Regionalliga Bavaria (IV)	7th
2013-14	Rugby-Regionalliga Bavaria (IV)	6th
2014-15	Rugby-Regionalliga Bavaria (III)	6th
2015–16	Rugby-Regionalliga Bavaria	2nd
2016 playoff	2nd Rugby-Bundesliga South	lost
2016–17	Rugby-Regionalliga Bavaria	2nd promoted
2017-18	2nd Rugby-Bundesliga South	5th
2018-19	2nd Rugby-Bundesliga South	5th
2019-20	2nd Rugby-Bundesliga South	cancelled due to COVID-19-outbreak
2020-21	2nd Rugby-Bundesliga South	cancelled due to COVID-19-outbreak
2021-22	2nd Rugby-Bundesliga South	5th
2022-23	2nd Rugby-Bundesliga South	2nd (best season so far)
2022-23	2nd Rugby-Bundesliga South	3rd
2024-25	2nd Rugby-Bundesliga South	5th

==== Reserve team ====
Year	Division	Position
2012-13	Rugby-Verbandsliga Bavaria (V)	4th
2013-14	Rugby-Verbandsliga Bavaria (V)	6th
2016-17	Rugby-Verbandsliga Bavaria North (IV)	3rd
2017-18	Rugby-Verbandsliga Bavaria South (IV)	4th
2018-19	Rugby-Verbandsliga Bavaria (IV)	8th
2019-20	Rugby-Verbandsliga Bavaria (IV)	cancelled due to COVID-19 outbreak
2020-21	Rugby-Verbandsliga Bavaria (IV)	cancelled due to COVID-19 outbreak
2022-23	Rugby-Verbandsliga South Bavaria (IV)	3rd

==== Women ====
Year	Division	Position
2017 - 2018	Rugby-7s Division South (I)	10th
2018 - 2019	Rugby-7s Division South (I)	4th
