= StuSta München =

German rugby union club, based in Munich

(Germany) SV Studentenstadt Freimann
- Full name: SV Studentenstadt Freimann e.V.
- Union: German Rugby Federation
- Location: Munich, Germany
- Chairman: Schorsch
- League: 2. Rugby-Bundesliga (II)
- 2015–16: 2. Rugby-Bundesliga South, 2nd
Team kit

Official website
- www.stusta-rugby.de

The SV Studentenstadt Freimann is a German rugby union club from Munich, currently playing in the 2nd Rugby-Bundesliga. It is based in the Studentenstadt in Munich, the student city.

The club is part of a larger student club, the SportVerein der Studentenstadt Freimann e.V, which offers other sports like association football, tennis and volleyball. Its nickname is StuSta Rugby.

== History ==
A club largely made up of German and international students, StuSta took out its first Bavarian rugby union championship in 2002, winning the Regionalliga Bayern, repeating this success in 2004.

Following this success, the club earned promotion to the 2nd Rugby-Bundesliga South/West in 2004, the second tier of German rugby. After struggling against relegation for the first three seasons there, the team has established itself as a mid-table side.

In this league, it competes with local rival München RFC, a former Rugby-Bundesliga club. It took StuSta until May 2008 however, to win a game against the other Munich club.

The club suffered relegation at the end of the 2010–11 season and had to drop down to the 3rd Liga South/West for the following year. The team won the southern division of the league but was knocked out in the semi-finals and initially missed out on promotion. However, a league expansion saw the club return to the 2nd Bundesliga for 2012–13. In the 2012–13 season, in the 2nd Bundesliga, the club finished in the upper half of the table and qualified for the play-offs for the DRV-Pokal. The club advanced to the semi-finals of the play-offs after victory over RC Leipzig but forfeited its game there, with opposition TSV Handschuhsheim thereby automatically advancing to the final.

The club qualified for the south-west division of the Liga-Pokal in 2013–14 and received a bye for the first round of the play-offs after winning its division and advanced to the final against Neckarsulmer SU where it lost 10–15. In the 2014–15 season the club finished fifth in the south-west group of the DRV-Pokal and was knocked out by Heidelberger TV in the quarter-finals of the play-offs after a first round victory over TSV Victoria Linden.

The second team plays in the now fourth tier Regionalliga Bayern, and the newly founded women's team plays in the second tier Regionalliga South/West.

== Honours ==
- German league cup
  - Runners-up: 2014
- Bavarian rugby union championship
  - Champions: 2002, 2004
  - Runners-up: 2003

== Recent seasons ==
Recent seasons of the club:

Year	Division	Position
2001-02	Rugby-Regionalliga Bavaria (III)	1st
2002-03	Rugby-Regionalliga Bavaria	2nd
2003-04	Rugby-Regionalliga Bavaria	1st — Promoted
2004-05	2nd Rugby-Bundesliga South/West (II)	8th
2005-06	2nd Rugby-Bundesliga South/West	8th
2006–07	2nd Rugby-Bundesliga South/West	9th
2007–08	2nd Rugby-Bundesliga South/West	6th
2008–09	2nd Rugby-Bundesliga South/West	6th
2009–10	2nd Rugby-Bundesliga South/West	6th
2010–11	2nd Rugby-Bundesliga South/West	10th — Relegated
2011–12	3rd Liga South/West (III)	1st — Semi finals
2012–13	2nd Rugby-Bundesliga qualification round – South	1st
2012–13	DRV-Pokal – South-West	3rd — Semi finals
2013–14	2nd Rugby-Bundesliga qualification round – South	3rd
2013–14	Liga-Pokal – South-West	1st — Runners up
2014–15	2nd Rugby-Bundesliga qualification round – South	2nd
2014–15	DRV-Pokal – South-West	5th — Quarter finals
2015–16	2nd Rugby-Bundesliga South	2nd

- Until 2001, when the single-division Bundesliga was established, the season was divided in autumn and spring, a Vorrunde and Endrunde, whereby the top teams of the Rugby-Bundesliga would play out the championship while the bottom teams together with the autumn 2nd Bundesliga champion would play for Bundesliga qualification. The remainder of the 2nd Bundesliga teams would play a spring round to determine the relegated clubs. Where two placings are shown, the first is autumn, the second spring. In 2012 the Bundesliga was expanded from ten to 24 teams and the 2nd Bundesliga from 20 to 24 with the leagues divided into four regional divisions.
