= München RFC =

German rugby union club, based in Munich

(Germany) München Rugby Football Club e.V.
- Full name: München Rugby Football Club e.V.
- Union: German Rugby Federation
- Founded: 1977
- Location: Munich, Germany
- Ground(s): Bezirkssportanlage, Ludwig-Hunger-Strasse 11, 81375 München
- Chairman: (Germany) Götz Köthe
- Coach: (Republic of Ireland) Alan Moughty (Republic of Ireland) Aidan Doyle (England) Scott Warner
- Captain: (Germany) Niklas Hohl
- League: 1. Rugby-Bundesliga
- 2023–24: 1. Rugby-Bundesliga South, 4th
Team kit

Official website
- www.munich-rugby.de

The München RFC is a German rugby union club from Munich, currently playing in the 2nd Rugby-Bundesliga.

== History ==
While rugby had been played in Munich and Bavaria before the inception of the MRFC in 1977, four clubs existed in the city in the 1920s and 1930s, the club's game on 10 June 1978 was the first proper game of rugby played in the city of Munich in almost 50 years.

Rugby had been in hibernation in Bavaria since the days of the Nazis and when US soldiers in the garrison of Augsburg formed a team in 1974, it was the first post-war rugby club to be formed in Bavaria. After a number of other military teams were formed in the following years, MRFC became the first civilian club to be formed in the state in 1977, by British expats, mostly from Wales. The club was formed in a pub in the Isarvorstadt and played its first game that autumn.

The first game it played in Munich, in June 1978, was against the Bad Tölz US Army and it took another year to play its first German opponent, RC Rottweil, on 30 June 1979. Not until 1985 was a second non-military team established in Bavaria, the rugby department of TuS Fürstenfeldbruck.

The club was officially registered in 1982 and in July 1983 attained incorporated status (German: e.V.). However, it could not obtain a regular home ground in Munich and had to play its matches in Fürstenfeldbruck.

Due to Bavaria neither having a league nor a rugby federation in those days, the club had to join the Regionalliga in neighbouring Baden-Württemberg in 1984.

In 1990, the club's long term coach, Rory Donoghue, signed up and a generation change was carried out within it. A quick result of this was the winning of the South German Championship in 1991.

MRFC finally obtained a home ground within Munich, Am Hedernfeld and was promoted to the 2nd Bundesliga South in 1992, where it only lasted for one season.

After two seasons back in tier three, the club once more won promotion to the second division in 1995. A year later, the club became one of the founding members of the Bavarian Rugby Federation, the RVBY.

In 1998, the club celebrated promotion to the Rugby-Bundesliga for the first time, only to be denied a licence and having to stay in division two.

In 2000, the MRFC finally reached the top-tier of German rugby through a third place in the Bundesliga qualification round. Its first season in the new league was reasonably successful and any other year, a second place in the spring qualification round would have been enough to hold on to its league place but a restructuring of the German league system, but the move from two to a single division Bundesliga meant, RFC had to return to the 2nd Bundesliga.

MRFC won the championship in the 2nd Bundesliga in 2002, won against North/East champion Post SV Berlin, meant promotion back to the elite league.

Again, the stay in the Bundesliga lasted for only one season and the team was relegated back down immediately, without a win and 14 losses.

Since then, the club has been playing in the 2nd Bundesliga South/East as a mid-table side. In 2004, it was joined there by local rival StuSta München. Another promotion to the Bundesliga was not in sight in 2008-09 either, with the team coming fourth in the league once more.

In the 2012-13 season the club competed in the 2nd Bundesliga, finishing in the upper half of the table and qualifying for the play-offs for the DRV-Pokal. The club advanced to the semi-finals of the play-offs where it was knocked out by Heidelberger TV.

The club once more qualified for the play-offs to the DRV-Pokal in 2013–14, where it was knocked out by USV Potsdam Rugby in the first round. In the 2014–15 season the club finished first in the south-west Liga-Pokal group and lost to the reserve team of TSV Handschuhsheim n the final after a first round bye and victories over RC Dresden and TuS 95 Düsseldorf.

The 2015-16 Season was the most successful Season in the club's history. Munich RFC won both the 2nd Bundesliga South and the Bavarian Regionalliga for the first time in the club's history. The first team went on to the Play Off Final to decide whether they would gain promotion to the highest level in German Rugby. MRFC lost to Luxembourg Rugby Club in a very close final 12-9.

In 2017 the Club moved from the old training facility in Giesing to a new state of the art 4G training pitch in Großhadern. Directly next to the match day home ground (see Home Ground). In the same year Munich RFC celebrated the 40th Anniversary of the club.

Since 2002, the club also has a women's team and with Yvonne Schwarzkopf its first German international.

== Club honours ==
- 2nd Rugby-Bundesliga
  - Champions: 2002, 2016, 2022
- 2nd Rugby-Bundesliga South/West
  - Champions: 2002, 2016, 2022
  - Runners-up: 2010
- Bayern Regionalliga
  - Champions: 2016, 2022

== Recent seasons ==
Recent seasons of the club:

=== Men ===
==== First team ====
Year	Division	Position
1998-99	2nd Rugby-Bundesliga South/West (II)	
1998-99	Bundesliga qualification round	4th
1999-2000	2nd Rugby-Bundesliga South/West	3rd
1999-2000	Bundesliga qualification round	3rd — Promoted
2000-01	Rugby-Bundesliga South/West (I)	4th
2000-01	Bundesliga qualification round	2nd — Relegated
2001-02	2nd Rugby-Bundesliga South/West (II)	1st — Promoted
2002-03	Rugby-Bundesliga (I)	8th — Relegated
2003-04	2nd Rugby-Bundesliga South/West (II)	3rd
2004-05	2nd Rugby-Bundesliga South/West	3rd
2005-06	2nd Rugby-Bundesliga South/West	3rd
2006-07	2nd Rugby-Bundesliga South/West	6th
2007-08	2nd Rugby-Bundesliga South/West	5th
2008-09	2nd Rugby-Bundesliga South/West	4th
2009–10	2nd Rugby-Bundesliga South/West	2nd
2010–11	2nd Rugby-Bundesliga South/West	3rd
2011–12	2nd Rugby-Bundesliga South/West	7th
2012–13	2nd Rugby-Bundesliga qualification round – South	2nd
2012–13	DRV-Pokal – South-West	4th — Semi finals
2013–14	2nd Rugby-Bundesliga qualification round – South	2nd
2013–14	DRV-Pokal – South-West	3rd — First round
2014–15	2nd Rugby-Bundesliga qualification round – South	3rd
2014–15	Liga-Pokal – South-West	1st — Runners-up
2015–16	2nd Rugby-Bundesliga South	1st
2016–17	2nd Rugby-Bundesliga South	5th
2017–18	2nd Rugby-Bundesliga South	3rd
2018–19	2nd Rugby-Bundesliga South	4th
2019–20	2nd Rugby-Bundesliga South	4th
2020–21	Season Cancelled (COVID Pandemic)	
2021–22	2nd Rugby-Bundesliga South	1st — Promoted
2022–23	1st Rugby-Bundesliga South/West	6th
2023–24	1st Rugby-Bundesliga South/West	4th

- Until 2001, when the single-division Bundesliga was established, the season was divided in autumn and spring, a Vorrunde and Endrunde, whereby the top teams of the Rugby-Bundesliga would play out the championship while the bottom teams together with the autumn 2nd Bundesliga champion would play for Bundesliga qualification. The remainder of the 2nd Bundesliga teams would play a spring round to determine the relegated clubs. Where two placing's are shown, the first is autumn, the second spring. In 2012 the Bundesliga was expanded from ten to 24 teams and the 2nd Bundesliga from 20 to 24 with the leagues divided into four regional divisions.

==== Development team ====
Year	Division	Position
2001-02	Rugby-Regionalliga Bavaria (III)	4th
2002-03	Rugby-Regionalliga Bavaria	3rd
2003-04	Rugby-Regionalliga Bavaria	4th
2004-05	Rugby-Regionalliga Bavaria	5th
2005-06	Rugby-Regionalliga Bavaria	4th
2006–07	Rugby-Regionalliga Bavaria	5th
2007–08	Rugby-Regionalliga Bavaria	4th
2008–09	Rugby-Regionalliga Bavaria	4th
2009–10	Rugby-Regionalliga Bavaria	7th
2010–11	Rugby-Regionalliga Bavaria	4th
2011–12	Rugby-Regionalliga Bavaria	5th
2012–13	Rugby-Regionalliga Bavaria	4th
2013–14	Rugby-Regionalliga Bavaria	5th
2014–15	Rugby-Regionalliga Bavaria	8th
2015–16	Rugby-Regionalliga Bavaria	1st
2016–17	Rugby-Regionalliga Bavaria	4th
2017–18	Rugby-Regionalliga Bavaria	8th
2018–19	Rugby-Regionalliga Bavaria	2nd
2019–20	Rugby-Regionalliga Bavaria	2nd
2020–21	Season Cancelled (COVID Pandemic)	
2021–22	Rugby-Regionalliga Bavaria	3rd
2022–23	Rugby-Regionalliga Bavaria	1st — Promoted
2023–24	2nd Rugby-Bundesliga South	7th

=== Women ===
Year	Division	Position
2002-03	Women's Rugby Bundesliga (I)	4th
2003-04	Women's Rugby Bundesliga	4th — Relegated
2004-05		
2005-06	Women's 2nd Rugby Bundesliga (II)	3rd
2006–07	Women's 2nd Rugby Bundesliga	4th
2007–08	Women's 2nd Rugby Bundesliga	3rd
2008–09	Women's 2nd Rugby Bundesliga	6th
2009–10	Women's 2nd Rugby Bundesliga	6th
2010–11	Women's Rugby Bundesliga	9th
2011–12	Women's Rugby Bundesliga	6th
2012–13		
2013–14		
2014–15	Women's Rugby Bundesliga	8th
2015–16	Women's Rugby Bundesliga	7th
