= RC Aachen =

German rugby union club, based in Aachen

(Germany) RC Aachen
- Full name: Rugby Club Aachen e. V.
- Union: German Rugby Federation
- Founded: 1980; 46 years ago
- Location: Aachen, Germany
- Chairman: Michael Maurer
- Coach: Julius König
- League: Dutch 1st Division
- 2023/24: Dutch 2nd Division, 2nd
Team kit

The RC Aachen is a German rugby union club from Aachen, North Rhine-Westphalia, and currently plays in the 2e klasse. From 2012 till 2015, Aachen played in Rugby-Bundesliga.

== History ==
RC Aachen was formed in 1980, and has made occasional appearances in the 2nd Rugby-Bundesliga South/West, the second tier of the German league system, playing at this level in 2000–01, 2006–07 and again in 2011–12. In between the club played in the tier three Rugby-Regionalliga North Rhine-Westphalia until becoming a founding member of the 3rd Liga South/West in 2010. The team finished the 2011–12 season on a relegation rank in the 2nd Bundesliga but, courtesy to an expansion of the Rugby-Bundesliga from ten to 24 teams, was instead promoted to the first tier of German rugby, the Bundesliga. RCA finished sixth in their group in the 2012–13 season and failed to qualify for the championship round, instead entering the second tier DRV-Pokal, where it came fifth in the south/west division. The club advanced to the quarterfinals of the play-offs after opponent USV Potsdam Rugby canceled their first round play-off game. In the quarterfinals it was knocked out by TSV Handschuhsheim after a 0–107 defeat.

The club once more qualified for the play-offs to the DRV-Pokal in 2013–14, where it lost to Heidelberger TV in the semifinals of the playoffs. In the 2014–15 season the club finished fourth in the south-west DRV-Pokal group and was knocked out by DSV 78 Hannover II in the quarterfinals of the play-offs after a first round victory over Bremen 1860. With the reduction of the Bundesliga from 24 to 16 clubs Aachen dropped back to the 2. Bundesliga in 2015.

In 2020, RC Aachen moved to the Dutch Rugby competition. Accepted by the Dutch Rugby Association. In 2024 RC Aachen achieved promotion to the Eerste Klasse, the second tier level in the Dutch Rugby System.

Former German captain Mustafa Güngör hails from Aachen and began his rugby career at the club in 1990.

== Club honours ==
- Rugby-Regionalliga North Rhine-Westphalia
  - Champions: 2002, 2006

== Recent seasons ==
Recent seasons of the club:

Year	Division	Position
2004–05	Rugby-Regionalliga North Rhine-Westphalia (III)	3rd
2005–06	Rugby-Regionalliga North Rhine-Westphalia	1st — Promoted
2006–07	2nd Rugby-Bundesliga South/West (II)	7th — Relegated
2007–08	Rugby-Regionalliga North Rhine-Westphalia (III)	3rd
2008–09	Rugby-Regionalliga North Rhine-Westphalia	3rd
2000–10	Rugby-Regionalliga North Rhine-Westphalia	2nd
2010–11	3rd Liga South/West (III)	3rd — Promoted
2011–12	2nd Rugby-Bundesliga South/West (II)	9th — Promoted
2012–13	Rugby-Bundesliga qualification round – West	6th
2012–13	DRV-Pokal – South-West	5th — Quarter finals
2013–14	Rugby-Bundesliga qualification round – West	5th
2013–14	DRV-Pokal – South-West	4th — Semi finals
2014–15	Rugby-Bundesliga qualification round – West	4th
2014–15	DRV-Pokal – South-West	4th — Quarter finals — Relegated
2015–16	2nd Rugby-Bundesliga West	2nd

- Until 2001, when the single-division Bundesliga was established, the season was divided in autumn and spring, a Vorrunde and Endrunde, whereby the top teams of the Rugby-Bundesliga would play out the championship while the bottom teams together with the autumn 2nd Bundesliga champion would play for Bundesliga qualification. The remainder of the 2nd Bundesliga teams would play a spring round to determine the relegated clubs. Where two placing's are shown, the first is autumn, the second spring. In 2012 the Bundesliga was expanded from ten to 24 teams and the 2nd Bundesliga from 20 to 24 with the leagues divided into four regional divisions.
