= FC Schwalbe Hannover =

German rugby union club, based in Hannover

(Germany) FC Schwalbe Hannover
- Full name: Fussball Club Schwalbe von 1899 e.V.
- Union: German Rugby Federation
- Founded: 1899; 127 years ago
- Location: Hanover, Germany
- Ground: Bezirkssportanlage Döhren
- Chairman: Rudolf Hille
- League: inactive
- 2011-12: Rugby-Regionalliga North (III), 7th

Official website
- www.fcschwalbe.de

The FC Schwalbe Hannover is a German rugby union club from Hanover, until recently playing in the Rugby-Regionalliga Lower Saxony. Apart from rugby, the club also offers other sports like tennis, basketball and boxing. It is based in the Döhren suburb of Hanover and is the biggest sporting club there.

FC Schwalbe has three German rugby union championship to its name, won in 1923, 1926 and 1936 but has not reached a final since.

The term Schwalbe is the German word for swallow.

== History ==
FC Schwalbe was formed in 1899 as a rugby club, despite the Fussball Club in its name. It took its name from the swallows that were at home in the area around its first playing field.

Schwalbe reached its first German championship final in 1923, which it won 6-3, beating the SC Neuenheim. Another title followed in 1926, this time an 8-0 victory against SC 1880 Frankfurt. The club's third and final triumph came in 1936, when they beat Neuenheim once more, 11-0 on this occasion.

The club was never able to achieve on a similar level again. In 2003, it won promotion to the tier-two 2nd Bundesliga, but was only able to survive at this level for one season, finishing last and being relegated again. After this, it formed a partnership with DRC Hannover and Schwalbe fielded a combined side, together with DRC's reserve team.

In 2008, Schwalbe took out the title in the Rugby-Regionalliga Lower Saxony and then beat SC Siemensstadt on average in the promotion round, winning 19-0 at home and losing 7-16 away. This entitled the team to play in the 2nd Rugby-Bundesliga North/East in 2008-09, where the club lost every game except one, which was a draw, and withdrew its team three rounds from the end.

Relegated from the second division, the partnership between Schwalbe and DRC was terminated and the club now fields an independent team again in the Regionalliga, first in Lower Saxony and then in the Regionalliga North. In the 2012–13 season the club does not field a senior men's team.

== Club honours ==
- German rugby union championship
  - Champions: 1923, 1926, 1936

== Recent seasons ==
Recent seasons of the club:

| Year | Division | Position |
|---|---|---|
| 2001-02 | | |
| 2002-03 | Rugby-Regionalliga Lower Saxony (III) | 2nd — Promoted |
| 2003-04 | 2nd Rugby-Bundesliga North/East (II) | 7th — Relegated |
| 2004-05 | | |
| 2005-06 | Rugby-Regionalliga Lower Saxony | |
| 2005-06 | North/East championship round | 2nd |
| 2006–07 | Rugby-Regionalliga Lower Saxony | 2nd |
| 2006–07 | North/East championship round | 5th |
| 2007–08 | Rugby-Regionalliga Lower Saxony (III) | 1st — Promoted |
| 2008–09 | 2nd Rugby-Bundesliga North/East (II) | 10th — Relegated |
| 2009–10 | Rugby-Regionalliga Lower Saxony (III) | 1st |
| 2010–11 | Rugby-Regionalliga North (III) | 5th |
| 2011–12 | Rugby-Regionalliga North | 7th |

- From mid-2000s to 2009, the club played as SG Schwalbe/DRC Hannover II, which was a combined team of FC Schwalbe and the reserve team of DRC Hannover.
