= RU Hohen Neuendorf =

German rugby union club, based in Hohen Neuendorf

(Germany) RU Hohen Neuendorf
- Full name: Rugbyunion Hohen Neuendorf e.V.
- Union: German Rugby Federation
- Founded: 1997; 29 years ago
- Location: Hohen Neuendorf, Germany
- Ground: Rudolf-Harbig-Sportplatz
- Chairman: Carlo Schomacker
- League: Rugby-Bundesliga (I)
- 2015–16: Rugby-Bundesliga North/East, 8th

Official website
- www.rugbyunion.de

The RU Hohen Neuendorf is a German rugby union club from Hohen Neuendorf, currently playing in the Rugby-Bundesliga.

The club is located in the Oberhavel district, north west of Berlin. The district is home to two more rugby union clubs, Stahl Hennigsdorf Rugby and Veltener RC.

== History ==
The club was formed in November 1997, when Grün-Weiß Birkenwerder and the Rugbyclub Hohen Neuendorf merged.

It achieved promotion from the Rugby-Regionalliga to the 2nd Rugby-Bundesliga in 2003 and spent three seasons at this level, with a fourth place in 2005 as its best result.

After returning to the Regionalliga in 2006, it won promotion to the second division once more in 2008 and now played there as a mid-table side until 2012 when it was forcefully relegated after missing two league matches without adequate excuse.

A championship in the Regionalliga in 2012–13 took the club back up to the 2nd Bundesliga again for the following season. The club qualified for the DRV-Pokal in 2013–14 and was knocked out by Heidelberger TV in the quarter-finals of the play-offs. Promoted to the Rugby-Bundesliga for 2014–15 the club qualified for the championship round where it came seventh and missed out on play-off qualification.

== Recent seasons ==
Recent seasons of the club:

Year	Division	Position
2002-03	Rugby-Regionalliga (III)	Promoted
2003-04	2nd Rugby-Bundesliga North/East (II)	6th
2004-05	2nd Rugby-Bundesliga North/East	4th
2005-06	2nd Rugby-Bundesliga North/East	8th — Relegated
2006-07	Rugby-Regionalliga East A (III)	3rd
2006-07	North/East championship round	4th
2007–08	Rugby-Regionalliga East A	2nd — Promoted
2008–09	2nd Rugby-Bundesliga North/East (II)	6th
2009–10	2nd Rugby-Bundesliga North/East	3rd
2010–11	2nd Rugby-Bundesliga North/East	4th
2011–12	2nd Rugby-Bundesliga North/East	9th — Relegated
2012–13	Rugby-Regionalliga East	1st
2013–14	2nd Rugby-Bundesliga qualification round – East	2nd
2013–14	DRV-Pokal – North-East	3rd — Quarter finals
2014–15	Rugby-Bundesliga qualification round – East	4th
2014–15	Rugby-Bundesliga championship round – North-East	7th
2015–16	Rugby-Bundesliga North-East	8th - Relegated
