= USV Potsdam Rugby =

German rugby union club

(Germany) USV Potsdam Rugby
- Full name: Universitätssportverein Potsdam e.V.
- Union: German Rugby Federation
- Founded: 1949 (club); 1988 (rugby department)
- Location: Potsdam, Germany
- Ground(s): Sportplatz Am Neuen Palais
- Chairman: Prof. Dr. Dieter Wagner
- Coach(es): Robby Lehmann
- League(s): 2. Rugby-Bundesliga (II)
- 2015–16: 2. Rugby-Bundesliga East, 2nd
Team kit

Official website
- rugby-potsdam.de

The USV Potsdam Rugby is a German rugby union club from Potsdam, currently playing in the Rugby-Bundesliga. It is part of a larger multi-sport club, the USV Potsdam, which also offers other sports like basketball, association football and tennis and consists of 19 departments.

== History ==
=== USV Potsdam ===
The club was formed on 11 March 1949 as SG Landeshochschule Potsdam in what was soon to become East Germany. It was later renamed to HSG PH Potsdam.

In 1990, with the imminent dissolution of East Germany, it became the HSG BLH Potsdam, to adopt its current name, USV Potsdam, in July 1991, reflecting its close ties with the University of Potsdam.

=== Rugby department ===
The club's rugby department was formed in 1988. However, rugby in Potsdam dates back to the 1950s. In 1963, a rugby department was formed at the Pädagogischen Hochschule Potsdam, which later joined local club Dynamo Potsdam. In 1988, students at the Pädagogischen Hochschule once more formed a rugby club, the RG 88 Potsdam. Once more, this team joined the local police sports club, the former Dynamo now being renamed PSV Potsdam.

In 1993, this team won promotion to the 2nd Rugby-Bundesliga North for the first time. In 1997, the rugby department then joined the university club USV, its current home.

The team earned promotion to the 2nd Rugby-Bundesliga North/East in 2005, the second tier of German club rugby, by winning its regional division of the Rugby-Regionalliga and succeeding in the promotion round against Welfen Braunschweig und Hamburger RC.

Finishing the first three seasons in this league in the lower half of the table, USV progressed to a third place in 2008-09. In the 2009-10 season, the club leads the league and has a good chance of earning promotion to the Rugby-Bundesliga. The club however is trying to attract sponsorship to be able to afford competing at national level.

A league reform in 2012 allowed the club promotion to the Bundesliga as the league was expanded from ten to 24 teams. USV finished third in their group in the 2012-13 season and qualified for the north/east division of the championship round, where it came sixth. The club opted to not play their first round play-off match, citing player shortage, and was thereby knocked out of the championship with the game awarded 50-0 to the opposition.

The club qualified for the DRV-Pokal in 2013–14 and was knocked out by RC Leipzig in the quarter-finals of the play-offs. At the end of the season the club opted to withdraw from the Bundesliga to the tier three Regionalliga. After a season there in 2013–14 USV earned promotion back to the 2nd Bundesliga for the following year after a Regionalliga championship.

== Honours ==
- Rugby-Regionalliga Nordost
  - Champions: 2015

== Recent seasons ==
Recent seasons of the club:

Year	Division	Position
2003-04	Rugby-Regionalliga East (North) (III)	2nd
2003-04	North/East championship round	3rd
2004-05	Rugby-Regionalliga East A	3rd
2004-05	North/East championship round	3rd — Promoted
2005-06	2nd Rugby-Bundesliga North/East (II)	7th
2006–07	2nd Rugby-Bundesliga North/East	6th
2007–08	2nd Rugby-Bundesliga North/East	7th
2008–09	2nd Rugby-Bundesliga North/East	3rd
2009–10	2nd Rugby-Bundesliga North/East	2nd
2010–11	2nd Rugby-Bundesliga North/East	5th
2011–12	2nd Rugby-Bundesliga North/East	3rd — Promoted
2012–13	Rugby-Bundesliga qualification round – East	3rd
2012–13	Rugby-Bundesliga championship round – North-East	6th — Round of sixteen
2013–14	Rugby-Bundesliga qualification round – East	6th
2013–14	DRV-Pokal – North-East	5th — Quarter finals — Relegated
2014–15	Rugby-Regionalliga	1st — Promoted
2015–16	2nd Rugby-Bundesliga East	2nd

- Until 2001, when the single-division Bundesliga was established, the season was divided in autumn and spring, a Vorrunde and Endrunde, whereby the top teams of the Rugby-Bundesliga would play out the championship while the bottom teams together with the autumn 2nd Bundesliga champion would play for Bundesliga qualification. The remainder of the 2nd Bundesliga teams would play a spring round to determine the relegated clubs. Where two placing's are shown, the first is autumn, the second spring. In 2012 the Bundesliga was expanded from ten to 24 teams and the 2nd Bundesliga from 20 to 24 with the leagues divided into four regional divisions.
