= Hamburger RC =

German rugby union club, based in Hamburg

(Germany) Hamburger Rugby Club (HRC)
- Full name: Hamburger Rugby Club von 1950 e.V.
- Union: German Rugby Federation
- Founded: 1950; 76 years ago
- Location: Hamburg, Germany
- Ground(s): Rugby-Arena Stadtpark, Rugbyplatz Barmwisch Imstedt 6
- Chairman: Alexander Niepold
- Coach: Gareth Jackson
- Captain: Josh Harvey
- League: Rugby-Bundesliga
- 2018–19: Rugby-Bundesliga North/East, 7th
Team kit

Official website
- www.hrc-rugby.de

The Hamburger Rugby Club (HRC) is a German rugby union club from Hamburg, currently playing in the Rugby-Bundesliga.

== History ==
HRC was formed on 6 June 1950, under the leadership of Emil Creydt.

The club suffered a crisis in 1958, when a number of players left to form the Wandsbeker RC, but eventually returned to the HRC. It suffered a second crisis in 1969, when membership had dropped to 50 people and only seven of those were players. It was suggested that the club should fold and its players join SC Urania Hamburg, but the motion was dismissed.

The fortunes of the club took a new turn from 1975, when Emil Creydt died and a new leadership was elected. In 1982, the club won its first Hamburg championship, followed by a second in 1986.

The club achieved a number of good cup runs in the late 1980s and early 90s and even took part in the promotion round to the Rugby-Bundesliga. After this, it temporarily dropped to Rugby-Regionalliga level.

In 1998, the club achieved promotion to the 2nd Rugby-Bundesliga and managed to play at this level until 2005, when it dropped to the third division once more.

It earned promotion back to the 2nd Bundesliga immediately despite only finishing fourth in the Regionalliga. In this league, where it competes as a second club from Hamburg, alongside the rugby department of FC St. Pauli, the team has been struggling against relegation in the past seasons.

Lukas Hinds-Johnson, a current German international, is product of the club but now plays for RK 03 Berlin. Another former youth player of the club is Ferdinand Richter. He was playing for the Espoirs of Stade Toulouse and for the French team Blagnac Sporting Club Rugby. With his brother Valentin Richter (former captain of the Hamburger RC) he played for the Austrian XV.

A league reform in 2012 allowed the club promotion to the Bundesliga as the league was expanded from ten to 24 teams. HRC finished fifth in their group in the 2012–13 season and failed to qualify for the championship round, instead entering the second tier DRV-Pokal, where it came third in the north/east division. The club advanced to the quarter-finals of the play-offs where it was knocked out by Heidelberger TV.

The club qualified for the DRV-Pokal in 2013–14 and received a bye for the first round of the play-offs after coming second in the north-east division of the competition. The club was knocked out in the quarter-finals by RC Aachen. In the 2014–15 season the club finished fourth in the north-east championship group but was knocked out of the first round of the play-offs after an 83–3 loss to SC Neuenheim.

== Recent seasons ==
Recent seasons of the club:

Year	Division	Position
1998–99	2nd Rugby-Bundesliga North/East (II)	7th
1998–99	2nd Rugby-Bundesliga North/East relegation round	3rd
1999–2000	2nd Rugby-Bundesliga North/East	6th
1999–2000	2nd Rugby-Bundesliga North/East relegation round	4th — Relegated
2000–01	Rugby-Regionalliga Lower Saxony (III)	2nd
2000–01	2nd Rugby-Bundesliga North/East relegation round	4th
2001–02	Rugby-Regionalliga Lower Saxony	1st — Promoted
2002–03	2nd Rugby-Bundesliga North/East (II)	7th
2003–04	2nd Rugby-Bundesliga North/East	4th
2004–05	2nd Rugby-Bundesliga North/East	6th — Relegated
2005–06	Rugby-Regionalliga North (III); North/East championship round	4th 1st — Promoted
2006–07	2nd Rugby-Bundesliga North/East (II)	7th
2007–08	2nd Rugby-Bundesliga North/East	8th
2008–09	2nd Rugby-Bundesliga North/East	8th
2009–10	2nd Rugby-Bundesliga North/East	10th
2010–11	2nd Rugby-Bundesliga North/East	9th
2011–12	2nd Rugby-Bundesliga North/East	4th — Promoted
2012–13	Rugby-Bundesliga qualification round – North	5th
2012–13	DRV-Pokal – North-East	3rd — Quarter finals
2013–14	Rugby-Bundesliga qualification round – North	6th
2013–14	DRV-Pokal – North-East	2nd — Quarter finals
2014–15	Rugby-Bundesliga qualification round – North	4th
2014–15	Rugby-Bundesliga championship round – North-East	5th – First round
2015–16	Rugby-Bundesliga North-East	7th
2016-17	Rugby-Bundesliga North-East	6th
2017-18	Rugby-Bundesliga North-East	5th
2018-19	Rugby-Bundesliga North-East	7th

- Until 2001, when the single-division Bundesliga was established, the season was divided in autumn and spring, a Vorrunde and Endrunde, whereby the top teams of the Rugby-Bundesliga would play out the championship while the bottom teams together with the autumn 2nd Bundesliga champion would play for Bundesliga qualification. The remainder of the 2nd Bundesliga teams would play a spring round to determine the relegated clubs. Where two placing's are shown, the first is autumn, the second spring. In 2012 the Bundesliga was expanded from ten to 24 teams and the 2nd Bundesliga from 20 to 24 with the leagues divided into four regional divisions.
