= RSV Köln =

German rugby team

(Germany) RSV Köln
- Full name: Rugby Sport Verein Köln e.V.
- Union: German Rugby Federation
- Founded: 1 March 1951
- Location: Cologne, Germany
- Ground(s): Rugby-Park Köln
- Chairman: Thorsten Modrau
- Coach(es): (France) Eric Daniel
- League(s): Rugby-Bundesliga
- 2015–16: Rugby-Bundesliga South/West, 8th
Team kit

Official website
- www.rugby-koeln.de

The Rugby Sport Verein Köln is a German rugby union club from Cologne, currently playing in the Rugby-Bundesliga. Until 2018 it was part of the multi-sports club ASV Köln, which also offers other sports like athletics, triathlon and karate.

== History ==
=== Sports club ===
The club was formed on 27 February 1929, under the name of Akademischen Sportverein Köln, by students of the University of Cologne. In 1936, it severed its connection to the university and renamed itself to Athletik-Sport-Verein Köln, its current name.

=== Rugby department ===
The rugby department of the ASV was formed on 1 March 1951, being the second-oldest sports department of the club.

The team initially played friendlies against British Army sides and clubs from Belgium before taking part in the German championship from 1953 onwards.

ASV, in recent history, was part of the Rugby-Bundesliga South/West, being relegated in 2001 to the 2nd Rugby-Bundesliga South/West when the Bundesliga was reduced to single-division format.

The club then finished second in its league three times, in 2002, 2007 and 2009. It managed to win its division in 2008 but lost the 2nd Bundesliga final 6–22 to RK 03 Berlin and missed out on promotion. It was however promoted the following season, when the league was won by the reserve team of SC 1880 Frankfurt. Reserve teams being ineligible for Bundesliga promotion, ASV took its spot instead. Suffering from a string of injuries and heavy defeats during the season, the club made the decision in mid-April 2010, to withdraw from the Rugby-Bundesliga and not to play its five remaining matches as they were no longer able to field a full front row. Köln thereby were automatically relegated from the league.

A league reform in 2012 allowed the club promotion to the Bundesliga after the league was expanded from ten to 24 teams. ASV finished fourth in their group in the 2012-13 season and qualified for the south/west division of the championship round, where it came seventh. The club was knocked out in the first round of the play-offs after losing 84–7 to Berliner Rugby Club. The following two seasons, 2013–14 and 2014–15, it qualified for the championship round once more but finished last in its group and did not qualify for the play-offs.

Since the season 2017–18 the club competes under its new name Rugby Sport Verein Köln (RSV Köln), separating from ASV Köln.

== Club honours ==
- 2nd Rugby-Bundesliga
  - Runners up: 2008
- 2nd Rugby-Bundesliga South/West
  - Champions: 2008
  - Runners up: 2002, 2007, 2009

== Recent seasons ==
Recent seasons of the club:

=== Men ===
Year	Division	Position
1998-99	Rugby-Bundesliga South/West (I)	
1998-99	Bundesliga championship round	6th
1999-2000	Rugby-Bundesliga South/West	4th
1999-2000	Bundesliga qualification round	8th
2000-01	Rugby-Bundesliga South/West	6th
2000-01	Bundesliga qualification round	9th — relegated
2001-02	2nd Rugby-Bundesliga South/West (II)	2nd
2002-03	2nd Rugby-Bundesliga South/West	4th
2003-04	2nd Rugby-Bundesliga South/West	7th
2004-05	2nd Rugby-Bundesliga South/West	4th
2005-06	2nd Rugby-Bundesliga South/West	4th
2006-07	2nd Rugby-Bundesliga South/West	2nd
2007-08	2nd Rugby-Bundesliga South/West	1st
2008-09	2nd Rugby-Bundesliga South/West	2nd — Promoted
2009–10	Rugby-Bundesliga (I)	10th — Relegated
2010–11	2nd Rugby-Bundesliga South/West	6th
2011–12	2nd Rugby-Bundesliga South/West	4th — Promoted
2012–13	Rugby-Bundesliga qualification round – West (I)	4th
2012–13	Rugby-Bundesliga championship round – South-West	7th — Round of sixteen
2013–14	Rugby-Bundesliga qualification round – West	3rd
2013–14	Rugby-Bundesliga championship round – South-West	8th
2014–15	Rugby-Bundesliga qualification round – West	3rd
2014–15	Rugby-Bundesliga championship round – South-West	8th
2015–16	Rugby-Bundesliga South-West	8th

- Until 2001, when the single-division Bundesliga was established, the season was divided in autumn and spring, a Vorrunde and Endrunde, whereby the top teams of the Rugby-Bundesliga would play out the championship while the bottom teams together with the autumn 2nd Bundesliga champion would play for Bundesliga qualification. The remainder of the 2nd Bundesliga teams would play a spring round to determine the relegated clubs. Where two placing's are shown, the first is autumn, the second spring. In 2012 the Bundesliga was expanded from ten to 24 teams and the 2nd Bundesliga from 20 to 24 with the leagues divided into four regional divisions.

=== Women ===
Year	Division	Position
2004-05	Women's Rugby Bundesliga (I)	3rd
2005-06	Women's Rugby Bundesliga	5th — Relegated
2006–07	Women's 2nd Rugby Bundesliga (II)	2nd
2007–08	Women's 2nd Rugby Bundesliga	1st
2008–09	Women's 2nd Rugby Bundesliga	1st
2009–10	Women's 2nd Rugby Bundesliga	1st
2010–11	Women's Rugby Bundesliga	6th
2011–12	Women's Rugby Bundesliga	4th
2012–13	Women's Rugby Bundesliga	4th
2013–14	Women's Rugby Bundesliga	2nd
2014–15	Women's Rugby Bundesliga	5th
2015–16	Women's Rugby Bundesliga	3rd
