= Rugby union in Germany =

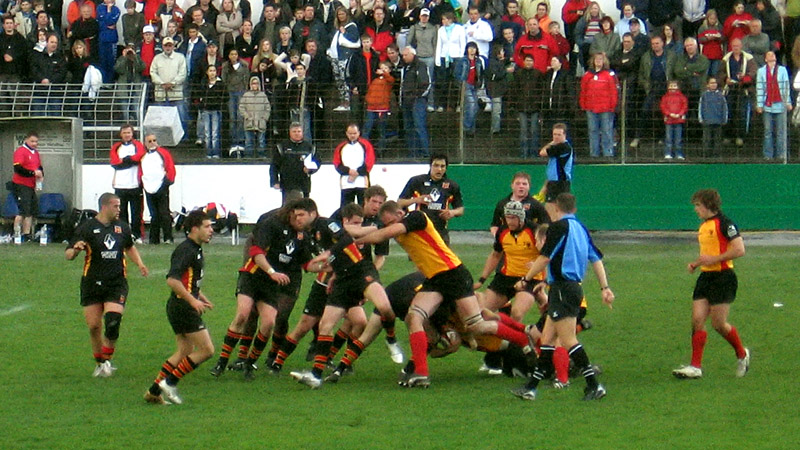
- Germany playing Belgium
- Country: Germany
- Governing body: German Rugby Federation
- National team: Germany
- First played: 1850
- Registered players: 12,072
- Clubs: 124 (men), 5 (women)

National competitions
- Rugby World Cup; Rugby World Cup Sevens; IRB Sevens World Series; European Nations Cup

Club competitions
- Rugby-Bundesliga (I); 2nd Rugby-Bundesliga (II); Rugby-Regionalliga (III)

Rugby union in Germany is a growing sport with 124 men's clubs and 5 women's clubs competing in 4 men's and 1 women's national leagues.

== Governing body ==
The German Rugby Federation (German: Deutscher Rugby-Verband or DRV), founded in 1900, is the governing body for all formats of rugby union in Germany, overseeing 12 regional unions. The DRV is a founding member of Fédération Internationale de Rugby Amateur Association Européenne de Rugby (FIRA-AER) (1934), affiliated with the International Rugby Board since 1999, and a member of the German Olympic Sport Federation.

== History ==
=== From early clubs to a national union ===
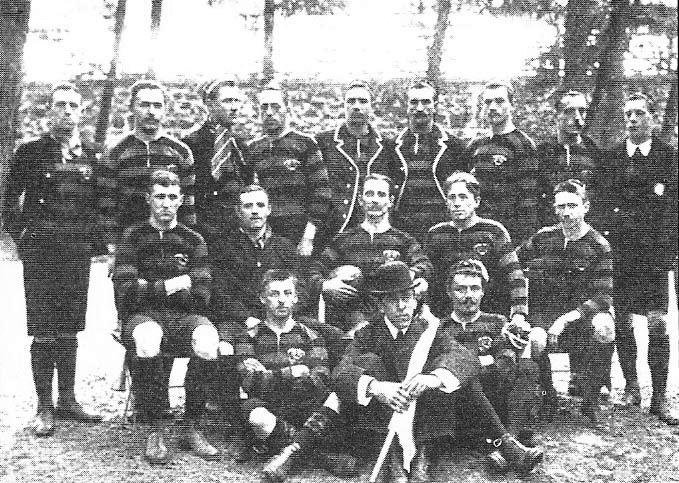
FC 1880 Frankfurt at the 1900 Olympic Games

While rugby union probably reached Germany through affluent British students who attended renowned private grammar schools in the German Confederation, studied in Heidelberg, or completed military service in Hannover, there is disagreement about when the game was first played.

Heidelberg's Neuenheim College (now Heidelberg College) lays claim to its students first playing rugby around 1850. By contrast, in Stuttgart William Cail is regarded as having first introduced rugby, in 1865 at Bad Cannstatt. In Dresden rugby is seen as first emerging there in 1873, while Lüneburg and Hannover make similar claims with regards 1875 and 1876, respectively. Whatever the actual date and place that rugby first kicked off in Germany, the first German-language texts about rugby was published in 1875. Early printed efforts to explain "The Laws of Football Played at Rugby School" was followed by journals and textbooks mentioning the sport.

Rugby enthusiasts worked from within existing clubs serving different sports to establish sections catering to their sport. One of the oldest examples was established on 14 September 1878 by 14-year old schoolboy Ferdinand-Wilhelm Fricke and 24 of his peers at the German Sports Association (Deutsche Sport-Verein von 1878, or DSV 78 Hannover) — the first club in Germany dedicated exclusively to sports played on grass. Fricke's name lives on in Hannover where the German Rugby Federation presently has its offices in a street named for him. Similarly, Neuenheim students under guidance of teacher Edward Hill Ullrich founded a rugby department in 1891 within the Heidelberg Rowing Club (Heidelberger Ruderklub von 1872, or HRK 1872).

As a result of such actions taken to establish rugby around them, Heidelberg and Hannover remain centres of the sport.

The earliest attempt at constituting a national body by merging German clubs occurred when northern clubs initiated the German Rugby Football Federation (Deutschen Rugby-Fußball-Bundes) in 1886. But when that failed, DSV 78 Hannover joined the German Football and Cricket Federation (1891–1902), while clubs in Cannstatt, Frankfurt am Main, Heidelberg and Munich joined the Southern German Football Union (1893–95).

At a rugby day in Heidelberg on 13 February 1898 for players from that city, Stuttgart, and Frankfurt am Main, Ullrich argued for closer ties with northern clubs and the ultimate establishment of a national body, but found little support. Between August 1898 and September 1899 the issue continued to be discussed. At a rugby day in Hannover on 11 March 1900, 19 clubs committed to joint future action, undertaking to translate English rules into German, to organize the first North-South match in November, and to join the German Football Federation.

As no federation had been formed by October 1900 on the occasion of the second Olympic Games in Paris, SC 1880 Frankfurt club was assigned to participate in the rugby section on behalf of Germany, winning the silver medal behind France.

On 4 November 1900 the German Rugby Football Association was established as a separate division within the German football (soccer) association, with Fricke of DSV 1878 Hannover as president. Exactly a year later the rugby association ended its connection with the soccer body and continued independently as the German Rugby Federation (Deutscher Rugby-Verband, or DRV).

=== The first half of the 20th century ===
The first national competition was organised in 1900, when on 4 November a South versus North game was held, won 11–3 by northern Germany. This annual game became a fixture until 1967, when it was replaced by a state championship. In 1999 the German Rugby Federation returned to the old north-south game but its importance has not reached former levels.

In 1909 a national club championship was first organised. The champions of the north, FV 1897 Hannover, met southern club FV 1893 Stuttgart and won 6–3 on 14 November 1909.

Five regional rugby associations were established in the 20th century's first three decades, including northern Germany in 1900 (Hannover); southern Germany in 1909 (Baden, Württemberg, Greater Frankfurt am Main); western Germany in 1922 (Düsseldorf, Cologne, Bonn); and Brandenburg Central in 1924 (Berlin, Leipzig), which in 1930 subdivided into the Brandenburg and Central associations.

In 1927 the German national rugby union team was set up and played its first international on 17 April in Stade de Colombes in Paris. Germany lost 5–30 to France but on 15 May won the return match in Frankfurt 17–16. In the third international between the two countries on 18 March 1928, a record 14,000 spectators attended the game, still the highest attendance number for an international rugby match in Germany.

German rugby peaked in the pre-World War II period, when in 1938, Germany beat France 3–0 for the second time. Long the preserve of the German middle classes, the most prominent German rugby fan/player was the controversial Albert Speer.

Like all other German sport federations, the German Rugby Federation was absorbed in the all-powerful Nazi sports organisation, the Nationalsozialistischer Reichsbund für Leibesübungen, as part of "Department 2", which also served association football and cricket. Hermann Meister, chairman of the German Rugby Federation, a firm believer in a united Europe and a friend of France, tried to live up to his ideals but rugby by and large offered no more resistance to the Nazis than any other sport.

The sport was decimated by World War II as most of its players were killed. Germany, at its height of performance in 1939 and second only to France in continental Europe, lost virtually its whole national team during the war, a predicament from which it has never recovered.

The subsequent post-war social upheaval largely reversed the pre-war successes in German rugby. It came to be seen as a very English game and, as a result, rugby lost the financial support and much of the popularity it had gained in the western and northern cities of Heidelberg, Hanover and Frankfurt.

=== The post-war period ===
Following the War friendly matches were played against British military teams. Of the centres of German rugby, only Heidelberg, future headquarters of the US forces in West Germany, was spared by the bombing raids and the sport of rugby carried low priority in the first post war years. But by the early 1950s the German Rugby Federation (DRV) had re-established itself and the 6 regional associations that had existed before the war.

In 1948 the German championship was restored and the golden area of the TSV Victoria Linden begun, the team winning the title six times in a row from 1951 to 1956, an achievement matched only recently by Heidelberger RK. The first British team to tour Germany after the war was the Oxford Greyhounds in 1950. In the same year, the DRV was restored in West Germany. With the country now divided into East and West following the post-war occupation, East Germany became the first German team to resume playing international rugby when it toured Romania in 1951. It was followed by the West German team a year later, which played its first international against Belgium in 1952. However, neither side was able to achieve the same successes as the pre-war German team.

Rugby showed that it was not immune to the Cold War split when Burt Weiss, an East German player, escaped to West Berlin using a snorkel. The DRV continued to offer the East German DTSB to play a rugby friendly, but this was always declined by the East. After a combined team of Lok and Post Berlin happened to play West German side Berliner SC in a tournament in Olomouc in 1985, a ban on participation in international tournaments with West German clubs was issued by the DTSB.

A Rugby-Bundesliga was formed in 1971 to replace the previously existing regional championships. The hoped for increase in interest however did not materialise and rugby remains a minor sport in Germany, almost exclusively played by amateurs.

In 1989 a German women's national 15s team was founded, initially resorting under Germany's youth rugby organization.

With German reunification in 1990 a number of clubs from former East Germany joined the German league system.

The German Rugby Sports Association of the GDR was dissolved in November 1990 and the state associations of Saxony and Brandenburg with their 17 clubs registered with the DRV. This brought about a restructuring of the Rugby-Bundesliga and the introduction of a second division, 2nd Rugby-Bundesliga.

In 2000 the German Rugby Federation celebrated its centenary. Centenary celebrations included a banquet in the Heidelberg Castle and the hosting of the European leg of the Rugby World Cup Sevens in Heidelberg, in which the German team came close to upsetting Ireland, who had Gordon D'Arcy in their line-up. The tournament was won by the Welsh team, which featured Andy Marinos and Arwel Thomas.

The highlight of the Centenary season was the Centenary Match against the famous Barbarians. The Barbarians included a host of Welsh, English, Scottish, Irish and Australian internationals including Scott Hastings, Peter Stringer, Shaun Longstaff, Jeff Probyn, Frankie Sheahan, Russell Earnshaw, Shaun Connor, John Langford and Derwyn Jones and won 47–19 against a determined German team.

The German federation tendered to host the 2010 Women's Rugby World Cup but the event was awarded to England instead. It did however hold the 2008 Hannover Sevens, the European Sevens championship.

An important part of rugby union outside the structures of the German federation is the Army Rugby Union of the British Army in Germany which holds its own "German" championship. The winner of this competition advances to play the UK Army rugby union champion. The British Army also supported development of the sport in the region by a British Army Germany rugby union team playing the national teams of Germany and its neighbouring countries.

=== Financial crises and current situation ===
The national German women's 15s team was officially disbanded by the DRV in 2005 for financial reasons. The DRV reversed its decision a year later, but in 2010 again suspended the women's 15s program in favour of concentrating all resources on the women's sevens national team. Unofficial women's sides played against Belgium in 2012 and 2013, and a privately funded women's national team, called G15, was established in 2015. Supported by clubs participating in the women's Rugby-Bundesliga, the initiative was partly to persuade the DRV to again set up a national women's program. The G15 defeated Switzerland 47–13 in their first match. On 16 April 2016 the DRV undertook to rebuild the women's 15s national team for a period of two years, after which its efficiency and affordability would be evaluated.

The German Rugby Federation (DRV) found itself close to insolvency in 2011 due to being €200,000 in debt. The situation was brought on in 2010 when the German federal ministry of the interior refused to pay out its annual grant to the DRV, due to ministry concerns that the DRV was not using the funds to support the sport. DRV chairman Claus-Peter Bach fought a legal battle with the ministry which worsened the situation. Bach consequently announced he would not stand for another term in July 2011 and was replaced by Ralph Götz. The DRV secured a private loan to survive and hoped to attract the sponsors that had withdrawn under Bach as well as to reach a settlement with the ministry.

In mid-July 2012 at the Deutsche Rugby Tag (DRT), the DRV's annual general meeting approved a league reform proposed by German international Manuel Wilhelm. The number of clubs in the Rugby-Bundesliga was increased from ten to 24, the league was divided into four regional divisions of six clubs each, and play-off berths were expanded from four to eight teams. A major aim of the reform was to minimize the distances that individual teams had to travel and so to reduce travel costs. The DRV announced that it was able to avoid insolvency and regain its annual grants from the German government on condition that it stuck to a strict financial plan that would see the DRV debt free by 2018. Any violation of this plan would see funding withdrawn and the association confronted with insolvency again.

== Popularity ==
In 2023 there were 20,072 players registered with the German Rugby Federation and 40,470 players in all, according to World Rugby.

Rugby union has a large and dedicated following in several university cities such as Heidelberg.

German players occasionally break through into French or English clubs, such as Robert Mohr at La Rochelle or Sascha Fischer at Périgueux.

== National teams ==
=== Fifteens ===
The German men's national 15s team played their first international match in 1927 against France, but have yet to qualify for the Rugby World Cup. With the partition of Germany following the Second World War, the East and West fielded separate teams until the reunification of Germany in 1990. In 2017–18 the men competed in the Championship Division, the top tier of Rugby Europe's International Championships, a European tournament below the Six Nations. As Germany placed last in the competition, they face a relegation match against Portugal in June 2018. The men's national team was ranked 28th out of 105 teams on World Rugby's May 2018 list.

The German women's national 15s team was founded in 1989 and initially resorted under Germany's youth rugby organization. The team succeeded in qualifying for the 1998 Women's Rugby World Cup as well as the 2002 edition. In 2002 the women's side finished 2nd in the 2002 FIRA Women's European Nations Cup and 4th in 2005. The national women's side was ranked 19th out of 52 teams by World Rugby in March 2018.

=== Sevens ===
Both Germany's men's and women's national rugby sevens teams participate in the major European sevens competition, the Sevens Grand Prix Series.

In 2017 the German men finished 5th out of 12 teams. As the series also functioned as a 2018 Rugby World Cup Sevens qualifying tournament, they missed out on a place. Germany did not qualify for the debut of sevens rugby at the 2016 Summer Olympics. Germany reached the 2018 Rugby Europe Men's U18 Sevens Championship's quarter-final matches where they defeated Great Britain 21–10, before losing 21–0 to Ireland in the semi-finals.

The German national women's side competed in the 2018 Rugby Europe Women's Sevens Grand Prix Series. When they last qualified for this competition they finished 12th out of 12 teams in 2015.

== Fifteens club competitions ==
(see national team article for international competitions)

=== Men's leagues ===
Men's club rugby is organized in four tiers in Germany, with the 2018–19 league structure comprising 16 clubs in the 1st Rugby-Bundesliga, the first level; 26 teams in the 2nd Rugby-Bundesliga, the second-highest level; 60 teams in the Regionalligen, the third-highest level; and 30 teams in the Rugby-Verbandsliga, the fourth tier.

The German rugby union season starts in September each year and is divided into a championship tournament followed by cup competitions. The championship determines which 1st Rugby-Bundesliga club is the overall German men's champion, while the cup competitions determine which 1st Rugby-Bundesliga club wins the Rugby Union Cup (German: DRV-Pokal), and which 2nd Rugby-Bundesliga team claims the League Cup (German: Liga-Pokal).

In the championship the 1st Rugby-Bundesliga and 2nd Rugby-Bundesliga clubs play matches in a round-robin, home-and-away format, followed by semi-final and final contests. The 16 sides in the 1st Rugby-Bundesliga compete within their respective North-East and the South-West divisions. All 2nd Rugby-Bundesliga clubs follow the same format, competing against other clubs within their respective North, East, West, and South divisions.

The championship also determines which teams are promoted to the 1st Rugby-Bundesliga and relegated to the 2nd Rugby-Bundesliga. The two winners of the 2nd Rugby-Bundesliga semi-finals are promoted to the 1st Rugby-Bundesliga for the next season, while the two 8th-placed 1st Rugby-Bundesliga teams are automatically relegated to the 2nd Rugby-Bundesliga. Losing 2nd Rugby-Bundesliga semi-finalists play promotion-relegation matches against 7th-placed 1st Rugby-Bundesliga teams for the same reason.

In the cup competitions 1st Rugby-Bundesliga teams who did not qualify for the championship play-offs compete in a knock-out format for the DRV Cup, while 2nd Rugby-Bundesliga clubs play the same format for the League Cup.

The geographical overview over the different tiers of German Rugby is as follows:

1. Bundesliga

2. Bundesliga

Regionalligen

2018–19 German Rugby Union League Structure
1st Rugby-Bundesliga – 16 clubs
North/East Berlin Grizzlies • Berliner RC • FC St. Pauli • DSV 78 Hannover • Hamburger RC • RC Leipzig • RK 03 Berlin • SC Germania List	South/West Heidelberger RK • RG Heidelberg • Neckarsulmer SU • RC Luxembourg • RK Heusenstamm • SC Frankfurt 1880 • TSV Handschuhsheim • TV 1834 Pforzheim

2nd Rugby-Bundesliga – 26 teams (27 clubs)
North Bremen 1860 • DRC Hannover • FT Adler Kiel von 1893 • SG SV Odin Hannover/VfR Döhren • TSV Victoria Linden	East Berliner RC II • Berliner SV 1892 e.V. • RC Dresden e.V. • SV Stahl Hennigsdorf • USV Jena • Veltener RC	West Grashof RC Essen • RC Aachen • RSV Köln • Rugby Tourists Münster e.V. • SC Frankfurt 1880 II • TGS Hausen • TuS 95 Düsseldorf	South Heidelberger TV • München RFC • RC Rottweil • RC Unterföhring • SC Neuenheim • StuSta München • Stuttgarter RC • TSV 1846 Nürnberg

Regionalliga – 60 teams (66 clubs)
RL North DSV 78 Hannover II • FC St. Pauli II • Northern Lions • SC Germania List II • SG Hamburg Exiles RFC/Hamburger SV • TuS Lübeck 1893 • Welfen Braunschweig	RL North-East Group A Berliner SV 1892 II • Berlin Bruisers • Berliner RC III • RU Hohen Neuendorf • SC Siemensstadt; Group B Berlin Grizzlies II • Berliner SC • RK 03 Berlin II • RV Leipzig Scorpions • SG Berlin Irish/RC Trebbin • USV Halle Rovers	RL West Rhineland Division; RC Aachen II • RC Bonn-Rhein-Sieg • RSV Köln II • SG Bochum/Witten RFC/Rugby Tourists Münster II • SG RC Hürth/WMTV Solingen Zebras • TuS 95 Düsseldorf II; Westphalia Division; SCW Göttingen • RC Bielefeld • RC Osnabrück • RFC Dortmund • RFC Paderborn • Rugby Cassel • Wiedenbrücker TV; RP-LUX Division; FSV Trier-Tarforst • RC Luxembourg II • RC Mainz • RC Walferdange • SG 2018 Hochspeyer • SG RC Worms/SV Südwest Ludwigshafen 1882	RL Hesse BSC Offenbach • Eintracht Frankfurt • RK Heusenstamm II • RU Marburg • SC Frankfurt 1880 III • SG TSV Krofdorf-Gleiberg/SC Riedberg • TG 75 Darmstadt • URC Gießen 01	RL Baden-Württemberg Freiburger RC • Karlsruher SV • Neckarsulmer SU II • RC Konstanz • RC Hirschau Tübingen • RG Heidelberg II • TSV Handschuhsheim II	RL Bayern BTS 1861 Bayreuth • München RFC II • RC Regensburg 2000 • RFC Augsburg e.V. • RFC Bad Reichenhall • StuSta München II • TSB Ravensburg Raven s • Würzburger RK 2012 e.V.

Verbandsliga – 30 teams (39 clubs)
Verbandsliga North North-East; FC St. Pauli III • FT Adler Kiel II • Hamburger RC II • VfL Jesteburg Wombats • RSG M-V (SG Rugby Fortuna Neuenkirchen/Rugby Rostock Dierkower Elche/Rugby Wismar Freibeuter) • SG Hamburger SV/Hamburg Exiles RFC II; North-West; SG SV Bethen/Bremen 1860 II • SG SV Odin Hannover II/VfR Döhren II • SG Schaumburg Royals RFC/VT Union Groß Ilsede • SV 08 Ricklingen • TSV Karlshöfen • TSV Victoria Linden II • Union 60 Bremen	Verbandsliga NRW Brühler TV 1879 • DJK VFL Willich • RC 1960 Hürth II • RSV Köln III • TV Jahn-Rheine Warriors • Wiedenbrücker TV II	VL Baden-Württemberg 6 Tournaments	VL Bayern Allgäu Rugby • FC Eintracht Bamberg • RC Innsbruck • SG 1. SC Gröbenzell/RC Landsberg am Lech • SG TuS Fürstenfeldbrück/TeamMünchen • SG RC Unterföhring II/TV 1861 Ingolstadt • StuSta München III • TSV Nördlingen • TSV 1846 Nürnberg II • TV 1848 Coburg • VFB Ulm

Measured by playoff participation, 15-a-side men's clubs from Hannover and Heidelberg dominate the Rugby-Bundesliga. Former Hannover champions include TSV Victoria Linden, DRC Hannover, and DSV 78 Hannover, while Heidelberg champions include Heidelberg RK, RG Heidelberg and SC Neuenheim. Four teams from three clubs from two foreign countries participate inside the German league system. These are RC Luxembourg and RC Walferdange from Luxembourg, and RC Innsbruck from Austria. Heidelberger RK's win against TV Pforzheim in the 2015 Rugby-Bundesliga final made it the second club after TSV Victoria Linden to win six consecutive titles.

German Men's Club Champions, 1972–2017
Champion	Years	Total
Heidelberger RK	1973, 1976, 1986, 2010–15, 2017	10
TSV Victoria Linden	1972, 1975, 1987, 1989, 1992–94, 1996	8
DRC Hannover	1988, 1998–2002, 2005	7
DSV 78 Hannover	1982–85, 1990–91	6
RG Heidelberg	1979/80, 1996/97, 2005–07	4
SC Neuenheim	1995, 2003–04	3
SC Germania List	1977, 1979, 1981	3
SC 1880 Frankfurt	2008–09	2
FV 1897 Linden	1978	1
SV 08 Ricklingen	1974	1
TV Pforzheim	2016	1

=== Women's leagues ===
A championship for women in the form of a tournament series was introduced in 1988. From 1992 a Women's Rugby-Bundesliga was contested, similar to the league for men. Since then the number of participating clubs have varied from four (2001/02) to six (2004/05); peaking in the 2014/15 season at eight teams. A women's 2nd Rugby-Bundesliga for ten-a-side teams was played from 2005 to 2010, with teams usually completing two games on match day. From 2016 there has been only one women's 15s league, featuring five teams. Heidelberger RK women's side has claimed 7 victories in a row since 2010, a streak broken in 2017 by SC Neuenheim. Neuenheim women hold the overall record with 13 championships since 1988, followed by FC St. Pauli with 8.

German Women's Club Champions, 1988–2017
Champion	Years	Total
SC Neuenheim	1988–93, 1996–99, 2004, 2009, 2017	13
FC St. Pauli	1995, 2000–01, 2003, 2005–08	8
Heidelberger RK	2010–16	7
RC Rottweil	1994	1
DRC Hannover	2002	1

== Rugby positions: German terms ==
In German, the English terminology for rugby positions is not commonly used. The German equivalent for the English terms are:

Number	English	German	Translation
Forwards
1	Loosehead Prop	Linker Pfeiler	Left Pillar
2	Hooker	Hakler	Hooker
3	Tighthead Prop	Rechter Pfeiler	Right Pillar
4	Lock	Zweite-Reihe-Stürmer	Second Row Forward
5	Lock	Zweite-Reihe-Stürmer	Second Row Forward
6	Blindside Flanker	Linker Flügelstürmer	Left Wing-Forward
7	Openside Flanker	Rechter Flügelstürmer	Right Wing-Forward
8	Number 8	Nummer Acht	Number 8
Backs
9	Scrum Half	Gedrängehalb	Scrum Half
10	Fly-half	Verbindungshalb	Connecting Half
11	Left Wing	Kurzer Außendreiviertel	Short Outside Three-quarter
12	Inside Centre	Erster Innendreiviertel	First Inside Three-quarter
13	Outside Centre	Zweiter Innendreiviertel	Second Inside Three-quarter
14	Right Wing	Langer Außendreiviertel	Long Outside Three-quarter
15	Fullback	Schlussmann	Final Man

== German rugby museum ==
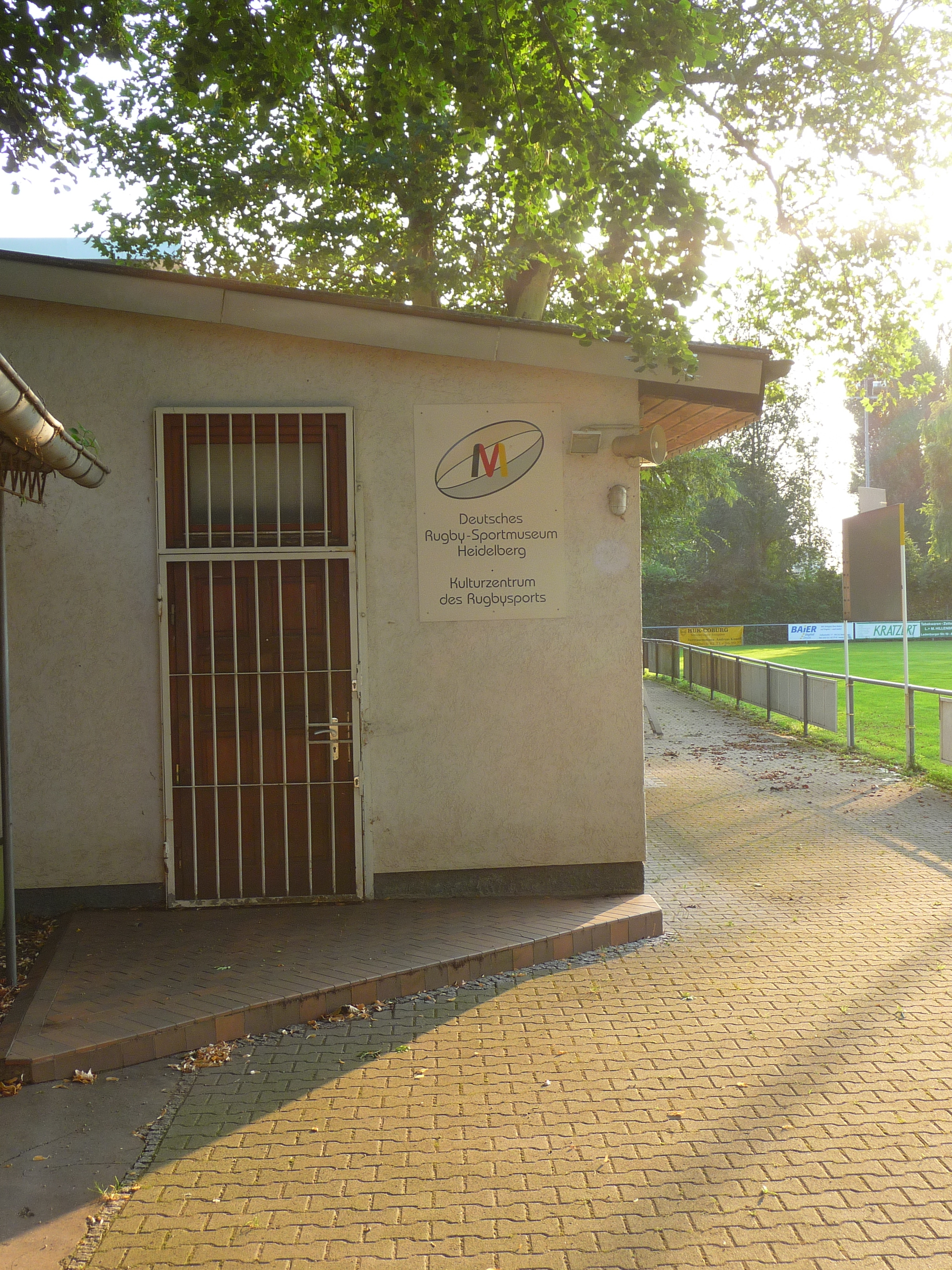
The Deutsches Rugby-Sportmuseum in Heidelberg

The history of rugby in Germany is documented in the Deutsche Rugby-Sportmuseum at Heidelberg which was opened 2 May 1997 by the then-mayor, Beate Weber. The museum consisted of four exhibition rooms, which includes the DRV's first flag from 1900; the coat of arms of the jerseys from Germany's first international match in 1927; and the ball from the 1938 match that Germany won against France. The museum opens during matches of local clubs SC Neuenheim 02 and TSV Handschusheim, or by special arrangement.

== See also ==
- List of rugby union clubs in Germany
- Sport in Germany
- Paul Robert Clauss
