= 2013–14 Rugby-Bundesliga =

- Countries: Germany
- Champions: Heidelberger RK (8th title)
- Runners-up: TV Pforzheim
- Promoted: RU Hohen Neuendorf SG Siemensstadt/Grizzlies
- Relegated: 08 Ricklingen/Wunsdorf Veltener RC USV Potsdam Rugby RC Mainz TuS 95 Düsseldorf

The 2013–14 Rugby-Bundesliga was the 43rd edition of this competition and the 94th edition of the German rugby union championship. In the Rugby-Bundesliga, twenty-four teams played in, initially, four regional divisions, the first stage of the competition, followed by a championship round of sixteen clubs and, finally, the play-offs consisting of twelve teams. The season started on 24 August 2013 and finished with the championship final on 21 June 2014 in Pforzheim, interrupted by a winter break from 8 December to 22 February. The regular season finished on 19 April and the play-offs started on 3 May, with the German championship final held on 21 June 2014, which was contested between TV Pforzheim and Heidelberger RK. Heidelberg won its fifth consecutive national championship when it defeated Pforzheim 43–20 in the final.

The defending champions were Heidelberger RK who defeated SC Neuenheim in the 2013 final to take out its ninth championship and fourth in a row. Heidelberger RK remained unbeaten throughout the 2013–14 regular season, as it had been all throughout the 2012–13 Rugby-Bundesliga season, having last lost in the Bundesliga on 1 November 2011, when HRK was beaten 26–24 by TV Pforzheim.

== Overview ==
Location of teams in the Rugby-Bundesliga 2013-14

The league saw only minor changes compare to the previous season, playing at full strength of 24 clubs in 2013–14 instead of only 22. Promoted to the league were 08 Ricklingen/Wunstorf, TuS 95 Düsseldorf and Veltener RC while RC Luxembourg had withdrawn from the competition.

The first stage of the competition, the Vorrunde, saw four six-team groupes in which each team played the other five just once. This stage finished in late September after which the second stage started, the Qualifikationsphase, in which the top teams each from the southern and the western group play each other in one group while the top teams from the north and east play each other in another. A new addition compare to the previous season was that the fourth placed team from each division would play the fifth placed in the opposite group to determine the last two places in the second round. The six teams not qualified for the Qualifikationsphase entered the DRV-Pokal, the German rugby union cup, together with the top eight teams of the 2nd Bundesliga. The 2nd Bundesliga teams not qualified for the DRV-Pokal in turn played for the Liga Pokal.

In the second stage the teams within a group would play each other in a home-and-away format, with the teams that already played each other in the first stage carrying over those results. Of the sixteen clubs the best six in each group now qualified for the knock-out stage. The knock-out stage was played in a single-game format with the higher seeded team enjoying home advantage and the winner advancing to the next round.

== Bundesliga tables & results ==
=== First stage ===
In the first stage twenty-four clubs played in four groups. Within each group each team played the other just once. The best three teams advanced directly to the second stage while the teams placed fourth and fifth had to play a qualifying decider.

==== North ====
The division table:

	Club	Played	W	D	L	PF	PA	Diff	BP	Points
1	DSV 78 Hannover	5	5	0	0	439	26	413	5	25
2	FC St. Pauli Rugby	5	4	0	1	135	95	40	2	18
3	SC Germania List	5	3	0	2	87	153	–66	1	13
4	TSV Victoria Linden	5	2	0	3	94	180	–86	3	11
5	08 Ricklingen/Wunstorf	5	1	0	4	84	187	–103	4	8
6	Hamburger RC	5	0	0	5	59	257	–198	1	1

- Relegated: 08 Ricklingen/Wunstorf (withdrawn)
- Promoted: none

==== East ====
The division table:

	Club	Played	W	D	L	PF	PA	Diff	BP	Points
1	Berliner Rugby Club	5	5	0	0	356	21	335	5	25
2	RK 03 Berlin	5	4	0	1	348	76	272	4	18
3	Berliner SV 92 Rugby	5	2	0	3	132	185	–53	3	9
4	RC Leipzig	5	2	0	3	78	283	–205	1	9
5	Veltener RC	5	1	0	4	83	304	–221	2	6
6	USV Potsdam Rugby	5	1	0	4	108	236	–128	2	4

- Relegated: Veltener RC, USV Potsdam Rugby
- Promoted: RU Hohen Neuendorf, SG Siemensstadt/Grizzlies

==== West ====
The division table:

	Club	Played	W	D	L	PF	PA	Diff	BP	Points
1	RK Heusenstamm	5	5	0	0	325	43	282	4	24
2	SC 1880 Frankfurt	5	4	0	1	251	55	196	4	20
3	ASV Köln Rugby	5	3	0	2	76	162	–86	0	12
4	RC Mainz	5	2	0	3	125	200	–75	1	9
5	RC Aachen	5	1	0	4	75	216	–141	2	6
6	TuS 95 Düsseldorf	5	0	0	5	18	194	–176	0	0

- Relegated: RC Mainz, TuS 95 Düsseldorf
- Promoted: none

==== South ====
The division table:

	Club	Played	W	D	L	PF	PA	Diff	BP	Points
1	Heidelberger RK	5	5	0	0	280	46	234	5	25
2	TV Pforzheim	5	4	0	1	305	79	226	4	18
3	TSV Handschuhsheim	5	2	1	2	112	198	–86	1	11
4	RG Heidelberg	5	2	0	3	132	177	–45	2	10
5	SC Neuenheim	5	1	1	3	120	99	21	3	7
6	Heidelberger TV	5	0	0	5	47	397	–350	0	–2

- SC Neuenheim and Heidelberger TV deducted two points each.
- Relegated: none
- Promoted: none

=== Qualifying matches ===
Four qualifying matches were held to determine the last four clubs to enter the second stage. The fourth placed club in the southern division played the fifth placed team in the western division and the fourth placed western club the fifth placed southern team. The same system applied to the northern and eastern division. The winners of the four games advanced to the second stage while the losers had to enter the DRV-Pokal.

==== North-East ====
28 September 2013

RC Leipzig	7 – 29	08 Ricklingen/Wunstorf

28 September 2013

TSV Victoria Linden	88 – 5	Veltener RC

==== South-West ====
28 September 2013

RG Heidelberg	108 – 0	RC Aachen

2 October 2013

SC Neuenheim	124 – 0	RC Mainz

=== Second stage ===
In the second stage sixteen clubs played in two groups of eight clubs each. Within each group each team played the others home and away except for the match-ups that already had been played in the first round. The results of those were carried over. The best six teams in each group qualified for the play-offs and were seeded according to the final standings.

==== North-East ====
The division table:

	Club	Played	W	D	L	PF	PA	Diff	BP	Points
1	DSV 78 Hannover	12	12	0	0	754	127	627	11	59
2	Berliner Rugby Club	12	9	0	3	466	179	287	8	44
3	RK 03 Berlin	12	8	0	4	427	179	293	9	41
4	SC Germania List	12	6	0	6	319	399	–80	3	27
5	FC St. Pauli Rugby	12	6	0	6	264	315	–51	0	24
6	TSV Victoria Linden	12	2	0	10	187	443	–256	1	9
7	Berliner SV 92 Rugby	12	1	0	11	75	895	–820	0	2
8	08 Ricklingen/Wunstorf	0	0	0	0	0	0	0	0	0

- 08 Ricklingen/Wunstorf withdrew at the end of March 2014 because of a lack of players and was removed from competition, an automatic process after failing to field a team on two occasions.

==== South-West ====
The division table:

	Club	Played	W	D	L	PF	PA	Diff	BP	Points
1	Heidelberger RK	14	14	0	0	1108	68	1040	14	70
2	TV Pforzheim	14	12	0	2	922	213	709	12	60
3	SC Neuenheim	14	8	1	5	420	326	94	8	42
4	RG Heidelberg	14	8	0	6	390	392	–2	6	38
5	RK Heusenstamm	14	6	0	8	342	601	–259	6	30
6	TSV Handschuhsheim	14	4	1	9	285	473	–188	5	23
7	SC 1880 Frankfurt	14	3	0	11	231	733	–502	4	16
8	ASV Köln Rugby	14	0	0	14	96	989	–892	0	–2

- ASV Köln Rugby deducted two points for failing to field in the away game against TV Pforzheim on 12 December 2013.

=== Play-off stage ===
In the play-offs the twelve qualified teams played four rounds. The best two clubs in each division received a bye for the first round and entered in the quarter-finals stage. The first round was played on 26 April, with one game held a week later. The quarter finals were held on 3 May, except one game which was held on 10 May. The semi finals were held on 17 May, followed by a break of over one month before the final was played on 21 June:

First Round
RK 03 Berlin	33
RK Heusenstamm	19
RG Heidelberg	101
TSV Victoria Linden	10
SC Neuenheim	55
FC St. Pauli	3
SC Germania List	22
TSV Handschuhsheim	31

Quarterfinals
Heidelberger RK	76
RK 03 Berlin	12
Berliner Rugby Club	31
RG Heidelberg	24
DSV 78 Hannover	29
SC Neuenheim	13
TV Pforzheim	84
TSV Handschuhsheim	7

Semifinals
Heidelberger RK	101
Berliner Rugby Club	5
DSV 78 Hannover	13
TV Pforzheim	44

Final
Heidelberger RK	43
TV Pforzheim	20

== DRV-Pokal tables & results ==
The eight worst clubs in the first stage of the Bundesliga entered the DRV-Pokal for 2013–14, together with the eight best clubs from the 2nd Rugby-Bundesliga. The DRV-Pokal ranks as a second tier to the German championship but also functioned as a qualifying competition for the 2014–15 Rugby-Bundesliga. The modus for the DRV-Pokal was the same as for the German championship, with a second stage with two divisions of eight teams, followed by the play-offs made up of the best twelve teams, with the top two in each division receiving a bye for the first round.

=== Group stage ===
==== North-East ====
The division table:

	Club	Played	W	D	L	PF	PA	Diff	BP	Points
1	RC Leipzig^{‡}	14	12	0	2	546	226	320	11	59
2	Hamburger RC^{‡}	14	11	0	3	532	179	353	11	55
3	RU Hohen Neuendorf	14	8	2	4	462	272	190	8	44
4	SG Siemensstadt/Grizzlies	14	7	1	6	449	364	85	7	37
5	USV Potsdam Rugby^{‡}	14	7	1	6	313	342	–29	6	36
6	Bremen 1860	14	3	0	11	239	484	–245	4	16
7	Veltener RC^{‡}	14	3	0	11	217	613	–396	4	16
8	DRC Hannover	14	3	0	11	183	461	–278	2	14

==== South-West ====
The division table:

	Club	Played	W	D	L	PF	PA	Diff	BP	Points
1	Heidelberger TV^{‡}	14	13	1	0	605	113	492	12	66
2	RC Rottweil	14	11	0	3	483	194	289	7	51
3	München RFC	14	8	1	5	318	229	89	4	38
4	RC Aachen^{‡}	14	7	0	7	379	249	130	7	35
5	TSV Handschuhsheim II	14	6	0	8	350	328	22	6	30
6	RC Mainz^{‡}	14	5	0	9	325	295	30	6	26
7	TuS 95 Düsseldorf^{‡}	14	4	0	10	143	479	–336	0	16
8	Eintracht Frankfurt Rugby	14	1	0	13	116	832	–716	2	6

- ^{‡} Denotes 2013–14 Bundesliga club.

=== Play-off stage ===
The 2013–14 final was played on 28 June 2014 in Rottweil. The play-offs for the DRV-Pokal started on 10 May 2014. The final was originally to be contested between RC Leipzig and Heidelberger TV but Leipzig's semi final win against RC Rottweil was later converted into a win for Rottweil because the former used an ineligible player.

First Round; 10 May
München RFC	15
USV Potsdam Rugby	32
SG S'stadt/Grizzlies	29
RC Mainz	21
RU Hohen Neuendorf	31
TSV H'schuhsheim II	16
RC Aachen	26
Bremen 1860	8

Quarterfinals; 24 May
RC Leipzig	46
USV Potsdam Rugby	11
RC Rottweil	33
SG S'stadt/Grizzlies	12
Heidelberger TV	78
RU Hohen Neuendorf	0
Hamburger RC	10
RC Aachen	23

Semifinals; 14 June
RC Leipzig	0
RC Rottweil	50
Heidelberger TV	36
RC Aachen	17

Final; 28 June
RC Rottweil	5
Heidelberger TV	11
