= Eintracht Frankfurt Rugby =

German rugby union club, based in Frankfurt am Main

- Full name: Sportgemeinde Eintracht Frankfurt von 1899 e.V.
- Union: German Rugby Federation
- Founded: 1899 (club); 1923 (rugby department)
- Location: Frankfurt am Main, Germany
- Ground: Sportplatz Philipp-Holzmann-Schule
- Chairman: Marko Deichman
- League: 2. Rugby-Bundesliga (II)
- 2015–16: 2. Rugby-Bundesliga West, 6th

Official website
- www.eintracht-frankfurt.de/sportarten/rugby.html

The Eintracht Frankfurt Rugby is a German rugby union club from Frankfurt am Main, currently playing in the 2nd Rugby-Bundesliga, the second tier of rugby in Germany. It is part of a larger club, the Eintracht Frankfurt, which also offers other sports like association football, table tennis and basketball.

The team has twice appeared in the German rugby union championship final, in 1940 and 1965, but lost on both occasions. It was also a founding member of the Rugby-Bundesliga in 1971.

== History ==
Formed in 1923, the team, for the most part of its history, stood and stands in the shadow of local rival SC 1880 Frankfurt. In 1931, Julius Fischer became the first Eintracht player to appear for the German national rugby team.

The clubs rugby department achieved its first national success in 1940, when it reached the German championship final, losing 6–19 to FV 1897 Linden. It made a second finals appearance in 1965, this time losing 12–17 to TSV Victoria Linden.

In 1971, Eintracht became a founding member of the southern division of the Rugby-Bundesliga.

The club did not survive in the Rugby-Bundesliga however, eventually being relegated to the tier-three Rugby-Regionalliga Hesse, where it plays today. In the early 2000s, the team took part in the promotion round to the 2nd Rugby-Bundesliga South/West but did not succeed in achieving promotion to this level, instead remaining a top of the table side in the Regionalliga. It has won the local Hesse championship more than ten times since 1955.

From 2010 onwards, Eintracht entered the new third division 3rd Liga South/West, where it played as a mid-table side. However, a league expansion saw the club return to the 2nd Bundesliga for 2012–13. In the 2012–13 season the club competed in the 2nd Bundesliga, finishing in the lower half of the table and qualifying for the play-offs for the Liga-Pokal. The club was knocked out in the first round of the play-offs after a defeat at Welfen SC Braunschweig.

The club qualified for the south-west division DRV-Pokal in 2013–14, but missed out on the play-offs after coming last in its group. In the 2014–15 season the club finished fifth in the south-west Liga-Pokal group but was knocked out in the quarter-finals of the play-offs after a 48–40 loss to RC Dresden.

== Club honours ==
- German rugby union championship
  - Runners up: 1940, 1965
- Rugby-Regionalliga Hesse
  - Champions: 2002, 2003, 2010
  - Runners up: 2004, 2009

== Recent seasons ==
Recent seasons of the club:

Year	Division	Position
2001–02	Rugby-Regionalliga Hesse (III)	1st
2002–03	Rugby-Regionalliga Hesse	1st
2003–04	Rugby-Regionalliga Hesse	2nd
2004–05	Rugby-Regionalliga Hesse	
2005–06	Rugby-Regionalliga Hesse/Rhineland-Palatinate	4th
2006–07	Rugby-Regionalliga Hesse	5th
2007–08	Rugby-Regionalliga Hesse	4th
2008–09	Rugby-Regionalliga Hesse	2nd
2009–10	Rugby-Regionalliga Hesse	1st
2010–11	3rd Liga South/West (III)	5th
2011–12	3rd Liga South/West - North	4th
2012–13	2nd Rugby-Bundesliga qualification round – West	5th
2012–13	Liga-Pokal – South-West	6th — Round of sixteen
2013–14	2nd Rugby-Bundesliga qualification round – West	2nd
2013–14	DRV-Pokal – South-West	8th
2014–15	2nd Rugby-Bundesliga qualification round – West	6th
2014–15	Liga-Pokal – South-West	5th – First round
2015–16	2nd Rugby-Bundesliga West	6th

- Until 2001, when the single-division Bundesliga was established, the season was divided in autumn and spring, a Vorrunde and Endrunde, whereby the top teams of the Rugby-Bundesliga would play out the championship while the bottom teams together with the autumn 2nd Bundesliga champion would play for Bundesliga qualification. The remainder of the 2nd Bundesliga teams would play a spring round to determine the relegated clubs. Where two placing's are shown, the first is autumn, the second spring. In 2012 the Bundesliga was expanded from ten to 24 teams and the 2nd Bundesliga from 20 to 24 with the leagues divided into four regional divisions.
