= Rugby-Welfen Braunschweig =

German rugby union club, based in Braunschweig

(Germany) Welfen Braunschweig
- Full name: Rugby Welfen Braunschweig (beim TuRa e.V. 1865)
- Union: German Rugby Federation
- Founded: 27 January 1954; 71 years ago 1865 (parent club)
- Location: Braunschweig, Germany
- Ground(s): Am Bienroder Weg; Rote Wiese (until 2014)
- League: 2. Rugby-Bundesliga (II)
- 2015–16: 2. Rugby-Bundesliga North, 7th

Official website
- www.rugby-braunschweig.de

Rugby-Welfen Braunschweig is a German rugby union team from Braunschweig, Lower Saxony, currently playing in the 2nd Rugby-Bundesliga. The team is part of a larger sports club, TuRa Braunschweig, which apart from rugby also offers other sports like athletics, basketball, gymnastics and pétanque. The team is named after the House of Welf.

== History ==
Former logo

=== Post SV Braunschweig ===
The history of the club's rugby section goes back to 27 January 1954. On that date, the rugby section of Post SV Braunschweig, a large multi-sports club, was founded. The club played mostly in regional lower-tier competitions, but in 1991 won their first (and only) promotion into the Rugby-Bundesliga, but suffered relegation again after just one season at the top-level.

=== Welfen SC Braunschweig ===
In the late 1990s, Post SV Braunschweig ran into financial problems, which eventually led to the club's dissolution in 2001. Due to this, the rugby section separated from the parent club and joined Welfen SC Heidberg, another local sports club, in 1999. The club, based in the Heidberg district of Braunschweig and founded in 1973, later changed its name into Welfen SC Braunschweig.

After several seasons in the Rugby-Regionalliga, Welfen SC won promotion back to the 2nd Rugby-Bundesliga in 2011. In the 2014–15 season the club finished second in the north-east Liga-Pokal group and was knocked out by TuS 95 Düsseldorf in the quarter-finals of the play-offs.

=== TuRa Braunschweig ===
In 2014 the rugby players of Welfen SC decided to leave the club again due to being dissatisfied with the condition of the club's grounds. On 1 January 2015 they joined Turn- und Rasensportverein Braunschweig (short: TuRa Braunschweig), but continue to compete under the name Rugby-Welfen Braunschweig. TuRa Braunschweig had been founded as the city's second gymnastics club (after MTV Braunschweig) in 1865. The club's athletes have also won several German championships in other sports such as acrobatic gymnastics and Steinstossen.

== Recent seasons ==
Recent seasons of the club:

Year	Division	Position
2010–11	Rugby-Regionalliga (III)	1st — Promoted
2011–12	2nd Rugby-Bundesliga North/East (II)	8th
2012–13	2nd Rugby-Bundesliga qualification round – North	3rd
2012–13	Ligapokal – North/East	3rd — Quarter finals
2013–14	2nd Rugby-Bundesliga qualification round – North	3rd
2013–14	Ligapokal – North/East	1st — Quarter finals
2014–15	2nd Rugby-Bundesliga qualification round – North	4th
2014–15	Ligapokal — North/East	2nd — Quarter finals
2015–16	2nd Rugby-Bundesliga North	7th
