= Heidelberger TV =

German rugby union club, based in Heidelberg

(Germany) Heidelberger TV Rugby
- Full name: Heidelberger Turnverein 1846 e.V.
- Union: German Rugby Federation
- Founded: 1846; 180 years ago
- Location: Heidelberg, Germany
- Ground: Hans-Hassemer-Platz
- Chairman: Janis Kruse (Germany)
- Coach: Thomas Kurzer (Germany)
- League: 2. Rugby-Bundesliga (II)
- 2025–26: 2. Rugby-Bundesliga South
Team kit

Official website
- www.htv-rugby.de/info.php

The Heidelberger TV is a German rugby union club from Heidelberg, currently playing in the Rugby-Bundesliga. Apart from rugby, the club also offers other sports like basketball, tennis and badminton.

The club has three German rugby union championship finals-appearances to its name, having lost the title game in 1974, 1979 and 1994, but has never won the championship. In 2014 and 2015 the club won the finals of DRV-CUP and became CUP-champions for ninety-six years in a row.

== History ==
HTV, formed in 1846, has always stood in the shadow of the other, more successful, rugby clubs in Heidelberg, like SC Neuenheim, Heidelberger RK, RG Heidelberg and TSV Handschuhsheim. It only came to prominence in national rugby when it reached the 1974 final, which was lost 9-15 to SV 08 Ricklingen.

The club made a return to the national final in 1979, this time losing to SC Germania List. After an era of little success, the team reached the German championship final for a third time in 1994, this time losing to TSV Victoria Linden.

HTV declined after this and dropped to 2nd Rugby-Bundesliga level, from where it unsuccessfully tried to return. With the reorganisation of the German league system in 2001, the reduction of the Rugby-Bundesliga to a single division, the task of promotion became even harder and HTV dropped to the mid-field of the league.

The club played the 2008-09 season as a combined team with the reserve side of SC Neuenheim, as SG Heidelberger TV/SC Neuenheim II but despite this finished last in the league and was relegated to the third-division Rugby-Regionalliga. From there, the club hoped to make a quick return to the second division.

After a year in the Regionalliga, HTV entered the new 3rd Liga South/West for the 2010-11 season, won the championship there and earned promotion back to the 2nd Bundesliga. A second-place finish behind Frankfurts reserve team in 2012 allowed the club promotion to the Bundesliga, with the league being expanded from ten to 24 teams. HTV finished sixth in their group in the 2012-13 season and failed to qualify for the championship round, instead entering the second tier DRV-Pokal, where it came second in the south/west division. The club advanced to the final where it lost 42-10 to TSV Handschuhsheim.

The club once more qualified for the play-offs to the DRV-Pokal in 2013–14, where it received a bye for the first courtesy to coming first in the south-west division of the competition and advanced to the final against RC Rottweil which it won 11–5. In the 2014–15 season the club once more finished first in the south-west division of the DRV-Pokal and defeated RC Rottweil 30–12 in the final of the DRV-Pokal. With the reduction of the Rugby-Bundesliga from 24 to 16 teams HTV was relegated to the 2nd Bundesliga.

== Club honours ==
- German rugby union championship
  - Runners up: 1974, 1979, 1994
- German rugby union cup
  - Champions: 2014, 2015
  - Runners up: 2013
- 2nd Rugby-Bundesliga South/West
  - Runners up: 2012
- 3rd Liga South/West
  - Champions: 2011

== Recent seasons ==
Recent seasons of the club:

Year	Division	Position
1998-99	2nd Rugby-Bundesliga South/West	
1998-99	Bundesliga qualification round	11th
1999–2000	2nd Rugby-Bundesliga South/West	2nd
1999–2000	Bundesliga qualification round	12th
2000-01	2nd Rugby-Bundesliga South/West	3rd
2000-01	Bundesliga qualification round	10th
2001-02	2nd Rugby-Bundesliga South/West	6th
2002-03	2nd Rugby-Bundesliga South/West	5th
2003-04	2nd Rugby-Bundesliga South/West	6th
2004-05	2nd Rugby-Bundesliga South/West	6th
2005-06	2nd Rugby-Bundesliga South/West	7th
2006–07	2nd Rugby-Bundesliga South/West	4th
2007–08	2nd Rugby-Bundesliga South/West	7th
2008–09	2nd Rugby-Bundesliga South/West (II)	10th — relegated
2009–10	Rugby-Regionalliga (III)	1st
2010-11	3rd Liga South/West (III)	1st — promoted
2011–12	2nd Rugby-Bundesliga South/West	2nd — Promoted
2012–13	Rugby-Bundesliga qualification round – South	6th
2012–13	DRV-Pokal – South-West	2nd — Runners-up
2013–14	Rugby-Bundesliga qualification round – South	6th
2013–14	DRV-Pokal – South-West	1st — Champions
2014–15	Rugby-Bundesliga qualification round – South	6th
2014–15	DRV-Pokal – South-West	1st — Champions — Relegated
2015–16	2nd Rugby-Bundesliga South	3rd

- Until 2001, when the single-division Bundesliga was established, the season was divided in autumn and spring, a Vorrunde and Endrunde, whereby the top teams of the Rugby-Bundesliga would play out the championship while the bottom teams together with the autumn 2nd Bundesliga champion would play for Bundesliga qualification. The remainder of the 2nd Bundesliga teams would play a spring round to determine the relegated clubs. Where two placing's are shown, the first is autumn, the second spring. In 2012 the Bundesliga was expanded from ten to 24 teams and the 2nd Bundesliga from 20 to 24 with the leagues divided into four regional divisions.

== Rugby internationals ==
The club had four players selected for the German under-18 team at the 2010 European Under-18 Rugby Union Championship, these being Nicolas Kurzer, Robert Hittel, Hannes Huber and Matthias Kunzmann.
