= German Rugby Union Championship =

- Sport: Rugby union
- Founded: 1909
- Country: Germany
- Most recent champion: Men: TV Pforzheim Women: Heidelberger RK

The German Rugby Union Championship was established in 1909 and has since been played, with exceptions, annually. It is the highest competition in Germany in the sport of Rugby Union.

== History ==
=== Men ===
The German Rugby Federation, the DRV was formed on 4 November 1900 in Kassel.

The first final of the German championship was played on 14 November 1909 in Stuttgart. Originally it was played between the two best teams out of the regional competitions. In 1962, a cup competition, the DRV-Pokal, was introduced, and additionally, a league cup was formed in 1983. All competitions are played annually.

In 1971, the Rugby-Bundesliga was established, from then on the two best teams out of this league would play in the final.

The TSV Victoria Linden from Hannover is the record champion, having won 20 titles so far. Until 2006, every final included a team from Hannover. Since then, in 2006, 2007 and 2008, no team from this city has reached the German final.

From 1996, a German championship in sevens rugby has been organised. This competition has been held annually since, except in 2001 and 2002.

=== Women ===
A German women's championship was established in 1988 and has been held annually since. Since 2000, the women also organise a sevens championship.

== 2015–16 season ==
=== Men ===
The top two teams in each division of the two divisions of the Bundesliga qualified for the play-offs with the semi-finals held on 30 April and the final on 7 May 2016:

Round 1
30 April 2016, Berlin
RK 03 Berlin	15
TV Pforzheim	30
30 April 2016, Heidelberg
Heidelberger RK	104
SC Germania List	12

Round 2
7 May 2016, Heusenstamm
TV Pforzheim	41
Heidelberger RK	36

=== Women ===
The 2015–16 women's final was once more contested between Heidelberger RK and SC Neuenheim and held on 14 May 2016 in Heidelberg, with HRK defeating Neuenheim 13–10.

== Men's championship finals ==
Since 1909, the German rugby champions are determined by a final (except in 2001-02), nowadays held between the two top teams of the Rugby-Bundesliga:

=== Championship finals ===
Season	Winner	Runner-up	Result
1908-09	FC 1897 Hannover	FV Stuttgart	6-3
1909-10	FC Frankfurt 1880	SV Odin Hannover	3-0
1910-11	not held		
1911-12	FC Neuenheim	FC 1897 Hannover	13-6
1912-13	FC 1880 Frankfurt	DFV 1878 Hannover	3-0
1913-14	SV Odin Hannover	FC Neuenheim	3-0
1914-19	not held		
1919-20	SV Odin Hannover	SC 1880 Frankfurt	3-0
1920-21	FC Neuenheim	Hawa-Alexandria Hannover	11-0
1921-22	SC 1880 Frankfurt	Hawa-Alexandria Hannover	3-0
1922-23	FC Schwalbe Hannover	SC Neuenheim	6-3
1923-24	SC Neuenheim	TSV Victoria Linden	8-3
1924-25	SC 1880 Frankfurt	SC Linden	33-13
1925-26	FC Schwalbe Hannover	SC 1880 Frankfurt	8-0
1926-27	Heidelberger RK	TSV Victoria Linden	10-6
1927-28	Heidelberger RK	DFV 1878 Hannover	8-0
1928-29	TSV Victoria Linden	Heidelberger RK	5-0
1929-30	SV Odin Hannover	RG Heidelberg	13-0
1930-31	SV Odin Hannover	SC 1880 Frankfurt	38-0
1931-32	FV 1897 Linden	RG Heidelberg	6-5
1932-33	VfR Döhren	RG Heidelberg	3-0
1933-34	VfR Döhren	FV 1897 Linden	8-3
1934-35	not held		
1935-36	FC Schwalbe Hannover	SC Neuenheim	11-0
1936-37	FV 1897 Linden	RG Heidelberg	32-11
1937-38	VfV Hannover	RG Heidelberg	14-3
1938-39	VfV Hannover	SC Neuenheim	16-0
1939-40	FV 1897 Linden	Eintracht Frankfurt	19-6
1940-41	SC Elite Hannover	BSC Siemens Berlin	11-3 / 12-8
1941-42	SG Ordnungspolizei Berlin	SC Germania List	13-9
1942-47	not held		
1947-48	TSV Victoria Linden	Berliner SV 92	30-0
1948-49	SC Neuenheim	SC Germania List	11-0
1949-50	SV 08 Ricklingen	SC Neuenheim	6-0
1950-51	TSV Victoria Linden	SC Neuenheim	18-9
1951-52	TSV Victoria Linden	SC 1880 Frankfurt	22-3
1952-53	TSV Victoria Linden	TSV Handschuhsheim	19-8
1953-54	TSV Victoria Linden	SC Neuenheim	23-3
1954-55	TSV Victoria Linden	TSV Handschuhsheim	6-3
1955-56	TSV Victoria Linden	TSV Handschuhsheim	12-6
1956-57	TSV Handschuhsheim	SC Elite Hannover	6-3
1957-58	TSV Victoria Linden	SC Neuenheim	21-0
1958-59	VfR Döhren	RG Heidelberg	10-5
1959-60	SV 08 Ricklingen	TSV Handschuhsheim	17-0
1960-61	SV Odin Hannover	SC Neuenheim	5-0
1961-62	TSV Victoria Linden	SC Neuenheim	11-3
1962-63	SV Odin Hannover	TSV Handschuhsheim	11-3
1963-64	DSV 1878 Hannover	FC St. Pauli	11-0
1964-65	TSV Victoria Linden	Eintracht Frankfurt	17-12
1965-66	SC Neuenheim	DSV 1878 Hannover	9-3
1966-67	SC Neuenheim	TSV Victoria Linden	11-9
1967-68	DSV 1878 Hannover	TSV Handschuhsheim	8-6
1968-69	TSV Victoria Linden	SC 1880 Frankfurt	25-3
1969-70	DSV 1878 Hannover	RG Heidelberg	20-6
1970-71	Heidelberger RK	DSV 1878 Hannover	14-9
1971-72	TSV Victoria Linden	SC Neuenheim	17-16
1972-73	Heidelberger RK	SV 08 Ricklingen	3-0
1973-74	SV 08 Ricklingen	Heidelberger TV	15-9
1974-75	TSV Victoria Linden	Heidelberger RK	12-4
1975-76	Heidelberger RK	TSV Victoria Linden	35-0
1976-77	SC Germania List	Heidelberger RK	16-9
1977-78	FV 1897 Linden	TSV Handschuhsheim	24-16
1978-79	SC Germania List	Heidelberger TV	9-0
1979-80	RG Heidelberg	FV 1897 Linden	16-10
1980-81	SC Germania List	Heidelberger RK	28-19
1981-82	DSV 78 Hannover	RG Heidelberg	15-6
1982-83	DSV 78 Hannover	RG Heidelberg	16-12
1983-84	DSV 78 Hannover	TSV Victoria Linden	27-6
1984-85	DSV 78 Hannover	Heidelberger RK	24-9
1985-86	Heidelberger RK	DSV 1878 Hannover	15-9
1986-87	TSV Victoria Linden	DSV 1878 Hannover	24-0
1987-88	DRC Hannover	DSV 1878 Hannover	12-9
1988-89	TSV Victoria Linden	Berliner RC	20-6
1989-90	DSV 78 Hannover	SC Neuenheim	31-4
1990-91	DSV 78 Hannover	TSV Victoria Linden	6-3
1991-92	TSV Victoria Linden	SV 08 Ricklingen	59-3
1992-93	TSV Victoria Linden	DSV 1878 Hannover	18-14
1993-94	TSV Victoria Linden	Heidelberger TV	15-3
1994-95	SC Neuenheim	TSV Victoria Linden	14-13
1995-96	TSV Victoria Linden	RG Heidelberg	9-8
1996-97	RG Heidelberg	TSV Victoria Linden	15-13
1997-98	DRC Hannover	TSV Victoria Linden	25-20
1998-99	DRC Hannover	RG Heidelberg	24-10 / 11-22
1999–2000	DRC Hannover	TSV Victoria Linden	45-12 / 34-3
2000-01	DRC Hannover	SC Neuenheim	28-16 / 8-13
2001-02	DRC Hannover	not held	
2002-03	SC Neuenheim	DRC Hannover	18-9
2003-04	SC Neuenheim	DRC Hannover	23-18
2004-05	DRC Hannover	TSV Handschuhsheim	21-9
2005-06	RG Heidelberg	SC Neuenheim	13-9
2006-07	RG Heidelberg	SC 1880 Frankfurt	23-15
2007-08	SC 1880 Frankfurt	RG Heidelberg	28-13
2008-09	SC 1880 Frankfurt	Heidelberger RK	11-8
2009-10	Heidelberger RK	SC 1880 Frankfurt	39-22
2010-11	Heidelberger RK	SC 1880 Frankfurt	12-9
2011-12	Heidelberger RK	TV Pforzheim	20-16
2012-13	Heidelberger RK	SC Neuenheim	41-10
2013-14	Heidelberger RK	TV Pforzheim	43-20
2014-15	Heidelberger RK	TV Pforzheim	53-27
2015-16	TV Pforzheim	Heidelberger RK	41–36

Source:"Die Deutschen Meister der Männer". Deutscher Rugby Verband. Archived from the original on 2007-10-25.

=== Winners & Finalists ===
As of 2016, this is the standing in the all-time winners list of the German championship:

Club	Championships	Finals
TSV Victoria Linden	20	30
Heidelberger RK	12	19
DSV 78 Hannover	9	17
SC Neuenheim	9	24
DRC Hannover	7	9
SC 1880 Frankfurt	6	13
SV Odin Hannover	6	7
RG Heidelberg	4	16
FV 1897 Linden	4	6
FC Schwalbe Hannover	3	3
VfR Döhren	3	3
SC Germania List	3	5
SV 08 Ricklingen	3	5
VfV Hannover	2	2
TV Pforzheim	1	4
SG Ordnungspolizei Berlin	1	1
SC Elite Hannover	1	2
FC 1897 Hannover	1	1
TSV Handschuhsheim	1	8
Heidelberger TV	0	3
Eintracht Frankfurt Rugby	0	2
Hawa-Alexandria Hannover	0	2
Berliner RC	0	1
FC St Pauli Rugby	0	1
Berliner SV 92 Rugby	0	1
BSC Siemens Berlin	0	1
SC Linden	0	1
FV Stuttgart	0	1

=== Winners by city ===
Rugby in Germany is predominantly played in Heidelberg and Hanover, which is reflected in championship wins by city (as of 2015):

City	Wins
Hanover	62
Heidelberg	26
Frankfurt	6
Berlin	1

=== Sevens rugby championship finals ===
Season	Winner	Runner-up	Result
1995-96	SC Neuenheim	RG Heidelberg	23-12
1996-97	RG Heidelberg	SC Neuenheim	7-5
1997-98	RG Heidelberg	SC Neuenheim	33-5
1998-99	RG Heidelberg	DRC Hannover	33-20
1999–2000	TSV Victoria Linden	RG Heidelberg	40-12
2000-01	not held		
2001-02	not held		
2002-03	RG Heidelberg	Karlsruher SV	31-7
2003-04	TSV Handschuhsheim	RG Heidelberg	20-5
2004-05	RG Heidelberg	RK Heusenstamm	36-17
2005-06	RK Heusenstamm	Berliner RC	19-14 aet
2006-07	SC 1880 Frankfurt	RG Heidelberg	40-26
2007-08	RG Heidelberg	SC 1880 Frankfurt	26-24
2008-09	RG Heidelberg	RK Heusenstamm	31-19
2009-10	SC 1880 Frankfurt	SC Neuenheim	29-12
2010-11	Heidelberger RK	RG Heidelberg	25-14
2011-12	TV Pforzheim	Heidelberger RK	31-24
2012-13	Heidelberger RK	TV Pforzheim	20-19
2013-14	Heidelberger RK	TV Pforzheim	24-19
2014–15	RG Heidelberg	Heidelberger RK	24–17

Source:"Die Deutschen Siebener-Meister der Männer". Deutscher Rugby Verband. Archived from the original on 2007-10-25.

== Women's championship finals ==
Since 1988, the German women's rugby champions are determined by a final:

=== Championship finals ===
Season	Winner	Runner-up	Result
1987-88	SC Neuenheim		
1988-89	SC Neuenheim		
1989-90	SC Neuenheim		
1990-91	SC Neuenheim	DRC Hannover	30-0
1991-92	SC Neuenheim		
1992-93	SC Neuenheim	DRC Hannover	22-7
1993-94	RC Rottweil	SC Neuenheim	3-0
1994-95	FC St. Pauli	SC Neuenheim	23-5
1995-96	SC Neuenheim	FC St. Pauli	14-5
1996-97	SC Neuenheim	FC St. Pauli	12-8
1997-98	SC Neuenheim	FC St. Pauli	26-12
1998-99	SC Neuenheim	FC St. Pauli	17-15
1999–2000	FC St. Pauli	SC Neuenheim	39-3
2000-01	FC St. Pauli	SC Neuenheim	37-8
2001-02	DRC Hannover	FC St. Pauli	18-17
2002-03	FC St. Pauli	SC Germania List	25-0
2003-04	SC Neuenheim	FC St. Pauli	31-5
2004-05	FC St. Pauli	SC Neuenheim	15-0
2005-06	FC St. Pauli	SC Germania List	17-5
2006-07	FC St. Pauli	Heidelberger RK	34-17
2007-08	FC St. Pauli	SC Neuenheim	29-7
2008-09	SC Neuenheim	Heidelberger RK	24-23
2009-10	Heidelberger RK	SC Neuenheim	37-5
2010-11	Heidelberger RK	SC Neuenheim	58-5
2011-12	Heidelberger RK	FC St. Pauli	27-19
2012-13	Heidelberger RK	SC Neuenheim	19-0
2013-14	Heidelberger RK	SC Neuenheim	14-7
2014–15	Heidelberger RK	SC Neuenheim	10–7
2015–16	Heidelberger RK	SC Neuenheim	13–10

Source:"Die Deutschen Meister der Frauen". Deutscher Rugby Verband. Archived from the original on 2007-10-25.

=== Sevens rugby championship finals ===
Season	Winner	Runner-up	Result
1999–2000	FC St. Pauli		
2000-01	FC St. Pauli		
2001-02	FC St. Pauli		
2002-03	SC Germania List	SC Neuenheim	5-0
2003-04	SC Germania List	SC Neuenheim	20-0
2004-05	ASV Köln	SC Neuenheim	10-5
2005-06	Heidelberger RK	SC Germania List	40-0
2006-07	SC Neuenheim	FC St. Pauli	22-17
2007-08	Heidelberger RK	SC Neuenheim	24-15
2008-09	Heidelberger RK		no final
2009-10	Heidelberger RK	SC Neuenheim	29-0
2010-11	Heidelberger RK	SG Berlin	60-5
2011-12	Heidelberger RK	SC Neuenheim	30-7
2012-13	Heidelberger RK	SC Neuenheim	37-14

Source:"Die Deutschen Siebener Meister der Frauen". Deutscher Rugby Verband. Archived from the original on 2007-10-25.

== East Germany ==
The East German championship was held from 1952 to 1990, with the Stahl Hennigsdorf Rugby as the most successful team, winning 27 championships:

Season	Winner	Runner-up
1952	BSG Stahl Hennigsdorf	
1953	BSG Stahl Hennigsdorf	
1954	DHfK Leipzig	
1955	DHfK Leipzig	
1956	SC Vorwärts Berlin	
1957	DHfK Leipzig	
1958	DHfK Leipzig	
1959	not held	
1960	BSG Stahl Hennigsdorf	
1961	BSG Stahl Hennigsdorf	
1962	BSG Stahl Hennigsdorf	
1963	DHfK Leipzig	
1964	BSG Lokomotive Wahren Leipzig	
1965	BSG Stahl Hennigsdorf	
1966	BSG Stahl Hennigsdorf	
1967	BSG Stahl Hennigsdorf	
1968	BSG Stahl Hennigsdorf	
1969	BSG Stahl Hennigsdorf	
1970	BSG Stahl Hennigsdorf	
1971	BSG Stahl Hennigsdorf	
1972	BSG Stahl Leegebruch	
1973	BSG Stahl Hennigsdorf	
1974	BSG Stahl Hennigsdorf	
1975	BSG Stahl Hennigsdorf	
1976	BSG Stahl Hennigsdorf	
1977	BSG Stahl Hennigsdorf	
1978	BSG Lokomotive Wahren Leipzig	BSG Stahl Hennigsdorf
1979	BSG Lokomotive Wahren Leipzig	BSG Stahl Hennigsdorf
1980	BSG Lokomotive Wahren Leipzig	BSG Stahl Hennigsdorf
1981	BSG Stahl Hennigsdorf	
1982	BSG Stahl Hennigsdorf	
1983	BSG Stahl Hennigsdorf	
1984	BSG Stahl Hennigsdorf	
1985	BSG Stahl Hennigsdorf	
1986	BSG Stahl Hennigsdorf	
1987	BSG Stahl Hennigsdorf	
1988	BSG Stahl Hennigsdorf	BSG Stahl Brandenburg
1989	BSG Stahl Hennigsdorf	BSG Post Berlin
1990	BSG Stahl Hennigsdorf	BSG Post Berlin

== See also ==
- German rugby union cup
