= Stuttgarter RC =

German rugby union club

(Germany) Stuttgarter RC
- Full name: Stuttgarter Rugby Club e.V.
- Union: German Rugby Federation
- Founded: 1934
- Location: Stuttgart, Germany
- Ground: Hohe Eiche
- Chairman: Sabine Missbach
- League: 2. Rugby-Bundesliga (II)
- 2015–16: 2. Rugby-Bundesliga South, 7th
Team kit

Official website
- www.rugby-stuttgart.de

The Stuttgarter RC is a German rugby union club from Stuttgart, currently playing in the 2nd Rugby-Bundesliga.

== History ==
=== Predecessors ===
The origins of the club go back to 1934 when the first Stuttgarter Rugby Club was formed. The club disappeared and was later reformed in 1958.

The new club joined the PSG Stuttgart shortly after re-formation and, under this name, won a first Southern German championship in 1971. It took almost 20 years for PSG to repeat this success, winning the championship once more in 1990 and earning promotion to the Rugby-Bundesliga.

The early 1990s were to become club's most successful era, reaching the final of the German league cup twice and winning it in 1992. In 1995 however, it suffered relegation from the Bundesliga and, the year after, dropped to the third division Rugby-Regionalliga. In 1997 finally, PSG was declared bankrupt and the rugby era at the club finished.

=== Current club ===
A new Stuttgarter Rugby Club was formed the following year and formed an on-the-field union with TV Pforzheim. The new team won the Southern German championship once more but SRC decided to terminate the partnership with TVP and retained an independent team in the Regionalliga.

In this league, it finished runners-up in 2006, followed by a championship the year after, which was won without a defeat. It followed up with a title in the Southern German Regionalliga championship and promotion to the 2nd Rugby-Bundesliga South/West.

The club finished second in the league in its first season there, but only managed a ninth place in 2009. In 2009-10, the team was back at the top of the table and won the South/West championship as well as the 2nd Bundesliga one, but indicated that it would not take up promotion to the Bundesliga. The club also has a successful women's team, which plays at the highest level in Germany, the Women's Rugby Bundesliga, but has yet to win a national championship at this level.

The season after its 2nd Bundesliga title, the club finished on a relegation spot and dropped down to the 3rd Liga South/West for 2011-12. The team finished third in the southern division in 2012 but was knocked out in the semi-finals and initially missed out on promotion. However, a league expansion saw the club return to the 2nd Bundesliga for 2012-13. In the 2012-13 season the club competed in the 2nd Bundesliga, finishing in the lower half of the table and qualifying for the play-offs for the Liga-Pokal. The club advanced to the final of the Liga-Pokal where it narrowly lost 13-12 to Bremen 1860.

The club qualified for the south-west division of the Liga-Pokal in 2013–14 and was knocked out by Neckarsulmer SU in the semi-finals of the play-offs. In the 2014–15 season the club finished sixth in the south-west Liga-Pokal group and was knocked out by TSV Handschuhsheim II in the quarter-finals of the play-off after a first round win over USV Jena.

== Club honours ==
- Southern German rugby union championship
  - Champions: 1971, 1990, 1999, 2007
- German rugby union league cup
  - Winner: 1992
  - Runners up: 1991
- 2nd Rugby-Bundesliga South/West
  - Champions: 2010
  - Runners up: 2008
- Rugby-Regionalliga Baden-Württemberg
  - Champions: 2007
  - Runners up: 2006

== Recent seasons ==
Recent seasons of the club:

=== Men ===
Year	Division	Position
2000-01	Rugby-Regionalliga Baden-Württemberg (III)	
2001-02	Rugby-Regionalliga Baden-Württemberg	4th
2002-03	Rugby-Regionalliga Baden-Württemberg	5th
2003-04	Rugby-Regionalliga Baden-Württemberg	3rd
2004-05	Rugby-Regionalliga Baden-Württemberg	
2005-06	Rugby-Regionalliga Baden-Württemberg	2nd
2006–07	Rugby-Regionalliga Baden-Württemberg	1st — Promoted
2007–08	2nd Rugby-Bundesliga South/West	2nd
2008–09	2nd Rugby-Bundesliga South/West	9th
2009–10	2nd Rugby-Bundesliga South/West (II)	1st
2010–11	2nd Rugby-Bundesliga South/West	9th — Relegated
2011–12	3rd Liga South/West (III)	3rd — Semi finals
2012–13	2nd Rugby-Bundesliga qualification round – South	5th
2012–13	Liga-Pokal – South-West	3rd — Runners-up
2013–14	2nd Rugby-Bundesliga qualification round – South	4th
2013–14	Liga-Pokal – South-West	3rd — Semi finals
2014–15	2nd Rugby-Bundesliga qualification round – South	6th
2014–15	Liga-Pokal – South-West	6th — Quarter finals
2015–16	2nd Rugby-Bundesliga South	7th

- Until 2001, when the single-division Bundesliga was established, the season was divided in autumn and spring, a Vorrunde and Endrunde, whereby the top teams of the Rugby-Bundesliga would play out the championship while the bottom teams together with the autumn 2nd Bundesliga champion would play for Bundesliga qualification. The remainder of the 2nd Bundesliga teams would play a spring round to determine the relegated clubs. Where two placing's are shown, the first is autumn, the second spring. In 2012 the Bundesliga was expanded from ten to 24 teams and the 2nd Bundesliga from 20 to 24 with the leagues divided into four regional divisions.

=== Women ===
Year	Division	Position
2004-05		
2005-06	Women's 2nd Rugby Bundesliga	1st
2006–07	Women's 2nd Rugby Bundesliga (II)	1st
2007–08	Women's Rugby Bundesliga (I)	5th
2008–09	Women's Rugby Bundesliga	4th
2009–10	Women's Rugby Bundesliga	3rd
2010–11	Women's Rugby Bundesliga	10th
2011–12	Women's Rugby Bundesliga	5th
2012–13	Women's Rugby Bundesliga	5th
2013–14	Women's Rugby Bundesliga	7th
2014–15	Women's Rugby Bundesliga	6th
2015–16		
