= 2. Rugby-Bundesliga =

German 2nd tier rugby union competition

- Sport: Rugby union
- Founded: 1990
- No. of teams: 28
- Country: Germany
- Most recent champion: RC Luxembourg

The 2. Rugby-Bundesliga is the second-highest level of Germany's Rugby union league system, organised by the German Rugby Federation. Its set below the Rugby-Bundesliga, the top-tier of German rugby, and above the Rugby-Regionalliga, the third tier.

The league was undergoing a major revamp for the 2012-13 season with the number of clubs expanded from 20 to 24 and the league divided into four regional divisions of six teams each. Above the 2nd Bundesliga the Bundesliga was organised in a similar fashion.

== History ==
The Second Bundesligas were formed after the German reunion in the early 1990s, originally as four regional leagues, North, East, West and South. Later, the four leagues were merged to form two leagues, South/West and North/East. By 2017 the league structure had been again divided into four groups.

Since 2002, the two champions of the leagues play a 2nd Bundesliga championship final which also determines the clubs promoted to the Bundesliga.

The bottom clubs in the league are relegated to the Rugby-Regionalliga, the third tier of rugby in Germany. The top-teams of the Regionalliga are promoted in turn.

The four groups cover the following states in 2017:

State associations in the 2nd Bundesliga, 2017
| North | East | South | West |
| Schleswig-Holstein | Brandenburg | Baden-Württemberg | North Rhine-Westphalia |
| Hamburg | Berlin | Bavaria | Hesse |
| Bremen | Saxony | | Rhineland-Palatinate |
| Lower Saxony | Thuringia | | |

In the 2008-09 season, only nine of the sixteen German states have clubs at this level. Bremen, Mecklenburg-Vorpommern, Saxony, Saxony-Anhalt, Schleswig-Holstein, Thuringia and Saarland have no 2nd Bundesliga club.

With the RC Luxembourg, a team from Luxembourg, a non-German side competes in the league. The inclusion of this side in the 2009 promotion round to the 2nd Bundesliga caused some debate in regards to its legality, as the club had not qualified through the German league system and was not a member of any of the German regional rugby federations. However, RC Luxembourg's application was declared valid in regards to the German rugby federations rules and regulations and the team finished second in the promotion round, earning a place in the 2nd Bundesliga for 2009-10.

As a sign of the gap between the Bundesliga and the 2nd Bundesliga, TSV Victoria Linden, who only won the 2009-10 North/East division in the last round of the championship, declined promotion, citing the additional cost of travelling and the limited player pool as their reason. The South/West champion, Stuttgarter RC, has also indicated that it would not take up promotion, leaving the Bundesliga with only eight clubs for the next season. It also meant, for the first time ever, that no club from Hanover would compete at the top level of German rugby. DSV 78 protested the decision to reduce the league to eight teams again and thereby relegating the club. For the 2nd Bundesliga, this also meant, only one team each would be promoted to the two regional divisions to keep the strength at ten teams per league. In the North/East, this was SC Siemensstadt, the club being directly promoted, while, in the South/West, TV Pforzheim won the promotion tournament of the five southern Regionalliga champions in Nuremberg on 12 June 2010.

On 22 August 2011, five days before the 2011-12 season start, the RG Heidelberg withdrew its reserve team from the 2nd Rugby-Bundesliga South/West, citing inability to guarantee a full player squad for the whole season and thereby forcing the South/West division to compete with nine clubs only. The Berliner RC II withdrew during the season, also citing a lack of players as the reason while the RU Hohen Neuendorf was disqualified after not fielding a team in two league games.

In mid-July 2012 the Deutsche Rugby Tag, the annual general meeting of the DRV decided to approve a league reform proposed by German international Manuel Wilhelm. The new system saw the number of clubs in the 2nd Bundesliga increased from 20 to 24 and the league divided into four regional divisions of six clubs each. One of the main aims of the reform was to reduce the number of kilometres travelled by individual teams and therefore reduce the travel expenses. The system will remain mostly unchanged for the 2013-14 season. The only changes will be a play-off between the fourth and fifth placed teams in each group after the first stage to determine the clubs advancing to the second stage. The championship play-offs after the second stage will be reduced from sixteen to twelve clubs with the top two teams in each group advancing directly to the quarter-finals while the remaining eight will play a wild card round to determine the other four quarter finalists.

From 2015 onwards the Bundesliga was reduced to sixteen clubs while the 2. Bundesliga remains at twenty four, divided into four regional groups. The winners of these four divisions would play each other for two direct promotion spots to the Bundesliga while the two losers of these games would face the seventh placed clubs from the Bundesliga.

== Clubs Participating in 2026/27 Season ==
=== North/East ===
- Berliner SV 1892
- RK 03 Berlin
- VfR Döhren
- Hamburger RC
- RC Leipzig
- FC St. Pauli
- TSV Victoria Linden

=== South/West ===
- Heidelberger TV
- RK Heusenstamm
- RSV Köln
- RC Rottweil
- StuSta München
- Stuttgarter RC
- RC Unterföhring
- (Luxembourg) Rugby Club Walferdange

== 2nd Bundesliga championship finals ==
| **Season** | **North/East** | **South/West** | **Result** |
| 2001-02 | Post SV Berlin | **München RFC** | 21-23 |
| 2002-03 | **SC Germania List** | BSC Offenbach | 22-14 |
| 2003-04 | **RK 03 Berlin** | BSC Offenbach | 28-23 |
| 2004-05 | DSV 78/08 Ricklingen | **Heidelberger RK** | 6-18 |
| 2005-06 | RK 03 Berlin | **SC 1880 Frankfurt** | 5-39 |
| 2006-07 | SC Germania List | **RK Heusenstamm** | 10-52 |
| 2007-08 | **RK 03 Berlin** | ASV Köln | 22-6 |
| 2008-09 | DSV 78/08 Ricklingen | **SC 1880 Frankfurt II** | 10-24 |
| 2009-10 | TSV Victoria Linden | **Stuttgarter RC** | 10-59 |
| 2010-11 | TSV Victoria Linden | **TV Pforzheim** | 0-89 |
| 2011-12 | FC St. Pauli Rugby | **SC 1880 Frankfurt II** | 22-32 |
| 2015-16 | München RFC | **RC Luxembourg** | 9-12 |

- Winner in **bold**.

== 2nd Bundesliga champions until 2001 ==
Before the establishment of the single-division Bundesliga, the two 2nd Bundesligas determined their champion in the autumn half of the season before splitting each division into two groups, the upper half playing for Bundesliga promotion together with the bottom clubs of the Bundesliga, and the lower half against 2nd Bundesliga relegation. Teams from the two regional divisions did not meet and now country-wide 2nd Bundesliga championship as such was played. The autumn champions were:

| **Season** | **North/East** | **South/West** |
| 1999–2000 | FC St. Pauli | RC Bonn-Rhein-Sieg |
| 2000-01 | Berliner RC | RK Heusenstamm |

== Placings in the 2nd Bundesliga since 2001 ==
Since 1998, the following clubs have played in the league. From 1999 to 2001, the league consisted of two regional divisions of six teams each. After an autumn (A) round, the top three from each group would reach the championship finals round in spring (S). The bottom three, together with the top three from each of the two 2nd Bundesligas would play a promotion round in spring with the top three in each group playing in the Bundesliga the following autumn. In 1997-98 and from 2001 to 2012, the league has been played in a single-division format. From 2012–13 to 2014–15 it had been divided into a first (I) and second round (II), followed by play-offs:

=== North/East ===
| **Club** | **98** | **99** | | **00** | | **01** | | **02** | **03** | **04** | **05** | **06** | **07** | **08** | **09** | **10** | **11** | **12** | **13** | | **14** | | **15** | | **16** |
| **Club** | **98** | **A** | **S** | **A** | **S** | **A** | **S** | **02** | **03** | **04** | **05** | **06** | **07** | **08** | **09** | **10** | **11** | **12** | **I** | **II** | **I** | **II** | **I** | **II** | **16** |
| Berliner RC | **1** | ♦ | 1 | ♦ | 3 | 1 | 1 | ♦ | ♦ | ♦ | ♦ | ♦ | ♦ | ♦ | ♦ | ♦ | ♦ | ♦ | ♦ | ♦ | ♦ | ♦ | ♦ | ♦ | ♦ |
| RK 03 Berlin ^{2} | | | | | | | | | | **1** | ♦ | **1** | 2 | **1** | ♦ | ♦ | ♦ | ♦ | ♦ | ♦ | ♦ | ♦ | ♦ | ♦ | ♦ |
| DSV 78 Hannover ^{1} | ♦ | ♦ | ♦ | ♦ | ♦ | ♦ | ♦ | ♦ | ♦ | ♦ | **1** | ♦ | ♦ | 4 | 1 | ♦ | ♦ | ♦ | ♦ | ♦ | ♦ | ♦ | ♦ | ♦ | ♦ |
| FC St. Pauli Rugby | 8 | | 7 | 1 | 6 | 5 | 7 | 6 | 3 | 5 | 2 | 3 | 5 | 3 | 4 | 4 | 2 | 1 | ♦ | ♦ | ♦ | ♦ | ♦ | ♦ | ♦ |
| SC Germania List | 2 | ♦ | 2 | ♦ | 1 | ♦ | 2 | 2 | **1** | ♦ | ♦ | 2 | **1** | 5 | 7 | 6 | 3 | 2 | ♦ | ♦ | ♦ | ♦ | ♦ | ♦ | ♦ |
| Hamburger RC | | 7 | 9 | 6 | 10 | | 10 | | 7 | 4 | 6 | | 7 | 8 | 8 | 10 | 9 | 4 | ♦ | 3 | ♦ | 2 | ♦ | ♦ | ♦ |
| RU Hohen Neuendorf | | | | | 11 | | 12 | | | 6 | 4 | 8 | | | 6 | 3 | 4 | 9 | | | 2 | 3 | ♦ | ♦ | ♦ |
| RC Leipzig | | | | | | | | | | | | | | | | | | | ♦ | 2 | ♦ | 1 | ♦ | 1 | ♦ |
| TSV Victoria Linden | ♦ | ♦ | ♦ | ♦ | ♦ | ♦ | ♦ | ♦ | ♦ | ♦ | ♦ | ♦ | 4 | 2 | 2 | 1 | 1 | 6 | ♦ | ♦ | ♦ | ♦ | ♦ | 3 | 1 |
| Veltener RC | | | | | | | | | | | | | | | | | | | 1 | 5 | ♦ | 7 | 2 | 5 | 1 |
| FT Adler Kiel Rugby | | | | | | | | | | | | | | | | 9 | | | | | | | | | 2 |
| USV Potsdam | 9 | | | | | | | | | | | 7 | 6 | 7 | 3 | 2 | 5 | 3 | ♦ | ♦ | ♦ | 5 | | | 2 |
| Bremen 1860 | | | | | | | | | | | | | | | | | | | 4 | 1 | 1 | 6 | 2 | 6 | 3 |
| Berliner RC II | | | | | | | | | | | | | | | | 8 | 8 | 10 | | | | | 1 | 7 | 3 |
| SG SV Odin/VfR Döhren ^{4} | | | | | | | | | | | | | | | 5 | 5 | 6 | | | | | | 4 | 1 | 4 |
| RC Dresden | | | | | | | | | | | | | | | | | | | 3 | 2 | 3 | 3 | 5 | 3 | 4 |
| DRC Hannover | ♦ | ♦ | ♦ | ♦ | ♦ | ♦ | ♦ | ♦ | ♦ | ♦ | ♦ | ♦ | ♦ | ♦ | ♦ | 7 | 7 | 5 | | | 2 | 8 | 5 | 5 | 5 |
| USV Jena | | | | | | | | | | | | | | | | | | | 5 | 7 | 5 | 4 | 3 | 4 | 5 |
| DSV 78 Hannover II | | | | | | | | | | | | | | | | | | | 1 | 1 | 4 | 2 | 1 | 2 | 6 |
| Berliner SC | | | | | | | | | | | | | | | | | | | 6 | 6 | 4 | 5 | 4 | 6 | 6 |
| Welfen Braunschweig | | | | | 12 | | 11 | | | | | | | | | | | 8 | 3 | 3 | 3 | 1 | 3 | 2 | 7 |
| USV Halle | | | | | | | | | | | | | | | | | | | | | | | 6 | 7 | 7 |
| SC Siemensstadt | 4 | 1 | 4 | 3 | 4 | 3 | 6 | 5 | 8 | | 8 | | | | | | 10 | | 2 | 6 | 1 | 4 | ♦ | ♦ | |
| Berliner SV 92 Rugby | 7 | 6 | 10 | | | | | | | | | | | 9 | 9 | | | 7 | ♦ | ♦ | ♦ | ♦ | ♦ | 4 | |
| 08 Ricklingen/Wunstorf | | | | | | | | | | | | | | | | | | | 2 | 4 | ♦ | ♦ | | | |
| Union 60 Bremen | | | | | | | | | | | | | | | | | | | 6 | 4 | 5 | 6 | | | |
| FC St. Pauli II | | | | | | | | | | | | | | | | | | | 5 | 5 | | | | | |
| SG Grizzlies/Potsdam | | | | | | | | | | | | | | | | | | | 4 | 8 | | | | | |
| DSV 78/08 Ricklingen ^{1} | | | | | | | | | | ♦ | **1** | ♦ | ♦ | 4 | 1 | | | | | | | | | | |
| SG Schwalbe/DRC Hannover II ^{3} | | | | | | | | | | | | | | | 10 | | | | | | | | | | |
| SV Odin Hannover ^{4} | ♦ | 5 | 11 | | | | | | | | 5 | 4 | 3 | 6 | | | | | | | | | | | |
| Stahl Brandenburg Rugby | | | | | 9 | 6 | 9 | 8 | | | | 5 | 8 | | | | | | | | | | | | |
| Stahl Hennigsdorf Rugby | 5 | 2 | 5 | 2 | 2 | ♦ | 4 | 3 | 4 | 3 | 3 | 6 | | | | | | | | | | | | | |
| VfR Döhren ^{4} | 3 | 4 | 3 | ♦ | 5 | ♦ | 5 | 7 | 5 | 2 | 7 | | | | | | | | | | | | | | |
| FC Schwalbe Hannover ^{3} | | | | | | | | | | 7 | | | | | | | | | | | | | | | |
| Post SV Berlin Rugby ^{2} | | | 8 | 4 | 7 | 2 | 3 | **1** | 2 | | | | | | | | | | | | | | | | |
| SV 1908 Ricklingen ^{1} | 6 | 3 | 6 | 5 | 8 | 4 | 8 | 4 | 6 | | | | | | | | | | | | | | | | |
| Hamburg Exiles RFC | | | 12 | | | | | | | | | | | | | | | | | | | | | | |

- ^{1} DSV 78 Hannover and SV 08 Ricklingen fielded a combined team, the DSV 78/08 Ricklingen, from 2003 to 2009.
- ^{2} Post SV Berlin Rugby left the Post SV Berlin club in 2003 to form RK 03 Berlin.
- ^{3} The SG Schwalbe/DRC Hannover II was a combined team of FC Schwalbe Hannover and the reserve team of DRC Hannover for the 2008-09 season.
- ^{4} SV Odin Hannover and VfR Döhren field a combined team, the SG SV Odin/VfR Döhren, from 2008 onwards.

=== South/West ===
| **Club** | **99** | | **00** | | **01** | | **02** | **03** | **04** | **05** | **06** | **07** | **08** | **09** | **10** | **11** | **12** | **13** | | **14** | | **15** | | **16** |
| **Club** | **A** | **S** | **A** | **S** | **A** | **S** | **02** | **03** | **04** | **05** | **06** | **07** | **08** | **09** | **10** | **11** | **12** | **I** | **II** | **I** | **II** | **I** | **II** | **16** |
| Heidelberger RK | ♦ | 3 | ♦ | 5 | 5 | 7 | 3 | 2 | 2 | **1** | ♦ | ♦ | ♦ | ♦ | ♦ | ♦ | ♦ | ♦ | ♦ | ♦ | ♦ | ♦ | ♦ | ♦ |
| SC 1880 Frankfurt | | 6 | 6 | 9 | 4 | 8 | 5 | 6 | 8 | | **1** | ♦ | ♦ | ♦ | ♦ | ♦ | ♦ | ♦ | ♦ | ♦ | ♦ | ♦ | ♦ | ♦ |
| RK Heusenstamm | ♦ | 2 | ♦ | 4 | 1 | 5 | 4 | 3 | 4 | 2 | 2 | **1** | ♦ | ♦ | ♦ | ♦ | ♦ | ♦ | ♦ | ♦ | ♦ | ♦ | ♦ | ♦ |
| TV Pforzheim | | 10 | | | | | | | | | | | | | | **1** | ♦ | ♦ | ♦ | ♦ | ♦ | ♦ | ♦ | ♦ |
| ASV Köln Rugby | ♦ | ♦ | ♦ | 2 | ♦ | 3 | 2 | 4 | 7 | 4 | 4 | 2 | **1** | 2 | ♦ | 6 | 4 | ♦ | ♦ | ♦ | ♦ | ♦ | ♦ | ♦ |
| TSV Handschuhsheim | ♦ | 1 | ♦ | ♦ | ♦ | ♦ | ♦ | ♦ | ♦ | ♦ | ♦ | ♦ | ♦ | ♦ | ♦ | ♦ | ♦ | ♦ | 1 | ♦ | ♦ | ♦ | ♦ | ♦ |
| Rugby Club Luxembourg | | | | | | | | | | | | | | | 3 | 2 | 3 | ♦ | | | | 1 | 3 | 1 |
| München RFC | | 4 | 3 | 3 | ♦ | 2 | **1** | ♦ | 3 | 3 | 3 | 6 | 5 | 4 | 2 | 3 | 7 | 2 | 4 | 2 | 3 | 3 | 1 | 1 |
| RC Aachen | | | | 8 | 6 | 10 | | | | | | 7 | | | | | 9 | ♦ | 5 | ♦ | 4 | ♦ | 4 | 2 |
| StuSta München | | | | | | | | | | 8 | 8 | 9 | 6 | 6 | 6 | 10 | | 1 | 3 | 3 | 1 | 2 | 5 | 2 |
| TGS Hausen | | | | | | | | | | | | | | | | | | | | | | 2 | 6 | 3 |
| Heidelberger TV ^{5} | | 5 | 2 | 6 | 3 | 4 | 6 | 5 | 6 | 6 | 7 | 4 | 7 | | | | 2 | ♦ | 2 | ♦ | 1 | ♦ | 1 | 3 |
| TG 75 Darmstadt | | | | | | | | | | | | | | | | | | | | | | | | 4 |
| TSV Handschuhsheim II | | | | | | | | | | | 5 | 5 | 3 | 5 | 7 | 4 | 8 | | | 1 | 5 | 5 | 2 | 4 |
| TuS 95 Düsseldorf | | 7 | 4 | 10 | | 9 | 7 | 8 | | | | | | | | | | 1 | 6 | ♦ | 7 | 3 | 4 | 5 |
| Neckarsulmer SU | | | | | | | | | | | | | | | | | | 4 | 1 | 6 | 2 | 4 | 3 | 5 |
| Eintracht Frankfurt Rugby | | 12 | | | | 11 | | | | | | | | | | | | 5 | 6 | 2 | 8 | 6 | 5 | 6 |
| RC Rottweil | | | | | | | | | | | | | | | | | | | | 1 | 2 | 1 | 2 | 6 |
| Stuttgarter RC | | | | | | | | | | | | | 2 | 9 | **1** | 9 | | 5 | 3 | 4 | 3 | 6 | 6 | 7 |
| RC Regensburg | | | | | | | | | | | | | | | | | | | | | | | | 8 |
| RC Mainz | | | | | | | | 7 | | | | | 9 | 7 | 9 | | 6 | ♦ | ♦ | ♦ | 6 | 5 | 7 | |
| RC Bonn Rhein-Sieg | | 8 | 1 | 1 | ♦ | 6 | | | | | | | | | | | | 4 | 4 | 3 | 4 | 4 | 8 | |
| Freiburger RC | | | | | | | | | | | | | | | | | | 3 | 2 | 5 | 5 | | | |
| TSV 1846 Nürnberg | | | | | | 12 | | | | | | | | | | | | 6 | 7 | 4 | 6 | | | |
| Wiedenbrücker TV | | 11 | | | | | | | | | | | | | | | | 3 | 5 | | | | | |
| SC 1880 Frankfurt II | | | | | | | | | | | | 3 | 4 | **1** | 5 | 7 | **1** | 6 | 8 | | | | | |
| Ramstein Rogues RUFC | | | | | | | | | | | | | | | | | | 2 | | | | | | |
| Heidelberger RK II | | | | | | | | | | | | | | 8 | 8 | 5 | 5 | | | | | | | |
| RG Heidelberg II | | | | | | | | | | 5 | 6 | 7 | 8 | 3 | 4 | 8 | | | | | | | | |
| Karlsruher SV Rugby | | | | 12 | | | | | 5 | 9 | | | | | 10 | | | | | | | | | |
| SG Heidelberger TV/SC Neuenheim II ^{5} | | | | | | | | | | | | | | 10 | | | | | | | | | | |
| RU Marburg | | | | | | | | | | | | 9 | | | | | | | | | | | | |
| BSC Offenbach | | 9 | 5 | 7 | 2 | 1 | ♦ | **1** | **1** | 7 | 9 | | | | | | | | | | | | | |
| RFC Illesheim | | | | 11 | | | | | | | | | | | | | | | | | | | | |

- ^{5} The SG Heidelberger TV/SC Neuenheim II was a combined team of Heidelberger TV and the reserve team of SC Neuenheim for the 2008-09 season.

=== Key ===
| Team played in Rugby-Bundesliga | Promotion round to the Rugby-Bundesliga | Relegation round to the Rugby-Regionalliga |

== See also ==
- Rugby union in Germany
- German rugby union cup
