= SC Germania List =

German rugby union club, based in Hanover

(Germany) SC Germania List
- Full name: Sport Club Germania List Hannover e.V. 1900
- Union: German Rugby Federation
- Founded: 1900
- Location: Hanover, Germany
- Ground: Sportplatz Schneckenburgerstrasse
- Chairman: Ernst Klaus
- Coach(es): Danny Stephens, Rainer Kumm, Jakob Clasen
- Captain: Stefan Mau
- League: Rugby-Bundesliga
- 2015–16: Rugby-Bundesliga North/East, 2nd
1st kit	2nd kit

Official website
- www.sc-germania-list.de

The SC Germania List is a German rugby union club from the district List of Hanover, currently playing in the Rugby-Bundesliga. Apart from rugby, the club also offers other sports like tennis, gymnastics and handball.

The club has three German rugby union championship to its name, won in 1977, 1979 and 1981.

== History ==
Germania List was formed in 1900. The club did however not make a serious impact on national level until 1942, when it reached the final of the national championship and lost. It repeated this effort in 1949, when it made another losing finals appearance, this time against SC Neuenheim.

The club's greatest era came in the late 1970s and early 80s, when it reached and won three championship finals, in 1977, 1979 and 1981, beating the Heidelberger RK twice and the Heidelberger TV once in the final.

In recent seasons, the club was part of the Rugby-Bundesliga's North/East division until 2001, when the league was restructured to a single-division format. It won its last national men's title to date in 2000, when it took out the German cup.

Germania earned promotion back to the Rugby-Bundesliga within two seasons in 2003, after winning their division, by beating South/West champions BSC Offenbach 22-14 in the 2nd Bundesliga final. It lasted at this level for only two seasons before suffering relegation back to the second division again in 2005.

The club missed out on Bundesliga promotion in 2007 when it lost the 2nd Bundesliga final 10-52 to RK Heusenstamm. Since then, the club's performances have declined to a point where it is not a promotion contender anymore.

A league reform in 2012 allowed the club promotion to the Bundesliga as the league was expanded from ten to 24 teams. Germania finished third in their group in the 2012-13 season and qualified for the north/east division of the championship round, where it came fifth. The club was knocked out in the first round of the play-offs after losing 103–10 to RG Heidelberg.

In 2013–14 the team qualified for the championship round and the play-offs once more, losing 31–22 to TSV Handschuhsheim in the first round. In the 2014–15 season the club finished third in the north-east championship group but was knocked out of the first round of the play-offs after a 20–24 loss to TSV Handschuhsheim. In the 2015–16 season List came second in the north/east division of the Rugby-Bundesliga but lost to Heidelberger RK in the semi-finals of the play-off.

== Club honours ==
=== Men ===
- German rugby union championship
  - Champions: 1977, 1979, 1981
  - Runners up: 1942, 1949
- German rugby union cup
  - Winner: 1968, 1971, 1977, 1980, 2000
- 2nd Rugby-Bundesliga North/East
  - Champions: 2003, 2007
  - Runners up: 2002, 2006

=== Women ===
- German rugby union championship
  - Runners up: 2003, 2006
- German sevens championship
  - Champions: 2003, 2004
  - Runners up: 2006

== Recent seasons ==
Recent seasons of the club:

=== Men ===
Year	Division	Position
1997-98	2nd Rugby-Bundesliga North/East (II)	2nd — Promoted
1998-99	Rugby-Bundesliga North/East (I)	5th
1998-99	Bundesliga qualification round	2nd
1999–2000	Rugby-Bundesliga North/East	4th
1999–2000	Bundesliga qualification round	1st
2000-01	Rugby-Bundesliga North/East	4th
2000-01	Bundesliga qualification round	2nd — Relegated
2001-02	2nd Rugby-Bundesliga North/East (II)	2nd
2002-03	2nd Rugby-Bundesliga North/East	1st — Promoted
2003-04	Rugby-Bundesliga (I)	7th
2004-05	Rugby-Bundesliga	8th — Relegated
2005-06	2nd Rugby-Bundesliga North/East (II)	2nd
2006–07	2nd Rugby-Bundesliga North/East	1st
2007–08	2nd Rugby-Bundesliga North/East	5th
2008–09	2nd Rugby-Bundesliga North/East	7th
2009–10	2nd Rugby-Bundesliga North/East (II)	6th
2010–11	2nd Rugby-Bundesliga North/East	3rd
2011–12	2nd Rugby-Bundesliga North/East	2nd — Promoted
2012–13	Rugby-Bundesliga qualification round – North	3rd
2012–13	Rugby-Bundesliga championship round – North-East	5th — Round of sixteen
2013–14	Rugby-Bundesliga qualification round – North	3rd
2013–14	Rugby-Bundesliga championship round – North-East	4th — First round
2014–15	Rugby-Bundesliga qualification round – North	2nd
2014–15	Rugby-Bundesliga championship round – North-East	3rd – First round
2015–16	Rugby-Bundesliga North-East	2nd — Semi finals

- Until 2001, when the single-division Bundesliga was established, the season was divided in autumn and spring, a Vorrunde and Endrunde, whereby the top teams of the Rugby-Bundesliga would play out the championship while the bottom teams together with the autumn 2nd Bundesliga champion would play for Bundesliga qualification. The remainder of the 2nd Bundesliga teams would play a spring round to determine the relegated clubs. Where two placing's are shown, the first is autumn, the second spring. In 2012 the Bundesliga was expanded from ten to 24 teams and the 2nd Bundesliga from 20 to 24 with the leagues divided into four regional divisions.

=== Women ===
Year	Division	Position
2002-03	Women's Rugby Bundesliga (I)	2nd — Runners up
2003-04	Women's Rugby Bundesliga	2nd
2004-05	Women's Rugby Bundesliga	4th
2005-06	Women's Rugby Bundesliga	2nd — Runners up
2006–07	Women's Rugby Bundesliga	3rd
2007–08	Women's Rugby Bundesliga	4th
2008–09	Women's Rugby Bundesliga	5th
2009–10	Women's Rugby Bundesliga	5th
2010–11	Women's Rugby Bundesliga	5th
2011–12	Women's Rugby Bundesliga	5th
2012–13	Women's Rugby Bundesliga	2nd
2013–14	Women's Rugby Bundesliga	6th
2014–15	Women's Rugby Bundesliga	4th
2015–16	Women's Rugby Bundesliga	5th

== Rugby internationals ==
The club had two players selected for the German under-18 team at the 2009 European Under-18 Rugby Union Championship, these being Fabian Tacke and Kevin Nelson. Both also played at the 2010 tournament, as did Kevin Riege from the club.
