= SV Odin Hannover =

German rugby union club, based in Hanover

(Germany) SV Odin Hannover
- Full name: SV Odin von 1905 e.V.
- Union: German Rugby Federation
- Founded: 1905; 121 years ago
- Location: Hanover, Germany
- Ground: An der Graft
- Chairman: Armand Pampows
- Coach: Antonio Joao Carvalho Abreu
- League: 2.Rugby-Bundesliga
Team kit

Official website
- www.sv-odin.de

The SV Odin Hannover is a German rugby union club from Hanover, currently playing in the 2. Rugby-Bundesliga. Apart from rugby, the club also offers other sports like association football, gymnastics and handball.

The club has six German rugby union championship to its name, won in 1914, 1920, 1930, 1931, 1961 and 1963.

== History ==
The club was formed as a rugby union club in 1905. The club was an early power house of German rugby, reaching the second-ever German championship final, but losing to FC 1880 Frankfurt.

It was to be the only championship final the club lost, winning the next six it played in between 1914 and 1963. The club also became the first-ever winner of the German rugby union cup in 1962 and defended this title the following year. The double of championship and cup won that year however was to become its last national titles until 2009. Two more lost cup finals in the late 1960s marking the end of the club's success on national scale.

In recent seasons, after having been relegated from the Rugby-Bundesliga in 1998, the club made a comeback to the national rugby scene when it returned to the 2nd Rugby-Bundesliga, the second tier of German rugby, in 2004. The club remained a mid-table side in the league the following seasons. In 2008, it formed an on-the-field union with VfR Döhren, the two clubs now fielding a combined side in the league, playing as SG SV Odin/VfR Döhren.

In 2009, the combined side managed to win the league cup, a competition not contested by the top teams of German rugby.

The SG SV Odin/VfR Döhren was withdrawn from the 2nd Bundesliga in 2011 and instead entered the tier-three Regionalliga North for the following season. In the 2013–14 season the club made it back to the 2nd Rugby-Bundesliga. In the 2014–15 season the club finished third in the north-east Liga-Pokal group and was knocked out by Neckarsulmer SU in the quarter-finals of the play-offs.

In the 2016–2017 season they went unbeaten in the 2. Rugby-Bundesliga and beat RK Berlin Grizzlies to win the first promotion spot to the 1. Rugby-Bundesliga for the 2017–2018 season.

In the 2017–2018 season and after a good start they ended the first leg in the middle of the table. After the winter break they did not manage to win a single game and ended the season in the last place returning to the 2. Rugby-Bundesliga.

== Club honours ==
- German rugby union championship
  - Champions: 1914, 1920, 1930, 1931, 1961, 1963
  - Runners up: 1910
- German rugby union cup
  - Winner: 1962, 1963
  - Runners up: 1967, 1968
- German rugby union league cup
  - Winner: 2009
  - Runners up: 1989

== Recent seasons ==
Recent seasons of the club:

Year	Division	Position				
2000-01	Rugby-Regionalliga Lower Saxony (III)	5th				
2000-01	Rugby-Regionalliga Lower Saxony (III)	3rd				
2001-02	Rugby-Regionalliga Lower Saxony	3rd				
2002-03	Rugby-Regionalliga Lower Saxony	3rd				
2003-04	Rugby-Regionalliga Lower Saxony	1st				
2003-04	North/East championship round	1st — Promoted				
2004-05	2nd Rugby-Bundesliga North/East (II)	5th				
2005-06	2nd Rugby-Bundesliga North/East	4th				
2006–07	2nd Rugby-Bundesliga North/East	3rd				
2007–08	2nd Rugby-Bundesliga North/East	6th				
2008–09	2nd Rugby-Bundesliga North/East ^{1}	5th				
2009–10	2nd Rugby-Bundesliga North/East ^{1}	5th				
2010–11	2nd Rugby-Bundesliga North/East	6th — Relegated				
2011–12	Rugby-Regionalliga North	8th				
2012–13	Rugby-Regionalliga North	3rd				
2013–14	Rugby-Regionalliga North	1st — Promoted				
2014–15	2nd Rugby-Bundesliga qualification round – North	3rd				
2014–15	Liga-Pokal – North-East	1st — Quarter finals				
2015–16	2nd Rugby-Bundesliga North	4th	2016-17	2nd Rugby-Bundesliga North	1st	1. Rugby-Bundesliga

- ^{1} Placing for combined side SG SV Odin/VfR Döhren.
- Until 2001, when the single-division Bundesliga was established, the season was divided in autumn and spring, a Vorrunde and Endrunde, whereby the top teams of the Rugby-Bundesliga would play out the championship while the bottom teams together with the autumn 2nd Bundesliga champion would play for Bundesliga qualification. The remainder of the 2nd Bundesliga teams would play a spring round to determine the relegated clubs. Where two placing's are shown, the first is autumn, the second spring.
