= RC Mainz =

German rugby union club

(Germany) Rugby Club Mainz
- Full name: Rugby Club Mainz e.V.
- Union: German Rugby Federation
- Founded: 1999; 27 years ago
- Location: Mainz, Germany
- Coach(es): Jörg Barthel, Alexis Vitrey
- Captain: Bruno Pairet
- League: 3. Liga Süd/West
- 2015–16: 5th

Official website
- www.rcmainz.de

The RC Mainz is a German rugby union club from Mainz, currently playing in the Rugby-Bundesliga.

== History ==
Rugby in Mainz dates back to 1997, when a rugby department was formed in the 1. FC Vorwärts Orient Mainz. Two years later, in 1999, this rugby department formed the current RC Mainz.

The club competed at the third tier of German club rugby at the time, the Rugby-Regionalliga. Oddly, it took part in two of the Regionalligas local divisions, Hesse and Rhineland-Palatinate. The city of Mainz is located in Rhineland-Palatinate, but just across the river from Hesse.

In the 2001-02 season, the club celebrated its first success, promotion to the 2nd Rugby-Bundesliga. In this league, it was able to survive for only one season, being promptly relegated back to the third division again.

The team achieved promotion to the 2nd Bundesliga once more when it won the Regionalliga Rhineland-Palatinate, as well as the Regionalliga Hesse. The club was saved from relegation after its first season there when the league was enlarged and has since improved in its performance.

The club suffered relegation in 2010 but bounced straight back, finishing runners-up in the new 3rd Liga South/West and returning to the 2nd Bundesliga.

A league reform in 2012 allowed the club promotion to the Bundesliga after the league was expanded from ten to 24 teams. RC finished third in their group in the 2012-13 season and qualified for the south/west division of the championship round, where it came eighth. The club was knocked out in the first round of the play-offs after losing 131–3 to DSV 78 Hannover.

The club qualified for the play-offs to the DRV-Pokal in 2013–14, the second-tier competition in German rugby, where it was knocked out by SG Siemensstadt/Grizzlies in the first round. For the 2014–15 season the club entered the 2nd Rugby-Bundesliga but was only able to qualify for the Liga-Pokal round where it came seventh and missed out on the play-offs. Mainz dropped back to the third tier for the following season.

== Club honours ==
- Rugby-Regionalliga Rhineland-Palatinate
  - Champions: 2002, 2004, 2007
- Rugby-Regionalliga Hessen
  - Champions: 2007

== Recent seasons ==
Recent seasons of the club:

Year	Division	Position
2001-02	Rugby-Regionalliga Rhineland-Palatinate (III)	1st — Promoted
2002-03	2nd Rugby-Bundesliga South/West (II)	7th — Relegated
2003-04	Rugby-Regionalliga Rhineland-Palatinate (III)	1st
2004-05	Rugby-Regionalliga Rhineland-Palatinate	
2005-06	Rugby-Regionalliga Rhineland-Palatinate/Hesse (III)	2nd
2006–07	Rugby-Regionalliga Rhineland-Palatinate; Rugby-Regionalliga Hesse	1st — Promoted
2007–08	2nd Rugby-Bundesliga South/West (II)	9th
2008–09	2nd Rugby-Bundesliga South/West	7th
2009–10	2nd Rugby-Bundesliga South/West	9th — Relegated
2010-11	3rd Liga South/West (III)	2nd — Promoted
2011–12	2nd Rugby-Bundesliga South/West	6th — Promoted
2012–13	Rugby-Bundesliga qualification round – West (I)	3rd
2012–13	Rugby-Bundesliga championship round – South-West	8th — Round of sixteen
2013–14	Rugby-Bundesliga qualification round – West	4th
2013–14	DRV-Pokal – South-West	6th — First round
2014–15	2nd Rugby-Bundesliga qualification round – West	5th
2014–15	Liga-Pokal – South-West	7th — Relegated
2015–16	3rd Liga South/West—South (III)	5th

- Until 2001, when the single-division Bundesliga was established, the season was divided in autumn and spring, a Vorrunde and Endrunde, whereby the top teams of the Rugby-Bundesliga would play out the championship while the bottom teams together with the autumn 2nd Bundesliga champion would play for Bundesliga qualification. The remainder of the 2nd Bundesliga teams would play a spring round to determine the relegated clubs. Where two placing's are shown, the first is autumn, the second spring. In 2012 the Bundesliga was expanded from ten to 24 teams and the 2nd Bundesliga from 20 to 24 with the leagues divided into four regional divisions.
