= FV 1897 Linden =

German rugby union club, based in Hanover

(Germany) FV 1897 Linden
- Full name: Fussball Verein 1897 Linden e.V.
- Union: German Rugby Federation
- Founded: 1897; 129 years ago
- Location: Hanover, Germany
- Chairman: Albert Kumm

Official website
- www.linden1897.de

The FV 1897 Linden is a German rugby union club from Hanover. As well as rugby, the club also offers other sports, such as American football and gymnastics.

The club has four German rugby union championships to its name, won in 1932, 1937, 1940 and 1978 but has not appeared in a championship final since 1980.

In recent seasons, the club has not fielded a team in competitive senior rugby.

== History ==
FV 1897 Linden was formed on 2 September 1897 as a football club. In March 1898, the club then switched codes and adopted rugby as its sport instead but retained its name Fussball Verein.

FV made its first trip to a German championship final in 1932, defeating RG Heidelberg 6-5. It lost the 1934 final to fellow Hanover club VfR Döhren before winning its second title, again beating RG Heidelberg, in 1937.

A third championship was won in 1940, during the Second World War, when Eintracht Frankfurt Rugby was defeated 19-6.

It took the club 38 years to appear in another final, when, in 1978, TSV Handschuhsheim was beaten 24-16 and FV's fourth and so far last championship was won. It made one more finals appearance, in 1980, but this time RG Heidelberg triumphed 16-10. In between those two finals, it appeared in the 1979 German rugby union cup final, where it lost to DSV 78 Hannover.

The club has since disappeared from the Rugby-Bundesliga and not fielded a side in competitive senior rugby, but continues to be listed as a member of the Lower Saxony Rugby Federation.

== Club honours ==
- German rugby union championship
  - Champions: 1932, 1937, 1940, 1978
  - Runners up: 1934, 1980
- German rugby union cup
  - Runners up: 1979
