= Rugby-Bundesliga =

German 1st tier rugby union competition

- Current season, competition or edition: 2026–27 Rugby-Bundesliga
- Sport: Rugby union
- Founded: 1971; 55 years ago
- Administrator: DRV
- No. of teams: 10
- Country: Germany
- Most recent champion: SC 1880 Frankfurt (8th title) (2025–26)
- Most titles: Heidelberger RK (11 titles)
- Level on pyramid: 1
- Relegation to: 2. Rugby-Bundesliga

The Rugby-Bundesliga is the highest level of the league system for rugby union in Germany, organised by the German Rugby Federation.

The league has a mix of professional, semi-professional and amateur players, with four club in the league being officially professional outfits.

From 2012 to 2015 the Bundesliga was expanded from ten to 24 and the league divided into four regional divisions of six teams each. Below the Bundesliga the 2. Bundesliga was organised in a similar fashion. From 2015 onwards the league returned to sixteen clubs.

== History ==
Location of teams in the Rugby-Bundesliga 2024-25

The German rugby championship was first played in 1909 and, with the exception of 2002, has always been determined by a final.

The Rugby-Bundesliga was first played in two divisions in the 1971-72 season and soon consisted of six teams in the North and ten teams in the South. However, of the eight southern teams, five were located in Heidelberg and after 1975 all northern teams were from Hanover. The founding members of the league were SV Odin Hannover, SV 1908 Ricklingen, DSV 1878 Hannover, TSV Victoria Linden, SC Siemensstadt and FC St. Pauli Rugby in the north and SC Neuenheim, RG Heidelberg, Heidelberger RK, Heidelberger TV, TSV Handschuhsheim, RC Hürth, Bonner SC, ASV Köln Rugby, SC 1880 Frankfurt and Eintracht Frankfurt Rugby.

The league has changed its format a number of times over the years. In 1997-98, it played as a single-division league with eight teams. From 1998 to 2001, it was divided into two regional divisions again. The top-three teams from each of the two divisions then qualified for the finals round, held in a home-and-away format. The top two teams out of this round then played the German Final in a home-and-away format. The bottom three teams in each division played a spring round together with the top three teams of the 2nd Rugby-Bundesliga to determine the clubs who would play in the Bundesliga in the next season.

Since 2001, the Bundesliga has been organised as a single division again with eight teams playing each other in a home-and-away season. The top two teams play each other in the championship final. In its first season, 2001–02, no final was held and the regular season winner was also the German champions. In the first 34 editions of the Final, there was always a team from Hanover present. Only in 2006 did this stop, and no team from Hanover has played in the final since.

Below the Bundesliga, two 2nd Bundesligas, north and south, form the second tier of the league system, with the winners promoted to the Bundesliga. The third tier of rugby is formed by the nine Regionalligen, regional leagues.

SC 1880 Frankfurt, the 2007-08 champions, had to wait 83 years for its fifth title, having last won the championship in 1925.

On 19 July 2008 at the annual general meeting of the German rugby association, the DRV decided to expand the Bundesliga and slightly change its modus. It was decided to expand the league to nine teams for 2008-09 and ten teams for 2009-10, meaning only one club will be relegated in 2009, and two promoted. Also, the play-off format was changed, with four teams qualifying for the finals. At the bottom end, in 2008-09, the last two teams would determine one relegated club via playoff. From 2009-10, the bottom four clubs will play-off to determine two relegated teams.

The women's Rugby-Bundesliga consists of six teams in 2008 and also plays a final between the top two clubs at the end of the season.

As a sign of the gap between the Bundesliga and the 2nd Bundesliga, TSV Victoria Linden, who only won the 2009-10 North/East division in the last round of the championship, declined promotion, citing the additional cost of travelling and the limited player pool as their reason. The South/West champion, Stuttgarter RC, has also indicated that it would not take up promotion, leaving the Bundesliga with only eight clubs for the next season. It also meant, for the first time ever, that no club from Hanover would compete at the top level of German rugby. DSV 78 protested the decision to reduce the league to eight teams again and thereby relegating the club. The annual convention of the German Rugby Federation however decided in early July 2010 to allow DSV 78 to stay in the Bundesliga.

In February 2011, the DRV decided that the league would continue to play with ten teams in the near future.

In mid-July 2012 the Deutsche Rugby Tag, the annual general meeting of the DRV decided to approve a league reform proposed by German international Manuel Wilhelm. The new system saw the number of clubs in the Bundesliga increased from ten to 24, the league divided into four regional divisions of six clubs each and the finals series expanded from four to sixteen teams. One of the main aims of the reform was to reduce the number of kilometres travelled by individual teams and therefore reduce the travel expenses. The system will remain mostly unchanged for the 2013-14 season. The only changes will be a play-off between the fourth and fifth placed teams in each group after the first stage to determine the clubs advancing to the second stage. The championship play-offs after the second stage will be reduced from sixteen to twelve clubs with the top two teams in each group advancing directly to the quarter-finals while the remaining eight will play a wild card round to determine the other four quarter finalists.

At the annual general meeting of the DRV in July 2015 it was decided to return to a sixteen club format with two regional divisions of eight. The last placed in each division would be relegated while the seventh placed teams would have to play-off against the third and fourth best team of the 2. Bundesliga. The German championship in turn will be contested by the best two teams in each group.

== Clubs participating in 2026-27 Season ==
- Berliner RC
- SC Frankfurt 1880
- SC Germania List
- TSV Handschuhsheim
- DSV 78 Hannover
- RG Heidelberg
- Heidelberger Ruderklub
- RC Luxembourg
- München RFC
- SC Neuenheim

== Championship finals ==
The German rugby champions are determined by a final (except in 2001-02), currently contested by the two top teams of the Bundesliga:

=== Finals ===
Season	Winner	Runner–Up	Result
1971–72	TSV Victoria Linden	SC Neuenheim	17–16
1972–73	Heidelberger RK	SV 08 Ricklingen	3–0
1973–74	SV 08 Ricklingen	Heidelberger TV	15–9
1974–75	TSV Victoria Linden	Heidelberger RK	12–4
1975–76	Heidelberger RK	TSV Victoria Linden	35–0
1976–77	SC Germania List	Heidelberger RK	16–9
1977–78	FV 1897 Linden	TSV Handschuhsheim	24–16
1978–79	SC Germania List	Heidelberger TV	9–0
1979–80	RG Heidelberg	FV 1897 Linden	16–10
1980–81	SC Germania List	Heidelberger RK	28–19
1981–82	DSV 78 Hannover	RG Heidelberg	15–6
1982–83	DSV 78 Hannover	RG Heidelberg	16–12
1983–84	DSV 78 Hannover	TSV Victoria Linden	27–6
1984–85	DSV 78 Hannover	RG Heidelberg	24–9
1985–86	Heidelberger RK	DSV 1878 Hannover	15–9
1986–87	TSV Victoria Linden	DSV 1878 Hannover	24–0
1987–88	DRC Hannover	DSV 1878 Hannover	12–9
1988–89	TSV Victoria Linden	Berliner RC	20–6
1989–90	DSV 78 Hannover	SC Neuenheim	31–4
1990–91	DSV 78 Hannover	TSV Victoria Linden	6–3
1991–92	TSV Victoria Linden	SV 08 Ricklingen	59–3
1992–93	TSV Victoria Linden	DSV 1878 Hannover	18–14
1993–94	TSV Victoria Linden	Heidelberger TV	15–3
1994–95	SC Neuenheim	TSV Victoria Linden	14–13
1995–96	TSV Victoria Linden	RG Heidelberg	9–8
1996–97	RG Heidelberg	TSV Victoria Linden	15–13
1997–98	DRC Hannover	TSV Victoria Linden	25–20
1998–99	DRC Hannover	RG Heidelberg	24–10 / 11–22
1999–2000	DRC Hannover	TSV Victoria Linden	45–12 / 34–3
2000–01	DRC Hannover	SC Neuenheim	28–16 / 8–13
2001–02	DRC Hannover	RG Heidelberg	not held
2002–03	SC Neuenheim	DRC Hannover	18–9
2003–04	SC Neuenheim	DRC Hannover	23–18
2004–05	DRC Hannover	TSV Handschuhsheim	21–9
2005–06	RG Heidelberg	SC Neuenheim	13–9
2006–07	RG Heidelberg	SC 1880 Frankfurt	23–15
2007–08	SC 1880 Frankfurt	RG Heidelberg	28–13
2008–09	SC 1880 Frankfurt	Heidelberger RK	11–8
2009–10	Heidelberger RK	SC 1880 Frankfurt	39–22
2010–11	Heidelberger RK	SC 1880 Frankfurt	12–9
2011–12	Heidelberger RK	TV Pforzheim	20–16
2012–13	Heidelberger RK	SC Neuenheim	41–10
2013–14	Heidelberger RK	TV Pforzheim	43–20
2014–15	Heidelberger RK	TV Pforzheim	53–27
2015–16	TV Pforzheim	Heidelberger RK	41–36
2016–17	Heidelberger RK	TV Pforzheim	39–35
2017–18	Heidelberger RK	RG Heidelberg	47–12
2018–19	SC 1880 Frankfurt	TSV Handschuhsheim	22–12
2019–20	Canceled due to COVID-19		
2020–21	Canceled due to COVID-19		
2021–22	SC 1880 Frankfurt	TSV Handschuhsheim	29–17
2022–23	SC 1880 Frankfurt	SC Neuenheim	30-16
2023–24	SC 1880 Frankfurt	SC Neuenheim	20–14
2024–25	SC 1880 Frankfurt	TSV Handschuhsheim	43–5
2025–26	SC 1880 Frankfurt	SC Neuenheim	35–10

Source:"Die Deutschen Meister der Männer". Deutscher Rugby Verband. Archived from the original on 2007-10-25.

=== Winners & Finalists ===
As of 2026, this is the standing in the all-time winners list of the Bundesliga:

Club	Championships	Finals
Heidelberger RK	11	16
TSV Victoria Linden	8	15
DRC Hannover	7	9
DSV 78 Hannover	6	10
SC 1880 Frankfurt	8	9
RG Heidelberg	4	12
SC Neuenheim	3	11
SC Germania List	3	3
FV 1897 Linden	1	2
SV 08 Ricklingen	1	3
TV Pforzheim	1	5
Heidelberger TV	0	3
TSV Handschuhsheim	0	5
Berliner RC	0	1

== League placings ==
Since 1998, the following clubs have played in the league. From 1999 to 2001, the league consisted of two regional divisions of six teams each. After an autumn (A) round, the top three from each group would reach the championship finals round in spring (S). The bottom three, together with the top three from each of the two 2nd Bundesligas would play a promotion round in spring with the top three in each group playing in the Bundesliga the following autumn. In 1997-98 and from 2001 to 2012, the league has been played in a single-division format. From 2012–13 to 2014–15 it had been divided into a first (I) and second round (II), followed by play-offs:

Club	98	99		00		01		02	03	04	05	06	07	08	09	10	11	12	13		14		15		16	17	18	19	22	23	24	25	26
Club	98	A	S	A	S	A	S	02	03	04	05	06	07	08	09	10	11	12	I	II	I	II	I	II	16	17	18	19	22	23	24	25	26
SC 1880 Frankfurt			12										1	1	1	1	2	2	1	5	2	7	2	7	6	6	4	1	1	1	1	1	1
SC Neuenheim	2	?	4	2	3	2	1	3	2	1	4	2	4	5	3	5	5	4	2	2	5	3	4	3	4	7	8		3	2	2	3	2
RG Heidelberg	5	?	2	3	5	3	3	2	4	3	3	1	2	2	5	2	4	6	3	4	4	4	3	4	3	3	2	4	4	5	6	7	3
TSV Handschuhsheim	6	?	7	1	6	1	4	4	5	4	2	4	6	3	6	4	3	5	5		3	6	5	5	5	4	5	2	2	3	3	2	4
DSV 78 Hannover ^{1}	4	3	3	3	4	2	6	6	3							9	7	7	1	1	1	1	1	1	3	3	1	1	1	1	1	1	5
Heidelberger RK	8	?	9	5	11							6	7	6	2	3	1	1	1	1	1	1	1	1	1	1	1	3	5	8		5	6
München RFC			10		9	4	8		8																					6	4	4	7
SC Germania List		5	8	4	7	4	8			7	8								3	5	3	4	2	3	2	2	2	5	4	4	3	2	8
Berliner RC		4	7	5	9		7	7	7	5	5	7	5	4	4	6	6	9	1	2	1	2	2	4	4	4	4	2	3	2	2	4	9
RC Luxembourg																			5							8		6	7			6	10
RC Leipzig																			5		4		6		6	5	7	4	5	3	4	3	
RK 03 Berlin ^{2}											7				8	7	8	8	2	3	2	3	1	2	1	1	3	3	2	6	7	5	
Hamburger RC																			5		6		4	5	7	6	5	7	6	5	5	6	
FC St Pauli Rugby					12														2	4	2	5	3	6	5	7		8		8	6	7	
RSV Köln		?	6	4	8	6	9									10			4	7	3	8	3	8	8						8	8	
Berliner SV 92 Rugby																			4	8	3	7	5									8	
Offenbacher SCR							7	8																						4	5		
RK Heusenstamm		?	8	6	10		11							8	7	8	9	10	2	6	1	5	1	6	7	5	7	5	6	7	7		
TSV Victoria Linden	1	2	5	2	2	3	5	5	6	6	6	8							4	7	4	6	5			8				7	8		
VfR Döhren			9	6	11	6	11																				8		7				
TV Pforzheim																		3	4	3	2	2	2	2	2	2	3	7	8				
SG Siemensstadt/Grizzlies																							3	w			6	6	8				
Neckarsulmer SU																											6	8					
RU Hohen Neuendorf																							4	7	8								
RC Aachen																			6		5		4										
Heidelberger TV																			6		6		6										
08 Ricklingen/Wunstorf ^{3}																					5	8											
RC Mainz																			3	8	4												
Veltener RC																					5												
TuS 95 Düsseldorf																					6												
USV Potsdam Rugby																			3	6	6												
DRC Hannover	3	1	1	1	1	1	2	1	1	2	1	3	3	7	9																		
DSV 78/08 Ricklingen ^{1}										8		7	8																				
RC Bonn Rhein-Sieg					7	5	12																										
Post SV Berlin Rugby ^{2}							9																										
Stahl Hennigsdorf Rugby			11		8	5	10																										
SC Siemensstadt			10		10		12																										
SV 1908 Ricklingen ^{1}			12																														
SV Odin Hannover	8																																

- ^{1} DSV 78 Hannover and SV 08 Ricklingen fielded a combined team, the DSV 78/08 Ricklingen, from 2003 to 2009.
- ^{2} Post SV Berlin Rugby left Post SV in 2003 to form RK 03 Berlin.
- ^{3} TuS Wunsdorf and SV 08 Ricklingen fielded a combined team, the 08 Ricklingen/Wunsdorf, from 2012 onwards.

=== Key ===
Champions	Championship round participants

== Player statistics ==
The top try and point scorers in recent season were:

Season	Player	Tries	Player	Points
2007–08				
2008–09	(Germany) Alexander Pipa (TSV)	22	(Germany) Thorsten Wiedemann (TSV)	212
2009–10	(Germany) Alexander Pipa (TSV)	22	(Germany) Fabian Heimpel (RGH)	225
2010–11	(New Zealand) Caine Elisara (HRK)	27	(New Zealand) Keiran Manawatu (SC 1880)	282
2011–12	(New Zealand) Caine Elisara (HRK)	31	(New Zealand) Luke James Muggeridge (HRK)	234
