= 2012–13 Rugby-Bundesliga =

- Countries: Germany; Luxembourg
- Champions: Heidelberger RK (9th title)
- Runners-up: SC Neuenheim

The 2012–13 Rugby-Bundesliga was the 42nd edition of this competition and the 93rd edition of the German rugby union championship. In the Rugby-Bundesliga, twenty-two teams played in, initially, four regional divisions, the first stage of the competition. The season started on 25 August 2012 and finished with the championship final on 15 June 2013, interrupted by a winter break from 25 November to 3 March. The regular season finished on Wednesday 1 May and the play-offs started on the following weekend, 4 May, and the German championship final was held on 15 June 2013.

The defending champions were Heidelberger RK who defeated TV Pforzheim in the 2012 final to take out its eights championship and third in a row. Heidelberger RK took out the national championship once more, remaining unbeaten all season and defeating local rival SC Neuenheim 41–10 in the final.

== Overview ==
Location of teams in the Rugby-Bundesliga 2012-13

The league has been radically modified from the 2011–12 season. In 2011–12 the league operated with ten teams playing in a single division in a home-and-away format with semi-finals and a final at the end. In 2012–13 the league has been expanded, initially to twenty-four teams, which were to play in four regional divisions of six teams each. In those each team would play the others in its division just once. However, two teams resigned from the league before the start of the season, reducing the number of clubs to twenty-two. The Berlin Grizzlies of the eastern division opted to form a team with the reserve side of USV Potsdam Rugby and play in the 2nd Rugby-Bundesliga instead. DRC Hannover withdrew from the northern division just before the first game of the season, suffering from a lack of first team players and entered the tier three Rugby-Regionalliga instead for 2012–13.

The first stage of the competition, the Vorrunde, will finish on 3 October 2012 after which the second stage will start, the Qualifikationsphase, in which the top four teams each from the southern and the western group play each other in one group while the top teams from the north and east play each other in another. The finals series will be expanded from four to eight teams. The six teams not qualified for the Qualifikationsphase will enter the DRV-Pokal, the German rugby union cup, together with the top eight teams of the 2nd Bundesliga. The 2nd Bundesliga teams not qualified for the DRV-Pokal will play for the Liga Pokal.

In the second stage the teams within a group will play each other in a home-and-away format, with the teams that already played each other in the first stage carrying over those results. All sixteen clubs will qualify for the knock-out stage.

One of the main aims of the reform was to reduce the number of kilometres traveled by individual teams and therefore reduce the travel expenses. Additionally, the 2nd Bundesliga was also expanded to 24 teams.

Because of the enlargement of the league from ten to twenty-two (initially twenty-four) teams no club was relegated after the 2011–12 season but twelve clubs promoted:

- Promoted from the 2nd Bundesliga South/West: Heidelberger TV, RC Luxembourg, ASV Köln Rugby, RC Mainz, RC Aachen
- Promoted from the 2nd Bundesliga North/East: FC St. Pauli Rugby, SC Germania List, TSV Victoria Linden, Hamburger RC, Berliner SV 92, USV Potsdam Rugby (DRC Hannover withdrew before the first round due to a lack of players)
- Promoted from the Rugby-Regionalliga: RC Leipzig (Berlin Grizzlies withdrew before the start of the season)

Two clubs finished the regular season unbeaten, DSV 78 Hannover and Heidelberger RK. Of the sixteen clubs qualified for the play-offs three decided to cancel their first round match, the three bottom placed clubs in the north east, Berliner SV 92, Victoria Linden and USV Potsdam, with all three games awarded 50-0 to the opposition. The quarter finals saw the south western clubs dominate with all four advancing teams being from that division and all north eastern clubs being knocked out. The semi finals were heavily affected by bad weather, with both games, to be held in Heidelberg, being canceled and rescheduled. The final saw Heidelberger RK defeat SC Neuenheim 41–10 to take out its ninth national championship and fourth consecutive one.

== Bundesliga tables & results ==
=== First stage ===
In the first stage twenty-two clubs played in four groups. Within each group each team played the other just once. The best four teams in each group advanced to the second stage.

==== North ====
The table and results of the division:

	Club	Played	W	D	L	PF	PA	Diff	BP	Points
1	DSV 78 Hannover	4	4	0	0	319	8	311	4	20
2	FC St. Pauli Rugby	4	3	0	1	146	102	44	3	15
3	SC Germania List	4	2	0	1	81	142	–61	1	9
4	TSV Victoria Linden	4	1	0	2	44	138	–94	1	5
5	Hamburger RC	4	0	0	4	27	227	–200	0	0

- Relegated: None
- Promoted: 08 Ricklingen/Wunstorf

Club	DSV	STP	GER	VIC	HRC
DSV 78 Hannover	—	62–5		65–0	106–0
FC St. Pauli Rugby		—	43–10		
SC Germania List	3–86		—	34–0	
TSV Victoria Linden		22–33		—	22–6
Hamburger RC		8–65	13–34		—

==== East ====
The table and results of the division:

	Club	Played	W	D	L	PF	PA	Diff	BP	Points
1	Berliner Rugby Club	4	4	0	0	317	25	292	4	20
2	RK 03 Berlin	4	3	0	1	258	76	182	3	15
3	USV Potsdam Rugby	4	2	0	2	137	121	16	2	10
4	Berliner SV 92 Rugby	4	1	0	3	76	289	–213	1	5
5	RC Leipzig	4	0	0	4	16	293	–277	0	0

- Relegated: None
- Promoted: Veltener RC

Club	BRC	RKB	USV	BSV	RCL
Berliner Rugby Club	—	61–10		138–7	
RK 03 Berlin		—	42–7		116–0
USV Potsdam Rugby	5–42		—	58–27	
Berliner SV 92 Rugby		8–90		—	34–3
RC Leipzig	3–76		10–67		—

==== West ====
The table and results of the division:

	Club	Played	W	D	L	PF	PA	Diff	BP	Points
1	SC 1880 Frankfurt	5	5	0	0	264	47	217	5	25
2	RK Heusenstamm	5	4	0	1	290	43	247	5	21
3	RC Mainz	5	2	0	3	127	156	–29	2	10
4	ASV Köln Rugby	5	2	0	2	72	251	–179	2	8
5	RC Luxembourg	5	1	0	3	68	248	–180	0	2
6	RC Aachen	5	0	0	5	29	205	–176	1	1

- Relegated: RC Luxembourg (withdrawn)
- Promoted: TuS 95 Düsseldorf

Club	SCF	RKH	ASV	RCM	RCL	RCA
SC 1880 Frankfurt	—	22–20	81–0	62–15		
RK Heusenstamm		—	93–5		73–6	62–10
ASV Köln Rugby			—	38–22	0–0	29–5
RC Mainz		0–42		—	77–7	
RC Luxembourg	5–48				—	50–0
RC Aachen	7–51			7–13		—

- The game between RC Luxembourg and RC Aachen initially ended in a 21–0 win for Aachen but was later changed to a 50–0 victory for Luxembourg because RCA fielded two underaged players.
- The game between RC Luxembourg and ASV Köln Rugby was cancelled by both teams with both clubs being deducted two points.

==== South ====
The table and results of the division:

	Club	Played	W	D	L	PF	PA	Diff	BP	Points
1	Heidelberger RK	5	5	0	0	338	41	297	5	25
2	SC Neuenheim	5	3	1	1	130	109	21	1	16
3	RG Heidelberg	5	2	1	2	166	153	13	3	13
4	TV Pforzheim	5	2	0	3	195	137	22	4	12
5	TSV Handschuhsheim	5	2	0	3	104	136	–32	1	9
6	Heidelberger TV	5	0	0	5	41	362	–321	0	0

- Relegated: None
- Promoted: None

Club	HRK	RGH	TVP	SCN	TSV	HTV
Heidelberger RK	—	66–22		42–0	61–7	
RG Heidelberg		—		23–23	11–15	71–17
TV Pforzheim	12–72	32–39	—	28–41		
SC Neuenheim				—	27–13	39–3
TSV Handschuhsheim			13–24		—	56–13
Heidelberger TV	0–97		8–99			—

=== Second stage ===
In the second stage sixteen clubs played in two groups of eight clubs each. Within each group each team played the others home and away except for the match-ups that already had been played in the first round. The results of those were carried over. All teams in this stage qualified for the play-offs and were seeded according to the final standings.

==== North-East ====
The table and results of the division:

	Club	Played	W	D	L	PF	PA	Diff	BP	Points
1	DSV 78 Hannover	14	14	0	0	1040	89	951	13	69
2	Berliner Rugby Club	14	12	0	2	771	137	634	11	59
3	RK 03 Berlin	14	9	0	5	459	317	142	8	44
4	FC St. Pauli Rugby	14	8	0	6	382	361	21	9	41
5	SC Germania List	14	6	0	8	449	442	7	4	28
6	USV Potsdam Rugby	14	3	0	11	243	747	–504	5	19
7	TSV Victoria Linden	14	2	0	12	179	592	–413	5	13
8	Berliner SV 92 Rugby	14	2	0	12	147	985	–838	0	8

Club	DSV	STP	GER	VIC	BRC	RKB	USV	BSV
DSV 78 Hannover	—	62–5	74–11	65–0	24–10	32–14	168–0	119–5
FC St. Pauli Rugby	3–32	—	43–10	42–10	10–47	15–20	25–24	70–7
SC Germania List	3–86	16–32	—	34–0	16–50	46–31	101–3	83–5
TSV Victoria Linden	0–102	22–33	0–13	—	14–36	26–46	28–24	41–10
Berliner Rugby Club	16–30	62–0	52–5	67–0	—	61–10	94–0	138–7
RK 03 Berlin	13–33	22–19	36–13	54–5	11–28	—	42–7	46–13
USV Potsdam Rugby	6–99	20–49	20–8	47–19	5–42	11–24	—	58–27
Berliner SV 92 Rugby	3–114	7–36	10–90	19–14	5–68	8–90	21–18	—

==== South-West ====
The table and results of the division:

	Club	Played	W	D	L	PF	PA	Diff	BP	Points
1	Heidelberger RK	14	14	0	0	1100	104	996	13	65
2	SC Neuenheim	14	10	1	3	709	221	488	9	51
3	TV Pforzheim	14	10	0	4	944	290	654	11	47
4	RG Heidelberg	14	8	1	5	555	401	154	9	43
5	SC 1880 Frankfurt	14	7	0	7	408	506	–98	7	35
6	RK Heusenstamm	14	4	0	10	361	695	–334	9	25
7	ASV Köln Rugby	14	2	0	12	133	998	–865	1	9
8	RC Mainz	14	0	0	14	106	1101	–995	2	2

Club	SCF	RKH	ASV	RCM	HRK	RGH	TVP	SCN
SC 1880 Frankfurt	—	22–20	81–0	62–15	3–57	36–31	17–37	15–59
RK Heusenstamm	24–40	—	93–5	58–10	12–76	28–32	5–123	0–81
ASV Köln Rugby	0–27	17–38	—	38–22	8–95	12–64	5–109	9–60
RC Mainz	6–60	0–42	16–22	—	6–90	0–91	0–149	10–69
Heidelberger RK	97–0	74–7	129–0	161–0	—	66–22	40–22	42–0
RG Heidelberg	57–16	72–27	52–12	50–0	5–64	—	12–63	23–23
TV Pforzheim	48–22	64–7	131–0	93–15	12–72	32–39	—	28–41
SC Neuenheim	55–7	79–0	81–5	116–6	7–38	22–5	16–33	—

Denotes results carried over from first stage

- Heusenstamm's home game against Mainz was played in Mainz as Heusenstamm's home ground was unfit to be played on due to weather conditions.
- Both games between Heusenstamm and Heidelberger RK were played at Heusenstamm.
- TV Pforzheim deducted four points for insufficient number of youth teams.
- SC 1880 Frankfurt's home game against SC Neuenheim, originally ending 15–59, was awarded 50–0 to Frankfurt because Neuenheim fielded two ineligible players. This decision was later reversed and the original result restored.
- RG Heidelberg's home game against RC Mainz was not played as Mainz canceled because of a lack of players. Game awarded 50–0 to Heidelberg.

=== Play-off stage ===
In the play-offs the sixteen qualified clubs play a knock-out competition in single game format with the winner moving on to the next round. In the first round of the play-off the north-east division clubs play against the south-west division clubs. The play-offs began on 4 May with the round of sixteen, followed by the quarter-finals on 25 May, semi finals on 1 June and the German championship final on 15 June 2013. However, both semi final games, to be held in Heidelberg, had to be postponed because of bad weather, and rescheduled for 12 June.

Round of 16
S1	Heidelberger RK	50
N8	Berliner SV 92 Rugby	0
N4	FC St. Pauli Rugby	13
S5	SC 1880 Frankfurt	30
N2	Berliner Rugby Club	84
S7	ASV Köln Rugby	7
S3	TV Pforzheim	50
N6	USV Potsdam Rugby	0
N1	DSV 78 Hannover	131
S8	RC Mainz	3
S4	RG Heidelberg	103
N5	SC Germania List	10
S2	SC Neuenheim	50
N7	TSV Victoria Linden	0
N3	RK 03 Berlin	45
S6	RK Heusenstamm	34

Quarter finals
S1	Heidelberger RK	66
S5	SC 1880 Frankfurt	0
N2	Berliner Rugby Club	7
S3	TV Pforzheim	49
N1	DSV 78 Hannover	7
S4	RG Heidelberg	13
S2	SC Neuenheim	36
N3	RK 03 Berlin	10

Semi finals
S1	Heidelberger RK	51
S3	TV Pforzheim	9
S4	RG Heidelberg	18
S2	SC Neuenheim	32

Final
S1	Heidelberger RK	41
S2	SC Neuenheim	10

- The Berliner SV 92, Victoria Linden and USV Potsdam all cancelled their first round play-off games, citing a lack of players, with all three games awarded 50-0 to the opposition.
