= SC Siemensstadt Rugby =

German rugby union club, based in Berlin

(Germany) SC Siemensstadt Rugby
- Full name: Sport Club Siemensstadt Berlin e.V.
- Union: German Rugby Federation
- Founded: 1923; 103 years ago
- Location: Berlin, Germany
- Chairman: Lucas Sawallich
- League: Rugby-Regionalliga (III)
- 2014–15: Rugby-Bundesliga North/East, withdrawn

The SC Siemensstadt Rugby is a German rugby union club from the Siemensstadt locality of Berlin.

== History ==
The rugby department predates the formation of the mother club SC Siemensstadt in 1975, which was formed in a merger of TV Siemensstadt and SpVgg Wacker Siemensstadt. The department, formed in 1923, was initially part of the Sportvereinigung Siemens and later became part of TV Siemensstadt before becoming a founding member of the Rugby-Bundesliga in 1971.

The club remained part of the Rugby-Bundesliga until 1974 when it was relegated. After playing in the 2nd Rugby-Bundesliga and dropping to the Rugby-Regionalliga the club made a return to the second tier in 2012 with the expansion of the Bundesliga and 2nd Bndesliga. From 2013 onwards it merged its rugby team with the team of the Berlin Grizzlies to play as SG Siemensstadt/Grizzlies. Under this name the club achieved promotion to the Rugby-Bundesliga in 2014.

The joint team qualified for the championship round of the 2014–15 Rugby-Bundesliga but was removed from competition in March 2015 after failing to field in two consecutive matches. The club moved back to the tier three Rugby-Regionalliga for the 2015–16 season.

== Recent seasons ==
Recent seasons of the club:

Year	Division	Position
2012–13	2. Rugby-Bundesliga qualification round – East	2nd
2012–13	DRV-Pokal – North-East	6th
2013–14	2. Rugby-Bundesliga qualification round – East	1st
2013–14	DRV-Pokal – North-East	4th — Quarter finals
2014–15	Rugby-Bundesliga qualification round – East	4th
2014–15	Rugby-Bundesliga championship round – North-East	withdrawn
2015–16	Rugby-Regionalliga East (III)	

- Until 2001, when the single-division Bundesliga was established, the season was divided in autumn and spring, a Vorrunde and Endrunde, whereby the top teams of the Rugby-Bundesliga would play out the championship while the bottom teams together with the autumn 2nd Bundesliga champion would play for Bundesliga qualification. The remainder of the 2nd Bundesliga teams would play a spring round to determine the relegated clubs. Where two placing's are shown, the first is autumn, the second spring. In 2012 the Bundesliga was expanded from ten to 24 teams and the 2nd Bundesliga from 20 to 24 with the leagues divided into four regional divisions.
