= TSV Victoria Linden =

German rugby union club, based in Hannover

(Germany) TSV Victoria Linden
- Full name: Turn und Sportverein Victoria Linden e.V.
- Union: German Rugby Federation
- Founded: 1900; 126 years ago
- Location: Hannover, Germany
- Chairman: Oliver Gust
- Coach: Rainer Kumm
- League: Rugby-Bundesliga
- 2015–16: 1. Rugby-Bundesliga North
Team kit

Official website
- www.victoria-linden.de

The TSV Victoria Linden is a German rugby union club from the Linden suburb of Hannover, currently playing in the Rugby-Bundesliga. Apart from rugby, the club also offers other sports, such as triathlon and athletics. The club's premier men's rugby team in one of four in the country to have established professional status.

The club is Germany's record rugby union champion, with 20 titles.

== History ==
Victoria was formed in 1900, in Hannover, one of the centres of German rugby.

The club had little success before the First World War and could only earn one national championship between the wars, in 1929. Two losing finals came before that, in 1924 and 1927.

After its title, Victoria continued its undistinguished run until after the Second World War, when it became Germany's most successful club.

The club took out its second title in what was the first German championship after the war, in 1948. It didn't lose in any of its following nine finals appearances, achieving six championships in a row from 1951 to 1956. The club could not quite continue in this dominance but was successful nevertheless.

Titles in 1958, 1962 and 1965 were followed by a rare finals loss to SC Neuenheim in 1967. The team was part of the new Rugby-Bundesliga, formed in 1971, and won three more titles until 1975.

From 1976 to 1984, it had a less successful spell, a cup win in 1982 being the only title it won.

From 1987 onwards, Victoria returned to former glory, reaching eleven championship finals in fourteen years until the turn of the millennium.

Linden noticeably declined from then on, unable to finish in the league's top-four after 2001. With the establishment of a single-division Bundesliga that year, the competition had become stronger owing to the top clubs from the south and the north now playing in the same league instead of only meeting in the championship rounds.

The club suffered a bitter relegation in 2006, having to step down to the 2nd Bundesliga North/East after finishing last in the Bundesliga.

In 2007, the team was not competitive enough to play for promotion, coming fourth, and the season after, 2007-08, it missed out in second spot by four points.

In the 2008-09 season, Victoria finished in second spot once more, fifteen points behind DSV 78/08 Ricklingen. Victoria who only won the 2009-10 North/East division in the last round of the championship, declined promotion to the Rugby-Bundesliga, citing the additional cost of travelling and the limited player pool as their reason. The South/West champion, Stuttgarter RC, has also indicated that it would probably not take up promotion, leaving the Bundesliga briefly with the possibility of only eight clubs and none from hanover for the next season. DSV 78 however was permitted to remain in the league and Victoria took out another division championship in 2011, but again declined promotion.

A league reform in 2012 allowed the club promotion to the Bundesliga as the league was expanded from ten to 24 teams. Victoria finished fourth in their group in the 2012-13 season and qualified for the north/east division of the championship round, where it came seventh. The club opted to not play their first round play-off match, citing player shortage, and was thereby knocked out of the championship with the game awarded 50-0 to the opposition.

In 2013–14 the team qualified for the championship and the play-offs once more, losing 101–10 to RG Heidelberg in the first round. In the 2014–15 season the club finished third in the north-east DRV-Pokal group but was knocked out of the first round of the play-offs after a 17–10 loss to StuSta München. With the reduction of the Bundesliga from 24 to 18 teams Victoria was relegated at the end of the 2014–15 season but promoted again in the following season.

== Club honours ==
- German rugby union championship
  - Champions: 1929, 1948, 1951–56, 1958, 1962, 1965, 1969, 1972, 1975, 1987, 1989, 1992–94, 1996
  - Runners up: 1924, 1927, 1967, 1976, 1984, 1991, 1995, 1997, 1998, 2000
- German rugby union cup
  - Winner: 1965, 1966, 1982, 1989, 1991–93
  - Runners up: 1962-64, 1969, 1971, 1972, 1976, 1985, 1994
- German sevens championship
  - Champions: 2000
- 2nd Rugby-Bundesliga North/East
  - Champions: 2010, 2011
  - Runners up: 2008, 2009

== Recent seasons ==
Recent seasons of the club:

Year	Division	Position
1997-98	Rugby-Bundesliga (I)	1st — Runners up
1998-99	Rugby-Bundesliga North/East	2nd
1998-99	Bundesliga championship round	5th
1999–2000	Rugby-Bundesliga North/East	2nd
1999–2000	Bundesliga championship round	2nd — Runners up
2000-01	Rugby-Bundesliga North/East	3rd
2000-01	Bundesliga championship round	5th
2001-02	Rugby-Bundesliga	5th
2002-03	Rugby-Bundesliga	6th
2003-04	Rugby-Bundesliga	6th
2004-05	Rugby-Bundesliga	6th
2005-06	Rugby-Bundesliga	8th — Relegated
2006-07	2nd Rugby-Bundesliga North/East (II)	4th
2007-08	2nd Rugby-Bundesliga North/East	2nd
2008-09	2nd Rugby-Bundesliga North/East	2nd
2009–10	2nd Rugby-Bundesliga North/East	1st
2010–11	2nd Rugby-Bundesliga North/East	1st
2011–12	2nd Rugby-Bundesliga North/East	6th — Promoted
2012–13	Rugby-Bundesliga qualification round – North	4th
2012–13	Rugby-Bundesliga championship round – North-East	7th — Round of sixteen
2013–14	Rugby-Bundesliga qualification round – North	4th
2013–14	Rugby-Bundesliga championship round – North-East	6th — First round
2014–15	Rugby-Bundesliga qualification round – North	5th
2014–15	DRV-Pokal – North-East	3rd – First round – Relegated
2015–16	2nd Rugby-Bundesliga North	1st – Promoted

- Until 2001, when the single-division Bundesliga was established, the season was divided in autumn and spring, a Vorrunde and Endrunde, whereby the top teams of the Rugby-Bundesliga would play out the championship while the bottom teams together with the autumn 2nd Bundesliga champion would play for Bundesliga qualification. The remainder of the 2nd Bundesliga teams would play a spring round to determine the relegated clubs. Where two placing's are shown, the first is autumn, the second spring. In 2012 the Bundesliga was expanded from ten to 24 teams and the 2nd Bundesliga from 20 to 24 with the leagues divided into four regional divisions.

== Rugby internationals ==
The club had one player selected for the German under-18 team at the 2009 European Under-18 Rugby Union Championship, Jörn Schröder. Schröder also played at the 2010 tournament.
