= List of rugby union clubs in Germany =

This is a List of rugby union clubs in Germany. It lists all rugby union clubs in Germany registered with the German Rugby Federation, the DRV, or taking part in the German league system. As of April 2010, the International Rugby Board lists the number of clubs in Germany at 110.

Some of the clubs competing in the German league system are clubs of the US and British armed forces in Germany and therefore not necessarily members of the DRV. Examples of US Army rugby clubs in Germany are the teams in Illesheim, Ramstein and Vilseck, while other clubs, like in the RC Kaiserslautern, recruit some of their players from the US forces but have German players as well. Up to 32 US forces teams had been playing in Southern Germany at its peak, based in Hesse, Rhineland-Palatinate, Bavaria and Baden-Württemberg, being organised in the "United States Forces Europe Rugby Union" (USFERU). Most disappeared with the withdrawal of US forces from Germany at the end of the Cold War. A number of clubs remained but have since dropped out of the German league system, like the Bamberg RFC, Darmstadt 233rd BSB RFC, Hanau Hornets, Schweinfurt RFC, Spangdahlem RFC and Würzburg RFC, while a few, like the Ramstein Rogues RFC, Illesheim RFC and Baumholder RFC still compete in 2009–10.

The RC Mönchengladbach Rhinos and the Elmpt Falcons are rugby teams of the British Army in Germany and still active.

The oldest rugby union club in Germany is the DSV 78 Hannover, formed in 1878 as DFV Hannover, in a time when a differencation between rugby and football was not yet made in Germany. While there is older clubs in Germany then DSV 78, like the Heidelberger TV which was formed in 1846, their rugby departments were established after DSV's.

== Clubs by state ==
The German rugby clubs, listed by federal state, with the league their first men's and women's teams play in 2009–10, in as far as the clubs field a senior side at all:

=== Baden-Württemberg ===
Rugby clubs in the state of Baden-Württemberg:

Club	City	2015–16*				Source	
		Men	Tier	Women	Tier	Ref	Link
Freiburger RC	Freiburg	RLBW	III	—	—		
TSV Handschuhsheim	Heidelberg	BL	I	—	—		
RG Heidelberg	Heidelberg	BL	I	—	—		
RG Heidelberg II	Heidelberg	RLBW	III	—	—		
Heidelberger RK	Heidelberg	BL	I	WBL	I		
Heidelberger RK II	Heidelberg	RLBW	III				
Heidelberger TV	Heidelberg	RLBW	III	—	—		
SC Neuenheim	Heidelberg	BL	I	WBL	I		
TB Rohrbach	Heidelberg	RLRP	III	—	—		
TSG Heilbronn	Heilbronn	RLBW	III	—	—		
Karlsruher SV Rugby	Karlsruhe	RLBW	III	—	—		
RC Konstanz	Konstanz	RLBW	III	—	—		
TV Pforzheim	Pforzheim	BL	I	—	—		
TSB Ravensburg Ravens	Ravensburg	—	—	—	—		
RC Rottweil	Rottweil	RLBW	III	WRLS	III		
Stuttgarter RC	Stuttgart	2BLS/W	II	WBL	I		
VfB Schwarz-Rot Ulm	Ulm	RLB	III	—	—		

(* pending updates)

=== Bavaria ===
Rugby clubs in the state of Bavaria:

Club	City	2014–15				Source	
		Men	Tier	Women	Tier	Ref	Link
Augsburg RFC	Augsburg	RLB	III	—	—		
RFC Bad Reichenhall	Bad Reichenhall	RLB	III	—	—		
RC Bayreuth	Bayreuth	VLB	IV	—	—		
RC Fürstenfeldbruck	Fürstenfeldbruck	—	—	—	—		
VfB Hafenlohr	Hafenlohr	VLB	IV	—	—		
Illesheim RFC	Illesheim	VLB	IV	—	—		
TV Memmingen	Memmingen	VLB	IV	—	—		
TV 1861 Ingolstadt	Ingolstadt	RLB	III	—	—		
München RFC	Munich	2BLS/W	II	W2BL	II		
StuSta München	Munich	2BLS/W	II	WRLS	II		
RC Unterföhring	Munich (district)	2BLS/W	II	WRLS	II		
TSV 1846 Nürnberg	Nuremberg	RLB	III	—	—		
RC Regensburg 2000	Regensburg	RLB	III	—	—		
1. FC Schweinfurt 05	Schweinfurt	VLB	IV	—	—		

=== Berlin ===
Rugby clubs in the state of Berlin:

Club	City	2009–10				Source	
		Men	Tier	Women	Tier	Ref	Link
Berliner RC	Berlin	BL	I	—	—		
RK 03 Berlin	Berlin	BL	I	W2BL	II		
Berliner SC	Berlin	RLEB	IV	—	—		
SC Berlin	Berlin	—	—	W2BL	II		
Berliner SV 92 Rugby	Berlin	RLEA	III	WRLE	III		
SC Siemensstadt	Berlin	RLEA	III	—	—		
Berlin Irish RFC	Berlin	RLEA	III	WRLE	III		
Berlin Bruisers	Berlin	RLEA	III	—	—		
Berlin Grizzlies	Berlin	BL	I	—	—		

=== Brandenburg ===
Rugby clubs in the state of Brandenburg:

Club	City	2009–10				Source	
		Men	Tier	Women	Tier	Ref	Link
Stahl Brandenburg Rugby	Brandenburg an der Havel	RLEA	III	—	—		
Stahl Hennigsdorf Rugby	Hennigsdorf	RLEB	IV	—	—		
RU Hohen Neuendorf	Hohen Neuendorf	2BLN/E	II	—	—		
USV Potsdam Rugby	Potsdam	2BLN/E	II	—	—		
RC Trebbin	Trebbin	?	?	—	—		
Veltener RC Empor	Velten	RLEA	III	—	—		

=== Bremen ===
Rugby clubs in the Free Hanseatic City of Bremen:

Club	City	2009–10				Source	
		Men	Tier	Women	Tier	Ref	Link
Bremen 1860	Bremen	RLN	III	—	—		
Union 60 Bremen	Bremen	RLN	III	WRLN	III		

=== Hamburg ===
Rugby clubs in the state of Hamburg:

Club	City	2009–10				Source	
		Men	Tier	Women	Tier	Ref	Link
Hamburg Exiles RFC	Hamburg	RLN	III	—	—		
Hamburger RC	Hamburg	1BL N/E	II	—	—		
Hamburger SV	Hamburg	VLN	IV	—	—		
FC St Pauli Rugby	Hamburg	1BL N/E	II	WBL	I		

=== Hesse ===
Rugby clubs in the state of Hesse:

Club	City	2009–10				Source	
		Men	Tier	Women	Tier	Ref	Link
CRC Babenhausen	Babenhausen	RLH ^{[D]}	III	—	—		
TG 75 Darmstadt	Darmstadt	RLH	III	—	—		
Eintracht Frankfurt Rugby	Frankfurt am Main	RLH	III	WRLW	III		
SC 1880 Frankfurt	Frankfurt am Main	BL	I	—	—		
URC Gießen 01	Gießen	RLH	III	—	—		
RK Heusenstamm	Heusenstamm	BL	I	WRLW	III		
RU Marburg	Marburg	RLH	III	WRLW	III		
TGS 1897 Hausen	Obertshausen	—	—	—	—		
BSC Offenbach	Offenbach am Main	RLH	III	—	—		

=== Lower Saxony ===
Rugby clubs in the state of Lower Saxony:

Club	City	2009–10				Source	
		Men	Tier	Women	Tier	Ref	Link
Welfen SC Braunschweig	Braunschweig	RLN	III	—	—		
RSV Göttingen	Göttingen	RLLS	III	—	—		
VfR Döhren	Hanover	2BLN/E ^{[B]}	II	—	—		
DRC Hannover	Hanover	2BLN/E	II	—	—		
DSV 78 Hannover	Hanover	BL	I	—	—		
SV Odin Hannover	Hanover	2BLN/E ^{[B]}	II	—	—		
NTV 09 Hannover	Hanover	—	—	—	—		
SC Linden	Hanover	—	—	—	—		
FV 1897 Linden	Hanover	—	—	—	—		
TSV Victoria Linden	Hanover	2BLN/E	II	—	—		
SC Germania List	Hanover	2BLN/E	II	WBL	I		
SV 08 Ricklingen	Hanover	RLLS ^{[A]}	III	—	—		
TSV Karlshöfen	Karlshöfen	—	—	WRLN	III		
TKW Nienburg	Nienburg	—	—	—	—		
FC Rastede	Rastede	RLLS	III	—	—		
VfL Jesteburg	Jesteburg	RLN ^{[C]}	III	—	—		
SC Varel	Varel	VLN	IV	—	—		

=== Mecklenburg-Vorpommern ===
Rugby clubs in the state of Mecklenburg-Vorpommern:

Club	City	2009–10				Source	
		Men	Tier	Women	Tier	Ref	Link
SV Dynamo Rostock	Rostock	VLN	IV	—	—		

=== North Rhine-Westphalia ===
Rugby clubs in the state of North Rhine-Westphalia:

Club	City	2009–10				Source	
		Men	Tier	Women	Tier	Ref	Link
RC Aachen	Aachen	2BLW	II	WRLW	III		
RC Bielefeld	Bielefeld	VLNW	IV	—	—		
TV Phönix Bocholt	Bocholt	VLNW	IV	—	—		
RC Bonn-Rhein-Sieg	Bonn	RLNW	III	—	—		
Brühler TV	Brühl	VLNW	IV	—	—		
RFC Dortmund	Dortmund	VLNW	IV	WRLW	III		
TV Aldenrade 07	Duisburg	VLNW	IV	—	—		
TuS 95 Düsseldorf	Düsseldorf	2BLW	II	—	—		
Elmpt Falcons	Elmpt	RLNW	III	—	—		
Grashof RC Essen	Essen	VLNW	IV	—	—		
RC Hürth	Hürth	VLNW	IV	—	—		
ASV Köln Rugby	Cologne	2BLW	II	W2BL	II		
RC Krefeld Bradbury Barbarians	Krefeld	—	—	—	—		
TV Lemgo Lippe Lions	Lemgo	VLNW	IV	—	—		
Cherusker RC Lothe	Lothe	VLNW	IV	—	—		
RC Mönchengladbach Rhinos	Mönchengladbach	RLNW	III	—	—		
RT Münster	Münster	2BLW	II	—	—		
WMTV Solingen	Solingen	RLNW	III	—	—		
Wiedenbrücker TV	Rheda-Wiedenbrück	RLNW	III	W2BL	II		

=== Rhineland-Palatinate ===
Rugby clubs in the state of Rhineland-Palatinate:

Club	City	2024				Source	
		Men	Tier	Women	Tier	Ref	Link
RC Mainz	Mainz	RLH	II	Flying Wombats	—		
Ramstein Rogues RF	Ramstein	RLRP	III	—	—		
FSV Trier-Tarforst	Trier	RLRP	III	WRLW	III		
RC Worms	Worms	RLRP	III	—	—		
Bad Ems Rugby	Bad Ems	RLRP					

=== Saarland ===
Rugby clubs in the state of Saarland:

Club	City	2009–10				Source	
		Men	Tier	Women	Tier	Ref	Link
Stade Sarrois Rugby	Saarbrücken	RLRP	III	—	—		

=== Saxony ===
Rugby clubs in the state of Saxony:

Club	City	2009–10				Source	
		Men	Tier	Women	Tier	Ref	Link
SV Stahl Brandis	Brandis	E7	—	—	—		
Tower Rugby Chemnitz	Chemnitz	E7	—	—	—		
RV Dresden	Dresden	RLEB	IV	WRLE	III		
ATSV Freiberg	Freiberg	E7	—	—	—		
Eastern Province RC Gera	Gera	E7	—	—	—		
SV Horken Kittlitz	Kittlitz	E7	—	—	—		
RC Leipzig	Leipzig	RLEB	IV	WRLE	III		
ESV Lokomotive Riesa	Riesa	—	—	—	—		
HSG Turbine Zittau	Zittau	—	—	—	—		

=== Saxony-Anhalt ===
Rugby clubs in the state of Saxony-Anhalt:

Club	City	2009–10				Source	
		Men	Tier	Women	Tier	Ref	Link
USV Halle	Halle	E7	—	—	—		
WG Magdeburg	Magdeburg	E7	—	—	—		

=== Schleswig-Holstein ===
Rugby clubs in the state of Schleswig-Holstein:

Club	City	2009–10				Source	
		Men	Tier	Women	Tier	Ref	Link
FT Adler Kiel Rugby	Kiel	2BLN/E	II	—	—		
VfL Geesthacht Harlekins	Geesthacht	RLN ^{[C]}	III	—	—		

=== Thuringia ===
Rugby clubs in the state of Thuringia:

Club	City	2009–10				Source	
		Men	Tier	Women	Tier	Ref	Link
SSV Erfurt-Nord	Erfurt	E7	—	W2BL	—		
USV Jena	Jena	RLEB	IV	W2BL	—		

== Foreign clubs ==
In the 2009–10 season, two clubs from outside the borders of Germany take part in German league competitions, one from Luxembourg and one from Austria:

Club	City	2009–10				Source	
		Men	Tier	Women	Tier	Ref	Link
WRC Innsbruck	Innsbruck	—	—	WRLS	III		
RC Luxembourg	Luxembourg	2BLS/W	II	—	—		

== Defunct clubs & teams ==
=== Germany ===
The following clubs have ceased to exist or stopped operating a rugby department:

Club	City	Fate	Ref
BFC Frankfurt 1885	Berlin	club switched codes from rugby to football, now defunct	
SG Ordnungspolizei Berlin	Berlin		
Tennis Borussia Berlin	Berlin	rugby department left club in 1936 to join Berliner SV and form Berliner SV 92 Rugby	
SV Polizei Hamburg	Hamburg	rugby department defunct	
SC Elite Hannover	Hanover	rugby department defunct since the 1970s	
FC 1897 Hannover	Hanover		
Hawa-Alexandria Hannover	Hanover	club defunct since 1931	
VfV Hannover	Hanover	rugby department defunct since 1963, when the department joined NTV 09 Hannover	
FV Stuttgart	Stuttgart	club switched codes from rugby to football, merged to form VfB Stuttgart	

=== East Germany ===
The following clubs existed in the former country of East Germany. Some of them have ceased to exist or to operate a rugby department while others have changed their name:

Club	City	Fate	Ref
BSG Lok Berlin	Berlin	rugby department defunct, club now ESV Lok Berlin-Schöneweide	
BSG Post Berlin	Berlin	rugby department now RK 03 Berlin	
ASK Vorwärts Berlin	Berlin	rugby department defunct	
BSG Stahl Brandenburg	Brandenburg	now Stahl Brandenburg Rugby	
SG Dynamo Dresden	Dresden	rugby department defunct	
BSG Lok Falkensee	Falkensee		
Ingenieurschule Hennigsdorf	Hennigsdorf	club defunct	
BSG Stahl Hennigsdorf	Hennigsdorf	now Stahl Hennigsdorf Rugby	
BSG Stahl Leegebruch	Leegebruch	club defunct	
SC DHfK Leipzig	Leipzig	rugby department now part of RC Leipzig	
BSG Gastronom Leipzig	Leipzig	rugby department now part of RC Leipzig	
BSG Lokomotive Wahren Leipzig	Leipzig	rugby department now part of RC Leipzig	
SG Dynamo Potsdam	Potsdam	club defunct	
RG 88 Potsdam	Potsdam	now USV Potsdam Rugby	
Empor Velten	Velten	now Veltener RC	

== Key ==
Men:
BL – Rugby-Bundesliga
2BLN/E – 2nd Rugby-Bundesliga North/East
2BLS/W – 2nd Rugby-Bundesliga South/West
RLBW – Regionalliga Baden-Württemberg
RLB – Regionalliga Bavaria
RLEA – Regionalliga East – Division A
RLEB – Regionalliga East – Division B
RLH – Regionalliga Hesse
RLLS – Regionalliga Lower Saxony
RLN – Regionalliga North
RLNW – Regionalliga North Rhine-Westphalia
RLRP – Regionalliga Rhineland-Palatinate
VLB – Verbandsliga Bavaria
VLBW – Verbandsliga Baden-Württemberg
VLN – Verbandsliga North
VLNW – Verbandsliga North Rhine-Westphalia
E7 – East 7s league ^{[E]}

Women:
WBL – Women's Rugby Bundesliga
W2BL – Women's 2nd Rugby Bundesliga
WRLE – Women's Regionalliga East
WRLN – Women's Regionalliga North
WRLS – Women's Regionalliga South
WRLW – Women's Regionalliga West

== Notes ==
A. Playing as 08 Ricklingen/Wunstorf, a partnership of SV 08 Ricklingen and TuS Wunstorf.
B. Playing as SG SV Odin/VfR Döhren, a partnership of SV Odin Hannover and VfR Döhren.
C. Playing as SG Jesteburg/Geesthacht, a partnership of VfL Jesteburg and VfL Geesthacht Harlekins.
D. Playing as SG 80 III/Babenhausen, a partnership of the third team of SC 1880 Frankfurt and CRC Babenhausen.
E. The East 7s league, or Mitteldeutsche Siebener Liga, is a development league for emerging rugby clubs in what was formerly East Germany.
