= Walger =

Walger is a German surname. Notable people with the surname include:

- Dennis Walger (born 1984), German international rugby union player
- Markus Walger (born 1979), German international rugby union player
- Sonya Walger (born 1974), English actress

== See also ==
- Walgerbach, river of district Marburg-Biedenkopf in Hesse, Germany
