= Women's Rugby Bundesliga =

The Women's Rugby Bundesliga is the top national competition for women's rugby union football clubs in Germany. The competition started in 1988 and the most successful teams are the SC Neuenheim, FC St. Pauli and Heidelberger RK.

In October 2009, it was decided to continue with the development plan for the women's Bundesliga. From 2013, the league is scheduled to have eight clubs in a single-division format, from 2016 it is to be expanded to ten clubs.

== Championship finals ==
Season	Winner	Runner–Up	Result
1987–88	SC Neuenheim		
1988–89	SC Neuenheim		
1989–90	SC Neuenheim		
1990–91	SC Neuenheim	DRC Hannover	30–0
1991–92	SC Neuenheim		
1992–93	SC Neuenheim	DRC Hannover	22–7
1993–94	RC Rottweil	SC Neuenheim	3–0
1994–95	FC St. Pauli	SC Neuenheim	23–5
1995–96	SC Neuenheim	FC St. Pauli	14–5
1996–97	SC Neuenheim	FC St. Pauli	12–8
1997–98	SC Neuenheim	FC St. Pauli	26–12
1998–99	SC Neuenheim	FC St. Pauli	17–15
1999–2000	FC St. Pauli	SC Neuenheim	39–3
2000–01	FC St. Pauli	SC Neuenheim	37–8
2001–02	DRC Hannover	FC St. Pauli	18–17
2002–03	FC St. Pauli	SC Germania List	25–0
2003–04	SC Neuenheim	FC St. Pauli	31–5
2004–05	FC St. Pauli	SC Neuenheim	15–0
2005–06	FC St. Pauli	SC Germania List	17–5
2006–07	FC St. Pauli	Heidelberger RK	34–17
2007–08	FC St. Pauli	SC Neuenheim	29–7
2008–09	SC Neuenheim	Heidelberger RK	24–23
2009–10	Heidelberger RK	SC Neuenheim	37–5
2010–11	Heidelberger RK	SC Neuenheim	58–5
2011–12	Heidelberger RK	FC St. Pauli	27–19
2012–13	Heidelberger RK	SC Neuenheim	19–0
2013–14	Heidelberger RK	SC Neuenheim	14–7
2014–15	Heidelberger RK	SC Neuenheim	10–7
2015–16	Heidelberger RK	SC Neuenheim	13–10

Source:"Die Deutschen Meister der Frauen". Deutscher Rugby Verband.

== Placings ==
Recent placings in the Rugby Bundesliga:

Club	01	02	03	04	05	06	07	08	09	10	11	12	13	14	15	16
SC Neuenheim	2	2	3	1	2	4	4	2	1	2	2	2	2	1	2	1
Heidelberger RK					5	3	2	3	2	1	1	1	1	3	1	2
ASV Köln Rugby					3	5					6	4	4	2	5	3
FC St. Pauli Rugby	1	1	1	2	1	1	1	1	3	4	3	1	1	4	3	4
SC Germania List			2	2	4	2	3	4	5	5	5	5	2	6	4	5
SG Rhein-Main												3	3	5	7	6
München RFC			4	4							9	6			8	7
Stuttgarter RC								5	4	3	10	5	5	7	6	
SC Berlin								6					3			
SG Mitteldeutsches Rugby											4	3	4			
Ramstein Rogues RUFC													5			
SG SC Berlin/ Berliner SV 92 Rugby											8	2				
SG Marburg/Gießen											3	4				
RC Leipzig						6	5									
Berliner SV/RC Leipzig					6											
DRC Hannover	3	3														
TSV Handschuhsheim/Karlsruher SV		4														
TuS Fürstenfeldbruck/München RFC		5														
TSV Handschuhsheim	4															
