= Erwin Thiesies =

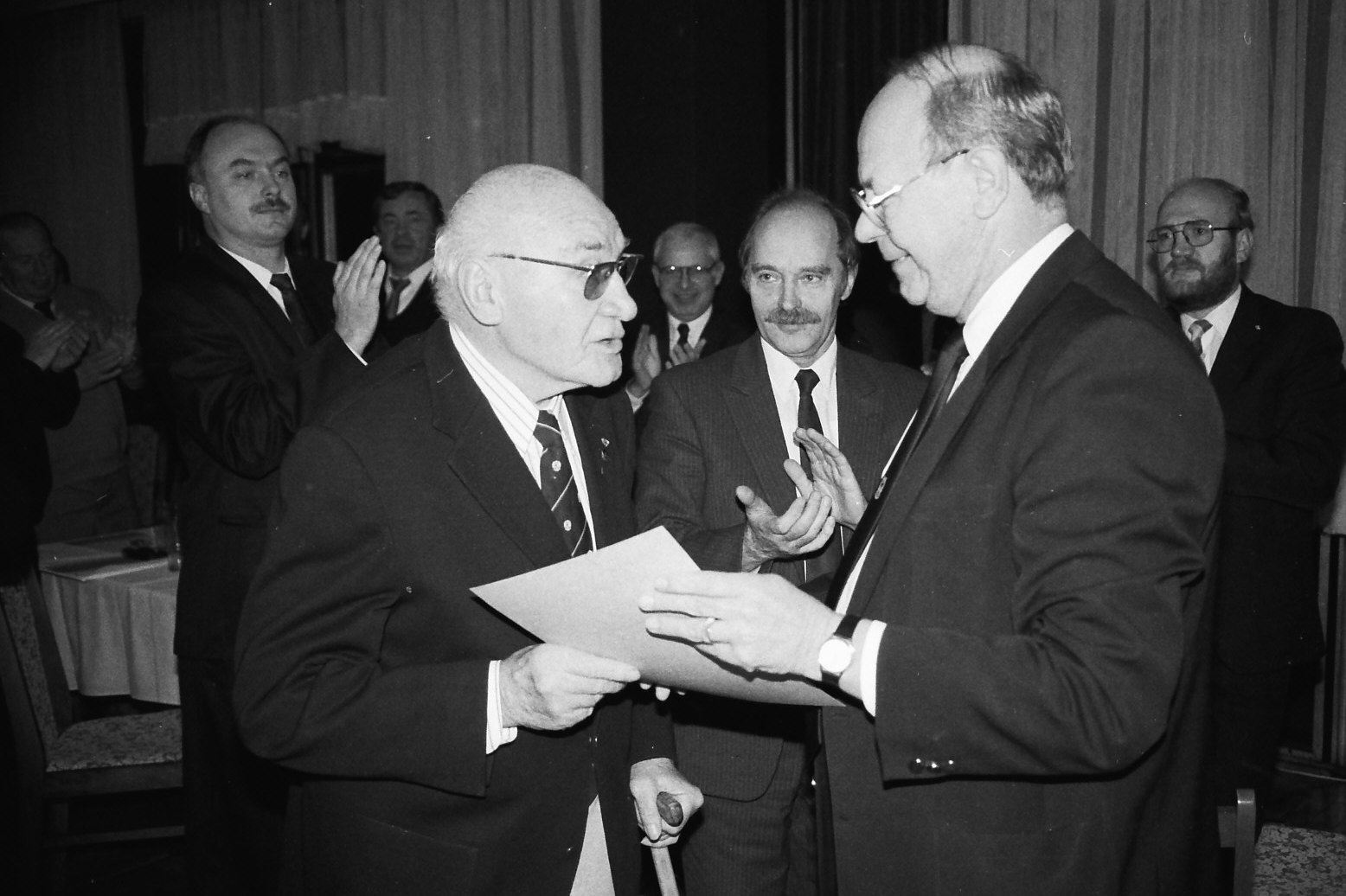
- DRV President Willi Eckert honors the first DRSV national coach Erwin Thiesies, Gert Scharn, DRSV President until 1990 (center of the picture)
- Born: Erwin Thiesies; August 22, 1908 Berlin, German Empire
- Died: February 18, 1993 (aged 84) Hennigsdorf, Germany
- Occupation: Tailor

Rugby union career
- Position: ?
Amateur team(s)
Years	Team	Apps	(Points)
- Berliner SV 92 Rugby
- Correct as of 10 April 2010
International career
Years	Team	Apps	(Points)
1934 - 1940	Germany	14	
- Correct as of 10 April 2010
Coaching career
- Years: Team
- 1948 - 1977: Stahl Hennigsdorf
- 1951 - 1972: East Germany

Erwin Thiesies (22 August 1908 – 18 February 1993) was a German international rugby union player, playing for the Berliner SV 92 Rugby and the Germany national rugby union team.

After the Second World War, Thiesies helped form the rugby department of BSG Stahl Hennigsdorf, which he coached until 1977. He was also the coach of the German Democratic Republic national rugby union team from 1951 to 1972.

== Biography ==
Thiesies was born in 1908 in Berlin, as the son of the custodian of a block of rental flats. After his school years, he took out an apprenticeship as a tailor and took up boxing and gymnastics as sports.

He came in contact with the sport of rugby union through Tennis Borussia Berlin and the Berliner SV 92 Rugby and, despite his humble origins was ambitious in life. He broke through as a forward to the first team of the Berliner SV and the Germany national team. He was described as a player of iron discipline by Hermann Meister, long term president of the German Rugby Federation, and was somebody who abstained from alcohol and nicotine, rather devoting his time to running and cycling. He was called up fourteen times for Germany from 1934 to 1940. He was part of the German team that achieved Germany's last rugby victory over France, a 3-0 on 27 March 1938 in Frankfurt am Main.

During the Second World War, he was stationed in France and was able to make contact with French rugby players, who he trained with.

Having lost his house in Berlin through aerial bombings during the war, he and his wife Jette moved to relatives in Hennigsdorf after the war. He began to train the local youth in the game of rugby and was the founding father of the rugby department of BSG Stahl Hennigsdorf.

In 1950, he became a member of the new rugby branch of the East German Football Association. He became the full-time coach of Stahl in 1953, being employed through the local steelworks. He was also the first coach of the new East Germany national team, which he was in charge of in 35 internationals throughout the years.

Until his retirement in 1977, he coached Stahl to 17 national championships. Over the years, he was honoured by German and international rugby federations for his service to the sport.

He remained a strong supporter of rugby in Hennigsdorf until his death in 1993 and is remembered as the soul of rugby in the town.

== Honours ==
=== Coach ===
- East German rugby union championship
  - Champions: (17) 1952, 1953, 1960–62, 1965–71, 1973–77
