= 2006–07 Rugby-Bundesliga =

- Countries: Germany
- Champions: RG Heidelberg (4th title)
- Runners-up: RG Heidelberg
- Relegated: DSV 78/08 Ricklingen

The 2006-07 Rugby-Bundesliga was the 36th edition of this competition and the 87th edition of the German rugby union championship. The season went from 26 August 2006 to 12 May 2007, ending with the championship final.

Location of teams in the Rugby-Bundesliga 2006-07

== Overview ==
In the 2006-07 season, eight teams played a home-and-away season with a final between the top two teams at the end, which was won by the RG Heidelberg, earning the club a fourth national championship.

The regular season winner, SC 1880 Frankfurt, lost the final to Heidelberg, which was played in Frankfurt am Main. Frankfurt had been newly promoted to the league. It was only the second time in the history of the German championship that no club from Hannover played in the final.

Last placed DSV 78/08 Ricklingen was relegated to the 2nd Rugby-Bundesliga while the RK Heusenstamm was promoted as the 2nd Bundesliga champions, having beaten SC Germania List in the final.

== Bundesliga table ==
	Club	Played	Won	Drawn	Lost	Points for	Points against	Difference	Points
1	SC 1880 Frankfurt	14	12	1	1	648	135	513	39
2	RG Heidelberg	14	10	1	3	404	199	205	34
3	DRC Hannover	14	9	0	5	308	231	77	32
4	SC Neuenheim	14	8	2	4	270	200	70	31
5	Berliner Rugby Club	14	6	1	7	302	282	20	26
6	TSV Handschuhsheim	14	5	0	9	204	278	-74	24
7	Heidelberger RK	14	2	1	11	194	516	-322	19
8	DSV 78/08 Ricklingen	14	1	0	13	172	661	-489	16

- Relegated: DSV 78/08 Ricklingen
- Promoted: RK Heusenstamm

== Bundesliga results ==
=== Results table ===
Club	SCF	RGH	DRC	SCN	BRC	TSV	HRK	DSV
SC 1880 Frankfurt	—	30-16	38-3	41-20	50-0	36-24	50-0	109-3
RG Heidelberg	17-12	—	29-18	0-0	30-22	20-3	40-5	88-0
DRC Hannover	10-20	24-15	—	18-13	17-23	28-19	33-8	38-0
SC Neuenheim	12-12	16-9	20-10	—	16-21	33-6	27-6	31-3
Berliner RC	16-27	12-27	8-25	10-16	—	12-11	13-13	30-11
TSV Handschuhsheim	11-27	10-28	19-23	17-24	9-8	—	16-3	22-17
Heidelberger RK	3-101	34-36	7-34	27-10	10-74	6-22	—	45-24
DSV 78/08 Ricklingen	0-95	13-49	17-27	20-32	20-53	13-15	36-27	—

==== Key ====
Home win	Draw	Away win	Game not played

=== Round 1 ===
2006-08-26
14:30

DRC Hannover	10 – 20	SC 1880 Frankfurt

Referee: Scharmann

2006-08-26
15:00

Berliner Rugby Club	12 – 11	TSV Handschuhsheim

Referee: Tietge

2006-08-27
16:30

RG Heidelberg	40 – 5	Heidelberger RK

Referee: Roberts

2006-10-03
15:00

SC Neuenheim	31 – 3	DSV 78/08 Ricklingen

Referee: Frederking

=== Round 2 ===
2006-09-02
14:30

DSV 78/08 Ricklingen	20 – 53	Berliner Rugby Club

Referee: Pangritz

2006-09-02
15:00

SC Neuenheim	20 – 10	DRC Hannover

Referee: Tietge

2006-09-02
17:00

SC 1880 Frankfurt	30 – 16	RG Heidelberg

Referee: Frederking

2006-09-03
15:00

Heidelberger RK	6 – 22	TSV Handschuhsheim

Referee: Reinecke

=== Round 3 ===
2006-09-09
14:30

SC Neuenheim	16 – 21	Berliner Rugby Club

Referee: Reinecke

2006-09-09
15:00

SC 1880 Frankfurt	109 – 3	DSV 78/08 Ricklingen

Referee: Roberts

2006-09-09
15:00

DRC Hannover	33 – 8	Heidelberger RK

Referee: Scheuerlein

2006-09-09
16:30

TSV Handschuhsheim	10 – 28	RG Heidelberg

Referee: Blank

=== Round 4 ===
2006-10-07
15:00

RG Heidelberg	30 – 22	Berliner Rugby Club

Referee: Kirkham

2006-10-07
15:00

SC 1880 Frankfurt	36 – 24	TSV Handschuhsheim

Referee: Frederking

2006-10-08
15:00

DSV 78/08 Ricklingen	12 – 27	DRC Hannover

Referee: Scharmann

2006-10-08
15:00

Heidelberger RK	27 – 10	SC Neuenheim

Referee: Roberts

=== Round 5 ===
2006-10-14
15:00

DRC Hannover	24 – 15	RG Heidelberg

Referee: Tietge

2006-10-14
15:00

Berliner Rugby Club	13 – 13	Heidelberger RK

Referee: Scheuerlein

2006-10-14
15:00

TSV Handschuhsheim	22 – 17	DSV 78/08 Ricklingen

Referee: Roberts

2006-10-15
16:30

SC Neuenheim	12 – 12	SC 1880 Frankfurt

Referee: Lucas

=== Round 6 ===
2006-10-21
14:30

DSV 78/08 Ricklingen	13 – 49	RG Heidelberg

Referee: Ljungdahl

2006-10-21
15:00

Heidelberger RK	3 – 101	SC 1880 Frankfurt

Referee: Blank

2006-10-22
14:30

DRC Hannover	17 – 23	Berliner Rugby Club

Referee: Frederking

2006-10-22
15:00

SC Neuenheim	33 – 6	TSV Handschuhsheim

Referee: Reinecke

=== Round 7 ===
2006-10-28
15:00

Berliner Rugby Club	16 – 27	SC 1880 Frankfurt

Referee: Scharmann

2006-10-28
16:30

TSV Handschuhsheim	19 – 23	DRC Hannover

Referee: Lucas

2006-10-29
14:30

Heidelberger RK	45 – 24	DSV 78/08 Ricklingen

Referee: Kirkham

2006-10-29
16:30

RG Heidelberg	0 – 0	SC Neuenheim

Referee: Roberts

=== Round 8 ===
2006-11-25
14:30

DSV 78/08 Ricklingen	20 – 32	SC Neuenheim

Referee: Reinecke

2006-11-25
14:30

TSV Handschuhsheim	9 – 8	Berliner Rugby Club

Referee: Lucas

2006-11-25
15:00

SC 1880 Frankfurt	38 – 3	DRC Hannover

Referee: Ljungdahl

2006-11-26
15:00

Heidelberger RK	34 – 36	RG Heidelberg

Referee: Frederking

=== Round 9 ===
2007-03-17
15:00

Berliner Rugby Club	30 – 11	DSV 78/08 Ricklingen

Referee: Scheuerlein

2007-03-17
15:00

DRC Hannover	18 – 13	SC Neuenheim

Referee: Mallon

2007-03-17
16:30

RG Heidelberg	17 – 12	SC 1880 Frankfurt

Referee: Blank

2007-03-18
16:30

TSV Handschuhsheim	16 – 3	Heidelberger RK

Referee: Reinecke

=== Round 10 ===
2007-03-24
14:30

Berliner Rugby Club	10 – 16	SC Neuenheim

Referee: Scharmann

2007-03-25
15:00

DSV 78/08 Ricklingen	0 – 95	SC 1880 Frankfurt

Referee: Ljungdahl

2007-04-05
19:00

RG Heidelberg	20 – 3	TSV Handschuhsheim

Referee: Blank

2007-04-07
15:00

Heidelberger RK	7 – 34	DRC Hannover

Referee: Kirkham

=== Round 11 ===
2007-03-31
14:30

Berliner Rugby Club	12 – 27	RG Heidelberg

Referee: Tietge

2007-03-31
15:00

TSV Handschuhsheim	11 – 27	SC 1880 Frankfurt

Referee: Frederking

2007-04-01
15:00

SC Neuenheim	27 – 6	Heidelberger RK

Referee: Kirkham

2007-04-25
18:00

DRC Hannover	38 – 0	DSV 78/08 Ricklingen

Referee: Ljungdahl

=== Round 12 ===
2007-04-14
14:30

Heidelberger RK	10 – 74	Berliner Rugby Club

Referee: Frederking

2007-04-14
15:00

DSV 78/08 Ricklingen	13 – 15	TSV Handschuhsheim

Referee: Scheuerlein

2007-04-14
17:30

SC 1880 Frankfurt	41 – 20	SC Neuenheim

Referee: Tietge

2007-04-15
15:00

RG Heidelberg	29 – 18	DRC Hannover

Referee: Roberts

=== Round 13 ===
2007-05-01
15:00

DRC Hannover	28 – 19	TSV Handschuhsheim

Referee: Scharmann

2007-05-01
15:00

SC 1880 Frankfurt	50 – 0	Berliner Rugby Club

Referee: Arnault

2007-05-01
15:00

DSV 78/08 Ricklingen	36 – 27	Heidelberger RK

Referee: Tietge

2007-05-01
17:00

SC Neuenheim	16 – 9	RG Heidelberg

Referee: Reinecke

=== Round 14 ===
2007-05-05
15:00

RG Heidelberg	88 – 0	DSV 78/08 Ricklingen

Referee: Blank

2007-05-05
15:00

SC 1880 Frankfurt	50 – 0	Heidelberger RK

Referee: Kirkham

2007-05-05
15:00

TSV Handschuhsheim	17 – 24	SC Neuenheim

Referee: Ljungdahl

2007-05-05
15:00

Berliner Rugby Club	8 – 25	DRC Hannover

Referee: Scharmann

== Promotion/relegation play-off ==
=== 2nd Bundesliga final ===
2007-05-12
17:00

RK Heusenstamm	52 – 10	SC Germania List

Referee: Reinecke

== Final ==
2007-05-12
15:00

SC 1880 Frankfurt	15 – 23	RG Heidelberg

Sportanlage in der Feldgerichtstrasse, Frankfurt am Main
Referee: Ljungdahl

== 2nd Bundesliga tables ==
=== South/West ===
	Club	Played	Won	Drawn	Lost	Points for	Points against	Difference	Points
1	RK Heusenstamm	18	18	0	0	739	200	539	54
2	ASV Köln Rugby	18	14	1	3	580	188	392	47
3	SC 1880 Frankfurt II	18	12	0	6	559	302	257	42
4	Heidelberger TV	18	11	1	6	403	287	116	39
5	TSV Handschuhsheim II	18	9	1	8	462	354	108	37
6	München RFC	18	9	1	8	333	393	-60	33
7	RG Heidelberg II	18	6	0	12	358	473	-115	30
8	RC Aachen	18	4	0	14	242	518	-276	26
9	StuSta München	18	3	0	15	158	525	-367	19
10	RU Marburg	18	2	0	16	192	786	-594	15

- Promoted to Bundesliga: RK Heusenstamm
- Relegated from Bundesliga: none
- Relegated from 2nd Bundesliga: RC Aachen, RU Marburg
- Promoted to 2nd Bundesliga: Stuttgarter RC, RC Mainz

=== North/East ===
	Club	Played	Won	Drawn	Lost	Points for	Points against	Difference	Points
1	SC Germania List	14	13	0	1	522	108	414	40
2	RK 03 Berlin	14	11	0	3	543	99	444	36
3	SV Odin Hannover	14	9	0	5	251	214	37	32
4	TSV Victoria Linden	14	7	0	7	233	168	65	28
5	FC St Pauli Rugby	14	7	0	7	374	227	147	28
6	USV Potsdam	14	6	0	8	173	419	-246	26
7	Hamburger RC	14	2	0	12	121	555	-434	18
8	Stahl Brandenburg Rugby	14	1	0	13	105	532	-427	16

- Promoted to Bundesliga: none
- Relegated from Bundesliga: DSV 78/08 Ricklingen
- Relegated from 2nd Bundesliga: Stahl Brandenburg Rugby
- Promoted to 2nd Bundesliga: Berliner SV 92 Rugby
