= DSV 78/08 Ricklingen =

German rugby union club, based in Hannover

(Germany) DSV 78/08 Ricklingen
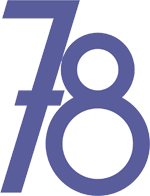
- Union: German Rugby Federation
- Founded: 1878 (DSV) 1908 (SV 08)
- Location: Hannover, Germany
- Chairman: (Germany) Günter Küster (DSV) (Germany) Matthias Freitag (SV 08)
- Coach: (Germany) Sven Gabbei
- League: 2nd Rugby-Bundesliga
- 2008-09: 1st
Team kit

The DSV 78/08 Ricklingen was a German rugby union team from the Ricklingen suburb of Hannover, playing in the 2nd Rugby-Bundesliga North/East in 2008-09. The team was an on-the-field union of DSV 78 Hannover and SV 1908 Ricklingen, two successful clubs in themselves. The two clubs continued to exist as separate entities.

In March 2009, the SV Ricklingen announced it would leave the union with the DSV 78 and not field a senior men's team in the future, instead concentrating on its youth program. This left the DSV 78 to field its own side in the Rugby-Bundesliga 2009-10.

== History ==
=== DSV 78 Hannover ===
DSV 78's traditional colors

The club was formed on 14 September 1878 as Deutschen Fußball-Verein Hannover gegründet 1878. Under the leadership of Ferdinand-Wilhelm Fricke, then only 15 years old, 24 young men formed the first football or rugby club in the country, a distinction was not made in Germany back then. The move was inspired by watching, and occasionally joining the players of the English Hannover Football-Club.

The first proper game of rugby however was not played until 1883, when "England" played "Germany" in Hannover on 17 October.

In 1899, Fricke discovered an ideal spot for the club to play at, Am Schnellen Graben, still the home of DFV today. A year later, the Verband Hannoverscher Fußball-Vereine (Association of Hanover football clubs) was formed and DFV won its first championship.

In 1909, the club adopted field hockey as another sport. In 1913, the DFV reached its first German championship final but lost to SC 1880 Frankfurt. Shortly after, the events of the First World War bring the activities of the club almost to a halt. Of the club members to lose their live in the war, Hermann Löns, "The Poet of the Heath", is the best known.

On 17 January 1927, the founding father of the club, F.W. Fricke, died. A year later, the club played in its second German final, and lost once more. In 1929, the club changed its name to Deutscher Sportverein Hannover gegründet 1878 e.V., reflecting the fact that it didn't play football but rugby.

During the Second World War, the clubs facilities suffered heavily from Allied bombing raids and in 1945, the clubhouse was in ruins.

In the post-war years, the DSV rebuilt its facilities and in 1949 it reopened its clubhouse.

On 7 June 1964, Germany's oldest rugby club finally earned its first German championship, beating FC St. Pauli 11-0 in Offenbach am Main.

78 won two more championships, in 1968 and 1970, before the Rugby-Bundesliga was established in 1971. The club was part of the new league but did not achieve highly in its first ten years.

Its fourth national championship came in 1982 when RG Heidelberg was beaten 15-6. The club was to play in seven championship finals in a row from then on, winning the first four and then losing three. With a year's interruption in 1989, the team returned for another championship in 1990. After another championship in 1991, DSV reached the final for the last time in 1993.

In the German Cup, the club continued to be successful, winning it in 1996 and 1998 and making final appearances in the two years after.

Up until the merger with SV 08 Ricklingen, the DSV 78 continued to be a top side in German rugby.

=== SV 08 Ricklingen ===
Logo of SV 08 Ricklingen

SV was formed on 6 August 1908, by twelve young men, as a rugby club. The club, for the most part, existed in the shadow of its local competitors, DSV 78, TSV Victoria Linden and its bitter rival DRC Hannover, also from the suburb of Ricklingen.

08, as the club is nicknamed, won three German championships and two cup wins during its history. The clubs first title came in 1950, when the final against SC Neuenheim was won. Ten years later, a second championship was won against TSV Handschuhsheim in 1960.

The team then took part in the newly established European Cup, where it met teams like SCA Brussels, AC Hilversum and ASPTT Rabat, travelling to Morocco to play the later.

In March 1964, Ricklingen played an historic match against the Dartmouth College Rugby Football Club from the sister town of Hanover, New Hampshire, which became the first American college team to play a rugby match in continental Europe. Ricklingen won that game 11-3 before a large gathering that included the Lord Mayor of Hannover.

Ricklingen was part of the new Rugby-Bundesliga when it was formed in 1971. The club suffered a harsh loss in its first Bundesliga season when the club house burned down.

Despite the loss of its long-time chairman Heinz Reinhotd in 1974, the club won its third German championship that season. Two players were still left in the team that had won the 1960 title as well.

Despite only finishing fourth in the Bundesliga North, the club reached the German final once more in 1992 after defeating RG Heidelberg and DSV 78 in the knock-out stage. Against TSV Victoria Linden, 08 was heavily outclassed in the final and lost 3-59.

In 1996, Ricklingen found itself in legal trouble with the German rugby association, the DRV. The reason was that the club had not played a Bundesliga game against VfR Döhren because the referee had not turned up. A long-drawn legal battle ended with the club being forcefully relegated from the Bundesliga in 1997.

After this forced relegation, the club lost a great number of players and was unable to return to former heights. After a number of seasons in the 2nd Bundesliga North/East it was decided to form an on-the-field union with DSV 78. After some initial skepticism, this is well accepted within the club now.

=== DSV 78/08 Ricklingen ===
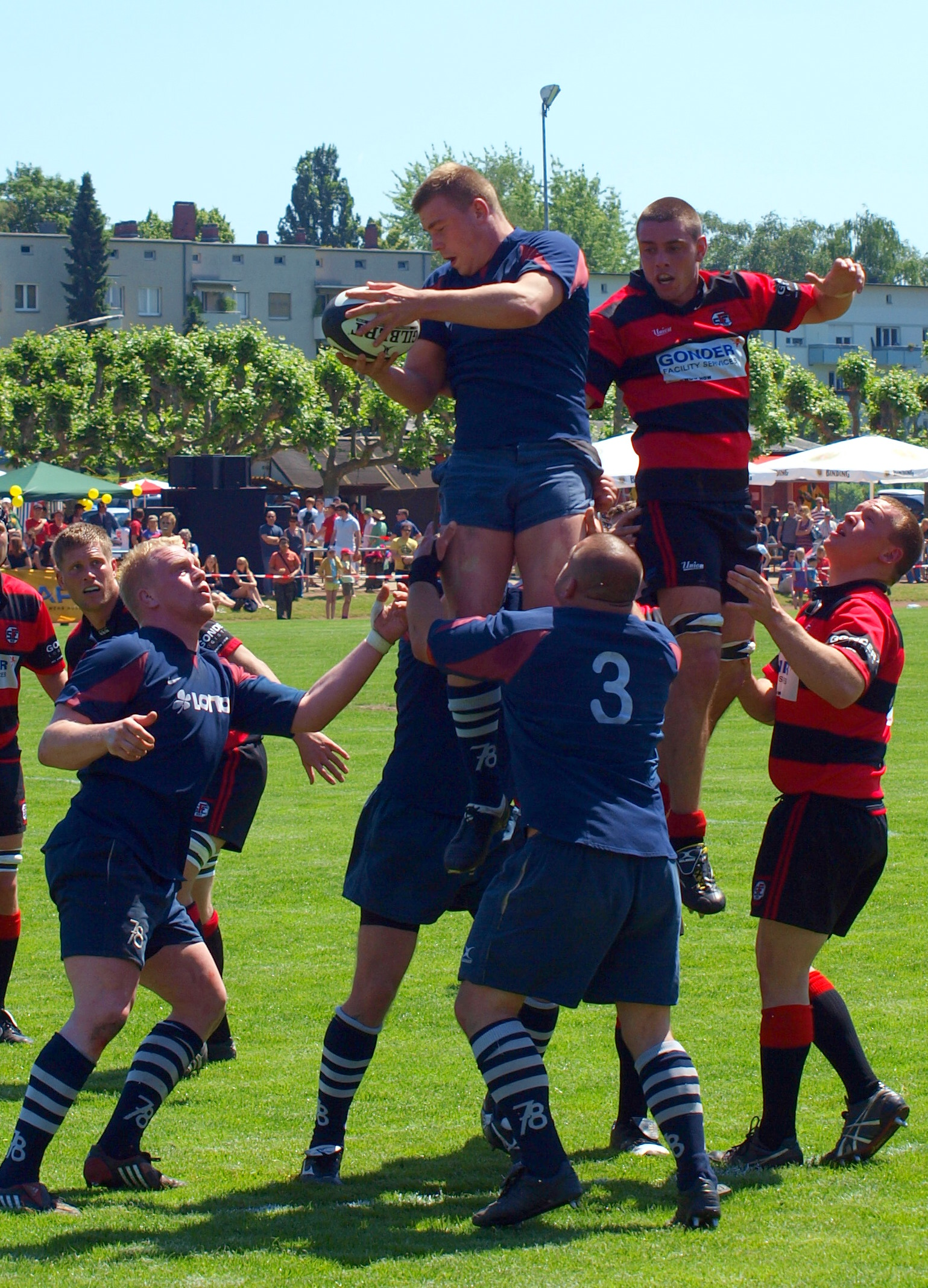
2nd Bundesliga Final 2009

The merger of the two teams brought the club little luck, suffering relegation from the Bundesliga in its first season. The team compensated for it in the following season by earning promotion back up.

DSV 78/08 could not achieve to establish itself in the first division, having to play against relegation and eventually dropping back down in 2007.

In 2007-08, back in the 2nd Bundesliga North/East, the team only finished fourth.

In its last season, 2008-09, the team had much improved and won the 2nd Rugby-Bundesliga North/East and a promotion to the Bundesliga. In May they played a final game for the 2nd Bundesliga championship against the South/East winners SC Frankfurt 1880 II. They lost 24:10.

With Benjamin Krause and Rafael Pyrasch, the club had two players called up for the Germany national rugby union team in 2008, the only German second division side to do so. During the final championship game in 2009 these players were not available since they played at the London Sevens for the German Sevens-Rugby national Team.

== Club honours ==
=== DSV 78 Hannover ===
- German rugby union championship
  - Champions: 1964, 1968, 1970, 1982, 1983, 1984, 1985, 1990, 1991
  - Runners up: 1913, 1928, 1966, 1971, 1986, 1987, 1988, 1993
- German rugby union cup
  - Winner: 1969, 1972, 1974, 1979, 1981, 1983, 1984, 1985, 1990, 1996, 1998
  - Runners up: 1970, 1973, 1993, 1999, 2000

=== SV 08 Ricklingen ===
- German rugby union championship
  - Champions: 1950, 1960, 1974
  - Runners up: 1973, 1992
- German rugby union cup
  - Winner: 1970, 1978
  - Runners up: 1984, 1989

=== DSV 78/08 Ricklingen ===
- 2nd Bundesliga
  - Runners-up: 2005, 2009

== Recent seasons ==
=== DSV 78 Hannover ===
Year	Division	Position
1998-99	Rugby-Bundesliga North/East (I)	3rd
1998-99	Bundesliga championship round	4th
1999–2000	Rugby-Bundesliga North/East	3rd
1999–2000	Bundesliga championship round	4th
2000-01	Rugby-Bundesliga North/East	2nd
2000-01	Bundesliga championship round	6th
2001-02	Rugby-Bundesliga	6th
2002-03	Rugby-Bundesliga	3rd

=== SV 08 Ricklingen ===
Year	Division	Position
1998-99	2nd Rugby-Bundesliga North/East (II)	3rd
1998-99	Rugby-Bundesliga North/East qualification round	6th
1999–2000	2nd Rugby-Bundesliga North/East	5th
1999–2000	2nd Rugby-Bundesliga North/East qualification round	2nd
2000-01	2nd Rugby-Bundesliga North/East	4th
2000-01	2nd Rugby-Bundesliga North/East qualification round	2nd
2001-02	2nd Rugby-Bundesliga North/East	4th
2002-03	2nd Rugby-Bundesliga North/East	6th

=== DSV 78/08 Ricklingen ===
Year	Division	Position
2003-04	Rugby-Bundesliga (I)	8th
2004-05	2nd Rugby-Bundesliga North/East (II)	1st
2005-06	Rugby-Bundesliga (I)	7th
2006-07	Rugby-Bundesliga	8th
2007-08	2nd Rugby-Bundesliga North/East (II)	4th
2008-09	2nd Rugby-Bundesliga North/East	1st

- Until 2001, when the single-division Bundesliga was established, the season was divided in autumn and spring, a Vorrunde and Endrunde, whereby the top teams of the Rugby-Bundesliga would play out the championship while the bottom teams together with the autumn 2nd Bundesliga champion would play for Bundesliga qualification. The remainder of the 2nd Bundesliga teams would play a spring round to determine the relegated clubs. Where two placings are shown, the first is autumn, the second spring.

== Sources ==
- DSV 78/08 Ricklingen team info at totalrugby.de
- Tables and results of German rugby on rugbyweb.de
