= Hennigsdorf =

- Town
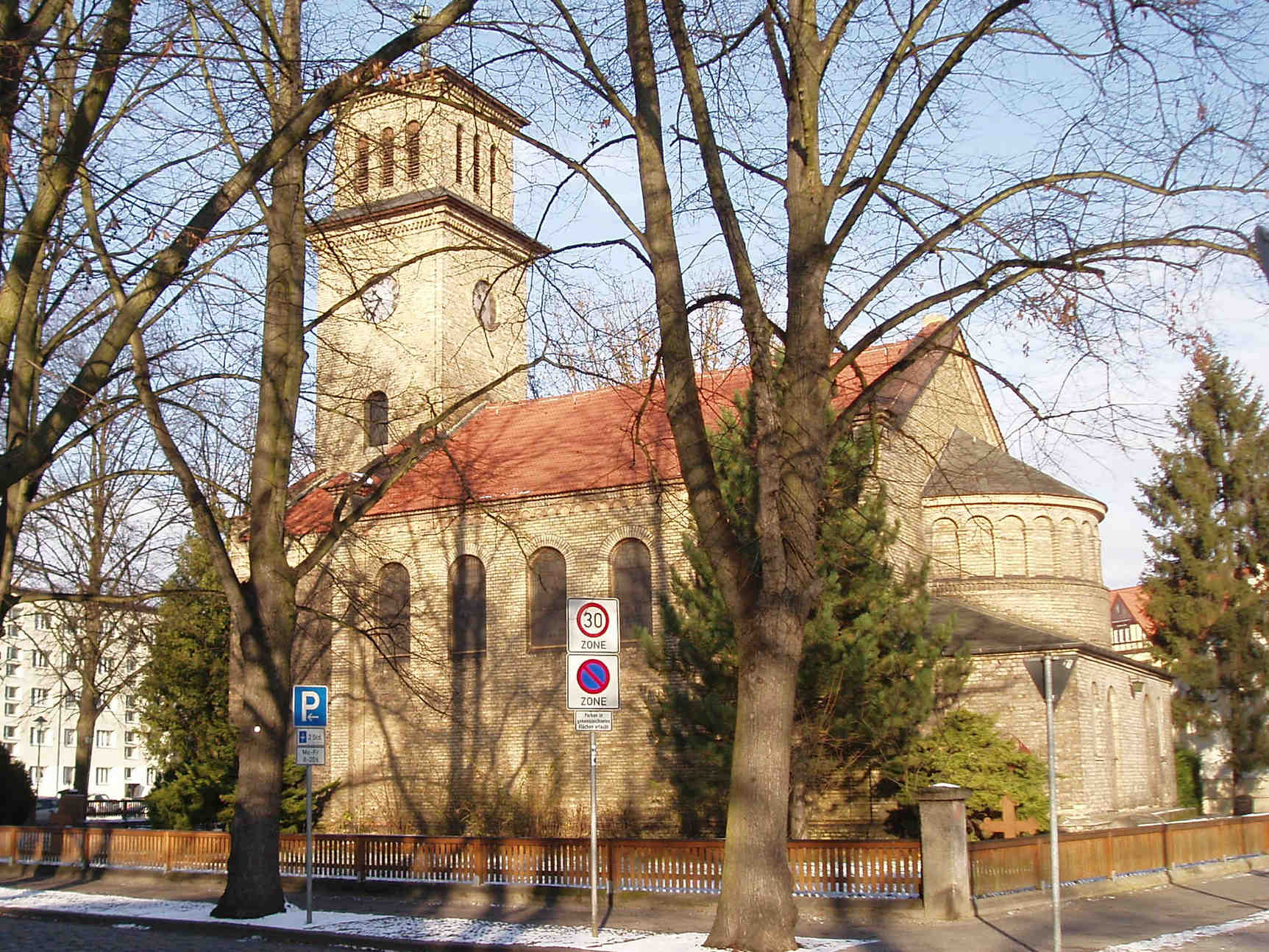
- Martin Luther Church

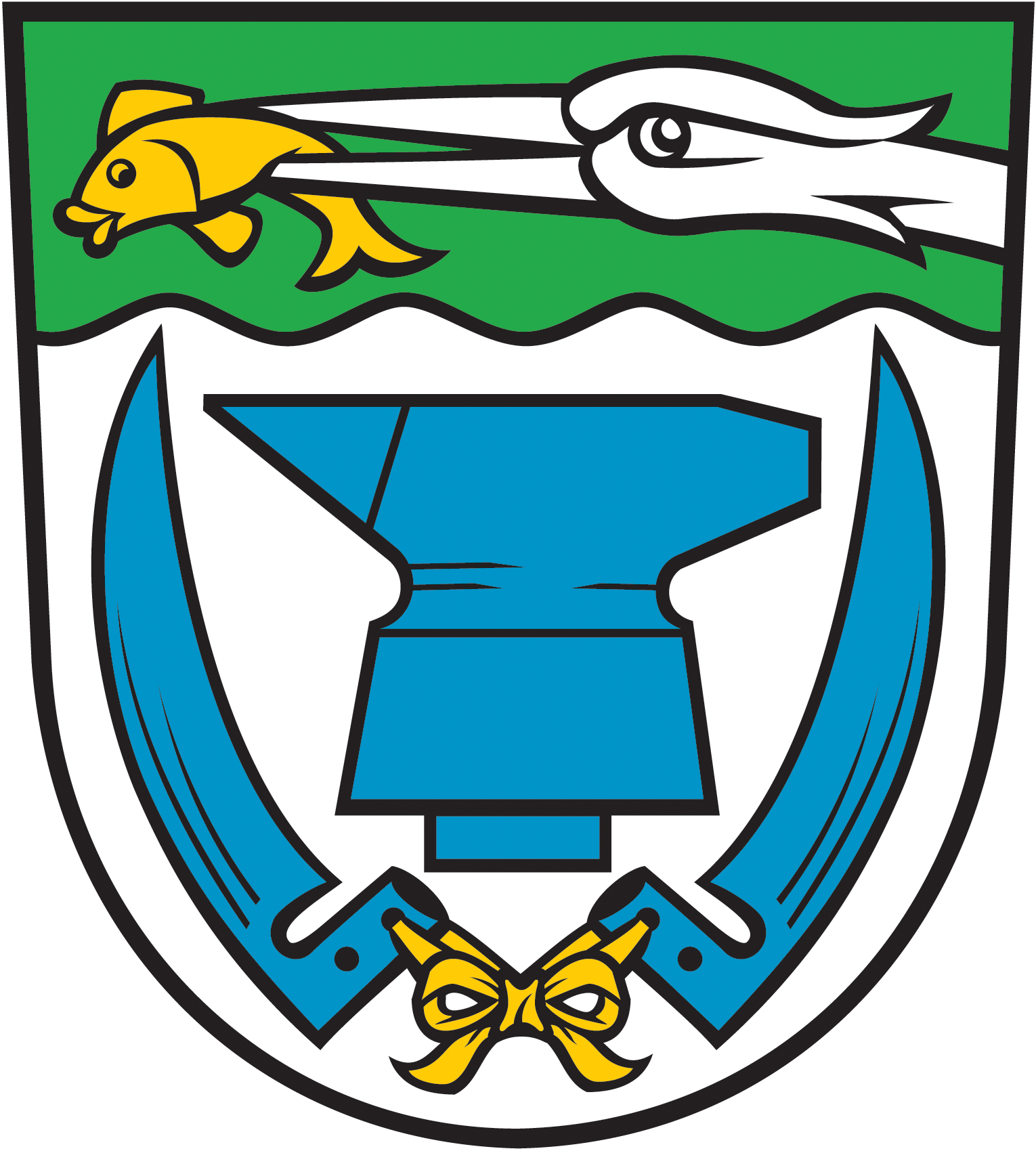
- Coat of arms

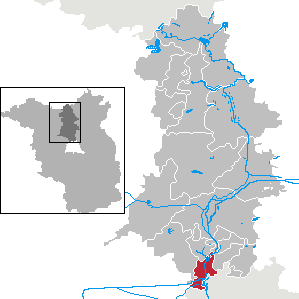
- Location of Hennigsdorf within Oberhavel district
- Interactive map of Hennigsdorf
- Location within Germany Location within Brandenburg
- Coordinates: 52°38′16″N 13°12′13″E
- Country: Germany
- State: Brandenburg
- District: Oberhavel
- Subdivisions: 3 districts

Government
  - Mayor (2017–25): Thomas Günther (SPD)

Area
  - Total: 31.47 km^{2} (12.15 sq mi)
- Elevation: 33 m (108 ft)

Population (2025-12-31)
  - Total: 26,602
  - Density: 845.3/km^{2} (2,189/sq mi)
- Time zone: UTC+01:00 (CET)
  - Summer (DST): UTC+02:00 (CEST)
- Postal codes: 16761
- Dialling codes: 03302
- Vehicle registration: OHV
- Website: www.hennigsdorf.de

Hennigsdorf (German pronunciation: [ˈhɛnɪçsˌdɔʁf]) is a town in the district of Oberhavel, in Brandenburg, in eastern Germany. It is situated north-west of Berlin, just across the city border, which is formed mainly by the Havel river.

== History ==
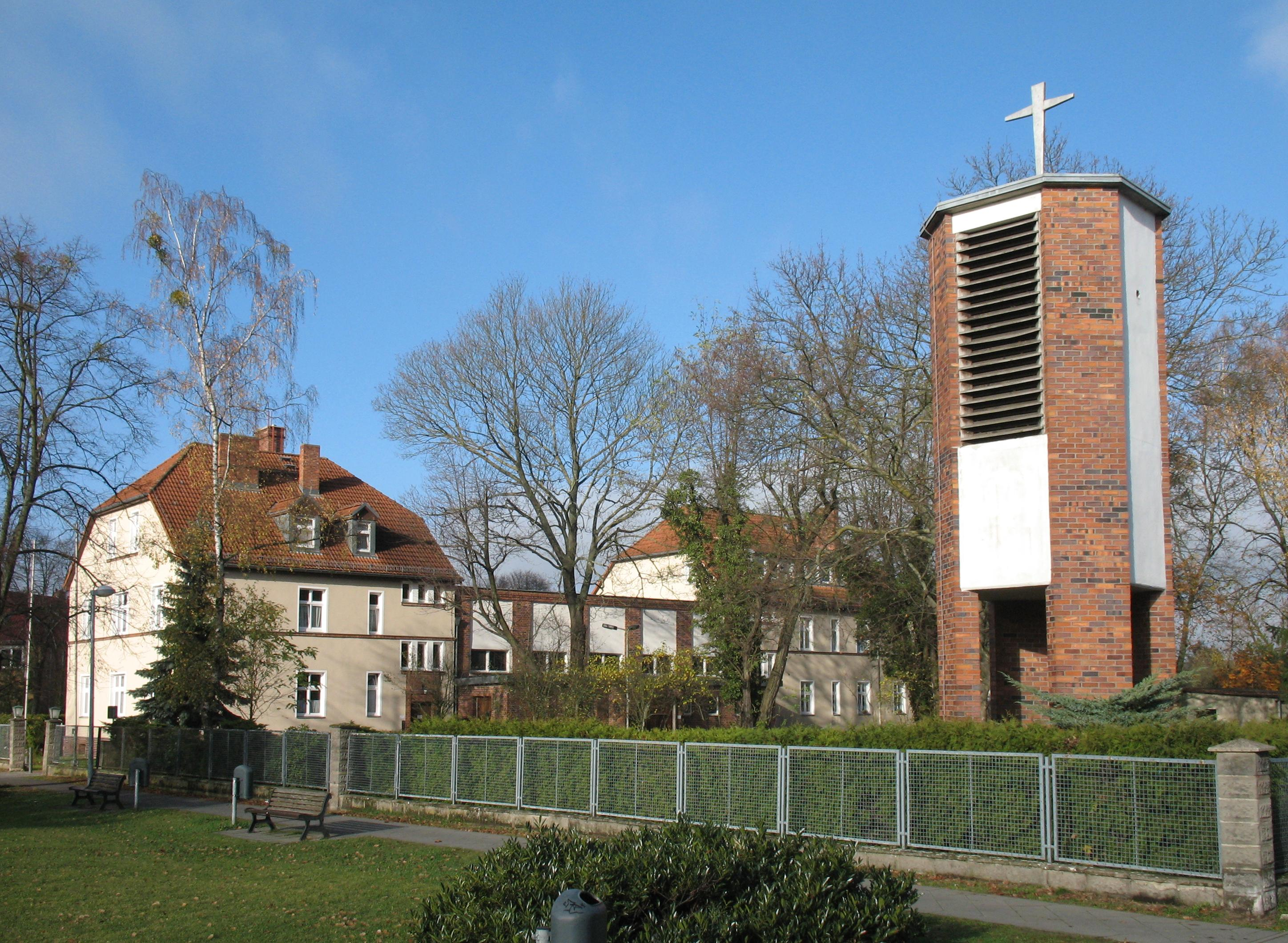
Catholic church

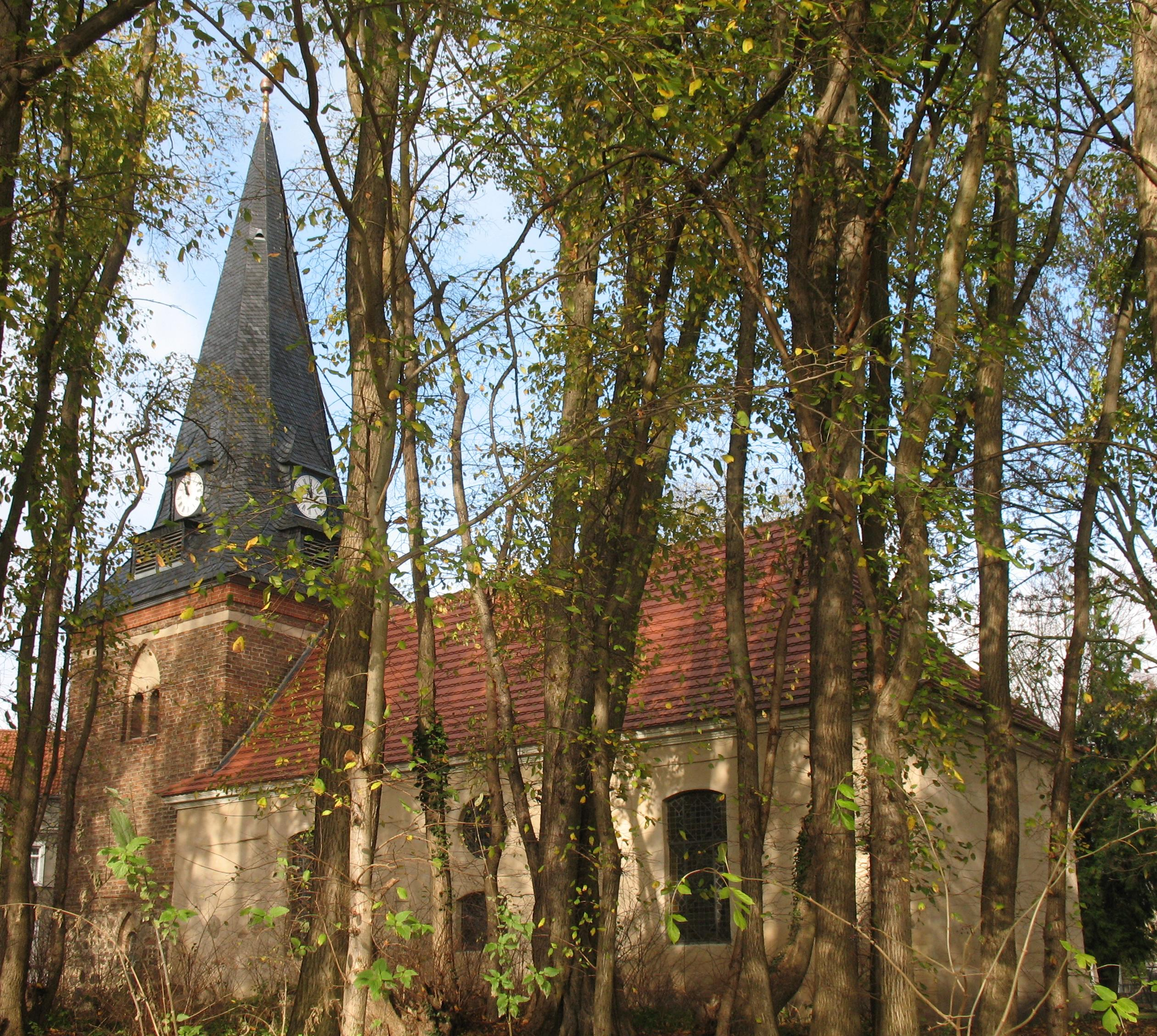
Church in Nieder Neuendorf

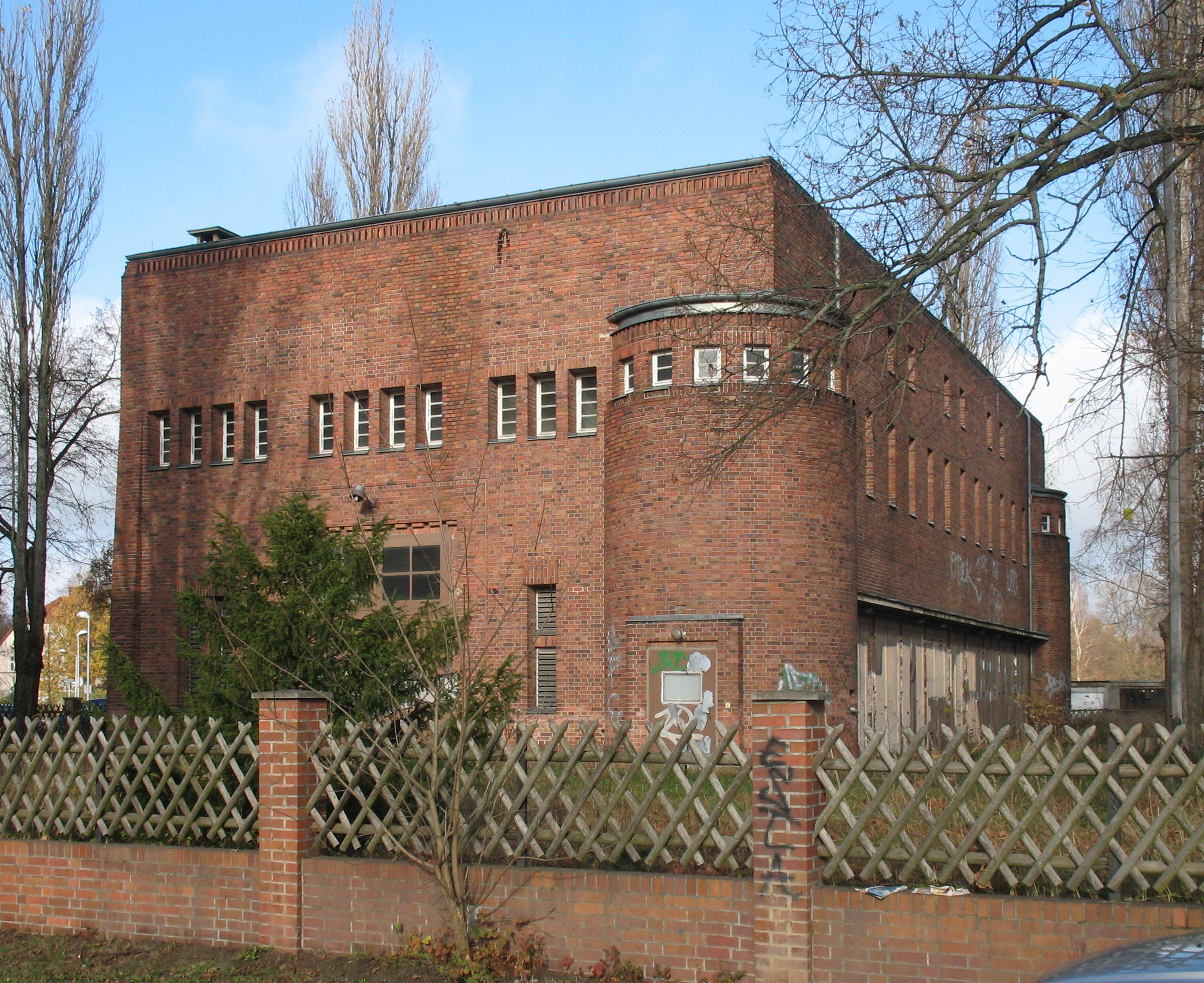
Former rectifier station

The town was first mentioned in 1375, when it was part of the Bohemian Crown. Afterwards it was part of the Margraviate of Brandenburg, then of the Kingdom of Prussia from 1701, and of the German Empire from 1871. During World War II, in 1944, a subcamp of the Sachsenhausen concentration camp was established, in which some 650 women, mostly Polish, were imprisoned and subjected to forced labour. In April 1945, the subcamp was dissolved and the surviving prisoners were sent on a death march to the Ravensbrück concentration camp.

After the war, it formed part of East Germany. The municipality shared its borders with the former West Berlin, and so during the period 1961–1990 it was separated from it by the Berlin Wall.

In 1951/2, the Havel Canal was constructed to link Hennigsdorf with Paretz, thus avoiding a passage through the reach of the River Havel, between Spandau and Potsdam, that was under the political control of West Berlin. The canal is still in use, providing a shorter route for shipping from west of Berlin to the Oder–Havel Canal and Poland.

== Geography ==
=== Subdivision ===
Hennigsdorf consists of 3 districts:

- Hennigsdorf
- Nieder Neuendorf (since 1923)
- Stolpe-Süd (since May 1, 1998)

=== Neighbouring places ===
- Velten
- Hohen Neuendorf
- Berlin
- Schönwalde-Glien
- Oberkrämer

== Twin towns – sister cities ==
Hennigsdorf is twinned with:

- Alsdorf, Germany
- Choisy-le-Roi, France
- Kralupy nad Vltavou, Czech Republic
- Środa Wielkopolska, Poland

== Economy ==
Located in Hennigsdorf is the (Bombardier until 2021) Stadler LEW Hennigsdorf train factory and a steel smelter.

== Sport ==
Hennigsdorf is home to Stahl Hennigsdorf Rugby, a rugby union club. The team, formed in 1948 under the leadership of Erwin Thiesies, was the most successful side during the East German era of the town, having won 27 national championships from 1952 to 1990.

== Demography ==
Development of population since 1875 within the current boundaries (blue line: population; dotted line: comparison to population development of Brandenburg state; grey background: time of Nazi rule; red background: time of communist rule)

Recent population development (blue line) and forecasts

Hennigsdorf: Population development
within the current boundaries (2013)

Year	Pop.	±% p.a.
1875	863	—
1890	1,178	+2.10%
1910	2,764	+4.36%
1925	7,914	+7.26%
1933	10,503	+3.60%
1939	13,383	+4.12%
1946	13,671	+0.30%
1950	16,611	+4.99%
1964	21,160	+1.74%
1971	25,093	+2.47%
1981	28,155	+1.16%
1985	27,788	−0.33%
1989	25,770	−1.87%
1990	25,062	−2.75%
1991	24,737	−1.30%

Year	Pop.	±% p.a.
1992	24,573	−0.66%
1993	24,505	−0.28%
1994	24,482	−0.09%
1995	24,528	+0.19%
1996	24,349	−0.73%
1997	24,637	+1.18%
1998	25,472	+3.39%
1999	26,197	+2.85%
2000	26,306	+0.42%
2001	26,390	+0.32%
2002	26,435	+0.17%
2003	26,282	−0.58%
2004	26,142	−0.53%
2005	26,139	−0.01%
2006	26,007	−0.50%

Year	Pop.	±% p.a.
2007	25,891	−0.45%
2008	25,729	−0.63%
2009	25,900	+0.66%
2010	25,909	+0.03%
2011	25,597	−1.20%
2012	25,704	+0.42%
2013	25,800	+0.37%
2014	25,928	+0.50%
2015	26,264	+1.30%
2016	26,139	−0.48%
2017	26,369	+0.88%
2018	26,272	−0.37%
2019	26,345	+0.28%
2020	26,559	+0.81%

== Notable people ==
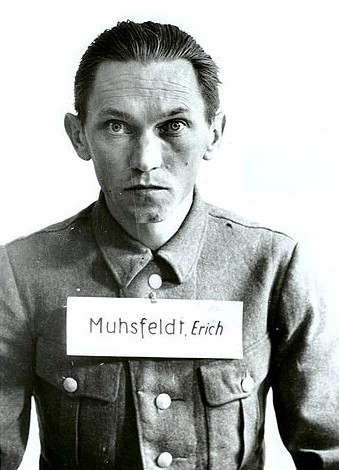
Erich Muhsfeldt

- Michael Hartmann (born 1974), footballer
- Frank Klawonn (born 1966), rower
- Dirk Kummer (born 1966), actor, director, writer
- Martin Männel (born 1988), footballer
- Erich Muhsfeldt (1913–1948), SS officer at Auschwitz and Majdanek concentration camps executed for war crimes
- Erich Priebke (1913–2013), Nazi war criminal
- Karsten Schmeling (born 1962), rower
- Erwin Thiesies (1908–1993), rugby union player who died in Hennigsdorf

== See also ==
- LEW Hennigsdorf, large rail vehicle factory located in Hennigsdorf
