= Stahl Brandenburg Rugby =

German rugby union club, based in Brandenburg

(Germany) Stahl Brandenburg Rugby
- Full name: SG Stahl Brandenburg Rugby
- Union: German Rugby Federation
- Founded: 1950; 76 years ago (club); 1959; 67 years ago (rugby department)
- Location: Brandenburg, Germany
- Ground: Medizinsportplatz
- Chairman: Michael Domke
- Coach: Torsten Busse
- Captain: Sebastian Pfeiffer
- League: Rugby-Regionalliga East
- 2014–15: 6th

Official website
- rugby-brandenburg-havel.de

Stahl Brandenburg Rugby is a German rugby union club from Brandenburg, currently playing in the Rugby-Regionalliga East A.

The club, located in former East Germany, used to be part of the BSG Stahl Brandenburg, a multi-sports club formed in November 1950. Stahl was home, apart from rugby, to a football department, now the FC Stahl Brandenburg, as well as a large number of other sports. Stahl, German for steel, took its name from its association with the local steelworks.

== History ==
Rugby union came first to the city of Brandenburg in 1958, when an international between the German Democratic Republic and Romania was played there.

The following year, in 1959, a rugby department was formed at the Thälmannwerft, a shipbuilding company, as part of the BSG Motor Nord. The Thälmannwerft, and BSG Motor Nord, were closed in 1961-62 and the rugby players moved to the BSG Stahl Brandenburg.

The team took part in the East German rugby union championship without actually winning a championship, coming closest in 1988, when it finished runners-up to Stahl Hennigsdorf. The club also managed to provide five players to the East Germany national team.

With the German reunion, the club lost many players and was in real danger of having to close its rugby department, but managed to avoid this drastic step.

The team competed at third-tier level in the following years, the local division of the Rugby-Regionalliga, until 2000, when a second place in the league and a good performance in the promotion round meant qualification to the tier-two 2nd Rugby-Bundesliga North/East.

Stahl suffered relegation from this league in 2002 but returned in 2005 after a championship in the Regionalliga. It played two more seasons in the 2nd Bundesliga before returning to the Rugby-Regionalliga East A again in 2007, where it plays today.

== Club honours ==
- East German rugby union championship
  - Runners up: 1988
- Rugby-Regionalliga East A
  - Champions: 2005

== Recent seasons ==
Recent seasons of the club:

| Year | Division | Position |
|---|---|---|
| 1999–2000 | | |
| 1999–2000 | 2nd Rugby-Bundesliga North/East relegation round | 9th — Promoted |
| 2000–01 | 2nd Rugby-Bundesliga North/East (II) | 6th |
| 2000–01 | 2nd Rugby-Bundesliga North/East relegation round | 3rd |
| 2001–02 | 2nd Rugby-Bundesliga North/East | 8th — Relegated |
| 2002–03 | | |
| 2003–04 | Rugby-Regionalliga East (North) (III) | 3rd |
| 2003–04 | Placings round 1 | 2nd |
| 2004–05 | Rugby-Regionalliga East A | 4th |
| 2004–05 | North/East championship round | 1st — promoted |
| 2005–06 | 2nd Rugby-Bundesliga North/East (II) | 5th |
| 2006–07 | 2nd Rugby-Bundesliga North/East | 8th — Relegated |
| 2007–08 | Rugby-Regionalliga East A (III) | 5th |
| 2008–09 | Rugby-Regionalliga East A | 4th |
| 2009–10 | Rugby-Regionalliga East (III) | 4th |
| 2009–10 | Rugby-Regionalliga East A | 4th |
| 2010–11 | Rugby-Regionalliga East | 5th |
| 2011–12 | Rugby-Regionalliga East | 10th |
| 2012–13 | Rugby-Regionalliga East | 5th |
| 2013–14 | Rugby-Regionalliga East | 6th |
| 2014–15 | Rugby-Regionalliga East | 6th |
| 2015–16 | Rugby-Regionalliga East | |
