= 2014–15 Rugby-Bundesliga =

- Countries: Germany
- Champions: Heidelberger RK (12th title)
- Promoted: none
- Relegated: TSV Victoria Linden SG Siemensstadt/Grizzlies Berliner SV 92 Rugby RC Aachen Heidelberger TV

The 2014–15 Rugby-Bundesliga was the 44th edition of this competition and the 95th edition of the German rugby union championship. In the Rugby-Bundesliga, twenty-one teams played in, initially, four regional divisions, the first stage of the competition, followed by a championship round of sixteen clubs and, finally, the play-offs consisting of twelve teams. The season started on 30 August 2014 and finished with the championship final on 16 May 2015 in Heidelberg, interrupted by a winter break from December to late February. Nominally the league should consist of twenty-four teams however only twenty-one fulfilled the licensing requirements for 2014–15.

The defending champions were Heidelberger RK who defeated TV Pforzheim in the 2014 final to take out its tenth championship and fifth in a row. Heidelberger RK remained unbeaten throughout the 2013–14 regular season, as it had been all throughout the 2012–13 Rugby-Bundesliga season, having last lost in the Bundesliga on 1 November 2011, when HRK was beaten 26–24 by TV Pforzheim. Heidelberg took out its sixth consecutive title and twelfth overall when it defeated Pforzheim 53–27 in the final once more, capping another season without defeat. The club thereby also equaled a championship record, becoming the second club after Victoria Linden to win six consecutive titles.

It was to be the last edition with twenty four clubs as the annual general meeting of the DRV in July 2015 decided to reduce the league to sixteen clubs from the 2015–16 season onwards.

== Overview ==
Location of teams in the Rugby-Bundesliga 2014-15

The league saw only minor changes compare to the previous season, having played at full strength of 24 clubs in 2013–14 instead of only 21 in 2014–15. The 08 Ricklingen/Wunstorf withdrew from the league during the 2013–14 season, while TuS 95 Düsseldorf, RC Mainz, Veltener RC and USV Potsdam Rugby were relegated from the competition. New in the league were RU Hohen Neuendorf and SG Siemensstadt/Grizzlies.

The first stage of the competition, the Vorrunde, nominally saw four six-team groupes in which each team played the other five just once, however the western group played with only four temas and the northern group with only five. This stage finished in late September after which the second stage started, the Qualifikationsphase, in which the top teams each from the southern and the western group play each other in one group while the top teams from the north and east play each other in another. The fourth placed team from each division would play the fifth placed in the opposite group to determine the last two places in the second round. The five teams not qualified for the Qualifikationsphase entered the DRV-Pokal, the German rugby union cup, together with the top eight teams of the 2. Bundesliga. The 2. Bundesliga teams not qualified for the DRV-Pokal in turn played for the Liga Pokal.

In the second stage the teams within a group would play each other in a home-and-away format, with the teams that already played each other in the first stage carrying over those results. Of the sixteen clubs the best six in each group now qualified for the knock-out stage. The knock-out stage was played in a single-game format with the higher seeded team enjoying home advantage and the winner advancing to the next round.

== Bundesliga tables & results ==
=== First stage ===
In the first stage twenty-one clubs played in four groups. Within each group each team played the other just once. The best three teams advanced directly to the second stage while the teams placed fourth and fifth had to play a qualifying decider.

==== North ====
The division table:

	Club	Played	W	D	L	PF	PA	Diff	BP	Points
1	DSV 78 Hannover	4	4	0	0	193	35	158	4	20
2	SC Germania List	4	2	0	2	165	79	86	5	13
3	FC St. Pauli Rugby	4	2	0	2	75	137	–62	1	9
4	Hamburger RC	4	1	0	3	57	136	–79	1	5
5	TSV Victoria Linden	4	1	0	3	54	157	–103	0	4

- Relegated: TSV Victoria Linden
- Promoted: none

==== East ====
The division table:

	Club	Played	W	D	L	PF	PA	Diff	BP	Points
1	RK 03 Berlin	5	5	0	0	286	32	254	4	24
2	Berliner Rugby Club	5	4	0	1	164	29	135	5	21
3	SG Siemensstadt/Grizzlies	5	3	0	2	118	123	–5	2	10
4	RU Hohen Neuendorf	5	2	0	3	87	146	–59	2	10
5	Berliner SV 92 Rugby	5	1	0	4	43	256	–213	0	4
6	RC Leipzig	5	0	0	5	57	169	–112	1	1

- Relegated: SG Siemensstadt/Grizzlies, Berliner SV 92 Rugby
- Promoted: none

==== West ====
The division table:

	Club	Played	W	D	L	PF	PA	Diff	BP	Points
1	RK Heusenstamm	3	3	0	0	159	20	139	3	15
2	SC 1880 Frankfurt	3	2	0	1	101	64	37	2	10
3	ASV Köln Rugby	3	1	0	2	28	98	–71	0	4
4	RC Aachen	3	0	0	3	25	131	–106	0	0

- Relegated: RC Aachen
- Promoted: none

==== South ====
The division table:

	Club	Played	W	D	L	PF	PA	Diff	BP	Points
1	Heidelberger RK	5	5	0	0	346	8	338	5	25
2	TV Pforzheim	5	4	0	1	291	90	201	4	18
3	RG Heidelberg	5	3	0	2	97	166	–69	2	14
4	SC Neuenheim	5	2	0	3	122	127	–5	2	10
5	TSV Handschuhsheim	5	1	0	4	57	198	–141	1	5
6	Heidelberger TV	5	0	0	5	28	352	–324	0	–4

- Relegated: Heidelberger TV
- Promoted: none
- SG Siemensstadt/Grizzlies and Heidelberger TV deducted four points, TV Pforzheim deducted two points for lack of mandatory youth program.

=== Qualifying matches ===
Three qualifying matches were held to determine the last three clubs to enter the second stage. Nominally the fourth placed club in the southern division played the fifth placed team in the western division and the fourth placed western club the fifth placed southern team. However, as the western division had only four clubs the fourth placed team in the south received a bye and direct entry into the championship round. The same system applied to the northern and eastern division where the league strength required both games to take place. The winners of the three games advanced to the second stage while the losers had to enter the DRV-Pokal.

==== North-East ====
11 October 2014

Hamburger RC	94 – 6	Berliner SV 92

11 October 2014

RU Hohen Neuendorf	33 – 27	TSV Victoria Linden

==== South-West ====
12 October 2014

RC Aachen	0 – 52	TSV Handschuhsheim

=== Second stage ===
In the second stage sixteen clubs played in two groups of eight clubs each. Within each group each team played the others home and away except for the match-ups that already had been played in the first round. The results of those were carried over. The best six teams in each group qualified for the play-offs and were seeded according to the final standings. The second round concluded on 18 April 2015 and was followed by the play-offs.

==== North-East ====
The division table:

	Club	Played	W	D	L	PF	PA	Diff	BP	Points
1	DSV 78 Hannover	12	12	0	0	703	94	609	12	60
2	RK 03 Berlin	12	9	0	3	437	193	244	7	43
3	SC Germania List	12	7	0	5	346	281	65	11	39
4	Berliner Rugby Club	12	6	0	6	260	280	-20	8	32
5	Hamburger RC	12	5	0	7	200	371	-171	2	22
6	FC St. Pauli Rugby	12	3	0	9	179	418	-239	1	13
7	RU Hohen Neuendorf	12	0	0	12	76	564	-488	1	1

- SG Siemensstadt/Grizzlies failed to field in two consecutive games and was removed from the competition in April 2015.

==== South-West ====
The division table:

	Club	Played	W	D	L	PF	PA	Diff	BP	Points
1	Heidelberger RK	14	14	0	0	1,038	93	945	14	70
2	TV Pforzheim	14	12	0	2	800	203	597	13	59
3	SC Neuenheim	14	9	0	5	374	284	90	5	41
4	RG Heidelberg	14	8	0	6	343	397	-54	6	38
5	TSV Handschuhsheim	14	5	0	9	203	445	-242	5	25
6	RK Heusenstamm	14	4	0	10	322	454	-132	8	24
7	SC 1880 Frankfurt	14	4	0	10	193	634	-441	4	20
8	ASV Köln Rugby	14	0	0	14	95	858	-763	0	0

- TV Pforzheim deducted two points.

=== Play-off stage ===
In the play-offs the twelve qualified teams played four rounds. The best two clubs in each division received a bye for the first round and entered in the quarter-finals stage. The first round was played on 25 April, the quarter-finals were held on 2 May and the semi-finals on 9 May. The final of the German championship was held on 16 May:

First Round; 25 April
SC Neuenheim	83
Hamburger RC	3
Berliner Rugby Club	0
RK Heusenstamm	49
SC Germania List	20
TSV Handschuhsheim	24
RG Heidelberg	78
FC St. Pauli Rugby	0

Quarterfinals; 2 May
DSV 78 Hannover	21
SC Neuenheim	42
TV Pforzheim	47
RK Heusenstamm	14
Heidelberger RK	104
TSV Handschuhsheim	0
RK 03 Berlin	14
RG Heidelberg	23

Semifinals; 10 May
TV Pforzheim	41
SC Neuenheim	14
Heidelberger RK	55
RG Heidelberg	5

Final; 16 May
TV Pforzheim	27
Heidelberger RK	53

== DRV-Pokal tables & results ==
The five worst clubs in the first stage of the Bundesliga entered the DRV-Pokal for 2014–15, together with the eight best clubs from the 2nd Rugby-Bundesliga. The DRV-Pokal ranks as a second tier to the German championship but also functioned as a qualifying competition for the 2015–16 Rugby-Bundesliga. The modus for the DRV-Pokal was the same as for the German championship, with a second stage with two divisions of, nominally, eight teams, followed by the play-offs made up of the best twelve teams, with the top two in each division receiving a bye for the first round.

=== Group stage ===
==== North-East ====
The division table:

	Club	Played	W	D	L	PF	PA	Diff	BP	Points
1	RC Leipzig^{‡}	12	10	1	1	524	146	378	11	53
2	DSV 78 Hannover II	12	9	0	3	424	140	284	7	43
3	TSV Victoria Linden^{‡}	12	8	1	3	332	189	143	8	42
4	Berliner SV 92 Rugby^{‡}	12	5	0	7	189	434	-245	3	23
5	Veltener RC	12	4	0	8	201	342	–141	5	21
6	Bremen 1860	12	4	0	8	245	285	–40	4	20
7	Berliner Rugby Club II	12	1	0	11	91	470	–379	1	3

- Berliner Rugby Club II two points deducted.

==== South-West ====
The division table:

	Club	Played	W	D	L	PF	PA	Diff	BP	Points
1	Heidelberger TV^{‡}	10	9	0	1	388	105	283	8	40
2	RC Rottweil	10	8	0	2	260	79	181	6	38
3	RC Luxembourg	10	5	0	5	178	228	-50	3	23
4	RC Aachen^{‡}	10	3	1	6	208	215	-7	5	19
5	StuSta München	10	3	1	6	203	254	-51	2	16
6	TGS Hausen	10	1	0	9	93	449	-356	1	1

- ^{‡} Denotes 2014–15 Bundesliga club.
- Heidelberger TV and TGS Hausen deducted four points.

=== Play-off stage ===
The 2014–15 final was played on 23 May 2014 in Heidelberg. The play-offs for the DRV-Pokal started on 25 April 2015:

First Round; 25 April
RC Luxembourg	50
Veltener RC	0
Berliner SV 92 Rugby	40
TGS Hausen	15
RC Aachen	38
Bremen 1860	10
TSV Victoria Linden	10
StuSta München	17

Quarterfinals; 2 May
RC Leipzig	27
RC Luxembourg	19
RC Rottweil	60
Berliner SV 92 Rugby	0
DSV 78 Hannover II	24
RC Aachen	17
Heidelberger TV	41
StuSta München	20

Semifinals; 9 May
RC Leipzig	5
RC Rottweil	17
Heidelberger TV	20
DSV 78 Hannover II	0

Final; 23 May
RC Rottweil	12
Heidelberger TV	30

- Veltener RC did not field against RC Luxembourg, game awarded to Luxembourg.
