= Friedrich Michau =

- Born: Friedrich Michau; 26 July 1979 (age 47)
- Height: 1.73 m (5 ft 8 in)
- Weight: 79 kg (12 st 6 lb)

Rugby union career
- Position: Fly-half
Amateur team(s)
Years	Team	Apps	(Points)
- FC St. Pauli Rugby
2004	DRC Hannover		
2004 -	FC St. Pauli Rugby		
- Correct as of 30 March 2010
International career
Years	Team	Apps	(Points)
- Germany
- Correct as of 30 March 2010

Friedrich Michau (born 26 July 1979) is a German international rugby union player, playing for the FC St. Pauli Rugby in the 2nd Rugby-Bundesliga and the German national rugby union team.

He made his last game for Germany on 28 April 2007 against the Netherlands.

He is the captain of the FC St. Pauli rugby team.

== Honours ==
=== National team ===
- European Nations Cup - Division 2
  - Champions: 2008

== Stats ==
Friedrich Michau's personal statistics in club and international rugby:

=== Club ===
Year	Club	Division	Games	Tries	Con	Pen	DG	Place
2008-09	FC St. Pauli Rugby	2nd Rugby-Bundesliga						4th
2009-10	FC St. Pauli Rugby	2nd Rugby-Bundesliga	7	3	12	6	1	4th
2010-11	FC St. Pauli Rugby	2nd Rugby-Bundesliga	6	3	2	0	0	2nd
2011-12	FC St. Pauli Rugby	2nd Rugby-Bundesliga	12	11	5	1	1	1st - Promoted

- As of 30 April 2012

=== National team ===
Year	Team	Competition	Games	Points	Place
2006-2008	Germany	European Nations Cup Second Division	1	0	Champions

- As of 30 March 2010
