= RC Rottweil =

German rugby union club, based in Rottweil

(Germany) RC Rottweil
- Full name: Rugby-Club Rottweil e. V.
- Union: German Rugby Federation
- Founded: 1970; 56 years ago
- Location: Rottweil, Germany
- Chairman: Karl-Heinz Bahr
- League: 2. Rugby-Bundesliga (II)
- 2015–16: 2. Rugby-Bundesliga South, 6th
Team kit

Official website
- www.rcrottweil.de

The RC Rottweil is a German rugby union club from Rottweil, Baden-Württemberg, currently playing in the 2nd Rugby-Bundesliga.

== History ==
Rugby was established in Rottweil in 1969 when it was introduced by former German international Günther Thiel at a local school. In the following year RC Rottweil was formed, which entered the Rugby-Regionalliga in 1971 and won the league championship in its first season there. After another Regionalliga championship the following year Rottweil played in the Rugby-Bundesliga for a season in 1973–74 but was relegated again immediately.

RCR won another Regionalliga title in 1975 and once more moved up to the Bundesliga. While the club was able to avoid relegation this time around it found the travel expenses to high and voluntarily withdrew to the Regionalliga again in 1976. Three more Regionalliga titles followed before the club decided to move up to the Bundesliga again in 1979. Rottweil spend the next six seasons at this level, the most successful era in the club's history. It managed to qualify for the play-offs on three occasions, in 1981, 1982 and 1985 but each time was knocked out in the quarter finals by clubs from Hanover.

After an unsuccessful 1985–86 season the club was relegated from the Bundesliga once more but made a brief return in 1988. From 1992 to 1994 Rottweil played in the 2nd Rugby-Bundesliga, a new league slotted in between Bundesliga and Regionalliga. The club's fortunes declined from then on, neglecting its youth department and having to withdraw from league rugby altogether for a time. It restarted its youth program in 1996 and eventually was able to field a senior team again. From 2008 onwards RC Rottweil played in the Rugby-Regionalliga again and, in 2013, won promotion to the 2. Bundesliga once more.

In 2013–14 and 2014–15 the club showed strong performances in the 2. Bundesliga, finishing runners-up to Heidelberger TV in the south west division each season and losing the 2014 DRV-Pokal final to the latter. In the 2014–15 season the club finished second in the south-west DRV-Pokal group and lost to Heidelberger TV in the final after a bye in the first round and victories over Berliner SV 92 Rugby and RC Leipzig.

== Honours ==
- DRV-Pokal
  - Finalist: 2014, 2015

== Recent seasons ==
Recent seasons of the club:

Year	Division	Tier	Position
2008–09	Rugby-Regionalliga Baden-Württemberg	III	7th
2009–10	Rugby-Regionalliga Baden-Württemberg	III	7th
2010–11	Rugby-Regionalliga Baden-Württemberg	IV	7th
2011–12	Rugby-Regionalliga Baden-Württemberg	IV	3rd — Promoted
2012–13	3rd Liga South/West	III	2nd — Promoted
2013–14	2. Rugby-Bundesliga qualification round – South	II	1st
2013–14	DRV-Pokal – South-West	II	2nd — Runners-up
2014–15	2. Rugby-Bundesliga qualification round – South	II	1st
2014–15	DRV-Pokal – South-West	II	2nd — Runners-up
2015–16	2nd Rugby-Bundesliga South	II	6th

- Until 2001, when the single-division Bundesliga was established, the season was divided in autumn and spring, a Vorrunde and Endrunde, whereby the top teams of the Rugby-Bundesliga would play out the championship while the bottom teams together with the autumn 2nd Bundesliga champion would play for Bundesliga qualification. The remainder of the 2nd Bundesliga teams would play a spring round to determine the relegated clubs. Where two placing's are shown, the first is autumn, the second spring. In 2012 the Bundesliga was expanded from ten to 24 teams and the 2nd Bundesliga from 20 to 24 with the leagues divided into four regional divisions.
