= RK Heusenstamm =

German rugby union club, based in Heusenstamm

(Germany) RK Heusenstamm
- Full name: Rugby-Klub Heusenstamm e.V.
- Union: German Rugby Federation
- Founded: 1979; 47 years ago
- Location: Heusenstamm, Germany
- Ground: Sportzentrum Martinsee (Capacity: 10,000)
- Chairman: Jürgen Zeiger
- Coach: Jens Steinweg
- Captain: Markus Walger
- League: Rugby-Bundesliga
- 2015–16: Rugby-Bundesliga South/West, 7th
Team kit

Official website
- www.rugby-klub.de

The RK Heusenstamm is a German rugby union club from Heusenstamm, currently playing in the Rugby-Bundesliga.

== History ==
The club was formed in 1979, much later than most other current Bundesliga clubs, in Heusenstamm, Hesse.

After relegation from the Rugby-Bundesliga in 2000, the club played in the 2nd Rugby-Bundesliga for a number of seasons.

The RKH's greatest success came in 2006, when it managed to take out the German sevens championship.

In 2007, the club achieved promotion back to the first division through winning its league and a subsequent 52–10 victory over the North/East champion SC Germania List.

The following season, 2007-08, the team finished last in the Bundesliga but was saved from relegation by the decision to expand the league from 8 to 9 teams for 2008-09.

In the 2008–09 season, the team lived a separate existence from the six clubs contending for the four final spots as well as the two strugglers at the end of the table, clearly removed in points from both groups in seventh place.

In 2010–11, the club, coming last, was only saved from relegation because only one team opted for Bundesliga promotion, with the league expanded from nine to ten clubs.

A league reform in 2012 allowed the club to remain in the Bundesliga after initially being relegated as the league was expanded from ten to 24 teams. RK finished second in their group in the 2012–13 season and qualified for the south/west division of the championship round, where it came sixth. The club was knocked out in the first round of the play-offs after losing 45–34 to RK 03 Berlin.

In 2013–14 the team qualified for the championship and the play-offs once more, losing 33–19 to RK 03 Berlin in the first round and being knocked out. In the 2014–15 season the club finished sixth in the south-west championship group and was knocked out by TV Pforzheim in the quarter-finals of the play-offs after a first round victory over Berliner Rugby Club.

== Club honours ==
- German sevens championship
  - Champions: 2006
  - Runners-up: 2005, 2009
- 2nd Rugby-Bundesliga
  - Champions: 2007

== Recent seasons ==
Recent seasons of the club:

=== Men ===
Year	Division	Position
1998-99	Rugby-Bundesliga South/West (I)	6th
1998-99	Bundesliga qualification round	2nd
1999-2000	Rugby-Bundesliga South/West	6th
1999-2000	Bundesliga qualification round	4th — Relegated
2000-01	2nd Rugby-Bundesliga South/West (II)	1st
2000-01	Bundesliga qualification round	5th
2001-02	2nd Rugby-Bundesliga South/West (II)	4th
2002-03	2nd Rugby-Bundesliga South/West	3rd
2003-04	2nd Rugby-Bundesliga South/West	4th
2004-05	2nd Rugby-Bundesliga South/West	2nd
2005-06	2nd Rugby-Bundesliga South/West	2nd
2006-07	2nd Rugby-Bundesliga South/West	1st — Promoted
2007-08	Rugby-Bundesliga (I)	8th
2008-09	Rugby-Bundesliga	7th
2009–10	Rugby-Bundesliga	8th
2010–11	Rugby-Bundesliga	9th
2011–12	Rugby-Bundesliga	10th
2012–13	Rugby-Bundesliga qualification round – West	2nd
2012–13	Rugby-Bundesliga championship round – South-West	6th — Round of sixteen
2013–14	Rugby-Bundesliga qualification round – West	1st
2013–14	Rugby-Bundesliga championship round – South-West	5th — First round
2014–15	Rugby-Bundesliga qualification round – West	1st
2014–15	Rugby-Bundesliga championship round – South-West	6th — Quarter finals
2015–16	Rugby-Bundesliga South-West	7th

- Until 2001, when the single-division Bundesliga was established, the season was divided in autumn and spring, a Vorrunde and Endrunde, whereby the top teams of the Rugby-Bundesliga would play out the championship while the bottom teams together with the autumn 2nd Bundesliga champion would play for Bundesliga qualification. The remainder of the 2nd Bundesliga teams would play a spring round to determine the relegated clubs. Where two placing's are shown, the first is autumn, the second spring. In 2012 the Bundesliga was expanded from ten to 24 teams and the 2nd Bundesliga from 20 to 24 with the leagues divided into four regional divisions.

=== Women ===
Year	Division	Position
2004-05		
2005-06	Regionalliga West (III)	6th — Promoted
2006–07	Women's 2nd Rugby Bundesliga (II)	3rd
2007–08	Women's 2nd Rugby Bundesliga	4th
2008–09	Women's 2nd Rugby Bundesliga	7th — Relegated
2009–10	Regionalliga West (III)	

== Rugby internationals ==
In Germany's 2006–08 European Nations Cup campaign, the brothers Dennis and Markus Walger were called up for the national team.

In the 2008–10 campaign, Markus Walger was called up again.

In the 2010–12 campaign, no player from the club was selected for Germany.

The club had one player selected for the German under-18 team at the 2009 European Under-18 Rugby Union Championship, Sam Rainger . No player from RKH was called up for the 2010 tournament.
