= SC DHfK Leipzig =

Sports club in Leipzig, Germany

SC DHfK Leipzig e. V. (Sportclub Deutsche Hochschule für Körperkultur Leipzig e. V.) is a sports club in Leipzig, Germany. It was established in 1954 as a competitive sports club, initially under the name SC Wissenschaft DHfK Leipzig, and remained part of the East German sports university Deutsche Hochschule für Körperkultur (DHfK) until after the 1991 reunification of Germany when the sports university and its facilities then became Leipzig University's Faculty of Sport Science. The club has about 6,100 members (2024) and is the biggest in Leipzig.

== Successes ==
Measured by the number of medals won in Olympic Games and world championships, SC DHfK is the most successful sports club in the world. Its athletes were particularly successful in the disciplines of track and field, swimming, rowing, canoeing, handball and cycling. Until 1989, the club's athletes won 93 Olympic gold medals and 136 medals in world championships. Some of the most successful athletes were Gustav-Adolf Schur, Uwe Ampler, Klaus Köste, Christian Gille, Anett Schuck, Günther Merkel, Manfred Merkel, Angelika Bahmann, Margitta Gummel, Bärbel Eckert, Siegfried Brietzke, Thomas Munkelt and Kristin Otto.

== Departments ==
SC DHfK has the following departments:

- Canoeing
- Cycling
- Diving
- Finswimming
- Fistball
- Fitness and health
- Floorball
- Handball
- Judo
- Roller skating
- Rowing
- Running
- Skiing
- Swimming
- Synchronized swimming
- Track and field
- Triathlon
- Water polo
- Wheelchair sport

=== Handball ===
SC DHfK Leipzig Handball

=== Rowing ===
The rowing department was founded in 1866 as Ruder-Club Germania. On April 6 1919, the club joined Rudergesellschaft Wiking Leipzig. After 1945, some rowers left Leipzig and went to Minden in West Germany where the club continued to exist. Following the German reunification, the RG Wiking Leipzig of Minden joined SC DHfK Leipzig and existed under the name Rudergesellschaft Wiking im SC DHfK Leipzig e. V. until 2012.

The period after 1990 was marked by radical upheavals in the rowing department. The large coaching staff was reduced to three coaches, national and international successes declined drastically. After Olympic gold medals for Kristina Mundt and Kerstin Müller in 1992, SC DHfK athletes did not participate in Olympic Games until 2008 when Annekatrin Thiele won a silver medal in double sculls. At the 2012 Summer Olympics in London, Thiele again won a silver medal, this time in the women's quadruple sculls. She continued her winning streak with a gold medal in the same competition in Rio 2016. SC DHfK rowers Philipp Wende and Tim Grohmann also participated in the 2016 Olympics. Wende won a gold medal in the men's double sculls, Grohmann supported the team as a substitute.

==== Henley Royal Regatta ====
| Year | Races won |
|---|---|
| 1967 | Grand Challenge Cup |

=== Rugby ===
SC DHfK used to have a rugby union section, which won five East German championships between 1954 and 1963, see RC Leipzig.
