= Dennis Walger =

Germany international rugby union player

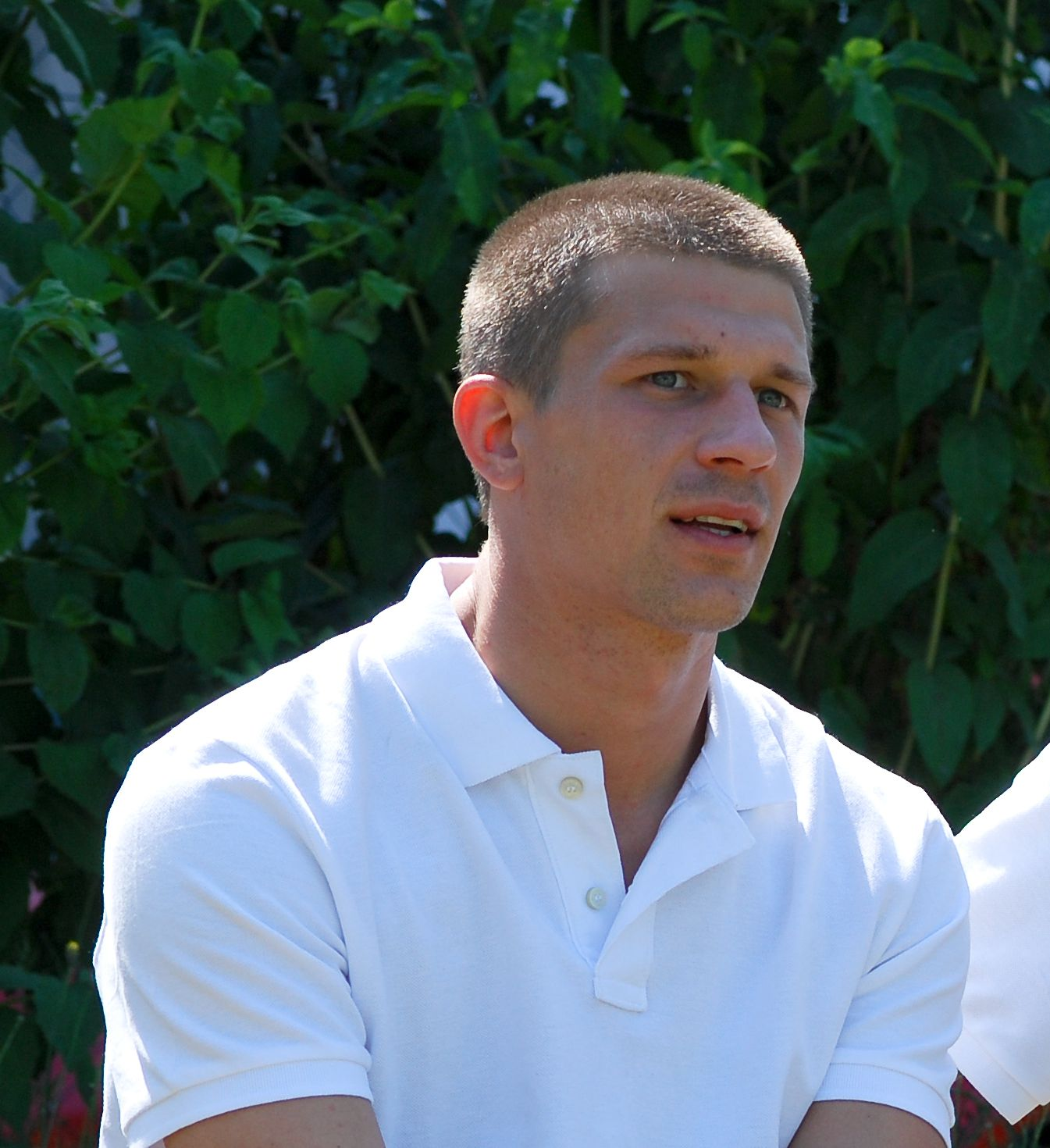
- Born: Dennis Walger; 29 February 1984 (age 42) Offenbach, Germany
- Height: 1.78 m (5 ft 10 in)
- Weight: 75 kg (11 st 11 lb)

Rugby union career
- Position: Fullback
Amateur team(s)
Years	Team	Apps	(Points)
- RK Heusenstamm
- Correct as of 19 March 2010
International career
Years	Team	Apps	(Points)
2007	Germany	1	(0)
- Correct as of 19 March 2010
National sevens team
Years	Team		Comps
- Germany 7's

Dennis Walger (born 29 February 1984 in Offenbach am Main) is a German international rugby union player, playing for the RK Heusenstamm in the Rugby-Bundesliga and the German national rugby union team.

His sole international for Germany came on 29 September 2007 in a friendly against Switzerland. He is the brother of Markus Walger, also a German international.

Walger has also played for the Germany's 7's side in the past, like at the World Games 2005 in Duisburg, where Germany finished 8th.

== Honours ==
=== Club ===
- German sevens championship
  - Champions: 2006

== Stats ==
Dennis Walger's personal statistics in club and international rugby:

=== Club ===
Year	Club	Division	Games	Tries	Con	Pen	DG	Place
2008-09	RK Heusenstamm	Rugby-Bundesliga	11	3	0	0	0	7th
2009-10	RK Heusenstamm	Rugby-Bundesliga	12	1	0	0	0	8th
2010-11	RK Heusenstamm	Rugby-Bundesliga	4	2	0	0	0	9th
2011-12	RK Heusenstamm	Rugby-Bundesliga	0	0	0	0	0	10th

- As of 29 April 2012

=== National team ===
Year	Team	Competition	Games	Points
2007	Germany	Friendly	1	0

- As of 19 March 2010
