= Markus Walger =

Germany international rugby union player

- Born: Markus Walger; 24 August 1979 (age 47) Offenbach, Germany
- Height: 1.79 m (5 ft 10 in)
- Weight: 92 kg (14 st 7 lb)
- Occupation: Electrician

Rugby union career
- Position: Wing
Amateur team(s)
Years	Team	Apps	(Points)
- RK Heusenstamm
- Correct as of 6 March 2010
International career
Years	Team	Apps	(Points)
2008	Germany	17	
- Correct as of 6 March 2010
National sevens team
Years	Team		Comps
- Germany 7's

Markus Walger (born 24 August 1979) is a German international rugby union player, playing for the RK Heusenstamm in the Rugby-Bundesliga and the German national rugby union team.

Walger's last game for Germany, his 17th international, was against Spain on 15 November 2008. He is the brother of Dennis Walger, also a German international.

Walger was born in Offenbach am Main, and has played rugby since he was six years old.

Walger has also played for the Germany's 7's side in the past, like at the 2008 Hannover Sevens, the 2006 London Sevens and the World Games 2005 in Duisburg, where Germany finished 8th.

== Honours ==
=== Club ===
- German sevens championship
  - Champions: 2006

=== National team ===
- European Nations Cup - Division 2
  - Champions: 2008

== Stats ==
Markus Walger's personal statistics in club and international rugby:

=== Club ===
Year	Club	Division	Games	Tries	Con	Pen	DG	Place
2008-09	RK Heusenstamm	Rugby-Bundesliga	16	5	0	0	0	7th
2009-10	RK Heusenstamm	Rugby-Bundesliga	18	7	0	0	0	8th
2010-11	RK Heusenstamm	Rugby-Bundesliga	15	0	0	0	0	9th
2011-12	RK Heusenstamm	Rugby-Bundesliga	17	2	0	0	0	10th

- As of 29 April 2012

=== National team ===
==== European Nations Cup ====
Year	Team	Competition	Games	Points	Place
2006-2008	Germany	European Nations Cup Second Division	3	0	Champions
2008-2010	Germany	European Nations Cup First Division	1	0	6th — Relegated

==== Friendlies & other competitions ====
Year	Team	Competition	Games	Points
2007	Germany	Friendly	1	15

- As of 6 March 2010
