= FC St. Pauli Rugby =

German rugby union club & section of FC St. Pauli

(Germany) FC St. Pauli Rugby
- Full name: FC St. Pauli Rugby
- Union: German Rugby Federation
- Founded: 1910; 116 years ago (club); 1933; 93 years ago (rugby department)
- Location: Hamburg, Germany
- Chairman: Dr. Nils Zurawski
- Coach: Paul McGuigan
- Captain: Julian Maury
- League: Rugby-Bundesliga
- 2015–16: Rugby-Bundesliga North/East, 5th
Team kit

Official website
- www.fcstpaulirugby.de

The FC St. Pauli Rugby is the rugby union section of German sports club FC St. Pauli, based in Hamburg. The squad currently plays in the Rugby-Bundesliga, the highest level of the German rugby league system. Other sports practised at St. Pauli are American football, association football, and baseball.

While the men's team has had limited success over the years, St. Pauli's women are one of the most successful teams in Germany, having reached every championship final from 1995 to 2008 and winning eight out of the fourteen.

== History ==
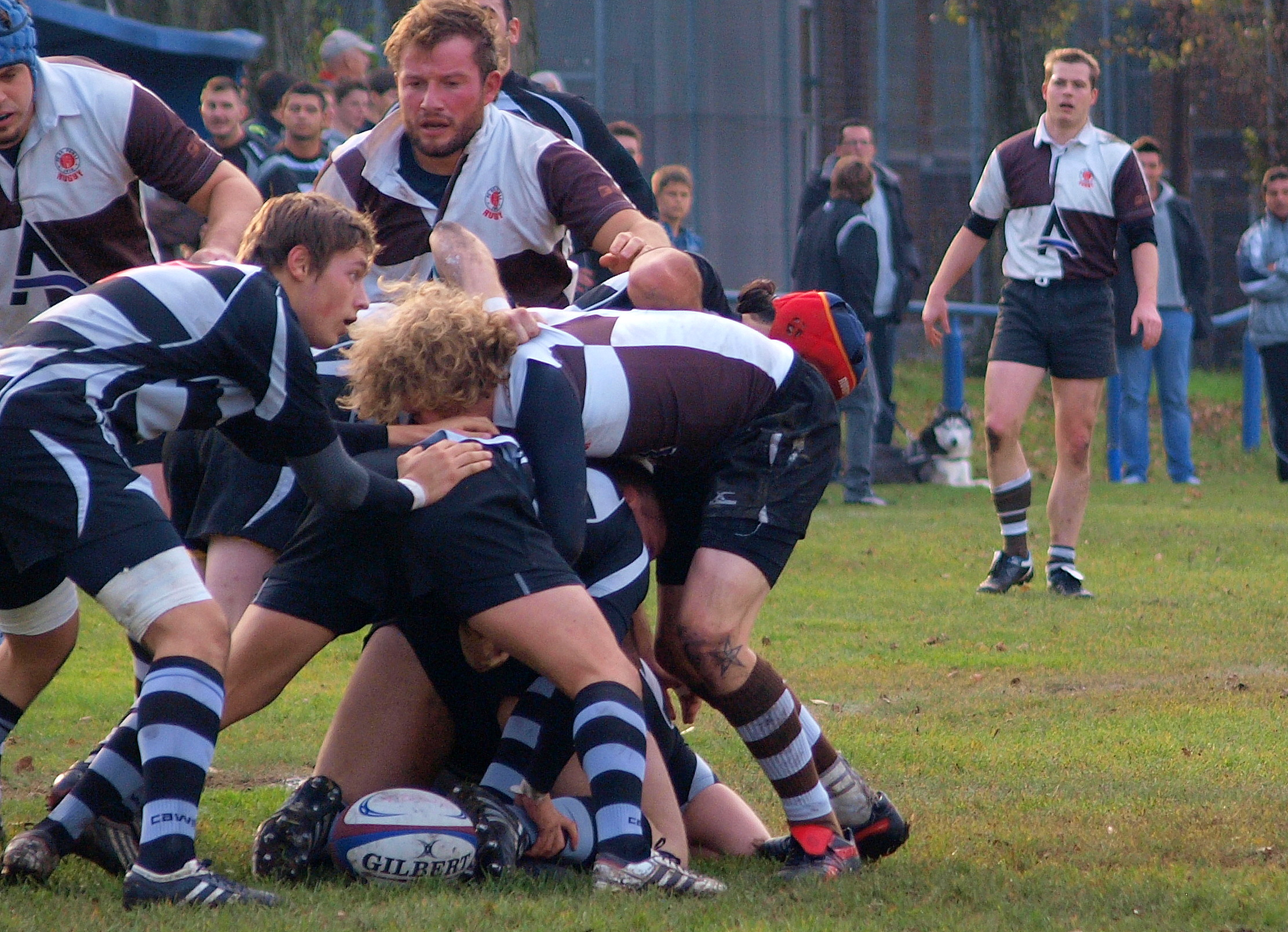
Scene during a game FC St. Pauli (brown/white) vs Victoria Linden (black/white)

St Pauli's rugby department was formed in 1933 when two Jewish brothers, Otto and Paul Lang from Heidelberg, were forced to leave their club, the SV St. Georg, and joined FC St Pauli. In April 1933, the FC St Pauli board called for the formation of a rugby team and the club's 6th football XI decided to switch codes and play rugby instead.

It took the team over a year to achieve their first draw but it soon improved and won its first Nordmark championship, against bitter rival Hamburger SV Rugby. It repeated this success in 1938 and 1939.

The club resumed playing rugby in 1947, at first against teams of the British occupation force in Germany, but soon in the Nordmark championship again, which it won uninterruptedly from 1948 to 1958.

In the early 1960s, St Pauli faced strong opposition from local rival SV Polizei Hamburg and the Nordmark championship became a Hamburg-only competition after the last of the teams from Kiel was dissolved.

The club's men's team reached its only German championship final in 1964, when it lost 0-11 to DSV 78 Hannover after having beaten favourites SC Neuenheim in Heidelberg in the semi-finals.

FC St Pauli Rugby was one of the founding members of the new Rugby-Bundesliga in 1971 and, in the first three seasons, was a competitive side there. An ageing team and a slacking in the youth development led to the club's relegation in 1975, temporarily even setting a negative Bundesliga record with a 3-102 defeat against TSV Victoria Linden.

Upon return to the Hamburg championship, the club faced strong competition from Hamburger SV, Hamburger RC and Hamburg Exiles RFC, but was able to win the local championship another eight times between 1976 and 1988. In this era, the club suffered from financial difficulties, brought upon by the professional football team.

The year 1988 brought two important changes to the club. The men's team finally returned to the Rugby-Bundesliga, and a women's team was formed.

The team managed to survive for only two seasons in the Bundesliga and earned another record defeat against Victoria Linden, this time a 0-113.

Instead, the club's women's team begun to shine from 1995 onwards, earning its first German championship that year.

While the women's team continued its success throughout the years, winning eight German championships until 2008, the men's side was able to establish itself on the second level of German rugby, the 2nd Rugby-Bundesliga, where it plays as a mid-table side.

In the season 2011/12 the 1st men's team won the title of the 2nd Rugby-Bundesliga North/East. On the first of May 2012 they competed in a final against the winner of the second tier league in the south Frankfurt 1880 II. The game was played in Hamburg and St. Pauli lost 22:32. The title in the north earned St. Pauli the right for a promotion to the highest level of rugby played in Germany the Rugby-Bundesliga. St. Pauli finished second in their group in the 2012-13 season and qualified for the north/east division of the championship round, where it came fourth. The club was knocked out in the first round of the play-offs after losing 30–13 to SC 1880 Frankfurt.

In 2013–14 the team qualified for the championship round and the play-offs once more, losing to SC Neuenheim in the first round. In the 2014–15 season the club finished sixth in the north-east championship group but was knocked out of the first round of the play-offs after a 78–0 loss to RG Heidelberg.

== Club honours ==
=== Men ===
- German rugby union championship
  - Runners up: 1964
- German rugby union junior cup
  - Champions: 1992, 2002
  - Runners up: 1993, 1994
- Nordmark/Hamburg championship
  - Champions: 1937, 1938, 1939, 1948–58, 1961, 1963, 1964, 1967–71
- 2nd Rugby-Bundesliga
  - Division champions: 2002, 2012
  - Division runners up: 2005, 2011

=== Women ===
- German rugby union championship
  - Champions: 1995, 2000, 2001, 2003, 2005, 2006, 2007, 2008
  - Runners up: 1996, 1997, 1998, 1999, 2002, 2004, 2012
- German sevens championship
  - Champions: 2000, 2001, 2002
  - Runners up: 2007

== Recent seasons ==
Recent seasons of the club:

=== Men ===
Year	Division	Position
1997-98	2nd Rugby-Bundesliga North/East (II)	8th — Relegated
1998-99	Rugby-Regionalliga (III)	
1998-99	2nd Rugby-Bundesliga North/East relegation round	1st — Promoted
1999-2000	2nd Rugby-Bundesliga North/East (II)	1st
1999-2000	Bundesliga qualification round	6th
2000-01	2nd Rugby-Bundesliga North/East	5th
2000-01	2nd Rugby-Bundesliga North/East relegation round	1st
2001-02	2nd Rugby-Bundesliga North/East	6th
2002-03	2nd Rugby-Bundesliga North/East	3rd
2003-04	2nd Rugby-Bundesliga North/East	5th
2004-05	2nd Rugby-Bundesliga North/East	2nd
2005-06	2nd Rugby-Bundesliga North/East	3rd
2006–07	2nd Rugby-Bundesliga North/East	5th
2007–08	2nd Rugby-Bundesliga North/East	3rd
2008–09	2nd Rugby-Bundesliga North/East	4th
2009–10	2nd Rugby-Bundesliga North/East	4th
2010–11	2nd Rugby-Bundesliga North/East	2nd
2011–12	2nd Rugby-Bundesliga North/East	1st — Promoted
2012–13	Rugby-Bundesliga qualification round – North	2nd
2012–13	Rugby-Bundesliga championship round – North-East	4th — Round of sixteen
2013–14	Rugby-Bundesliga qualification round – North	2nd
2013–14	Rugby-Bundesliga championship round – North-East	5th — First round
2014–15	Rugby-Bundesliga qualification round – North	3rd
2014–15	Rugby-Bundesliga championship round – North-East	6th – first round
2015–16	Rugby-Bundesliga North-East	5th

- Until 2001, when the single-division Bundesliga was established, the season was divided in autumn and spring, a Vorrunde and Endrunde, whereby the top teams of the Rugby-Bundesliga would play out the championship while the bottom teams together with the autumn 2nd Bundesliga champion would play for Bundesliga qualification. The remainder of the 2nd Bundesliga teams would play a spring round to determine the relegated clubs. Where two placing's are shown, the first is autumn, the second spring. In 2012 the Bundesliga was expanded from ten to 24 teams and the 2nd Bundesliga from 20 to 24 with the leagues divided into four regional divisions.

=== Women ===
Year	Division	Position
2000-01	Women's Rugby Bundesliga (I)	1st — Champions
2001-02	Women's Rugby Bundesliga	1st — Runners up
2002-03	Women's Rugby Bundesliga	1st — Champions
2003-04	Women's Rugby Bundesliga	2nd — Runners up
2004-05	Women's Rugby Bundesliga	1st — Champions
2005-06	Women's Rugby Bundesliga	1st — Champions
2006–07	Women's Rugby Bundesliga	1st — champions
2007–08	Women's Rugby Bundesliga	1st — Champions
2008–09	Women's Rugby Bundesliga	3rd
2009–10	Women's Rugby Bundesliga	4th
2010–11	Women's Rugby Bundesliga	3rd
2011-12	Women's Rugby Bundesliga	1st — Runners up
2012–13	Women's Rugby Bundesliga	1st
2013–14	Women's Rugby Bundesliga	4th
2014–15	Women's Rugby Bundesliga	3rd
2015–16	Women's Rugby Bundesliga	4th

== Rugby internationals ==
In Germany's 2006–08 European Nations Cup campaign, FC St Pauli's captain Friedrich Michau was called up for the national team.

Horst Wohler, with 30 internationals, is the club's most capped player.
