= East German rugby union championship =

- Sport: Rugby union
- Founded: 1952
- Folded: 1990
- Country: East Germany
- Most titles: BSG Stahl Hennigsdorf (27)

The East German rugby union championship was a rugby union competition in the German Democratic Republic, commonly referred to as East Germany. The competition was first held in 1952 and had its last edition in 1990, being terminated by the events of the German reunion.

== Competition ==
The competition was carried out via the DDR Rugby-Oberliga, which consisted of, for a large part of its live time, eight clubs. Below it sat the 2. Liga, the second division.

The competition was carried out in a home-and-away season, a final was not played.

== Participating clubs ==
The number of rugby clubs in East Germany was never large and the Rugby-Oberliga had, at times, even first and reserve teams playing in it. The following clubs played in the league and championship and some stage:

- BSG Stahl Hennigsdorf, now SV Stahl Hennigsdorf Rugby
- SC DHfK Leipzig, rugby department now part of RC Leipzig
- ASK Vorwärts Berlin, rugby department defunct
- BSG Lokomotive Wahren Leipzig, rugby department now part of RC Leipzig
- BSG Stahl Leegebruch, club defunct
- BSG Stahl Brandenburg, rugby department now SG Stahl Brandenburg Rugby
- BSG Post Berlin, rugby department now RK 03 Berlin
- Dynamo Potsdam, became Polizei SV Potsdam, club defunct
- Empor Velten, now Veltener RC
- Ingenieurschule Hennigsdorf, club defunct
- BSG Lok Berlin
- BSG Gastronom Leipzig, rugby department now part of RC Leipzig
- BSG Lok Falkensee
- Dynamo Dresden, rugby department defunct

== Winners ==
The East German championship was held from 1952 to 1990, with the Stahl Hennigsdorf Rugby as the most successful team, winning 27 championships:.

Season	Winner	Runner-up
1952	BSG Stahl Hennigsdorf	
1953	BSG Stahl Hennigsdorf	
1954	DHfK Leipzig	
1955	DHfK Leipzig	
1956	SC Vorwärts Berlin	
1957	DHfK Leipzig	
1958	DHfK Leipzig	
1959	not held	
1960	BSG Stahl Hennigsdorf	
1961	BSG Stahl Hennigsdorf	
1962	BSG Stahl Hennigsdorf	
1963	DHfK Leipzig	
1964	BSG Lokomotive Wahren Leipzig	
1965	BSG Stahl Hennigsdorf	
1966	BSG Stahl Hennigsdorf	
1967	BSG Stahl Hennigsdorf	
1968	BSG Stahl Hennigsdorf	
1969	BSG Stahl Hennigsdorf	
1970	BSG Stahl Hennigsdorf	
1971	BSG Stahl Hennigsdorf	
1972	BSG Stahl Leegebruch	
1973	BSG Stahl Hennigsdorf	
1974	BSG Stahl Hennigsdorf	
1975	BSG Stahl Hennigsdorf	
1976	BSG Stahl Hennigsdorf	
1977	BSG Stahl Hennigsdorf	
1978	BSG Lokomotive Wahren Leipzig	BSG Stahl Hennigsdorf
1979	BSG Lokomotive Wahren Leipzig	BSG Stahl Hennigsdorf
1980	BSG Lokomotive Wahren Leipzig	BSG Stahl Hennigsdorf
1981	BSG Stahl Hennigsdorf	
1982	BSG Stahl Hennigsdorf	
1983	BSG Stahl Hennigsdorf	
1984	BSG Stahl Hennigsdorf	
1985	BSG Stahl Hennigsdorf	
1986	BSG Stahl Hennigsdorf	
1987	BSG Stahl Hennigsdorf	
1988	BSG Stahl Hennigsdorf	BSG Stahl Brandenburg
1989	BSG Stahl Hennigsdorf	BSG Post Berlin
1990	BSG Stahl Hennigsdorf	BSG Post Berlin

=== Winners by number of titles ===
Club	Championships
BSG Stahl Hennigsdorf	27
DHfK Leipzig	5
BSG Lokomotive Wahren Leipzig	4
BSG Stahl Leegebruch	1
SC Vorwärts Berlin	1
