= RC Leipzig =

German rugby union club, based in Leipzig

(Germany) RC Leipzig
- Full name: Rugby Club Leipzig e.V.
- Union: German Rugby Federation
- Founded: 2003
- Location: Leipzig, Germany
- Chairman: Karsten Heine
- Coach: Falk Müller
- League: Rugby-Bundesliga (I)
- 2018–19: Rugby-Bundesliga North/East, 4th, Cup champions

Official website
- www.leipzig-rugby.de

The RC Leipzig is a German rugby union club from Leipzig, currently playing in the Rugby-Bundesliga, the top tier of German rugby.

The club, formed in 2004, traces its history back to the early 1950s, when a number of successful rugby clubs were formed in Leipzig in what was then East Germany. Between them, these predecessor clubs have won nine East German rugby union championships.

== History ==
Rugby in Leipzig dates back to the 1950s, when a number of rugby departments were founded in local sport clubs. BSG Lok Leipzig-Wahren, SC DHfK Leipzig, BSG Gastronom Leipzig and the army club ASK Leipzig were four such teams formed over time, reaching a peak in numbers in the 1960s.

DHfK was the most successful of the teams, winning five championships between 1954 and 1963, followed by Lok with four. By the 1980s, only two rugby departments had survived in Leipzig, those of Lok and Gastronom. Lok had a successful spell in the late 1970s, when it managed to break the dominance of BSG Stahl Hennigsdorf and won three East German championships in a row.

With the German reunion, the two departments merged in the early 1990s and became part of the HSG DHfK Leipzig. In September 1994, the rugby players then joined the re-formed TSV 1893 Leipzig-Wahren, where they formed their own department.

The rugby players stayed at TSV for the next ten years, until September 2004, when the RC Leipzig was founded in the suburb of Stahmeln. Some players did however stay for a further year playing touch rugby, afterwards making a successful move to the club SG LVB in Leipzig-Connewitz.

Rugby in the city continues to develop with both touch and fifteen-a-side teams reaching new levels of popularity. In recent seasons RC Leipzig have rebuilt their squad around the Under-18 side which won the national championship in 2007. Their current squad contains several former age-grade national team members as well as several players with high-level rugby experience in foreign countries. The club has solidified its position in the Regionalliga East and has outlined plans to attain 2.Bundesliga status within five years. The Touch Rugby team at SG LVB continues to play social touch all year round on a casual basis and during the summer months takes part in tournaments around Germany.

A league reform in 2012 allowed the club promotion to the Bundesliga as the league was expanded from ten to 24 teams, thereby jumping straight from the third to the first division. RCL finished fifth in their group in the 2012–13 season and failed to qualify for the championship round, instead entering the second tier DRV-Pokal, where it came second in the north/east division. The club advanced to the quarter-finals of the play-offs where it was knocked out by StuSta München.

The club qualified for the DRV-Pokal in 2013–14 and received a bye for the first round of the play-offs after coming first in the north-east division of the competition and originally advanced to the final against Heidelberger TV. However LeIpzig's semi final win against RC Rottweil was later converted into a defeat after it was discovered that Leipzig had used an ineligible player, with Rottweil advancing to the final instead.

In the 2014–15 season the club finished first in the north-east DRV-Pokal group and was knocked out by RC Rottweil in the semi-finals of the play-offs after a bye in the first round and a quarter final victory over RC Luxembourg.

== Club honours ==
- East German rugby union championship
  - Champions:
    - DHfK Leipzig: (5) 1954, 1955, 1957, 1958, 1963
    - BSG Lokomotive Wahren Leipzig: (4) 1964, 1978–80

== Recent seasons ==
Recent seasons of the club:

=== TSV Leipzig-Wahren ===
Year	Division	Position
2003–04	Rugby-Regionalliga East (South) (III)	3rd
2003–04	Placings round 2	3rd – Relegated

=== RC Leipzig ===
Year	Division	Position
2004–05	Rugby-Regionalliga East B (IV)	3rd
2004–05	Placings round 2	1st – Promoted
2005–06	Rugby-Regionalliga East A (III)	8th
2005–06	Placings round 2	2nd – Relegated
2006–07	Rugby-Regionalliga East B (IV)	3rd
2006–07	Placings round 1	2nd – Promoted
2007–08	Rugby-Regionalliga East A (III)	7th
2008–09	Rugby-Regionalliga East A	6th
2009–10	Rugby-Regionalliga East	10th – Relegated
2009–10	Rugby-Regionalliga East B (IV)	4th
2010–11	Rugby-Regionalliga East	10th
2011–12	Rugby-Regionalliga East	2nd
2012–13	Rugby-Bundesliga qualification round – East	5th
2012–13	DRV-Pokal – North-East	2nd – Quarter finals
2013–14	Rugby-Bundesliga qualification round – East	4th
2013–14	DRV-Pokal – North-East	1st – Semi finals
2014–15	Rugby-Bundesliga qualification round – East	6th
2014–15	DRV-Pokal – North-East	1st – Semi finals
2015–16	Rugby-Bundesliga North-East	6th

- Until 2001, when the single-division Bundesliga was established, the season was divided in autumn and spring, a Vorrunde and Endrunde, whereby the top teams of the Rugby-Bundesliga would play out the championship while the bottom teams together with the autumn 2nd Bundesliga champion would play for Bundesliga qualification. The remainder of the 2nd Bundesliga teams would play a spring round to determine the relegated clubs. Where two placing's are shown, the first is autumn, the second spring. In 2012 the Bundesliga was expanded from ten to 24 teams and the 2nd Bundesliga from 20 to 24 with the leagues divided into four regional divisions.
- Since 2004, the Regionalliga East has been divided into an A and a B group, with the A group being the third tier of German rugby and B the fourth. Until 2007, the two leagues would play a separate autumn round, followed by a promotion/relegation round in spring, where teams would play according to their autumn placing. Where two placings are shown, the first is autumn, the second spring.
