= Stahl Hennigsdorf Rugby =

German rugby union club, based in Hennigsdorf

(Germany) Stahl Hennigsdorf Rugby
- Full name: Sport Verein Stahl Hennigsdorf Rugby e.V. 1948
- Union: German Rugby Federation
- Founded: 1948; 78 years ago
- Location: Hennigsdorf, Germany
- Ground: Sportplatz Berliner Straße
- Chairman: Olaf Laetsch
- Coach: Thomas Bartsch
- League: Rugby-Regionalliga East
- 2014–15: 3rd

Official website
- www.rugby-hennigsdorf.de

The Stahl Hennigsdorf Rugby is a German rugby union club from Hennigsdorf, currently playing in the tier-four Regionalliga East B. The team is part of a larger club, the Stahl Hennigsdorf, which also offers other sports like volleyball, table tennis and boxing.

The club, located in former East Germany, was the most successful rugby team in the country, having won 27 national championships from 1952 to 1990, when the last championship was held.

The term Stahl is the German word for steel and refers to the club's connection to the local steelworks.

The club is located in the Oberhavel district, north west of Berlin. The district is home to two more rugby union clubs, RU Hohen Neuendorf and Veltener RC.

== History ==
=== East Germany ===
The club was formed in 1948 when Erwin Thiesies, a former German rugby international for Berliner SV, brought the game to Hennigsdorf. He tried to find a home for the sport in the BSG Motor Hennigsdorf but found the club uninterested. He was more successful when contacting BSG Stahl Hennigsdorf and a rugby department was formed.

After originally playing sides from Berlin, the club soon established contacts to teams in Hanover. Erwin Thiesies, by being employed through the local steel works, became the full-time coach of Stahl and was able to travel abroad to watch games and improve his knowledge of the game.

Stahl became the first East German rugby union champion in 1952 and defended this title the following year but then had to wait a number of years for another title. In this era, the club provided the core of the East German team, together with DHfK Leipzig and ASK Vorwärts Berlin. Stahl, until the German reunion, continued to provide the core of the national team.

Stahl's most dominating time came from 1965 to 1977, when the club won the national title in every season but one, 1972, when Stahl Leegebruch took out the championship.

In 1977, Erwin Thiesies finally retired as the club's coach and was replaced by Wolfgang Götsch, a 20-time GDR international with 700 games for Stahl to his name. Under him, the team was rejuvenated and three runners-up finishes from 1978 to 1980 were achieved.

From 1981, Stahl returned to its old dominance, winning ten championships in a row, including the last one ever held in East Germany, in 1990. It bowed out of East German rugby history by winning the cup competition as well that year.

=== Germany ===
With the German reunion, the changes in society and the freedom of travel, the club experienced a substantial loss of players. In 1991, the club took part in the Rugby-Bundesliga qualification round, where, after a weak start, it succeeded by winning its last eight games. Additionally, the club's name was altered from BSG Stahl to SV Stahl.

It lasted for only one season at this level, being relegated to the 2nd Rugby-Bundesliga in 1992. A year later, on 18 February 1993, the club's founding father, Erwin Thiesies, died, aged 84.

In 1998, after over 20 years as coach of Stahl, Wolfgang Götsch resigned from his position due to illness, to be replaced by his assistant Udo Schimroszik. Two years later, in 2000, the club returned to the Rugby-Bundesliga. But again the club lasts for only one season, returning to the 2nd Bundesliga in 2001.

Stahl remained in this league as a top of the table side in the coming years, despite suffering from a lack of players, especially in 2005-06. The club reached a low point after this season, for the first time in its history it was unable to field a side and did not take part in the German league system in 2006-07. The following season, it fielded a combined team, together with the reserve side of local rival RU Hohen Neuendorf, in the lowest division, the tier-four Regionalliga East B. This partnership however lasted for only one season.

The club fielded its own, independent team in the fourth division in 2008-09 and continues to do so in 2009-10. It won the league title in 2009 and played in the Regionalliga East in autumn 2009, where it finished sixth and had to play in the B division in spring 2010.

== Club honours ==
- East German rugby union championship
  - Champions: (27) 1952, 1953, 1960–62, 1965–71, 1973–77, 1981–90
  - Runners up: 1978-80

== Recent seasons ==
Recent seasons of the club:

Year	Division	Position
1998-99	2nd Rugby-Bundesliga North/East (II)	
1998-99	Bundesliga qualification round	11th
1999-2000	2nd Rugby-Bundesliga North/East	
1999-2000	Bundesliga qualification round	8th
2000-01	Rugby-Bundesliga North/East (I)	5th
2000-01	Bundesliga qualification round	10th
2001-02	2nd Rugby-Bundesliga North/East (II)	3rd
2002-03	2nd Rugby-Bundesliga North/East	4th
2003-04	2nd Rugby-Bundesliga North/East	3rd
2004-05	2nd Rugby-Bundesliga North/East	3rd
2005-06	2nd Rugby-Bundesliga North/East	6th
2006–07	no team fielded	
2007–08	Regionalliga East B (IV)	2nd
2008–09	Regionalliga East B	1st
2009–10	Rugby-Regionalliga East (III)	6th
2009–10	Rugby-Regionalliga East B (IV)	1st
2010–11	Rugby-Regionalliga East	6th
2011–12	Rugby-Regionalliga East	11th
2012–13	Rugby-Regionalliga East	4th
2013–14	Rugby-Regionalliga East	5th
2014-15	Rugby-Regionalliga East	3rd
2015-16	Rugby-Regionalliga East	

- Until 2001, when the single-division Bundesliga was established, the season was divided in autumn and spring, a Vorrunde and Endrunde, whereby the top teams of the Rugby-Bundesliga would play out the championship while the bottom teams together with the autumn 2nd Bundesliga champion would play for Bundesliga qualification. The remainder of the 2nd Bundesliga teams would play a spring round to determine the relegated clubs. Where two placing's are shown, the first is autumn, the second spring.
