= Berliner SV 1892 Rugby =

German rugby union club

(Germany) Berliner SV 92 Rugby
- Full name: Berliner Sport-Verein 1892 e.V.
- Union: German Rugby Federation
- Founded: 1892; 134 years ago (club); 1936; 90 years ago (rugby department)
- Location: Forckenbeckstraße 20, 14199 Berlin, Germany
- Ground: Forcke
- Chairman: Matthias Scheuerlein; Frank Adam; Tina Urbach
- Coach: Danny Stephens
- League: 1. Bundesliga

Official website
- www.bsv92rugby.de

The Berliner SV 92 Rugby is a German rugby union club from Berlin, currently competing in the 1st Bundesliga (highest tier of German rugby). Known as “the international rugby club of Berlin” due to the diversity of nationalities in its 1st and 2nd men’s teams, it is part of a larger club, the Berliner SV 92, which also offers other sports like association football, baseball and basketball.

== Club ==
=== Youth Department ===
- under 6
- under 8
- under 10
- under 12
- under 14
- under 16

=== Women ===
- under 18
- Sevens

=== Men ===
- under 18
- Sevens
- Bundesliga
- Regionalliga

=== Legends ===
- Touch Rugby

=== Old Boys ===
- over 40
- over 50
- over 60

== History ==
Rugby union within the BSV 92 club begun in 1936, the year of the Olympic games in Berlin and the tournament there. The rugby department of Tennis Borussia Berlin, having existed for just eight years and won five Berlin championships in this time, collectively left the club to join BSV. The reasons for the move were the lack of support the rugby players got at Tennis Borussia and the fact that most players lived closer to BSV, which was based in Wilmersdorf, while Tennis Borussia had their playing fields in Niederschönhausen.

The club provided a conveniently located playing field at Lochowdamm for the rugby players, who were led by Paul König. The new department continued its dominance in the Berlin championship, winning it once more in 1937 and providing the core to Berlin selection teams out of the eight rugby clubs in the city in the years before the war.

With Erwin Thiesies and "Jonny" Richter, the club provided two players to the team that achieved Germany's last rugby victory over France, a 3-0 on 27 March 1938 in Frankfurt am Main.

The Second World War brought an end to Berlin as a centre of German rugby and BSV 92 lost many of its players during the war. It nevertheless resumed play, temporarily under the name of SG Wilmersdorf, after the war, winning two more Berlin championships, in 1947 and 1948 before being restored to its old name in 1949.

The club's greatest moment came in 1948, when it reached the first post-Second World War final of the German rugby union championship, which it lost 0-30 to TSV Victoria Linden. It also marked the last appearance of a club from Berlin in the German final for over 40 years, until 1989, when the Berliner RC lost to the same club.

Post-war rugby in Berlin mainly survived through the help of the allied occupation forces and the building of the Berlin Wall in 1961 made playing the sport in the city even harder, cutting off many players in the now separate parts of the city. BSV continued to be a successful side in Berlin until 1956, winning all but the 1955 championship during this time, but none after that.

In 1965, the club suffered another blow when it lost many of its players associated with the local police to a new rugby department at the police sport club. The club managed to compensate for this loss in the early 1970s by developing a successful youth department.

BSV 92 was not part of the new Rugby-Bundesliga, formed in 1971 and remained in local competitions instead. It reached national level however in 2007, when it earned promotion to the 2nd Rugby-Bundesliga North/East, the second tier of German rugby. At this level, the club lasted for two seasons before returning to the tier-three Rugby-Regionalliga in 2009, where it played for two seasons. After a second place and the league champions, RK 03 Berlin II, declining promotion, BSV moved back up instead.

A league reform in 2012 allowed the club promotion to the Bundesliga as the league was expanded from ten to 24 teams. BSV 92 finished fourth in their group in the 2012-13 season and qualified for the north/east division of the championship round, where it came eighth. The club opted to not play their first round play-off match, citing player shortage, and was thereby knocked out of the championship with the game awarded 50-0 to the opposition.

The club qualified for the championship round once more in 2013–14 but missed out on the play-offs after finishing seventh in its division. In the 2014–15 season the club finished fourth in the north-east DRV-Pokal group and was knocked out by RC Rottweil in the quarter-finals of the play-offs after a first round victory over TGS Hausen. For the 2015–16 season the club dropped back to the tier three Rugby-Regionalliga.

== Club honours ==
- German rugby union championship
  - Runners up: 1948
- Berlin rugby union championship
  - Champions: 1937, 1947–54, 1956

== Recent seasons ==
=== Men ===
Recent seasons of the club:

Year	Division	Position
1997-98	2nd Rugby-Bundesliga North/East (II)	7th
1998-99	2nd Rugby-Bundesliga North/East	6th
1998-99	2nd Rugby-Bundesliga North/East relegation round	4th — Relegated
1999-2000		
2000-01		
2001-02		
2002-03		
2003-04	Rugby-Regionalliga East (North) (III)	5th
2003-04	Placings round 1	3rd
2004-05	Rugby-Regionalliga East A	5th
2004-05	Placings round 1	1st
2005-06	Rugby-Regionalliga East A	4th
2005-06	Placings round 1	1st
2006-07	Rugby-Regionalliga East A	1st
2006-07	North/East championship round	3rd — Promoted
2007–08	2nd Rugby-Bundesliga North/East (II)	9th
2008–09	2nd Rugby-Bundesliga North/East	9th — Relegated
2009–10	Rugby-Regionalliga East (III)	2nd
2009–10	Rugby-Regionalliga East A	1st
2010–11	Rugby-Regionalliga East	2nd — Promoted
2011–12	2nd Rugby-Bundesliga North/East	7th — Promoted
2012–13	Rugby-Bundesliga qualification round – East	4th
2012–13	Rugby-Bundesliga championship round – North-East	8th — Round of sixteen
2013–14	Rugby-Bundesliga qualification round – East	3rd
2013–14	Rugby-Bundesliga championship round – North-East	7th
2014–15	Rugby-Bundesliga qualification round – East	5th
2014–15	DRV-Pokal – North-East	4th — Quarter finals
2015–16	Rugby-Regionalliga East (III)	4th
2016–17	Rugby-Regionalliga East (III)	2nd — Promoted
2017–18	Rugby 2nd Bundesliga East	1st — League Champion
2018–21	Rugby 2nd Bundesliga East	1st — League Champion

- Until 2001, when the single-division Bundesliga was established, the season was divided in autumn and spring, a Vorrunde and Endrunde, whereby the top teams of the Rugby-Bundesliga would play out the championship while the bottom teams together with the autumn 2nd Bundesliga champion would play for Bundesliga qualification. The remainder of the 2nd Bundesliga teams would play a spring round to determine the relegated clubs. Where two placing's are shown, the first is autumn, the second spring. In 2012 the Bundesliga was expanded from ten to 24 teams and the 2nd Bundesliga from 20 to 24 with the leagues divided into four regional divisions.
