= January 1901 =

Month in 1901

<<	January 1901					>>
Su	Mo	Tu	We	Th	Fr	Sa
		1	2	3	4	5
6	7	8	9	10	11	12
13	14	15	16	17	18	19
20	21	22	23	24	25	26
27	28	29	30	31

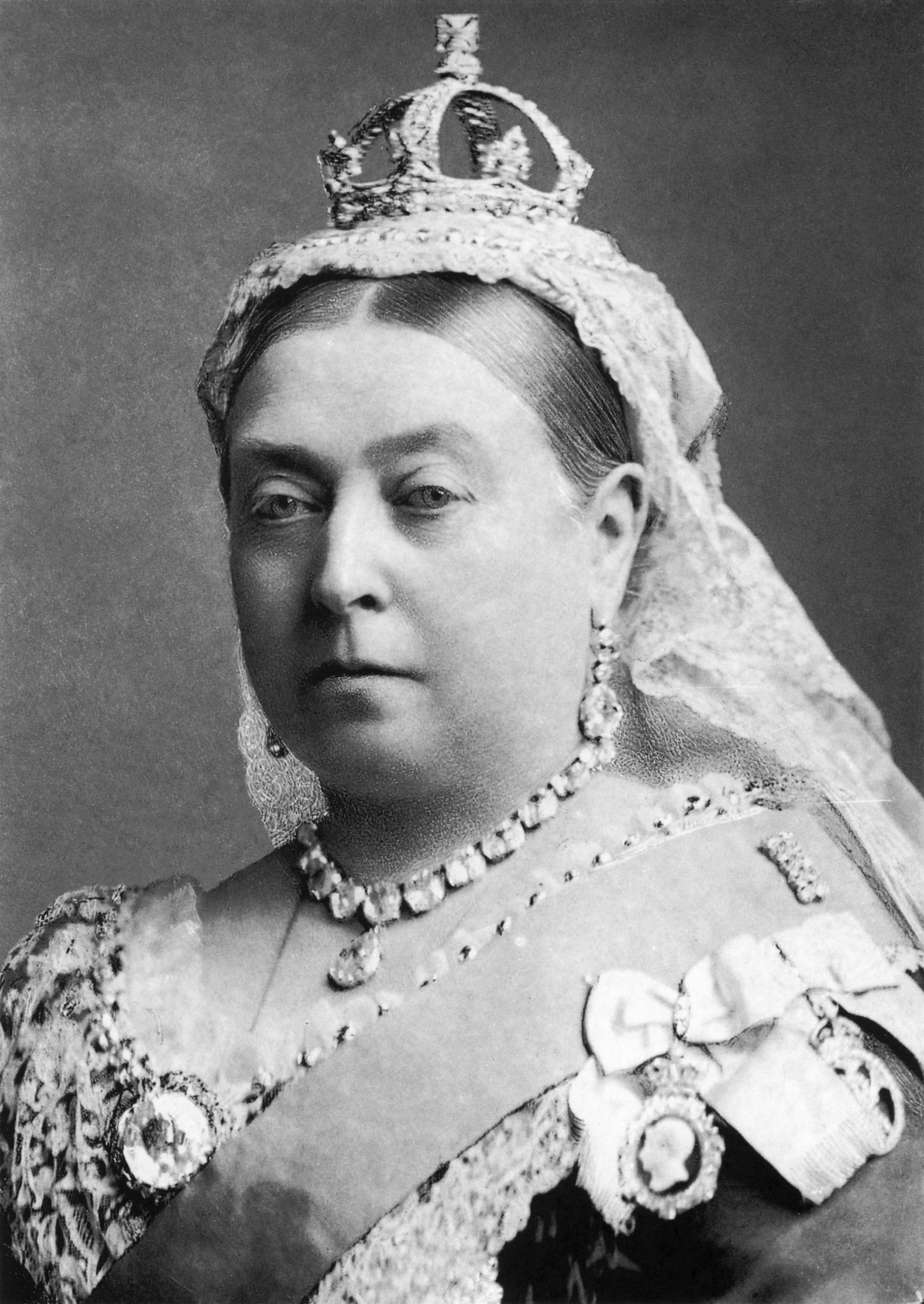
January 22, 1901: Queen Victoria, ruler of the British Empire, dies after a reign of 63 years

January 1, 1901: Commonwealth of Australia created by six colonies

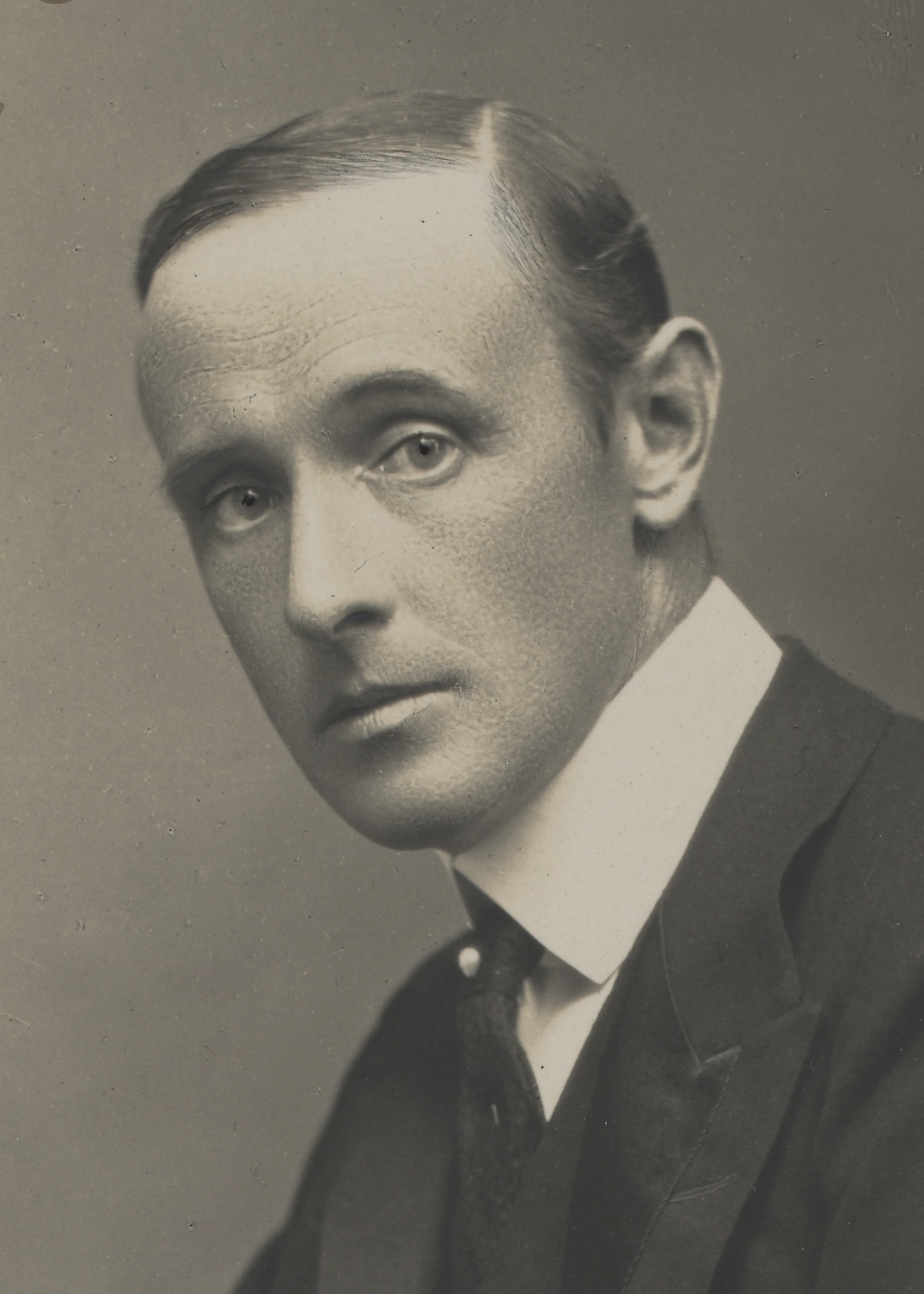
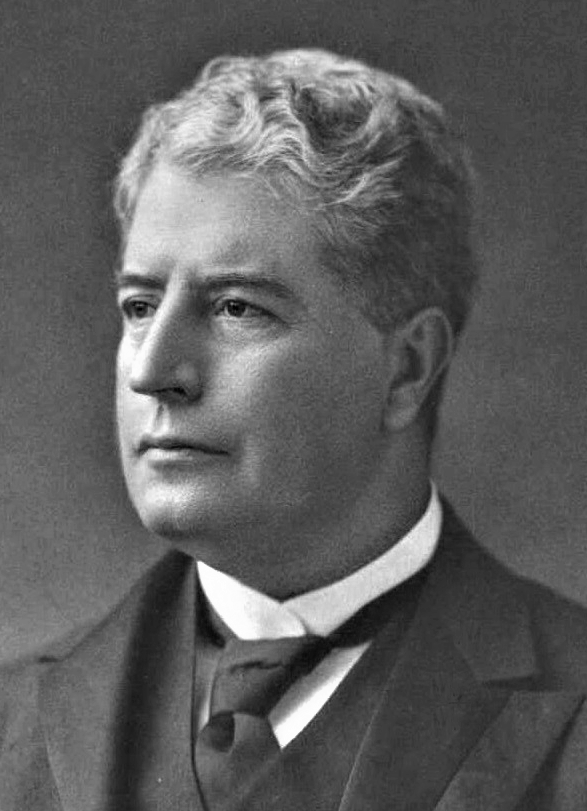
Australia's Governor-General Hopetoun and Prime Minister Barton

The following events occurred in January 1901:

== January 1, 1901 (Tuesday) ==
- The British colonies of New South Wales, Queensland, South Australia, Tasmania, Victoria and Western Australia federated as the Commonwealth of Australia. John Adrian Louis Hope, was appointed the first Governor-General of Australia; Edmund Barton became the first Prime Minister of Australia. The Barton ministry was made up of Protectionist Party members.
- The first day of the 20th century was celebrated. There was little celebration in Melbourne, Australia, because, as the local newspaper noted, "everybody who is anybody is in Sydney" (the first capital of the new Commonwealth).
- Nigeria became a British protectorate.
- Pentecostalism was founded, at a prayer meeting at Bethel Bible College in Topeka, Kansas.
- The centenary of the Act of Union was celebrated by British forces in Ireland.
- The New Year Honours List for the United Kingdom and British Empire was published in The Times. Those honoured included Queen Victoria's physician Professor Thomas Barlow, who became a baronet.
- Between 11:00 a.m. and 2:00 p.m., more than 5,300 members of the general public visited the White House for the annual New Year's Day tradition of being able to walk in and to shake hands with the President of the United States. In order to accommodate the remaining people in line in the final half hour, William McKinley shook hands "at the rate of sixty-five a minute by actual count". The President would be assassinated in September while shaking hands with the public.

== January 2, 1901 (Wednesday) ==
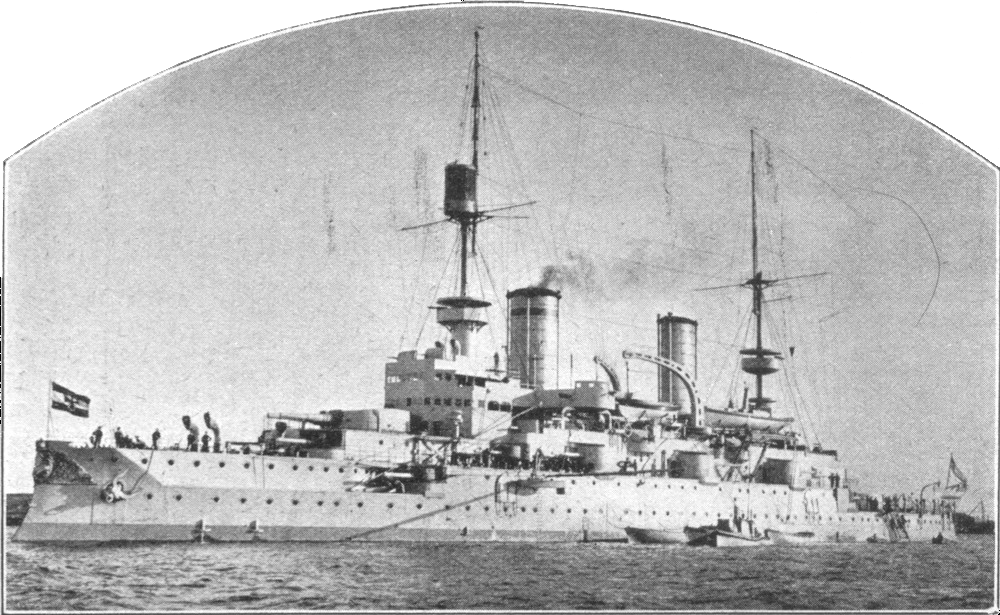
Kaiser Friedrich III in 1902

- While en route from Danzig to Kiel on 2 January 1901, the German battleship SMS Kaiser Friedrich III struck an underwater obstacle; the impact damaged four of the ship's watertight compartments, which then filled with water and caused the ship to list to port. The shock from the collision damaged the ship's boilers and started a fire in the coal bunkers. All of the ship's ammunition magazines, engine rooms, and storage compartments had to be flooded in order to prevent the fire from spreading. Two men were seriously injured while fighting the fire, and a third died of his injuries. After several hours the fire was extinguished and the engines were restarted. Throughout the incident, Prince Henry of Prussia steadfastly refused requests for him to leave the ship.
- In one of her final public appearances, Queen Victoria greeted Lord Roberts in his triumphant return from South Africa, meeting him at Osborne Castle on the Isle of Wight. Roberts was knighted as Order of the Garter and had the title of the First Earl Roberts conferred upon him.
- Ignatius L. Donnelly, 69, a former U.S. Congressman who wrote popular speculative books about long-destroyed civilizations supposed to have existed on Earth, died following a heart attack he suffered that evening at his father-in-law's home in Minneapolis. Donnelly's works included Atlantis: The Antediluvian World (1882) and Ragnarok: The Age of Fire and Gravel (1883). Using the pen name "Edmund Boisgilbert, M.D.", he wrote the 1890 science fiction novel Caesar's Column, about what the world of 1988 would look like. The book was subtitled "A Story of the Twentieth Century". Donnelly lived only to see the first day of the 20th century, his passing took place three minutes after midnight.

== January 3, 1901 (Thursday) ==
- The Victor Talking Machine Company introduced the first 10-inch phonographic record, a breakthrough permitting the playing of at least three minutes of recorded music. A longer version of the 1900 hit song "When Reuben Comes To Town", sung by S. H. Dudley, was the first offering.
- The St. Louis Southwestern Railway purchased the Stuttgart and Arkansas River Railroad.
- Born:
  - Ngo Dinh Diem, Vietnamese state leader, first President of South Vietnam; in Quảng Bình, French Indochina (assassinated 1963)
  - Alfred Tarski, Polish Jewish mathematician; in Warsaw (d. 1983)
  - Eric Voegelin, German philosopher; in Köln (d. 1985)

== January 4, 1901 (Friday) ==
- The United Kingdom announced its appointments of the new administrators for its colonies in southern Africa, with Sir Alfred Milner to be the British High Commissioner and the Governor of the Transvaal; Sir Walter Hely-Hutchinson as Governor of the Cape Colony; and Lieutenant Colonel Henry McCallum as Governor of Natal.
- Rootok Island, the smallest of the Krenitzin Islands, was set aside to house a lighthouse that would never be built.
- The United States Senate unanimously passed the Native Races Act, a resolution sponsored by Senator Henry Cabot Lodge of Massachusetts, declaring a policy that "aboriginal tribes and uncivilized people", both within the United States and its overseas possessions, should not be sold intoxicating beverages or opium.
- Born: C. L. R. James, Trinidadian writer and journalist; in Tunapuna (d. 1989)

== January 5, 1901 (Saturday) ==
- In response to the imminent organization of the American League as a second major baseball league, the National League announced in Louisville, Kentucky that it was going to revive an old minor league, the "American Association". American League President Ban Johnson told reporters in Cleveland, "You can poo-hoo that story right from the start. I don't know if the National League contemplates such a move, but if they do, it will never be born." On January 19, the league was formally launched and the cities for the new AA were announced to be Baltimore, Boston, Detroit, Indianapolis, Louisville, Milwaukee, Philadelphia, and Washington, D.C. The AA lineup happened to coincide with six of the eight American League teams, and Boston and Philadelphia had franchises in the NL and the AL. The sporting press reacted negatively to the anti-competitive proposal, and the National League would announce its abandonment of the idea on February 27.
- Syracuse University played its first college basketball game, a 21–8 loss to Rensselaer Polytechnic Institute. Although the Syracuse men's team would make four appearances in the Final Four in later years, it would not be until 102 years after its first game that it would win the national championship.
- Typhoid fever broke out in a Seattle jail, the first of two typhoid outbreaks in the United States during the year.
- The ten games of the intermediate round of the 30th FA Cup were played in England.
- The nineteenth rugby union Home Nations Championship commenced in the United Kingdom, with Wales defeating England 13–0 in Cardiff.
- Born: Tommy Cook, English athlete who was a star both in professional cricket and in association football; in Cuckfield, Sussex (committed suicide, 1950)

== January 6, 1901 (Sunday) ==
- At his apartment at 6 West 102nd Street in Manhattan, New York City, Theodore Dreiser began writing a new novel, Jennie Gerhardt, with the working title of The Transgressor. After four weeks, he would complete nine chapters, and 40 chapters by mid-April, but do repeated rewrites. In 1903, he would abandon it after suffering a nervous breakdown, but would resume writing in 1910 and publish the novel (which would later be adapted into a film) in 1911.
- Ottoman Sultan Abdul Hamid received the first telegram that opened a direct telegraph line between the Ottoman capital at Istanbul, and its largest Middle Eastern city at Dimeşk (Damascus), the capital of its Suriye province (now Syria). Prior to that time, the Palestinian city of Al-Salt was the furthest extent that the line would reach, hindering communications with the outer provinces in the Arabian Peninsula.
- Died:
  - Philip Armour, Sr., 68, American entrepreneur (b. 1832) He acquired control of most of the American meatpacking industry through his corporation Armour and Company; the brand name still survives.
  - Frederick Vosper, 31, Australian journalist, newspaper proprietor and politician, died of appendicitis. (b. 1869)

== January 7, 1901 (Monday) ==
- As the Second Boer War continued in South Africa, British positions along the Delagoa Bay Railway were attacked by Boer fighters, and both sides sustained heavy losses in the battle.
- Voters in Toronto approved municipal control of the city's natural gas plant.
- American prospector Alferd Packer was released from prison after serving 18 years in jail for manslaughter for cannibalism. Outgoing Colorado Governor Charles S. Thomas, in his last official act, paroled Packer because of "physical condition and advanced age" of almost 59 years. Packer would live another six years, dying on April 17, 1907.
- Died: James Dunwoody Bulloch, 77, diplomat for the Confederate States of America to the United Kingdom during the American Civil War. Bulloch retired to the United Kingdom after the defeat of the Confederacy, and was buried in Liverpool.

== January 8, 1901 (Tuesday) ==
- At his headquarters at San Isidro on the Philippine island of Luzon, U.S. Army Brigadier General Frederick Funston received a telegram revealing that the Filipino rebel president, Emilio Aguinaldo, was in a heavily guarded compound in the Sierra Madre mountains at Palanan. This bit of intelligence, obtained from American interrogation of a courier, Cecilio Segismundo, would lead General Funston to lead a mission to capture Aguinaldo, dead or alive.
- Irish Private John Barry, 27, surrounded by Boer troops on Monument Hill, South Africa, destroyed his Maxim gun to make it useless to the enemy, and was killed in doing so, an action for which he would be posthumously awarded the Victoria Cross.
- Paul Deschanel was re-elected as the president of the French Chamber of Deputies, defeating challenger Henri Brisson by a margin of 296–220.
- The United States House of Representatives voted, 165–102, to approve the Burleigh reapportionment bill, increasing the number of U.S. Representatives from 357 to 387. The United States Senate would approve the bill three days later.
- Twenty-eight residents of an orphanage in Rochester, New York, were killed in a fire. All but three of them were children.
- The first national bowling tournament in the United States opened in Chicago, in conjunction with the convention of the American Bowling Congress. In all, 42 men's teams and five women's teams (each with five players) participated.

== January 9, 1901 (Wednesday) ==
- Māori politician Hōne Heke Ngāpua was re-elected to the Northern Maori electorate seat in New Zealand, less than two months after having vacated the seat because of bankruptcy.
- Lord Kitchener reported that Christiaan de Wet had shot one of the "peace" envoys, and flogged two more, who had gone to his commando to ask the Burgher citizens of South Africa to halt fighting.
- Steel magnate Charles M. Schwab hosted the "Millionaire's Dinner" at the Hotel Schenley in Pittsburgh, bringing together an unprecedented assembly of wealthy individuals. In all, 89 millionaires gathered for a proposal to form combine forces to create U.S. Steel.
- Peter Ryu arrived in Honolulu, Hawaii, as a passenger on the Japanese ship Kongkong Maru, and was recorded as the first Korean immigrant to enter the United States.
- Born: Chic Young (Murat Bernard Young), American cartoonist; in Chicago. In 1930, Young would create the popular comic strip Blondie. He would continue to draw it until his death on March 14, 1973.

== January 10, 1901 (Thursday) ==
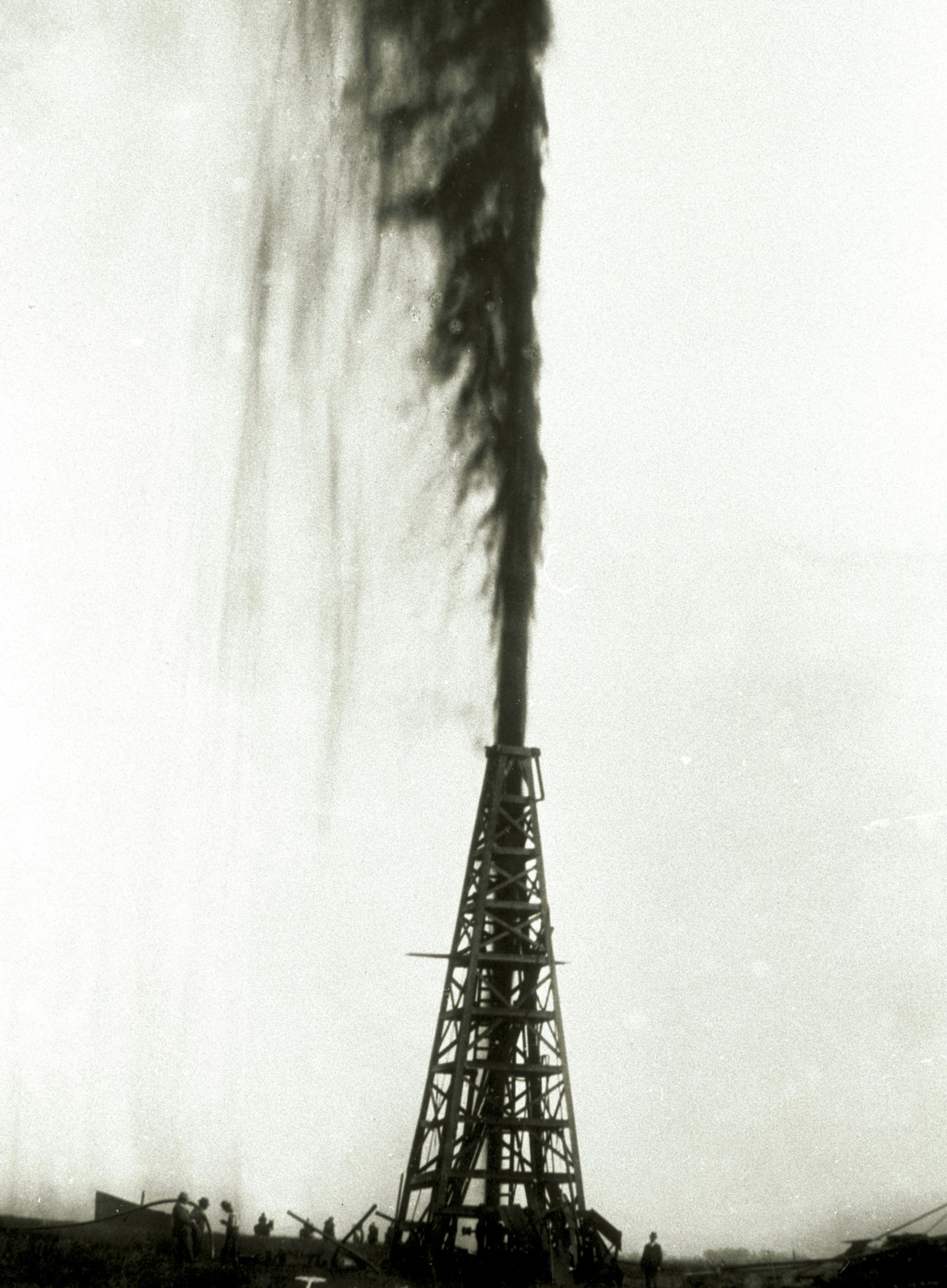
Spindletop

- In the first great Texas gusher, oil was discovered at Spindletop in Beaumont, Texas. The Spindletop gusher subsequently blew for nine days at a rate estimated at 100,000 barrels (16,000 m^{3}) of oil per day. Pattillo Higgins had been told by fellow geologists that it would be pointless to prospect for oil in the salt dome known as Spindletop Hill, so he eventually placed an advertisement to look for someone to take on the job of drilling. The one person who agreed to enter into a lease was Anthony Francis Lucas, a Croatian-American immigrant, who began drilling in October 1900. When the drill reached 1,139 feet (347 m), mud began to bubble and a geyser 100 feet (30 m) high erupted; by the end of the year, $235,000,000 would be invested in Texas oil fields.
- Joseph Chamberlain, the British Empire's Secretary of State for the Colonies, became the last Cabinet minister to report to Queen Victoria, giving an update on the Second Boer War and noted that "she showed not the slightest sign of failing intelligence". She told him that she regretted the length of the war but added "I am not anxious about the result.
- Born: Henning von Tresckow, German army officer, member of the unsuccessful assassination attempt against Adolf Hitler in 1944; in Magdeburg (committed suicide, 1944)

== January 11, 1901 (Friday) ==
- The American Bowling Congress crowned its first national champion men's bowler, as Frank Brill bowled games of 212, 237 and 199 pins for a total of 648, ahead of J. Koster, who totaled 621. The Greater New York team beat St. Louis, two games to one. A mother and daughter, both named Agnes Fuellgraff, had the best scores for the women.
- Less than two months before he was due to be inaugurated as Vice President of the United States, Theodore Roosevelt was on a hunting trip near Meeker, Colorado, when he found himself fighting "fist to jaw" with an enraged North American cougar, but managed to survive the ordeal without serious injury.
- Born:
  - Joachim Ernst, German noble, last ruler of Anhalt; in Dessau, German Empire (d. 1947)
  - Kwon Ki-ok, Korean air force officer, first woman to fly an airplane in China, first Korean female aviator, co-founder of the Republic of Korea Air Force; in Sangsugu Village, Pyongyang, Korea (d. 1988)

== January 12, 1901 (Saturday) ==
- Li Hongzhang (Li Hung Chang) and Yikuang (known as the Prince Ch'ing), signing on behalf of the Chinese Emperor, acknowledged the protocol that contained the preliminary demands of the Eight-Nation Alliance for peace and for the normalization of relations following the Boxer Rebellion.
- The Electrical Review announced that the patent of Dr. Mihajlo Pupin, a professor of physics at Columbia College, had been purchased by the American Telephone and Telegraph Company (AT&T), and that it would facilitate long-distance telephone communication. Dr. Pupin had patented the loading coil in 1900, making it possible to transmit and receive sounds of the human voice regardless of the length of the land line. Dr. Pupin was paid $500,000 for the device that AT&T called "the most important invention since that of the telephone itself" that would "revolutionize the entire telephone system" equivalent to $12,000,000 in 2016.
- By a writ of habeas corpus from the Kansas Supreme Court, anti-alcohol crusader Carrie Nation was released from the Sedgwick County jail in Wichita, Kansas, where she had been held for the destruction of the bar at the Carey Hotel. Nine days after her release, Nation held an emergency meeting of the local Woman's Christian Temperance Union and was able to get volunteers to join her in her mission of ridding American cities of saloons and taverns.
- Born: Kurt Jooss, German dancer and choreographer; in Wasseralfingen (d. 1979)

== January 13, 1901 (Sunday) ==
- A statue of Robert Burns was unveiled in Walker Park, Newcastle upon Tyne, England. The statue would later be damaged, was eventually restored in the 1970s, but then destroyed by vandals in the 1980s.
- Queen Victoria made the last entry in her journal after almost 70 years of recording her daily actions. "Had a fair night", she noted, "but was a little wakeful... Rested again afterwards, then did some signing and dictated to Lenchen", using the nickname for her daughter, Princess Helena, who often appeared on her behalf. She would become ill the next day and never write another entry in her journal, kept since 1831.
- Born: A. B. Guthrie Jr. (Alfred Bertram Guthrie), American writer, recipient of the Pulitzer Prize for his novel The Way West; in Bedford, Indiana (d. 1991)

== January 14, 1901 (Monday) ==
- The first day of the 20th century was observed throughout the Russian Empire and the Ottoman Empire, which had not yet adopted the Gregorian calendar. The two large powers would use the Julian calendar until World War I, and by 1901, the difference between the two had grown to 13 days; January 1, 1901, for the rest of the world had been December 18, 1900, on the Julian calendar.
- Russia ordered the withdrawal of its troops from the Zhili province of China and moved them to Manchuria.
- France's Chamber of Deputies voted 310–110 for its continued approval of the government's treatment of religious associations.
- Members of the United States Electoral College cast their votes in their respective state capitals, and, by a margin of 292–155, formally approved the re-election of William McKinley as President of the United States. McKinley received all of the electoral votes from 28 states, including all of those above the Ohio River, and those along the Pacific Coast, along with most of the prairie states. His challenger from the Democratic Party, William Jennings Bryan, received the votes of the other 17 states, including all of the ones that had seceded during the American Civil War.
- Born: Bebe Daniels, American actress, singer, dancer, writer and producer; in Dallas (d. 1971)
- Died:
  - Víctor Balaguer i Cirera, 76, Catalan Spanish playwright and poet (b. 1824)
  - Mandell Creighton, 58, British clergyman, Bishop of London for the Church of England and historian, best known for his five-volume set The History of the Papacy During the Period of Reformation (b. 1843)
  - Charles Hermite, 78, French mathematician, known for the Hermite interpolation process and Hermite polynomials (b. 1822)

== January 15, 1901 (Tuesday) ==
- Pennsylvania would again have two U.S. Senators after a vacancy of nearly two years in one of the seats. Colonel Matthew Quay, who had been U.S. Senator from 1897 to 1899, was selected for the vacancy as the Pennsylvania General Assembly ended the stalemate. Under the state law at the time, a candidate had to receive a majority of the combined votes of all the state senators and representatives. With 248 of the 254 legislators present, 125 votes were necessary to win. Quay, a Republican, received 130 votes.
- Fred Alexander, an African American who had been arrested for the attempted rape of a white woman three days earlier, was burned alive by a lynch mob in the city of Leavenworth, Kansas. After threats had been made against both county Sheriff Peter Everhardy and the warden of the state penitentiary in Lansing, Everhardy obtained Alexander's release at 3:10 p.m., and escorted him back to the Leavenworth County jail. At 4:30 p.m., the mob broke in and dragged him from his cell, and hauled Alexander to the scene of the November 7 murder of another woman, Pearl Forbes, on Lawrence Avenue near Spruce Street. Her father, William Forbes, reportedly told the crowd, "Don't hang the brute men... Let's take him out where he murdered my daughter and burn him." The group chained Alexander to an iron stake, poured two cans of coal oil on a pile of kindling, and at 5:25, Forbes himself set Alexander ablaze. Kansas Governor William Eugene Stanley said afterward, "The Sheriff of Leavenworth is either a despicable scoundrel or a coward."
- The Allied military commanders of the Eight-Nation Alliance announced the organization of a new judicial system for China.

== January 16, 1901 (Wednesday) ==
- After arriving in the United States to begin lobbying for the building of a canal across Panama, French engineer Philippe Bunau-Varilla made his first English language public speech, at a lecture in Cincinnati, Ohio, to the Cincinnati Commercial Club and the Society of Civil Engineers. Bunau-Varilla had chosen the location because it afforded him the opportunity to be introduced to Ohio Senator Mark Hanna, the closest adviser to U.S. President William McKinley.
- James A. Mount, 57, died only two days after his term as 24th Governor of Indiana had expired.
- Born:
  - Fulgencio Batista, Cuban state leader, 9th President of Cuba, and Cuba's military dictator until his overthrow by Fidel Castro in 1959; in Banes (d. 1973)
  - Laura Riding, American poet, novelist and critic; in New York City (d. 1991)
- Died: Hiram Rhodes Revels, 73, American politician, first African-American to serve in the United States Congress (b. 1827) During the Reconstruction era, Revels was elected by the Mississippi Legislature as one of the state's two U.S. Senators.

== January 17, 1901 (Thursday) ==
- Led by Louis Couturat and Léopold Leau, the Delegation for the Adoption of an International Auxiliary Language was founded at a meeting of delegates from various "congresses" that had been interested in establishing a universal language. The delegation would work on creating an improved version of Esperanto, which would be called Ido.
- Nearly four years after leaving office, former U.S. President Grover Cleveland strongly criticized the foreign policy of the William McKinley administration, particularly its expansion and takeover of the Philippines. "We can conquer the Philippines, and after conquering them probably can govern them. It is in the strain upon our institutions, the demoralization of our people, the evasion of our constitutional limitations, and the perversion of our national mission that our danger lies," Cleveland said at the Holland Society dinner at the Waldorf Astoria Hotel in New York City. "As a distinguished bishop has said, 'The question is not what we shall do with the Philippines, but what the Philippines will do to us. Our country will never be the same again. For weal or woe, we have already irrevocably passed beyond the old lines."
- The bicentenary of the Prussian Federation was celebrated in Germany. The planned week of festivities was canceled after two days, after the announcement of the imminent death of Queen Victoria, a grandmother of Kaiser Wilhelm.

== January 18, 1901 (Friday) ==
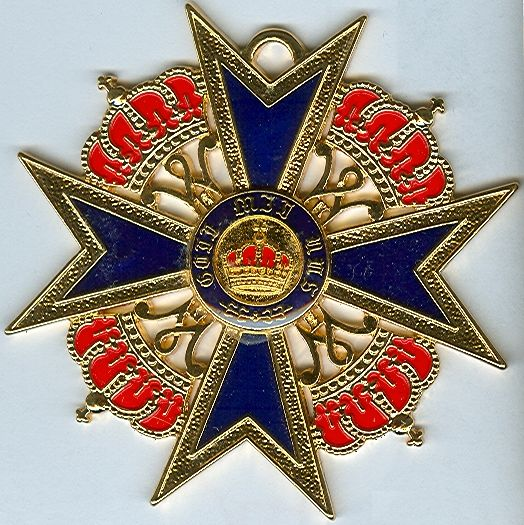
Cross of the Order of Merit of the Prussian Crown

- The Order of Merit of the Prussian Crown was established by Kaiser Wilhelm on the occasion of the bicentennial of the establishment of the Kingdom of Prussia.
- The Überbrettl, the first venue in Germany for literary cabaret, or Kabarett, opened in Berlin at Alexanderstraße No. 40. Ernst von Wolzogen, an admirer of Friedrich Nietzsche, named the locale the Buntes Theater, but soon began calling it the "Superstage" as a play on Nietzsche's Übermensch.
- Pope Leo issued the encyclical Graves de communi re. While reaffirming the Catholic Church's opposition to individualistic liberal capitalism, it also denied that the new ideals of Christian democracy were an endorsement of the principles of a democratic political system.
- Colonel Grey led a combined "force of New Zealanders and Bushmen" and routed the force of 800 Boers from Ventersburg, South Africa.
- Born: Ivan Petrovsky, Soviet mathematician, known for the Petrovsky lacuna; in Sevsk, Russian Empire (d. 1973)
- Died: Australian outlaw Jimmy Governor, 25, was hanged at the Darlinghurst Gaol in Darlinghurst, New South Wales for the July 20, 1900, murder of the Mawbey family. His accomplice, Jacky Underwood, had been executed four days earlier at the Old Dubbo Gaol in Dubbo, New South Wales.

== January 19, 1901 (Saturday) ==
- At the close of a congressional subcommittee investigation of hazing at the United States Military Academy, superintendent Colonel Albert L. Mills and four cadets presented a statement signed by all of the members of the Academy, pledging to abolish hazing. The statement, which would appear on the front pages of many American newspapers the next day, said in part "we... while maintaining that we have pursued our system from the best motives, yet realizing that the deliberate judgment of the people would, in a country like ours, be above all other considerations, do now reaffirm our former action abolishing the exercising of fourth class men, and do further agree to discontinue hazing, the requiring of fourth class men to eat anything against their desire, and the practice of 'calling out' fourth class men by class action; and that we will not devise other similar practices to replace those abandoned." The hazing practices had come to national attention after the death of first-year cadet Oscar Lyle Booz on December 3. The statement of forcing men to "eat anything against their desire" was a reference to burns sustained by Booz after tabasco sauce had been poured down his throat.
- Died: Jacques-Victor-Albert, 79, French politician and Prime Minister of France 1873 to 1874 and again in 1877 (b. 1821)

== January 20, 1901 (Sunday) ==
- "Without a protest from any Christian," as a horrified press report noted, five women and girls were openly offered for sale as slaves at a public auction in the United States. Notwithstanding the 13th Amendment and California state law, the five females had been the slaves of Leong Kow in China and continued to serve him after his immigration to San Francisco. When Mr. Leong wanted to return to his homeland, he advertised the midday sale by posting notices in the Chinatown neighborhood, and his creditors pasted their notices of claims against his estate. Four of the women were purchased, but the youngest, Leong's 12-year-old daughter, received no bids. The next day, she was rescued from her home by the local Society for the Suppression of Vice and by a Presbyterian missionary. The incident would lead to state legislative hearings investigating the practice of human trafficking that took place with the tolerance of the San Francisco police and by federal prosecutors.
- Lord Strathcona's Horse, a Canadian mounted unit, left South Africa following service in the Second Boer War. It was disbanded shortly afterwards, but would become an official regiment of the Canadian Army later in the year.
- Born: Jesús Colón, Puerto Rican writer; in Cayey (d. 1974)

== January 21, 1901 (Monday) ==
- The first RCA Victor record was created, as popular musician Vess Ossman played the banjo in a studio cut of the song "Tell Me, Pretty Maiden", from the popular musical comedy Florodora, which was pressed and released as a 10-inch disc. By 1946, RCA would sell its one billionth record.
- R. R. Racey, a British colonial official in charge of administering sections of the British protectorate in Uganda, oversaw the replacement of a prior tribal monarch of the Igala people, Musinga, the Onu of Igara. King Mosinga had committed suicide rather than leaving his kingdom to be taken by Racey to the administrative office. Racey convened a meeting of 55 sub-chiefs, who elected Musinga's young son as the Onu Mukotani of Igara. Since Mukotani was too young to govern, Racey arranged another relative, Bakora, to serve as regent and to swear allegiance to the British Empire.
- Nine days after securing her release from a jail in Wichita, Kansas, alcohol opponent Carrie Nation convened a meeting of the Woman's Christian Temperance Union and successfully persuaded other members to join her in her lone crusade of destroying places that sold liquor. That evening, she began to use a hatchet on her raids, which served as both a symbol of her cause and as an instrument for vandalism. She and three of her followers laid waste to two saloons in Wichita, and were in the process of invading a third when she was arrested by police.
- Dr. Henry V. Passage, a physician from Peru, Indiana, as well as a Democrat member of the Indiana House of Representatives, introduced one of the earliest proposals for lethal injection as a means of capital punishment. Dr. Passage proposed that an overdose of morphine should replace hanging as the state's means of executing a murderer; the proposed amendment bill was voted down along party lines.
- After recovering from a long illness, King Oscar of the United Kingdoms of Sweden and Norway resumed his governmental duties, which he had entrusted to Crown Prince Gustaf.
- Died: Elisha Gray, 65, American electrical engineer, co-founder of the Western Electric company who is sometimes credited with the invention of the telephone (b. 1835)

== January 22, 1901 (Tuesday) ==
- Queen Victoria of the United Kingdom of Great Britain and Ireland and Empress of India, died at the age of 81, at Osborne House, her residence on the Isle of Wight, at 6:30 in the evening. After a reign of more than 63 years, Victoria had ruled during the lifetimes of most living Britons. She had continued to conduct official business less than two weeks before her death. At the time of her death, the Queen was survived by six children, 32 grandchildren and 35 great-grandchildren.
- Russia completed its transfer of the Shan-hai-kwan (now Shanhaiguan Railway), built in China, to German administration.
- At least 35 people in Herre, Norway, died in a hurricane.

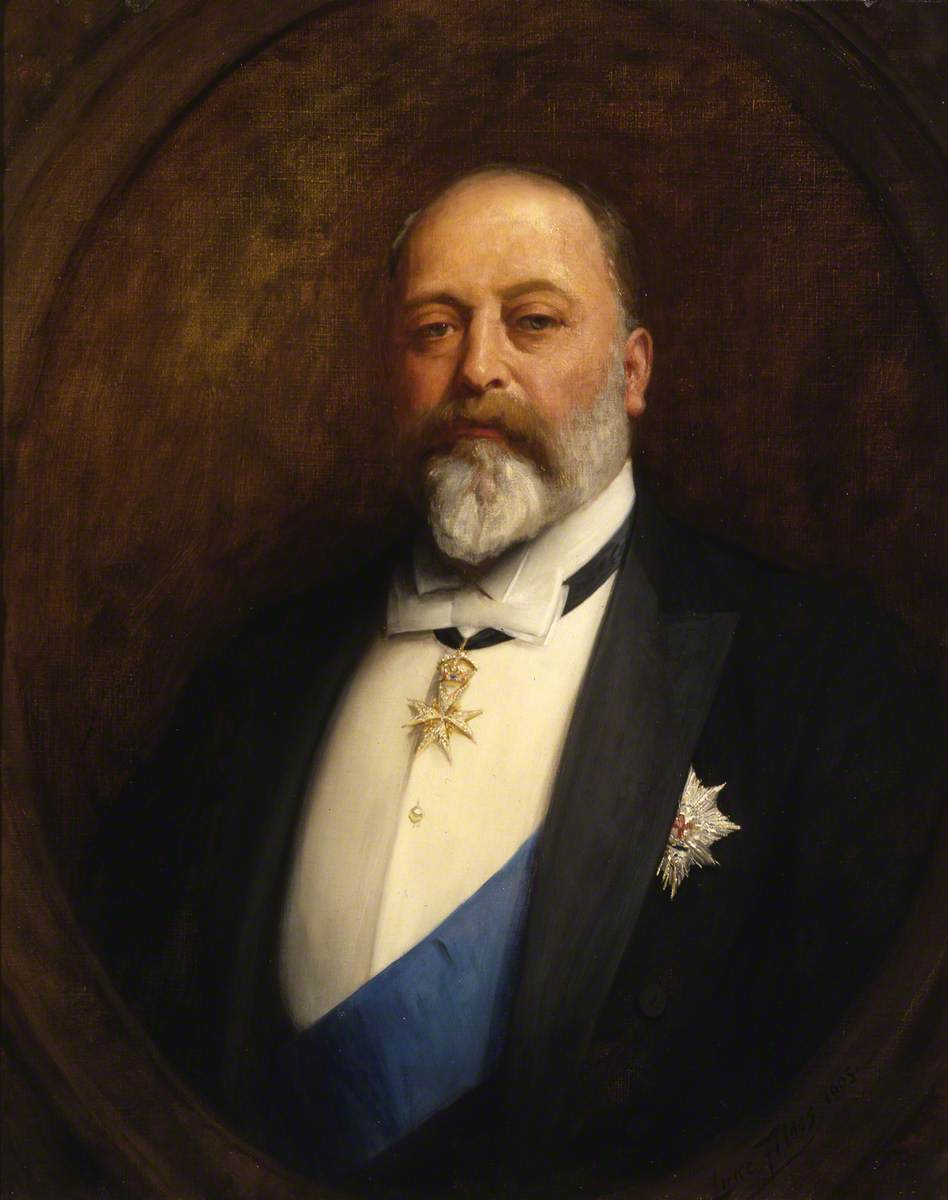
King Edward VII

- Albert, Prince of Wales, came to the throne of the United Kingdom as King Edward VII, following the death of his mother, Queen Victoria.
- In the Jamaican general election, 14 members were elected, although one indicated that he would refuse to take his seat and the others pledged to revise the constitution to remove a provision that four additional members be appointed by the Governor (at the request of the British Secretary of State for the Colonies, Joseph Chamberlain). The election also saw the first elected black member of the Council win a seat.
- In the U.S., the Grand Opera House in Cincinnati, Ohio, was destroyed in a fire, along with other adjacent buildings. Although the theater was filled with hundreds of people watching a production of Hamlet, nobody was injured. Credit was given to stage actor E. H. Sothern, who interrupted the second scene of the play to calmly request the audience to carefully make their way to the exits.
- The Scandinavian-crewed U.S. fishing vessel Commonwealth departed from Gloucester, Massachusetts with 17 crew to fish for haddock and was never seen again. It was believed to have been the casualty of a February blizzard in the Georges Bank.
- The village of Ivanhoe, Minnesota, which would become the county seat for Lincoln County, was incorporated.
- The United States Senate ratified a treaty with Spain to purchase the islands of Sibutu and Babuyan for $100,000.
- Born: Saint Alberto Hurtado, Chilean Jesuit priest who would be canonized as a Roman Catholic saint in 2005; in Viña del Mar (d. 1952)

== January 23, 1901 (Wednesday) ==
- At 9:00 in the morning, Edward VII, took the oath as the new monarch of the United Kingdom at St. James Palace, London, and the councillors assembled swore their allegiance to him. In Parliament, the members of the House of Commons and the House of Lords swore their allegiance as well.
- "Probably never before in the history of the world have there been so many flags, and of so many nations, displayed at half-mast as were floated today in memory of the dead Queen of England and Empress of India", the American press noted. Even in the United States, nearly 135 years independent of the United Kingdom, U.S. President William McKinley ordered that the American flag be lowered to half-staff at the White House and at all U.S. government buildings.
- Guglielmo Marconi sent a Wireless communication 299 km (186 mi) 'over the horizon' in the British Isles from Niton on the Isle of Wight to The Lizard in Cornwall, England.
- Mouvement des caisses Desjardins, which would become the largest association of credit unions in North America, conducted its first transactions. Operating under the name of La Caisse Populaire de Lévis, at the home of Alphonse Desjardins in the city of Lévis, Quebec, the popular credit union represented Desjardins' goal of making it possible for farmers and workers to save their earnings and to be able to borrow money at lower interest rates than were offered at banks.
- The Weekly Commoner, a new national newspaper in the United States created by William Jennings Bryan, published its first issue, with a distribution of 50,000 copies. "There will be no attempt at giving the current news," a report at the time noted. "Mr. Bryan expects to write most of the editorial comment himself, while the other articles will be contributed by noted Democrats... under his immediate supervision."

== January 24, 1901 (Thursday) ==
- In a state ceremony at Dublin Castle, Edward VII was proclaimed King of Ireland.
- Emily Hobhouse arrived at Bloemfontein concentration camp to report on conditions. Horrified by what she saw, she would write:
  "They went to sleep without any provision having been made for them and without anything to eat or to drink. I saw crowds of them along railway lines in bitterly cold weather, in pouring rain–hungry, sick, dying and dead. Soap was not dispensed. The water supply was inadequate. No bedstead or mattress was procurable. Fuel was scarce and had to be collected from the green bushes on the opes of the kopjes (small hills) by the people themselves. The rations were extremely meagre and when, as I frequently experienced, the actual quantity dispensed fell short of the amount prescribed, it simply meant famine."
- Hubert von Herkomer was commissioned by King Edward VII of the United Kingdom to paint a watercolor portrait of the recently deceased Queen Victoria as she lay in her coffin, a not uncommon practice of the day as a respectful means of preserving the final image of a person. A century later, a critic would write, as praise, "the brightness of a flowing and translucent shroud seems already to be transporting the Queen into another world."

== January 25, 1901 (Friday) ==
- Li Hongzhang and Prince Ching requested that the Eight-Nation Alliance in Beijing restore Chinese ownership of the Forbidden City, but were refused.
- Racho Petrov replaced Todor Ivanchov as Prime Minister of Bulgaria, serving as the non-party head of an interim administration.
- The survey of the Chickasaw Nation in Oklahoma, authorized by the Dawes Commission, was completed, paving the way for the allotment of lands (and the eventual dismantling) of the territory that had been set aside for the Chicasaw Indians during their forced removal from the southeastern United States. The Chickasaw Nation encompassed what are now 13 counties in south central Oklahoma (Bryan, Carter, Coal, Garvin, Grady, Jefferson, Johnston, Love, McClain, Marshall, Murray, Pontotoc, and Stephens).
- Born: Mildred Dunnock, American stage and film actress; in Baltimore (d. 1991)
- Died: Wilhelm Carl von Rothschild, 72, German noble, financier who operated the House of Rothschild in Frankfurt (b. 1828)

== January 26, 1901 (Saturday) ==
- Tomb KV44, in Egypt's Valley of the Kings, was opened by a team of archaeologists led by Howard Carter. The tomb was found to contain the mummies of ten people, the most notable of whom was Tentkerer, a woman who had served the Pharaoh Osorkon I, who reigned from 922 BC to 887 BC.
- Thirty-two captured leaders of the Filipino resistance to American rule were deported to Guam on a U.S. Navy ship which steamed out of Manila Bay to send the nationalists into exile. The 32 men had refused to take the oath of allegiance to the American territorial government, and were considered likely to foment unrest against the U.S. Territorial authorities. Foremost among the deportees was Apolinario Mabini, who had been the first Prime Minister of the First Philippine Republic during its temporary independence from Spain. Mabini would finally be allowed to return to the Philippines in 1903, two months before his death.
- Edouard Orban de Xivry, the Governor of the Luxembourg Province of Belgium, was assassinated in his office by one of his employees. Messr. Schneider asked for a meeting with the Governor. After they began talking, he drew out a revolver, shot Orban de Xivry, then killed himself.

== January 27, 1901 (Sunday) ==
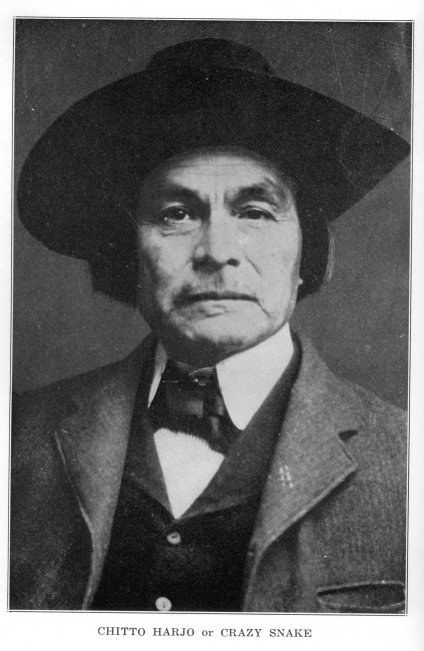
"Crazy Snake", Chitto Harjo

- Chief Chitto Harjo, a Muscogee Indian who was known in the press as Crazy Snake (a literal translation) of the Creek Indian tribe, surrendered to Lieutenant. H. B. Dixon of the Eighth U.S. Cavalry in Oklahoma. Chitto had attempted to create a government separate from the Creek Nation in order to resist the forcible acquisition of Creek lands by the federal government, and the arrest came three days after a gun battle between his Snake Indian men and a team from the United States Marshals Service.
- On the occasion of his 42nd birthday Kaiser Wilhelm was appointed an honorary Field Marshal of the British Army. King Edward, uncle of the Kaiser, personally bestowed the honor in a ceremony at East Cowes on the Isle of Wight, and presented Field-Marshall von Hohenzollern with the Order of the Garter. Queen Victoria had originally planned to make the presentation to her German grandson as a birthday gift.
- King Alexander of Serbia acquired the rank of field marshal.
- Born:
  - Willy Fritsch, German actor; in Kattowitz, German Empire (now Katowice in Poland) (d. 1973)
  - Art Rooney, American sports executive, founder and owner of the Pittsburgh Steelers; in Coulter, Pennsylvania (d. 1988)
- Died: Giuseppe Verdi, 87, Italian composer, known for his operas La traviata and Aida (b. 1813)

== January 28, 1901 (Monday) ==
- For the first time, an automobile arrived on the Indian Ocean island of Mauritius. The steamship Iraouady delivered the vehicle. By the middle of 2014, there were would be over 450,000 motor vehicles registered in the Republic of Mauritius.
- Parliamentary elections were held in Bulgaria. Despite receiving only the third highest number of votes, the Progressive Liberal Party emerged as the largest party in Parliament with 40 of the 164 seats, on a turnout of 42.7%.
- Lord Kitchener, commander of British forces in the Second Boer War, began a large-scale drive against the Boers, with 14,000 British troops being transported through the Transvaal by rail. The Orange Free State commandos were outnumbered, but managed to escape capture, while Kitchener's forces would lay waste to the landscape and clear it of civilians.
- Captain William Hardham became the first New Zealand-born recipient of the Victoria Cross. Hardham was recognized for his bravery in action in the Second Boer War.
- Sixteen people on board the steamship Holland were drowned when the vessel was wrecked at the entrance of the Maas River from the North Sea into the Netherlands.
- The British schooner Hannah, abandoned in the Irish Sea, was wrecked at Mwnt, Cardiganshire, Wales.
- At the Grand Pacific Hotel in Chicago, the American League was formally organized with intentions to become a second major baseball league, competing against the established National League and continuing with the American name that the minor Western League had taken in 1900. Four of the eight original clubs from the year before would continue with the new eight-team major league, (the Chicago White Stockings, Cleveland Blues, Detroit Tigers, Milwaukee Brewers). One team was shifted (Washington Senators, who had moved after playing in 1900 as the Kansas City Blues). Three new teams (the Boston Americans, Baltimore Orioles, and Philadelphia Athletics) would replace three 1900 teams that were voted out (the Indianapolis Hoosiers, the Buffalo Bisons, and the Minneapolis Millers). Teams were limited to 14 players and would play 140 games per season.
- Born: Richmond Barthé, American sculptor; in Bay St. Louis, Mississippi (d. 1989)
- Died:
  - Field Marshal Iosif Gurko, 72, Russian army officer, commander of the invading forces during the Russo-Turkish War, and later served as the Governor-General of Poland and oversaw the Russification of the Polish territory (b. 1828)
  - Henri de Bornier, 75, French poet and playwright (b. 1825)

== January 29, 1901 (Tuesday) ==
- China's Empress Dowager Cixi issued an imperial decree in the name of the Emperor. "After we moved out of the capital city," the Emperor's statement began, "the empress has been constantly busy with state affairs. As Emperor, I deeply regret my mistakes... we mindlessly followed the old ways, leading to the calamity we face today. Now that peace negotiations are underway, we should reform all political affairs so that the country can become strong and prosperous." The decree directed all government officials to suggest reforms during the next two months, determining "What should be done to strengthen China, develop human talent, reach fiscal balance, and build a strong army?"
- In French Algeria, Swiss travel writer Isabelle Eberhardt, who posed as the Sufi tribesman Si Mahmoud Saadi, was stabbed and severely wounded by a fanatic member of the Tidjani Muslims, who regarded her and other members of the Qadiriyya Muslims as infidels. The trauma was enough to make Eberhardt move back to Marseille. She would die in an accident in 1903.

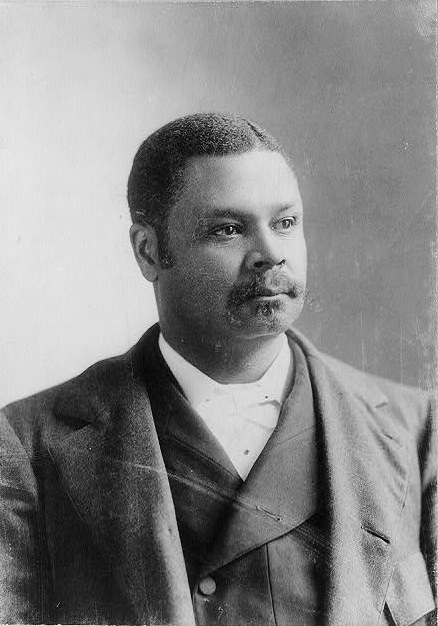
Congressman White

- U.S. Representative George Henry White of North Carolina's 2nd congressional district, the 22nd and last remaining African-American member of the United States Congress, gave his farewell speech. "This is perhaps the Negroes' temporary farewell to the American Congress," he told his colleagues, "but let me say, Phoenix-like, he will rise up some day and come again. These parting words are in behalf of an outraged, heart-broken, bruised and bleeding, but God-fearing people; faithful, industrious, loyal, rising people – full of potential force." There would not be another black member of the U.S. Congress for 28 years; in 1928, Oscar Stanton De Priest would be elected to represent Illinois's 2nd congressional district.
- Born:
  - Allen B. DuMont, American electronics engineer, innovator of the cathode-ray tube that lead to the first commercially practical television set, founder of the DuMont Television Network; in Brooklyn, New York City (d. 1965)
  - E. P. Taylor, Canadian business executive, acquired multiple beer manufacturers to build Canadian Breweries, at one time the world's largest brewing company; in Ottawa (d. 1989)

== January 30, 1901 (Wednesday) ==
- The Permanent Court of Arbitration opened its headquarters at newly constructed Peace Palace (Vredespaleis), at Prinsegracht 71 in The Hague in the Netherlands.
- A fire at the Bostock Zoo in Baltimore killed 148 animals, and two lions in the zoo were shot by employees when it appeared that they would break out of their cages. The only animals to survive the blaze at the Cyclorama Building were an elephant, a camel, two donkeys and a pack of dogs.
- The unsanitary conditions of New York's Sing Sing state prison, at Ossining, New York, led to its condemnation by the State Board of Health, prompting major reforms.
- Born:
  - Samir Al-Rifai, Jordanian state leader who served as Prime Minister of Jordan six times; in Safed, Vilayet of Syria, Ottoman Empire (d. 1965)
  - Rudolf Caracciola, German racing driver, three-time winner of the European Drivers' Championship; in Remagen (d. 1959)

== January 31, 1901 (Thursday) ==
- Anton Chekhov's Three Sisters (Три сeстры, Tri sestry) opened at the Moscow Art Theatre under the direction of Konstantin Stanislavski and Vladimir Nemirovich-Danchenko with Stanislavski as Vershinin, Olga Knipper as Masha, Margarita Savetskaya as Olga, Maria Andreyeva as Irina and Maria Lilina (Stanislavsky's wife) as Natasha.
- St. Louis sports promoter C. W. Daniels met with Chicago White Stockings owner Charles Comiskey and the new Chicago team's manager, Clark Griffith, with a proposal for a professional soccer league that would be composed of teams made up by American League baseball players, and located in AL cities, to play in the autumn. On March 17, Griffith and Baltimore Orioles manager John McGraw would stage a soccer game in St. Louis, and during the fall, a Chicago team would play at the White Stockings' ballpark, but with soccer players rather than baseball players.
- The Winnipeg Victorias of the Manitoba Hockey Association won ice hockey's Stanley Cup in the second game of a best-of-three series against the Montreal Shamrocks of the Canadian Amateur Hockey League. The game was tied 3–3 at the end of regulation time, and for the first time in Stanley Cup history, a game went into extra time. During the four minute period, Winnipeg's Dan Bain made the winning goal for the 4–3 win.
- Born: Marie Luise Kaschnitz (Marie Luise von Holzing-Berslett), German short story writer, novelist and poet; in Karlsruhe (d. 1974)
- Died: Steve Brodie, 39, American who had gained worldwide fame in 1885 after being credited with surviving a jump off of the Brooklyn Bridge, died from complications of diabetes (b. 1861)
