= Rawcliffe =

Rawcliffe may refer to:

== Places ==
- Rawcliffe, East Riding of Yorkshire
  - location of Rawcliffe railway station
- Rawcliffe Bridge, East Riding of Yorkshire
- Rawcliffe, North Yorkshire, a village located in the City of York

== Other uses ==
- Rawcliffe (surname)

== See also ==
- Out Rawcliffe (Lancashire)
