= November 1900 =

Month in 1900

<<	November 1900					>>
Su	Mo	Tu	We	Th	Fr	Sa
				1	2	3
4	5	6	7	8	9	10
11	12	13	14	15	16	17
18	19	20	21	22	23	24
25	26	27	28	29	30

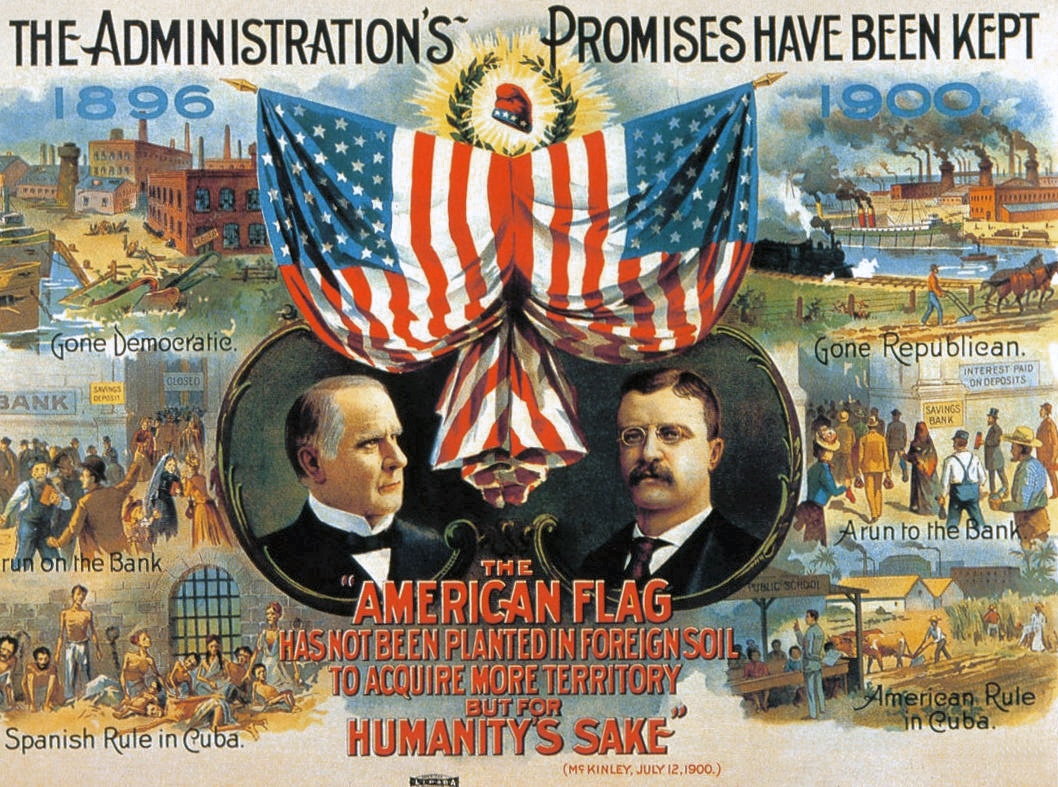
November 6, 1900: William McKinley and Theodore Roosevelt win presidential election

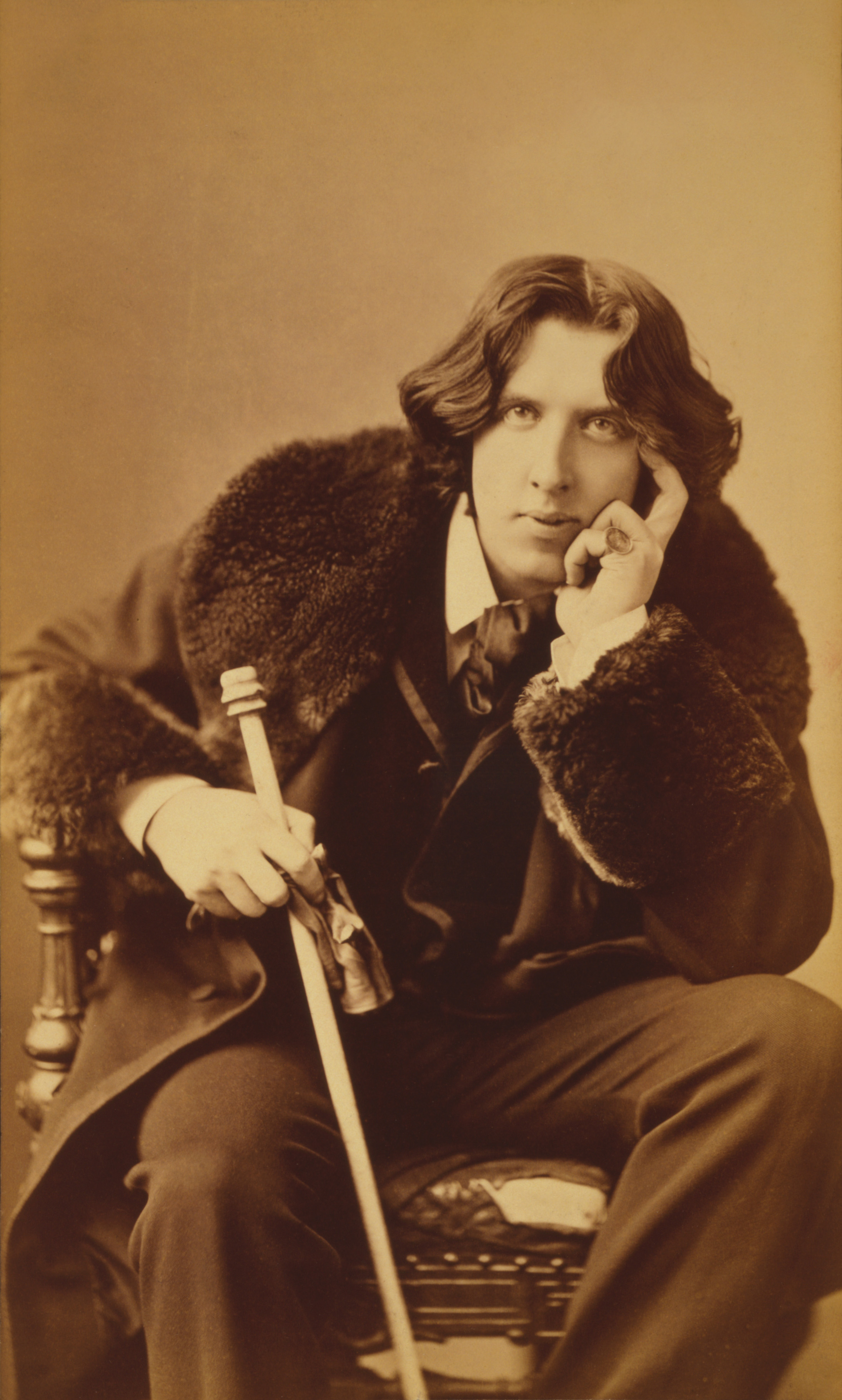
November 30, 1900: Oscar Wilde dies of meningitis

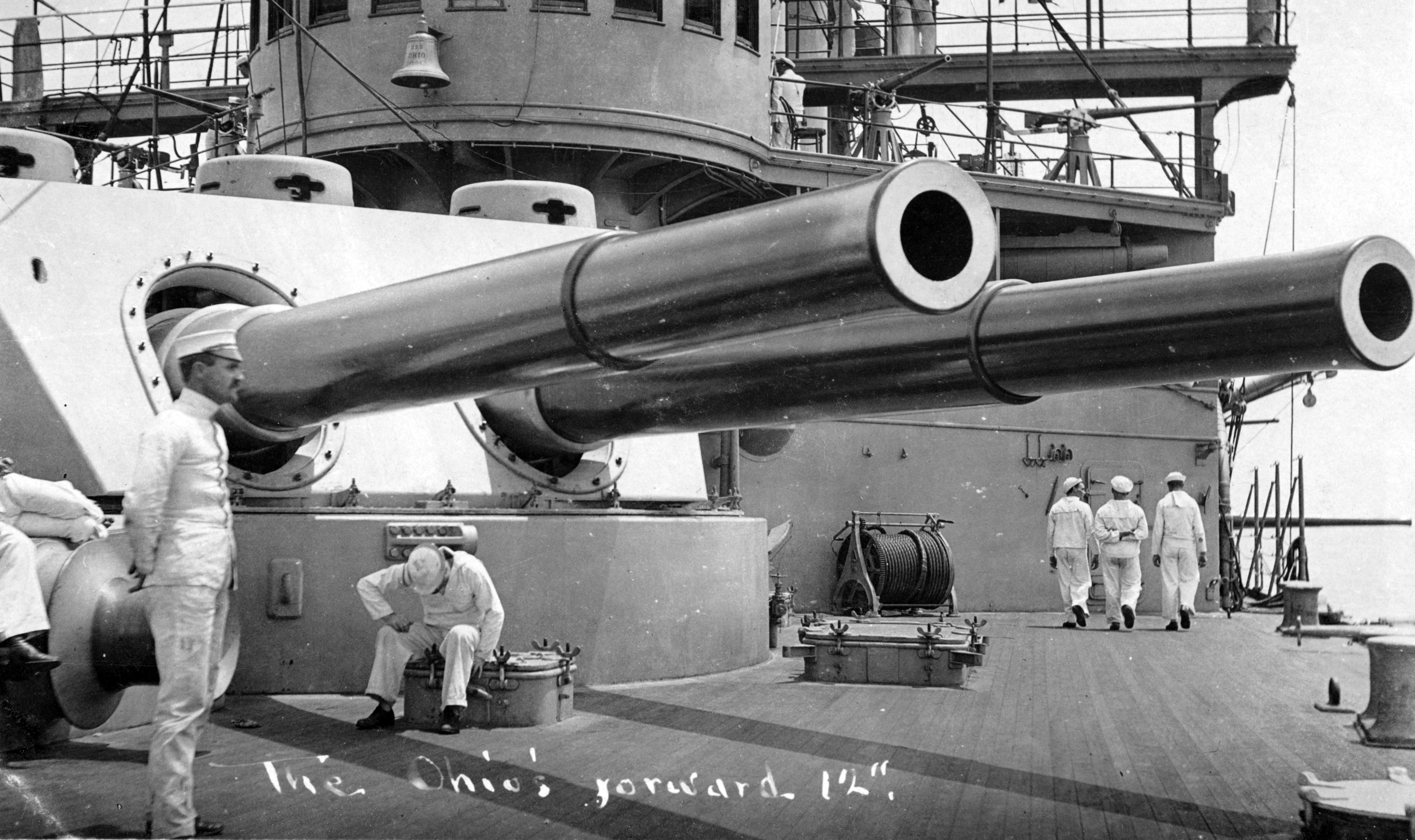
November 17, 1900: U.S. Navy demonstrates world's most powerful weapon, the 12"/40 armor-piercing gun

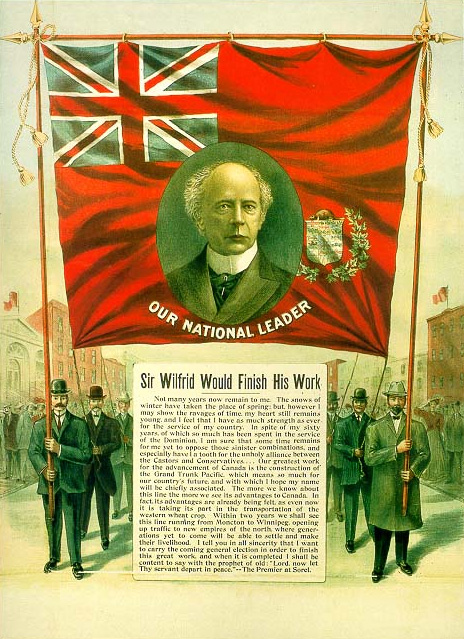
November 7, 1900: Canadian Prime Minister retains office with Liberal majority

The following events occurred in November 1900:

== November 1, 1900 (Thursday) ==
- Tsar Nicholas became seriously ill with typhoid fever, precipitating a crisis in the Russian Empire during the entire month. When it appeared that the Tsar's death was imminent, his advisors argued over whether he should be succeeded by his brother, Grand Duke Michael Alexandrovich, or, since he had no sons, by his young daughter Olga. Future Prime Minister Sergei Witte would relate later that a revision of the succession law came from the crisis, that would have allowed women to succeed to the throne. Nicholas began recovering on November 28, and would reign until being deposed during the October Revolution in 1917. Nicholas, Michael, Olga, and the rest of the royal family would be murdered in 1918.
- Pope Leo issued the encyclical Tametsi Futura Prospicientibus.

== November 2, 1900 (Friday) ==
- "Terrible Terry" McGovern successfully defended his title as featherweight boxing champion against challenger Joe Bernstein in a bout at Louisville, Kentucky.

== November 3, 1900 (Saturday) ==
- The first auto show in the United States was held at Madison Square Garden in New York City, sponsored by the Automobile Club of America. More than 70 manufacturers put on exhibits and more than 7,000 spectators appeared on the first day of what detractors called "the horseless horse show".
- The first "ground control" station was set up at Ostend, Belgium, allowing constant contact between the station and Belgian ships sailing the route between Ostend and Dover. The Princess Clementine stayed in communication with the shore during its entire journey.
- Born: Adolf "Adi" Dassler, founder of the Adidas shoe company; in Herzogenaurach (d. 1978)

== November 4, 1900 (Sunday) ==
- The Ahmadiyya movement of Islam was formally established in India by Mirza Ghulam Ahmad.
- The German Rugby Federation (Deutscher Rugby-Verband) was founded at Kassel, Germany.
- Born: Lucrețiu Pătrășcanu, Romanian activist, leading member of the Romanian Communist Party; in Bacău (executed 1954)

== November 5, 1900 (Monday) ==
- Chemist Jōkichi Takamine applied for a patent on the first chemical synthesis of a human hormone, epinephrine, which he named "adrenalin" based on the adrenal gland from which the compound is produced. The patent, granted on April 16, 1901, would make a millionaire of the Japanese-born scientist.
- At the Martí Theatre in Havana, Cuba's American Governor, Leonard Wood, opened a convention to decide on a constitution for Cuba. The convention called to order on the day before the American presidential election, would adopt a republican system of government, similar to that of the United States, on February 21, 1901.
- Born:
  - Natalie Schafer, American actress, known for role as "Mrs. Howell" on the television sitcom Gilligan's Island; in Red Bank, New Jersey (d. 1991)
  - Martin Dies Jr., American politician, U.S. Representative from Texas from 1931 to 1945, and 1953 to 1959, first chairman of the House Un-American Activities Committee; in Colorado City, Texas (d. 1972)

== November 6, 1900 (Tuesday) ==
Losing candidate Bryan

- William McKinley was re-elected as President of the United States, with 292 electoral votes over 155 for Democratic challenger William Jennings Bryan. The Republican Party increased its lead in the Senate to 57–33, and to 202–155 in the House. The popular vote was 7,219,530 for McKinley, and 6,358,071 for Bryan.
- In Denver, Colorado, a riot broke out at a polling station. As police tried to push a crowd back across the limit line, gunfire from the crowd killed Denver Police Department Special Officer Stuart K. Harvey and wounded Patrolman Samuel Charles Carpenter in the leg and lower hip. The police fired back, killing one civilian and injuring four. Carpenter would die of his injuries on January 17, 1910.

== November 7, 1900 (Wednesday) ==
- The day after voting in the United States, elections were held in Canada for the House of Commons. The Liberal Party, led by Prime Minister Wilfrid Laurier, increased its majority, with 128 of the 213 seats. Charles Tupper, former Prime Minister and leader of the Conservatives, lost re-election as representative from Cape Breton, Nova Scotia.
- With U.S. President William McKinley re-elected, Spain sold the Sulu Islands to the United States for $100,000.
- The flag and the coat of arms for Ecuador were formally adopted, after being proposed on October 31. The coat of arms, on a yellow, blue and red tricolor, depicts a condor and Mount Chimborazo.
- The People's Party was founded in Cuba.

== November 8, 1900 (Thursday) ==
- The Doubleday, Page & Company published Theodore Dreiser's novel Sister Carrie over the protests of company president Frank Nelson Doubleday, who had been on a business trip when Dreiser was offered, and accepted, a contract. Doubleday considered the novel to be immoral because its heroine was a "fallen woman". Dreiser refused to call off the deal, and Doubleday's lawyer advised the company that it had no choice but to publish. The Doubleday company did not promote the novel, and it would be the edition printed by the British Heniemann publishing firm that would gain Dreiser's fame.
- Born:
  - Margaret Mitchell, American writer, author of Gone With The Wind; in Atlanta (killed in an auto accident, 1949)
  - Charley Paddock, American athlete, two-time gold medalist in the 1920 Summer Olympics; in Gainesville, Texas (killed in a plane crash, 1943)
- Died: Sir Rajinder Singh, the Maharaja of Patiala and recipient of the Order of the Star of India, died after a short illness at the young age of 28. Educated at the University of Cambridge, he was a reform-minded ruler and was called "the best polo player in India" and "the first reigning Prince to blend the elements of the English gentleman and Indian potentate". He was succeeded by his nine-year-old son, Bhupinder, who ruled until 1938.

== November 9, 1900 (Friday) ==
- At Mukden, Manchuria, Admiral Yevgeni Ivanovich Alekseyev signed an agreement with the Military Governor of Manchuria, Tseng-sh'i, giving Russia control of the area.
- Benjamin Holt applied for the patent for the Track-Type Tractor, the continuous track or the "caterpillar track", used for heavy machinery including tanks and bulldozers. Because the tracks distribute a vehicle's weight over a larger surface than wheels can, tracked vehicles are less prone to sink or get stuck.

== November 10, 1900 (Saturday) ==
- Only 4 miles (6.4 km) from its destination of Yarmouth, Nova Scotia, the ship City of Monticello was dashed against the rocks in the Bay of Fundy, with the loss of 31 lives.

== November 11, 1900 (Sunday) ==
- The Baron de Coubertin announced that the 1904 Olympic Games would be hosted by the United States.
- The musical Florodora began its run on Broadway, a year after first being shown in London. Closing after 505 performances, it would be revived in 1902, 1905 and 1920. The six "Florodora Girls"—Marie Wilson, Agnes Wayburn, Marjorie Relyea, Vaughn Texsmith, Daisy Green and Margaret Walker—each stood 5'4 and each weighed 130 pounds.

== November 12, 1900 (Monday) ==
- The Exposition Universelle of 1900 closed in Paris. Three cannon shots fired from the Eiffel Tower signaled the end of the world's fair that had started in April.
- The United States Department of War announced that, effective December 15, the "Department of Porto Rico" would be discontinued, and that Brigadier-General George Whitefield Davis, the military governor of Puerto Rico, would be transferred to the Philippines in conjunction with the reduction of troops there.

== November 13, 1900 (Tuesday) ==
- The former auxiliary cruiser USS Yosemite was blown from her anchorage at the harbor of San Luis d'Apra, Guam by a particularly violent typhoon—first ashore and then out to sea. A steam launch from Yosemite foundered in the harbor, drowning five men: Coal Passer Joseph Anderson, Seaman George Aubel, Fireman 1 class William Davis, Apprentice 1 class Jacob L. Mehaffey and Coxswain Frank Swanson. For two days, Yosemite's crew fought heroically to save their ship, but she shipped water badly and, due to a damaged screw, made only two knots headway even after the storm passed. Finally, after the weather abated completely, her crew was taken off by the collier USS Justin, and Yosemite was scuttled.
- Arthur Jenner, Britain's Sub-Commissioner assigned to the Jubaland province in the colony of British Somaliland, was murdered on orders of two of the Chiefs of the Ogaden, Hassan Yera and Hassan Odel. Yera had been arrested earlier on Jenner's orders as part of a murder investigation.
- Valdemar Poulsen of Denmark was awarded U.S. Patent No. 661,619 for the first sound recording device, which he called the "telegraphone". In the summer of 1898, Poulsen found that a telephone, connected to an electromagnet (which, in turn moved along a piece of piano wire) could electronically store the sound of his voice; and that the sound could be "played back" to a telephone receiver by moving the magnet back over the wire.
- Born: David "Carbine" Williams, American inventor who designed the M1 carbine rifle; in Cumberland County, North Carolina (d. 1975)

== November 14, 1900 (Wednesday) ==
- After 100 players from baseball's National League jumped to the new American League – including Cy Young and Nap Lajoie – war between the circuits began and the NL declared the AL to be an "outlaw league".
- Born: Aaron Copland, American compose;, in Brooklyn, New York City (d. 1990)

== November 15, 1900 (Thursday) ==
- Carnegie Tech (now Carnegie Mellon University) had its genesis with the donation of one million dollars by Andrew Carnegie to the city of Pittsburgh, to build a college on land provided by the city. The buildings of the Carnegie Technical Schools would be constructed at Schenley Park over the next several years, and on October 16, 1905, the first 120 engineering students would be admitted.

== November 16, 1900 (Friday) ==
- The Philadelphia Orchestra gave its first public concert, conducted by Fritz Scheel. From 1912 to 1938, the orchestra would be conducted by Leopold Stokowski.
- Near Limon, Colorado, 15-year-old Preston Porter Jr. was lynched, when he was suspected of having caused the death of 11-year-old Louise Frost at the same location. Porter had made a forced confession following four days of torture in a sweatbox. At 3:45 p.m., a mob of 300 citizens stopped a train transporting Porter to the county jail and removed him from the train, with an intent to hang him. Richard W. Frost, the girl's father, was given a choice for the method of execution, and at 6:23 p.m., he set fire to a kerosene soaked pile of wood as the mob, and reporters, watched. Porter took 20 minutes to die.
- During a parade in Breslau, Germany (now Wrocław), Poland), a woman threw a hatchet at the open carriage of Kaiser Wilhelm. Selma Schnapke, later ruled to be insane, threw well enough that the "hand chopper" struck the imperial carriage, and was arrested.

== November 17, 1900 (Saturday) ==
- British Field Marshal Herbert Kitchener announced plans to "depopulate the towns in the Transvaal". In accordance with the order, the burning of farms would be discontinued, and civilians would be relocated to what became described by British MP John Ellis as "concentration camps", a term coined from "reconcentrado" camps that Spain had set up in Cuba. By October 1901, the camps would house 111,619 white and 43,780 black citizens, and have a death rate of 34 percent.
- Dr. Ernest Reynolds discovered the cause of an outbreak of alcoholic neuritis and revealed what would turn out to be one of the United Kingdom's worst scandals involving food contamination. Suspecting arsenic poisoning, Dr. Reynolds analyzed a sample of a particular brand of beer that many of the patients at the Manchester Workhouse Hospital had been drinking, and found that "it contained an appreciable amount of arsenic". Three days later, Dr. Sheridan Delepine of Owens College analyzed samples of beer from 14 Manchester breweries and found similar arsenic levels. The problem would be traced to a manufacturer of contaminated glucose used in the brewing process, and then to impure sulfuric acid used in processing the glucose. The acid manufacturer had, for eight months, been using a different system in producing the acid. In February, a royal commission would be appointed to investigate and would conclude that 6,000 poisonings, including 70 deaths, had resulted from the contaminated beer and that from November 25 to January 10, 36 of those deaths were in Manchester.
- Tests were completed at the Indian Head Proving Ground in Maryland of the most advanced American weapon up to that time. The twelve-inch 40-caliber naval gun was designed to fire shells that "would pierce any armor ever made". Forty of the guns were scheduled to be placed on new battleships and armored cruisers.

== November 18, 1900 (Sunday) ==
- Herbert Hoover, "an American mining engineer who was present at the siege of Tien-Tsin", was interviewed by The New York Times and predicted that "Unless our government adopts a more forcible policy, we will have a calamity in China that has not been equaled in the history of the world." The 26-year-old engineer, destined to become the 31st President of the United States, went on to say, "Our whole policy has been to pat a rattlesnake on the head."

== November 19, 1900 (Monday) ==
- The Colombian Navy seized the British steamship Taboga after the ship's captain refused to allow Colombian troops to be transported on the ship to Buenaventura, Valle del Cauca, Colombia.
- The Baylor University College of Medicine opened.

== November 20, 1900 (Tuesday) ==
- In a rare November tornado, 30 people in Mississippi and Tennessee were killed. Columbia, Tennessee, was struck by the fourth twister of the day, at 9:30 pm, killing 27 people and injuring 75.
- Born:
  - Chester Gould, American cartoonist, creator of Dick Tracy; in Pawnee, Oklahoma (d. 1985)
  - Billy Burch, American ice hockey player and the first American to become most valuable player in the National Hockey League; in Yonkers, New York (d. 1950)

== November 21, 1900 (Wednesday) ==
- By order of Pope Leo, all of the Ursuline congregations were united.

== November 22, 1900 (Thursday) ==
- The first Mercedes automobile was tested, and delivered to Emil Jellinek on December 22, 1900.
- Born: Tom Macdonald, Welsh journalist and writer; in Llandre, Dyfed, Wales (d. 1980)
- Died: Sir Arthur Sullivan, 58, English composer, known for his comic operas such as The Pirates of Penzance, recipient of the Royal Victorian Order, died of a heart attack before he could complete the musical score for The Emerald Isle (b. 1842)

== November 23, 1900 (Friday) ==
- The Youngstown Sheet and Tube Company was incorporated in Ohio.

== November 24, 1900 (Saturday) ==
- The "War of the Golden Stool", fifth and last of the Anglo-Ashanti wars in what is now Ghana, ended as British troops brought in 31 captured kings and chiefs as prisoners of war.
- At New Haven, Connecticut, college football's two remaining undefeated and untied teams, Yale (11–0–0) and Harvard (10–0–0), met to close the 1900 season. Yale won the unofficial national championship, 28–0.
- Night Watchman Reuben J. Chappell of the Pierce City, Missouri Police Department, a Confederate Civil War veteran, was shot while trying to arrest a man who had fired a gun in public. He would die of his wound on December 3. Chappell's death aggravated racial tensions in Pierce City due to suspicions that he was murdered by an African-American gang, one of the causes leading to the August 1901 lynchings and expulsion of Pierce City's African-American population.

== November 25, 1900 (Sunday) ==
- Cumann na nGaedheal (literally, "League of the Gaels"), a political party founded by Arthur Griffith to further the cause of Ireland's independence from the United Kingdom, held its first convention.
- Born:
  - Helen Gahagan Douglas, American politician, U.S. Representative for California from 1945 to 1951, best remembered for her Senate race against Richard Nixon in 1950; in Boonton, New Jersey (d. 1980)
  - Arthur Schwartz, American composer; in Brooklyn, New York City (d. 1984)

== November 26, 1900 (Monday) ==
- Russian Admiral Yevgeni Ivanovich Alekseyev signed an agreement with Tseng Ch'i, the Chinese Governor-General of Mukden, effectively giving the Russians freedom to control Manchuria for as long as necessary.
- There is no "Allis, Wisconsin", but on this date, the Edward P. Allis Company moved to the community of North Greenfield, Wisconsin, and became its largest employer. Two years later, the town would be incorporated as West Allis, Wisconsin.

== November 27, 1900 (Tuesday) ==
- Died: U.S. Senator Cushman Kellogg Davis of Minnesota, 62, in Saint Paul. As chairman of the Senate Foreign Relations Committee, Cushman championed American acquisition of overseas territories in Hawaii, Cuba and the Philippines. He liked to say that "I stand in the vestibule of the 20th century", but died 34 days before the end of the 19th century. He had injured his right foot in September while campaigning for U.S. President William McKinley's re-election, reportedly from "blood poisoning caused by the dye of a black silk stocking which entered his system through a slight abrasion". His last words, reportedly, were "Oh, that I might live five years more for my country's sake!"

== November 28, 1900 (Wednesday) ==
- Anton Chekhov's play The Wedding was given its first performance, making its debut at the Moscow Hunt Club.
- Died: Halcyon Skinner, eulogized as "the man who revolutionized the carpet making industry", was killed when he accidentally stepped in front of a train near his home in Yonkers, New York. In 1849, Skinner had invented various looms that lowered the costs for manufacturing carpets.

== November 29, 1900 (Thursday) ==
- Thirteen people were killed, and more than 80 seriously injured, while watching the college football game between Stanford and California. Over 100 persons had gathered on the roof of the Pacific Glass Works in Palo Alto, California, for a free view of the annual "Big Game". When the roof collapsed, many of the victims fell into vats of molten glass.
- Born: Mildred Gillars, American broadcaster, known as the Nazi propaganda radio personality "Axis Sally"; as Mildred Sisk in Portland, Maine (d. 1988)

== November 30, 1900 (Friday) ==
- The ten-member Isthmian Canal Commission, chaired by Rear Admiral John G. Walker of the United States Navy, voted unanimously to recommend to U.S. President William McKinley and to the United States Congress that the proposed canal between the Atlantic and Pacific Oceans be built across Nicaragua rather than the Colombian Departamento del Istmo, also known by the name of its departmental capital, Panamá.
- In the Philippines, 1,200 Filipino fighters surrendered to American forces at Vigan on the island of Luzon.
- Died: Oscar Wilde, 46, Irish playwright, poet and novelist, died of cerebral meningitis in room 16 of the Hotel d'Alsace at 13 Rue des Beaux Arts in Paris. His death came at 1:45 in the afternoon.
