= December 1900 =

Month in 1900

<<	December 1900					>>
Su	Mo	Tu	We	Th	Fr	Sa
						1
2	3	4	5	6	7	8
9	10	11	12	13	14	15
16	17	18	19	20	21	22
23	24	25	26	27	28	29
30	31

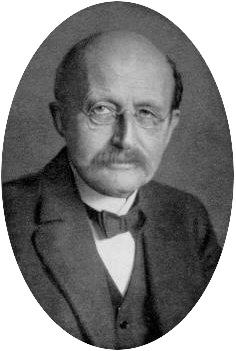
December 14, 1900: Max Planck presents the first paper on quantum mechanics, to the German Physical Society

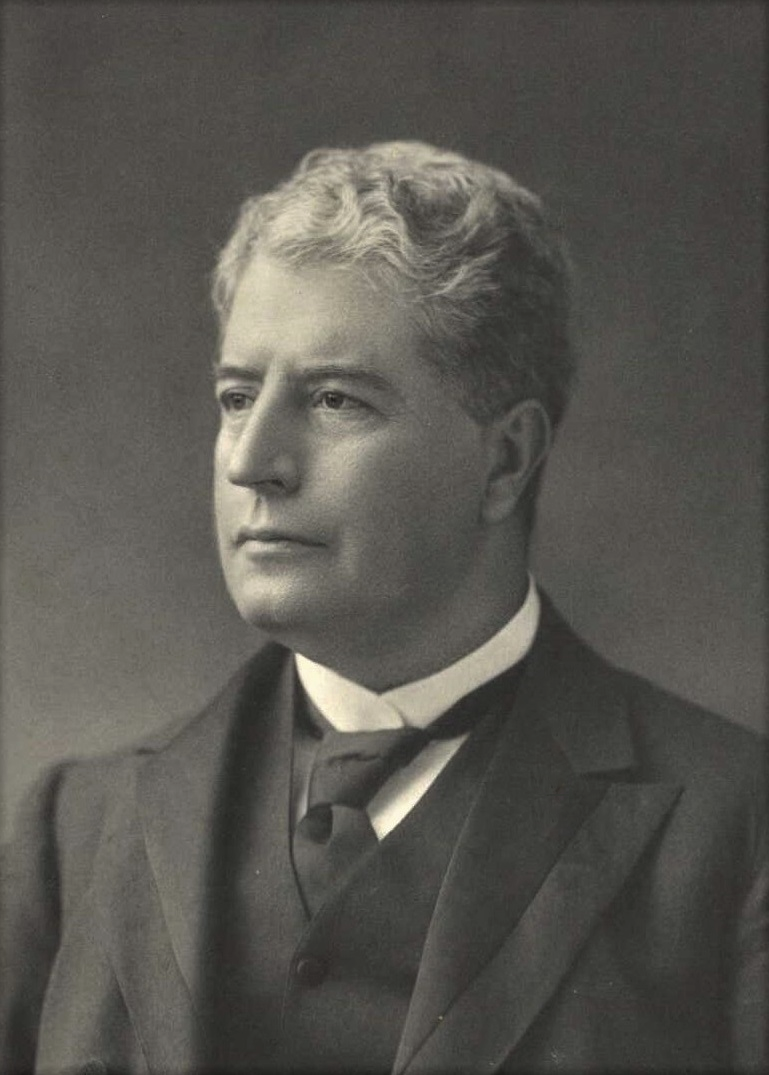
December 19, 1900: Edmund Barton selected to become first Prime Minister of Australia

The following events occurred in December 1900:

== December 1, 1900 (Saturday) ==
- A census of the German Empire was taken. Data released on February 26, 1901, showed a population of 56,345,014 "of which number 27,731,067 were males". The growth rate of 7.70% in five years was the highest increase in 30 years.
- The President of Switzerland resolved a boundary dispute between French Guiana and Brazil, awarding most of the 101,000-square-mile (260,000 km^{2}) territory to Brazil.
- In Washington, D.C., the United States and Nicaragua signed a treaty, subject to approval, giving the U.S. exclusive rights to construct and operate the Nicaragua Canal (never built), and to use the San Juan River and Lake Managua, in return for five million dollars.

== December 2, 1900 (Sunday) ==
- 2,200 Filipino rebels took an oath of allegiance to the United States at Vigan; they were the largest group to do so to that time.
- John Hossack, a farmer near Indianola, Iowa, was killed with an axe while he slept in bed. His wife Margaret was charged with the murder and convicted on April 11, 1901, but the verdict was overturned and a second trial ended with a hung jury. Susan Glaspell, who covered the case for the Des Moines Daily News, later fictionalized it in her 1916 one-act play Trifles and a 1917 short story, "A Jury of Her Peers".

== December 3, 1900 (Monday) ==
- The U.S. Supreme Court released its decision in Chesapeake & Ohio Railway Company v. Kentucky. By an 8–1 margin, the Court upheld a state law requiring racial segregation even on interstate transportation. Since Kentucky's law provided that non-white passengers had to move to cars separate from white passengers after a train entered the state, the ruling effectively made separate cars a requirement on all trains.
- The census was taken in Norway, at that time a part of a union with Sweden. Its population in 1900 was 2,221,477.
- Oscar L. Booz, 21, a first-year cadet at the U.S. Military Academy, died from internal injuries sustained four days earlier during hazing. Booz refused to name his tormentors, and the public outcry over his death resulted in a U.S. Congressional investigation that ultimately led to the cadets pledging to discontinue the long-time practice of hazing of newly admitted cadets.
- Born:
  - Ulrich Inderbinen, Swiss mountain guide; in Zermatt, canton of Valais (d. 2004)
  - Richard Kuhn, Austrian chemist, recipient of the Nobel Prize in Chemistry in 1938; in Vienna (d. 1967)

== December 4, 1900 (Tuesday) ==
- General Auguste Mercier, formerly Minister of War for France, warned the French Senate about "the possibility of war with Great Britain" and his strategy for an invasion, adding that "a landing in England is not beyond realization". Mercier suggested that his invasion plan "could be held over the head of England, like the sword of Damocles".
- Born: John Axon, British train driver, celebrated in song for his heroism in a fatal 1957 accident; in Stockport, Cheshire (d. 1957)

== December 5, 1900 (Wednesday) ==
- Germany, Austria-Hungary and Italy signed a treaty providing that their navies would work together in the event of an attack on either nation by France or Russia.
- The "War of the Golden Stool", the fifth and final Ashanti War, was declared over, with most of the British troops and Governor James Willcocks departing Kumasi.

== December 6, 1900 (Thursday) ==
- Leopold Godowsky made his professional debut as a pianist in Berlin.
- Caisse Populaire, the first cooperative bank in North America, opened in Lévis, Quebec.
- Born: Agnes Moorehead, American film and TV actress, best known for her role in the television sitcom Bewitched; in Clinton, Massachusetts (d. 1974)

== December 7, 1900 (Friday) ==
- In the American war in the Philippines, rebel leader General Emilio Verdeflor was killed in battle after being surprised by troops led by Major H.B. McCoy.
- The United States Department of the Navy invited bids for construction of new ships to double the size of the United States Navy, calling for five battleships and six armored cruisers.
- Nikola Tesla claimed to have received intelligent communication from Mars.

== December 8, 1900 (Saturday) ==
- Pope Leo issued Conditae a Christo, redefining the rights of Catholic nuns.
- The United States called off scheduled plans to send a warship to Morocco to force the sultanate to pay its debts. "The great annual religious festival of the Moors is about to begin", reported The New York Times, referring to Ramadan, adding "it is the height of impropriety for any truly orthodox person to conduct business. The Sultan could not, without risking his soul, pay any debts, or even receive an infidel who came on diplomatic business." The State Department called off the operation until the middle of February.
- James Roosevelt, American business executive, 72, and father to Franklin D. Roosevelt died while his 18-year-old son was away as a student at Harvard University.

== December 9, 1900 (Sunday) ==
- Claude Debussy's first two Nocturnes, "Nuages" and "Fêtes", had their world premiere, performed by the Lamoureux Orchestra as conducted by Camille Chevillard in Paris.

== December 10, 1900 (Monday) ==
- Carl Jung passed up a career in internal medicine to take up psychiatry, starting a position at the Burgholzli Mental Hospital, as an assistant to Eugen Bleuler.
- Germany's Admiral Otto von Diederichs presented the Imperial German Navy department with an update on the state of naval planning against the United States, noting that the Imperial German Navy had a numerical advantage over the United States Navy in the number of ships, tonnage and pieces of heavy artillery, both worldwide and in the Atlantic Ocean.

== December 11, 1900 (Tuesday) ==
- William D. Coleman, the president of Liberia since 1896, resigned under pressure after failing to extend government control further away from the capital. Coleman, a native of Fayette County, Kentucky, was replaced by Secretary of State (and Baltimore native) Garretson W. Gibson.

== December 12, 1900 (Wednesday) ==
- At a dinner in his honor at the University Club in Manhattan, Charles M. Schwab outlined a vision for a steel company that would handle everything from mining coal and iron, to the sale of steel products. J. P. Morgan was intrigued enough that he joined, along with Andrew Carnegie, John Warne Gates and other industrialists, in creating U.S. Steel.
- The city of Washington, D.C., marked its centennial as the nation's capital with elaborate ceremonies, including a proposed $1.1 million dollar addition to the White House.
- Born:
  - Mária Telkes, Hungarian physicist, inventor of thermoelectric and solar powered machinery; in Budapest (d. 1995)
  - Sammy Davis Sr., American dancer and father of Sammy Davis Jr.; in Wilmington, North Carolina (d. 1988)

== December 13, 1900 (Thursday) ==
- Albert Einstein submitted what would become his first published article in an academic journal, "Folgerungen aus der Kapillaritatserscheinungen" ("Deductions from the Phenomena of Capillarity"), to the Annalen der Physik. The paper would be accepted and published on March 1, 1901.
- Terry McGovern became undisputed lightweight boxing champion of the world in a bout in Chicago against Joe Gans, knocking him out in the second round, in a fight that many observers thought was fixed.

== December 14, 1900 (Friday) ==
- On a date now considered to be the birthday of quantum mechanics, Max Planck presented his paper Zur Theorie des Gesetzes der Energieverteilung im Normalspektrum (On the Theory of the Law of Energy Distribution in Normal Spectrum) at a meeting of the German Physical Society in Berlin.
- The 1899 Hague Convention was revised in Brussels.

== December 15, 1900 (Saturday) ==
- Soon after Lord Roberts declared that the Second Boer War was over, British troops in South Africa suffered a surprise defeat and the capture of hundreds of their men by the Boer attackers led by General P.H. Kritzinger. A total of 573 men in four companies of the Northumberland Fusiliers were taken prisoner at the battle of Magaliesberg. At Zastron on December 13, 120 British soldiers stationed there were captured by the Boers.
- In one of the earliest "bad trades" in baseball, the Cincinnati Reds sent rookie pitcher Christy Mathewson to the New York Giants in return for legendary pitcher Amos Rusie. Both were future Hall of Fame stars, one rising (Mathewson went on to win 373 games) and the other falling (Rusie pitched only 22 innings for Cincinnati).

== December 16, 1900 (Sunday) ==
- The German training frigate Gneisenau, with 450 naval cadets on board, sank in a storm during exercises off of the Spanish coast at Málaga, drowning 136.
- In Rome, the "Mediterranean Agreement" was signed by France and Italy, providing that if France extended influence in Morocco, it would not oppose Italian occupation of Cyrenaica and Tripoli (now Libya).
- George Bernard Shaw's play, Captain Brassbound's Conversion in London.
- Born: Rudolf Diels, German party official, founder of the Gestapo; in Berghausen, Germany. Diels escaped prosecution after World War II, but died November 18, 1957, in a hunting accident.

== December 17, 1900 (Monday) ==
- The Guzman Prize, first and only prize ever offered for communication with extraterrestrials, was announced in Paris. A prize of 100,000 francs was provided, except for communication with Mars, which was considered too easy.
- Ellis Island's processing center reopened, after an 1897 fire. The Kaiser Wilhelm III brought 654 Italian immigrants, who were first of the 2,251 who come through on that day.

== December 18, 1900 (Tuesday) ==
- Fifteen-year-old Edward Cudahy Jr., whose father was an official at the Cudahy Meatpacking Company, was kidnapped by two men in front of his home at Omaha, Nebraska. Eddie was released on December 20 after his father paid $25,000 in gold.
- American diplomat Joseph Hodges Choate met for several hours in London with Foreign Secretary Lord Lansdowne, over the two nations' sudden disagreement on China policy. It turned out that a misunderstanding had been created by an error in the transmission of a cabled telegram over the use of the word "irrevocable".

== December 19, 1900 (Wednesday) ==
- Governor-General of Australia Earl of Hopetoun passed up favorite Edmund Barton as his choice for the Commonwealth's first prime minister, selecting instead Sir William Lyne, in a decision memorialized as the Hopetoun Blunder. When key leaders said that they would not serve under Lyne, who had opposed the federation, Lyne withdrew on December 24, and Barton became the first prime minister of Australia on January 1, 1901.
- The Imperial Russian Navy established a special committee to evaluate construction of a submarine fleet.

== December 20, 1900 (Thursday) ==
- By a 55–18 vote, the United States Senate ratified the treaty with the United Kingdom regarding the Nicaragua Canal, but with three amendments, including an American defense of the canal. The United Kingdom refused to ratify the altered treaty by the March 5, 1901, expiration. United States Secretary of State John Hay and British Ambassador Lord Pauncefote signed a new treaty in 1901 that was ratified by both nations in 1902.
- General Arthur MacArthur declared martial law over the Philippines under General Order 100. Philippine civilians who supported the rebels or stayed neutral would be subject to arrest, along with exile and even the death penalty.
- Astronomer Michel Giacobini spotted the Giacobini-Zinner comet, which came back around on October 23, 1913, and was spotted by Ernst Zinner.
- Born: Marinus van der Goes van Naters, Dutch politician, member of Dutch legislation from 1937 to 1940, and 1945 to 1967, imprisoned as a German prisoner of war during World War II; in Nijmegen (d. 2005)

== December 21, 1900 (Friday) ==
- In Havana, John J. Moran volunteered to infect himself with yellow fever in order to confirm that the disease was spread by blood and not by air. At noon, Moran went into a room filled with infected mosquitoes and stayed for 30 minutes, getting bitten 7 times. Two other volunteers in the same room were protected by a mosquito-proof screen, breathed the same air, and stayed well. Moran became seriously ill, but survived and lived until 1950.
- The Philippine Commission, operated by the United States to govern the Philippines, directed that all of the islands' laws be printed in the English language.
- Died:
  - Count Leonhard von Blumenthal, 90, Prussian army officer, field marshal who spared the city of Paris during the successful invasion in the Franco-Prussian War (b. 1810)
  - Frederick Richard Pickersgill, 80, British painter and illustrator (b. 1820)

== December 22, 1900 (Saturday) ==
- In Beijing, at 11:00, the ministers of the Western nations and Japan signed the diplomatic note setting out conditions for China to accept.
- Born: Alan Bush, British composer, pianist and conductor; in London (d. 1995)

== December 23, 1900 (Sunday) ==
- Reginald Fessenden made the first use of amplitude modulation (the basis for AM radio) for wireless transmission of the human voice in Maryland. Two towers, set a mile apart on Cobb Island in the Potomac River, were used for the experiment. Fessenden said "One, two, three, four. Is it snowing where you are, Mr. Thiessen? If it is, would telegraph back to me?" Alfred Thiessen telegraphed back that it was snowing.
- Foot binding in China was officially outlawed by decree of the Empress Dowager Cixi, after centuries of the practice of stunting the growth of girls' feet, and years of lobbying against it.
- With the encouragement of the American government, prominent Philippine citizens founded the Partido Federal, which advocated American statehood for the Philippines.

== December 24, 1900 (Monday) ==
- The foreign powers presented their 12 conditions for reform to the Chinese Imperial government. In return for allowing the Emperor to come back to Beijing, China was to reduce its military, punish Boxer rebels, and pay $500,000,000 to the eight nations over a period of 60 years.
- Iskra, a newspaper published by Vladimir Lenin in support of Bolshevik rebellion in Russia, was published for the first time, printed in Leipzig, Germany.
- Pope Leo conducted ceremonies to close the Holy Year, with the closing of the holy door in St. Peter's Basilica a year after it had been opened. The event was witnessed by 80,000 and not done again until 1925.
- United States Secretary of War Elihu Root forever barred the hereditary right of slaughtering which had been granted a monopoly to the descendants of the Countess of Buena Vista.
- After 45 years, the last horse-drawn street car was retired from service in Boston, to be replaced by electric trolleys and elevated trains.
- Born: Hawayo Takata, Japanese healer, last of the Reiki Masters; in Hanamaulu, Hawaii Territory (d. 1980)

== December 25, 1900 (Tuesday) ==
- The National Basket Ball League was the first professional basketball circuit in the United States, founded in 1898. In an NBBL game on Christmas night in Trenton, New Jersey, referee L.P. Pratt was attacked by an angry mob of Trenton Nationals fans, upset when he declared a forfeit in a game against the visiting Penn Bikers of Philadelphia. The Bikers were leading 23–11 at the half. Trenton's Harry Stout called Pratt a "stiff" and a "lobster" and was ejected from the game, then came out during the second half. Pratt declared a 4–0 forfeit in favor of Penn and, according to the Trenton paper, the mob was chanting "Kill him!". Three city policemen escorting Pratt were also injured. The Nationals, defending NBBL champs, went on to finish second to the New York Wanderers in the 1900–01 season.
- Born: Antoni Zygmund, Polish mathematician, author of Trigonometric Series, in Warsaw (d. 1992)
- Died: Jane Spencer, 74, personal attendant for Queen Victoria who had served as Lady of the Bedchamber for 46 consecutive years since 1854; the Queen would pass away four weeks later.

== December 26, 1900 (Wednesday) ==
- A strange disappearance in the Flannan Isles of Scotland was realized when the lighthouse supply ship Hesperus stopped at the Scottish island of Eilean Mòr. The three men in charge of keeping the lighthouse at this remote location had vanished without explanation. The last entry in the logbook had been for December 15, and there was no sign of a crime, but the three men were not found after a search of the island. An official investigation concluded later that the three were probably washed off a precipice by a high wave. The mystery was later the subject of a 1980 chamber opera by Peter Maxwell Davies, The Lighthouse.
- Died:
  - William George Beers, 57, Canadian dentist sports executive, known as the "father of modern lacrosse" for codifying the rules and establishing league play, died of heart disease (b. 1843) "Beers, William George", by J. Thomas West, in Dictionary of Canadian Biography
  - Ghulam Muhammad Tarzi, 70, Afghan noble, ruler of Kandahar and Baluchistan; in Afghanistan (b. 1830)

== December 27, 1900 (Thursday) ==
- Carrie Nation destroyed the elaborate bar at the Carey Hotel in Wichita, Kansas, including a crystal chandelier, the Venetian mirror behind the bar, and a large and provocative painting, Cleopatra at the Bath.
- Amnesty took effect for everyone connected with the Dreyfus affair in France.
- Died: William Armstrong, 90, English engineer and inventor, best known for creating the Armstrong gun used in British warfare throughout the 19th century, as well as the first scientist to be elevated to the House of Lords (b. 1810)

== December 28, 1900 (Friday) ==
- Morning newspapers across United States ran the horrifying news that forty-nine school children had drowned the night before while ice skating near What Cheer, Iowa, though many emphasized that it was unconfirmed. By afternoon, the story was confirmed to have been a macabre practical joke.
- Mathematician Luther P. Eisenhart presented the first demonstration of the impossibility of a triply asymptotic system of surfaces, at a meeting of the American Mathematical Society.
- The first steel produced by electrometallurgy (from an electric furnace) was delivered, 9,000 kg of bars from the Heroult Company to Schneider & Co.
- Yu Hsien, former governor of Shansi Province in China, was executed for atrocities committed during the Boxer Rebellion.
- Died: Alexandre de Serpa Pinto, 54, Portuguese explorer, died from heart failure at his home. The city of Serpa Pinto in Angola had been named in his honor until that nation became independent in 1975, and the name was changed to Menongue. (b. 1846);

== December 29, 1900 (Saturday) ==
- In a milestone for medical ethics, a regulation from the Prussian Ministry for Religious, Educational, and Medical Affairs was the first known law requiring that medical experiments be done only with "informed consent" of a patient.
- Negotiations for purchase of the future United States Virgin Islands from Denmark were completed by the United States Department of State, which announced that all that remained to be done was an appropriation by the United States Congress to complete the agreed-upon price for the Danish West Indies, twelve million kroner, worth $3,216,000 in U.S. dollars at the time. However, Congress would not actually provide the required amount until 1918.
- The bankruptcy of the London and Globe Finance Corporation led to panic on the London Stock Exchange and led to the suspension of stock sales of thirteen smaller companies.
- A multi-professional sports club, Paulistano, was founded in Cerqueira César area, São Paulo, Brazil.

== December 30, 1900 (Sunday) ==
- On the last Sunday of the century, the New York Herald published Mark Twain's "A Greeting from the 19th Century to the 20th Century", while the New York World published the article "New York as It Will Be in 1999".
- With Edmund Barton cleared to become the first prime minister of Australia, the first Barton cabinet was created. In addition to being premier, Barton was the minister for exterior affairs. Selected to advise him were Alfred Deakin (Attorney General); Sir William Lyne (Home Affairs); George Turner (Treasurer); Charles Kingston (Trade and Customs); Sir James Dickson (Defence); and Sir John Forrest (Postmaster).
- An imperial edict proclaimed an armistice and designated Chinese representatives authorized to negotiate with the Great Powers.

== December 31, 1900 (Monday) ==
- At 3:00 in the afternoon in Beijing, Su-Hai, identified as the man who had killed Clemens von Ketteler, Germany's minister to China, on June 20, became the last prominent person to die in the 19th century. Su-Hai was beheaded at the scene of the crime.
- Christian churches around the world welcomed in the new century with special services beginning an hour before midnight, and the ringing of bells.
- Purists celebrated the arrival of the 20th century. In New York City, crowds gathered at City Hall Park in view of the big clock at City Hall. John Philip Sousa's band began playing at 10:45 pm, and at 11:59, the city was darkened for a minute, before the 20th century was welcomed in with fireworks.
