= Rawcliffe (surname) =

Rawcliffe is a surname. Notable people with the surname include:

- Derek Rawcliffe (1921–2011), English clergyman and writer
- Gordon Rawcliffe (1910–1979), English electrical engineer and academic
- Ian Rawcliffe, English-born president of the German Rugby Federation
- Mary Rawcliffe, American soprano
