= Ralph Götz =

President of the German Rugby Federation from 2011 to 2013

President of the German Rugby Federation
- In office 16 July 2011 – 6 July 2013
- Preceded by: Claus-Peter Bach
- Succeeded by: Ian Rawcliffe

Personal details
- Born: 15 May 1967

Ralph Götz (born 15 May 1967) was the President of the German Rugby Federation from 2011 to 2013. He succeeded Claus-Peter Bach at this position.

Götz, whose father was for many years the President of the Baden-Württemberg Rugby Union, started playing rugby at an early age.

Götz played in two youth internationals for Germany, against Denmark and Poland. He worked as a youth coach at his club, SC Neuenheim.

On 16 July 2011 he was elected as President of the German Rugby Federation after the incumbent Claus-Peter Bach did not stand for reelection. At the time of his election the DRV was close to insolvency caused by subsidiaries being withheld by the German federal ministry of the interior after a disagreement between the ministry and the DRV.

Götz announced in March 2013 that he would not be standing for another term as DRV president at the next election on 6 July 2013 in Hanover. He was replaced in his position by Ian Rawcliffe, who had previously been President of the German Federation from 1996 to 2004.
