= Claus-Peter Bach =

German Rugby administrator

- Occupation: Sports journalist
- Known for: President of the German Rugby Federation (2005-2011); President of the SC Neuenheim; President of the Baden-Württemberg Rugby Union (2011- )

Claus-Peter Bach was the President of the German Rugby Federation from 2005 to 2011. He succeeded Bernd Leifheit at this position. He lives in Plankstadt, Germany, and is a sports journalist by profession.

The president of the German Rugby Federation, the DRV, is elected for a two-year period and Bach has been confirmed in his office twice since election in 2005.

On club level, he is a member of the SC Neuenheim. He is the second member of this club to hold this position, Hans Baumgärtner having been the first, from 1974 to 1985.

Bach's aim was to develop the sport of rugby in Germany and for the national team to reach the 2015 Rugby World Cup.

Bach came under criticism when he promised four German rugby players, Raphael Pyrasch, Mustafa Güngör, Fabian Heimpel and Bastian Himmer, that they could join the Sportkompanie of the Bundeswehr, a special sports unit within the German Army. This was however not the case, with no places available in the unit for male rugby players until 2012. This led to great resentment by the players towards the DRV and its then-chairman because all four had turned down other options in favour of the promised place in the Sportkompanie.

Bach announced in early 2011 that he would not be available for another term as president of the DRV when his position is up for reelection on 17 July 2011, at the annual conference of German rugby in Hanover.

The German Rugby Federation suffered a major crisis in 2011, finding itself close to insolvency, being €200,000 in debt. The situation was brought on by the annual grant of the German federal ministry of the interior, BMI, not being paid in 2010 after the ministry voiced concerns that the DRV was not using the money for the desired purpose, to support the sport. A legal battle that the DRV chairman Bach fought with the ministry did not bring the desired result but instead worsened the situation. Bach consequently announced he would not stand for another term in July 2011 and was replaced by Ralph Götz. The DRV was able to secure a private loan to survive and hopes to attract sponsors that had withdrawn under Bach as well as to reach a settlement with the BMI.

Bach criticised the German federal ministry of the interior for its role in the almost-insolvency of the DRV in an interview with the Westdeutsche Allgemeine Zeitung in August 2012.

== Publications ==
- Claus-Peter Bach: Rugby Verständlich Gemacht, (in German) ISBN 3-7679-0388-1
- Claus-Peter Bach: 100 Jahre Deutscher Rugby-Verband, (in German), Gehrden, Schroeder-Druck & Verlag GbR, 2000
