= 1901 Jamaican general election =

General elections were held in Jamaica in January 1901. The newly elected Legislative Council was opened on 26 February.

== Background ==
During 1900 there had been protests from the elected members of the Legislative Council over the addition of four extra appointed members by the Governor (at the request of the British Secretary of State for the Colonies, Joseph Chamberlain) on 20 February. As a result, the 14 elected members had walked out of the Assembly. The following day they returned to make a formal protest, but would continue to abstain from involvement in the work of the Council.

Governor Olivier attempted to mediate by suggesting that the additional four members would only vote on matters of "paramount importance". However, after Chamberlain refused to make a commitment to the number of appointed members, the leader of the elected members circulated a manifesto to the others promising that they would continue to abstain from the Council if re-elected. After only five of the other 13 elected members signed it, the leader subsequently resigned and announced his retirement from politics.

== Results ==
Of the 14 members elected, only one indicated that they would refuse to take their seat, whilst the majority indicated that they would work within the constitution to remove the four additional members. The election also saw the first elected black member of the Council win a seat.

Voter turnout was low, with only 2,300 people out of 8,000 registered voters taking part.
