= October 1900 =

Month of 1900

<<	October 1900					>>
Su	Mo	Tu	We	Th	Fr	Sa
	1	2	3	4	5	6
7	8	9	10	11	12	13
14	15	16	17	18	19	20
21	22	23	24	25	26	27
28	29	30	31

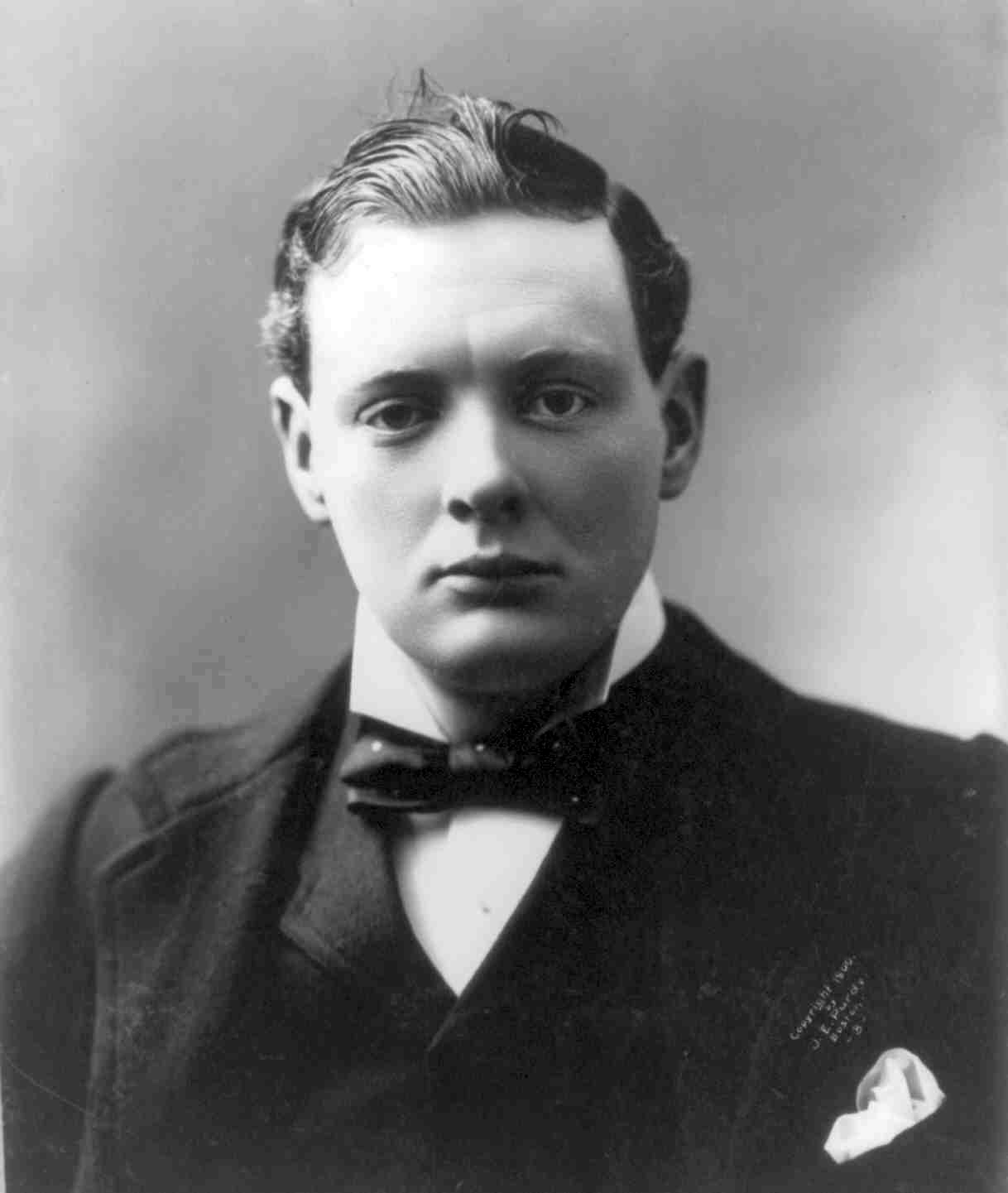
October 1, 1900: 25-year old Winston Churchill elected to House of Commons

The following events occurred in October 1900:

== October 1, 1900 (Monday) ==
- Winston Churchill, 25, was elected to the House of Commons of the United Kingdom as one of two Members of Parliament from the constituency of Oldham. Running on the Conservative ticket, Churchill had a margin of only 222 votes over his Liberal Party opponent, Walter Runciman.
- After passing the entrance examinations and gaining admission to Radcliffe College, Helen Keller began classes. "The many friends of Helen Keller, the phenomenal blind deaf-mute, will be gratified to learn that she has passed the entrance examination to Radcliffe College with flying colors ...", The New York Times noted on its front page of October 8.
- American Telephone and Telegraph Company (AT&T) created a separate "Department of Long Distance Lines".
- The Detroit Evening Times was established by publisher James Schermerhorn.
- Born:
  - Tom Goddard, English cricketer, fifth-highest wicket taker in first-class cricket; in Gloucester, Gloucestershire (d. 1966)
  - Bruno Klopfer, German-born U.S. psychologist (d. 1971)

== October 2, 1900 (Tuesday) ==
- In Munich, Prince Albert, nephew of King Leopold of Belgium, married Duchess Elisabeth of Bavaria. King Leopold, who had no male heirs, had the right to appoint his own successor, but waited to see if Albert intended to marry before naming Albert as the heir to the throne. Prince Emmanuel, who had married Albert's older sister, Princess Henriette, is said to have been King Leopold's backup if Albert had not married. After he and Elisabeth had two sons, Albert was named heir to the throne and became King of Belgium upon Leopold's death in 1909.
- The Irish merchant ship Rathdown departed from Yokohama in Japan toward Port Townsend, Washington in the U.S. after having delivered a shipment of oil. With a crew of 28, including the ship master, H. W. Dyke, the ship never arrived at its destination and was presumed lost at sea. A board of inquiry concluded that Rathdown likely encountered severe weather in the Pacific Ocean sometime on or after October 11, based on the reports from another vessel that had been making the crossing at the same time.

== October 3, 1900 (Wednesday) ==
- Apolinario Mabini, who had been the first Prime Minister of the First Philippine Republic during its temporary independence from Spain, was briefly released from prison by American authorities despite his refusal to take an oath of allegiance to the United States. After continuing his criticism of the American territorial administration and of Filipino collaborators, Mabini would be re-arrested, and deported to Guam.
- The Dream of Gerontius, written by Edward Elgar, was first performed in Birmingham, England. With less than two weeks of rehearsal, the debut under the direction of Hans Richter was a disaster. One observer noted that the concert "seemed to continue for an eternity ... it was evident that the chorus did not know the parts they were trying to sing ... The whole thing was a nightmare."
- The Wright brothers began their first manned glider experimental flights at Kitty Hawk, North Carolina, three years before their powered flight.
- Born: Thomas Wolfe, American writer; in Asheville, North Carolina (d. 1938)

== October 4, 1900 (Thursday) ==
- U.S. Democratic presidential candidate William Jennings Bryan denounced the administration of U.S. President William McKinley for permitting slavery to exist in American territory. "We fought then", said Bryan of the American Civil War, "for the adoption of a constitutional amendment that provided that no man could own a slave, and yet before the Philippine war is ended we have the Sulu treaty, which recognizes slavery."
- Born: Trinidad de Leon-Roxas, Filipino socialite, First Lady of the Philippines 1946–1948 as the wife of Manuel Roxas; in San Miguel, Bulacan (d. 1995)
- Died: Charles Alexander Mentry, founder in 1876 of the town of Mentryville, California, was stung by an insect and died at the age of 54. Without him, the Los Angeles County town would steadily decline in population and be abandoned by the 1930s, with the exception of Mentry's house.

== October 5, 1900 (Friday) ==
- Cipriano Castro, the President of Venezuela, rescinded an 1883 decree and allowed free navigation to all nations of the Orinoco River. The Orinoco Steamship Company, which had an exclusive contract for use of the river, sued the Republic of Venezuela and lost.

== October 6, 1900 (Saturday) ==
- The Orange Free State was declared to be annexed to the British Empire as the Orange River Colony.
- On the Principle of Homotyposis and Its Relation to Heredity was submitted by Karl Pearson to the Royal Society, advancing his theory of heredity.
- The Brooklyn Superbas clinched the championship of baseball and the National League pennant with an 8–6 win over Philadelphia, as the second place Pittsburgh Pirates lost 4–3 at St. Louis. With three games left, Brooklyn could finish no worse than 81-55 (.595) and Pittsburgh, with 7 games left, could finish no better than 81-58 (.582).
- Phi Mu Alpha, "the professional fraternity for men in music", was founded in Philadelphia.
- In China, revolution broke out in Huizhou, in the Guangdong Province, after Sun Yat-sen called on the Revive China Society (Xingzhonghui) to begin an insurrection. Several hundred men, under the command of Zheng Shilian, began the attack on government offices in Shenzhoutian, and the revolt spread to Shawan and Zhenlong. The rebels were defeated by October 23.
- Born: Stan Nichols, English cricketer, all-rounder for England cricket team; at Newark-on-Trent, Nottinghamshire (d. 1961)

== October 7, 1900 (Sunday) ==
- Max Planck hosted fellow physicist Heinrich Rubens for tea, and considered news that Rubens' experiments had contradicted Planck's theories. Later that evening, Planck reviewed his calculations and refined them to what would be announced, on October 19, as Planck's law or the radiation distribution function.
- German association football club Holstein Kiel is founded.
- Born: Heinrich Himmler, German party official, Reichsführer of the Schutzstaffel (SS) 1929 to 1945; in Munich (d. 1945, committed suicide following arrest)

== October 8, 1900 (Monday) ==
- Upon arriving on HMS Mildura at the island of Rarotonga, Lord Knox, Governor of New Zealand, presented the five Ariki with a Deed of Cession for them to sign, permitting the United Kingdom to annex the Cook Islands, but placing them within the jurisdiction of New Zealand.

== October 9, 1900 (Tuesday) ==
- The Paris Aero Club sponsored the Gran Prix of ballooning, with six balloons lifting off at 5:20 pm from Vincennes, France to fly east toward Russia. Count Henri de la Vaulx and Count de Castillen de Saint-Victor, flying the Centaure, arrived in the Ukrainian city of Korostyshiv, 33 3/4 hours later, after flying 1,153 miles (1,856 km) to win the race.
- The entire city of Paris was awarded France's Legion of Honour, joining such towns as Chalon-sur-Saône, Tournus and St. Jean de Losne.
- An earthquake of 8.3 magnitude occurred off the coast of Alaska, but caused no significant damage.

== October 10, 1900 (Wednesday) ==
- The Wright Glider No. 1 was wrecked after the Wright brothers put it through its third test. The glider was tethered to a wooden derrick and controlled with various cables, but a 30-mile-per-hour (48 km/h) gust tore the apparatus. After the crash, the Wrights abandoned the derrick as unsafe and, eight days later, flew on the rebuilt glider without restraints, a giant step forward in manned flight.
- Born: Helen Hayes, American actress, recipient of the Academy Award for Best Actress for The Sin of Madelon Claudet and recipient of the Presidential Medal of Freedom; in Washington, D.C. (d. 1993)

== October 11, 1900 (Thursday) ==
- Escorted by Russian troops, Li Hongzhang, the Viceroy of Zhili, arrived in Beijing to negotiate terms of peace, on behalf of China's Imperial Government, with the Eight-Nation Alliance.
- Born: Boris Yefimov, Soviet Ukrainian political cartoonist; in Kiev (d. 2008)

== October 12, 1900 (Friday) ==
- The first members of the Hall of Fame for Great Americans were selected in voting by 100 judges, with 51 votes needed for admission. George Washington had 97, followed by Abraham Lincoln and Daniel Webster with 96 each.
- The submarine force of the United States Navy began with the commissioning of USS Holland, purchased for $150,000 in April. The Holland, which could carry seven men and four torpedoes, was scrapped in 1910.

== October 13, 1900 (Saturday) ==
- Major General Leonard Wood, U.S. Military Governor of Cuba, met with Major Walter Reed in Havana and gave the authorization for further funding of experiments to establish that yellow fever was spread by the mosquito Aedes aegypti. One author has described this as "one of the most important meetings in the history of medicine".

== October 14, 1900 (Sunday) ==
- In Chicago, Ban Johnson of baseball's American League announced that the 8-team circuit was going to challenge the established National League. Franchises in Indianapolis and Kansas City, Missouri, were replaced by Baltimore and Washington, D.C., and the Minneapolis team would move into Philadelphia. The AL's other teams were in Boston, Chicago, Cleveland, Detroit and Milwaukee. The Baltimore and Milwaukee teams would soon move into New York City and St. Louis, while the AL began raiding the NL rosters.
- Born: W. Edwards Deming, American engineer, the "Father of Quality Management"; in Sioux City, Iowa (d. 1993)

== October 15, 1900 (Monday) ==
- Questionnaires were sent to every physician in Germany in the first attempt to make a study on the prevalence of cancer.
- Mark Twain returned to the United States after almost ten years living abroad in Europe.
- Symphony Hall, the first building designed by an acoustical engineer (Wallace Clement Sabine), opened in Boston.
- Lieutenant T. L. Fuller of the Frontier Battalion of the Texas Ranger Division was assassinated while washing his face in an Orange, Texas barber shop, possibly in retaliation for his self-defense killing of a gang leader in December 1899. Fuller was the last member of the Frontier Battalion killed in the line of duty before its disbandment in 1901.
- U.S. Marshals arrested Alexander McKenzie, operator of the Alaska Gold Mining Company. McKenzie, a North Dakota politician who had arrived on July 19, had secured the appointment of a federal judge in hopes of having exclusive control of the gold fields, just long enough to make a fortune.
- Born: Mervyn LeRoy, American film director, leading filmmaker for Warner Bros.; in San Francisco (d. 1987)

== October 16, 1900 (Tuesday) ==
- The United Kingdom and Germany signed an agreement in London, providing that they would oppose the partition of China into spheres of influence. The "Yangtze Agreement", signed by Lord Salisbury and Ambassador Count Paul von Hatzfeldt, was an endorsement of the Open Door Policy proposed by the United States for free trade in China.
- Pierre Giffard founded L'Auto-Velo, later referred to simply as L'Auto, the first daily publication devoted exclusively to automobiles and cycling.
- Queen Wilhelmina of the Netherlands announced her engagement to Prince Henry. They were married on February 7, 1901, and Prince Henry served as consort until his death in 1934.
- Born: Edward Ardizzone, English painter, printmaker and author; in Haiphong, French Indochina (d. 1979)

== October 17, 1900 (Wednesday) ==
- Bernhard von Bülow became the fourth Chancellor of the German Empire, after his appointment by Kaiser William. The former Foreign Secretary succeeded Prince Chlodwig Hohenlohe, who resigned because of his age (81) and health. Hohenlohe would die on July 6, 1901.
- The anthracite coal miners strike in Pennsylvania ended after one month, with the companies agreeing to a 10 percent raise for all miners.

== October 18, 1900 (Thursday) ==
- The Wright brothers began their first untethered glider flights at Kitty Hawk, North Carolina, after concluding that restraining the glider with cables had hindered their research on controlled flight. In six days of untethered tests, ending on October 23, Wilbur and Orville perfected control of unpowered flight.
- The Brooklyn Superbas (later the Brooklyn Dodgers) won the only Chronicle-Telegraph Cup, beating the Pittsburgh Pirates 6 to 1 to win Game Four of the best-of-five series. Brooklyn had clinched the National League pennant, and Pittsburgh finished in second place. The Pittsburgh Chronicle Telegraph sponsored the post-season series. All of the games were played in Exposition Park in Pittsburgh.

== October 19, 1900 (Friday) ==
- Max Planck presented, to the German Physical Society in Berlin, what is now called Planck's law of black-body radiation, described as "a discovery that opened the way to the development of the quantum theory and provided the initial formulation for that theory".

== October 20, 1900 (Saturday) ==
- Itō Hirobumi became Prime Minister of Japan for the fourth and final time, taking over from Yamagata Aritomo. Ito, who had been Japan's first Prime Minister from 1885 to 1888, served until May 10, 1901.
- Born: Wayne Morse, American politician, United States Senator from Oregon from 1945 to 1969, one of the first opponents in United States Congress of the Vietnam War; in Madison, Wisconsin (d. 1974)

== October 21, 1900 (Sunday) ==
- Captain George W. Biegler, commanding a force of 19 men, defeated 300 Filipino insurgents in battle at Loac, Luzon, Philippines and was later awarded the Medal of Honor for bravery.

== October 22, 1900 (Monday) ==
- John Sherman, the 35th United States Secretary of State, died in Washington, D.C.
- Edward Stettinius Jr., the 48th United States Secretary of State, was born the same day in Chicago.

== October 23, 1900 (Tuesday) ==
- Cornelius L. Alvord Jr., was revealed to have been the perpetrator of the largest bank robbery, up to that time, in American history. Alvord, a teller at the First National Bank of New York (now part of Citibank) had embezzled more than $700,000 from the bank over a period of six years. By contrast, Butch Cassidy's largest bank robbery, committed the month before, netted less than $33,000. Alvord, one of the great white collar criminals of his day, was arrested six days later in Boston. He served eight years in Sing Sing prison and died on September 10, 1912, in Stockport, New York.

== October 24, 1900 (Wednesday) ==
- After four weeks, voting concluded in the "Khaki Election" in the United Kingdom. The Conservative Party, led by Lord Salisbury, Prime Minister of the United Kingdom, lost nine seats but retained a 60 percent majority in the Parliament of the United Kingdom with 402 seats overall, followed by the Liberal Party, led by Henry Campbell-Bannerman. The new Labour Party won its first two seats. Among the new Conservative Party Members of Parliament was Winston Churchill, who defeated Walter Runciman to become one of the two representatives from Oldham.
- Kaiser Wilhelm became the first head of state to ride on a monorail, in a trial run of the Wuppertal Schwebebahn in Wuppertal, Germany.
- General Redvers Buller departed South Africa.

== October 25, 1900 (Thursday) ==
- The Chosen dynasty renamed the Korean peninsula as the Empire of Korea (Taehan Cheguk), by imperial proclamation.
- The Transvaal Colony was annexed to the United Kingdom.
- Born: Funmilayo Ransome-Kuti, Nigerian suffragist and women's rights activist; in Abeokuta (d. 1978 from injuries sustained in 1977 assault by government soldiers)

== October 26, 1900 (Friday) ==
- Two months after fleeing from Beijing to Xian, Empress Dowager Cixi re-established the Imperial Court to rule China.

== October 27, 1900 (Saturday) ==
- Jimmy Governor, Australian mass murderer, was captured after a three-month manhunt. His brother and partner in crime, Joe Governor, was killed while trying to elude capture on October 31. Jimmy, who had murdered nine people (including four children), was hanged in 1901.
- The vaudeville team of Joe and Myra Keaton was appearing at a matinee show at the Wonderland Theater in Wilmington, Delaware, when they decided to bring their five-year-old son on stage. Joseph Frank Keaton, nicknamed "Buster", was instructed to simply sit at the side and stare at his parents, and the theater manager, William Dockstader, told the parents that the child had been a distraction to the act. Days later, however, Dockstader allowed the child to appear in the Keaton family show because there would be children in the audience. This time, Joe made Buster Keaton part of continuing comedy sketches about a mischievous child and an exasperated father, and the child began a career of making theater (and, later, film) audiences laugh.

== October 28, 1900 (Sunday) ==
- Queen Victoria issued the Letters Patent to create the Office of Governor-General of Australia as well as Instructions to our Governor-General.
- The final event of the 1900 Summer Olympics in Paris took place. In the gold medal game of the Olympic rugby competition, France beat the United Kingdom 27–8.
- Venezuela was struck by its largest ever recorded earthquake, causing serious damage and deaths in the region.

== October 29, 1900 (Monday) ==
- An explosion at the Tarrant & Company pharmaceutical warehouse killed 38 people and injured more than 200, and destroyed two city blocks in New York City. At about 12:45 pm, thirty minutes after a fire began on the upper floors, a blast leveled the seven-story building at 275 Washington Street, and destroyed eight surrounding stores.

== October 30, 1900 (Tuesday) ==
- William Rush Merriam released the results of the 1900 United States census and found the total population of the United States was 76,295,220. There were 74,627,907 in the forty-five states, and another 1,667,313 in the Territories, the District of Columbia, and stationed overseas. An additional 134,158 American Indians were not included in the total. Mr. Merriam added, "The figures of the population are the result of a careful computation by means of the latest tabulating machines.
- Born: Ragnar Granit, Finnish neuroscientist, recipient of the 1967 Nobel Prize in Physiology or Medicine; in Vantaa (d. 1991)

== October 31, 1900 (Wednesday) ==
- The United Presbyterian Church of Scotland and the Free Church of Scotland combined to form the United Free Church of Scotland.
