= Ian Rawcliffe =

Former president of the German Rugby Federation

- Born: 19 December 1948 (age 76); Burnley, England
- Occupation: Business consultant
- Known for: President of the German Rugby Federation (1996–2004 & 2013–2015)

Ian Rawcliffe is a former president of the German Rugby Federation. He held this position from 1996 to 2004 and, again, from 2013 to 2015.

Rawcliffe was born on 19 December 1948 in Burnley, England, and came to Germany with the British Army in the 1970s. Since 1975 he has lived in Rödermark, near Frankfurt and is a member of BSC Offenbach, a club he also coached in the 1980s.

Rawcliffe first held the position of president of the German Rugby Federation from 1996 to 2004, when he stepped down for personal reasons and was succeeded by Bernd Leifheit. He became president for a second time in 2013, succeeding Ralph Götz and stepped down in July 2015 and was replaced by Klaus Blank.
