= German Rugby Federation =

Governing body for rugby union in Germany

Deutscher Rugby-Verband
- Sport: Rugby union
- Founded: 1900; 126 years ago
- World Rugby affiliation: 1988
- Rugby Europe affiliation: 1934
- President: Harald Hees
- Men's coach: Mark Kuhlmann
- Women's coach: Dirk Frase & Paul McGuigan
- Website: www.rugby-verband.de

The German Rugby Federation (German: Deutscher Rugby-Verband or DRV) is the governing body for rugby union in Germany. It organizes the German national team and the three league divisions: the Rugby-Bundesliga, the 2nd Rugby-Bundesliga and the Rugby-Regionalliga. It was founded on 4 November 1900 in Kassel, and is the oldest national rugby union in continental Europe. After the Second World War, the DRV was restored on 14 May 1950.

The DRV publishes the Deutsches Rugby-Journal with 11 issues per year. It is the official organ of the federation.

== History ==
Prior to its foundation several initiatives were taken to syndicate the German clubs. When the efforts of the north German clubs failed in 1886, DFV Hannover 1878 joined the "German Football and Cricket federation", while the southern clubs opted for the "South German Football Union". Despite the well pronounced individualism of the clubs, representatives from Heidelberg and from FV Stuttgart 93, the later VfB Stuttgart, met in February 1898 for the first Rugby-Day (German: Rugby-Tag) in Frankfurt. Led by Professor Dr. Edward Hill Ulrich this group went on looking for closer contact to the north German clubs. Additional Rugby-Days followed in August 1898 and September 1899. It was not until the fifth of this gatherings, taking place in Hannover on 4 November 1900, that 19 clubs formally decided on a joint operation to form a German Rugby Football Union under the governing body of the German Football Association. On 4 November 1901, only one year after the foundation the Rugby-Football Federation made the decision to leave the association football players and form the self-governed German Rugby Federation.

=== Centenary and Barbarians Tour ===
In 2000 the German Rugby Federation celebrated its centenary. Centenary celebrations included a banquet in the Heidelberg Castle and the hosting of the European leg of the Rugby World Cup Sevens in Heidelberg, in which the German team came close to upsetting Ireland, who had Gordon D'Arcy in their line-up. The tournament was won by the Welsh team, which featured Andy Marinos and Arwel Thomas.

The highlight of the Centenary season was the Centenary Match against the Barbarians. The Barbarians included a host of internationals including Scott Hastings, Peter Stringer, Shaun Longstaff, Jeff Probyn, Frankie Sheahan, Russell Earnshaw, Shaun Connor, John Langford and Derwyn Jones and won 47–19 against a determined German team.

=== Proposed reform 2009 ===
The DRV proposed a reform of its structure in October 2009, with the view of rugby having become an Olympic sport once more.

Also, from 2010–11, every club has to field a minimum of ten players per game who are eligible to play for the German national team, and can only field twelve non-eligible players at the same game.

For the national teams, the aim was set to have the men's side achieve qualification for the 2019 Rugby World Cup, at the latest, and qualification for both the men and women for the 2016 Summer Olympics.

=== Financial Crisis ===
The German Rugby Federation suffered a major crisis in 2011, finding itself close to insolvency, being €200,000 in debt. The situation was brought on by the annual grant of the Federal Ministry of the Interior, BMI, not being paid in 2010 after the ministry voiced concerns that the DRV was not using the money for the desired purpose, to support the sport. A legal battle that the DRV chairman Claus-Peter Bach fought with the ministry did not bring the desired result but instead worsened the situation. Bach consequently announced he would not stand for another term in July 2011 and was replaced by Ralph Götz. The DRV was able to secure a private loan to survive and hopes to attract sponsors that had withdrawn under Bach as well as to reach a settlement with the BMI.

At the Deutsche Rugby Tag (DRT) in mid-July 2012, the DRV announced that it was able to avoid insolvency and regain its annual grants from the German government on the condition that it sticks to a strict financial plan that would see the DRV debt free by 2018. Any violation of this plan would see the funding withdrawn and the association confronted with insolvency again.

== Structure ==
The DRV is located and registered as a non-profit organisation in Hannover and combines the 13 regional unions (Landesverbände) with 11,656 members total of which 10,023 are male and 1,633 are female players. The 108 registered clubs have 319 referees (as of January 2011). The DRV has three sub-organisations these are the German Rugby Youth (German: Deutsche Rugby-Jugend or DRJ) since 1967, the Referees Association (German: Schiedrichtervereinigung or SDRV) since 1996 and the German Women's Rugby Association (German: Deutsche Rugby-Frauen or DRF) since 2003. As an outcome of the Rugby-Tag in July 2010 the integration of Touch Rugby was scheduled for January 2011.

== Membership ==
The DRV is a foundation member of Rugby Europe (1934), and became affiliated to the International Rugby Football Board, now known as World Rugby, in 1988. Moreover, it is a founding member of the German Olympic Sport Federation Deutscher Olympischer Sportbund.

== President ==
Since the formation of the association in 1900, its presidents were:

| Name | Years | Club |
| Ferdinand-Wilhelm Fricke | 1900–01 | DFV 1878 Hannover |
| Edward Hill Ullrich | 1902–03 | Heidelberger RK |
| Ferdinand-Wilhelm Fricke | 1904–05 | DFV 1878 Hannover |
| Edward Hill Ullrich | 1906–07 | Heidelberger RK |
| Hermann Behlert | 1908–09 | SC Elite Hannover |
| Robert Müller | 1909–13 | SC Merkur Hannover |
| Ottomar Baron von Reden-Pattensen | 1913–20 | DFV 1878 Hannover |
| Albert Wolters | 1920–23 | DFV 1878 Hannover |
| Paul Simon | 1923–24 | TV 1860 Frankfurt |
| Theodor Freud | 1924–25 | Preußen Berlin |
| Fritz Müller | 1925–27 | SC 1880 Frankfurt |
| Ottomar Baron von Reden-Pattensen | 1927–31 | DSV 78 Hannover |
| Hermann Meister | 1931–47 | RG Heidelberg |
| Paul Schrader | 1947–49 | SV Odin Hannover |
| Willi Abel | 1949–51 | FV 1897 Linden |
| Fritz Bösche | 1951–56 | TSV Victoria Linden |
| Heinz Reinhold | 1956–74 | SV 1908 Ricklingen |
| Hans Baumgärtner | 1974–85 | SC Neuenheim |
| Willi Eckert | 1985–91 | NTV 09 Hannover |
| Theodor Frucht | 1991–96 | TSV Victoria Linden |
| Ian Rawcliffe | 1996–2004 | BSC Offenbach |
| Bernd Leifheit | 2004–05 | SV 1908 Ricklingen |
| Claus-Peter Bach | 2005–11 | SC Neuenheim |
| Ralph Götz | 2011–13 | SC Neuenheim |
| Ian Rawcliffe | 2013–15 | BSC Offenbach |
| Klaus Blank | 2015–18 | SC Neuenheim |
| Robin J. Stalker | 2018–19 | no club affiliation |
| Harald Hees | 2019– | RK Heusenstamm |

Source: "Präsidenten des Deutschen Rugby-Verbandes" (in German). Deutscher Rugby Verband. Archived from the original on 25 October 2007.

== Sources ==
- Brockhaus Enzyklopädie (1973 edition), vol 16 ISBN 978-3-7653-0000-4)
