= List of shipwrecks in 1900 =

The list of shipwrecks in 1900 includes ships sunk, foundered, grounded, or otherwise lost during 1900.

table of contents
1900
| Jan | Feb | Mar | Apr |
| May | Jun | Jul | Aug |
| Sep | Oct | Nov | Dec |
Unknown date

== January ==
=== 1 January ===
List of shipwrecks: 1 January 1900
| Ship | State | Description |
|---|---|---|
| W. F. Nisbet | United States | The steamer was sunk by ice near Wellsburg, Kentucky. |

=== 2 January ===
List of shipwrecks: 2 January 1900
| Ship | State | Description |
|---|---|---|
| Rover's Bride | United States | The schooner stranded and sank off Quaker Head one mile (1.6 km) north of the Cross Island, Maine Life Saving Station. Her cargo and various items salvaged. Her crew were rescued by the United States Life-Saving Service. A failed attempt to refloat occurred on 26 January after which she was abandoned. |

=== 3 January ===
List of shipwrecks: 3 January 1900
| Ship | State | Description |
|---|---|---|
| Resolute | United States Army | The tugboat was sunk in a collision with the tow steamer Swatara (United States) in Boston Harbor, a total loss. Her wreck was removed by 9 January. Her engineer was drowned. |

=== 4 January ===
List of shipwrecks: 4 January 1900
| Ship | State | Description |
|---|---|---|
| Bluestone | United States | The tow steamer sank at dock in Bayonne, New Jersey. Later raised. |
| Pansy | United States | The steamer dragged anchor and went on the rocks at Long Island in Puget Sound. |

=== 5 January ===
List of shipwrecks: 5 January 1900
| Ship | State | Description |
|---|---|---|
| Ibex | United Kingdom | The passenger and mail ship hit the Platte Fougere reef off Guernsey in the Channel Islands in bad visibility and sank with two fatalities. |

=== 6 January ===
List of shipwrecks: 6 January 1900
| Ship | State | Description |
|---|---|---|
| Stella Wilds | United States | The steamer was destroyed by fire at Briers Landing, Mississippi. |

=== 7 January ===
List of shipwrecks: 7 January 1900
| Ship | State | Description |
|---|---|---|
| H. E. Sailman | United States | The steamer was sunk while breaking ice at Middleport, Ohio. Machinery was salvaged. Her hull was raised and converted into a barge. |
| I. W. Durham | United States | The tugboat was caught by running ice on her starboard side causing her to list and sink off Riverton, New Jersey in 40 feet (12 m) of water. |

=== 8 January ===
List of shipwrecks: 8 January 1900
| Ship | State | Description |
|---|---|---|
| Mascot | United States | The steamer struck a snag, filled and sank at Lewis Landing, Oregon and sank in the Lewis River. Later raised. |

=== 16 January ===
List of shipwrecks: 16 January 1900
| Ship | State | Description |
|---|---|---|
| Townsend | United States | During a voyage in Southeast Alaska from Skagway to Haines Mission with eight passengers, a crew of 20, and no cargo aboard, the 450-gross register ton, 125-foot (38 m) steamer was wrecked on rocks in Lynn Canal halfway between Haines Mission and Battery Point after her engine failed during a gale in 22 fathoms (132 ft; 40 m) of water. All on board reached shore safely in the ship's boats. |

=== 18 January ===
List of shipwrecks: 18 January 1900
| Ship | State | Description |
|---|---|---|
| Atlanta | United States | The steamer sprang a leak and sank at Greenwood, Mississippi. Her boiler and machinery were salvaged. |
| Nellie J. Crocker | United States | The schooner stranded on Schoodic Island ten miles (16 km) east north east of the Cranberry Islands, Maine Life Saving Station, a total loss. Her crew made it to shore in her boat. |

=== 20 January ===
List of shipwrecks: 20 January 1900
| Ship | State | Description |
|---|---|---|
| Hero | United States | The steamer sank in a collision with the barge Jerry in the Mobile River. One crewman killed. |

=== 23 January ===
List of shipwrecks: 23 January 1900
| Ship | State | Description |
|---|---|---|
| Ardandhu | United Kingdom | Carrying a cargo of baled hay, the 1,334-ton Munson Line cargo ship was damaged in a collision in fog with the steamer Herman Winter (United States) in Vineyard Sound off the coast of Massachusetts. Her second mate and engineer were killed. She drifted onto the southwest end of Naushon Island and settled on the bottom with her bow ashore and her stern submerged. By the next day, she had slid off the shore and sunk in 60 feet (18 m) of water at 41°26′30″N 070°48′00″W. The wreck was blown up as a hazard to navigation during October and November. |
| Rock City | United States | The steamer struck a snag in the St. Francis River and sank. |

=== 25 January ===
List of shipwrecks: 25 January 1900
| Ship | State | Description |
|---|---|---|
| Lorna Doone | United States | The steamer struck a snag, or log, in the St. Francis River five miles (8.0 km) below Madison, Arkansas and sank. Raised and repaired. |
| Miami | United States | The steamer stranded on a submerged rock in Stewart Channel, British Columbia, a total loss. |

=== 26 January ===
List of shipwrecks: 26 January 1900
| Ship | State | Description |
|---|---|---|
| E. Beek | United States | The barge, under tow of Manicipal (United States), was sunk in a collision with Alfred W. Booth (United States) off Governor's Island. |

=== 27 January ===
List of shipwrecks: 27 January 1900
| Ship | State | Description |
|---|---|---|
| Charles F. Atwood | United States | The schooner foundered off Thatcher's Island three miles (4.8 km) south of the Gap Cove, Massachusetts Life Saving Station, a total loss. Her crew made it to shore. |
| Remus | United States | The steamer bound from Philadelphia to Aarhuus was driven onto rocks off the Danish coast in a heavy gale. 13 sailors died, including the captain, Captain Williams, who shot himself. 14 were rescued, all suffering from frostbite. |

=== 28 January ===
List of shipwrecks: 28 January 1900
| Ship | State | Description |
|---|---|---|
| E. P. Ferry | United States | The tow steamer burned at Duluth, Minnesota. |

=== 29 January ===
List of shipwrecks: 29 January 1900
| Ship | State | Description |
|---|---|---|
| Peter J. Clark | United States | The steamer was lying at the bank for repairs at Caruthersville, Missouri when she burned, a total loss. |

=== 31 January ===
List of shipwrecks: 31 January 1900
| Ship | State | Description |
|---|---|---|
| Wolcott | United States | During a voyage from Unga to Sitka, District of Alaska, with seven passengers, a crew of 17, and 50 pounds (23 kg) of gold bullion aboard, the 247-ton, 131.5-foot (40.1 m) steam schooner struck a submerged reef – thereafter known as Wolcott Reef (57°40′15″N 154°11′45″W) – and was beached at Rocky Point (57.6622222°N 154.2322222°W) on Kodiak Island, seven nautical miles (13 km; 8.1 mi) west-southwest of Uyak Bay (57.8000°N 154.0667°W), to prevent her from sinking. All on board reached safety and the gold bullion was salvaged, but Wolcott became a total loss. |

=== Unknown date ===
List of shipwrecks: Unknown date January 1900
| Ship | State | Description |
|---|---|---|
| Jessie | United States | With no one on board, the 38-gross register ton schooner was stranded at Nome, District of Alaska. |
| Lady Elizabeth | United Kingdom | Carrying barrels of naphtha and petrol, the ship burned at the Cattewater in Plymouth, United Kingdom. |
| W. K. Merwin | United States | The steamer was blown ashore and wrecked near Nome, Alaska near the mouth of the Snake River, or in Norton Sound near the mouth of the Yukon River on 10 August 1900, or 28 July 1900 or sometime in December 1899/January 1900. |

== February ==
=== 3 February ===
List of shipwrecks: 3 February 1900
| Ship | State | Description |
|---|---|---|
| Mischief | United States | The tug careened, filled with water, and sank while trying to pull Petrolia (United States) off rocks near Hell Gate in the East River. Raised a few days later. |
| Petrolia | United States | The tug went aground on rocks near Hell Gate in the East River. |

=== 4 February ===
List of shipwrecks: 4 February 1900
| Ship | State | Description |
|---|---|---|
| Mascotte | United States | The steamer struck a stump and sank in the Flint River above Horseshoe. |

=== 5 February ===
List of shipwrecks: 5 February 1900
| Ship | State | Description |
|---|---|---|
| Berwick | United States | The schooner, under tow of Maggie (United States), ran aground when Maggie ran aground at the mouth of the Siuslaw River 21 miles (34 km) north north west of the Umpqua River Life Saving Station. Refloated on 14 February. |
| John Wilson, Sr. | United States | The barge, under tow of E. Luckenbach (United States) on a trip from Whitestone, Rhode Island to Bridgeport, Connecticut and New Haven, Connecticut sank in a gale while seeking shelter in Lloyd's Harbor, Long Island. Her captain and his wife died. |
| Maggie | United States | The steamer ran aground at the mouth of the Siuslaw River 21 miles (34 km) north north west of the Umpqua River Life Saving Station. Refloated on 1 March and towed up river to Florence, Oregon where she was beached for repairs. |
| Mary Treyom | United States | The barge, under tow of E. Luckenbach (United States) on a trip from Whitestone, Rhode Island to Bridgeport, Connecticut and New Haven, Connecticut sank in a gale while seeking shelter in Lloyd's Harbor, Long Island. |

=== 6 February ===
List of shipwrecks: 6 February 1900
| Ship | State | Description |
|---|---|---|
| Nettie Low | United States | The motor schooner capsized in a squall near Double Point, California. She drifted ashore near Bolinas Point, a total loss. Her crew left in her lifeboat. |

=== 7 February ===
List of shipwrecks: 7 February 1900
| Ship | State | Description |
|---|---|---|
| Ardanbhan | United Kingdom | The steamer was wrecked on rocks one-half mile (0.80 km) south of Souter Point in a gale with hail and snow. |

=== 8 February ===
List of shipwrecks: 8 February 1900
| Ship | State | Description |
|---|---|---|
| Gate City | United States | During a voyage from Savannah, Georgia, to Boston, Massachusetts, the steam cargo ship was stranded in dense fog on a bar off the south coast of Long Island one mile (1.6 km) west of the United States Life-Saving Service station at Moriches, New York. She washed over the bar the next morning and stuck 200 yards (180 m) offshore. She was abandoned on 13 February as a total loss and sank in 20 to 25 feet (6 to 8 m) of water, although part of her cargo was salvaged. The United States Life-Saving Service rescued the 46 men and three women on board. |

=== 9 February ===
List of shipwrecks: 9 February 1900
| Ship | State | Description |
|---|---|---|
| Three Friends | United States | The schooner stranded on Royal Shoal eight miles (13 km) north north west of the Portsmouth, North Carolina Life Saving Station. Stripped and abandoned on 20 February as a total loss. Crew rescued by the United States Life-Saving Service. |

=== 10 February ===
List of shipwrecks: 10 February 1900
| Ship | State | Description |
|---|---|---|
| Gov. Frances T. Nicholls | United States | The steamer burned at Gretna, Louisiana, a total loss. |

=== 12 February ===
List of shipwrecks: 12 February 1900
| Ship | State | Description |
|---|---|---|
| Henry M. Stanley | United States | The steamer was damaged in the Ohio River after striking the pier of the Cincinnati Southern Railroad bridge. She was beached, sinking in shallow water. One crewman killed. Raised and repaired. |
| James G. Blaine | United States | The steamer struck an obstruction in the Monongahela River near California, Pennsylvania and sank. Later raised. |

=== 16 February ===
List of shipwrecks: 16 February 1900
| Ship | State | Description |
|---|---|---|
| Cashier | Belgium | The schooner sank off Green Scar, St Brides Bay. |
| Ivanhoe | United States | The tug sprung a leak and sank at Pier 29 South, Philadelphia. |

=== 17 February ===
List of shipwrecks: 17 February 1900
| Ship | State | Description |
|---|---|---|
| New Mattie | United States | The steamer struck a snag, or the bank, in the White River at Wild Goose Bayou and sank. Two crewmen killed. |

=== 19 February ===
List of shipwrecks: 19 February 1900
| Ship | State | Description |
|---|---|---|
| Ellen McAvoy | United States | The steamer burned to the water's edge at Camden, New Jersey overnight. |
| Talus | United Kingdom | The sailing ship rolled on her beam ends on 15 February in a gale with sleet after leaving Leith earlier. On 16 February her crew were taken off by Friedensburg (flag unknown) and she was taken under tow by Ferrara (flag unknown). On 19 February the tow was abandoned about four miles (6.4 km) off Dunbar, Scotland, she drifted ashore and was wrecked. |

=== 20 February ===
List of shipwrecks: 20 February 1900
| Ship | State | Description |
|---|---|---|
| Tom Brown | United States | The tow steamer was sunk in 22 feet (6.7 m) of water by ice, one mile (1.6 km) from the harbor, off 12th street, Chicago, Illinois in Lake Michigan. |

=== 23 February ===
List of shipwrecks: 23 February 1900
| Ship | State | Description |
|---|---|---|
| John L. Lowry | United States | The steamer was destroyed by fire at Paducah, Kentucky. |
| Sammie | United States | The tug sprung a leak and sank in four fathoms (24 ft; 7.3 m) of water in Princess Bay, Staten Island. Raised and rebuilt. |

=== 24 February ===
List of shipwrecks: 24 February 1900
| Ship | State | Description |
|---|---|---|
| General Whiley | United States | The barge, under tow of James Hughes (United States), sank in a gale off Whale Rock in Narragansett Bay. Her captain and his four children died. |

=== 25 February ===
List of shipwrecks: 25 February 1900
| Ship | State | Description |
|---|---|---|
| Ethiopia | United Kingdom | The steamship ran aground at Oxwich Point, Glamorgan. She was refloated several days later. |

=== 26 February ===
List of shipwrecks: 26 February 1900
| Ship | State | Description |
|---|---|---|
| Broomhill | United Kingdom | The steamship ran aground near St. Margaret's Bay, Kent. She was refloated with assistance and taken in to Dover, Kent. |
| Sapphire | United Kingdom | the steam trawler ran aground at Ryhope, County Durham. She was refloated with the assistance of tugs and put in to the River Tyne. |

=== 27 February ===
List of shipwrecks: 27 February 1900
| Ship | State | Description |
|---|---|---|
| Troubadour | United States | The steamer, while under tow, was struck by high winds, capsized and sank in the Mississippi River. |

=== 28 February ===
List of shipwrecks: 28 February 1900
| Ship | State | Description |
|---|---|---|
| George M. Waters | United States | The steamer was swamped in a storm at Arkansas City, Arkansas and sank. Raised and repaired. |
| Gordon Rowe | United States | The steamer sank overnight at dock in Warren, Rhode Island when the watchman fell asleep while filling a water tank and it overflowed. Raised on 5 March. |

=== Unknown date ===
List of shipwrecks: unknown date in February 1900
| Ship | State | Description |
|---|---|---|
| British Empire | United Kingdom | The ship ran aground on the Speeton Rock, Yorkshire. |
| Drever | United Kingdom | The steamship was driven ashore at Flamborough Head, Yorkshire. |
| Ethiopia | United Kingdom | The steamship was driven ashore at Oxwich Point, Glamorgan. She was refloated on 27 February, but had to be beached as she was leaking severely. |
| Glenartny | United Kingdom | The steamship ran aground on the Blenheim Shoal. She was on a voyage from London to Nagasaki, Japan. |
| Hilda | Norway | the barque was abandoned in the North Sea with the loss of a crew member. She was on a voyage from Burntisland, Fife, United Kingdom to Stavanger. |
| Kant | Germany | The steamship was driven ashore at Zeynowa Hela. |
| Moel Eilian | United Kingdom | The barque ran aground at Westport, County Mayo. She was later refloated. |
| Osterjoen | Norway | The galiot was abandoned in the North Sea in a sinking condition. Her crew were rescued. She was on a voyage from East Wemyss, Fife, United Kingdom to Stavanger. |
| Perseverance | United Kingdom | The sailing ship departed Probolinggo, Java, Netherlands East Indies, for Newcastle, New South Wales and vanished. Lost with all 26 crew. |
| Torino | United Kingdom | The steamer left Pensacola, Florida for Havana, Cuba on 20 February and was never seen again. Believed sunk during a storm on the night of 20 February south of Pensacola in the Gulf of Mexico. |
| Valhalla | Norway | The barque was driven ashore and wrecked at Tantallon Castle, Lothian, United Kingdom. Her ten crew were rescued. |

== March ==
=== 1 March ===
List of shipwrecks: 1 March 1900
| Ship | State | Description |
|---|---|---|
| Eillen | United States | The steamer's well overflowed sinking her at Island No. 34 in the Mississippi River. Raised and repaired. |

=== 5 March ===
List of shipwrecks: 5 March 1900
| Ship | State | Description |
|---|---|---|
| Hermann Köppen | Germany | The steamer ran aground on the rocks at Barsier, west of Alderney in the Channel Islands, and was wrecked. |

=== 6 March ===
List of shipwrecks: 6 March 1900
| Ship | State | Description |
|---|---|---|
| E. A. Pharr | United States | The steamer struck a snag and sank in the Coldwater River near Riverside Landing, Mississippi. |
| Cornell | United States | The steamer was sunk in a collision with Eaglet (United States) at Pier 46 in the North River. Raised the next day. |

=== 8 March ===
List of shipwrecks: 8 March 1900
| Ship | State | Description |
|---|---|---|
| Albatross | United States | The steamer struck a snag, or log, and sank at Richardson's Landing, Tennessee. |

=== 9 March ===
List of shipwrecks: 9 March 1900
| Ship | State | Description |
|---|---|---|
| Chibine | United Kingdom | The steamer was wrecked on the Sherateeb Shoal in the Gulf of Suez, 30 nautical miles (56 km; 35 mi) north-west of El Tor, Egypt. |
| Delaware | United States | The steamer was destroyed by fire at Milford, Delaware overnight. |

=== 10 March ===
List of shipwrecks: 10 March 1900
| Ship | State | Description |
|---|---|---|
| Maud Alma | United States | The steamer struck a stump and sank in the Oskowsksnee River three and a half miles (5.6 km) above Blaze Point, a total loss. |

=== 12 March ===
List of shipwrecks: 12 March 1900
| Ship | State | Description |
|---|---|---|
| Lizzie S. Sorenson | United States | The 83-ton, 84.2-foot (25.7 m) schooner was stranded on the reef at Killisnoo in Southeast Alaska. She was refloated, repaired, and returned to service. |

=== 14 March ===
List of shipwrecks: 14 March 1900
| Ship | State | Description |
|---|---|---|
| Henry No. 2 | United States | The steamer was holed by an obstruction while lying at Webster, Pennsylvania in the Monongahela River and sank. Later raised and repaired. |

=== 16 March ===
List of shipwrecks: 16 March 1900
| Ship | State | Description |
|---|---|---|
| Ugie | United Kingdom | The steamer sank following a collision with another ship. |

=== 19 March ===
List of shipwrecks: 19 March 1900
| Ship | State | Description |
|---|---|---|
| Delta | United States | The tow steamer sank at dock in Cleveland, Ohio when the main supply pipe froze and burst. |

=== 21 March ===
List of shipwrecks: 21 March 1900
| Ship | State | Description |
|---|---|---|
| Edith | United States | The laid up steamer was sunk by high winds opposite Clarksville, Missouri. Later raised. |
| William J. Sewell | United States | The tug was sunk when the ferry Delaware (United States) snagged her tow line to two dump barges causing one of them to lunge forward into the tug at the foot of Chambers Street in the North River. |

=== 22 March ===
List of shipwrecks: 22 March 1900
| Ship | State | Description |
|---|---|---|
| Richmond | United States | The lighter filled and sank at dock at Pier 6 in the North River. Raised and drydocked. |

=== 23 March ===
List of shipwrecks: 23 March 1900
| Ship | State | Description |
|---|---|---|
| Al-Ki | United States | The steamer struck an iceberg in Dundas Bay damaging her stern and bow. She was beached where temporary repairs were made. |
| R. C. Gunter | United States | The steamer was blown off course by high winds while making a landing at Wetzel Landing in the Illinois River, causing her to strike an obstruction and sink. Later raised. |

=== 25 March ===
List of shipwrecks: 25 March 1900
| Ship | State | Description |
|---|---|---|
| Alfarratta | United States | The pleasure steamer struck a sunken log and sank 300 feet (91 m) off Catskill Point, New York. |

=== 26 March ===
List of shipwrecks: 26 March 1900
| Ship | State | Description |
|---|---|---|
| Rambler | United States | The laid up steamer was stuck to frozen mud on the bottom when a sudden rise in river height flooded her at Quiver Lake, above Havana, Illinois. |

=== 27 March ===
List of shipwrecks: 27 March 1900
| Ship | State | Description |
|---|---|---|
| Edna Goodill | United States | The fishing steamer sprung a leak and sank on Lake Erie off Vermilion, Ohio. |
| Wave | United States | The steamer was destroyed by fire at dock in Mount Hope Bay, Rhode Island. |

=== Unknown date ===
List of shipwrecks: Unknown date 1900
| Ship | State | Description |
|---|---|---|
| Concord | United Kingdom | The ship sank on the Triggs, just outside her home port, Porthleven, Cornwall, United Kingdom. |

== April ==
=== 1 April ===
List of shipwrecks: 1 April 1900
| Ship | State | Description |
|---|---|---|
| Abraham Richardson | United States | The schooner was sunk in a collision with a barge under the tow of Swatara (United States) in Vineyard Sound off East Chop in 57 feet (17 m) of water. She had suffered a steering failure causing the collision. |

=== 2 April ===
List of shipwrecks: 2 April 1900
| Ship | State | Description |
|---|---|---|
| Cleon | United States | The steamer was destroyed by fire at Rockdale, Louisiana due to a defective flue in the galley. |

=== 3 April ===
List of shipwrecks: 3 April 1900
| Ship | State | Description |
|---|---|---|
| Two Brothers | United States | The steamer heeled over and sank while making a turn to port. Later raised. |

=== 4 April ===
List of shipwrecks: 4 April 1900
| Ship | State | Description |
|---|---|---|
| T. J. Wood | United States | The steamer struck Hooker's Dyke at Brown's Island in the Ohio River and sank. Raised and repaired. |

=== 6 April ===
List of shipwrecks: 6 April 1900
| Ship | State | Description |
|---|---|---|
| Xantho | United States | The steamer was wrecked in a gale at Port Lavaca, Texas. |

=== 7 April ===
List of shipwrecks: 7 April 1900
| Ship | State | Description |
|---|---|---|
| Lexington | United States | The steamer sprung a leak and sank in five feet (1.5 m) of water in the Great Kanawha River. Raised and repaired. |

=== 10 April ===
List of shipwrecks: 01 April 1900
| Ship | State | Description |
|---|---|---|
| Little Verne | United States | The passenger barge was destroyed by fire at Rock Island, Illinois, (probably as a result of a fire on Volunteer (United States)). |
| Mascot | United States | The steamer was destroyed by fire at Rock Island, Illinois as a result of a fire on Volunteer (United States). |
| Saturn | United States | The steamer was destroyed by fire at Rock Island, Illinois as a result of a fire on Volunteer (United States). |
| Volunteer | United States | The laid up steamer was destroyed by fire at Rock Island, Illinois. |

=== 11 April ===
List of shipwrecks: 11 April 1900
| Ship | State | Description |
|---|---|---|
| Hudson | United States | The steamer caught fire off Verplanck's Point. She was beached and was destroyed by the fire. |
| Laguna | United States | The freighter stranded on the bar of the Tillamook River, a total loss. |
| Peace and Plenty | United Kingdom | After dragging her anchor in a gale, the ketch from Lowestoft ran aground on Greenaway rocks near Trebetherick, on the River Camel estuary in Cornwall. Five of the eight crew were rescued by Rocket Brigade. The incident saw the loss of both Padstow lifeboats, along with eight lifeboat crew. |
| Arab | United Kingdom | The RNLI Padstow No. 1 lifeboat (ON 51) was wrecked whilst on service to the ketch Peace and Plenty. |
| James Stevens No. 4 | United Kingdom | The RNLI Padstow No. 2 Steam-class lifeboat (ON 412) was wrecked whilst on service to the ketch Peace and Plenty, with the loss of eight crew. |

=== 15 April ===
List of shipwrecks: 15 April 1900
| Ship | State | Description |
|---|---|---|
| Dora B | United States | While under tow by the steamer Excelsior (United States), the small schooner's towline parted at the entrance to Lituya Bay on the coast of Southeast Alaska, and she and her crew of five were never heard from again. One body and wreckage from Dora B later were found off Yakutat, District of Alaska. |

=== 16 April ===
List of shipwrecks: 16 April 1900
| Ship | State | Description |
|---|---|---|
| M. B. Shaw | United States | The steamer sprung a leak and sank in the Wolf River at Memphis, Tennessee. Raised and repaired. |

=== 20 April ===
List of shipwrecks: 20 April 1900
| Ship | State | Description |
|---|---|---|
| Harvey W. Temple | United States | The tow steamer collided with the ferry Harvey W. Temple (United States) causing her to careen, fill and sink off the foot of Fourteenth Street in the East River. Later raised. |
| Rose Standish | United States | The steamer, out of commission and being repaired, was destroyed by fire at dock in Calais, Maine. |

=== 29 April ===
List of shipwrecks: 29 April 1900
| Ship | State | Description |
|---|---|---|
| Crown Prince | United States | The fishing steamer sprung a leak and sank in the Cuyahoga River. |
| Excelsior | United States | The steamer struck an iceberg in Gastineau Channel near Juneau, Alaska damaging her hull. She was beached where temporary repairs were made. |

=== Unknown date ===
List of shipwrecks: unknown April 1900
| Ship | State | Description |
|---|---|---|
| Heathbank | United Kingdom | The sailing ship departed Rio de Janeiro for Newcastle, New South Wales on 28 April and vanished. Lost with all 25 crew. |

== May ==
=== 1 May ===
List of shipwrecks: 1 May 1900
| Ship | State | Description |
|---|---|---|
| Josie Davison | United States | The steamer was destroyed by fire at West Superior, Wisconsin. |

=== 3 May ===
List of shipwrecks: 3 May 1900
| Ship | State | Description |
|---|---|---|
| J. K. Graves | United States | The steamer sank from unknown causes at Walnut Bend Landing, Arkansas. Her cook, a chambermaid (both female) and a fireman were killed. |

=== 4 May ===
List of shipwrecks: 4 May 1900
| Ship | State | Description |
|---|---|---|
| Katie | United States | The steamer sprung a leak and sank at Marietta, Ohio in the Muskingum River. Raised and returned to service. |

=== 5 May ===
List of shipwrecks: 5 May 1900
| Ship | State | Description |
|---|---|---|
| Swallow | Western Australia | The Pearling cutter was lost off Tamala, Western Australia. |

=== 9 May ===
List of shipwrecks: 9 May 1900
| Ship | State | Description |
|---|---|---|
| Dick Clyde | United States | The steamer struck a wing dam at Dover Island in the Cumberland River and sank in ten feet (3.0 m) of water. Raised and repaired. |
| Elenor | United States | The steamer sank in eight feet (2.4 m) of water in the Mobile Ship Channel in Mobile Bay after hitting a dead-head. Later raised. |

=== 17 May ===
List of shipwrecks: 17 May 1900
| Ship | State | Description |
|---|---|---|
| Flora Clark | United States | The laid up steamer was destroyed by fire at South Stillwater, Minnesota. |
| George M. Waters | United States | The steamer struck a piling and sank in the harbor at Arkansas City, Arkansas. Raised and repaired. |

=== 19 May ===
List of shipwrecks: 19 May 1900
| Ship | State | Description |
|---|---|---|
| Pioneer | United States | The tow steamer sprung a leak and sank off Paredon Light, Cuba. |

=== 22 May ===
List of shipwrecks: 22 May 1900
| Ship | State | Description |
|---|---|---|
| Elizabeth Washburn | United States | The brick schooner was sunk in a collision with the ferry Midland (United States) off Weehawken, New Jersey. in the North River. |

=== 28 May ===
List of shipwrecks: 28 May 1900
| Ship | State | Description |
|---|---|---|
| Silver Lake | United States | Sonar image of the wreck of Silver Lake, 10 June 2022. During a voyage from Eagle Harbor, Michigan, to Racine, Wisconsin, with a cargo of maple wood, the 95-foot (29 m), 105.53-gross register ton three-masted scow schooner was cut in two in a collision with the train ferry Pere Marquette (United States) and sank in Lake Michigan 15 nautical miles (28 km; 17 mi) off Manitowoc, Wisconsin, at 43°48.37′N 087°34.66′W with the loss of one life. The wreck lies in the Wisconsin Shipwreck Coast National Marine Sanctuary in 210 feet (64 m) of water, and its foremast rise to 140 feet (43 m) from the surface. |

=== 30 May ===
List of shipwrecks: 30 May 1900
| Ship | State | Description |
|---|---|---|
| Hamlet | Norway | The 117.4-foot (35.8 m) 380-ton brig stranded at Connah’s Quay, England. Re-floated, repaired and returned to service. |

=== Unknown date ===
List of shipwrecks: Unknown date in May 1900
| Ship | State | Description |
|---|---|---|
| Iolani | United States | The full-rigged ship collided with Argus (United Kingdom) and foundered off Astoria, Oregon, United States. |

== June ==
=== 4 June ===
List of shipwrecks: 4 June 1900
| Ship | State | Description |
|---|---|---|
| Bismark | United States | The steamer settled on a snag when the river level dropped. She broke in two and sank at Coquille City, Oregon in the Coquille River, a total loss. Her boiler and machinery were salvaged. |
| Eclipse | United States | During a voyage from Seattle, Washington, to Nome, District of Alaska, with a cargo of 200 tons of lumber and general merchandise, the 221-net register ton, 120-foot (36.6 m) schooner was wrecked on a reef in the Bering Sea at 61°40′N 166°30′W near Cape Romanzof (61.7818°N 166.0372°W) on the western coast of Alaska. Her crew of eight survived, but she was deemed a total loss and was abandoned. |

=== 6 June ===
List of shipwrecks: 6 June 1900
| Ship | State | Description |
|---|---|---|
| Alaska | United States | At the end of a voyage from San Francisco, California, to Nome, District of Alaska, with 41 passengers, a crew of 30, and a 300-ton cargo of coal, lumber, machinery, provisions, and liquors aboard, the 337-ton whaling bark was wrecked without loss of life at Nome during a gale. All on board escaped in lifeboats; the steam launch Islam (United States) towed the boats to the revenue cutter USRC Bear ( United States Revenue Cutter Service), which took the survivors aboard. Among Alaska′s survivors was the sole survivor of the November 1899 wreck of the schooner R. Eacrett (United States), which Alaska had rescued on 1 June. |

=== 7 June ===
List of shipwrecks: 7 June 1900
| Ship | State | Description |
|---|---|---|
| T. P. Leathers | United States | The steamer struck an obstruction and sank in the Mississippi River at Bougere, Louisiana. |

=== 10 June ===
List of shipwrecks: 10 June 1900
| Ship | State | Description |
|---|---|---|
| Comet | United States | The steamer struck a snag and sank in six feet (1.8 m) of water in the Mississippi River in O'Connell Slough near Burlington, Iowa. Later raised and repaired. |

=== 11 June ===
List of shipwrecks: 11 June 1900
| Ship | State | Description |
|---|---|---|
| Frank Burnett | United States | The steamer sprang a leak and sank in the Wolf River at Memphis, Tennessee, a total loss. |
| Gypsy | United States | The steamer was wrecked on an obstruction two miles (3.2 km) below Independence, Oregon in the Willamette River, a total loss. Her boiler, machinery, equipment and cargo were salvaged. She was later burned as a hazard to navigation. |
| Nelly | Canada | On a return voyage from Barbados to St. John's, Newfoundland, she became waterlogged, and was abandoned by Captain Baxter and crew in lat. 42.12. long. 54.12. The crew of the 187-ton ship, owned by S. March & Sons, were taken on board SS Maryland and brought to Philadelphia. Baxter was a replacement for the usual captain, Robert Austin Sheppard, who fell ill prior to departure from Newfoundland on 19 September 1899. The register of Nelly (official number 70481, formerly Nelly Schneider) was closed 21 July 1900. Nelly was famous for setting precedent for maritime law in the sale of minority interest in a ship (The Nelly Schneider, Admiralty, April 4 and 5, 1878, Sir R. Phillimore). |

=== 15 June ===
List of shipwrecks: 15 June 1900
| Ship | State | Description |
|---|---|---|
| Tivyside | United Kingdom | The ship ran aground at Overton, Glamorgan. All thirteen people on board survived. |

=== 16 June ===
List of shipwrecks: 16 June 1900
| Ship | State | Description |
|---|---|---|
| City of Rotterdam | Dublin | The vessel sank between Eddystone and Start point after being run down by a full speed Newbiggin (United Kingdom) of Newcastle. Two fatalities, the survivors picked up and taken to Plymouth. |
| Swallow | Western Australia | The sailing lighter foundered off Fremantle, Western Australia. |

=== 18 June ===
List of shipwrecks: 18 June 1900
| Ship | State | Description |
|---|---|---|
| Alexander Barkley | United States | The tow steamer was sunk in a collision with tow steamer O. L. Halenbeck (United States) off Pier 4 in the East River. Raised and taken to Gokey's Dock. In February 1901 the vessel was rebuilt at Peter Colon's shipyard, Jersey City, New Jersey. |

=== 23 June ===
List of shipwrecks: 23 June 1900
| Ship | State | Description |
|---|---|---|
| Dick Brown | United States | The steamer sprung a leak in the Ohio River and sank in 12 feet (3.7 m) of water near Sedamsville, Ohio, a total loss. One crewman killed. |
| Josie Sivley | United States | The steamer struck an obstruction and sank in the Sunflower River at Choctaw Landing, Mississippi. Later raised. One crewman killed. |
| Leslie D | United States | The 285-ton, 112-foot (34.1 m) barkentine was wrecked on a reef of boulders 0.75 nautical miles (1.4 km; 0.9 mi) off Nunivak Island in the Bering Sea. All 30 people aboard – 20 passengers and a crew of 10 – survived. |
| Wm. W. Ker | United States | The schooner was sunk in a collision with steamer Hamilton (United States) two miles (3.2 km) north east of the Northeast Lightship. |

=== 29 June ===
List of shipwrecks: 29 June 1900
| Ship | State | Description |
|---|---|---|
| Marian Teller | United States | The tug sprang a leak and sank in Lake St. Clair due to a clogged siphon. Three of the crew of five died. |

=== 30 June ===
List of shipwrecks: 30 June 1900
| Ship | State | Description |
|---|---|---|
| Bremen | Germany | 1900 Hoboken Docks Fire: The Norddeutscher Lloyd ocean liner was set on fire at Hoboken, New Jersey, by windspread fire after cotton bales on a wharf caught fire, then ignited turpentine and oil barrels. She broke free of her moorings, ran aground on the Weehawken flats in the Hudson River, and burned. The tug Nettie Tice (United States) rescued about 100 people from the ship. The combined death toll aboard Bremen, Main, and Saale (all Germany) was over 300 lives. Bremen was later refloated, repaired, and returned to service. |
| Kaiser Wilhelm der Grosse | Germany | 1900 Hoboken Docks Fire: The Norddeutscher Lloyd ocean liner was set on fire in several places at Hoboken, New Jersey, by wind-spread fire after cotton bales on a wharf caught fire, then ignited turpentine and oil barrels. She suffered only moderate damage and all aboard got off the ship safely. She was repaired and returned to service. |
| Main | Germany | 1900 Hoboken Docks Fire: The Norddeutscher Lloyd ocean liner was set on fire at Hoboken, New Jersey, by wind-spread fire after cotton bales on a wharf caught fire, then ignited turpentine and oil barrels. She broke free of her moorings, ran aground on the Weehawken flats in the Hudson River, and burned with the loss of 44 crew members. Fifteen crew members survived by taking refuge in an empty coal bunker while the fire raged and were rescued after it was put out. Main was later refloated, repaired, and returned to service. |
| Saale | Germany | Saale 1900 Hoboken Docks Fire: The Norddeutscher Lloyd ocean liner was set on fire at Hoboken, New Jersey, by wind-spread fire after cotton bales on a wharf caught fire, then ignited turpentine and oil barrels. She broke her moorings, drifted into the Hudson River, burned, and sank. The remains of 99 people killed aboard Saale were recovered from her interior later; the combined death toll aboard Saale, Bremen, and Main (all Germany) was over 300 lives. Saale was later refloated, repaired, and returned to service. |

== July ==
=== 1 July ===
List of shipwrecks: 1 July 1900
| Ship | State | Description |
|---|---|---|
| Cascade | United States | The tow steamer was in a collision with tow steamer Peerless (United States) on Lake Erie and had to be beached to prevent sinking due to hull damage inflicted by Peerless's prop. |

=== 6 July ===
List of shipwrecks: 6 July 1900
| Ship | State | Description |
|---|---|---|
| Belle of Suwanee | United States | The steamer sprung a leak and sank in seven feet (2.1 m) of water off Pepperfish Keys, Florida. |
| Venture | United States | The tug struck a rock and sank in the west channel at Coxsackie, New York in the Hudson River. Later raised. |

=== 7 July ===
List of shipwrecks: 7 July 1900
| Ship | State | Description |
|---|---|---|
| Cleveland | United States | The steamer was sunk by an obstruction going through the Thropp Street, Chicago Drawbridge. |
| Hunter | United States | During a voyage from Seattle, Washington, to Nome, District of Alaska, with a crew of 27 and a cargo of 500 tons of lumber and general merchandise on board, the 337-ton, 124-foot (37.8 m) bark was wrecked without loss of life during a gale on a shoal near Cape Romanzof (61.8122222°N 166.0977778°W) on the Bering Sea coast of Alaska. |
| Idler | United States | During a pleasure cruise, the former racing yacht was caught in a squall on Lake Erie about 16 miles (26 km) northwest of Cleveland, Ohio. Her captain delayed taking down all sails, and the yacht went on her beam ends. Open deadlights, an open companionway, and an open skylight allowed water to pour in. She sank within minutes. Six of her seven passengers died, but all crewmembers survived. |

=== 9 July ===
List of shipwrecks: 9 July 1900
| Ship | State | Description |
|---|---|---|
| Lake Palmyra | United States | The steamer was totally consumed by fire in the Mississippi River at Refuge Oil Mill Landing, Mississippi. |

=== 11 July ===
List of shipwrecks: 11 July 1900
| Ship | State | Description |
|---|---|---|
| Emeline | United States | The passenger steamer was sunk when she struck a dock at Newburg, New York. Raised, repaired, and returned to service. |

=== 16 July ===
List of shipwrecks: 16 July 1900
| Ship | State | Description |
|---|---|---|
| Transfer | United States | The steamer sprung a leak and sank at Huntington, West Virginia. Raised, re-hulled, and returned to service as City of Huntington. |

=== 17 July ===
List of shipwrecks: 17 July 1900
| Ship | State | Description |
|---|---|---|
| William H. Gratwick | United States | The tow steamer was capsized when the barge she was towing sheared off course near Tonawanda, New York. Two crewmen killed. |

=== 18 July ===
List of shipwrecks: 18 July 1900
| Ship | State | Description |
|---|---|---|
| Gladis Maberry | United States | The steamer struck an obstruction and sank in the Cache River. Had not been raised as of March 1901. |

=== 21 July ===
List of shipwrecks: 21 July 1900
| Ship | State | Description |
|---|---|---|
| Embleton | United Kingdom | The barque was sunk in a collision with the ocean liner Campania (United Kingdom) 30 miles (48 km) north east of the Tuskar Light in the Irish Channel. |
| John S. Havens (schooner) | United States | The schooner sunk off Powells Point, Currituck County, North Carolina carrying a cargo of watermelons. |

=== 26 July ===
List of shipwrecks: 26 July 1900
| Ship | State | Description |
|---|---|---|
| Minnie | Canada | The 50-ton two-masted schooner was wrecked in a dense fog on a reef off Ugamak Island in the eastern Aleutian Islands. Her entire crew abandoned ship in her lifeboats and was rescued by the steamer Alliance (flag unknown) and the schooner Walter L. Rich (flag unknown). |

=== 27 July ===
List of shipwrecks: 27 July 1900
| Ship | State | Description |
|---|---|---|
| Roberta | United States | The steam yacht burned off West Sister Island in Lake Erie. |

=== 28 July ===
List of shipwrecks: 28 July 1900
| Ship | State | Description |
|---|---|---|
| C. B. Lockwood | United States | The steamer ran aground and sank while trying to avoid a collision with the schooner E. M. Breek (Canada) at Lime Kiln Crossing in the Detroit River. |

=== 29 July ===
List of shipwrecks: 29 July 1900
| Ship | State | Description |
|---|---|---|
| General Pierson | United States | The steamer struck an obstruction and sank in the mouth of the Wolf River at Memphis, Tennessee. Raised and repaired. |
| H. W. Sage | United States | The barge, under tow of Queen of the West (United States), sank in the St. Clair River off Algonac, Michigan in a collision with Chicago (United States). One killed. |

=== 30 July ===
List of shipwrecks: 30 July 1900
| Ship | State | Description |
|---|---|---|
| Gypsy | United States | The steamer struck a rock and sank a few miles below Cililo, Oregon near Rock Creek Rapids in the Columbia River. |
| Philip D. Lefevre | United States | The steamer was destroyed by fire at dock in Jersey City, New Jersey. |
| St. Paul | France | The cargo ship was run aground and wrecked at Bath, England. |
| Templar | United States | The tug was sunk when her boiler exploded at Baltimore, Maryland. Her engineer and pilot were killed. |

=== Unknown date ===
List of shipwrecks: 30 July 1900
| Ship | State | Description |
|---|---|---|
| Limache | United Kingdom | The barque departed Callao, Peru for Tocopilla on 18 July and vanished. Lost with all 17 crew. |
| W. K. Merwin | United States | The steamer was blown ashore and wrecked near Nome, District of Alaska, near the mouth of the Snake River, or in Norton Sound near the mouth of the Yukon River on 10 August 1900 or 28 July 1900 or sometime in December 1899/January 1900. |

== August ==
=== 1 August ===
List of shipwrecks: 1 August 1900
| Ship | State | Description |
|---|---|---|
| J. S. Richards | United States | The schooner was sunk in a collision with John W. Moore (United States) in the Detroit River. Two crew members killed. |

=== 3 August ===
List of shipwrecks: 3 August 1900
| Ship | State | Description |
|---|---|---|
| Fontana | United States | The schooner sank in the St. Clair River off the Fort Gratiot Light in a collision with the schooner Santiago (United States). Wreck blown up as a hazard to navigation, probably in late September. One crewman killed. |
| Leonard J. Busby | United States | The tow steamer was sunk in a collision with tow steamer Phoenix (United States) off Pier 5, Brooklyn. The crew were taken off by Phoenix. |

=== 5 August ===
List of shipwrecks: 5 August 1900
| Ship | State | Description |
|---|---|---|
| Margaret | United States | The steamer was destroyed by fire in the Mississippi River at New Orleans. |

=== 9 August ===
List of shipwrecks: 9 August 1900
| Ship | State | Description |
|---|---|---|
| Myrtie M. Ross | United States | The steamer sank at dock at Windsor, Ontario after being damaged by pilings. Raised, repaired and returned to service. |

=== 10 August ===
List of shipwrecks: 10 August 1900
| Ship | State | Description |
|---|---|---|
| Lexington | United States | The steamer struck a snag and sank in four feet (1.2 m) of water in the Great Kanawha River at Armstrongs Landing. Raised and repaired. |

=== 11 August ===
List of shipwrecks: 11 August 1900
| Ship | State | Description |
|---|---|---|
| Framée | France | The Framée-class destroyer was sunk in a collision. |

=== 12 August ===
List of shipwrecks: 12 August 1900
| Ship | State | Description |
|---|---|---|
| Mercury | United States | During a voyage in ballast from Nome, District of Alaska, to Seattle, Washington, the 1,050-gross register ton, 193-foot (58.8 m) wooden ship was beached on Unimak Island in the Aleutian Islands after she sprang a leak. Her entire crew of seven survived, but she was declared a total loss. |

=== 13 August ===
List of shipwrecks: 13 August 1900
| Ship | State | Description |
|---|---|---|
| Genivieve | United States | The steamer's stern line parted in a storm causing her to swing broadside to the storm and sink. Later raised. |

=== 14 August ===
List of shipwrecks: 14 August 1900
| Ship | State | Description |
|---|---|---|
| Allavina Johnson | United States | The 35.85-net register ton schooner was wrecked when she dragged her anchors during a gale and was blown ashore in Goodnews Bay (59°03′N 161°49′W) on the west-central coast of the District of Alaska, 22 nautical miles (41 km; 25 mi) north of Cape Newenham (58°39′00″N 162°10′30″W). Her crew of three survived, but she became a total loss. |
| Elvin A. Thompson | United States | The steamer was wrecked near Cape Newenham (58°39′00″N 162°10′30″W) on the coast of the District of Alaska. |
| Little Tom Moss | United States | The steamer struck an obstruction and sank at Lockhart's Point. Raised and broken up. |

=== 15 August ===
List of shipwrecks: 15 August 1900
| Ship | State | Description |
|---|---|---|
| Robert | United States | The steamer sprung a leak and sank one and a half miles (2.4 km) below Branford, Florida in the Suwanee River. Raised and repaired. |

=== 16 August ===
List of shipwrecks: 16 August 1900
| Ship | State | Description |
|---|---|---|
| Futami Maru | Japan | The steamship went aground on a reef at Mindoro Island, near Manila, while on a voyage from Australia to Eastern ports. All the crew and 150 passengers were taken to shore, and a consignment of gold bullion was salvaged. |

=== 17 August ===
List of shipwrecks: 17 August 1900
| Ship | State | Description |
|---|---|---|
| Blue Stone | United States | The tow steamer sank over night at dock in Port Richmond, Staten Island. |
| Eclipse | United States | The laid up steamer broke free from her moorings during a severe windstorm and was blown onto a reef of rocks and sank in three feet (0.91 m) of water at LeClaire, Iowa. Later raised and repaired. |
| Lynn J. | United States | The steamer destroyed by fire in the Mississippi River 12 miles (19 km) above New Orleans. |

=== 19 August ===
List of shipwrecks: 19 August 1900
| Ship | State | Description |
|---|---|---|
| Argonaut | United States | The steamer sprung a leak and sank in shoal water at Escanaba, Michigan. |

=== 22 August ===
List of shipwrecks: 22 August 1900
| Ship | State | Description |
|---|---|---|
| Antoinette | France | The Dundee-class yacht, en route from Saint-Cast-Le-Guildo, Brittany, France, to Denmark loaded with wheat, was lost south of Guernsey in the Channel Islands. The four crew survived."Wreck of a Cutter off Guersney. A Very Narrow Escape", The Star (St Peter Port, Guersney) |
| Specular | United States | The steamer sank in 20 feet (6.1 m) of water in a collision with Denver (United States) in Lake Erie between Point Pelee and Pelee Island. |

=== 23 August ===
List of shipwrecks: 23 August 1900
| Ship | State | Description |
|---|---|---|
| Guy Hunter | United States | The steamer careened and sank rounding a bend in the Senet Canal. Later raised. |

=== 24 August ===
List of shipwrecks: 24 August 1900
| Ship | State | Description |
|---|---|---|
| Duke | United States | The steamer foundered while pumping out a sunken barge when the rising barge tipped the steamer and she flooded and sank at a Levee in Davenport, Iowa. Later raised. |
| Mataura | New Zealand | The refrigerated barque was dismasted and abandoned in the Pacific Ocean. She subsequently foundered. Mataura was on a voyage from Levuka, Fiji, to Nantes, Loire-Inférieure, France. |
| William D. | United States | The tow steamer was sunk in a collision with tow steamer Alpha (United States) on Lake Erie near Ashtabula, Ohio. One crewman killed. |

=== 31 August ===
List of shipwrecks: 31 August 1900
| Ship | State | Description |
|---|---|---|
| Sophia Sutherland | United States | The 156-ton three-masted schooner ran aground on the coast of Baillie Island in the Northwest Territories in Canada. A gale destroyed her there on 26 September before she could be refloated. |

=== Unknown date ===
List of shipwrecks: Unknown date 1900
| Ship | State | Description |
|---|---|---|
| Mayflower | United States | The sloop was wrecked with the loss of her entire crew of seven on Nelson Island near Hooper Bay in the District of Alaska. |
| Research | United Kingdom | Stored on blocks at the Government Barracks in the harbor at St. Michael in the District of Alaska since her seizure by the United States Customs Service on 25 September 1899, the 26.5-ton iron sternwheel paddle steamer was thrown from the blocks against the bank of the harbor and wrecked during a gale. |
| W. K. Merwin | United States | The steamer was blown ashore and wrecked near Nome, Alaska near the Mouth of the Snake River, or in Norton Sound near the mouth of the Yukon River on 10 August 1900 or 28 July 1900 or sometime in December 1899/January 1900. |

== September ==
=== 1 September ===
List of shipwrecks: 1 September 1900
| Ship | State | Description |
|---|---|---|
| Bouët-Willaumez | French Navy | The torpedo boat sank in 25 fathoms (150 ft; 46 m) of water without loss of life after striking a rock in fog in the English Channel off the harbor at Cherbourg, France, on the evening of 31 August. Salvage efforts failed. |

=== 3 September ===
List of shipwrecks: 3 September 1900
| Ship | State | Description |
|---|---|---|
| Caroline | United Kingdom | The ship schooner was driven ashore at Eastbourne, Sussex. Three crew were taken off by the Eastbourne Lifeboat James Stephens No.6 ( Royal National Lifeboat Institution), her captain refusing to leave. He was later taken off by the Coastguard using a breeches buoy. |
| Mayflower | United States | The ferry sank in shallow water after a collision with George Emerson (United States) at Duluth, Wisconsin. |
| Nugget | United States | The steamer broke free from her moorings and was blown ashore in a gale at Nome, Alaska. |

=== 4 September ===
List of shipwrecks: 4 September 1900
| Ship | State | Description |
|---|---|---|
| Ralph | United States | The steamer struck an obstruction and sank at Norfolk, Mississippi, a total loss. |

=== 6 September ===
List of shipwrecks: 6 September 1900
| Ship | State | Description |
|---|---|---|
| Charles H. Hamilton | United States | The river steamer was lost at Point Romanoff (63°12′N 162°50′W) on the west coast of the District of Alaska. |
| Harriet | United States | The wreck of Harriet on 17 September 1900. With a crew of nine and a cargo of dogs, reindeer, and skins aboard, the 92-ton, 91.3-foot (27.8 m) schooner was wrecked during a storm on the coast of the District of Alaska 2 nautical miles (3.7 km; 2.3 mi) west of Nome. Her crew survived. |

=== 7 September ===
List of shipwrecks: 7 September 1900
| Ship | State | Description |
|---|---|---|
| Catherine Sudden | United States | The 386-ton barkentine was as driven ashore in a gale and wrecked at Cape Nome on the coast of the District of Alaska, becoming a total loss. |
| Cyclone | United States | The steamer sank after striking a sunken crib in Charlotte. |
| Sequoia | United States | The 341-gross register ton, 150-foot (46 m) schooner was driven ashore and wrecked at Nome, District of Alaska. Her crew of eight survived. She may have been salvaged in 1902. |
| Zenith | United States | The schooner was wrecked on the beach at Nome, District of Alaska. |

=== 8 September ===
List of shipwrecks: 8 September 1900
| Ship | State | Description |
|---|---|---|
| Cumberland | United States | 1900 Galveston Hurricane: The steamer broke loose from her moorings and sank at Galveston, Texas. |
| Louise | United States | 1900 Galveston Hurricane: The steamer sank on a trip from Clinton to Galveston, Texas, possibly raised. Two crewmen killed. |
| Mary Flint | United States | The sailing ship collided with the anchored USS Iowa (United States Navy) and then the bark Vidette (United States) and sank in San Francisco Bay. |

=== 9 September ===
List of shipwrecks: 9 September 1900
| Ship | State | Description |
|---|---|---|
| John Endicott | United States | The steamer struck a ledge in the inner channel near the Minot Light causing her to be beached to prevent sinking. Pulled off later but sank in seven fathoms (42 ft; 13 m) of water while under tow to Boston for repairs. |

=== 11 September ===
List of shipwrecks: 11 September 1900
| Ship | State | Description |
|---|---|---|
| Dundee | United States | Great Storm of 1900: The schooner was sunk in a gale, the remnants of the hurricane that hit Galveston, Texas, on Lake Erie near Ashtabula, Ohio, a total loss. Nine crewmen killed, seven survivors. |

=== 12 September ===
List of shipwrecks: 12 September 1900
| Ship | State | Description |
|---|---|---|
| Dusty Diamond | United States | The 101-gross register ton, 75-foot (22.9 m) sternwheel paddle steamer dragged her anchor during a gale and was wrecked at the northern end of Golovnin Bay on the west coast of the District of Alaska. Her crew of six survived, but she became a total loss. |
| F. Lavergne | United States | The tug was destroyed by fire overnight at New Baltimore, New York. |
| General McPherson | United States | The 90-foot (27.4 m) schooner dragged her anchor when a storm surge struck her during a gale and was wrecked on the east side of Safety Harbor (64°29′N 164°45′W) on the west-central coast of the District of Alaska. Her crew of eight survived. |
| Jessie | United States | While moored with no one aboard, the 38-gross register ton, 54.4-foot (16.6 m) schooner was driven ashore and wrecked during a gale at Nome, District of Alaska. |
| John B. Lyon | United States | Great Storm of 1900: The steamer was sunk in a gale, the remnants of the hurricane that hit Galveston, Texas, on Lake Erie near Ashtabula, Ohio, a total loss. Nine crewmen killed, seven survivors. |
| Prosper | United States | The 23-gross register ton, 45-foot (13.7 m) schooner was wrecked during a gale on the coast of the District of Alaska near the mouth of the Penny River near Nome. Her captain was washed overboard and drowned, but the other six members of her crew survived. She may have been salvaged in 1902. |
| Skookum | United States | The wreck of Skookum While at anchor off Nome, District of Alaska, with 11 passengers, two crew members, and 200 tons of cargo including lumber and stores on board, the 1,981-ton schooner barge began to break up rapidly in heavy seas. Her crew slipped her anchors to allow her to drift ashore so that all on board could escape. All 13 people on board reached shore safely, but Skookum was wrecked. |
| Three unidentified umiaks | United States | The three umiaks sank in the Bering Sea during a voyage from King Island to the mainland of the District of Alaska, drowning over 100 Alaska Natives on board them. |

=== 14 September ===
List of shipwrecks: 14 September 1900
| Ship | State | Description |
|---|---|---|
| Edith Thomas | United States | The tug was wrecked on the beach at Nome, District of Alaska. |
| Islam | United States | The tug was wrecked on the beach at Nome, District of Alaska. |
| Leo | United States | The steamer snagged on her dock overnight on a rising tide, careened, filled and sank. Raised and repaired. |

=== 15 September ===
List of shipwrecks: 15 September 1900
| Ship | State | Description |
|---|---|---|
| Bob | United States | The steamer was lying by the beach in a heavy gale and was blown ashore at Nome, District of Alaska. Sbe became a total loss due to wave action. |
| Letha R. Thomas | United States | The steamer foundered in a heavy gale at Nome, District of Alaska, a total loss. The steamer Aloha (United States) rescued her crew. |
| Siesta | United States | The steamer was lying by the beach in a heavy gale and was blown ashore at Nome, District of Alaska, becoming a total loss due to wave action. |
| Strae | United States | The steamer broke free from her moorings in a heavy gale and was blown ashore at Nome, District of Alaska, a total loss. |
| Sunflower | United States | The steamer broke free from her moorings in a gale and was blown ashore in the Snake River in District of Alaska, a total loss. |
| Tobie | United States | The steamer was lying by the beach in a heavy gale and was blown ashore at Nome, District of Alaska, becoming a total loss due to wave action. |

=== 17 September ===
List of shipwrecks: 17 September 1900
| Ship | State | Description |
|---|---|---|
| Orizaba | United States | Shortly after departing St. Michael, District of Alaska, to lay submarine cable for the United States Government with eight passengers, a crew of 46, and 285 tons of submarine cable aboard, the 967-gross register ton 205-foot (62.5 m) schooner was wrecked without loss of life near St. Michael on an uncharted reef – thereafter known as Orizaba Reef (63°31′10″N 162°01′50″W) – 2.5 nautical miles (4.6 km; 2.9 mi) off Rocky Point. |

=== 18 September ===
List of shipwrecks: 18 September 1900
| Ship | State | Description |
|---|---|---|
| American (or America) | United States | The tug collided with the ocean liner Minnehaha (United Kingdom), or was capsized by a line to the ship that was too tight causing her to roll over, and sank in New York Harbor. Two of the tug's crewmen were killed. Later salvaged and recommissioned. |
| Charkieh | United Kingdom | The steamship was wrecked.in Karystos Bay, en route to Piraeus from Alexandria, Egypt during a gale. 18 passengers and 21 crew were lost, 60 were rescued. |

=== 20 September ===
List of shipwrecks: 20 September 1900
| Ship | State | Description |
|---|---|---|
| Ellenora Van Dusen | United States | Carrying a cargo of stone, the 126-foot (38 m), 250-gross register ton three-masted schooner caught fire and was towed into the harbor at Gloucester, Massachusetts, so that her cargo could be salvaged. She sank inside the Dog Bar breakwater in up to 40 feet (12 m) of water. |

=== 21 September ===
List of shipwrecks: 21 September 1900
| Ship | State | Description |
|---|---|---|
| Carrier | United States | The steamer was destroyed by a fire that started on War Eagle (United States) at St. Louis, Missouri. |
| John Martin | United States | The schooner barge, under tow of Maurice P. Grover (United States) sank in the St. Clair River off the Fort Gratiot Light in a collision with Yuma (United States) 400 feet (120 m) below the wreck of Fontana (United States). The wreck was blown up to open up the shipping channel. Her captain, two crewmen, and her female cook were killed. Four crewmen survived, one was rescued by a small boat, three by Yuma. |
| Peter J. Clark | United States | The steamer was lying at the bank for repairs at Caruthersville, Missouri when she burned, a total loss. |

=== 22 September ===
List of shipwrecks: 22 September 1900
| Ship | State | Description |
|---|---|---|
| Letha R. Thomas | United States | The 7-net register ton, 37-foot (11.3 m) steamer was swamped by heavy seas during a gale and sank 2.25 nautical miles (4.2 km; 2.6 mi) off Nome, District of Alaska. The steamer Aloha (United States) rescued her crew of three. |
| Nonpareil | United Kingdom | The sailing ship capsized and sank in the Atlantic Ocean (39°50′N 22°00′W) in a gale from inadequate ballast. Her crew were rescued by Glengoil (United Kingdom), Glengoil lost 1 crewman and both of her lifeboats in the rescue. |

=== 24 September ===
List of shipwrecks: 24 September 1900
| Ship | State | Description |
|---|---|---|
| Suffolk | United Kingdom | The 5,364 GRT refrigerated cargo steamship on a voyage from Fiume to Port Elizabeth with a cargo of 930 horses ran aground off Tsitsikamma Point and eventually foundered. All 130 people on board were saved by steamer SS Lake Erie and safely landed at Port Elizabeth. |

=== 26 September ===
List of shipwrecks: 26 September 1900
| Ship | State | Description |
|---|---|---|
| M. P. Howlett | United States | The steamer caught fire at Pier B, Port Richmond, Philadelphia and was towed out on to the flats where she filled with water. |

=== 27 September ===
List of shipwrecks: 27 September 1900
| Ship | State | Description |
|---|---|---|
| European | United Kingdom | The ship was wrecked on Callantsoog, Groningen, Netherlands. She was on a voyage from Hull, Yorkshire to Harlingen, Friesland, Netherlands. She was a total loss. |

=== 30 September ===
List of shipwrecks: 30 September 1900
| Ship | State | Description |
|---|---|---|
| Jeanie | United States | The steamer stranded on Point Arena, California. Pulled off on 6 October. |

=== Unknown date ===
List of shipwrecks: Unknown date September 1900
| Ship | State | Description |
|---|---|---|
| Arthur B | United States | The small schooner was driven ashore and pounded to pieces by the surf during a storm at Cape Nome of the coast of the Seward Peninsula in the District of Alaska on 7 or 8 September. |
| Lydia Mayflower | United States | The schooner ran onto rocks on the coast of the District of Alaska at Cape Prince of Wales and was pounded to pieces by the surf. The schooner Alice (United States) rescued her crew. |
| Manchester | United Kingdom | The sailing ship departed New York City for Shanghai on 23 August and vanished after making contact with Olbia (France) on 23 September at (12°18′N 28°54′W). Lost with all 31 crew. |
| Victoria | United States | The schooner was wrecked on rocks on the coast of the District of Alaska at Cape Prince of Wales. The schooner Alice (United States) rescued her crew. |
| York | United States | The 231-gross register ton, 131-foot (40 m) two-masted schooner was wrecked on the beach at Nome, District of Alaska, sometime between 12 and 15 September. |

== October ==
=== 1 October ===
List of shipwrecks: 1 October 1900
| Ship | State | Description |
|---|---|---|
| Borgo | Imperial Russian Navy | The Borgo-class torpedo boat sank in the Yellow Sea after colliding with the torpedo boat Ussuri (Imperial Russian Navy). |

=== 2 October ===
List of shipwrecks: 2 October 1900
| Ship | State | Description |
|---|---|---|
| Fleetwing | United States | The tug was sunk in a collision with Major Barrett (United States) at the mouth of the Schuylkill River. Two crewmen killed. |
| Ida Meyer | United States | The canal boat was sunk in a collision with steamer Express (United States) in the Harlem River off One Hundred Twenty Sixth Street. |

=== 5 October ===
List of shipwrecks: 5 October 1900
| Ship | State | Description |
|---|---|---|
| Bowhead | United States | The schooner was wrecked on the beach at the entrance to the Sinrock River (64°35′N 166°15′W) 20 miles (32 km) west of Nome, District of Alaska. Her crew of seven survived. |
| Narvik | Norway | The cargo ship struck an object and sank in the White Sea. |
| Swallow | United States | The steamer sank in the St. Clair River below Marine City, Michigan in a collision with Sir William Siemens (United States). |

=== 6 October ===
List of shipwrecks: 6 October 1900
| Ship | State | Description |
|---|---|---|
| Econa | United States | The tug burned below Albany, New York, a total loss. |
| Fram | United States | The steamer sank at Grand Forks, North Dakota from unknown causes. |
| Merom | United States | With a 500-ton cargo, including 12,574 cases of canned salmon, and a crew of 16 on board, the 1,158-gross register ton, 179.2-foot (54.6 m) bark was wrecked during a gale in the harbor at Karluk, District of Alaska, with the loss of one life, a crewman who refused to abandon ship. |

=== 7 October ===
List of shipwrecks: 7 October 1900
| Ship | State | Description |
|---|---|---|
| A. A. Shaw | United States | The schooner sank in the Atlantic Ocean off the mouth of the Delaware Bay, or off the Scotland Lightship, or three miles (4.8 km) off the Northeast End Lightship, after being almost cut in two by the steamship Hamilton (United States) in fog. Hamilton rescued all seven crew members. |

=== 10 October ===
List of shipwrecks: 10 October 1900
| Ship | State | Description |
|---|---|---|
| City of Monticello | United Kingdom | The paddle steamer foundered in the Bay of Fundy four nautical miles (7.4 km) off Yarmouth, Nova Scotia, Canada with the loss of 36 of her 40 crew. She was on a voyage from Saint John, New Brunswick, Canada to Yarmouth. |

=== 12 October ===
List of shipwrecks: 12 October 1900
| Ship | State | Description |
|---|---|---|
| Emma & Louisa | United States | The 84-ton, 83-foot (25.3 m) schooner ran aground on the south-central coast of the District of Alaska 1/8 nautical mile (0.23 km; 0.14 mi) from Hope City (60°55′15″N 149°38′30″W). She broke in two when the tide went out and became a total loss. |

=== 15 October ===
List of shipwrecks: 15 October 1900
| Ship | State | Description |
|---|---|---|
| Frances E. Spinner | United States | The steamer was sunk in a collision with H. D. Coffinberry (United States) when she sheared off course when passed by Rhodes (United States) in the St. Marys River, sinking in 17 feet (5.2 m) of water near Nine-Mile Point. Raised and taken to Sault Ste. Marie, Michigan for temporary repairs on 25 October, and then proceeded to Manitowoc, Wisconsin on her own power arriving on 30 October for permanent repairs. |

=== 16 October ===
List of shipwrecks: 16 October 1900
| Ship | State | Description |
|---|---|---|
| Edward Wilde | United States | The steamer was wrecked when she drifted onto Plum Island after her tow steamer, Wm. E. Witter (United States), became disabled in rough seas when her main steam pipe broke. A total loss. |
| Ruby A. Cousins | United States | Carrying 275 tons of groceries, food, hay, coal, and lumber and a crew of eight, the 193-gross register ton, 112.5-foot (34.3 m) schooner was blown onto a reef and wrecked without loss of life in Stanton Narrows, now called Valdez Narrows (61°03′15″N 146°40′30″W), in Prince William Sound on the south-central coast of the District of Alaska. She was salvaged, repaired, and returned to service with the name Harold Blekum (United States). |
| Wm. E. Witter | United States | The tow steamer was disabled in rough seas when her main steam pipe broke. She and two vessels she was towing were wrecked when they drifted onto Plum Island, a total loss. |
| Wm. H. Needham | United States | The steamer was wrecked when she drifted onto Plum Island after her tow steamer, Wm. E. Witter (United States), became disabled in rough seas when her main steam pipe broke. A total loss. |

=== 17 October ===
List of shipwrecks: 17 October 1900
| Ship | State | Description |
|---|---|---|
| Velma | United States | The 81-foot (25 m), 96-gross register ton schooner was wrecked during a gale and snowstorm in the Bay of Fundy on Cross Jack Ledge, a reef that is part of the Murr Ledges, off the south side of Grand Manan, New Brunswick, Canada. One crewmen perished. The three survivors clung to the almost-submerged rocks of Cross Jack Ledge in the storm for 44 hours before men in a boat from Three Islands rescued them. |

=== 18 October ===
List of shipwrecks: 18 October 1900
| Ship | State | Description |
|---|---|---|
| Allen Gurney | United States | The schooner was rammed while at anchor by the steamer John H. Starin (United States) in the harbor of New Haven, Connecticut, and sank in 26 feet (7.9 m) of water. |

=== 20 October ===
List of shipwrecks: 20 October 1900
| Ship | State | Description |
|---|---|---|
| Kommandøren | Norway | The passenger-cargo ship ran aground near Tjugum in Balestrand, Norway. She was refloated and returned to service. |
| Maude | United States | Carrying a cargo of 878 sacks of coal totaling 65 tons, the 161-ton barge was wrecked on the coast of the District of Alaska near St. Michael, about 3 nautical miles (5.6 km; 3.5 mi) east of Lamont Point (63°27′N 162°00′W) after the coal vessel towing her, Canarvin (United States), was forced to cut her loose during a storm. Her crew of three survived, but by 22 October the surf had broken her into three pieces on the beach. |

=== 22 October ===
List of shipwrecks: 22 October 1900
| Ship | State | Description |
|---|---|---|
| Laurena | United States | The steamer was destroyed by fire at dock in Lincolnville, Maine. |

=== 23 October ===
List of shipwrecks: 23 October 1900
| Ship | State | Description |
|---|---|---|
| Cleveland | United States | Carrying 10 cargo handlers, a crew of 29, and a cargo of 300 tons of coal, the 1,160-gross register ton, 258.2-foot (78.7 m) steamer was wrecked on Cape Rodney (64°39′N 165°24′W) on the west-central coast of the District of Alaska in a snowstorm and sank with the loss of one life. The revenue cutter USRC McCulloch ( United States Revenue Cutter Service) rescued her 38 survivors from the beach. |
| Sunol | United States | The steamer was destroyed by fire at dock at Little River, California, a total loss. |

=== 24 October ===
List of shipwrecks: 24 October 1900
| Ship | State | Description |
|---|---|---|
| Fischer Brothers | United States | The two-masted, 76-foot (23.2 m) schooner was blown onto a rock and wrecked on the west-central coast of the District of Alaska several miles northwest of Cape Rodney (64°39′N 165°24′W) in bad weather. All eight people on board – one passenger and a crew of seven – reached shore, where her captain died of exposure several days later. |
| Josie Weaver | United States | The motor schooner was destroyed by fire at New Orleans due to a defective lamp exploding. |
| Smoky City | United States | The steamer burned and sank in the Ohio River near Saw Mill Run. Later raised and everything of value removed. |

=== 26 October ===
List of shipwrecks: 26 October 1900
| Ship | State | Description |
|---|---|---|
| Martha | United States | The barge sank in a collision with E. P. Wilbur (United States) in Lake St. Clair. |

=== 28 October ===
List of shipwrecks: 28 October 1900
| Ship | State | Description |
|---|---|---|
| William Shakespeare | United States | The passenger barge was destroyed by fire at Ellwood Landing on the Atchafalaya River. |

=== 29 October ===
List of shipwrecks: 29 October 1900
| Ship | State | Description |
|---|---|---|
| Eagle | United States | The steamer was damaged by a sudden increase of wind that pushed her into the west pier of Merchant's Bridge, St. Louis, Missouri. She was beached, but sank. |

=== 31 October ===
List of shipwrecks: 31 October 1900
| Ship | State | Description |
|---|---|---|
| Joe Mathews | United States | The tug was wrecked on the beach at Nome, District of Alaska, during a storm. |
| Mamie | United States | The steamer sank while under tow in the Gulf of Mexico 35 miles (56 km) off Mobile Bay. |
| Nome | United States | The barge was wrecked on the beach at Nome, District of Alaska, during a storm. |

=== Unknown date ===
List of shipwrecks: Unknown date October 1900
| Ship | State | Description |
|---|---|---|
| Bee | United Kingdom | The steamship sank off Queensland, Australia. She was refloated, repaired, and returned to service. |
| Rathdown | United Kingdom | The sailing ship departed Yokohama, Japan for Port Townsend, Washington on 2 October and vanished. Lost with all 28 crew. |
| Sigfrid | United States | The schooner departed Gloucester, Massachusetts on 15 September and vanished. Believed to have sunk in a storm in October or November. Lost with all 13 crew. |

== November ==
=== 1 November ===
List of shipwrecks: 1 November 1900
| Ship | State | Description |
|---|---|---|
| Reuben L. Richardson | United States | The 97-gross register ton, 84.8-foot (25.8 m) schooner was wrecked without loss of life in Norton Sound on the coast of the District of Alaska 16 nautical miles (30 km; 18 mi) west of Cape Nome during a gale and snowstorm. |

=== 2 November ===
List of shipwrecks: 2 November 1900
| Ship | State | Description |
|---|---|---|
| Wachusett | United States | The lighter sank at dock at Constable Hook, New Jersey. |

=== 3 November ===
List of shipwrecks: 3 November 1900
| Ship | State | Description |
|---|---|---|
| Hill City | United States | The steamer struck an obstruction and sank two miles (3.2 km) below Memphis, Tennessee. Raised and repaired. |

=== 7 November ===
List of shipwrecks: 7 November 1900
| Ship | State | Description |
|---|---|---|
| Mouse | United Kingdom | The smack was wrecked at Cardigan, Wales. Her three crew were rescued by the lifeboat Lizzie & Charles Leigh Clare ( Royal National Lifeboat Institution). She was on a voyage from Chester, Cheshire, England, to Fishguard, Pembrokeshire, Wales. |

=== 9 November ===
List of shipwrecks: 9 November 1900
| Ship | State | Description |
|---|---|---|
| Gazelle | United States | The steamer struck Lower middle in Boston Harbor, heeled and filled with water. Later raised. |
| No. 75 | United States | The Empire Box, under tow of Ashbourne (United States) with two others, broke her tow line and sank between Constable Hook, New Jersey and the Gowanus Canal, Brooklyn. |

=== 10 November ===
List of shipwrecks: 10 November 1900
| Ship | State | Description |
|---|---|---|
| Canton River | United Kingdom | The Admiralty dredger was wrecked at Hong Kong in a typhoon. |

=== 13 November ===
List of shipwrecks: 13 November 1900
| Ship | State | Description |
|---|---|---|
| No. 3 | United States | The barge, under tow of S. M. Fisher, became waterlogged in a gale on Lake Erie near Long Point and sank. |
| No. 4 | United States | The barge, under tow of S. M. Fisher, became waterlogged in a gale on Lake Erie near Long Point and sank. |
| Unidentified launch belonging to USS Yosemite | United States Navy | 1900 Guam typhoon: The store ship Yosemite was heavily damaged by a typhoon after breaking loose from her moorings at Guam. She drifted out to sea. Probably while she was blowing around the harbor her steam launch sank in the harbor, killing five crewmen. |

=== 15 November ===
List of shipwrecks: 15 November 1900
| Ship | State | Description |
|---|---|---|
| USS Yosemite | United States Navy | 1900 Guam typhoon: The station ship, a former auxiliary cruiser, was heavily damaged by a typhoon on 13 November after breaking loose from her moorings at Guam. The vessel went aground crushing her bow, blowing free and grounded again damaging her rudder and propellers. She drifted out to sea. Yosemite was located north west of Guam on 15 November in sinking condition by USS Justin (United States Navy). Justin rescued her 173 crewmen and either scuttled Yosemite or the vessel foundered on her own. |

=== 16 November ===
List of shipwrecks: 16 November 1900
| Ship | State | Description |
|---|---|---|
| Pyrenees | United Kingdom | The ship caught fire and was beached on Sanatul Island in the Mangareva Islands in French Polynesia. She was on a voyage from Tacoma, Washington, United States, to Leith, Lothian, Scotland. She was abandoned as a total loss, but was sold in situ in 1902. She subsequently was refloated, repaired. and returned to service. |
| T.H. Camp | United States | The overloaded tugboat took on a heavy list and sank in Lake Superior between Madeline Island and Basswood Island after her cargo shifted in choppy seas, or as result of her engines being shifted into reverse for unknown reasons. |

=== 17 November ===
List of shipwrecks: 17 November 1900
| Ship | State | Description |
|---|---|---|
| Fife | Canada | On her maiden voyage, the steamer ran aground and sank at Twin Island, St John's Bay, Strait of Belle Isle. |
| Southwark | United States | The tug sank over night at South Street Wharf, Philadelphia. |

=== 21 November ===
List of shipwrecks: 21 November 1900
| Ship | State | Description |
|---|---|---|
| Minna | United States | The steamer struck a snag and sank at Lake Point Landing on the Red River, a total loss. |
| Myrtie M. Ross | United States | The steamer foundered in a severe gale on Lake St. Clair. Raised and sold in 1901, repaired and returned to service in 1902. Crew rescued by Walter Frost (United States). |

=== 23 November ===
List of shipwrecks: 23 November 1900
| Ship | State | Description |
|---|---|---|
| Carmen | Germany | The steamer collided with Hernosand (flag unknown) and sank in the Baltic Sea (54°43′N 12°52′E). |
| Minette | United States | The schooner was sunk in a collision with Governor Dingley (United States) in the harbor of Portland, Maine. |

=== 24 November ===
List of shipwrecks: 24 November 1900
| Ship | State | Description |
|---|---|---|
| Carroll | United States | The steamer sank at Knowlton, Louisiana. An attempt to raise her resulted in the vessel breaking in two, a total loss except for salvaging her boiler and machinery. |
| Neckan | United States | The steamer caught fire at Harpswell, Maine where she had been hauled out for the Winter. She was launched off the ways and scuttled to extinguish the fire, then hauled back out and repaired. |

=== 28 November ===
List of shipwrecks: 28 November 1900
| Ship | State | Description |
|---|---|---|
| John B. Patton | United States | The tug sank in a collision with a barge under tow of Winfield Cahill (United States) off Cooper's Point. Her cook drowned. |

=== 29 November ===
List of shipwrecks: 29 November 1900
| Ship | State | Description |
|---|---|---|
| Tillamook | United States | During a voyage from Unalaska in the Aleutian Islands to Seattle, Washington, carrying nine passengers, a crew of 19, and no cargo, the 265-gross register ton, 126.8-foot (38.6 m) steam screw schooner was wrecked without loss of life on Wood Island Reef in the Gulf of Alaska near Kodiak, District of Alaska. |

=== 30 November ===
List of shipwrecks: 30 November 1900
| Ship | State | Description |
|---|---|---|
| Jud Field | United States | The out of commission steamer burned to the waterline at dock at Kitemaug, Connecticut in the Thames River |

=== Unknown date ===
List of shipwrecks: Unknown date November 1900
| Ship | State | Description |
|---|---|---|
| Agot | United Kingdom | The barque was wrecked on the Whitford Sands, in the Bristol Channel. Her crew were rescued by the Llanelli pilot boat. |
| Cape Wrath | United Kingdom | The barque departed Callao, Peru for Portland, Oregon on 2 November and vanished. Lost with all 30 crew. |
| Sigfrid | United States | The schooner departed Gloucester, Massachusetts on 15 September and vanished. Believed to have sunk in a storm in October or November. Lost with all 13 crew. |
| USS Yosemite | United States Navy | The auxiliary cruiser was heavily damaged in a typhoon off Guam and was scuttled in mid-November after the collier USS Justin (United States Navy) took off her crew. |

== December ==
=== 2 December ===
List of shipwrecks: 2 December 1900
| Ship | State | Description |
|---|---|---|
| Pyrenees | United Kingdom | After her cargo of wheat caught fire during November due to spontaneous combustion while she was in the Pacific Ocean during a voyage from Tacoma, Washington, in the United States to Leith, Scotland, in the United Kingdom, the steel-hulled bark was beached on Mangareva in the Gambier Islands in the Tuamotu Archipelago, French Polynesia, burned out and abandoned. She was refloated in 1901, repaired in 1905, and returned to service under the name Manga Reva (United States). |
| 19 coal boats & 1 coal flat | United States | The tow steamer Tom Dodsworth (United States) collided in dense fog with the tow steamer Volunteer (United States) near Swan Creek, Ohio sinking, between the two ships towage, 19 coal boats and one coal flat. Some of the boats were recovered when water levels dropped later. |

=== 4 December ===
List of shipwrecks: 4 December 1900
| Ship | State | Description |
|---|---|---|
| Rossgull | United Kingdom | On a voyage from Plymouth to Jersey in the Channel Islands, the ship ran aground at night off Corbiere, Jersey, in a gale. Eleven of her crew were saved but nine men in one lifeboat drowned. |
| Three States | United States | The steamer was destroyed by fire at dock at Columbus, Georgia. |

=== 6 December ===
List of shipwrecks: 6 December 1900
| Ship | State | Description |
|---|---|---|
| Cleone | United States | The steamer struck a submerged rock off Point Gorda, California and started filling, she drifted ashore six miles (9.7 km) south of the point, a total loss. |
| Idler | United States | The 10-gross register ton, 31-foot (9.4 m) schooner was wrecked on the north end of Coronation Island in the Alexander Archipelago in Southeast Alaska after her anchor chain parted during a gale. Her crew of two survived. |

=== 7 December ===
List of shipwrecks: 7 December 1900
| Ship | State | Description |
|---|---|---|
| Jennie | United States | The tug was damaged in a collision with the tug Wm. G. Williams (United States) in Boston Harbor, due to steering problem on Jennie. She sank at dock that evening. |
| Mary A. Brown | United States | The fishing schooner was wrecked in a gale and broke up at Hampton Beach, New Hampshire three miles (4.8 km) south of the United States Life Saving Service Station. All five crew were killed. |

=== 8 December ===
List of shipwrecks: 8 December 1900
| Ship | State | Description |
|---|---|---|
| J. L. Higgie | United States | The tug was destroyed by fire at dock in the River Rouge. |

=== 9 December ===
List of shipwrecks: 9 December 1900
| Ship | State | Description |
|---|---|---|
| Mary | United States | The steamer burned at St. Joseph, Michigan. Rebuilt and returned to service June 1901. |

=== 10 December ===
List of shipwrecks: 10 December 1900
| Ship | State | Description |
|---|---|---|
| Nordland | Norway | The lifeboat ran aground and was wrecked near Kjelvik, Norway. All crew members survived. |

=== 12 December ===
List of shipwrecks: 12 December 1900
| Ship | State | Description |
|---|---|---|
| Mary Mills | United States | The steamer burned at Harbor Beach, Michigan. |

=== 13 December ===
List of shipwrecks: 13 December 1900
| Ship | State | Description |
|---|---|---|
| Warren | United States | The steamer struck a snag and sank in the Mississippi River 12 miles (19 km) north of New Orleans, a total loss. |

=== 16 December ===
List of shipwrecks: 16 December 1900
| Ship | State | Description |
|---|---|---|
| SMS Gneisenau | Imperial German Navy | During a storm, the Bismarck-class corvette suffered a failure of her propulsion machinery, dragged her anchors, was wrecked on the harbor mole at Málaga, Spain, and sank with the loss of 40 lives. |

=== 17 December ===
List of shipwrecks: 17 December 1900
| Ship | State | Description |
|---|---|---|
| Short Cut | United States | The ferry struck a stump and sank in the Ohio River going from Locust Street to Corks Run, Pittsburgh. Later raised. |

=== 18 December ===
List of shipwrecks: 18 December 1900
| Ship | State | Description |
|---|---|---|
| Sarah Dixon | United States | The steamer struck a Government revetment in heavy fog and sank with her bow on the revetment at Mount Coffin, Washington in the Columbia River. Raised and taken to Portland, Oregon for repairs. |

=== 20 December ===
List of shipwrecks: 20 December 1900
| Ship | State | Description |
|---|---|---|
| Carrie Currens | United States | The steamer struck a snag and sank in the Pearl River near Gainesville, Mississippi. |

=== 21 December ===
List of shipwrecks: 21 December 1900
| Ship | State | Description |
|---|---|---|
| Lottie | United States | The tug sprung a leak, filled and sank at Brown's Wharf, San Francisco, California. Later raised. |

=== 22 December ===
List of shipwrecks: 22 December 1900
| Ship | State | Description |
|---|---|---|
| Guy | United States | During a voyage from Skagway to Haines, District of Alaska, the small steamer was lost in Southeast Alaska 1.5 nautical miles (2.8 km; 1.7 mi) below Skagway. |

=== 23 December ===
List of shipwrecks: 23 December 1900
| Ship | State | Description |
|---|---|---|
| Aloha | United States | The steamer was wrecked on a rock near Unga Island, Alaska. |
| Cariddi | Regia Marina | The gunboat was wrecked in the Red Sea on the coast of Italian Eritrea 70 nautical miles (130 km) north of Massawa. |

=== 24 December ===
List of shipwrecks: 24 December 1900
| Ship | State | Description |
|---|---|---|
| Brunswick | United Kingdom | The cargo ship ran aground off Black Nore Point, Somerset, England, and sank with the loss of seven of her fourteen crew. She was on a voyage from Liverpool, Lancashire, England, to Bristol, Gloucestershire, England. |

=== 28 December ===
List of shipwrecks: 28 December 1900
| Ship | State | Description |
|---|---|---|
| Croisine | France | The wreck of Croisine The 120 GRT brigantine was wrecked within minutes after stranding to the west of Les Sables-d'Olonne. Only one of the eight crew survived. |
| Enocuri | Spain | The steamer was driven on to the breakwater at Weymouth. |
| Gabriel | France | The Rouen fishing smack was wrecked off the Casquets in the Channel Islands. The six crew took to the ship's boat and were driven across the English Channel to a mud bank near Hurst Castle, Hampshire, where captain and one crew member was rescued by the coastguard. The fate of the other four crew is not known. |
| Jewess | United Kingdom | The Belfast schooner was driven ashore at Larne, Ireland. |
| Neptune | United Kingdom | The Portmadoc schooner broke up at Milford. |
| Pegasus | United Kingdom | The ship was driven ashore at Lavernock Point, Glamorgan with the loss of four of her crew. She was on a voyage from San Francisco, California, United States to Sharpness, Gloucestershire. Pegasus was later refloated and taken to Sharpness for repairs. |
| Primrose Hill | United Kingdom | The barque was wrecked 1.5 miles (2.4 km) east of South Stack off Holyhead, Wales, with the loss of 33 lives. One member of crew survived |
| Ragna | United Kingdom | The barque with coal from Cardiff for Brazil, went ashore at Trevine, near St David's Head. The captain and eight crew were saved by the rocket apparatus and three others drowned. |
| Seine | France | The barque was driven ashore and wrecked at Perranporth, Cornwall, United Kingdom. Her crew were rescued. |
| Tregorgina | United Kingdom | The small Bristol craft foundered at the mouth of the River Avon. The crew were saved. |
| Zefiro | Italy | The barque was in collision with the steamship King's County ( Canada) in the Bristol Channel off the English and Welsh Grounds Lightship (United Kingdom) and was consequently beached at Clevedon, Somerset. |
| Unnamed | United Kingdom | Seven or eight ships were driven ashore at Watchet, Somerset. |
| Unnamed | United Kingdom | Five lighters sank at Grangemouth, Scotland. |
| Unnamed | United Kingdom | Five vessels were driven ashore at Torryburn, Scotland. |
| Unnamed | United Kingdom | A harbour steam launch and four fishing boats were wrecked in the harbour at Larne, Ireland. |
| Unnamed | France | Nine fishing smacks were wrecked near Calais. |

=== 29 December ===
List of shipwrecks: 29 December 1900
| Ship | State | Description |
|---|---|---|
| Penpol | United Kingdom | The Falmouth, Cornwall steamer was driven ashore between Briton Ferry and Aberavon. The crew were safe. |

=== 30 December ===
List of shipwrecks: 30 December 1900
| Ship | State | Description |
|---|---|---|
| B.T.B. | United Kingdom | The vessel from Par, Cornwall ran ashore off Aldeburgh, Suffolk while carrying coal from Boston to London. The crew were brought ashore by the rocket apparatus. |
| Sento | Japan | The dredger foundered in a gale six miles (9.7 km) off Queenstown. Five crew rescued by the Cork pilot cutter and twelve drowned. |

=== Unknown date ===
List of shipwrecks: Unknown date December 1900
| Ship | State | Description |
|---|---|---|
| Capricorno | Austria-Hungary | The barque was wrecked at Bude, Cornwall, United Kingdom. |
| Copenhagen | United Kingdom | The steamer sank near Pompano Beach, Florida. |
| Manchester | United Kingdom | The four-masted barque disappeared after departing New York City for Yokohama, Japan, on 21 August 1900 and was wrecked on an unknown date, probably in late 1900, on Bikar Atoll in the Marshall Islands with the loss of all 34 people on board. Her wreck was discovered in July 1901. |
| St Petroc. | United Kingdom | The iron ketch left Liverpool for Padstow on 18 December and has not been heard of since. |
| Star of Scilly | United Kingdom | The ketch was wrecked on Porthminster Point, St. Ives, Cornwall, crew rescued by lifeboat. |
| Suihsiang | Germany | The river steamer was wrecked 60 miles (97 km) above Ichang. All survived except the captain. |
| Welbury | United Kingdom | The ship was wrecked near Hartland Point, Devon. |
| W.R.T. | United Kingdom | The fore-and-aft schooner sank in Morecambe Bay with the loss of her crew. |

== Unknown date ==
List of shipwrecks: Unknown date in 1900
| Ship | State | Description |
|---|---|---|
| Anadir | United States | The 73-gross register ton schooner sank off Port Jefferson, New York. All six people on board survived. |
| Arilla | United States | The 107-ton two-masted schooner was reported lost in the waters of the District of Alaska. She may have been salvaged and returned to service by 1901. |
| Challenge | United States | The 37-ton two-masted motor sealing schooner was wrecked at Nome, District of Alaska, during a storm and was declared a total loss. |
| Norman Sunde | United States | The schooner was wrecked on Five Fingers Island (57°17′30″N 133°40′15″W) in Southeast Alaska in 1900 or 1901. |
| Oliver Scolfield | Unknown | The schooner was lost at Chadwick, New Jersey. |
| Samoa | United States | The schooner was wrecked on the Bering Sea coast of the District of Alaska near Cape Rodney (64°39′N 165°24′W) during the summer of 1900. |

== Sources ==
- Annual Report of the United States Life-Saving Service for the fiscal year ending June 30, 1900 (Report). Washington, DC: Government Printing Office. 1901.
