= USS Justin (1891) =

US navy coal-carrying steamship

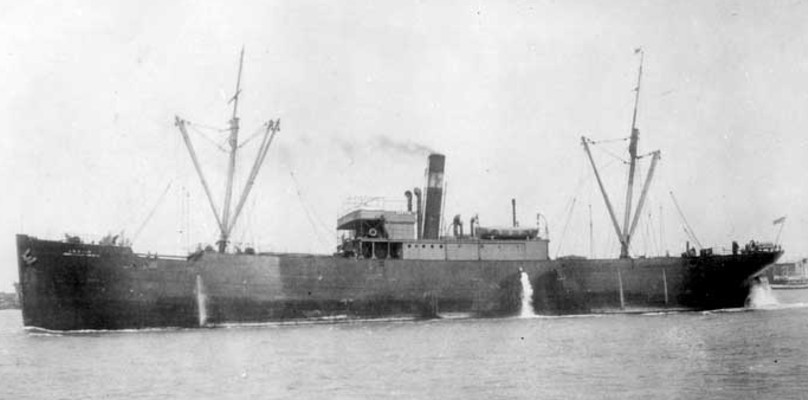
- USS Justin photographed after the expansion of her amidships superstructure and the addition of a raised navigating bridge. She retains her short well deck forward.

History

United States
- Name: USS Justin
- Namesake: a former name retained
- Owner: Bowring & Archibald
- Builder: R. Dixon & Co., Middlesbrough, England
- Launched: 23 December 1890
- Completed: February 1891
- Commissioned: 27 April 1898
- Recommissioned: 19 September 1900
- Decommissioned: 20 December 1915
- Fate: Sold 1916, scrapped 1933

General characteristics
- Type: Collier
- Displacement: 1,419 long tons (1,442 t)
- Length: 287 ft 6 in (87.63 m)
- Beam: 39 ft (12 m)
- Draft: 19 ft 8 in (5.99 m)
- Propulsion: steam engine, screw-driven
- Speed: 10 knots (12 mph; 19 km/h)
- Complement: 35
- Armament: 2 × 6-pounders

USS Justin was a steamship acquired by the United States Navy for use as a collier. Her task was to carry coal and to provide it to ships and stations. Her task was one that was being phased out, as the navies of the world were shifting from coal to oil to drive their ships.

== Service history ==
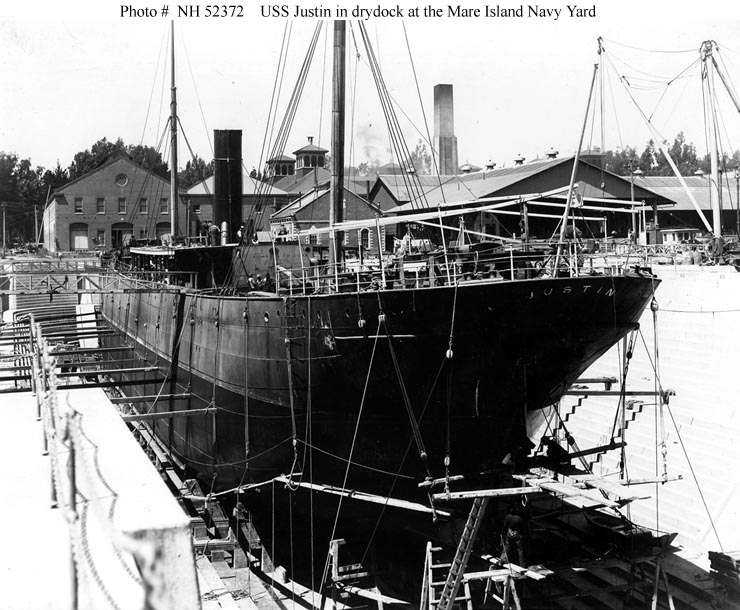
USS Justin (1898–1915) In drydock at the Mare Island Navy Yard, California, circa 1899–1900.

The first Justin to be named as such by the U.S. Navy, she was completed in 1891 by R. Dixon & Co., Middlesbrough, England; purchased from Bowring & Archibald; and commissioned on 27 April 1898. Justin performed collier service in the Chesapeake Bay area until sailing for Guantánamo Bay on 2 June for coaling duties during the Spanish–American War. Returning to Virginia, Justin operated along the East Coast of the United States and in New England, then departed Norfolk, Virginia on 11 October. After visiting Brazil, Chile, Peru, and Mexico, she arrived San Francisco, California on 3 February 1899 and decommissioned there on 17 February.

Recommissioned at Mare Island, California on 19 September 1900, Justin sailed on 1 October for duty in the Far East. 1900 Guam Typhoon: On 13 November 1900 she was at Guam when the island was hit by a typhoon. She escaped undamaged. Two days later she rescued the crew of USS Yosemite that had been damaged in port after by the storm after breaking her moorings and blown 60 miles from Guam. When found Yosemite was in sinking condition and after removing 173 crew she either scuttled Yosemite or she sank on her own. For the next seven years, she provided fuel and supplies to the Asiatic Fleet during a period of intense and growing American activity in the Orient. She returned to San Francisco, California on 23 November 1907 via Guam and Honolulu. From 1907 to 1915, Justin carried coal to units of the Pacific Fleet stationed at widely scattered points from the West Coast of the United States to South America. She decommissioned at Mare Island 20 December 1915, and was sold into commercial service in 1916 and scrapped in 1933.
