= SS William H. Gratwick =

Five merchant ships have been named SS William H. Gratwick.

- SS William H. Gratwick (1880), U.S. propeller, steam barge, Official No. 80777.
- SS William H. Gratwick (1882), U.S. propeller-tugboat, Official No. 80879.
- SS William H. Gratwick (1887), also known as Fleetwood, U.S. propeller, Official No. 81145.
- SS William H. Gratwick (1893), also known as SS Glenlyon, U.S., later Canadian propeller, US Official No. 81427/Can. Official No.126660.
- SS William H. Gratwick (1902), also known as Pegasus, U.S. propeller, Official No. 81801.
