= SS Sir William Siemens =

American lake freighter (1896–1944)

Coordinates: 41°57′33″N 81°57′14″W

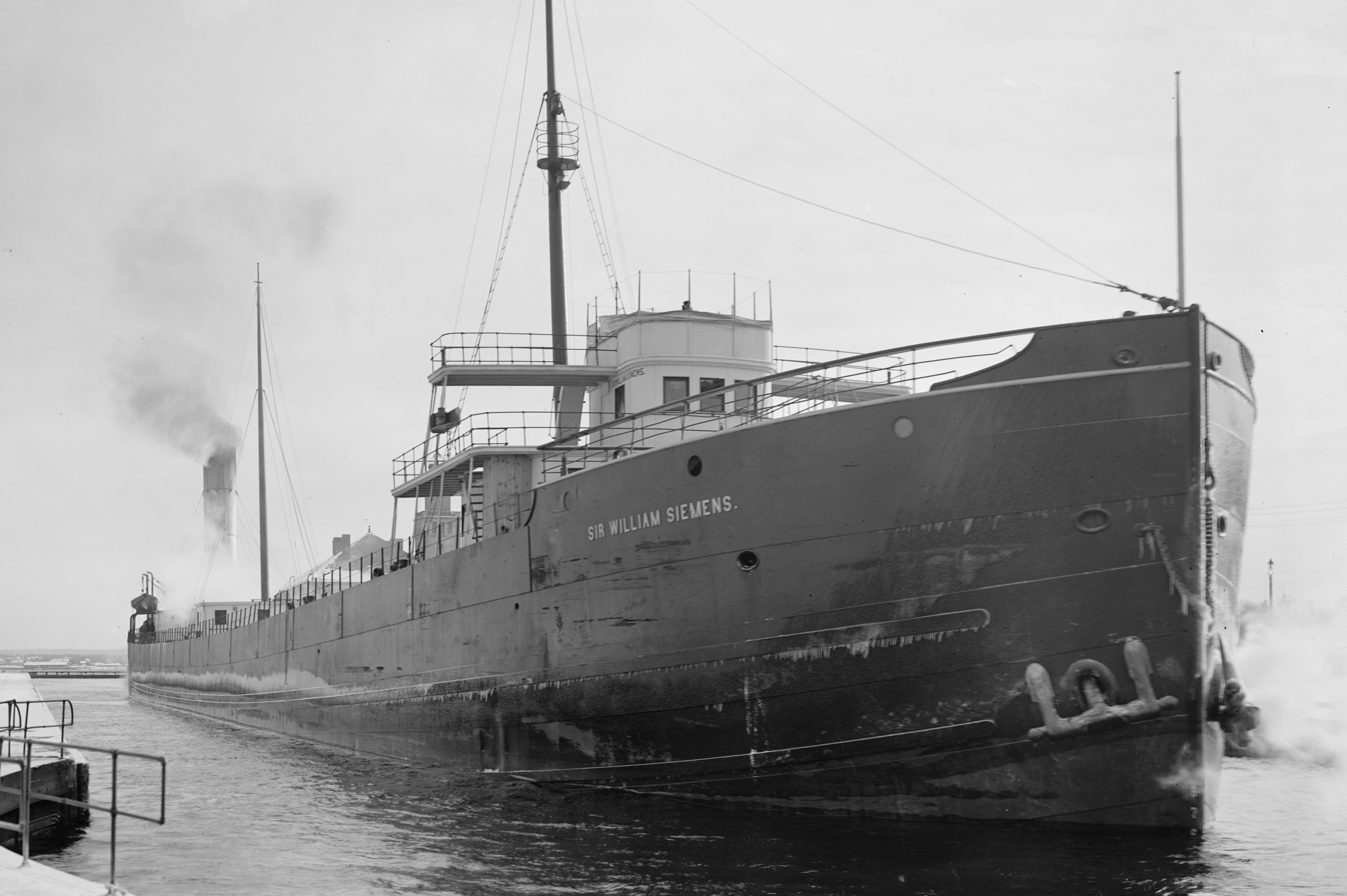
- Sir William Siemens c. 1904

History

United States
- Name: Sir William Siemens (1896–1929); William B. Pilkey (1929–1941); Frank E. Vigor (1941–1944)
- Namesake: Carl Wilhelm Siemens
- Operator: Bessemer Steamship Company (1896–1901); Pittsburgh Steamship Company (1901–1928); J. A. Paisley Steamship Company (1928–1935); Columbia Transportation Company (1935–1944)
- Port of registry: Duluth, Minnesota
- Builder: Globe Iron Works Company, Cleveland, Ohio
- Yard number: 67
- Launched: July 25, 1896
- Completed: July 15, 1896
- Maiden voyage: August 25, 1896
- Out of service: April 27, 1944
- Identification: US official number 116732
- Fate: Sank in a collision on Lake Erie

General characteristics
- Class & type: Lake freighter
- Tonnage: 4,344 GRT; 3,293 NRT
- Length: 432 ft (131.7 m) LOA; 412 ft (125.6 m) LBP
- Beam: 48 ft (14.6 m)
- Depth: 28 ft (8.5 m) (moulded)
- Installed power: Engine: 1 × 2,000 hp (1,500 kW) 82 rpm triple expansion steam engine; Boilers: 4 × 175 psi (1,210 kPa) Scotch marine boilers
- Propulsion: 1 × fixed pitch propeller
- Capacity: 6,000 long tons (6,096 t)

SS Sir William Siemens was a steel-hulled American lake freighter in service between 1896 and 1944. Built in 1896 by the Globe Iron Works Company of Cleveland for John D. Rockefeller's Bessemer Steamship Company, she was the third of three 432 ft-long (131.7 m) lake freighters, each of which shared the unofficial title of Queen of the Lakes due to their record-breaking length.

Built for use in the iron ore trade, she made her maiden voyage on August 25, 1896. In 1901, the Bessemer fleet merged into the Pittsburgh Steamship Company. Sir William Siemens was sold to the J. A. Paisley Steamship Company, and was renamed William B. Pilkey. She was sold to the Columbia Transportation Company in 1935, and was renamed Frank E. Vigor in 1941.

On the morning of April 27, 1944, Frank E. Vigor was traveling on Lake Erie in a thick fog, bound for Buffalo, New York, with a cargo of sulphur. While transiting the Pelee Passage, she collided with the freighter Philip Minch. Frank E. Vigor was badly damaged below the waterline, and quickly began to list. Her entire crew was rescued by Philip Minch. She eventually capsized and sank in 92 ft (28 m) of water.

== History ==
=== Background ===
In 1843, the gunship USS Michigan, built in Erie, Pennsylvania, became the first iron-hulled vessel built on the Great Lakes. In the mid-1840s, Canadian companies began importing iron vessels prefabricated by shipyards in the United Kingdom. Merchant, the first iron-hulled merchant ship constructed on the Great Lakes, was built in 1862. Despite the success of Merchant, wooden vessels remained preferable to iron ones until the 1880s, due to their inexpensiveness and the abundance of timber. In the early 1880s, shipyards around the Great Lakes began to construct iron ships on a relatively large scale. In 1884, the first steel freighters were built on the Great Lakes. By the 1890s, the majority of ships constructed on the lakes were made of steel. The late 19th and early 20th centuries saw a rapid increase in the size of lake freighters; the first 400 ft (121.9 m) freighter was built in 1895 and the first 500 ft (152.4 m) freighter was constructed five years later.

Throughout the 1880s, the iron ore trade on the Great Lakes grew exponentially, primarily due to the increasing size of the lake freighters, and the rise in the number of trips made by ore boats to the ore docks of Lake Superior. As the railways were unable to keep up with the rapid production of iron ore, most of it was transported by bulk freighters.

=== Design and construction ===
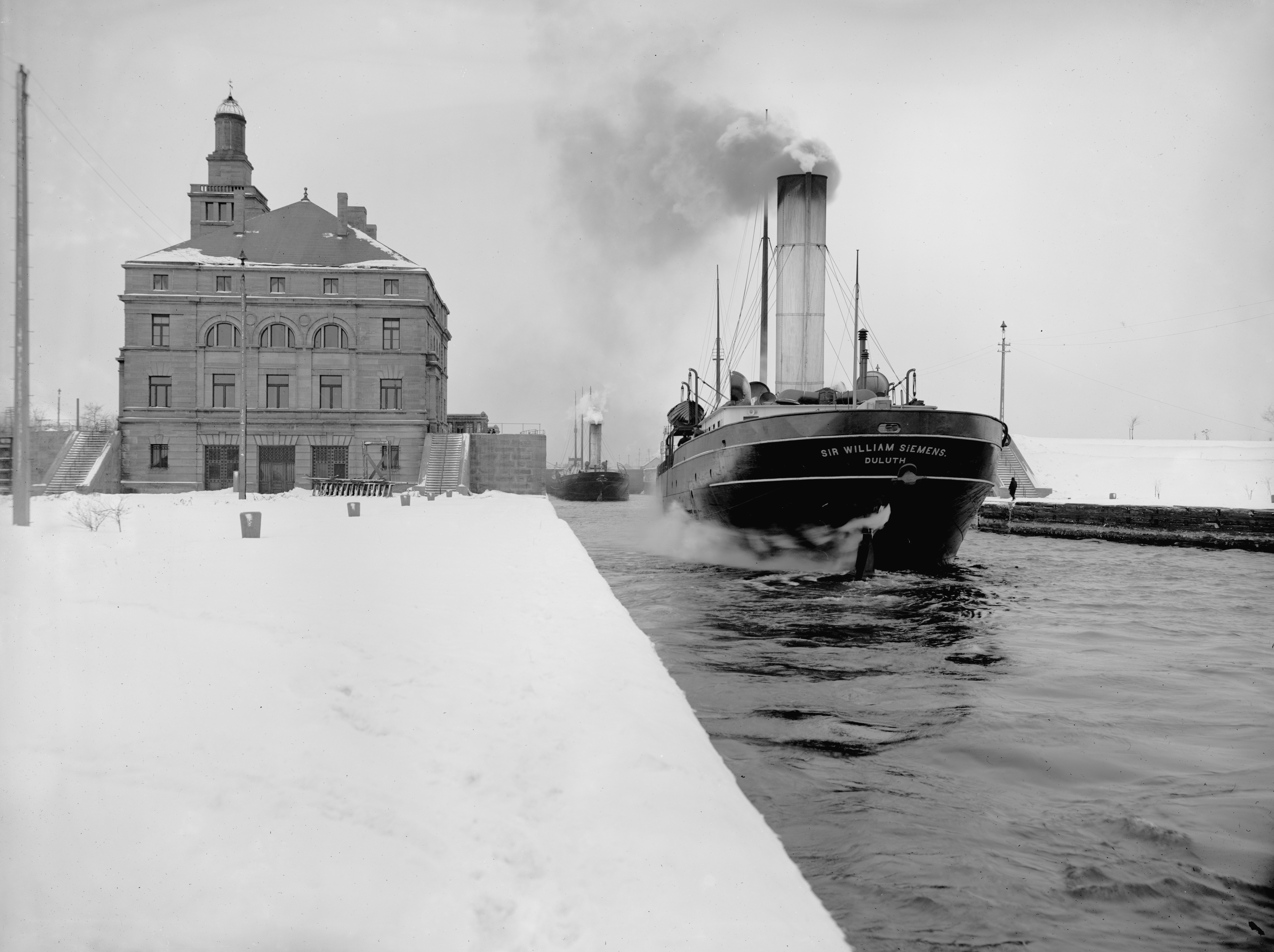
Sir William Siemens in the Soo Locks

Sir William Siemens (US official number 116732) was built in Cleveland, Ohio, in 1896 by the Globe Iron Works Company. Her construction was delayed by a strike at the shipyard after the launching of her sister ship Sir Henry Bessemer on May 9. She was completed on July 15, and was launched on July 25, 1896, as hull number 67. Sir William Siemens was built for John D. Rockefeller's Bessemer Steamship Company of Cleveland, and was named after German-British inventor Carl Wilhelm Siemens. Sir William Siemens was one of the largest ships on the Great Lakes at the time of her construction, earning her the unofficial title Queen of the Lakes, which she shared with her sister ship Sir Henry Bessemer and the M. A. Hanna & Company's freighter Coralia. They were surpassed in length on August 1, 1896, by the 445 ft-long (135.6 m) Sir William Fairbairn.

The cargo hold of Sir William Siemens was reminiscent of those found on older wooden lake freighters; between 1882 and 1904, the cargo holds of all iron and steel freighters contained stanchions and steel angles which were the equivalent of the knees used on wooden freighters. The hold was divided into four separate compartments by three screen bulkheads which stretched to the spar deck, and was accessed via twelve 8 ft-long (2.4 m) hatches located on 24 ft (7.3 m) centers. The four cargo compartments of Sir William Siemens' had capacities of 1,700 long tons (1,727 t), 1,300 long tons (1,321 t), 1,700 long tons (1,727 t) and 1,300 long tons (1,321 t), making her total cargo capacity 6,000 long tons (6,096 t). (Note: In an issue of The Marine Review published on March 18, 1909, Sir William Siemens' cargo carrying capacity is listed as 5,697 long tons (5,788 t).) Sir William Siemens' pilothouse was located behind her forecastle. She also had a deckhouse on her aft spar deck, which contained a galley and dining rooms; accommodations for her crew were housed in the aft deckhouse and forecastle. Her electric lighting system was manufactured by the General Electric Company of Schenectady, New York.

The hull of Sir William Siemens had an overall length of 432 ft (131.7 m), and a length between perpendiculars of 412 ft (125.6 m). (Note: Some sources list Sir William Siemens' length between perpendiculars as 413.16 ft (125.9 m) or 413.2 ft (125.9 m).) Her beam was 46 ft (14.0 m). The molded depth (roughly speaking, the vertical height of her hull) was 28 ft (8.5 m). (Note: Some sources list Sir William Siemens' hull depth as 24 ft (7.3 m).) The distance between the tip of Sir William Siemens' keel and the tip of her sheer strake was 28 ft 6.75 in (8.7 m), and the depth of the ballast tanks of her double bottom were 5 ft (1.5 m) deep. She had a gross register tonnage of 4344 tons, and a net register tonnage of 3293 tons. (Note: The Alpena County George N. Fletcher Public Library lists Sir William Siemens' gross and net register tonnage as 4344.49 tons and 3293.08 tons respectively.)

Sir William Siemens was powered by a 2,000 hp (1,500 kW) 84 rpm triple expansion steam engine; the cylinders of the engine were 25 in (63.5 cm), 41 in (104.1 cm) and 66 in (167.6 cm) in diameter, and had a stroke of 42 in (106.7 cm). Steam for the engine was provided by four 175 psi (1,210 kPa) Scotch marine boilers with a mean diameter of 11 ft 3 in (3.4 m), a length of 11 ft 11.5 in (3.6 m) and a heating surface of 6,300 sq ft (585.3 m^{2}); each boiler contained three furnaces with an inside diameter of 36 in (0.9 m). The engine and boilers were both built by the Globe Iron Works Company. Sir William Siemens' propeller was 14 ft (4.3 m) in diameter with a 16 ft (4.9 m) pitch. When traveling without cargo, she was capable of doing 14 mph (23 km/h), however, when she towed a barge she was able to reach a speed of 9 mph (14 km/h).

=== Service history ===
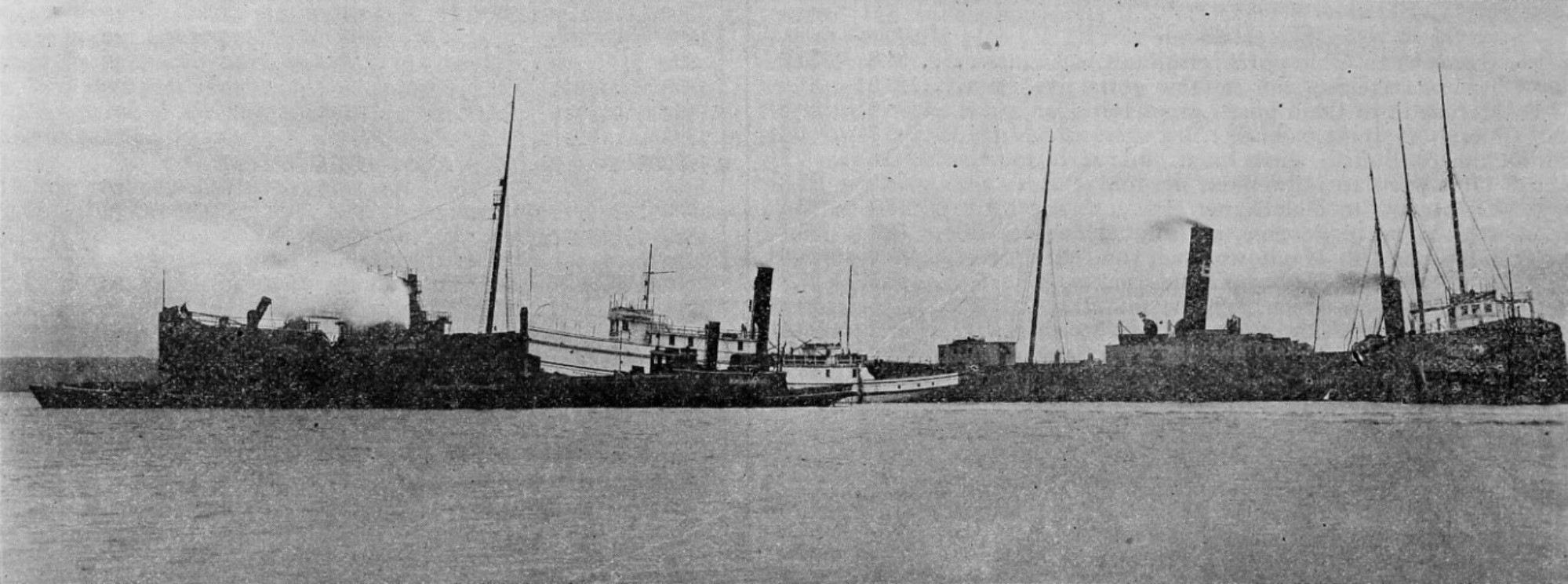
Side view of Sir William Siemens, with North Star visible on the right

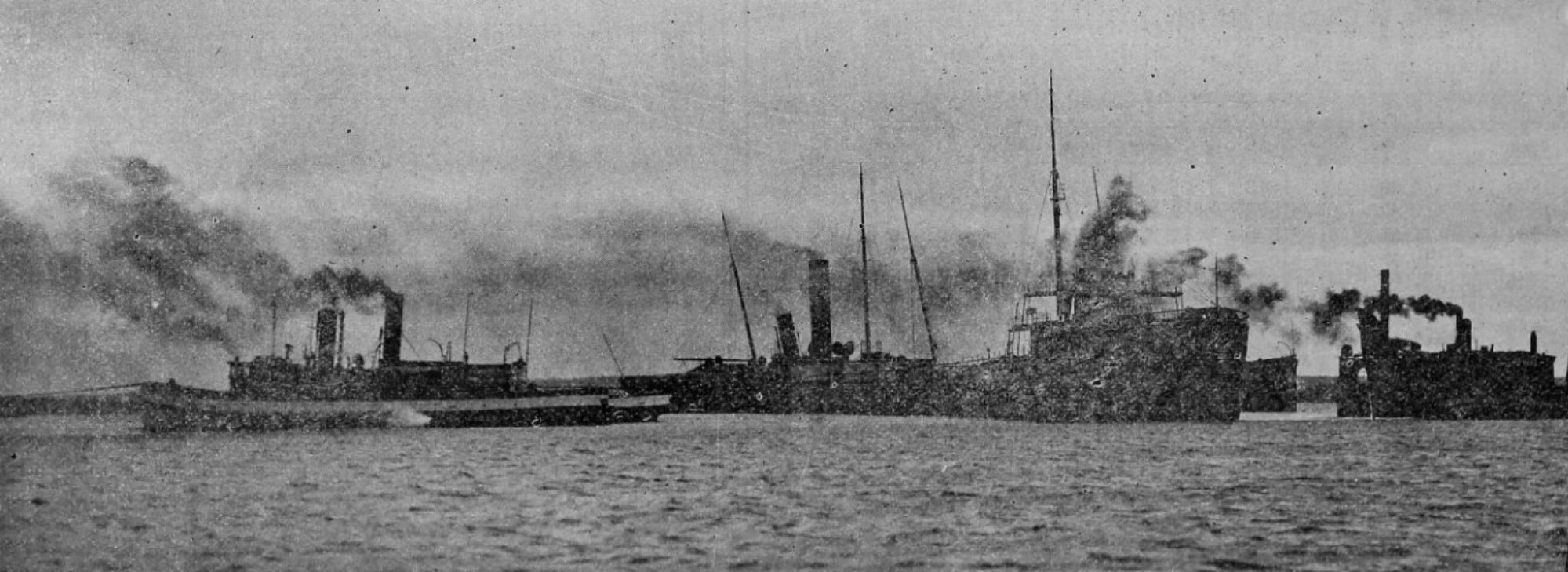
Tugs and a dredge working on Sir William Siemens

On August 13, 1896, the Cleveland based newspaper, The Marine Record, reported that she would probably be delivered to her owners on August 25, 1896. Inland Lloyd's valued her at $240,000 (equivalent to $7.76 million in 2024) and gave her an insurance rating of A1; her home port was Duluth, Minnesota. She was struck by the monitor Andaste while still at the Globe Iron Works Company on the evening on August 20; Sir William Siemens was repaired at a cost $1,500 (equivalent to $48,510 in 2024). Her maiden voyage began when, following a short trial trip, she left Cleveland at night on August 25, passing Detroit, Michigan, after an eight hours at 8:00 a.m.; The Marine Record described her speed as "very unusual for a ship with brand new machinery". Her first cargo was 4,030 long tons (4,095 t) of iron ore, with an average draft of 14 ft 6.5 in (4.4 m). On a trip from Duluth to Buffalo, New York, in November 1896, Sir William Siemens broke the record for the largest cargo of wheat ever carried from a Lake Superior port at 174,500 bushels or 5,235 long tons (5,319 t) of wheat. She broke the record again later in November, hauling 177,000 bushels or 5,310 long tons (5,395 t) of wheat.

On a May 1897 trip between Duluth and Fairport, Ohio, Sir William Siemens broke the record for the largest cargo of iron ore shipped from a Lake Superior port at 5,387 long tons (5,473 t), and with a draft of 16 ft 1 in (5 m). In August that same year, she was warned for violating the rules of the St. Marys River. She struck an obstruction at the north end of Bois Blanc Island near Amherstburg, Ontario, in September 1897. On July 4, 1899, Sir William Siemens struck the wall of the Poe Lock due to a misunderstanding of signals, taking a large piece out of it; she reportedly sustained no damage in the incident.

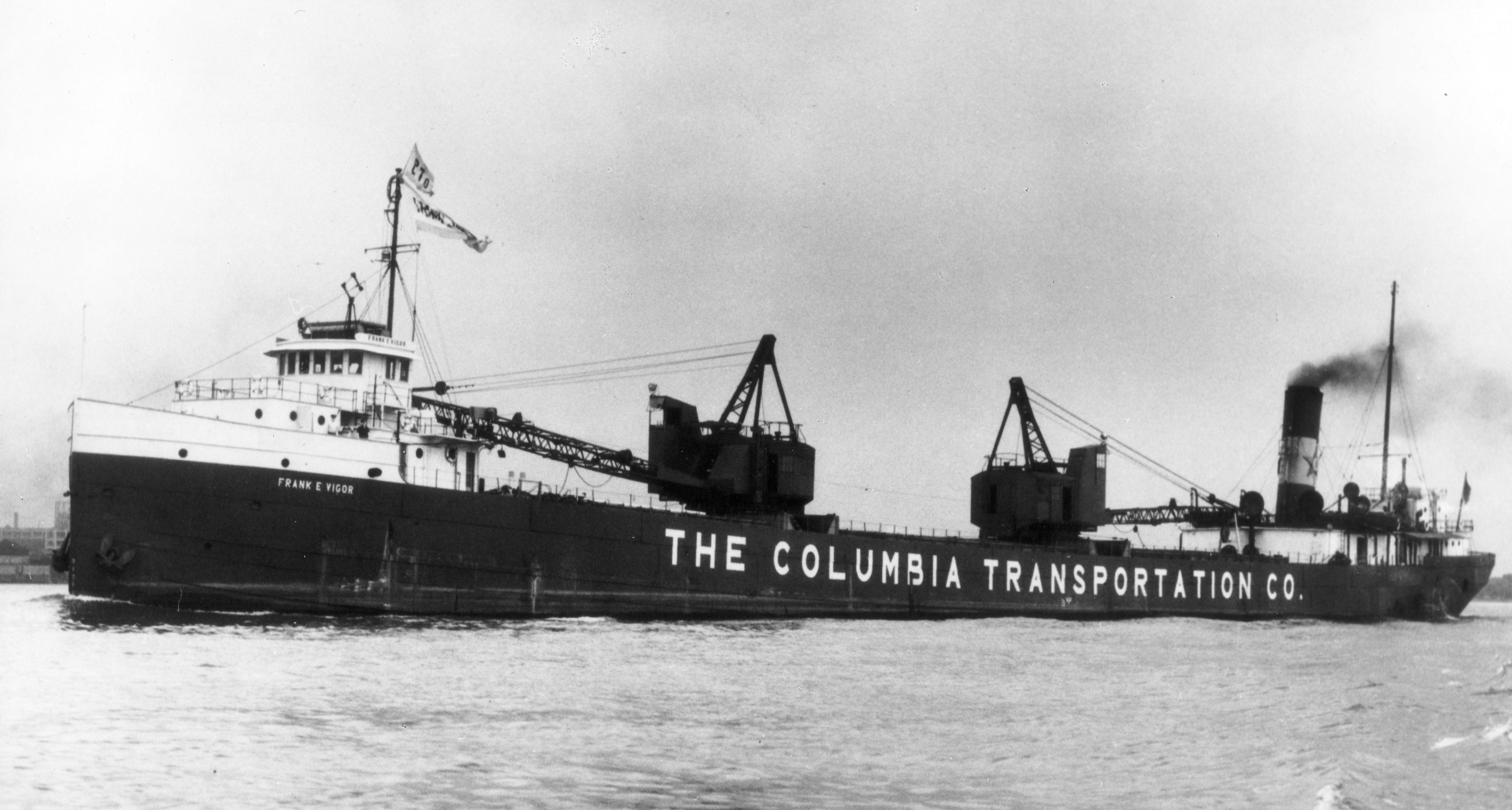
As Frank E. Vigor (1941-1944)

On November 28, 1899, Sir William Siemens was downbound in the St. Marys River with 5,222 long tons (5,306 t) of iron ore on board, and the whaleback barge Alexander Holley in tow; the two vessels had previously been moored at the Fort Brady pier, before proceeding through the Little Rapids cut.

On July 21, 1900, Sir William Siemens loaded 225,000 bushels of corn in South Chicago, Illinois, which was, at the time, one of the largest cargoes of grain taken out of that port.

In 1901, the Bessemer fleet merged into the Pittsburgh Steamship Company. Sir William Siemens was sold to the J. A. Paisley Steamship Company, and was renamed William B. Pilkey. She was sold to the Columbia Transportation Company in 1935, and was renamed Frank E. Vigor in 1941.

=== Final voyage ===
On the morning of April 27, 1944, Frank E. Vigor was traveling on Lake Erie, bound for Buffalo, New York, with a cargo of sulphur. While transiting the Pelee Passage in a thick fog, she collided with the freighter Philip Minch. The Vigor was badly damaged below the waterline, and quickly began to list. Her entire crew was rescued by the Minch, but she eventually capsized and sank.

The wreck of Frank E. Vigor rests upside down in 92 ft (28 m) of water.

== Sources ==
- "A Directory of Names, Pennant Numbers and Addresses of all Members of the Ship Masters' Association of the Great Lakes". Norwalk, Ohio: American Publishers Company. 1915.
- Bowlus, W. Bruce (2010). Iron Ore Transport on the Great Lakes: The Development of a Delivery System to Feed American Industry. Jefferson, North Carolina: McFarland & Company, Inc. ISBN 978-0-786433-26-1. Archived from the original on August 14, 2021.
- "British Whig (Kingston, ON), 1 Jul 1908". British Whig. Kingston, Ontario. 1908.
- Bugbee, Gordon P. (1962a). "Iron Merchant Ships: An Upper Lakes Centennial – Part One" (PDF). Detroit, Michigan: Great Lakes Maritime Institute. Archived (PDF) from the original on July 13, 2021.
- Bugbee, Gordon P. (1962b). "Iron Merchant Ships: An Upper Lakes Centennial – Part Two" (PDF). Detroit, Michigan: Great Lakes Maritime Institute. Archived (PDF) from the original on May 20, 2021.
- "Choctaw Shipwreck Site National Register of Historic Places Registration Form" (PDF). Washington D.C.: National Park Service. 2018. Archived from the original (PDF) on January 1, 2019.
- "Echo Soundings: Marine News of 1897–1898". Amherstburg Echo. Amherstburg, Ontario. 1898.
- "Echo Soundings: Marine News of 1899–1900". Amherstburg Echo. Amherstburg, Ontario. 1900.
- "Frank H. Goodyear (Propeller), U121240, sunk by collision, 23 May 1910". Ontario, Canada: Maritime History of the Great Lakes. 1910.
- Green, Fred W. (1916). "Green's Marine Directory of the Great Lakes, 1916". Cleveland, Ohio.
- Herriman, H. N. (1900). "Great Lakes Register 1900". Cleveland, Ohio: Great Lakes Register.
- Herriman, H. N. (1920). "American Bureau of Shipping, Great Lakes Department, 1920". Cleveland, Ohio: American Bureau of Shipping, Great Lakes Department.
- "Ira H. Owen (Propeller), U100410, sunk, 28 Nov 1905". Ontario, Canada: Maritime History of the Great Lakes. 1905.
- "John Ericsson (Propeller), U77226, aground, 5 Sep 1904". Ontario, Canada: Maritime History of the Great Lakes. 1904.
- Kohl, Cris (2005). The 100 Best Great Lakes Shipwrecks – Volume II. West Chicago, Illinois: Seawolf Communications. ISBN 978-0-9679-9766-7.
- "Siemens, Sir William". Bowling Green, Ohio: Bowling Green State University. 2022.
- "Siemens, Sir William (1896, Bulk Freighter)". Alpena, Michigan: Alpena County George N. Fletcher Public Library. 2022.
- "Sir Henry Bessemer (Propeller), U116723, 9 May 1896". Ontario, Canada: Maritime History of the Great Lakes. 2022.
- "Sir William Siemens (Propeller), U116732, 1 Jul 1896". Ontario, Canada: Maritime History of the Great Lakes. 2022.
- "Sir W. Siemens (Propeller), aground, 10 Dec 1901". Ontario, Canada: Maritime History of the Great Lakes. 2022.
- "Sir William Siemens (Propeller), aground, 8 Dec 1905". Ontario, Canada: Maritime History of the Great Lakes. 1905.
- Smellie, W. R. (1896). "The Inland Lloyds Vessel Register". Cleveland, Ohio.
- "Swallow (Propeller), U115184, sunk by collision, 5 Oct 1900". Ontario, Canada: Maritime History of the Great Lakes. 2022.
- "The Marine Record (Cleveland, OH), 9 Apr 1896". Cleveland, Ohio: The Marine Record. 1896.
- "The Marine Record (Cleveland, OH), 13 Aug 1896". Cleveland, Ohio: The Marine Record. 1896.
- "The Marine Record (Cleveland, OH), 27 Aug 1896". Cleveland, Ohio: The Marine Record. 1896.
- "The Marine Record (Cleveland, OH), 3 Sep 1896". Cleveland, Ohio: The Marine Record. 1896.
- "The Marine Record (Cleveland, OH), 12 Nov 1896". Cleveland, Ohio: The Marine Record. 1896.
- "The Marine Record (Cleveland, OH), 26 Nov 1896". Cleveland, Ohio: The Marine Record. 1896.
- "The Marine Record (Cleveland, OH), 24 Jun 1897". Cleveland, Ohio: The Marine Record. 1897.
- "The Marine Record (Cleveland, OH), 10 Aug 1899". Cleveland, Ohio: The Marine Record. 1899.
- "The Marine Record (Cleveland, OH), 30 Nov 1899". Cleveland, Ohio: The Marine Record. 1899.
- "The Marine Record (Cleveland, OH), 7 Dec 1899". Cleveland, Ohio: The Marine Record. 1899.
- "The Marine Record (Cleveland, OH), 14 Dec 1899". Cleveland, Ohio: The Marine Record. 1899.
- "The Marine Record (Cleveland, OH), 21 Dec 1899". Cleveland, Ohio: The Marine Record. 1899.
- "The Marine Record (Cleveland, OH), 8 Mar 1900". Cleveland, Ohio: The Marine Record. 1900.
- "The Marine Record (Cleveland, OH), 26 Jul 1900". Cleveland, Ohio: The Marine Record. 1900.
- "The Marine Record (Cleveland, OH), 11 Oct 1900". Cleveland, Ohio: The Marine Record. 1900.
- "The Marine Record (Cleveland, OH), 18 Apr 1901". Cleveland, Ohio: The Marine Record. 1901.
- "The Marine Record (Cleveland, OH), 1 Aug 1901". Cleveland, Ohio: The Marine Record. 1901.
- "The Marine Record (Cleveland, OH), 20 Feb 1902". Cleveland, Ohio: The Marine Record. 1902.
- "The Marine Review (Cleveland, OH), 30 Apr 1896". Cleveland, Ohio: The Marine Review. 1896.
- "The Marine Review (Cleveland, OH), 22 Oct 1896". Cleveland, Ohio: The Marine Review. 1896.
- "The Marine Review (Cleveland, OH), 29 Oct 1896". Cleveland, Ohio: The Marine Review. 1896.
- "The Marine Review (Cleveland, OH), 12 Nov 1896". Cleveland, Ohio: The Marine Review. 1896.
- "The Marine Review (Cleveland, OH), 26 Nov 1896". Cleveland, Ohio: The Marine Review. 1896.
- "The Marine Review (Cleveland, OH), 20 May 1897". Cleveland, Ohio: The Marine Review. 1897.
- "The Marine Review (Cleveland, OH), 30 Sep 1897". Cleveland, Ohio: The Marine Review. 1897.
- "The Marine Review (Cleveland, OH), 7 Dec 1899". Cleveland, Ohio: The Marine Review. 1899.
- "The Marine Review (Cleveland, OH), 21 Dec 1899". Cleveland, Ohio: The Marine Review. 1899.
- "The Marine Review (Cleveland, OH), 18 Jan 1900". Cleveland, Ohio: The Marine Review. 1900.
- "The Marine Review (Cleveland, OH), 25 Jan 1900". Cleveland, Ohio: The Marine Review. 1900.
- "The Marine Review (Cleveland, OH), 19 Apr 1900". Cleveland, Ohio: The Marine Review. 1900.
- "The Marine Review (Cleveland, OH), 17 May 1900". Cleveland, Ohio: The Marine Review. 1900.
- "The Marine Review (Cleveland, OH), 10 Jan 1901". Cleveland, Ohio: The Marine Review. 1901.
- "The Marine Review (Cleveland, OH), 11 Apr 1901". Cleveland, Ohio: The Marine Review. 1901.
- "The Marine Review (Cleveland, OH), 7 Dec 1905". Cleveland, Ohio: The Marine Review. 1905.
- "The Marine Review (Cleveland, OH), 3 May 1906". Cleveland, Ohio: The Marine Review. 1906.
- "The Marine Review (Cleveland, OH), 9 Aug 1906". Cleveland, Ohio: The Marine Review. 1906.
- "The Marine Review (Cleveland, OH), 28 Feb 1907". Cleveland, Ohio: The Marine Review. 1907.
- "The Marine Review (Cleveland, OH), 16 May 1907". Cleveland, Ohio: The Marine Review. 1907.
- "The Marine Review (Cleveland, OH), 25 Jul 1907". Cleveland, Ohio: The Marine Review. 1907.
- "The Marine Review (Cleveland, OH), 16 Jan 1908". Cleveland, Ohio: The Marine Review. 1908.
- "The Marine Review (Cleveland, OH), 9 Jul 1908". Cleveland, Ohio: The Marine Review. 1908.
- "The Marine Review (Cleveland, OH), 22 Oct 1908". Cleveland, Ohio: The Marine Review. 1908.
- "The Marine Review (Cleveland, OH), 28 Jan 1909". Cleveland, Ohio: The Marine Review. 1909.
- "The Marine Review (Cleveland, OH), 18 Mar 1909". Cleveland, Ohio: The Marine Review. 1909.
- "The Marine Review (Cleveland, OH), 1 Jan 1914". Cleveland, Ohio: The Marine Review. 1909.
- Thompson, Mark L. (1994). Queen of the Lakes. Detroit, Michigan: Wayne State University Press. ISBN 0-8143-2393-6. Archived from the original on August 14, 2021.
- "W. E. Corey (Propeller), aground, 29 Nov 1905". Ontario, Canada: Maritime History of the Great Lakes. 1905.
