= 1900 Pacific typhoon season =

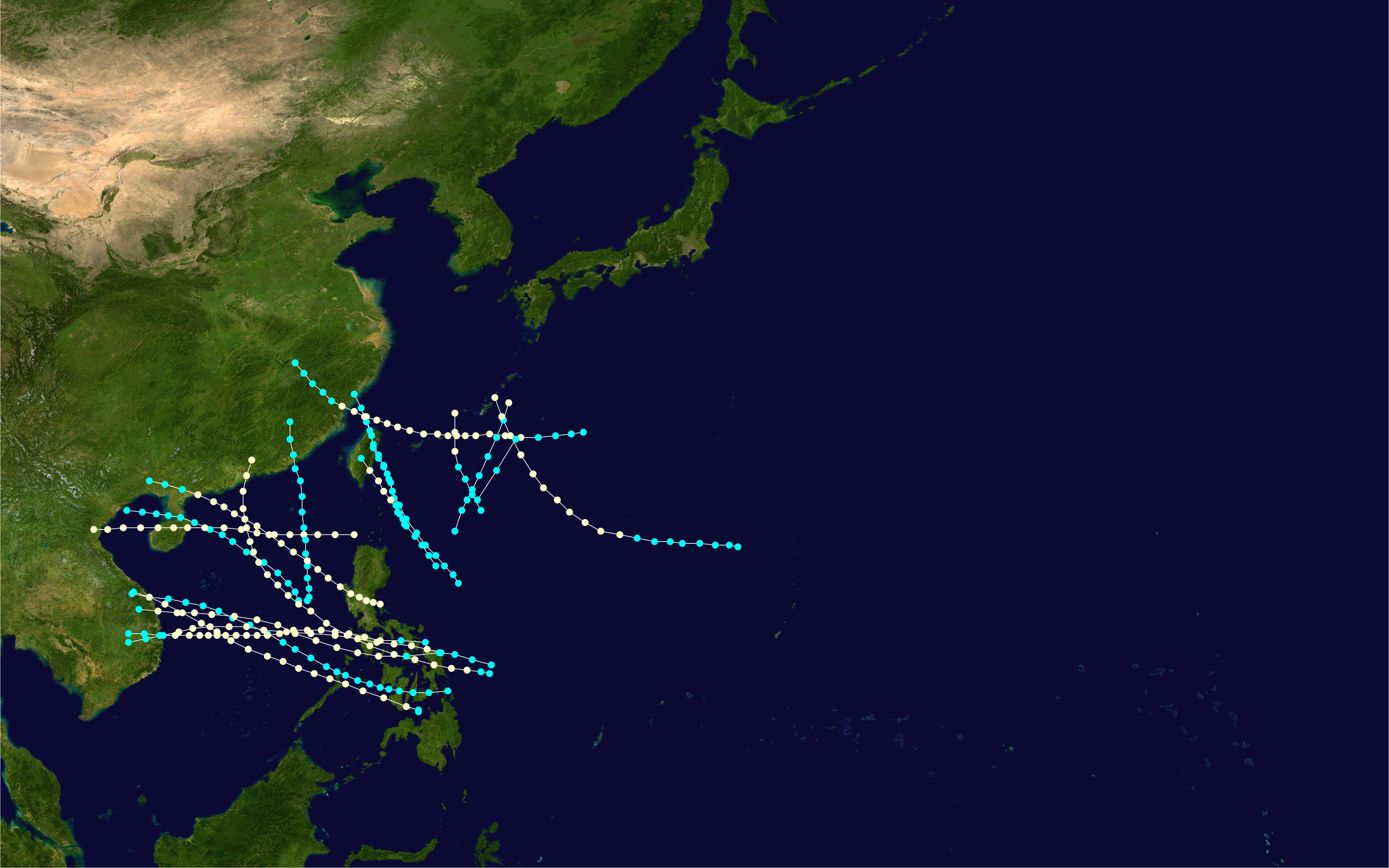
- Season summary map

Seasonal boundaries
- First system formed: January 1900
- Last system dissipated: December 20, 1900

Strongest storm
- Name: Guam typhoon
  - Lowest pressure: 926 hPa (mbar)

Seasonal statistics
- Total storms: 23
- Total fatalities: >1,965 total
- Total damage: Unknown

Related articles
- 1900 Atlantic hurricane season; 1900–09 Pacific hurricane seasons; 1900s North Indian Ocean cyclone seasons

In 1900, 23 tropical cyclones were observed in the western Pacific Ocean, north of the equator and west of the International Date Line. In that region of the world, cyclones that attain maximum sustained winds of at least 118 km/h (73 mph) are known as typhoons. Of the 23 storms, 13 were tracked by the Hong Kong Observatory. Activity occurred from January to December, although the majority of the storms formed from June to November.

In July, a storm moving across Taiwan (then known as Formosa) damaged over 1,000 houses and left 10 fatalities. On August 19, a typhoon moving through western Japan killed 51 people when it wrecked a fishing fleet. In September, another storm in Japan killed three people in Tokyo and one person in Ono. A series of typhoons hit Vietnam (then known as Annam) from September to November, the first of which causing 1,600 deaths when it hit the region on September 29. A late-season storm hit Hong Kong on November 10, catching residents off guard, capsizing 270 boats, and killing over 200 people. On November 13, Guam was hit by its most intense typhoon on record, recording a minimum barometric pressure of 923 mbar (27.3 inHg). The powerful winds wrecked nearly all of the island's crops and decimated several small towns, resulting in over 100 deaths.

== January–August ==
Two storms were reported during January, and another developed in March.

On June 19, a storm was observed in the South China Sea and dissipated on June 23 after moving ashore southern China. The next system was observed on July 2 to the east of the Philippines, which moved northwestward and dissipated north of Taiwan on July 6 after striking the island the day prior near Taitung City. Across the island, at least 130 houses were destroyed, and another 875 were damaged, killing 10 people. The overflown Tamsui River wrecked several bridges and boats near Tamsui.

Four tropical cyclones were observed in August. A tropical cyclone was observed on August 13 to the east of the Philippines, south of Okinawa. The storm moved northeastward through the Ryukyu Islands, spurring storm warnings on August 18 for the main islands of Japan. On the next day, the typhoon moved across Kyushu and Shikoku into the Sea of Japan. At Miyazaki, a pressure of 956 mbar (28.2 inHg) was recorded. The cyclone brought 53 mm (2.1 in) of rainfall to Kyushu, spreading as far east as Tokyo, which caused flooding and disrupted railway service. High waves affected Ujina and Hiroshima, with a 2 ft (0.61 m) storm surge at the latter location. The winds knocked down telegraph lines west of Hiroshima, and caused the price of tobacco to rise because of damage to the crop. In Ehime Prefecture, the cyclone struck a fleet of fishing boats, killing 51 people, leaving 13 missing, and with 20 others rescued.

Along the western coast of what is now Albay in the Philippines, a typhoon wrecked a ship on August 17. The crew assisted passengers into rescue boats, although they had to wait an additional six days until they were rescued by another ship. No one was injured in the wreckage. On August 18, a storm was observed moving northwestward toward the Ryukyu Islands, where it was last noted on August 23. Northwest of Luzon on August 19, a tropical cyclone was observed. Moving westward, the system moved across the Chinese island of Hainan on August 21. All ships were evacuated in the harbor at Macau due to the storm. After crossing the Gulf of Tonkin, the cyclone dissipated upon striking Vietnam on August 23. On the same day, another storm was observed northeast of Luzon. The new cyclone tracked north-northwestward, hitting Taiwan on August 26. It continued and dissipated over the southeastern mainland of China. Another new cyclone existed from August 25–29, originating west of Luzon and moving northward until its dissipation over southern China.

== September–December ==
=== Vietnam storms ===
A series of five storms affected the Philippines from September to November.

A tropical cyclone developed over the southern Philippines on September 23. It moved through the Visayas and crossed Palawan into the South China Sea on a northwest trajectory. Curving to the west, the storm dissipated after moving making landfall southeast of Danang (then known as Tourane), Vietnam, on September 29. The storm killed 1,600 people and left another 4,500 people homeless. 48 hours of strong winds destroyed rice fields and many buildings.

Another tropical cyclone developed over the Philippines on September 29, moving west-northwestward across Palawan into the South China Sea. On October 4, the storm moved ashore Vietnam near Danang, dissipating shortly thereafter. On October 5, a tropical cyclone was first observed near Samar, Philippines. Moving westward through the archipelago, the storm crossed the South China Sea and dissipated over Vietnam on October 9, having struck Quảng Ngãi. A similar storm was first observed on October 12. The system also moved westward across the South China Sea, striking eastern Vietnam near Sông Cầu on October 17. It dissipated the next day. Along the Vietnam coast, the storm left heavy damage several miles inland, decimating coffee and tea plantations. Another storm originated on October 30 east of Samar, and like many other storms in the season, moved westward through the Philippines and across the South China Sea. It struck Sông Cầu along eastern Vietnam on November 3, dissipating the next day.

=== Hong Kong typhoon ===
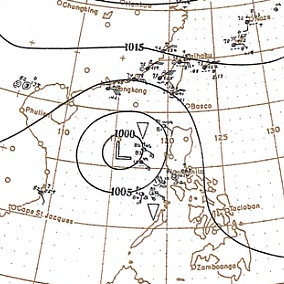
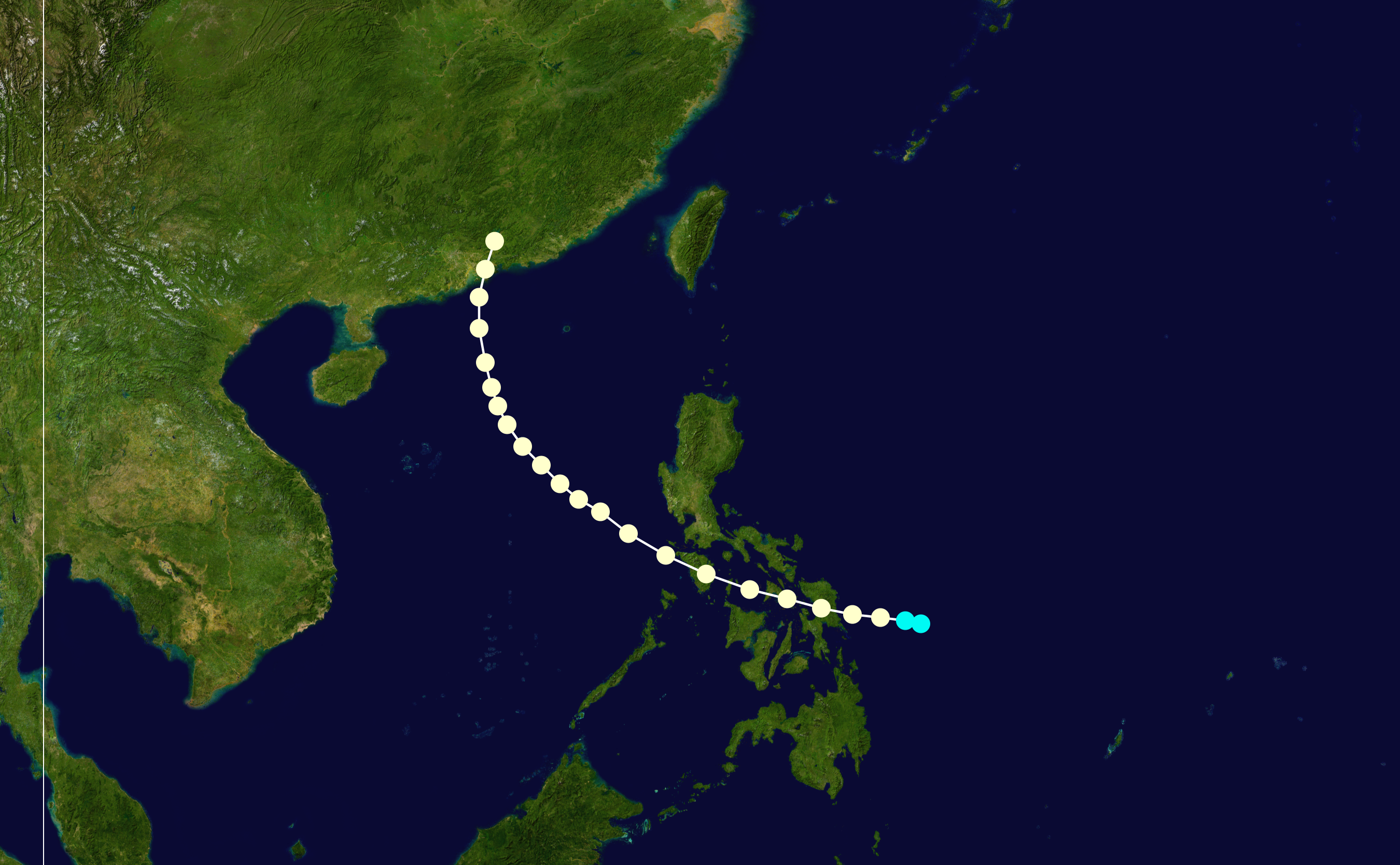
- Duration: November 4 – November 10
- Peak intensity: Winds not specified; 975 hPa (mbar)

A tropical cyclone was first observed east of the Philippines on November 4. It moved through the Philippines and curved to the northwest and later north in the South China Sea. The typhoon had a diameter up to 1,000 km (620 mi) wide, prompting the Hong Kong Observatory to issue a warning signal on November 8. Two days later, the system moved over eastern Hong Kong, producing peak winds of 113 km/h (70 mph) and a minimum pressure of 974.9 mbar (28.79 inHg); this remains the lowest pressure reading for the month of November. As the storm arrived late in the year, many residents did not heed the warnings, as the gunshot to mark the warning did not occur due to weapon malfunction. The storm was known as the Geng-Zi typhoon disaster, due to 1900 being known as the "Geng-Zi" year. The storm dissipated late on November 10 over southern China.

A rare November typhoon, the storm produced severe waves that damaged and sank 270 boats in Hong Kong's harbor, including a British gunboat and a dredge. Portuguese ships in the region assisted crew members whose ships were damaged, and ship builders filled many orders in 1901 to compensate for the lost ships. High waves also damaged a Star Ferry pier. In Yau Ma Tei, the high winds damaged every shed built on reclaimed land, and many houses were damaged throughout Hong Kong. Along the Queen's Road, several buildings collapsed, killing eight. Many trees, lamps, and telephone posts were knocked down. The storm killed more than 200 people in Hong Kong, causing the most damage of any storm there since a typhoon in 1874. High winds were also reported in nearby Macau, although there was no serious damage there.

=== Guam typhoon ===
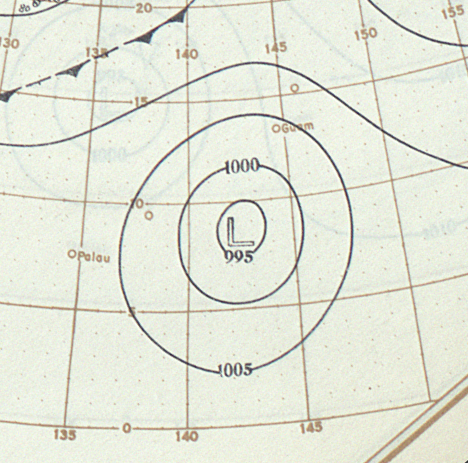
- Duration: <November 13 – >November 13
- Peak intensity: Winds not specified; 926 hPa (mbar)

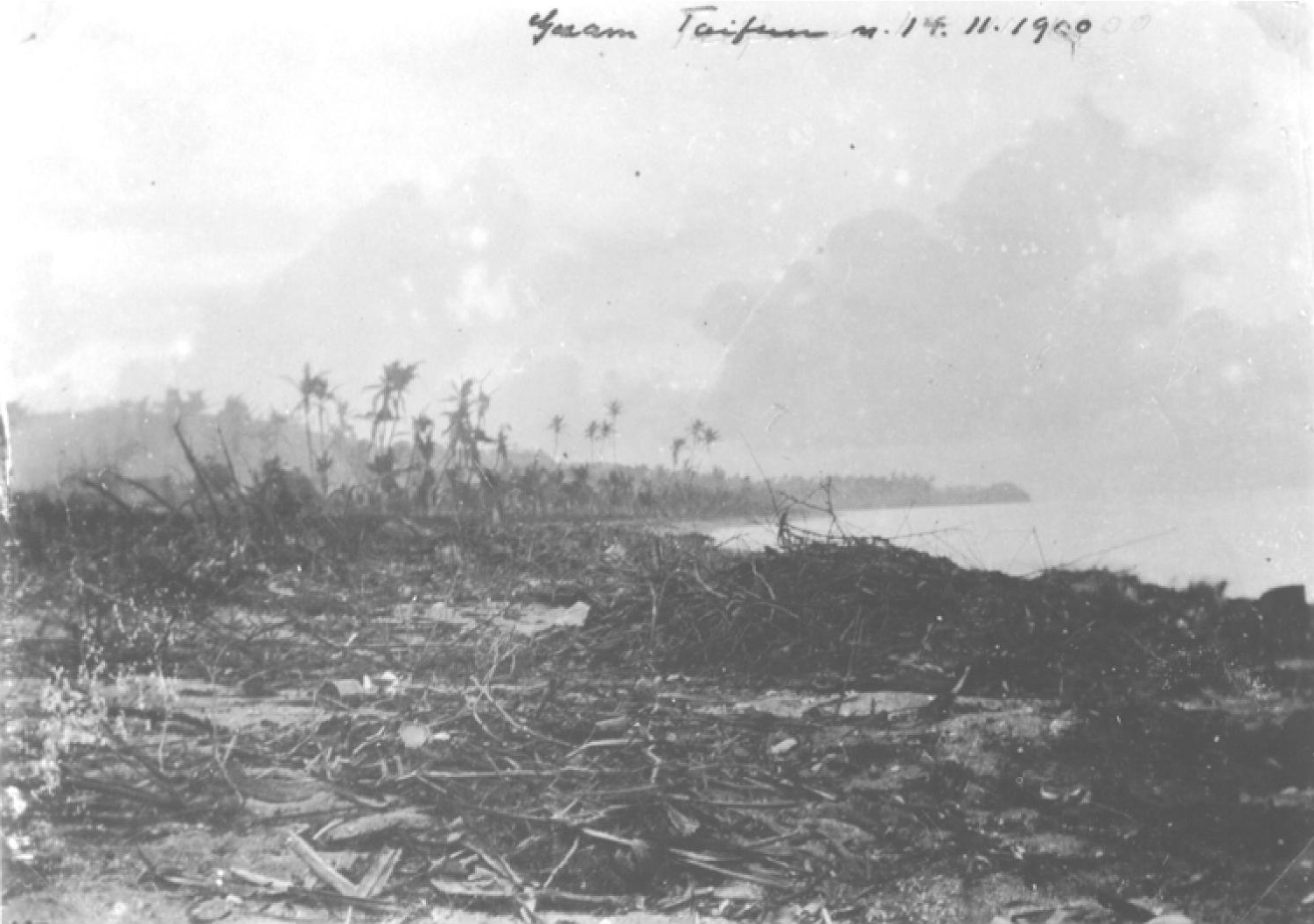
Aftermath of November 1900 typhoon on Guam

On November 13, a typhoon struck Guam, accompanied by a 3.7 m (12 ft) storm surge, inundating Hagåtña and Inarajan. A pressure of 926 mbar (27.3 inHg) was recorded on the island, the most intense Guam typhoon on record, and the severest in 40 years. Several towns were entirely destroyed, and 100 people were killed. Many government buildings, including the Plaza de España, lost their roofs and were damaged. The USS Yosemite, docked at Apra Harbor, was damaged when strong waves pushed the ship into reefs, damaging the propeller and rudder. The crew evacuated after drifting for 36 hours, salvaging any valuables before deliberately sinking the damaged Yosemite. Five crew members died on the ship. Those left homeless by the storm resided in schools and jails in the weeks after the storm, and many people died of the flu due to residing in their damaged houses. Nearly all of the island's crops were destroyed, forcing the government to distribute food to the island's residents. It took two years for the island's coconut trees to regrow.

=== Other systems ===
Four storms were observed, one in each month from September to November, and an additional two storms were observed in December.

A tropical cyclone developed between Guam and the western Caroline Islands on September 1. It moved west-northwestward, striking Luzon near Nueva Ecija on September 7. The storm crossed the island and emerged into the South China Sea on the next day. On September 11, the typhoon made landfall in southern China southeast of Maoming, dissipating the next day. High winds and tides damaged the Praia Grande in Macau.

On September 11, a tropical cyclone was observed south of Japan, moving westward. It moved westward through the Ryukyu Islands, where a pressure of 985 mbar (29.1 inHg) was recorded, and many houses were damaged. The storm later passed north of Taiwan (then known as Formosa), killing several people. The Tamsui River overflowed due to the typhoon, which flooded 922 houses around Taipei. A ship was washed ashore, and rail traffic was interrupted. The cyclone later moved ashore mainland China near Wenzhou on September 15, dissipating two days later. The remnants spread northward across the Korean peninsula.

On September 24, a storm was observed southeast of Okinawa. Two days later, the storm passed between Miyakojima and Okinawa. On September 27, the typhoon passed near Ōshima and continued quickly northward, striking mainland Japan near Shizuoka. A minimum pressure of 987 mbar (29.1 inHg) was recorded offshore southern Kyushu. After bypassing Tokyo on September 28, the storm emerged into the open ocean near Sendai. Most of Japan was affected by the strong winds disrupting communications. Near Yokohama, winds knocked down signs and power lines while also causing roof damage. In Kobe, 68 houses were destroyed, along with several factories, were 80 boats were lost. Hundreds of trees were knocked down, one of which killed a man in Ono. At the Sadamisaki Peninsula along the western tip of Shikoku, rainfall reached 100 mm (3.9 in), and floods reached knee-deep in Tokyo. Three people died in the city; one due to a fallen tree, another due to a damaged chimney, and the other due to a wrecked roof.

On October 18, a storm was observed east of northern Luzon. Moving northwestward, it struck and dissipated over Taiwan on October 21.

From November 15–16, a tropical cyclone was moving northeastward to the south of Okinawa. On December 8, a typhoon was observed east of the Visayas island group of the Philippines. It moved westward, crossing Leyte, and accelerated to the northeast. The storm was last observed on December 12. Several boats were washed ashore or wrecked during the storm. The final storm of the season persisted southeast of Guam from December 13–20. Possibly related to it was a typhoon that was first observed at the low latitude of 4º N southeast of Palau.

== See also ==
- 1900 Atlantic hurricane season
- 1900–09 Pacific hurricane seasons
- 1900s North Indian Ocean cyclone seasons
