= 1900 =

1900 in various calendars
- Gregorian calendar: 1900; MCM
- Ab urbe condita: 2653
- Armenian calendar: 1349; ԹՎ ՌՅԽԹ
- Assyrian calendar: 6650
- Baháʼí calendar: 56–57
- Balinese saka calendar: 1821–1822
- Bengali calendar: 1306–1307
- Berber calendar: 2850
- British Regnal year: 63 Vict. 1 – 64 Vict. 1
- Buddhist calendar: 2444
- Burmese calendar: 1262
- Byzantine calendar: 7408–7409
- Chinese calendar: 己亥年 (Earth Pig); 4597 or 4390 — to — 庚子年 (Metal Rat); 4598 or 4391
- Coptic calendar: 1616–1617
- Discordian calendar: 3066
- Ethiopian calendar: 1892–1893
- Hebrew calendar: 5660–5661
- Hindu calendars
- Vikram Samvat: 1956–1957
- Shaka Samvat: 1821–1822
- Kali Yuga: 5000–5001
- Holocene calendar: 11900
- Igbo calendar: 900–901
- Iranian calendar: 1278–1279
- Islamic calendar: 1317–1318
- Japanese calendar: Meiji 33 (明治３３年)
- Javanese calendar: 1829–1830
- Julian calendar: Gregorian minus 12 or 13 days
- Korean calendar: 4233
- Minguo calendar: 12 before ROC 民前12年
- Nanakshahi calendar: 432
- Thai solar calendar: 2442–2443
- Tibetan calendar: ས་མོ་ཕག་ལོ་ (female Earth-Boar); 2026 or 1645 or 873 — to — ལྕགས་ཕོ་བྱི་བ་ལོ་ (male Iron-Rat); 2027 or 1646 or 874

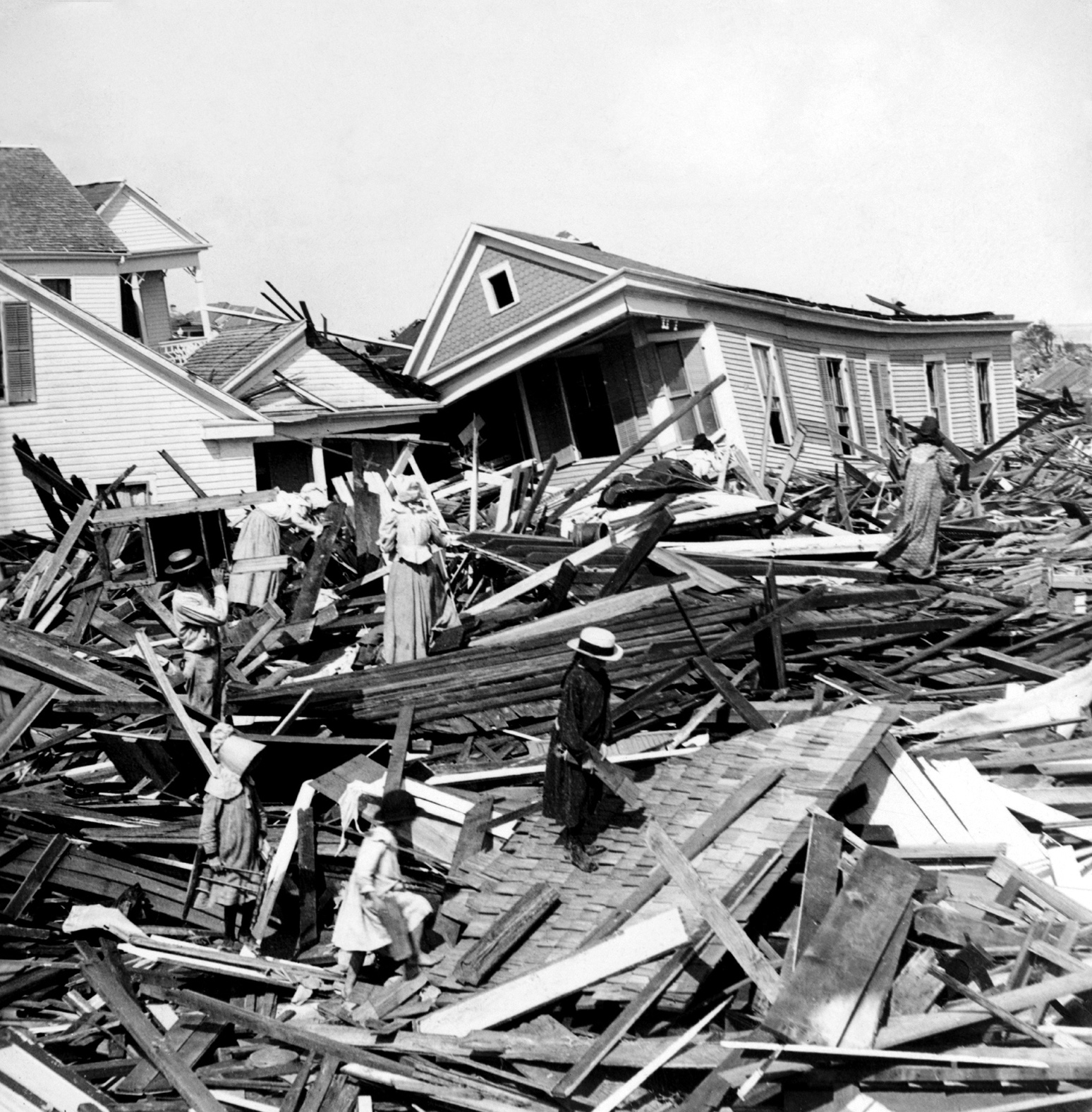
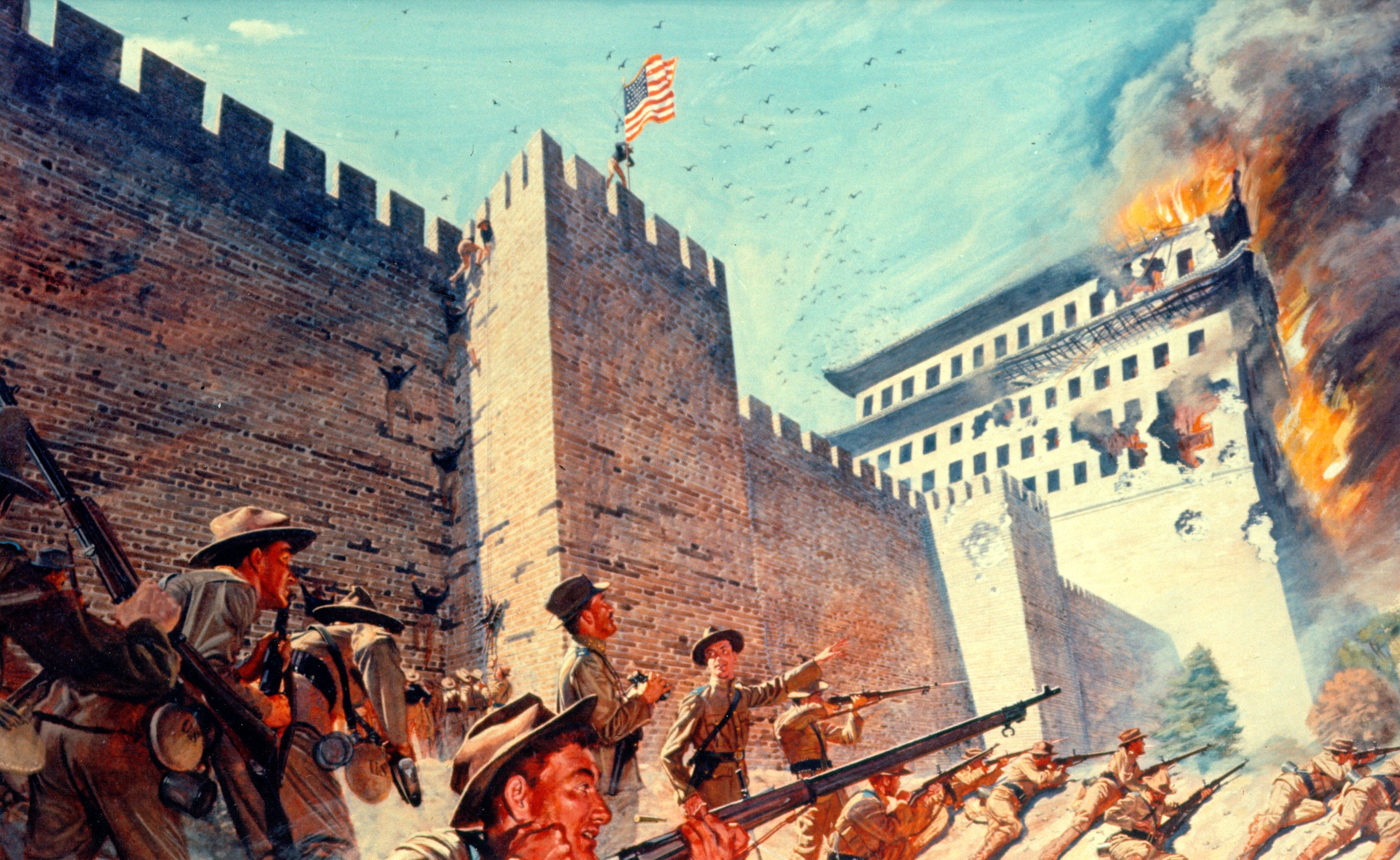
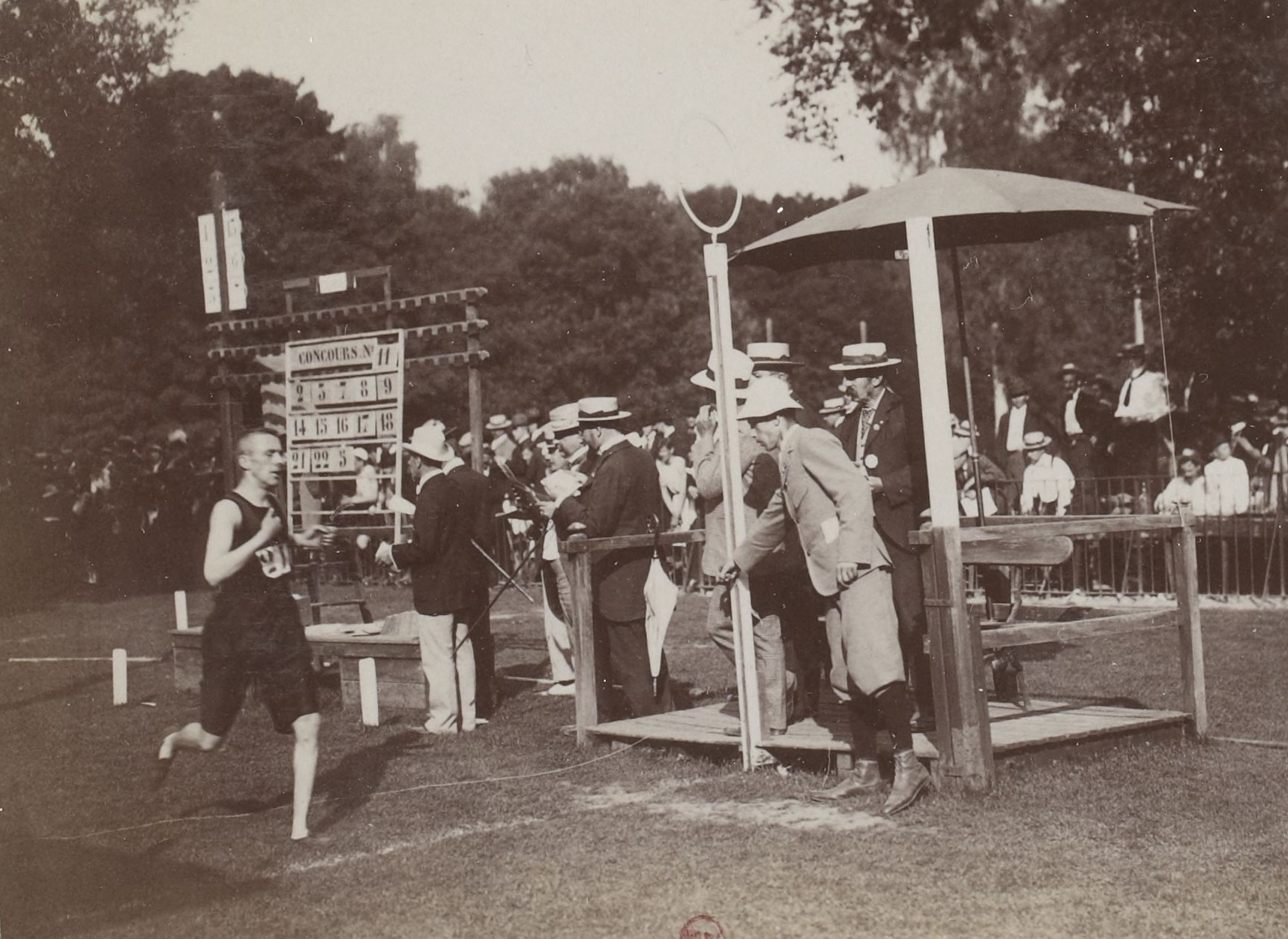
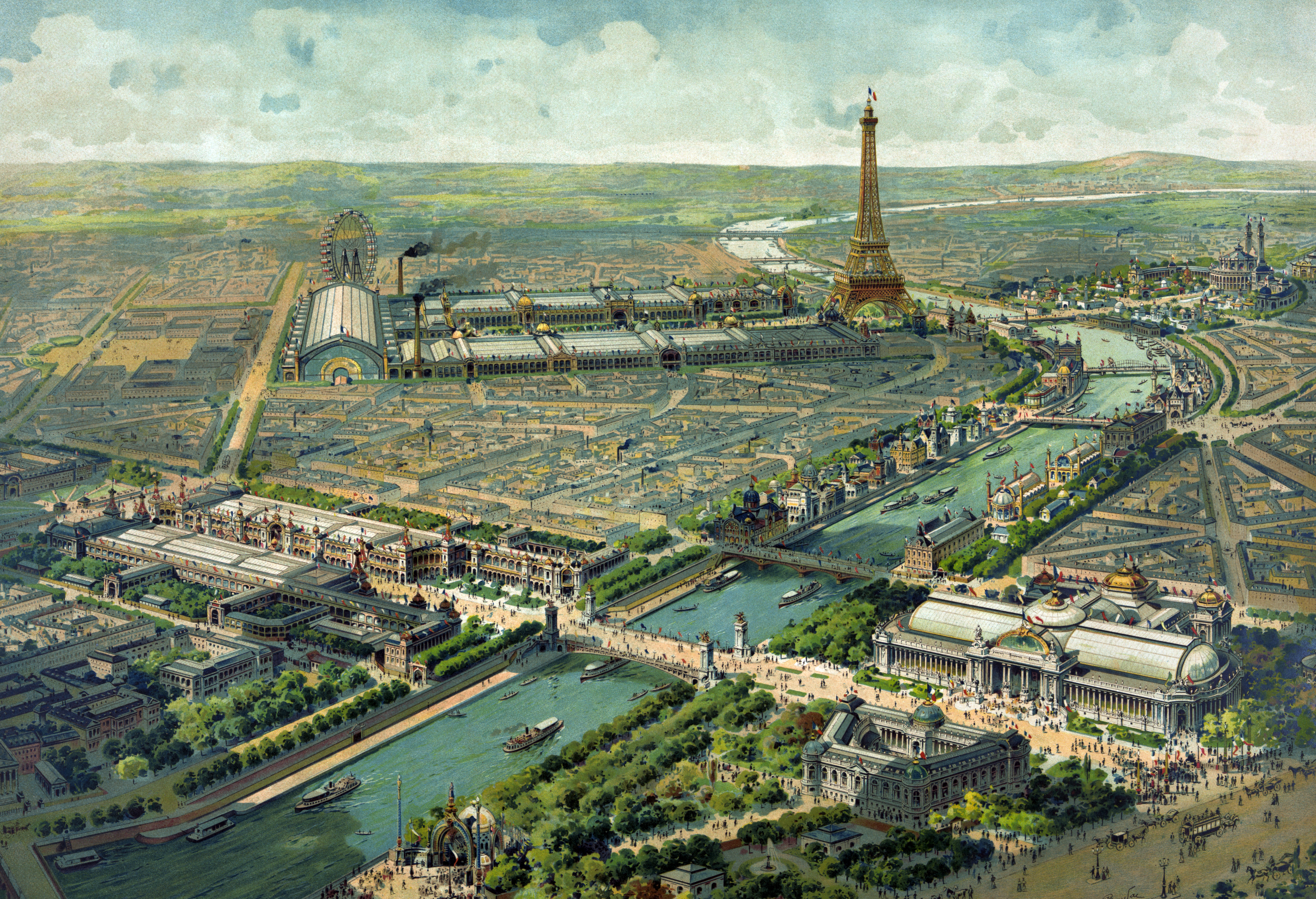
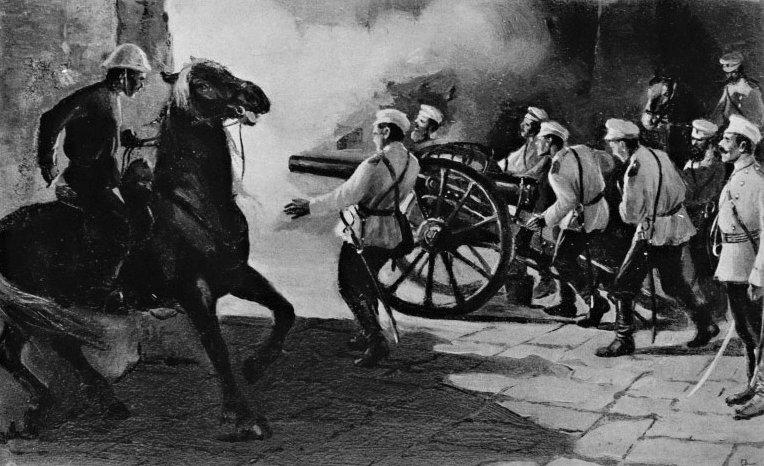
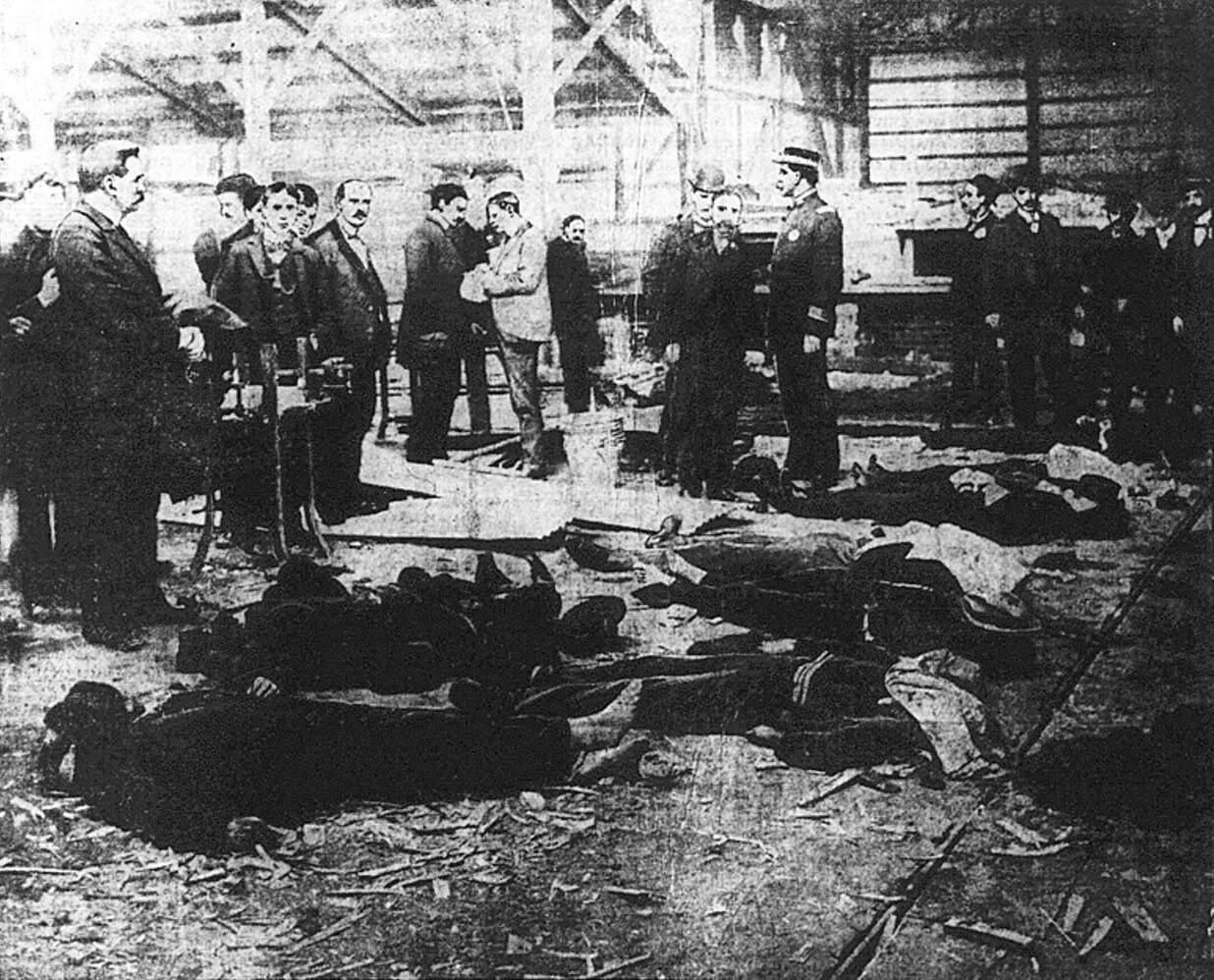
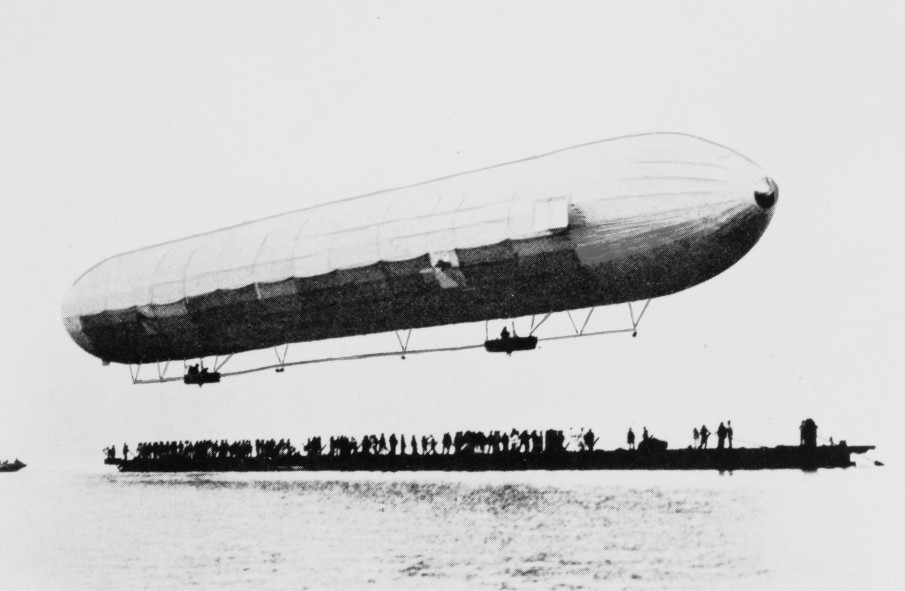
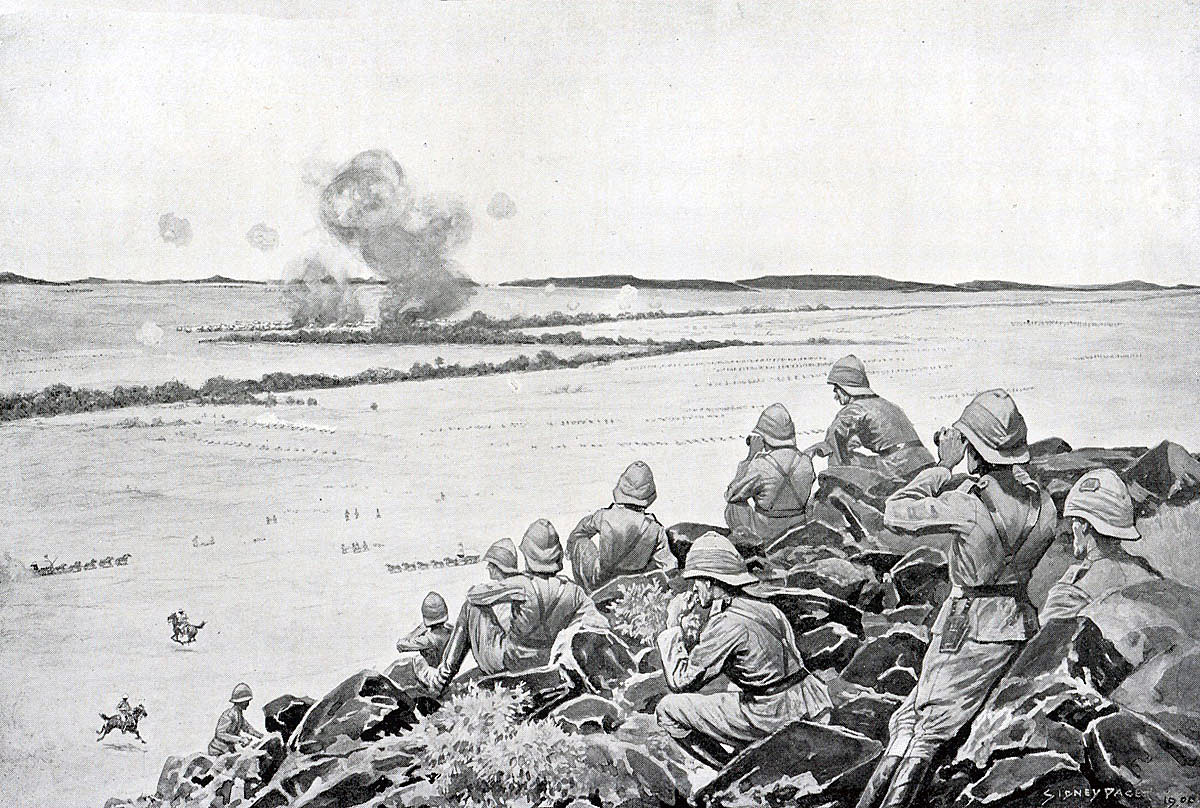
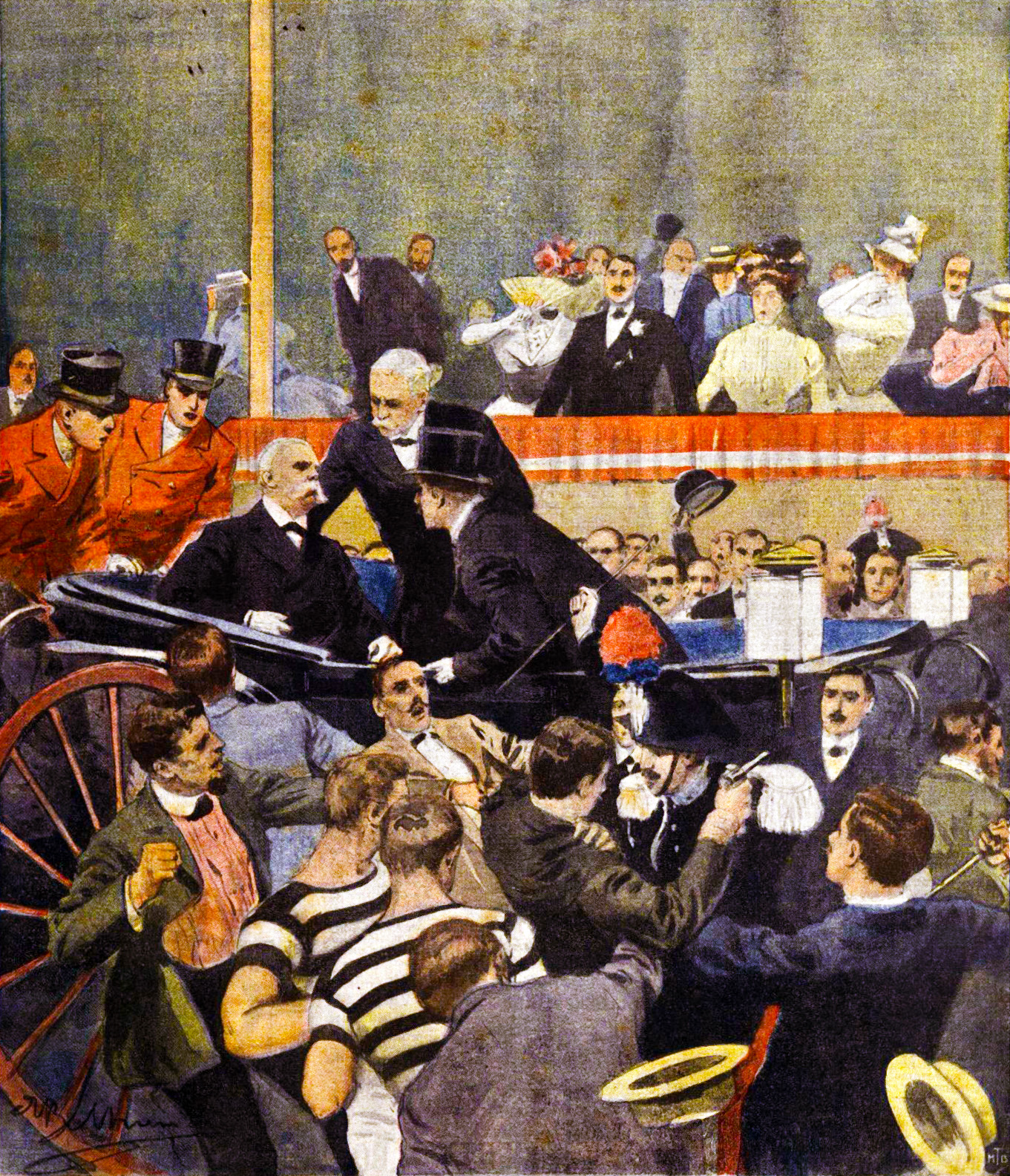
From top to bottom, left to right:
- The Galveston hurricane devastates Texas, killing about 8,000 people;
- The Siege of the International Legations becomes the climax of the Boxer Rebellion;
- The 1900 Summer Olympics are held in Paris;
- The Exposition Universelle showcases innovation in Paris;
- The Russian invasion of Manchuria heightens tensions in East Asia;
- The Thanksgiving Day Disaster kills 23 during San Francisco's Big Game;
- The Zeppelin LZ 1 makes its first flight;
- The Battle of Paardeberg marks a major Second Boer War victory;
- Umberto I of Italy is assassinated.

1900 (MCM) was a century common year starting on Monday of the Gregorian calendar and a leap year starting on Saturday of the Julian calendar, the 1900th year of the Common Era (CE) and Anno Domini (AD) designations, the 900th year of the 2nd millennium, the 100th and last year of the 19th century, and the 1st year of the 1900s decade. As of the start of 1900, the Gregorian calendar was 12 days ahead of the Julian calendar, which remained in localized use until 1923.

As of March 1 (O.S. February 17), when the Julian calendar acknowledged a leap day and the Gregorian calendar did not, the Julian calendar fell one day farther behind, bringing the difference to 13 days until February 28 (O.S. February 15), 2100.

== Summary ==
=== Political and military ===
The year 1900 was the end of the 19th century and the beginning of the 20th century. Two days into the new year, the U.S. Secretary of State John Hay announced the Open Door Policy regarding China, advocating for equal access for all nations to the Chinese market. The Galveston hurricane would become the deadliest natural disaster in United States history, killing between 6,000 and 12,000 people, mostly in and near Galveston, Texas, as well as leaving 10,000 people homeless, destroying 7,000 buildings of all kinds in Galveston. As of 2025, it remains the fourth deadliest Atlantic hurricane on record. An ongoing Boxer Rebellion in China escalates with multiple attacks by the Boxers on Chinese and European civilians, killing hundreds; the rebellion would progress with the Russian Empire's invasion of Manchuria and the Battle of Peking (1900). During the Scramble for Africa, the Battle of Kousséri would see French forces secure their domination of Chad, which would become a French colony. Britain would annex the South African Republic and the Orange Free State in Southern Africa, becoming the Orange River Colony until 1910.

For Britain, developments such as the Battle of Platrand, Battle of Spion Kop and the Battle of Paardeberg in the Second Boer War highlighted the harsh nature of Boer guerrilla tactics. The British Labour Party was founded in 1900, emerging out of the Labour movement and socialist parties of the 19th century; it would go on to become a major political force in Britain after the First World War. The Federation of Australia is enacted, marking the unification of its colonies into a single country.

=== Science ===
Four main scientific discoveries were achieved in the year 1900:

1. Max Planck formulates Planck's law of black-body radiation, marking the birth of modern quantum mechanics, which would revolutionize humanity's understanding of the universe, leading to groundbreaking discoveries in technology, energy, and the fabric of reality itself.
2. Botanist Hugo de Vries would rediscover Mendel's laws of heredity, laying the foundation for the field of genetics.
3. The ABO blood group system, which becomes fundamental in transfusion medicine is discovered by Karl Landsteiner, saving countless numbers of lives across the globe.
4. Gamma Rays are discovered by French physicist Paul Villard, while studying uranium decay, unveiling the mystery of the universe's most powerful phenomena and marking an important advancement in nuclear physics.

=== Cultural and artistic ===
Giacomo Puccini's opera Tosca premiers, one of the most frequently performed operas worldwide, a melodramatic piece set in Rome in June 1800, with the Kingdom of Naples's control of Rome threatened by Napoleon's invasion of Italy. It contains depictions of torture, murder, and suicide, as well as some of Puccini's best-known lyrical arias.

L. Frank Baum, an American author, publishes The Wonderful Wizard of Oz, a cornerstone of American children's literature, marking the first book of the Oz series.

=== Miscellaneous ===
The U.S. Senate accepts the British-German Treaty of 1899 on January 14. This formally ended U.S. claims to the Samoan Islands. The U.S.-UK Treaty for a Central American Canal would be signed on February 5. While the initial plan for a Nicaraguan canal did not materialize, this treaty laid the groundwork for the construction of the Panama Canal, a project of immense geopolitical and economic importance.

The year 1900 also marked the Year of the Rat on the Chinese calendar.

== Events ==
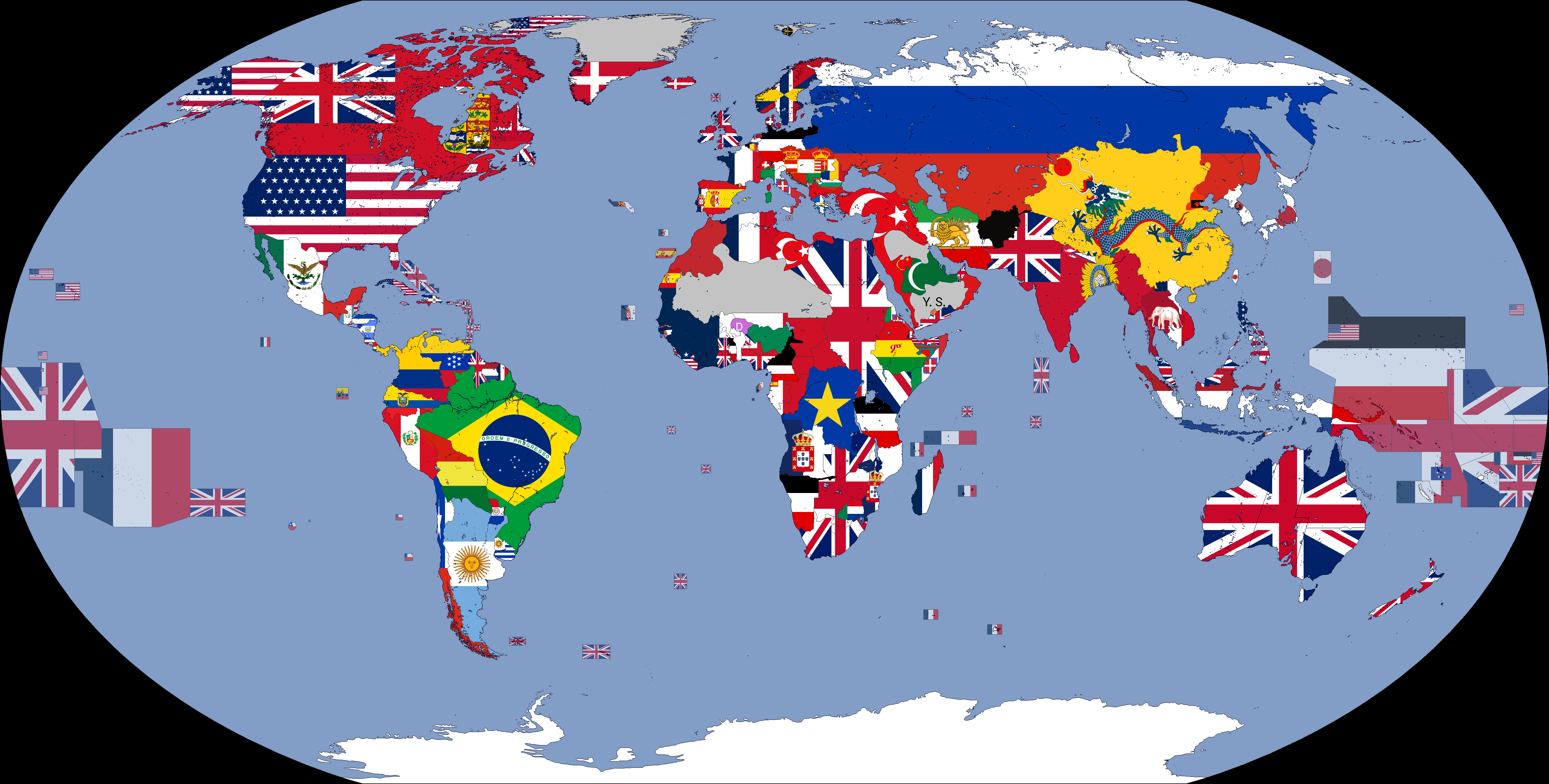
The world in the year 1900

=== January ===
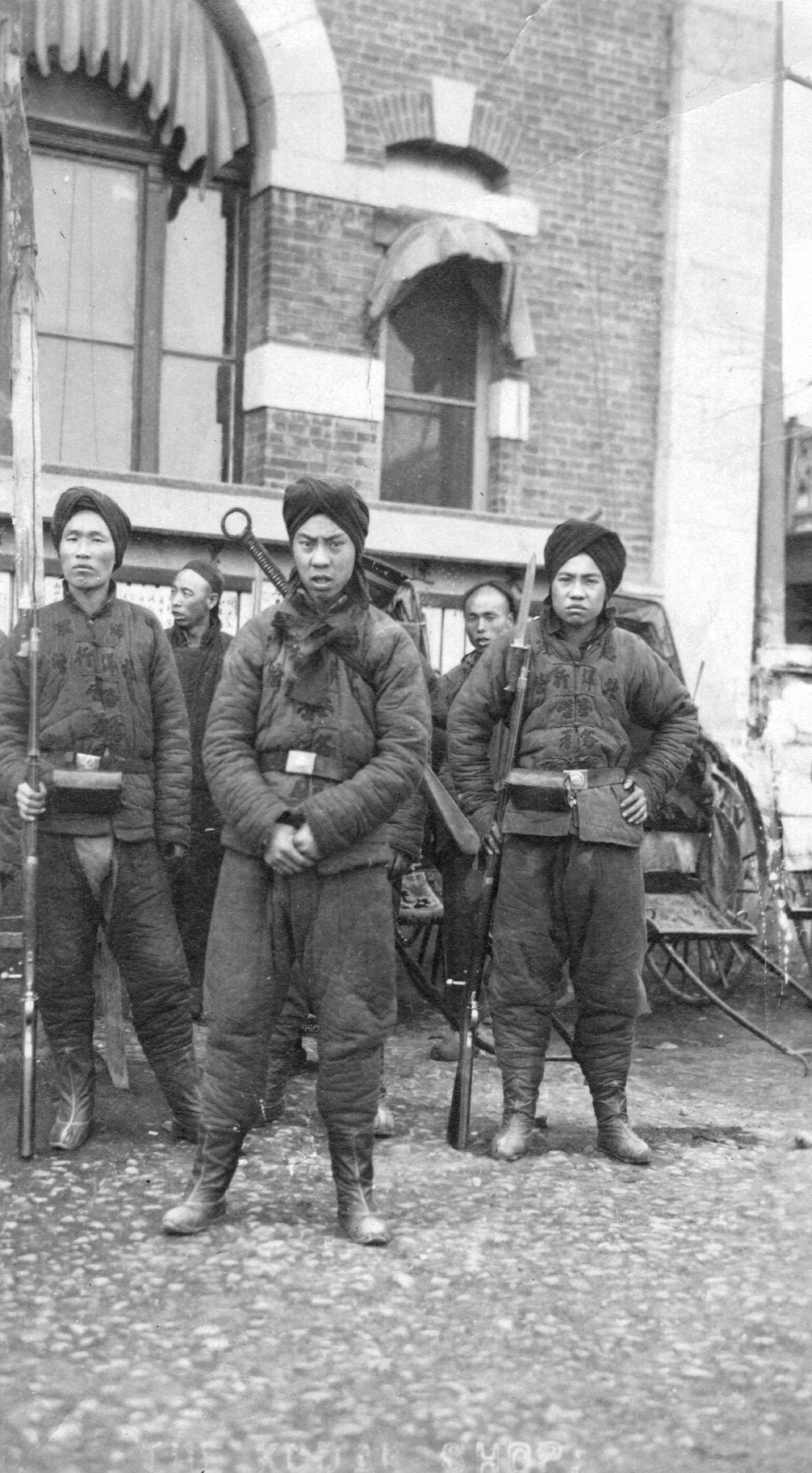
Boxer soldiers

- c. January – The first Michelin Guide is published for French motorists.
- January 2 – U.S. Secretary of State John Hay announces the Open Door Policy to promote American trade with China.
- January 6 – Second Boer War: Boers attempt to end the Siege of Ladysmith, which leads to the Battle of Platrand.
- January 14
  - Puccini's opera Tosca premieres in Rome.
  - The U.S. Senate accepts the British-German Treaty of 1899, in which the United Kingdom renounces its claims to the American Samoa portion of the Samoan Islands.

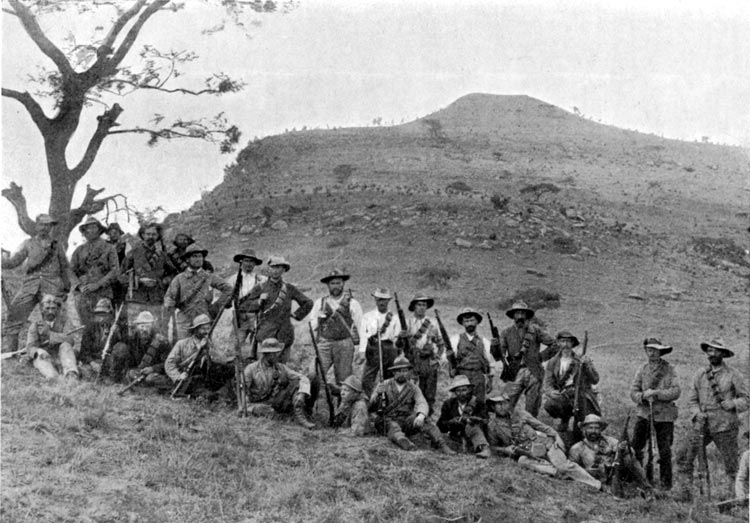
Second Boer War: Boers at Spion Kop

- January 24 – Second Boer War: Battle of Spion Kop – Boer troops defeat the British Army.
- January 27 – Boxer Rebellion: Foreign diplomats in Peking, Qing dynasty China, demand that the Boxer rebels (who oppose foreign interests in the country) be disciplined.
- January 31 – Datu Muhammad Salleh, leader of the Mat Salleh Rebellion in North Borneo, is shot dead in Tambunan.

=== February ===
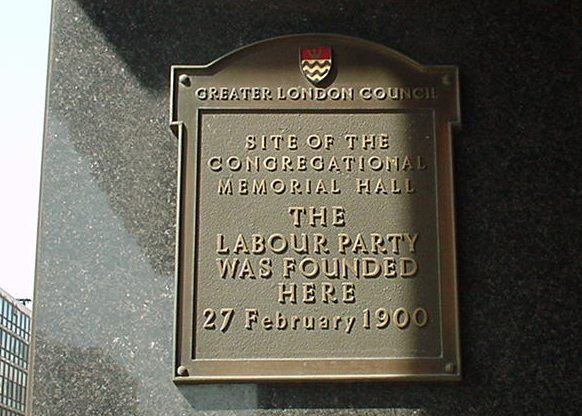
Plaque recording the location of the formation of the British Labour Party in 1900.

- February 5 – The United Kingdom and the United States sign a treaty for the building of a Central American shipping canal across Central America in Nicaragua.
- February 6 – The International Arbitration Court at The Hague is created, when the Netherlands' Senate ratifies an 1899 peace conference decree.
- February 8 – Second Boer War: British troops defeat the Boers at Ladysmith, South Africa.
- February 15 – Second Boer War: The Siege of Kimberley is lifted.
- February 16 – The British-sponsored Southern Cross Expedition led by Carsten Borchgrevink achieves a new Farthest South of 78° 50'S, making the first landing at the Great Ice Barrier.
- February 17 – Second Boer War: Battle of Paardeberg – British troops defeat the Boers.
- February 27
  - The British Labour Party is officially established, at a meeting in the Congregational Memorial Hall in London, and Ramsay MacDonald is appointed as its first secretary.
  - Second Boer War: British military leaders accept the unconditional notice of surrender from Boer General Piet Cronjé.
  - FC Bayern, Germany's most successful football club, is founded in Munich.

=== March ===
- March 5 – Two U.S. Navy cruisers are sent to Central America to protect American interests in a dispute between Nicaragua and Costa Rica.
- March 6 – A coal mine explosion in West Virginia, United States, kills 50 miners.
- March 14 – Botanist Hugo de Vries rediscovers Mendel's laws of heredity.
- March 16 – British archaeologist Sir Arthur Evans purchases the land on Crete on which the ruins of the Palace of Knossos stand. He begins to unearth some of the palace three days later.
- March 20 — Thomas Lambert received a patent for the first indestructible type of cylinder records.
- March 23 – Karl Landsteiner first reports his discovery of an accurate means for classifying a system of blood type, which will universally be referred to as the ABO blood group system and for which he will be awarded the Nobel Prize in Physiology or Medicine in 1930.

=== April ===
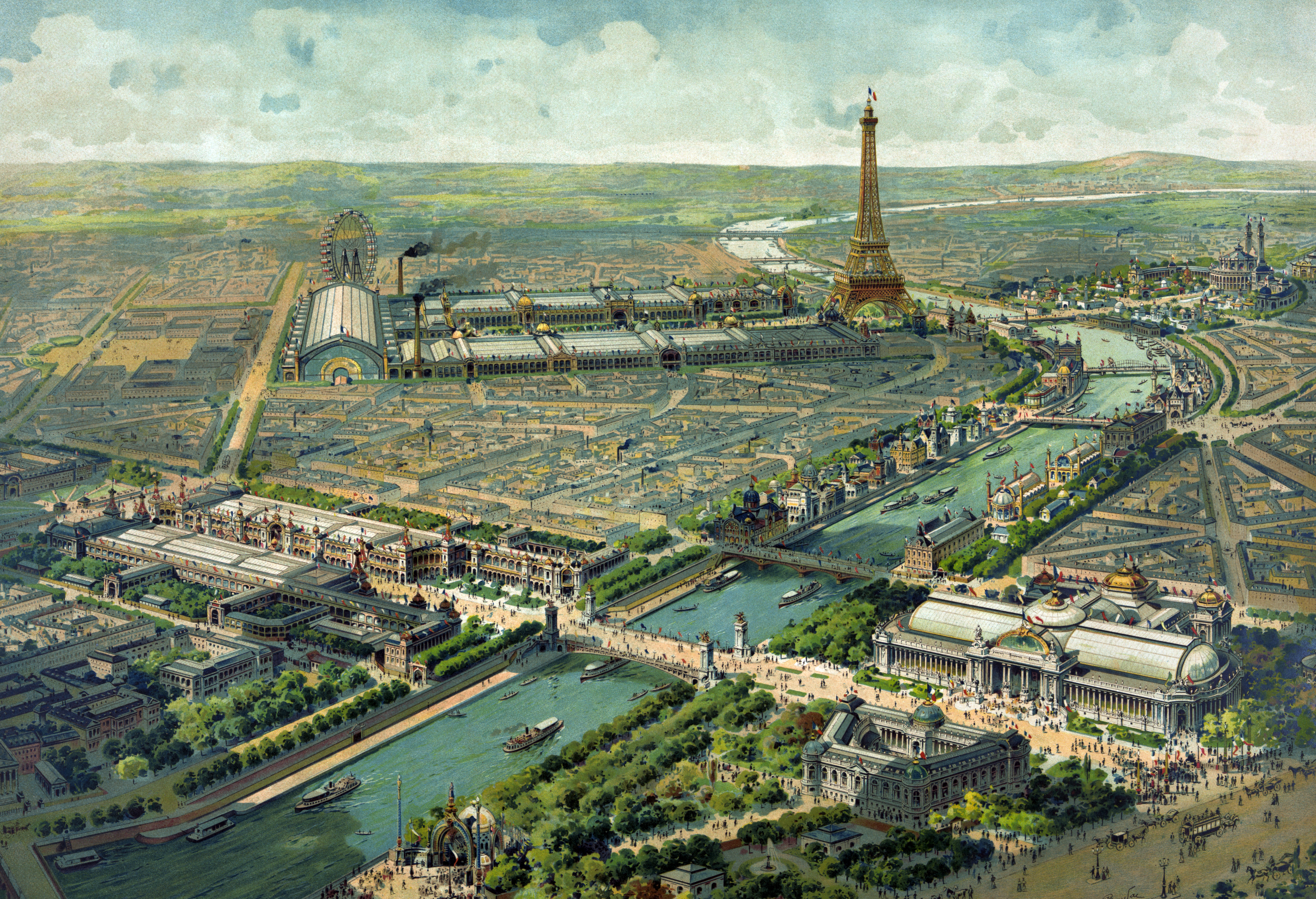
Exposition Universelle view in Paris

- April 14 – The Exposition Universelle, a world's fair, opens in Paris.
- April 22 – Battle of Kousséri: French forces secure their domination of Chad. Warlord Rabih az-Zubayr is defeated and killed.
- April 30 – Casey Jones dies in fatal train accident after his locomotive, No. 382, plows into the caboose and two fully loaded boxcars of corn and hay of locomotive No. 83.

=== May ===
- May – American explorer Robert Peary is the first person to sight Kaffeklubben Island.
- May 1 – Scofield Mine disaster: An explosion of blasting powder in a coal mine in Scofield, Utah, kills 200 people.
- May 14 – The second Olympic Games, Paris 1900, open (as part of the Paris World Exhibition).
- May 17
  - Second Boer War: The British Army relieves the Siege of Mafeking.
  - Boxer Rebellion: Boxers destroy three villages near Peking and kill 60 Chinese Christians.
  - L. Frank Baum's The Wonderful Wizard of Oz is published in Chicago, the first of Baum's Oz books, chronicling the fictional Land of Oz for children.
- May 18 – The United Kingdom proclaims a protectorate over Tonga.
- May 21 – The Chinese province of Manchuria is invaded by the Russian Empire.
- May 24 – Second Boer War: The British annex the Orange Free State, as the Orange River Colony.
- May 28 – Boxer Rebellion: Boxers attack Belgians in the Fengtai railway station.
- May 29 – N'Djamena, the capital city of Chad, is founded as Fort-Lamy by French commander Émile Gentil.
- May 31 – Boxer Rebellion: Peacekeepers from various European countries arrive in China, where they eventually unite with Japanese forces.

=== June ===
- June 5 – Second Boer War: British soldiers take Pretoria.
- June 11 – 1899–1900 peasant unrest in Bulgaria starts to turn passive.
- June 14 – The Reichstag approves the second of the German Naval Laws allowing expansion of the Imperial German Navy.
- June 17 – Boxer Rebellion: Battle of Dagu Forts – Naval forces of the Eight-Nation Alliance capture the Taku Forts, on the Hai River estuary in China.
- June 20 – Boxer Rebellion: Boxers gather about 20,000 people near Peking, and kill hundreds of European citizens, including the German ambassador.
- June 25 – Taoist monk Wang Yuanlu discovers the Dunhuang manuscripts, a cache of ancient texts that are of great historical and religious significance, in the Mogao Caves of Dunhuang, China, where they have been sealed since the early 11th century.
- June 30 – Hoboken Docks fire: A wharf fire at the docks in Hoboken, New Jersey, spreads to German passenger ships Saale, Main and Bremen. The fire engulfs the adjacent piers and nearby ships, killing 326 people.

=== July ===
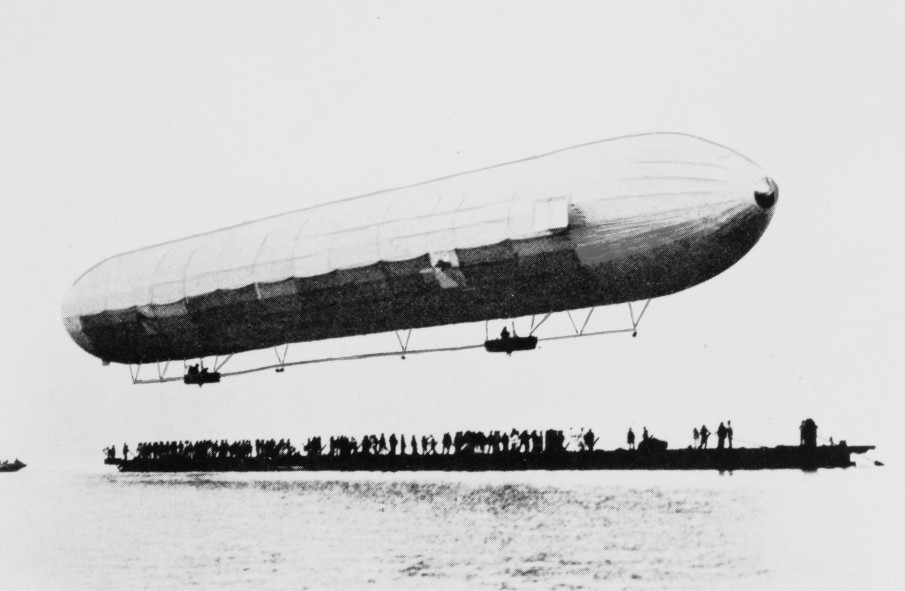
July 2: First successful rigid airship flight by Zeppelin LZ 1

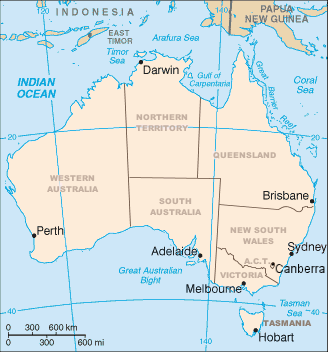
July 9: Federation of Australia enacted.

- July 1 – Archduke Franz Ferdinand of Austria makes a morganatic marriage with Sophie, Duchess of Hohenberg.
- July 2 – The first zeppelin airship flight, by Zeppelin LZ 1, is carried out over Lake Constance, near Friedrichshafen, Germany.
- July 9 – The Federation of Australia is enacted, marking the unification of its colonies into a single country.
- July 12 – The new German cruise liner SS Deutschland breaks the record for the Blue Riband on her maiden transatlantic voyage with an average speed of 22.4 knots (41.5 km/h).
- July 19 – The first line of the Paris Metro opens.
- July 23 – 25 – The First Pan-African Conference is held in London.
- July 29 – King Umberto I of Italy is assassinated by Italian-born anarchist Gaetano Bresci in Monza.

=== August ===
- August 14 – Boxer Rebellion: An international contingent of troops, under British command, invades Peking and frees the European hostages.

=== September ===
- September 8 – The 1900 Galveston hurricane, killing around 8,000 people. It is the deadliest hurricane in U.S. history.
- September 12 – Admiral Fredrik von Otter becomes Prime Minister of Sweden.
- September 13 – Philippine–American War: Battle of Pulang Lupa – Filipino troops under Maximo Abad defeat a detachment of American soldiers.
- September 17 – Philippine–American War: Battle of Mabitac – Filipinos under Juan Cailles defeat the Americans.

=== October ===
- October 9 – The Cook Islands become a territory of the United Kingdom.
- October 19 – Max Planck first states Planck's law of black-body radiation to a meeting of the German Physical Society in Berlin, marking the birth of modern quantum mechanics. He restates it on December 14.
- October 24 – 1900 United Kingdom general election: voting concludes with the Unionists led by the Marquess of Salisbury re-elected.
- October 25 – The United Kingdom annexes the Transvaal.

=== November ===
- November 6 – 1900 United States presidential election: Republican incumbent William McKinley is re-elected by defeating Democratic challenger William Jennings Bryan in a rematch.
- November 7 – 1900 Canadian federal election: Liberal incumbent Sir Wilfrid Laurier is reelected by defeating Conservative leader Sir Charles Tupper again after having done that in the 1896 Canadian federal election.
- November 29 – Herbert Kitchener succeeds Frederick Roberts as commander-in-chief of the British forces in South Africa and implements a scorched earth strategy.

=== December ===
- December 5 – The final Anglo-Ashanti War, "War of the Golden Stool", is declared over. Most of the British troops and Governor James Willcocks depart the city of Kumasi.
- December 14 – History of quantum mechanics: Max Planck presents his groundbreaking paper on quantum theory to the German Physical Society in Berlin.
- December 16 – The German training frigate Gneisenau, with 450 naval cadets on board, sinks in a storm during exercises off of the Spanish coast at Málaga, drowning 136.
- December 17 – The Prix Guzman, first and only prize ever offered for communication with extraterrestrial life, is announced in Paris. A prize of 100,000 francs is provided, except for communication with Mars, which is considered too easy.
- December 19 – Hopetoun Blunder: The first Governor-General of Australia, John Hope, 7th Earl of Hopetoun, appoints Sir William Lyne premier of the new state of New South Wales, but he is unable to persuade other colonial politicians to join his government, and is forced to resign.
- December 23 – Reginald Fessenden makes the first use of amplitude modulation (the basis for AM radio) for wireless transmission of the human voice, from Cobb Island (Maryland).
- December 24 – Boxer Rebellion Demands: The foreign powers present their 12 conditions for reform to the Chinese Imperial government, including the payment of a large indemnity.
- December 28 – The first steel produced by electrometallurgy (from an electric furnace) is delivered.

== Births ==
=== January ===
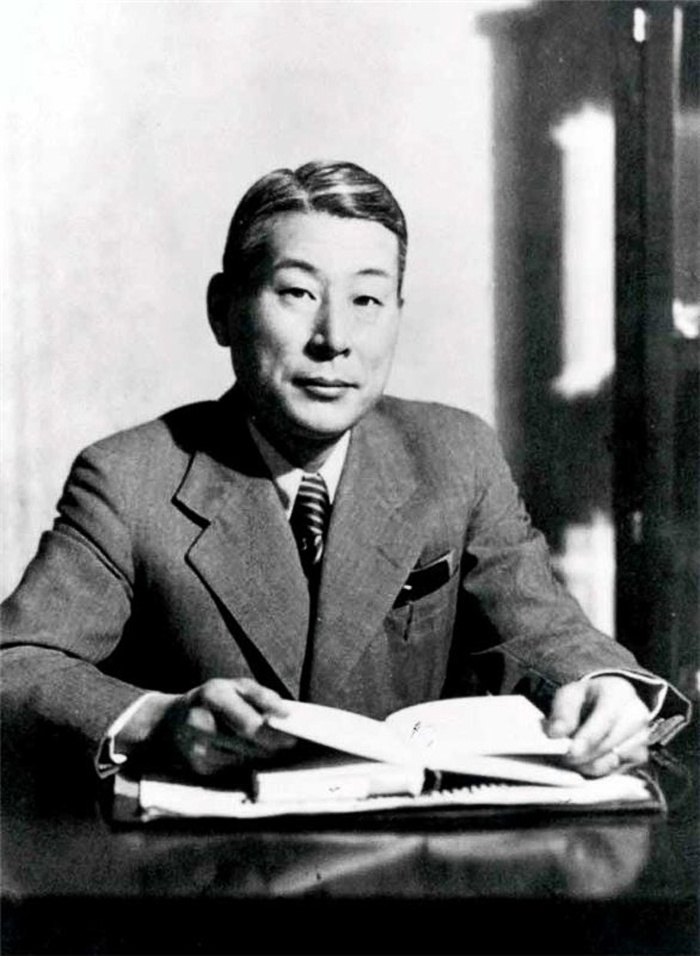
Chiune Sugihara

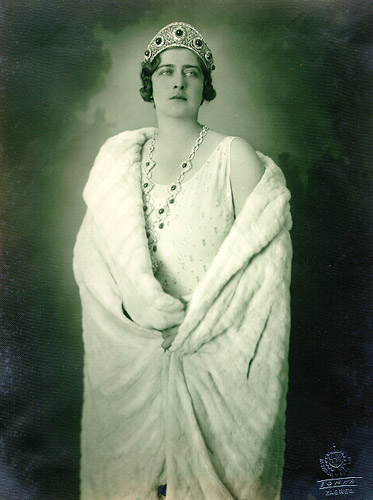
Queen Maria of Yugoslavia

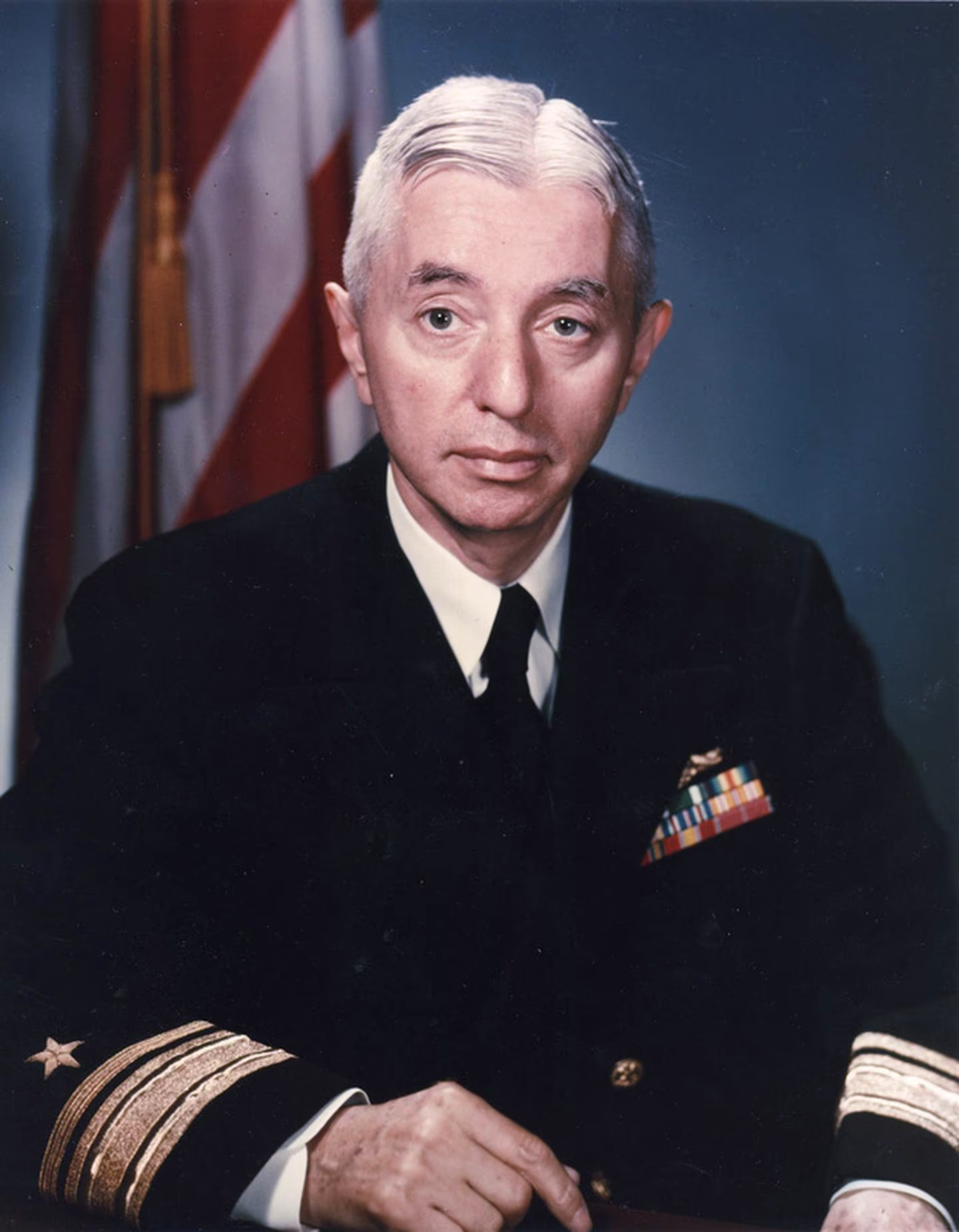
Hyman G. Rickover

- January 1
  - Xavier Cugat, Spanish-born Cuban bandleader (d. 1990)
  - Chiune Sugihara, Japanese diplomat and humanitarian (d. 1986)
- January 2 – William Haines, American actor (d. 1973)
- January 3 – Maurice Jaubert, French composer and soldier (d. 1940)
- January 4 – James Bond, American ornithologist (d. 1989)
- January 5 – Yves Tanguy, French painter (d. 1955)
- January 6 – Maria of Yugoslavia, queen consort (d. 1961)
- January 8
  - Dorothy Adams, American character actress (d. 1988)
  - Solon Earl Low, Canadian social credit politician (d. 1962)
- January 16 – Edith Frank, German-Dutch mother of Anne Frank (d. 1945)
- January 18 – Wan Laiming, Chinese animator (d. 1997)
- January 20 – Colin Clive, British actor (d. 1937)
- January 24 – Theodosius Dobzhansky, Ukrainian geneticist, evolutionary biologist (d. 1975)
- January 26 – Karl Ristenpart, German conductor (d. 1967)
- January 27 – Hyman G. Rickover, American admiral (d. 1986)
- January 30 – Martita Hunt, Argentine-born British actress (d. 1969)
- January 31 – Betty Parsons, American artist, art dealer and collector (d. 1982)

=== February ===
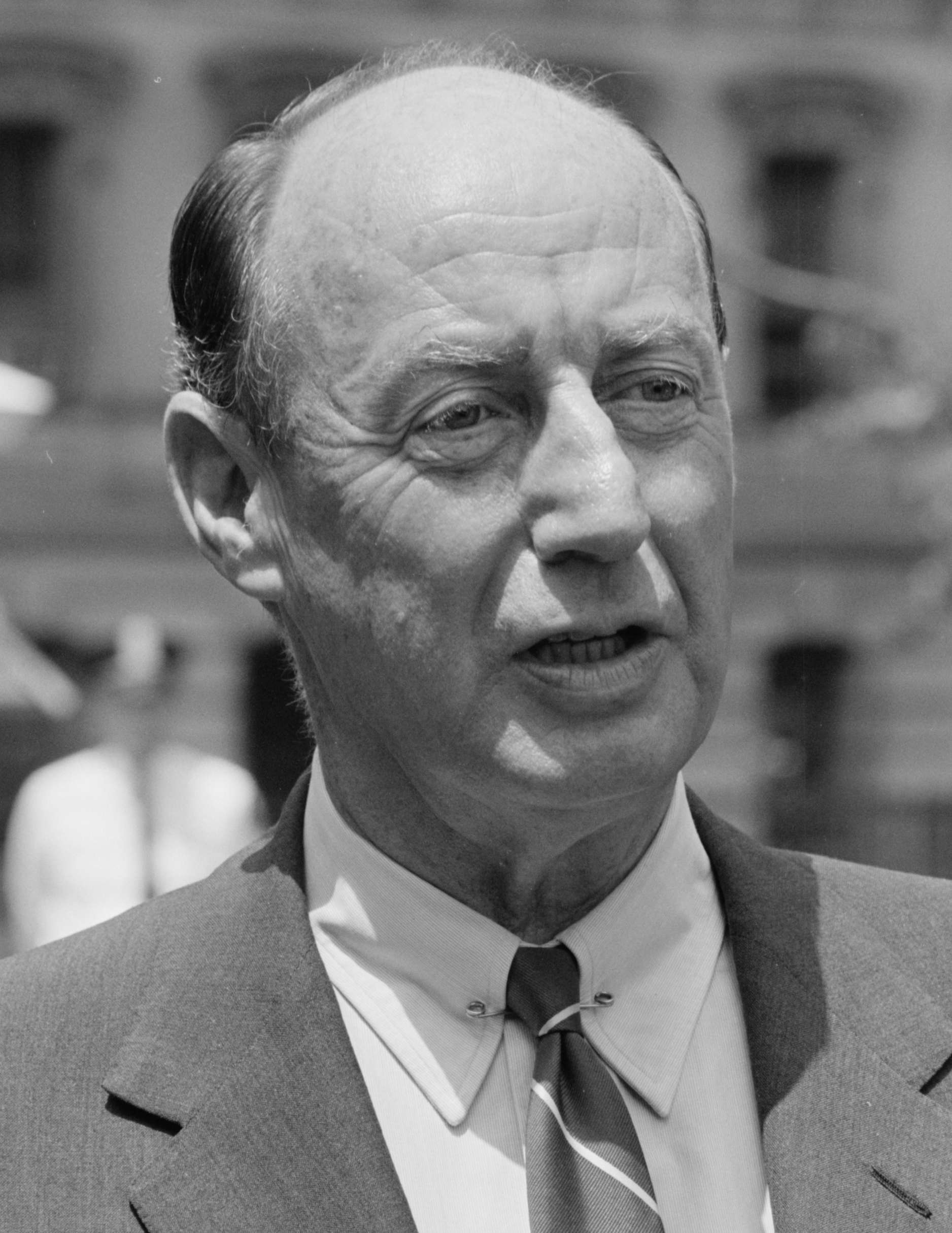
Adlai Stevenson II

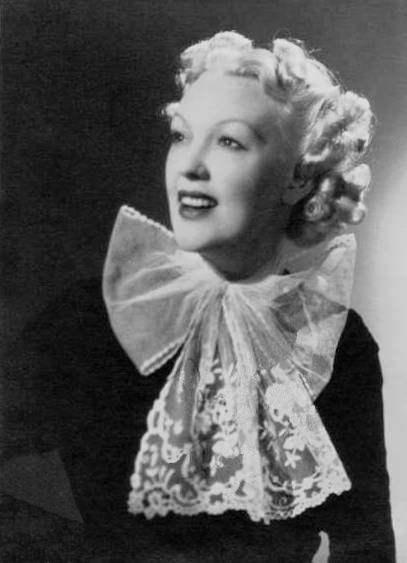
Jeanne Aubert

- February 4 – Jacques Prévert, French lyricist and author (d. 1977)
- February 5 – Adlai Stevenson II, American politician (d. 1965)
- February 9 – Eliseu Maria Coroli, catholic Italo-Brazilian bishop (d. 1982)
- February 11
  - Ellen Broe, Danish nurse, pioneer in nursing education (d. 1994)
  - Hans-Georg Gadamer, German philosopher (d. 2002)
  - Jōsei Toda, Japanese educator and activist (d. 1958)
- February 12
  - Vasily Chuikov, Soviet general, Marshal of the Soviet Union during WWII (d. 1982)
  - Roger J. Traynor, American judge (d. 1983)
- February 21 – Jeanne Aubert, French singer and actress (d. 1988)
- February 22 – Luis Buñuel, Spanish film director (d. 1983)
- February 24 – Irmgard Bartenieff, German-American dancer, physical therapist and pioneer of dance therapy (d. 1981)
- February 26 – Halina Konopacka, Polish discus thrower, Olympic champion (1928) (d. 1989)
- February 27 – Juan Pablo Barrero, Spanish footballer and lawyer (d. 1966)

=== March ===
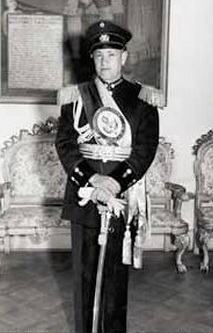
Gustavo Rojas Pinilla

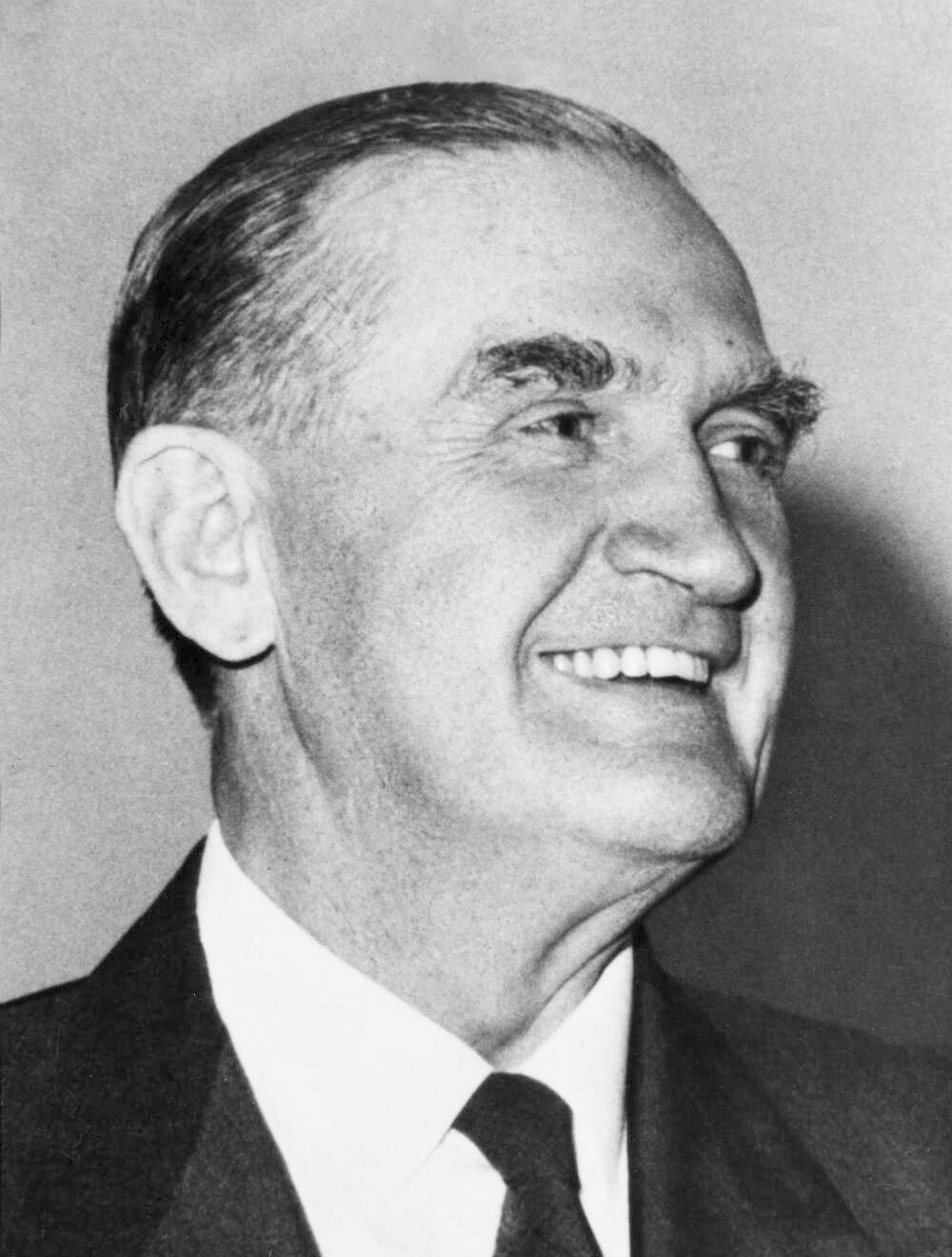
Sir John McEwen

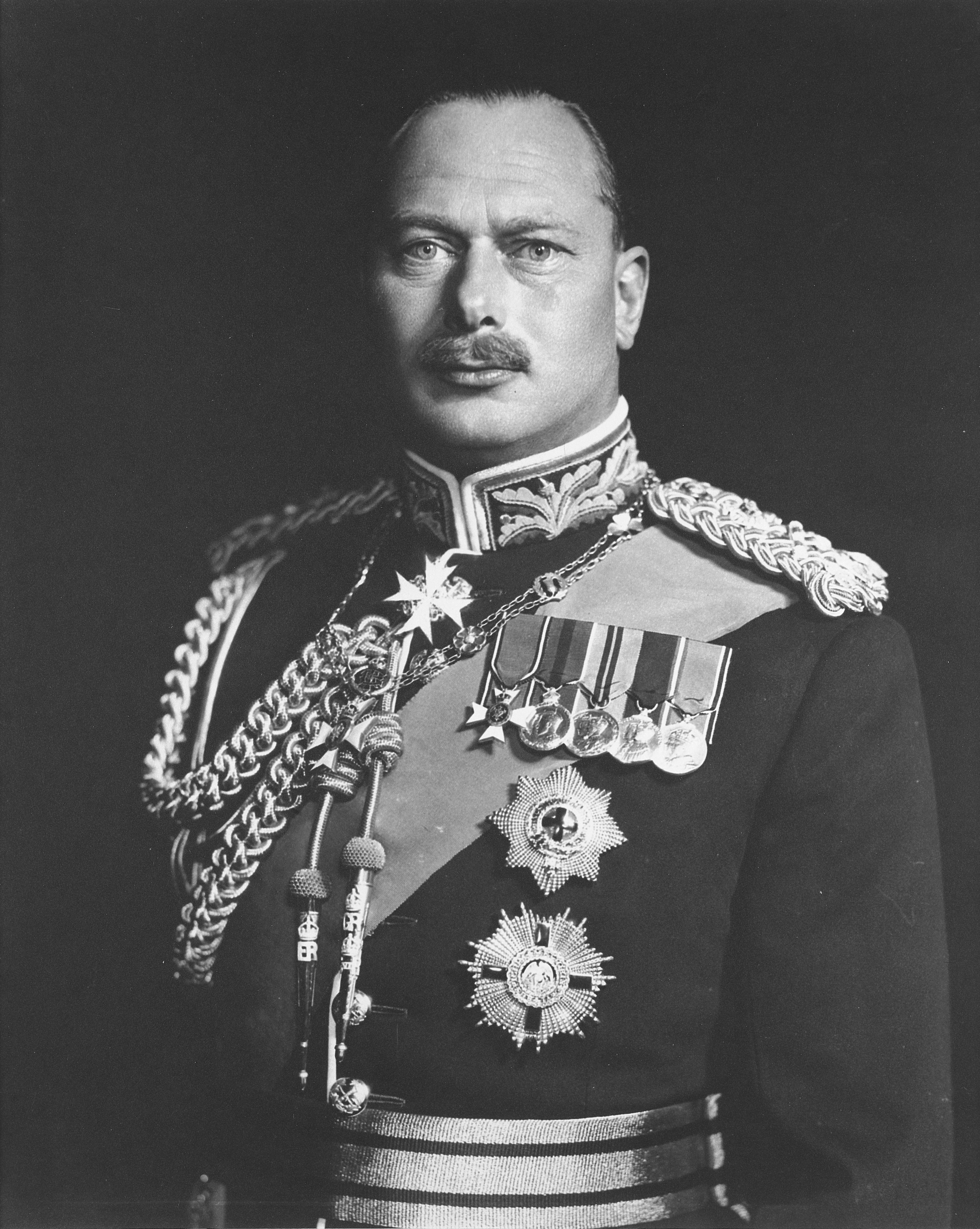
Prince Henry, Duke of Gloucester

- March 3
  - Maghfoor Ahmad Ajazi, Indian independence activist (d. 1966)
  - Edna Best, British actress (d. 1974)
- March 4 – Herbert Biberman, American screenwriter, film director (d. 1971)
- March 7
  - Fritz London, German physicist (d. 1954)
  - Carel Willink, Dutch painter (d. 1983)
- March 8 – Howard H. Aiken, American computing pioneer (d. 1973)
- March 12 – Gustavo Rojas Pinilla, 19th President of Colombia (d. 1975)
- March 13
  - Sālote Tupou III, queen regnant of Tonga, (d. 1965)
  - Giorgos Seferis, Greek poet, recipient of the Nobel Prize in Literature (d. 1971)
- March 17 – Alfred Newman, American film composer (d. 1970)
- March 19 – Frédéric Joliot-Curie, French physicist, recipient of the Nobel Prize in Chemistry (d. 1958)
- March 23 – Erich Fromm, German-born psychologist and philosopher (d. 1980)
- March 29
  - Sir John McEwen, 18th Prime Minister of Australia (d. 1980)
  - Oscar Elton Sette, American fisheries scientist (d. 1972)
- March 31 – Prince Henry, Duke of Gloucester, British royal family member (d. 1974)

=== April ===
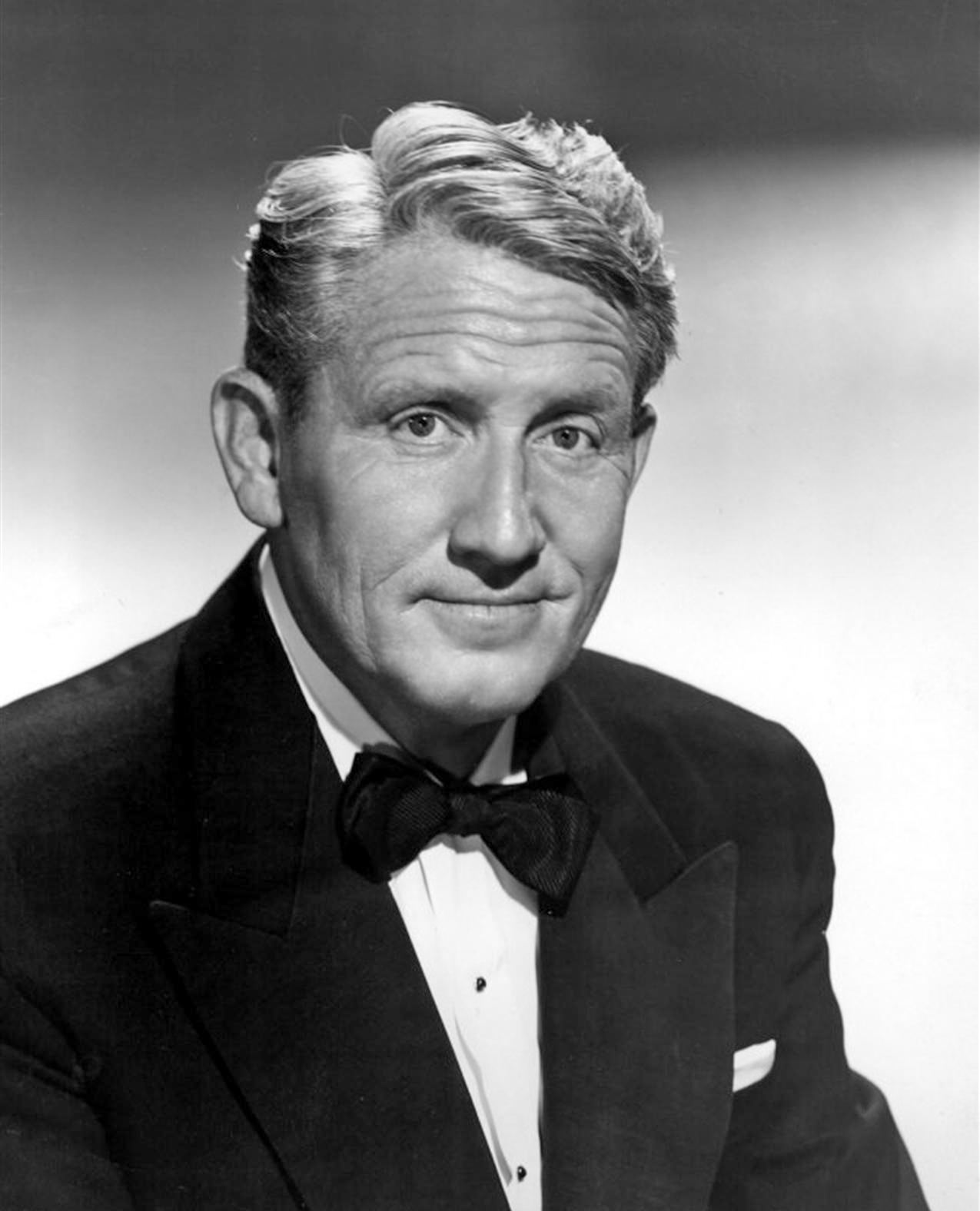
Spencer Tracy

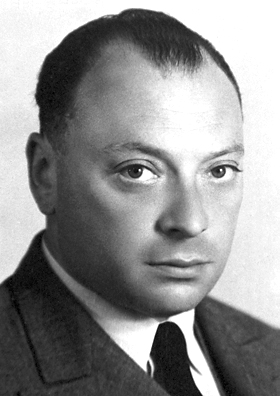
Wolfgang Pauli

- April 1 – Stefanie Clausen, Danish Olympic diver (d. 1981)
- April 2 - Heinrich Besseler, German musicologist (d. 1969)
- April 3 – Camille Chamoun, 7th president of Lebanon (d. 1987)
- April 5 – Spencer Tracy, American actor (d. 1967)
- April 8 – Marie Byles, Australian solicitor (d. 1979)
- April 11 – Sándor Márai, Hungarian writer and journalist (d. 1989)
- April 16 – Polly Adler, Russian-born American author, madam (d. 1962)
- April 18 – Bertha Isaacs, Bahamian teacher, tennis player, politician and women's rights activist (d. 1997)
- April 21 – Hans Fritzsche, German Nazi official (d. 1953)
- April 24 – Elizabeth Goudge, English novelist (d. 1984)
- April 25 – Wolfgang Pauli, Austrian-born American physicist, Nobel Prize laureate (d. 1958)
- April 26 – Charles Richter, American seismologist and physicist (d. 1985)
- April 28 – Maurice Thorez, French Communist leader (d. 1964)
- April 30 – David Manners, Canadian-American actor (d. 1998)

=== May ===
- May 1 – Ignazio Silone, Italian author (d. 1978)
- May 2 – A. W. Lawrence, British archaeologist (d. 1991)
- May 6 – Zheng Ji, Chinese nutritionist, biochemist (d. 2010)
- May 10
  - Beryl May Dent, English mathematical physicist (d. 1977)
  - Cecilia Payne-Gaposchkin, British-American astronomer, astrophysicist (d. 1979)
- May 11 – Thomas H. Robbins Jr., American admiral (d. 1972)
- May 13 – Karl Wolff, German SS functionary and war criminal (d. 1984)
- May 14 – Cai Chang, Chinese politician, women's rights activist (d. 1990)
- May 15 – Ida Rhodes, American mathematician, pioneer in computer programming (d. 1986)
- May 23 – Hans Frank, German Nazi official (executed 1946)
- May 28 – Tommy Ladnier, American jazz trumpeter (d. 1939)
- May 29 – David Maxwell Fyfe, 1st Earl of Kilmuir, British politician, lawyer and judge (d. 1967)
- May 31 – Lucile Godbold, American Olympic athlete (d. 1981)

=== June ===
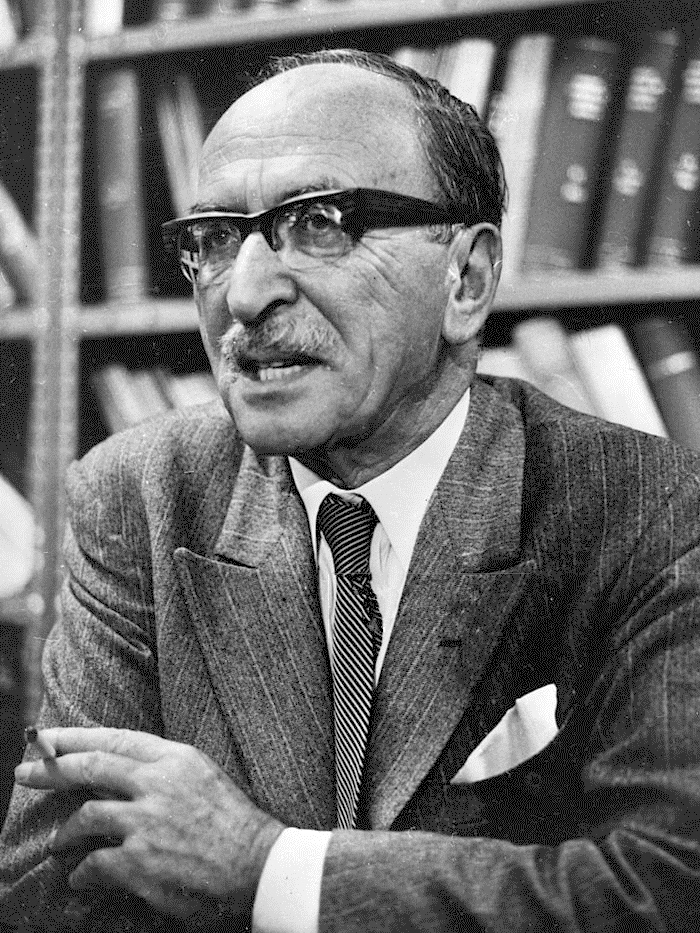
Dennis Gabor

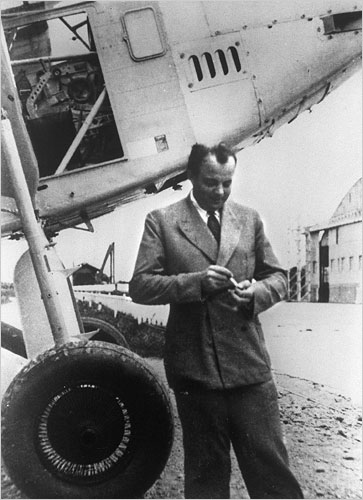
Antoine de Saint-Exupéry

- June 5 – Dennis Gabor, Hungarian-born British physicist, Nobel Prize laureate (d. 1979)
- June 7 – Frederick Terman, American electrical engineer, professor (d. 1982)
- June 11 – Leopoldo Marechal, Argentine writer (d. 1970)
- June 17
  - Martin Bormann, German Nazi official (d. 1945)
  - Evelyn Irons, Scottish journalist, war correspondent (d. 2000)
- June 21 – Choi Yong-kun, North Korean general, defense minister (d. 1976)
- June 24 – Raphael Lemkin, Polish international lawyer (d. 1959)
- June 25
  - Georgia Hale, American silent film actress (d. 1985)
  - Louis Mountbatten, 1st Earl Mountbatten of Burma, English naval officer and last Viceroy of India (assassinated) (d. 1979)
- June 29 – Antoine de Saint-Exupéry, French aviator and writer (d. 1944)

=== July ===
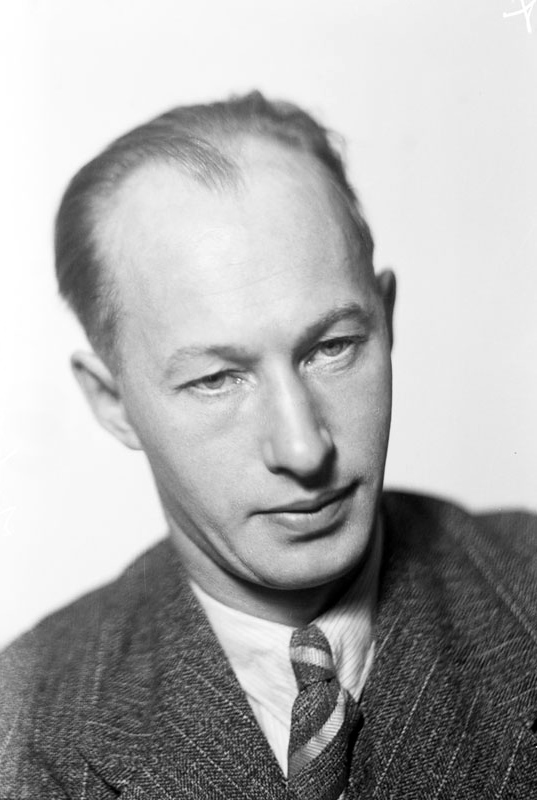
Eyvind Johnson

- July 3 – Alessandro Blasetti, Italian film director and screenwriter (d. 1987)
- July 4
  - Robert Desnos, French poet (d. 1945)
  - Nellie Mae Rowe, African-American folk artist (d. 1982)
- July 5 – Bernardus Johannes Alfrink, Dutch cardinal, Archbishop of Utrecht (d. 1987)
- July 6 – Frederica Sagor Maas, American playwright, essayist and author (d. 2012)
- July 7 – Earle E. Partridge, American general (d. 1990)
- July 10 – Evelyn Laye, English actress (d. 1996)
- July 13 – George Lewis, American jazz clarinetist (d. 1968)
- July 23 – John Babcock, last surviving Canadian World War I veteran (d. 2010)
- July 28 – Lady Dorothy Macmillan, spouse of the Prime Minister of the United Kingdom (d. 1966)
- July 29
  - Eyvind Johnson, Swedish novelist, Nobel Prize laureate (d. 1976)
  - Teresa Noce, Italian labor leader, activist and journalist (d. 1980)

=== August ===
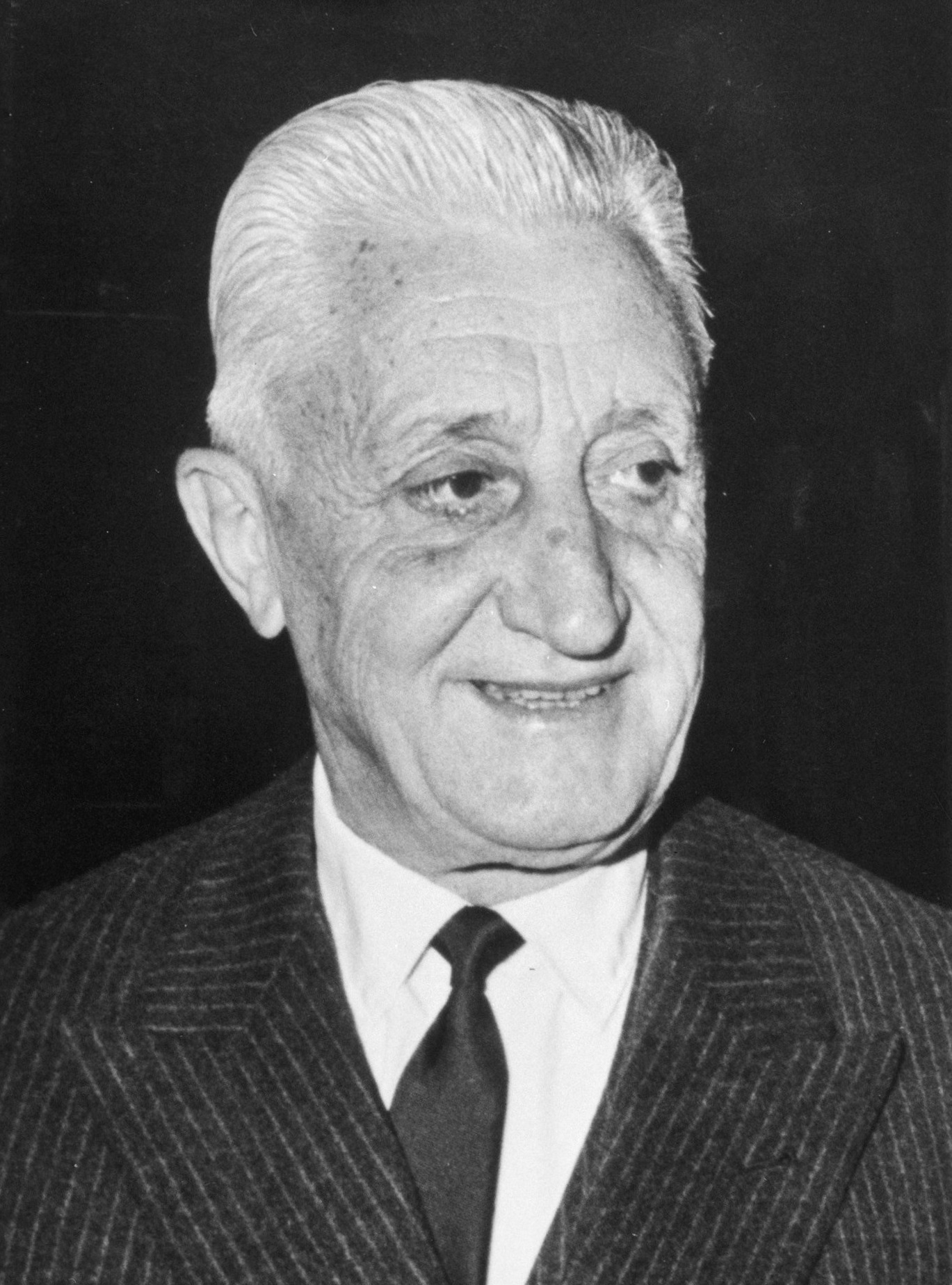
Arturo Umberto Illia

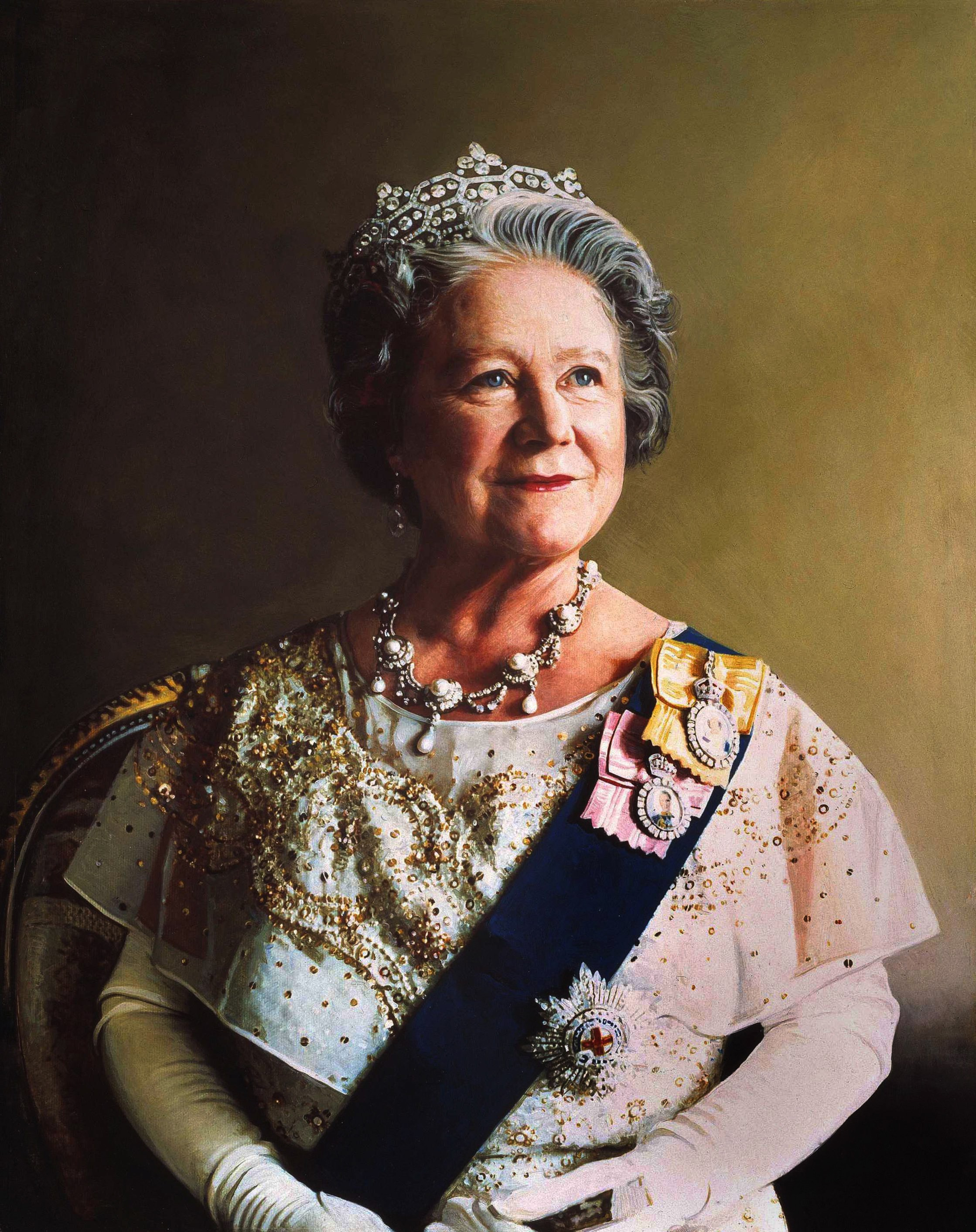
Queen Elizabeth The Queen Mother

- August 3 – Ernie Pyle, American journalist (d. 1945)
- August 4
  - Arturo Umberto Illia, 34th President of Argentina (d. 1983)
  - Queen Elizabeth The Queen Mother, British queen consort of George VI (d. 2002)
- August 6 – Cecil Howard Green, British-born geophysicist, businessman (d. 2003)
- August 9 – Charles Farrell, American actor (d. 1990)
- August 10 – Arthur Porritt, Baron Porritt, New Zealand politician, athlete (d. 1994)
- August 11 – Alexander Mosolov, Russian composer (d. 1973)
- August 15 – Estelle Brody, American silent film actress (d. 1995)
- August 17 – Vivienne de Watteville, British travel writer and adventurer (d. 1957)
- August 18
  - Glenn Albert Black, American archaeologist (d. 1964)
  - Ruth Norman, American religious leader (d. 1993)
- August 19
  - Colleen Moore, American actress (d. 1988)
  - Gilbert Ryle, British philosopher (d. 1976)
  - Dorothy Burr Thompson, American archaeologist, art historian (d. 2001)
- August 23 – Ernst Krenek, Austrian-American composer (d. 1991)
- August 25 – Sir Hans Krebs, German-born British biochemist, recipient of the Nobel Prize in Physiology or Medicine (d. 1981)

=== September ===
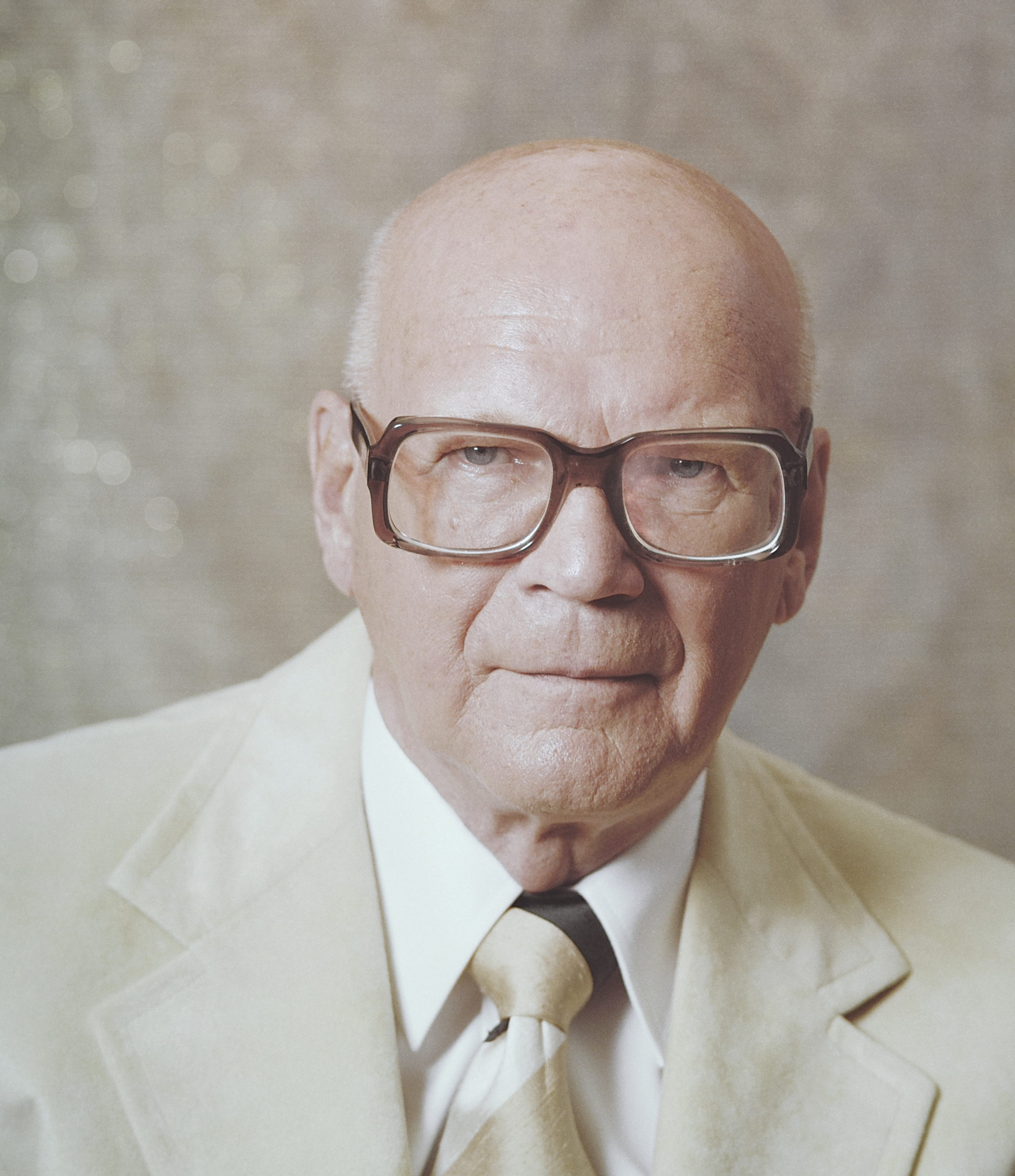
Urho Kekkonen

- September 3 – Urho Kekkonen, 8th President of Finland (d. 1986)
- September 6 – W. A. C. Bennett, Canadian politician (d. 1979)
- September 8 – Tilly Devine, English-born Australian organised crime boss (d. 1970)
- September 17 – J. Willard Marriott, American entrepreneur, founder of Marriott International (d. 1985)
- September 18 – Seewoosagur Ramgoolam, 1st prime minister of Mauritius (d. 1985)
- September 20 – Uuno Klami, Finnish composer (d. 1961)
- September 22 – Paul Hugh Emmett, American chemical engineer (d. 1985)
- September 26 – Suzanne Belperron, French jewellery designer (d. 1983)
- September 29 – Miguel Alemán Valdés, 46th President of Mexico, 1946–1952 (d. 1983)

=== October ===
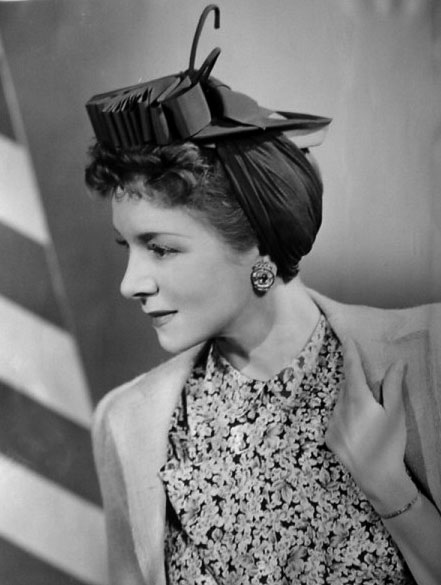
Helen Hayes

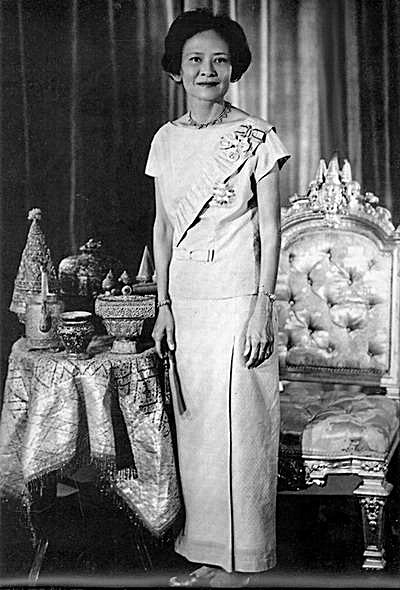
Srinagarindra

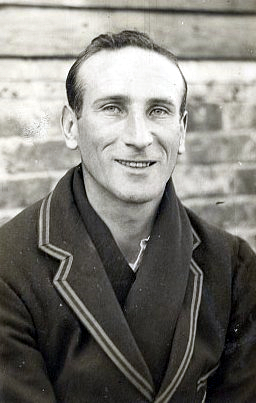
Douglas Jardine

- October 5 – Bing Xin, Chinese author, poet, known for her contributions to children's literature (d. 1999)
- October 7 – Heinrich Himmler, German Nazi official, SS head (d. 1945)
- October 10 – Helen Hayes, American actress (d. 1993)
- October 16 – Edward Ardizzone, English painter, printmaker and author (d. 1979)
- October 17 – Jean Arthur, American actress (d. 1991)
- October 18 – Sarah Bavly, Dutch-Israeli nutritionist, author and educator (d. 1993)
- October 19 – Bill Ponsford, Australian cricketer (d. 1991)
- October 20 – Ismail al-Azhari, 2nd Prime Minister of Sudan, 3rd President of Sudan (d. 1969)
- October 21 – Srinagarindra, Princess Mother of Thailand (d. 1995)
- October 23 – Douglas Jardine, English cricketer (d. 1958)
- October 26
  - Ibrahim Abboud, 4th prime minister, 1st president of Sudan (d. 1983)
  - Karin Boye, Swedish poet and novelist (d. 1941)
- October 28 – Wajid Ali Khan Burki, Pakistani ophthalmologist and army officer.
- October 30 – Ragnar Granit, Finnish-born Swedish physiologist, recipient of the Nobel Prize in Physiology or Medicine.

=== November ===
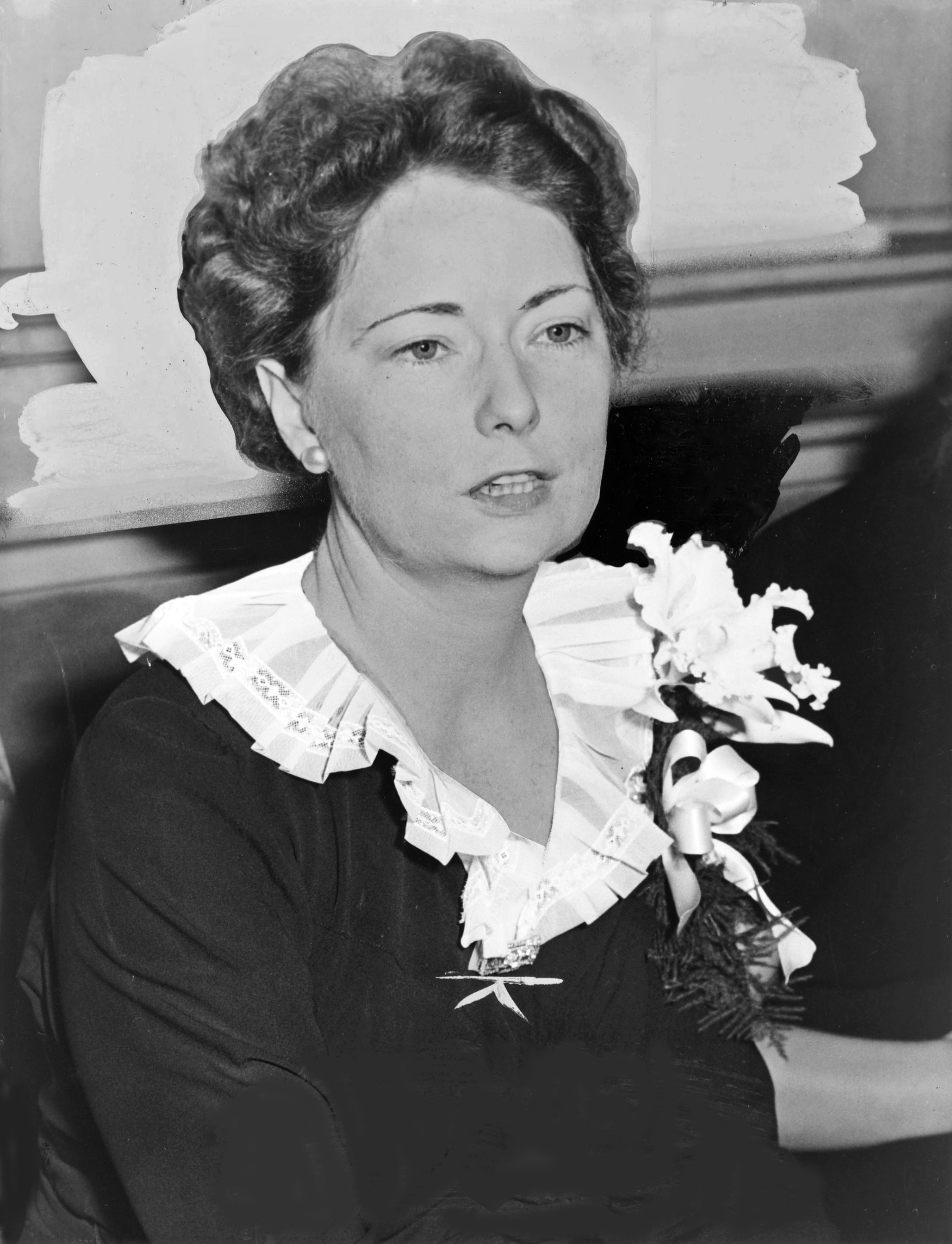
Margaret Mitchell

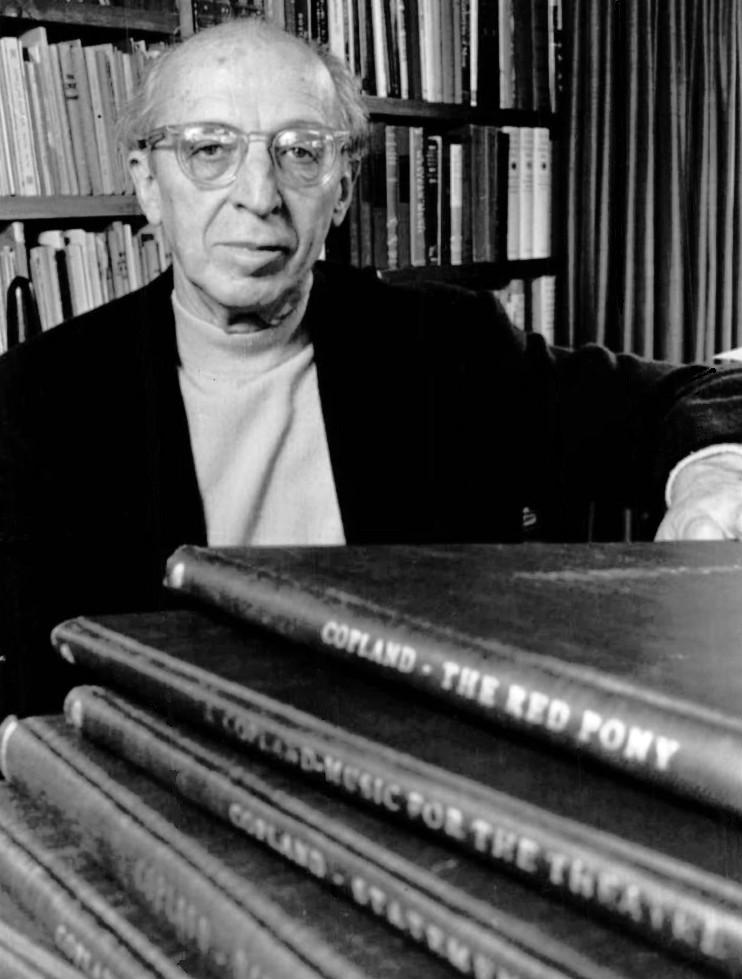
Aaron Copland

- November 4 – Lucrețiu Pătrășcanu, Romanian communist activist, sociologist (d. 1954)
- November 5
  - Martin Dies Jr., American politician (d. 1972)
  - Natalie Schafer, American actress (d. 1991)
- November 8 – Margaret Mitchell, American novelist (Gone With The Wind) (d. 1949)
- November 13 – David Marshall Williams, American inventor (d. 1975)
- November 14 – Aaron Copland, American composer (d. 1990)
- November 16
  - Eliška Junková, Czech automobile racer (d. 1994)
  - Nikolai Pogodin, Soviet playwright (d. 1962)
- November 19 – Anna Seghers, German writer (d. 1983)
- November 25 – Rudolf Höss, German Nazi official (d. 1947)
- November 29
  - Mildred Gillars, American broadcaster (Axis Sally), employed by Nazi Germany to disseminate propaganda during WWII (d. 1988)
  - Håkan Malmrot, Swedish swimmer (d. 1987)
- November 30 – Luigi Stipa, Italian engineer and aircraft designer (d. 1992)

=== December ===
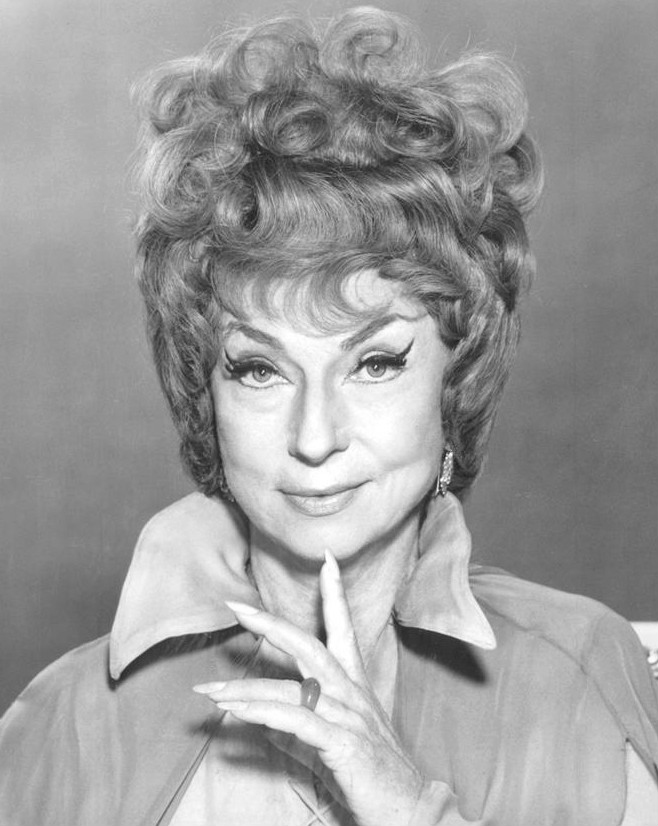
Agnes Moorehead

- December 3 – Richard Kuhn, Austrian chemist, Nobel Prize laureate (d. 1967)
- December 6 – Agnes Moorehead, American actress (Bewitched) (d. 1974)
- December 7 – Kateryna Bilokur, Ukrainian folk artist (d. 1961)
- December 16 – Rudolf Diels, German Nazi civil servant, Gestapo chief (d. 1957)
- December 17
  - Mary Cartwright, British mathematician (d. 1998)
  - Katina Paxinou, Greek actress (d. 1973)
- December 19 – Margaret Brundage, American illustrator (Weird Tales) (d. 1976)
- December 22 – Alan Bush, British composer, pianist and conductor (d. 1995)
- December 23 – José de León Toral, Mexican assassin of president Álvaro Obregón (d. 1929)
- December 24
  - Joey Smallwood, first Premier of Newfoundland and Labrador (d. 1991)
  - Hussein Al Oweini, 18th prime minister of Lebanon (d. 1971)
- December 25 – Antoni Zygmund, Polish mathematician (d. 1992)

=== Date unknown ===
- Rubén Jaramillo, Mexican peasant leader (d. 1962)
- Yung Fung-shee, Hong Kong philanthropist (d. 1972)

== Deaths ==
=== January–March ===
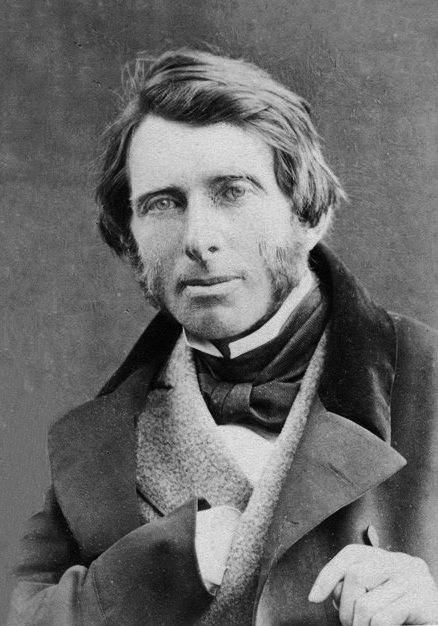
John Ruskin

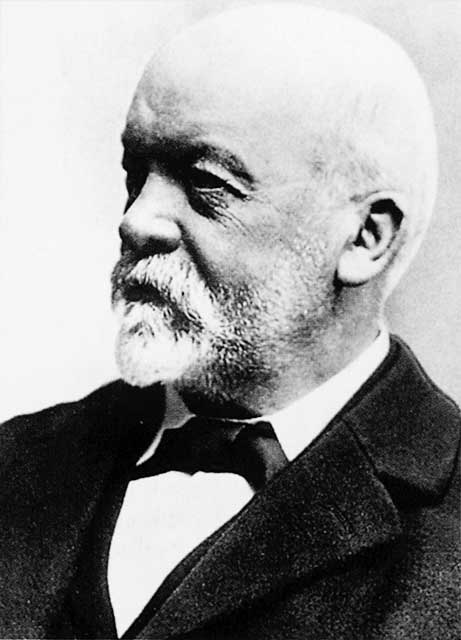
Gottlieb Daimler

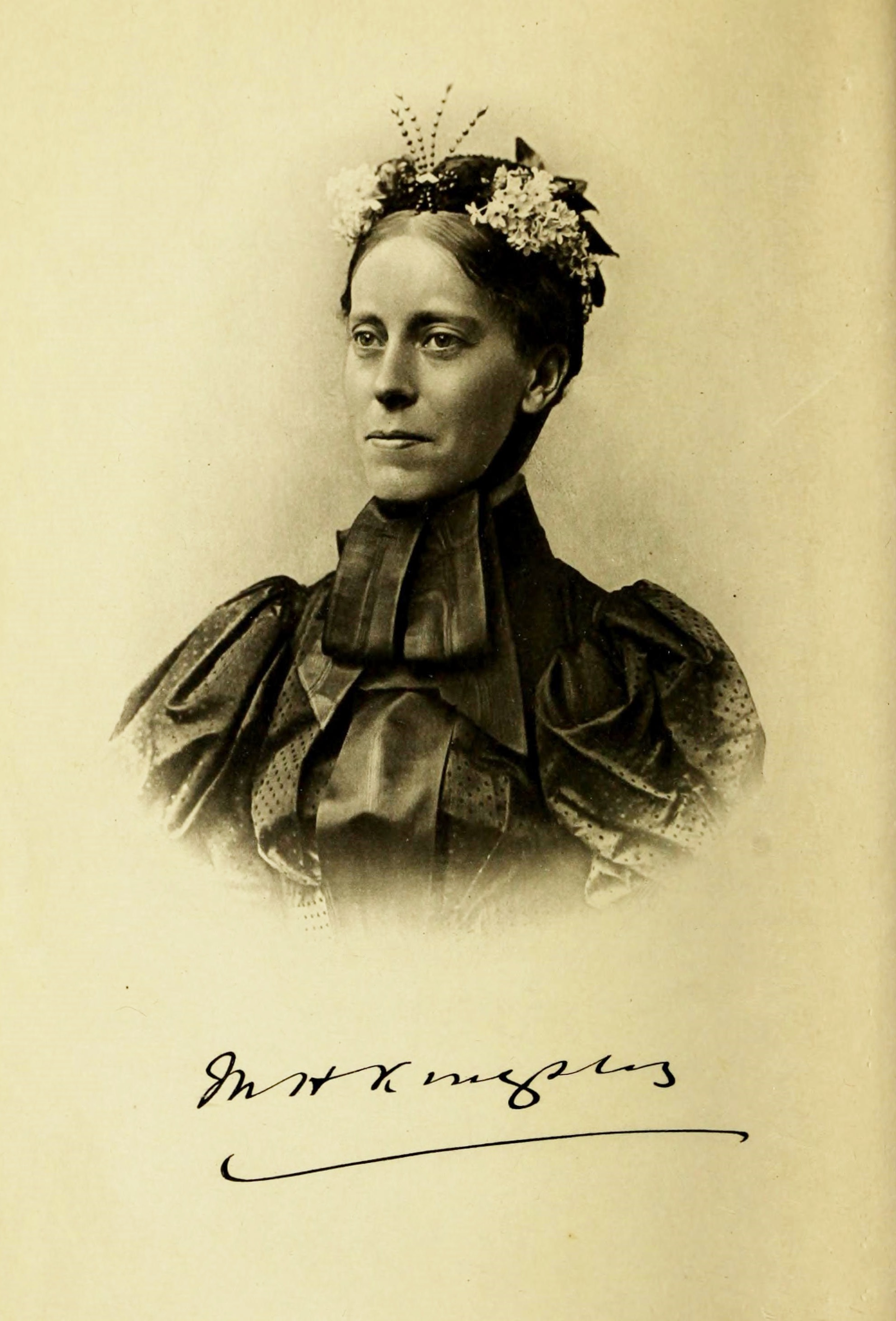
Mary Kingsley

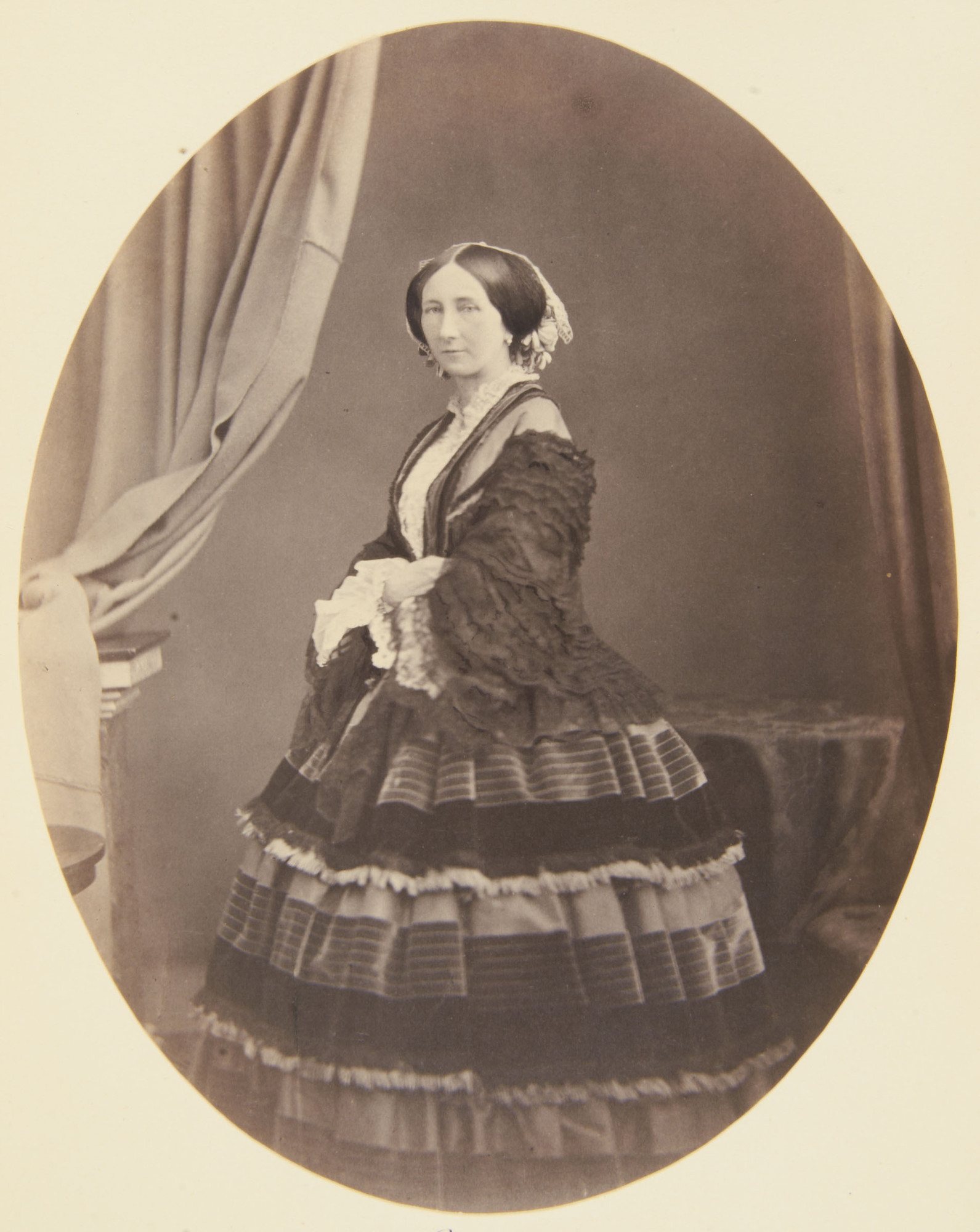
Princess Josephine of Baden

- January 5 – William A. Hammond, American military physician, neurologist, and 11th Surgeon General of the United States Army (1862–1864) (b. 1828)
- January 11 – James Martineau, English religious philosopher (b. 1805)
- January 16 – S. M. I. Henry, American evangelist (b. 1839)
- January 20 – John Ruskin, English writer, artist, and social critic (b. 1819)
- February 18 – Clinton L. Merriam, American politician (b. 1824)
- February 23 – William Butterfield, British architect (b. 1814)
- March 6
  - Carl Bechstein, German piano maker (b. 1826)
  - Gottlieb Daimler, German inventor, automotive pioneer (b. 1834)
- March 7 – Rachel Lloyd, American chemist (b. 1839)
- March 10 – Johan Peter Emilius Hartmann, Danish composer (b. 1805)
- March 18 – Hjalmar Kiærskou, Danish botanist (b. 1835)
- March 28 – Piet Joubert, Boer politician, military commander (b. 1834)
- March 29 – Cyrus K. Holliday, cofounder of Topeka, Kansas, 1st president of the Atchison, Topeka and Santa Fe Railway (b. 1826)

=== April–June ===
- April 2 – Gustaf Åkerhielm, 6th prime minister of Sweden (b. 1833)
- April 5
  - Joseph Bertrand, French mathematician (b. 1822)
  - Maria Louise Eve, American author (b. 1848)
  - Osman Nuri Pasha, Ottoman military leader (b. 1832)
- April 7 – Frederic Edwin Church, American landscape painter (b. 1826)
- April 12 – James Richard Cocke, American physician, homeopath, and pioneer hypnotherapist (b. 1863)
- April 17 – George Curry, Wild West robber (Wild Bunch) (shot) (b. 1871)
- April 19 – James Dawson, Australian activist (b. 1806)
- April 21 – Vikramatji Khimojiraj, Indian ruler (b. 1819)
- April 22 – Amédée-François Lamy, French soldier (b. 1858) (killed in battle)
- April 24 – George Campbell, 8th Duke of Argyll, British politician (b. 1823)
- April 30 – Casey Jones, American railway engineer (b. 1864)
- May 1 – Mihály Munkácsy, Hungarian painter (b. 1844)
- May 2 – Seweryn Morawski, Roman Catholic prelate (b. 1819)
- May 9 – Carit Etlar (Carl Brosbøll), Danish author (b. 1816)
- May 18 – Félix Ravaisson-Mollien, French philosopher (b. 1813)
- May 28 – Sir George Grove, English music writer (b. 1820)
- June 2 – Samori Ture, West African empire-builder (b. 1830)
- June 3 – Mary Kingsley, English explorer, writer (b. 1862)
- June 5 – Stephen Crane, American author (b. 1871)
- June 11 – Belle Boyd, American Confederate spy, actress (b. 1843)
- June 19 – Princess Josephine of Baden (b. 1813)

=== July–September ===
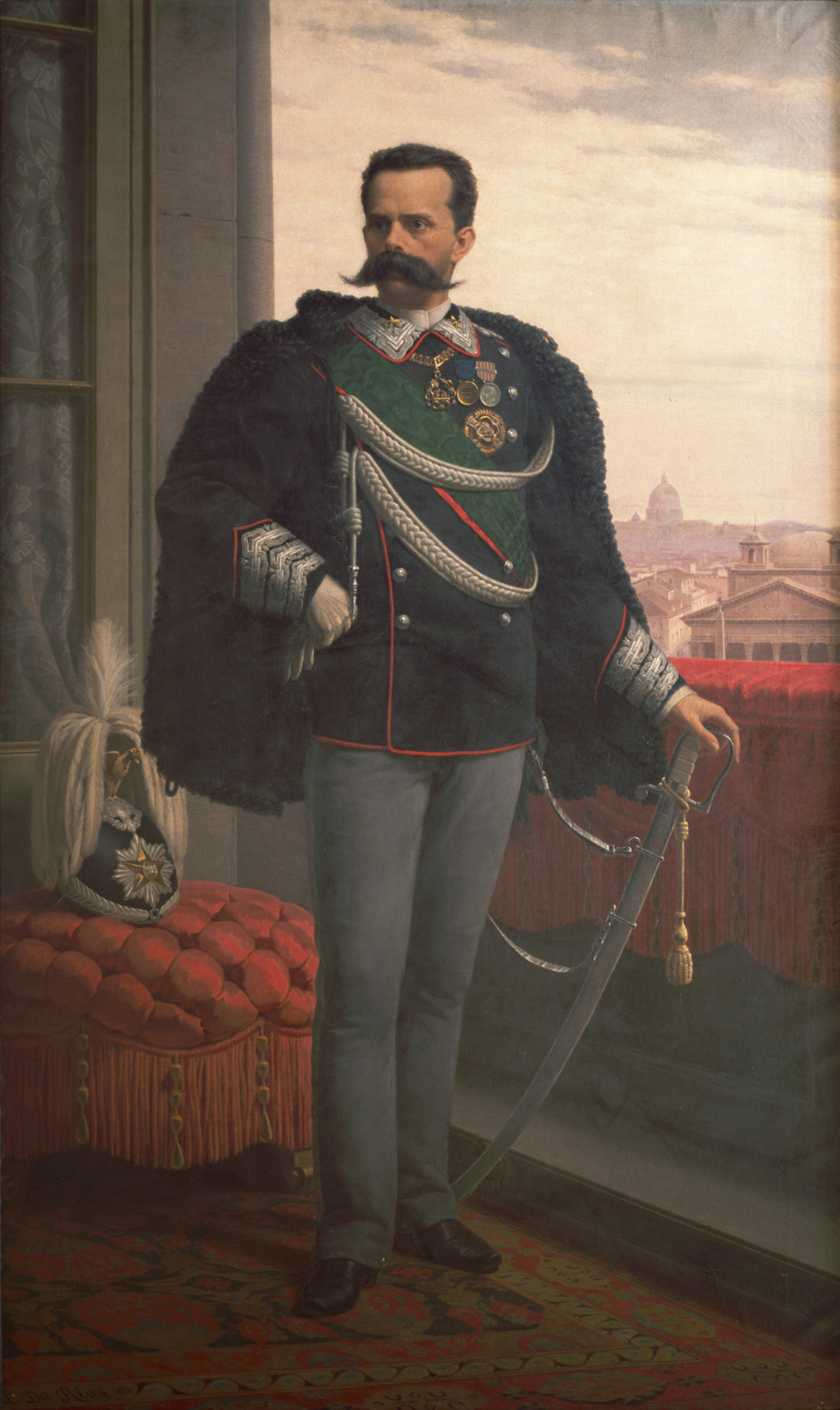
King Umberto I

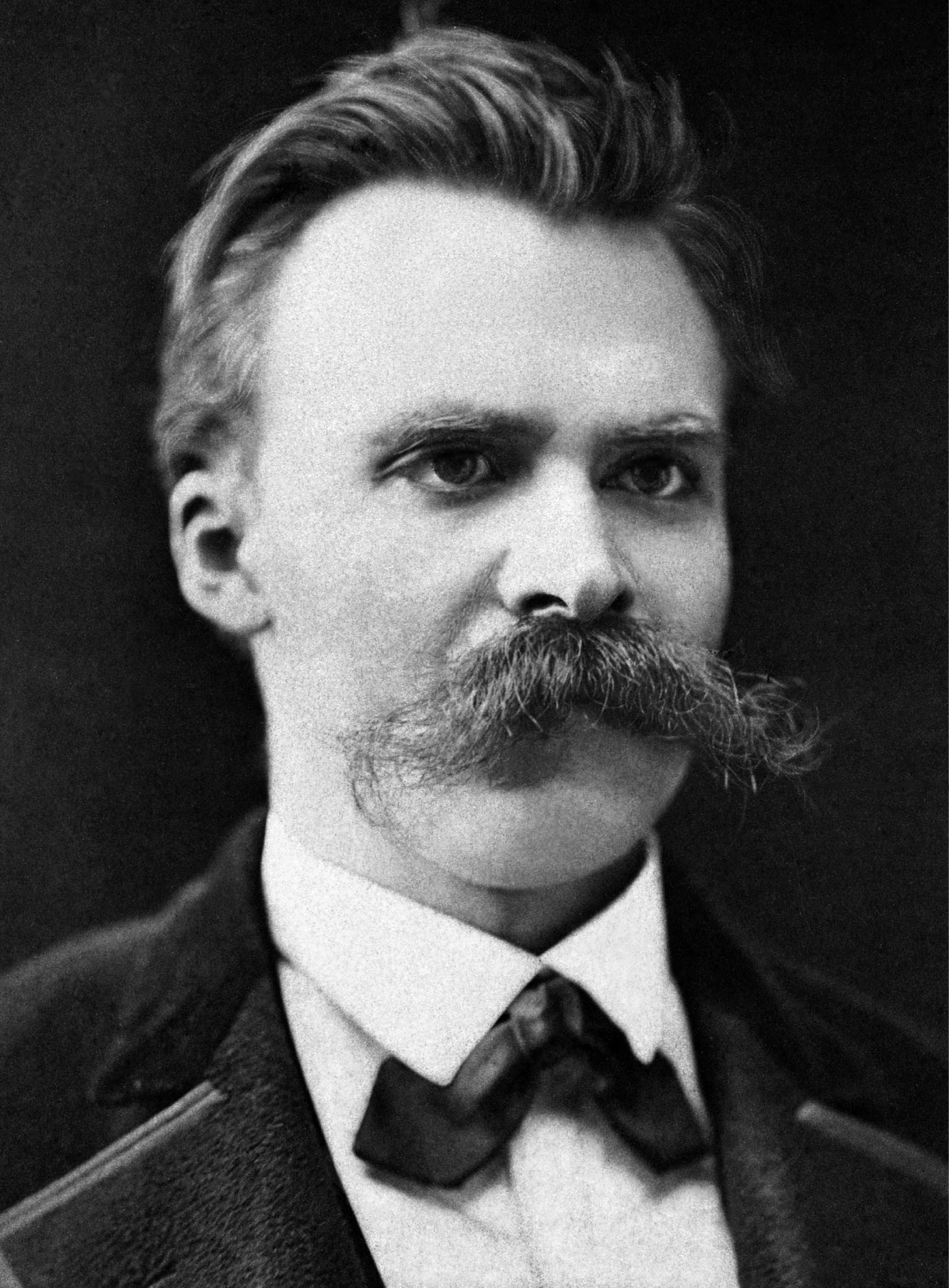
Friedrich Nietzsche

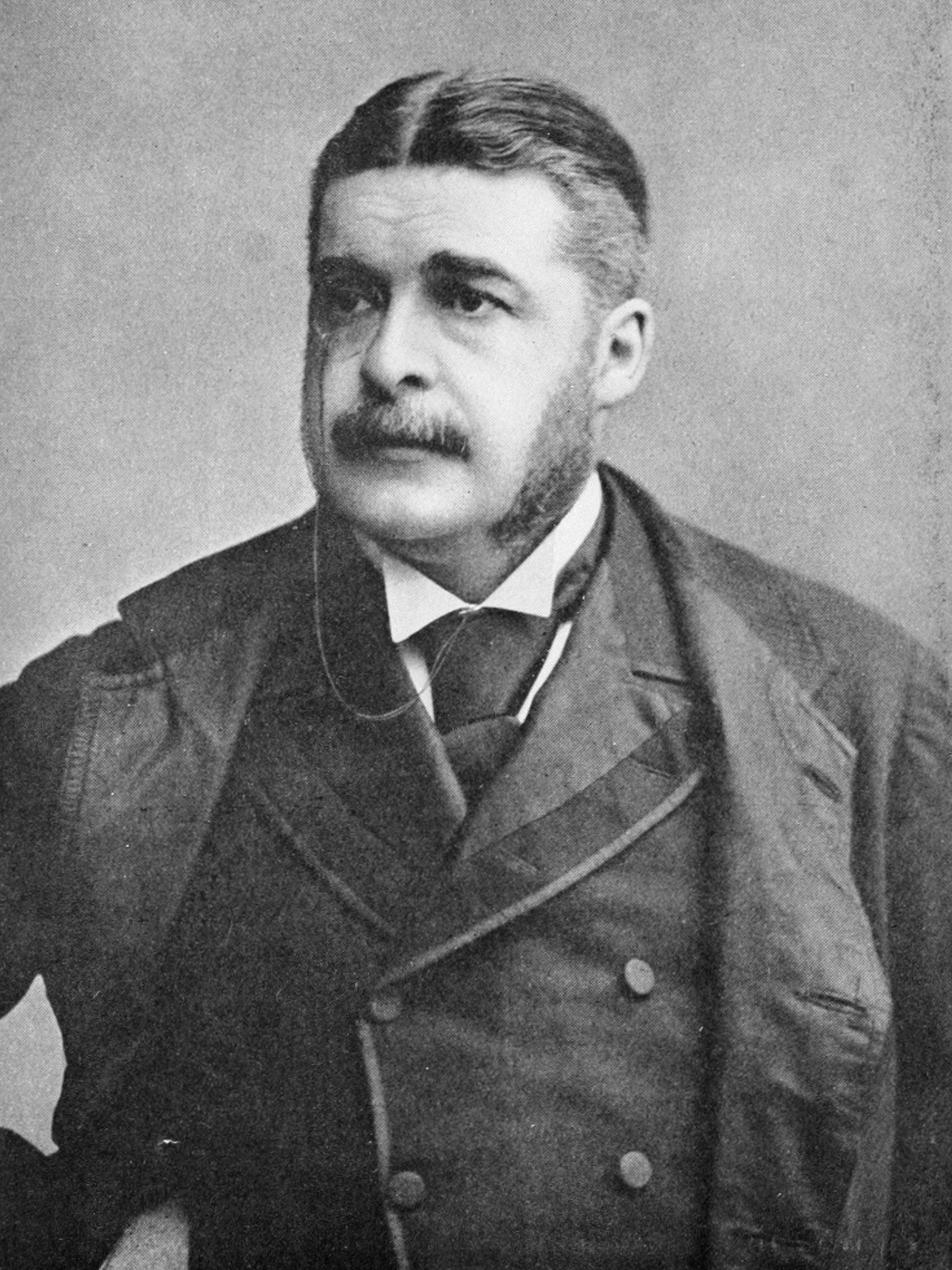
Sir Arthur Sullivan

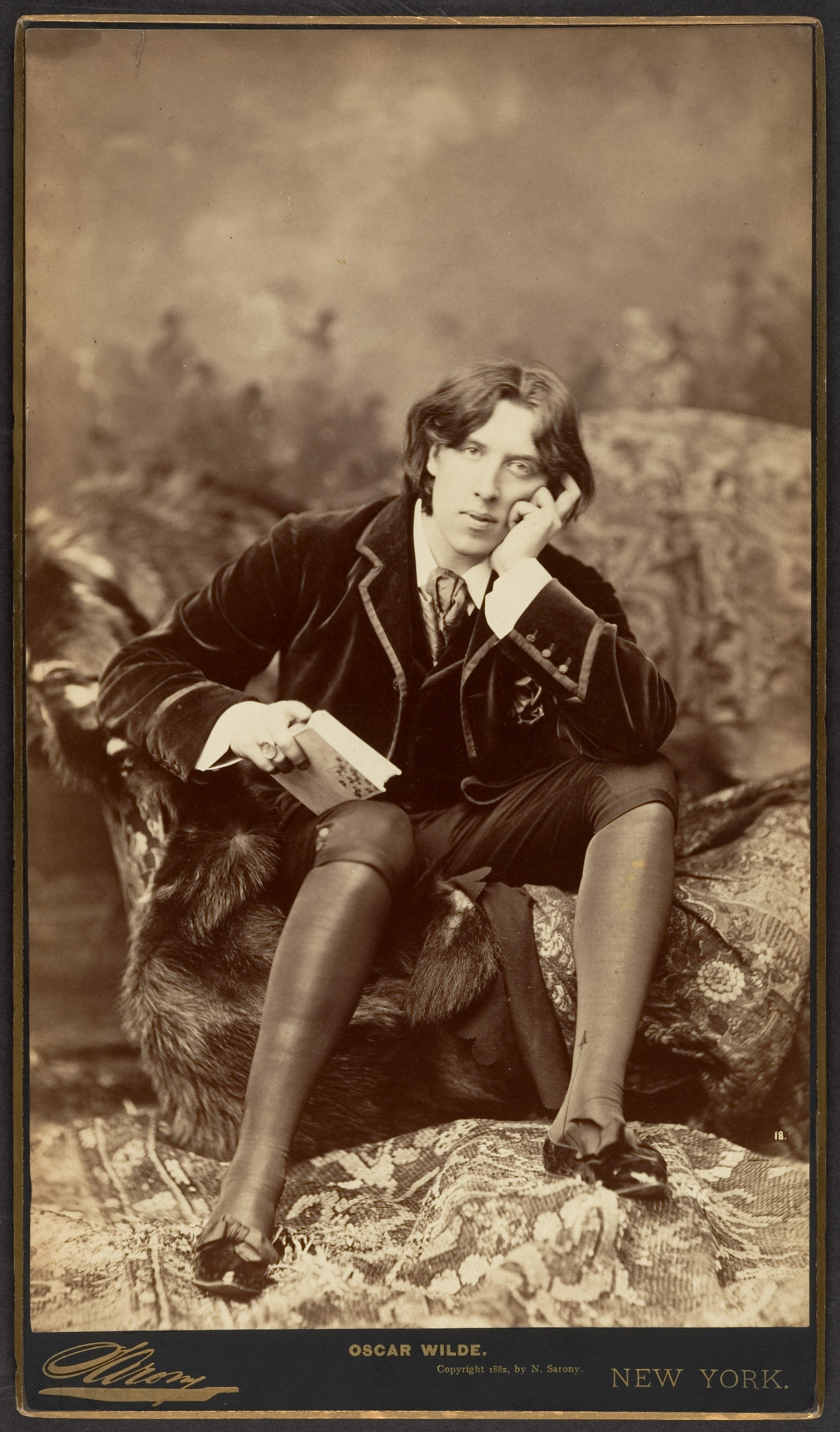
Oscar Wilde

- July 5 – Henry Barnard, American educationalist (b. 1811)
- July 8 – Henry D. Cogswell, American philanthropist (b. 1820)
- July 9 – Gregorio Grassi, Italian Franciscan friar, Roman Catholic martyr and saint (b. 1833)
- July 26 – Nicolae Kretzulescu, 2-time prime minister of Romania (b. 1812)
- July 29 – King Umberto I of Italy (assassinated) (b. 1844)
- July 30 – Alfred, Duke of Saxe-Coburg and Gotha, second son of Queen Victoria (b. 1844)
- August 1 – Rafael Molina Sanchez, Spanish bullfighter (b. 1841)
- August 4 – Étienne Lenoir, Belgian engineer (b. 1822)
- August 7 – Wilhelm Liebknecht, German Social Democratic politician (b. 1826)
- August 8
  - Emil Škoda, Czech engineer and industrialist (b. 1839)
  - József Szlávy, 6th prime minister of Hungary (b. 1818)
- August 10 – Charles Russell, Baron Russell of Killowen, Lord Chief Justice of England (b. 1832)
- August 12 – Wilhelm Steinitz, Austrian-born chess player, first undisputed World Champion (b. 1836)
- August 13 – Vladimir Solovyov, Russian philosopher and poet (b. 1853)
- August 16 – José Maria de Eça de Queirós, Portuguese writer (b. 1845)
- August 23 – Kuroda Kiyotaka, Japanese politician, 2nd Prime Minister of Japan (b. 1840)
- August 25 – Friedrich Nietzsche, German philosopher, writer (b. 1844)
- September 23
  - William Marsh Rice, American philanthropist, university founder (b. 1816)
  - Arsenio Martínez-Campos, Spanish general, revolutionary, and Prime Minister of Spain (b. 1831)
- September 29 – Samuel Fenton Cary, American politician (b. 1814)

=== October–December ===
- October 15 – Zdeněk Fibich, Czech composer (b. 1850)
- October 19 – Sir Roderick Cameron, Canadian shipping magnate (b. 1825)
- October 22 – John Sherman, American politician (b.1823)
- October 28 – Max Müller, German philologist, Orientalist (b. 1823)
- November 22 – Sir Arthur Sullivan, English composer (b. 1842)
- November 24 – Rafael Monleón y Torres, Spanish painter, archaeologist, and historian (b. 1843)
- November 26 – Méry Laurent, French artist's muse, model (b. 1849)
- November 30 – Oscar Wilde, Irish writer (b. 1854)
- December 4 – Aquileo Parra, 11th President of Colombia (b. 1825)
- December 14 – Paddy Ryan, Irish-American boxer, former world's heavyweight champion (b. 1851)
- December 21 – Leonhard Graf von Blumenthal, Prussian field marshal (b. 1810)

== World population ==
- World population: 1,640,000,000
  - Africa: 133,000,000
  - Asia: 947,000,000
    - Japan: c. 45,000,000
  - Europe: 408,000,000
  - Latin America: 74,000,000
  - Northern America: 82,000,000
  - Oceania: 6,000,000
