= James Richard Cocke =

American physician

James Richard Cocke (1863 – April 12, 1900), who had been blind since infancy, was an American physician, homeopath, and a pioneer hypnotherapist.

== Early life ==
He was born in the South of the United States, and had been totally blind since he was an infant. His sight had been completely destroyed when acid was accidentally applied to his eyes when he was just three weeks old.

He moved to Boston around 1885.

He was considered to be "highly educated"; and, despite his total blindness, "was able to go around the city at will", and "could play a piano with much skill":

Dr. James P.[sic] Cocke of Boston, though blind, is one of the most enthusiastic bicycle riders. He rides a duplicate with Mrs. Cocke.

== Marriages ==
Once he had moved to Boston, he married a Mrs. Green of Springfield, Massachusetts:

They did not live long together, and at a subsequent court trial it was proved that before getting a divorce Cocke married a Miss Townsend of Hartford, Conn. His second wife left him, and in the resulting litigation Cocke lost all his money, his standing as a physician, and came so near losing his mind that he was confined for a time in a city institution in Boston Harbor. Four months ago [viz., December 1899] he returned to the city [of Boston] and married a Miss Carlotta Harrington of Ohio …

Miss Harrington, aged 23, was a medical student, and had been acting as Cocke's amanuensis.

They had only been married for about seven weeks at the time of Cocke's suicide in April 1900.

== Medical career ==
Having moved to Boston around 1885, he graduated M.D. from Boston University in June 1892, "having completed the full course of study [including performing dissections], with an average percentage of 96 for the three years". He was the first blind person to do so.

He was a member of the Medico-Legal Society of New York.

Although he studied homeopathy for a time, he made his mark as a student of hypnotism, and as a successful hypnotherapist.

He wrote an important text-book on hypnotism in 1894.

== Death ==
He was found dead by his wife on 12 April 1900, with a pistol placed in his mouth and a bullet in the back of his head.

The coroner's verdict was suicide.

== Works ==
- Cocke, J.R. (1893), "The Practical Application of Hypnotism in Modern Medicine", The Arena, Vol.9, No.1, (December 1893), pp. 73–80.
- Cocke, J.R. (1894a), Hypnotism: How it is Done; Its Uses and Dangers, Arena Publishing Co., (Boston), 1894.
- Cocke, J.R. (1894b), "The Power of the Mind as a Remedial Agent in the Cure of Disease", The Arena, Vol.9, No.6, (May 1894), pp. 746–757.
- Cocke, J.R. (1894c), "The Value of Hypnotism as a Means of Surgical Anæsthesia", The Arena, Vol.10, No.58, (August 1894), pp. 289-296.
- Cocke, J.R. (1895), "Methods of Inducing Hypnotism", Current Literature, Vol.17, No.5, (May 1895), pp. 443–444.
- Cocke, J.R. (1896), Blind Leaders of the Blind: The Romance of a Blind Lawyer, Lee and Shepard, (Boston), 1896.
