= July 7 =

July 7 this year in various calendars
- Tuesday, 7 July 2026
Akan	Kurubene
Armenian	22 Hrotich 1475
Aztec	Tepeilhuitl 18, 10 Miquiztli
Babylonian	21 Simanu, 2337 SE
Balinese pawukon	Luang, Pepet, Pasah, Menala, Keliwon, Paniron, Anggara of Medangsia, Yama, Dangu, Pati
Bengali	23 Asharh, BS 1433
Chinese	Yang Water Horse・Encampment Mansion; Fire Horse Year, Month 5, Day 23 (Xiaoshu, 16 days until Dashu)
Common Era	7 July 2026 CE
Coptic	30 Paoni, AM 1742
Egyptian	22 Athyr, 2775 NE
Ethiopian	30 Sanē, 2018 Amätä Məhrät
French Republican	Décade II, Nonidi de Messidor de l'Année 234 de la République
Gregorian	7 July, AD 2026
Hebrew	22 Tamuz, AM 5786
Hindu	Uttarabhādrapada・Śobhana; Solar: 23 Āṣāḍha, 1948 SE; Lunisolar: Saptamī, Kṛishna pakṣa of Jyeṣṭha, 2083 VE; Rāudra・5127 KY・1,872,763
Icelandic	Þriðjudagur, 16 Sólmánuður 2026
Islamic	21 Muharram, AH 1448 (using tabular method)
ISO week date	2026-W28-2
Japanese	23 Satsuki, Reiwa 8 (Shōsho, 16 days until Taisho)
Julian	24 June, AD 2026 (AM 7534)
Julian day	2461229
Korean	23 Maldal, 4359 DE
Maya	13.0.13.13.6; 19 Tzec, 10 Cimi
Roman	ante diem VIII Kalendas Iulias, MMDCCLXXIX AUC
Solar Hijri	16 Tir, SH 1405
Tibetan	22 snron, me pho rta 2153 or 1772 or 1000

<<	July					>>
Su	Mo	Tu	We	Th	Fr	Sa
			1	2	3	4
5	6	7	8	9	10	11
12	13	14	15	16	17	18
19	20	21	22	23	24	25
26	27	28	29	30	31
2026

July 7 in recent years
2026 (Tuesday)
2025 (Monday)
2024 (Sunday)
2023 (Friday)
2022 (Thursday)
2021 (Wednesday)
2020 (Tuesday)
2019 (Sunday)
2018 (Saturday)
2017 (Friday)

July 7 is the 188th day of the year (189th in leap years) in the Gregorian calendar; 177 days remain until the end of the year.

== Events ==
=== Pre-1600 ===
- 1124 – The city of Tyre falls to the Venetian Crusade after a siege of 19 weeks.
- 1456 – A retrial verdict acquits Joan of Arc of heresy 25 years after her execution.
- 1520 – Spanish conquistadores defeat a larger Aztec army at the Battle of Otumba.
- 1534 – Jacques Cartier makes his first contact with aboriginal peoples in what is now Canada.
- 1548 – Scotland and France conclude the Treaty of Haddington in response to the war known as the "Rough Wooing". According to the treaty, the five-year-old Mary, Queen of Scots, is to marry the Dauphin of France.
- 1575 – The Raid of the Redeswire is the last major battle between England and Scotland.
- 1585 – The Treaty of Nemours abolishes tolerance to Protestants in France.

=== 1601–1900 ===
- 1667 – An English fleet completes the destruction of a French merchant fleet off Fort St Pierre, Martinique during the Second Anglo-Dutch War.
- 1770 – The Battle of Larga between the Russian Empire and the Ottoman Empire takes place.
- 1770 – After three days of battle around Chesma, the Russian fleet defeats the Ottoman Navy, inflicting one of the most severe naval defeats on the Ottoman Empire since Lepanto.
- 1777 – American forces retreating from Fort Ticonderoga are defeated in the Battle of Hubbardton.
- 1798 – As a result of the XYZ Affair, the US Congress rescinds the Treaty of Alliance with France sparking the "Quasi-War".
- 1807 – The first Treaty of Tilsit between France and Russia is signed, ending hostilities between the two countries in the War of the Fourth Coalition.
- 1834 – In New York City, four nights of rioting against abolitionists began.
- 1846 – US troops occupy Monterey and Yerba Buena, thus beginning the US conquest of California.
- 1863 – The United States begins its first military draft; exemptions cost $300.
- 1865 – Four conspirators in the assassination of Abraham Lincoln are hanged.
- 1892 – The Katipunan is established, the discovery of which by Spanish authorities initiated the Philippine Revolution.
- 1898 – US president William McKinley signs the Newlands Resolution, annexing Hawaii as a territory of the United States.
- 1900 – The luxury racing yacht Idler capsizes and sinks on Lake Erie during a storm, drowning six of its seven passengers (all members of the family of Cleveland businessman James C. Corrigan).

=== 1901–present ===
- 1907 – Florenz Ziegfeld Jr. staged his first Follies on the roof of the New York Theater in New York City.
- 1911 – The United States, UK, Japan, and Russia sign the North Pacific Fur Seal Convention of 1911 banning open-water seal hunting, the first international treaty to address wildlife preservation issues.
- 1915 – World War I: The First Battle of the Isonzo between Italy and Austria-Hungary comes to an end.
- 1915 – Colombo Town Guard officer Henry Pedris is executed in British Ceylon for allegedly inciting persecution of Muslims.
- 1916 – The New Zealand Labour Party was founded in Wellington.
- 1928 – Sliced bread is sold for the first time (on the inventor's 48th birthday) by the Chillicothe Baking Company of Chillicothe, Missouri.
- 1930 – Industrialist Henry J. Kaiser begins construction of Boulder Dam (now known as Hoover Dam).
- 1930 – The Finnish far-right Lapua Movement organises the Peasant March demonstration in Helsinki to put pressure on the government to prohibit communist activities.
- 1937 – The Marco Polo Bridge Incident (Lugou Bridge) provides the Imperial Japanese Army with a pretext for starting the Second Sino-Japanese War (China-Japan War).
- 1937 – The Peel Commission Report recommends the partition of Palestine, which was the first formal recommendation for partition in the history of Palestine.
- 1941 – The US occupation of Iceland replaces the UK's occupation.
- 1944 – World War II: Largest Banzai charge of the Pacific War at the Battle of Saipan.
- 1946 – Mother Francesca S. Cabrini becomes the first American to be canonized.
- 1946 – Howard Hughes nearly dies when his XF-11 reconnaissance aircraft prototype crashes in a Beverly Hills neighborhood.
- 1952 – The ocean liner SS United States passes Bishop Rock on her maiden voyage, breaking the transatlantic speed record to become the fastest passenger ship in the world.
- 1953 – Ernesto "Che" Guevara sets out on a trip through Bolivia, Peru, Ecuador, Panama, Costa Rica, Nicaragua, Honduras, and El Salvador.
- 1958 – US President Dwight D. Eisenhower signs the Alaska Statehood Act into law.
- 1959 – Venus occults the star Regulus. This rare event is used to determine the diameter of Venus and the structure of the Venusian atmosphere.
- 1962 – Alitalia Flight 771 crashes in Junnar, Maharashtra, India, killing 94 people.
- 1963 – Buddhist crisis: Police commanded by Ngô Đình Nhu, brother and chief political adviser of South Vietnam President Ngo Dinh Diem, attacked a group of American journalists who were covering a protest.
- 1978 – The Solomon Islands becomes independent from the United Kingdom.
- 1980 – Institution of sharia law in Iran.
- 1980 – During the Lebanese Civil War, 83 Tiger militants are killed during what will be known as the Safra massacre.
- 1981 – US President Ronald Reagan nominates Sandra Day O'Connor to become the first female member of the Supreme Court of the United States.
- 1983 – Cold War: Samantha Smith, a United States schoolgirl, flies to the Soviet Union at the invitation of Secretary General Yuri Andropov.
- 1985 – Boris Becker becomes the youngest male player ever to win Wimbledon at age 17.
- 1991 – Yugoslav Wars: The Brioni Agreement ends the ten-day independence war in Slovenia against the rest of the Socialist Federal Republic of Yugoslavia.
- 1992 – The New York Court of Appeals rules that women have the same right as men to go topless in public.
- 1997 – The Turkish Armed Forces withdraw from northern Iraq after assisting the Kurdistan Democratic Party in the Iraqi Kurdish Civil War.
- 2003 – NASA Opportunity rover, MER-B or Mars Exploration Rover–B, was launched into space aboard a Delta II rocket.
- 2005 – A series of four explosions occurs on London's transport system, killing 56 people, including four suicide bombers, and injuring over 700 others.
- 2006 – A shootout happens in Spiritwood, Canada, killing two Royal Canadian Mounted Police and wounding a third officer.
- 2007 – The first Live Earth benefit concert was held in 11 locations around the world.
- 2011 – A man goes on a killing spree in Grand Rapids, Michigan, killing seven and wounding two before killing himself.
- 2012 – At least 172 people are killed in a flash flood in the Krasnodar Krai region of Russia.
- 2013 – A De Havilland Otter air taxi crashes in Soldotna, Alaska, killing ten people.
- 2016 – Ex-US Army soldier Micah Xavier Johnson shoots fourteen policemen, killing five of them, in downtown Dallas, Texas at the end of a protest of recent police killings of Black men. He is subsequently killed by a robot-delivered bomb.
- 2017 – The Treaty on the Prohibition of Nuclear Weapons was adopted with 122 countries voting in favour.
- 2019 – The United States defeated the Netherlands 2–0 at the 2019 FIFA Women's World Cup final in Lyon, France.
- 2021 – Haitian crisis: Haitian President Jovenel Moïse is assassinated in his residence in the capital of Port-au-Prince.
- 2022 – Boris Johnson announces his resignation as leader of the Conservative Party following days of pressure from the Members of Parliament (MPs) during the July 2022 United Kingdom government crisis.

== Births ==
=== Pre-1600 ===
- 611 – Eudoxia Epiphania, daughter of Byzantine emperor Heraclius
- 1053 – Emperor Shirakawa of Japan (died 1129)
- 1119 – Emperor Sutoku of Japan (died 1164)
- 1207 – Elizabeth of Hungary (died 1231)
- 1482 – Andrzej Krzycki, Polish archbishop (died 1537)
- 1528 – Archduchess Anna of Austria (died 1590)
- 1540 – John Sigismund Zápolya, King of Hungary (died 1571)
- 1585 – Thomas Howard, 21st Earl of Arundel, English courtier and politician, Lord Lieutenant of Northumberland (died 1646)
- 1588 – Wolrad IV, Count of Waldeck-Eisenberg (died 1640)

=== 1601–1900 ===
- 1616 – John Leverett, Governor of Massachusetts Bay Colony (died 1679)
- 1752 – Joseph Marie Jacquard, French merchant, invented the Jacquard loom (died 1834)
- 1766 – Guillaume Philibert Duhesme, French general (died 1815)
- 1831 – Jane Elizabeth Conklin, American poet and religious writer (died 1914)
- 1833 – Félicien Rops, Belgian painter and illustrator (died 1898)
- 1843 – Camillo Golgi, Italian physician and pathologist, Nobel Prize laureate (died 1926)
- 1846 – Heinrich Rosenthal, Estonian physician and author (died 1916)
- 1848 – Rodrigues Alves, Brazilian politician, 5th President of Brazil (died 1919)
- 1851 – Charles Albert Tindley, American minister and composer (died 1933)
- 1855 – Ludwig Ganghofer, German author and playwright (died 1920)
- 1859 – Rettamalai Srinivasan, Indian politician (died 1945)
- 1860 – Gustav Mahler, Austrian composer and conductor (died 1911)
- 1861 – Nettie Stevens, American geneticist (died 1912)
- 1869 – Rachel Caroline Eaton, American academic (died 1938)
- 1869 – Fernande Sadler, French painter and mayor (died 1949)
- 1874 – Erwin Bumke, German lawyer and jurist (died 1945)
- 1880 – Otto Frederick Rohwedder, American engineer, invented sliced bread (died 1960)
- 1882 – Yanka Kupala, Belarusian poet and writer (died 1941)
- 1883 – Toivo Kuula, Finnish conductor and composer (died 1918)
- 1884 – Lion Feuchtwanger, German author and playwright (died 1958)
- 1891 – Tadamichi Kuribayashi, Japanese general and poet (died 1945)
- 1891 – Virginia Rappe, American model and actress (died 1921)
- 1893 – Herbert Feis, American historian and author (died 1972)
- 1893 – Miroslav Krleža, Croatian author, poet, and playwright (died 1981)
- 1898 – Arnold Horween, American football player and coach (died 1985)
- 1899 – George Cukor, American director and producer (died 1983)
- 1900 – Maria Bard, German stage and silent film actress (died 1944)
- 1900 – Earle E. Partridge, American general (died 1990)

=== 1901–present ===
- 1901 – Sam Katzman, American director and producer (died 1973)
- 1901 – Vittorio De Sica, Italian actor and director (died 1974)
- 1901 – Eiji Tsuburaya, Japanese cinematographer and producer (died 1970)
- 1902 – Ted Radcliffe, American baseball player and manager (died 2005)
- 1904 – Simone Beck, French chef and author (died 1991)
- 1905 – Marie-Louise Dubreil-Jacotin, French mathematician (died 1972)
- 1906 – William Feller, Croatian-American mathematician and academic (died 1970)
- 1906 – Anton Karas, Austrian zither player and composer (died 1985)
- 1906 – Satchel Paige, American baseball player and coach (died 1982)
- 1907 – Robert A. Heinlein, American science fiction writer and screenwriter (died 1988)
- 1908 – Evert Willem Beth, Dutch mathematician and philosopher (died 1964)
- 1908 – Revilo P. Oliver, American author and academic (died 1994)
- 1909 – Gottfried von Cramm, German tennis player (died 1976)
- 1910 – Doris McCarthy, Canadian painter and author (died 2010)
- 1911 – Gian Carlo Menotti, Italian-American composer (died 2007)
- 1913 – Pinetop Perkins, American singer and pianist (died 2011)
- 1915 – Margaret Walker, American novelist and poet (died 1998)
- 1916 – Tiny Grimes, American jazz and R&B guitarist (died 1989)
- 1917 – Fidel Sánchez Hernández, Salvadoran general and politician, President of El Salvador (died 2003)
- 1917 – Red Sovine, "Red" Sovine, American country music singer and songwriter (died 1980)
- 1917 – Iva Withers, Canadian-American actress and singer (died 2014)
- 1918 – Bob Vanatta, American head basketball coach (died 2016)
- 1918 – Jing Shuping, Chinese businessman (died 2009)
- 1919 – William Kunstler, American defense attorney (defended the Chicago 7) (died 1995)
- 1919 – Jon Pertwee, English actor (died 1996)
- 1921 – Ezzard Charles, American boxer (died 1975)
- 1921 – Adolf von Thadden, German lieutenant and politician (died 1996)
- 1922 – Alan Armer, American director, producer, and screenwriter (died 2010)
- 1922 – James D. Hughes, American Air Force lieutenant general (died 2024)
- 1923 – Liviu Ciulei, Romanian actor, director, and screenwriter (died 2011)
- 1923 – Whitney North Seymour Jr., American politician (died 2019)
- 1923 – Eduardo Falú, Argentinian guitarist and composer (died 2013)
- 1924 – Natalia Bekhtereva, Russian neuroscientist and psychologist (died 2008)
- 1924 – Mary Ford, American singer and guitarist (died 1977)
- 1924 – Karim Olowu, Nigerian sprinter and long jumper (died 2019)
- 1924 – Eddie Romero, Filipino director, producer, screenwriter, and National Artist for Cinema and Broadcast Arts (died 2013)
- 1925 – Geliy Korzhev, Russian painter (died 2012)
- 1925 – Wally Phillips, American radio host (died 2008)
- 1926 – Nuon Chea, Cambodian politician (died 2019)
- 1926 – Anand Mohan Zutshi Gulzar Dehlvi, Urdu poet (died 2020)
- 1927 – Alan J. Dixon, American lawyer and politician, 34th Illinois Secretary of State (died 2014)
- 1927 – Charlie Louvin, American singer-songwriter and guitarist (died 2011)
- 1927 – Doc Severinsen, American trumpet player and conductor
- 1928 – Patricia Hitchcock, English actress (died 2021)
- 1928 – Kapelwa Sikota Zambian nurse and health official (died 2006)
- 1929 – Hasan Abidi, Pakistani journalist and poet (died 2005)
- 1929 – Sergio Romano, Italian writer, journalist, and historian
- 1930 – Hamish MacInnes, Scottish mountaineer and author (died 2020)
- 1930 – Theodore McCarrick, American former cardinal (died 2025)
- 1930 – Hank Mobley, American saxophonist and composer (died 1986)
- 1930 – Biljana Plavšić, 2nd President of Republika Srpska (died 2026)
- 1931 – David Eddings, American author and academic (died 2009)
- 1932 – T. J. Bass, American physician and author (died 2011)
- 1932 – Joe Zawinul, Austrian jazz keyboardist and composer (died 2007)
- 1933 – David McCullough, American historian and author (died 2022)
- 1934 – Robert McNeill Alexander, British zoologist (died 2016)
- 1935 – Gian Carlo Michelini, Italian-Taiwanese Roman Catholic priest (died 2026)
- 1936 – Egbert Brieskorn, German mathematician and academic (died 2013)
- 1936 – Jo Siffert, Swiss race car driver (died 1971)
- 1936 – Nikos Xilouris, Greek singer-songwriter (died 1980)
- 1937 – Tung Chee-hwa, Hong Kong businessman and politician, 1st Chief Executive of Hong Kong (died 2026)
- 1938 – James Montgomery Boice, American pastor and theologian (died 2000)
- 1939 – Elena Obraztsova, Russian soprano and actress (died 2015)
- 1940 – Ringo Starr, English singer-songwriter, drummer, and actor
- 1941 – Marco Bollesan, Italian rugby player and coach (died 2021)
- 1941 – Michael Howard, Welsh lawyer and politician
- 1941 – John Fru Ndi, Cameroonian politician (died 2023)
- 1941 – Bill Oddie, English comedian, actor, and singer (died 2026)
- 1941 – Jim Rodford, English bass player (died 2018)
- 1942 – Carmen Duncan, Australian actress (died 2019)
- 1943 – Joel Siegel, American journalist and critic (died 2007)
- 1944 – Tony Jacklin, English golfer and sportscaster
- 1944 – Glenys Kinnock, English educator and politician (died 2023)
- 1944 – Feleti Sevele, Tongan politician; Prime Minister of Tonga
- 1944 – Emanuel Steward, American boxer and trainer (died 2012)
- 1944 – Ian Wilmut, English-Scottish embryologist and academic (died 2023)
- 1945 – Michael Ancram, English lawyer and politician (died 2024)
- 1945 – Adele Goldberg, American computer scientist and academic
- 1945 – Helô Pinheiro, inspiration for the song "The Girl from Ipanema"
- 1947 – Gyanendra, King of Nepal
- 1947 – Howard Rheingold, American author and critic
- 1949 – Shelley Duvall, American actress, writer, and producer (died 2024)
- 1954 – Simon Anderson, Australian surfer
- 1955 – Len Barker, American baseball player and coach
- 1957 – Jonathan Dayton, American director and producer
- 1957 – Berry Sakharof, Turkish-Israeli singer-songwriter and guitarist
- 1958 – Alexander Svinin, Russian figure skater and coach
- 1959 – Billy Campbell, American actor
- 1960 – Kevin A. Ford, American colonel and astronaut
- 1960 – Ralph Sampson, American basketball player and coach
- 1963 – Vonda Shepard, American singer-songwriter and actress
- 1964 – Dominik Henzel, Czech-Swedish actor and comedian
- 1965 – Mo Collins, American actress, comedian and screenwriter
- 1965 – Jeremy Kyle, English talk show host
- 1966 – Jim Gaffigan, American comedian, actor, producer, and screenwriter
- 1967 – Tom Kristensen, Danish race car driver
- 1968 – Jorja Fox, American actress
- 1969 – Sylke Otto, German luger
- 1969 – Joe Sakic, Canadian ice hockey player
- 1969 – Cree Summer, American-Canadian actress
- 1970 – Wayne McCullough, Northern Irish boxer
- 1970 – Min Patel, Indian-English cricketer
- 1970 – Erik Zabel, German cyclist and coach
- 1971 – Christian Camargo, American actor, producer, and screenwriter
- 1972 – Lisa Leslie, American basketball player and actress
- 1972 – Manfred Stohl, Austrian race car driver
- 1972 – Kirsten Vangsness, American actress and writer
- 1973 – José Jiménez, Dominican baseball player
- 1974 – Patrick Lalime, Canadian ice hockey player and sportscaster
- 1975 – Tony Benshoof, American luger
- 1975 – Louis Koen, South African rugby player
- 1975 – Adam Nelson, American shot putter
- 1976 – Bérénice Bejo, Argentinian-French actress
- 1976 – Dominic Foley, Irish footballer
- 1976 – Hamish Linklater, American actor and playwright
- 1976 – Ercüment Olgundeniz, Turkish discus thrower and shot putter
- 1976 – Vasily Petrenko, Russian conductor
- 1978 – Chris Andersen, American basketball player
- 1978 – Davor Kraljević, Croatian footballer
- 1979 – Ibrahim Sulayman Muhammad Arbaysh, Saudi Arabian terrorist (died 2015)
- 1979 – Anastasios Gousis, Greek sprinter
- 1979 – Douglas Hondo, Zimbabwean cricketer
- 1980 – John Buck, American baseball player
- 1980 – Serdar Kulbilge, Turkish footballer
- 1980 – Michelle Kwan, American figure skater
- 1981 – Mahendra Singh Dhoni, Indian cricketer
- 1981 – Synyster Gates, American guitarist
- 1982 – Jan Laštůvka, Czech footballer
- 1982 – George Owu, Ghanaian footballer
- 1982 – Asia O'Hara, American drag performer
- 1983 – Justin Davies, Australian footballer
- 1984 – Minas Alozidis, Greek hurdler
- 1984 – Alberto Aquilani, Italian footballer
- 1984 – Mohammad Ashraful, Bangladeshi cricketer
- 1985 – Marc Stein, German footballer
- 1986 – Ana Kasparian, American journalist and producer
- 1986 – Udo Schwarz, German rugby player
- 1986 – Sevyn Streeter, American singer-songwriter
- 1988 – Kaci Brown, American singer-songwriter
- 1988 – Lukas Rosenthal, German rugby player
- 1989 – Landon Cassill, American race car driver
- 1989 – Miina Kallas, Estonian footballer
- 1989 – Karl-August Tiirmaa, Estonian skier
- 1990 – Lee Addy, Ghanaian footballer
- 1990 – Pascal Stöger, Austrian footballer
- 1991 – Alesso, Swedish DJ, record producer and musician
- 1992 – Ellina Anissimova, Estonian hammer thrower
- 1992 – Dominik Furman, Polish footballer
- 1994 – Nigina Abduraimova, Uzbekistani tennis player
- 1994 – Timothy Cathcart, Northern Irish race car driver (died 2014)
- 1994 – Ashton Irwin, Australian musician
- 1996 – Yoon Chae-kyung, South Korean singer and actress
- 1997 – Mizuho Habu, Japanese idol and model
- 1997 – James Marriott, English musician and online content creator
- 1999 – Moussa Diaby, French footballer
- 2005 – Ron Holland, American basketball player

== Deaths ==
=== Pre-1600 ===
- 984 – Crescentius the Elder, Italian politician and aristocrat
- 1021 – Fujiwara no Akimitsu, Japanese bureaucrat (born 944)
- 1162 – Haakon II Sigurdsson, king of Norway (born 1147)
- 1285 – Tile Kolup, German impostor claiming to be Frederick II
- 1304 – Benedict XI, pope of the Catholic Church (born 1240)
- 1307 – Edward I, king of England (born 1239)
- 1345 – Momchil, Bulgarian brigand and ruler
- 1531 – Tilman Riemenschneider, German sculptor (born 1460)
- 1568 – William Turner, British ornithologist and botanist (born 1508)
- 1572 – Sigismund II Augustus, Polish king (born 1520)
- 1573 – Giacomo Barozzi da Vignola, Italian architect, designed the Church of the Gesù and Villa Farnese (born 1507)
- 1593 – Mohammed Bagayogo, Malian scholar and academic (born 1523)
- 1600 – Thomas Lucy, English politician (born 1532)

=== 1601–1900 ===
- 1607 – Penelope Blount, Countess of Devonshire, English noblewoman (born 1563)
- 1647 – Thomas Hooker, English minister, founded the Colony of Connecticut (born 1586)
- 1701 – William Stoughton, American judge and politician, Governor of the Province of Massachusetts Bay (born 1631)
- 1713 – Henry Compton, English bishop (born 1632)
- 1718 – Alexei Petrovich, Russian tsarevich (born 1690)
- 1730 – Olivier Levasseur, French pirate (born 1690)
- 1758 – Marthanda Varma, Raja of Attingal (born 1706)
- 1764 – William Pulteney, 1st Earl of Bath, English politician, Secretary at War (born 1683)
- 1776 – Jeremiah Markland, English scholar and academic (born 1693)
- 1790 – François Hemsterhuis, Dutch philosopher and author (born 1721)
- 1816 – Richard Brinsley Sheridan, Irish playwright and poet (born 1751)
- 1863 – William Mulready, Irish genre painter (born 1786)
- 1865 – Assassination of Abraham Lincoln: execution of convicted conspirators
  - George Atzerodt (born 1833)
  - David Herold (born 1842)
  - Lewis Powell (born 1844)
  - Mary Surratt (born 1823)
- 1890 – Henri Nestlé, German businessman, founded Nestlé (born 1814)

=== 1901–present ===
- 1901 – Johanna Spyri, Swiss author (born 1827)
- 1913 – Edward Burd Grubb Jr., American general and diplomat, United States Ambassador to Spain (born 1841)
- 1922 – Cathal Brugha, Irish revolutionary and politician, active in the Easter Rising, Irish War of Independence; first Ceann Comhairle and first President of Dáil Éireann (born 1874)
- 1925 – Clarence Hudson White, American photographer and educator (born 1871)
- 1927 – Gösta Mittag-Leffler, Swedish mathematician and academic (born 1846)
- 1930 – Arthur Conan Doyle, British writer, creator of Sherlock Holmes (born 1859)
- 1932 – Henry Eyster Jacobs, American theologian and educator (born 1844)
- 1939 – Deacon White, American baseball player and manager (born 1847)
- 1950 – Fats Navarro, American trumpet player and composer (born 1923)
- 1955 – Ali Naci Karacan, Turkish journalist and publisher (born 1896)
- 1956 – Gottfried Benn, German author and poet (born 1886)
- 1960 – Francis Browne, Irish priest and photographer (born 1880)
- 1964 – Lillian Copeland, American discus thrower and shot putter (born 1904)
- 1965 – Moshe Sharett, Ukrainian-Israeli lieutenant and politician, 2nd Prime Minister of Israel (born 1894)
- 1968 – Jo Schlesser, French race car driver (born 1928)
- 1970 – Dame Laura Knight, English artist (born 1877)
- 1971 – Claude Gauvreau, Canadian poet and playwright (born 1925)
- 1972 – Athenagoras I of Constantinople (born 1886)
- 1973 – Max Horkheimer, German philosopher and sociologist (born 1895)
- 1973 – Veronica Lake, American actress (born 1922)
- 1978 – Francisco Mendes, Guinea-Bissau lawyer and politician, 1st Prime Minister of Guinea-Bissau (born 1933)
- 1980 – Dore Schary, American director, producer, and screenwriter (born 1905)
- 1982 – Bon Maharaja, Indian guru and religious writer (born 1901)
- 1984 – George Oppen, American poet and author (born 1908)
- 1987 – Germaine Thyssens-Valentin, Dutch-French pianist (born 1902)
- 1990 – Bill Cullen, American television panelist and game show host (born 1920)
- 1990 – Cazuza, Brazilian singer and songwriter (born 1958)
- 1993 – Rıfat Ilgaz, Turkish author, poet, and educator (born 1911)
- 1993 – Mia Zapata, American singer (born 1965)
- 1994 – Carlo Chiti, Italian engineer (born 1924)
- 1994 – Friedrich August Freiherr von der Heydte, German general (born 1907)
- 1998 – Moshood Abiola, Nigerian businessman and politician (born 1937)
- 1999 – Vikram Batra, Param Vir Chakra, Indian Army personnel (born 1974)
- 1999 – Julie Campbell Tatham, American author (born 1908)
- 2000 – Kenny Irwin Jr., American race car driver (born 1969)
- 2001 – Fred Neil, American singer-songwriter and guitarist (born 1936)
- 2003 – Izhak Graziani, Bulgarian trumpet player and conductor (born 1924)
- 2006 – Syd Barrett, English singer-songwriter and guitarist (born 1946)
- 2006 – Juan de Ávalos, Spanish sculptor (born 1911)
- 2006 – John Money, New Zealand-American psychologist and author (born 1921)
- 2007 – Anne McLaren, British scientist (born 1927)
- 2007 – Donald Michie, British scientist (born 1923)
- 2008 – Bruce Conner, American sculptor, painter, and photographer (born 1933)
- 2008 – Dorian Leigh, American model (born 1917)
- 2011 – Allan W. Eckert, American historian and author (born 1931)
- 2011 – Dick Williams, American baseball player, coach, and manager (born 1929)
- 2012 – Dennis Flemion, American drummer (born 1955)
- 2012 – Ronaldo Cunha Lima, Brazilian poet and politician (born 1936)
- 2012 – Doris Neal, American baseball player (born 1928)
- 2012 – Jerry Norman, American sinologist and linguist (born 1936)
- 2012 – Leon Schlumpf, Swiss politician (born 1927)
- 2013 – Artur Hajzer, Polish mountaineer (born 1962)
- 2013 – Robert Hamerton-Kelly, South African-American pastor, theologian, and author (born 1938)
- 2013 – Donald J. Irwin, American lawyer and politician, 32nd Mayor of Norwalk, Connecticut (born 1926)
- 2013 – Ben Pucci, American football player and sportscaster (born 1925)
- 2014 – Alfredo Di Stéfano, Argentinian-Spanish footballer and coach (born 1926)
- 2014 – Eduard Shevardnadze, Georgian general and politician, 2nd President of Georgia (born 1928)
- 2014 – Peter Underwood, Australian lawyer and politician, 27th Governor of Tasmania (born 1937)
- 2015 – Maria Barroso, Portuguese actress and politician (born 1925)
- 2015 – Bob MacKinnon, American basketball player and coach (born 1927)
- 2021 – Robert Downey Sr., American actor and director (born 1936)
- 2021 – Dilip Kumar, Indian film actor (born 1922)
- 2021 – Jovenel Moïse, Haitian entrepreneur and politician, President of Haiti (born 1968)
- 2024 – Jane McAlevey, American labor organizer and author (born 1964)
- 2025 – Wayne Dobson, English magician (born 1957)
- 2025 – Roman Starovoyt, Russian politician (born 1972)
- 2025 – Norman Tebbit, English journalist and politician, Chancellor of the Duchy of Lancaster (born 1931)

== Holidays and observances ==
- Christian feast day:
  - Æthelburh of Faremoutiers
  - Felix of Nantes
  - Illidius
  - Job of Manyava (Ukrainian Orthodox Church)
  - Blessed María Romero Meneses
  - Pantaenus
  - Peter To Rot
  - Blesseds Józef and Wiktoria Ulma with seven children (Catholic Church)
  - Willibald (Catholic Church)
  - July 7 (Eastern Orthodox liturgics)
- Independence Day, celebrates the independence of Solomon Islands from the United Kingdom in 1978.
- Ivan Kupala Day (Belarus, Poland, Russia, Ukraine)
- Saba Saba Day (Tanzania)
- Tanabata (Japan)
- World Chocolate Day
