= Dominik Henzel =

Czech-born Swedish actor and comedian (born 1964)

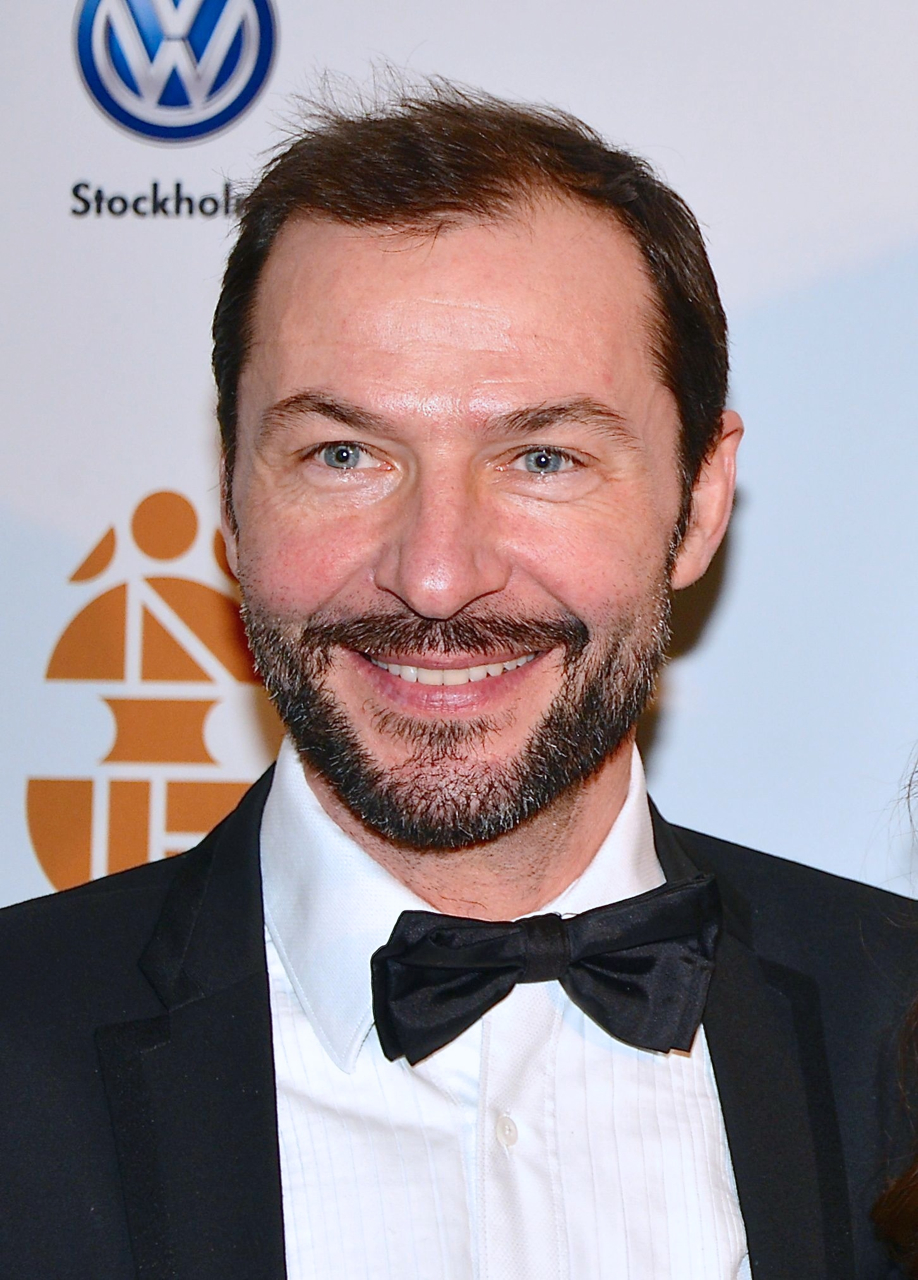
- Henzel at the Guldbagge Awards in January 2013
- Born: 7 July 1964 (age 61); Prague, Czechoslovakia
- Occupations: Actor; comedian
- Years active: 1979–present

Dominik Henzel (born 7 July 1964) is a Czech-born Swedish actor and comedian. He has starred in at least 18 Swedish films and television series during a career that began in 1979. Henzel has also appeared in a number of television commercials and works as a stand-up comedian.

== Early life ==
Henzel was born on 7 July 1964 in Prague, Czechoslovakia.

== Career ==
Henzel is best known for his role as "Sudden" in the teen film G – som i gemenskap (1983). Besides his film roles he has appeared in several commercials for chips and sunglasses.

He appeared in season two of the comedy series Solsidan, broadcast on TV4.

== Family ==
He is the older brother of Patrik Henzel of the Swedish synthpop band NASA.

== Filmography ==
- 1979 – Fjortonårslandet
- 1981 – Veckan då Roger dödades
- 1982 – Avgörandet
- 1983 – G - Som i gemenskap
- 1984 – Splittring
- 1987 – Mr Big
- 1988 – Ingen kan älska som vi
- 1989 – The Resurrection of Michael Myers Part 2
- 2001 – Brudlopp
- 2004 – Spung
- 2005 – Supersnällasilversara och Stålhenrik
- 2005 – Kommissionen
- 2005 – Kvalster
- 2006 – Lilla Jönssonligan & stjärnkuppen
- 2007 – Playa del Sol
- 2011 – Solsidan
- 2012 – Dance Music Now
- 2013 – Allt faller
