= Kapelwa Sikota =

Zambian nurse (1928–2006)

Kapelwa Sikota (1928–2006) was the first Zambian registered nurse, in the 1950s when her country was still the British protectorate of Northern Rhodesia. She trained and qualified in South Africa where nursing education was available before it was developed in Zambia. Her qualifications were not fully recognised at home until independence in 1964 when she was appointed to senior nursing posts. By 1970 she was Chief Nursing Officer in the Ministry of Health. In 2011 she was honoured posthumously by the Zambian Association of University Women.

== Personal life ==
Kapelwa Mwanang'umbi Sikota was born in Mongu District in Barotseland on 7 July 1928. Her father died when she was young. As a girl she was in hospital in Mongu and realised there was not a single Zambian woman nurse on the staff, not even for maternity work. According to a magazine this inspired her to become a nurse herself. She married Aggrey Mulala Sikota, a politically active "African medical assistant" who later became a government official, in 1953 and they had four children.

== Education ==
She was educated to the highest level that any girl in 1930s and 1940s Zambia could reach: first in primary schools in Western Province and then at Chipembi girls' boarding school about 75 km north of Lusaka. Next her brother arranged for her to go to a mission school near Durban, South Africa for secondary education before enrolling at McCord Hospital to train as a nurse. This hospital for black people was widely known as McCord Zulu Hospital and Sikota had to learn Zulu while she was there. When she qualified in 1951 she won "Best Nurse of the Year" award and then did an extra year's training in midwifery. She was the "first Zambian African to qualify as a State registered nurse and a State certified midwife".

== Career ==
Back in Zambia in 1952, she worked at Lusaka Central Hospital, now University Teaching Hospital, and was the first African registered nurse to do so. It was not unusual in Rhodesia and other parts of colonial Africa to find health workers called assistants, orderlies, auxiliaries etc. working under European trained nurses and/or doctors.

For a short spell in the 1950s Sikota was employed at Roan Antelope Mine Hospital in Luanshya. Her work as supervisor in a mining company hostel for trainee nurses gave rise to a UK parliamentary question in 1960 when Iain Macleod, Secretary of State for the Colonies, was asked whether he would deal with discrimination she was experiencing from Rhodesian mining companies. John Stonehouse, the MP asking one of a series of questions relating to the political situation in Northern Rhodesia, said the companies would not employ her in the capacity of a fully qualified, registered nurse. Macleod replied that he had no reason to think Sikota was being "debarred from any post through discrimination". According to her son, the politician and lawyer Sakwiba Sikota, she was involved in "the political and independence struggle", and she and her husband hosted political meetings at home.

On 1 November 1964, one week after Rhodesia became the Republic of Zambia, she was promoted to Sister-in-Charge at University Teaching Hospital (UTH), the first African in that role. Meanwhile, the government encouraged programmes to create enrolled nurses with two years of training, as a step in the direction of fully registered nurses. In 1971 Sikota, by that time Chief Nursing Officer, presented graduation certificates to some of these enrolled nurses.

Sikota held various senior posts in nursing and midwifery. In 1966 she was assistant Matron-in-Chief at the Ministry of Health, and then in 1968 became the first African to hold the post of Zambian Chief Nursing Officer. Her achievements include her part in drafting the 1970 Nursing Act which established the General Nursing Council of Zambia, and a role in developing modern facilities at UTH. From 1971 to 1973 Sikota was President of the Zambia Nurses Association, representing them at International Council of Nurses meetings.

In 1974 she went to France with her husband who had a diplomatic posting there. On her return she was involved in a project exploring the use of customary Zambian healthcare, traditional birth attendants for example, to supplement modern medicine. She retired in 1984. She died on 30 May 2006 and in 2011 she was one of eleven women pioneers in different fields honoured by the Zambian Association of University Women (ZAUW).
