= Idler disaster =

1900 yacht sinking off Cleveland, Ohio

Sinking of the Idler
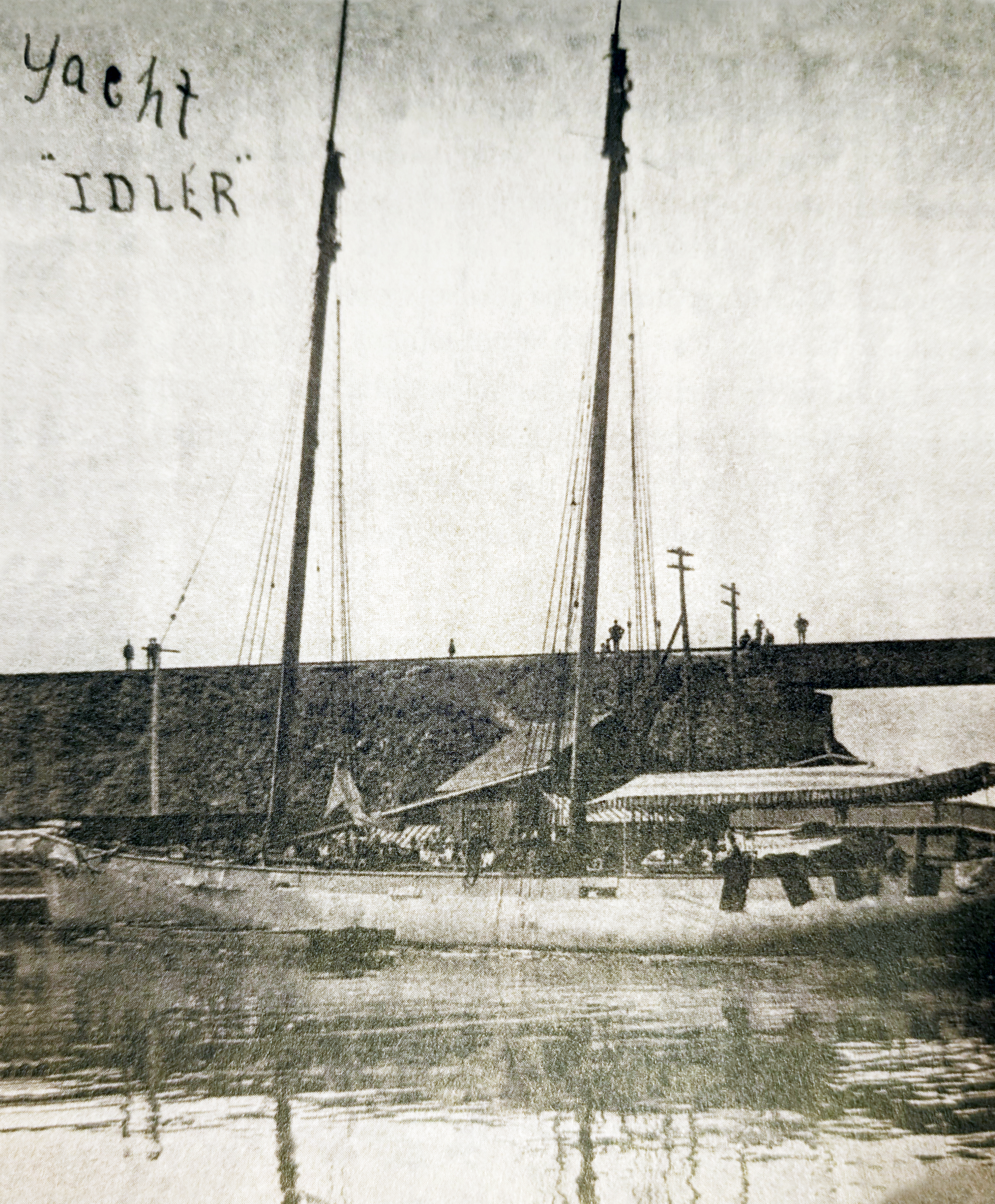
- The Idler undergoing refit in 1900
- Date: July 7, 1900; 126 years ago
- Time: 14:00–14:15 EST
- Duration: 15 minutes
- Location: Lake Erie, 16 miles (26 km) northwest of Cleveland, Ohio; 41°39′3.3984″N 81°57′3.3228″W
- Type: Maritime disaster
- Cause: Storm, negligence
- Deaths: 6

The Idler disaster refers to the sinking on Lake Erie of the luxury racing yacht Idler on July 7, 1900, during a storm. The ocean-going luxury racing yacht had once been an America's Cup competitor. Purchased by James Corrigan in 1899, she was completely refurbished.

Corrigan, his brother, and their families took the yacht on a pleasure cruise across Lake Erie and Lake St. Clair beginning June 30, 1900. All three male passengers and one female passenger disembarked at Port Huron, Michigan, as the vessel returned to Cleveland, Ohio. While northwest of Cleveland, the captain spotted a storm coming from the northwest. Little was done to prepare the ship for the squall. Struck by severe wind, the Idler went onto her starboard beam end (side) twice. Open skylights in the deck allowed water to pour in, and she sank within a few minutes. Six of the seven passengers drowned, all of them women. James Corrigan lost his wife, three daughters, a granddaughter, and a niece. The sinking captured headlines in nearly all regional newspapers in the American Midwest.

An initial search of the wreck recovered three bodies. The remains of an infant were recovered from the ship after it was towed into the harbor at Cleveland and refloated. The remaining two bodies were found over the next two months.

James Corrigan blamed Captain Charles J. Holmes for failing to take in sail prior to the storm. Local vesselmen disputed the captain and mate's claim that the storm was severe, and believed Holmes to have been negligent.

A Cuyahoga County coroner's inquest was hindered by the departure of most of the crew for their home in Norway. The coroner held "accidental death" in one of the six deaths, and did not issue a ruling in the other five. A federal grand jury indicted Holmes on charges of manslaughter, but the case was nolled after none of the witnesses could be induced to return to Cuyahoga County.

The Idler was refloated and given to a new owner. She sank again in 1904 after ice swept her into Lake Erie, and she was dismantled.

== About the Idler ==
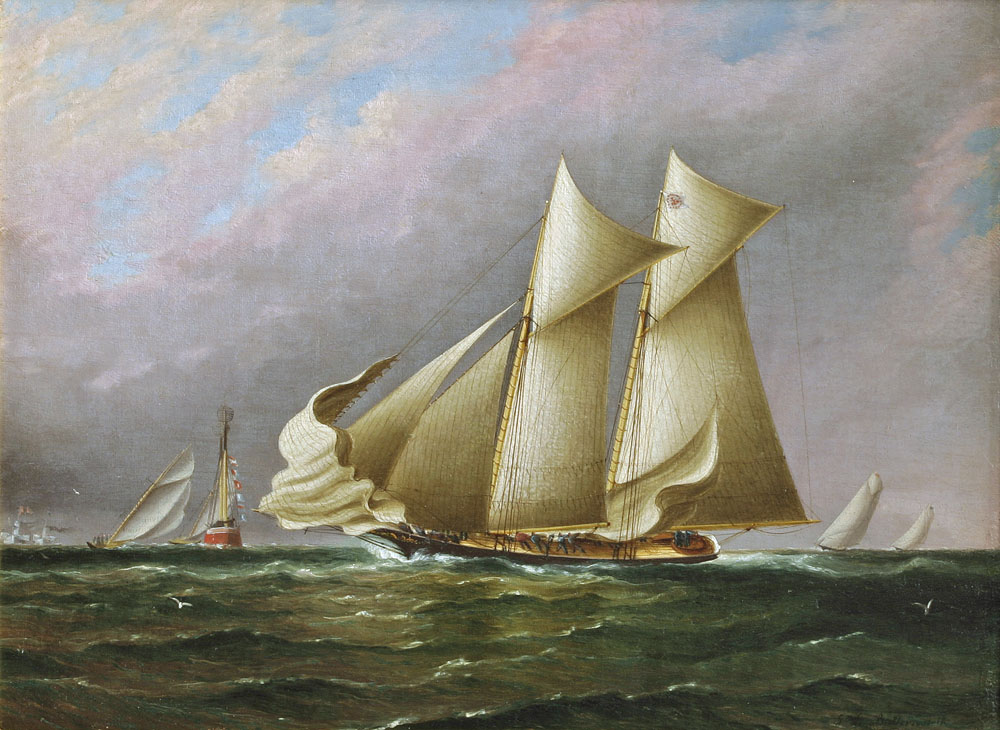
1870 painting depicting the Idler during a New York Yacht Club regatta.

James Corrigan was the multi-millionaire owner of a Cleveland-based shipping fleet, numerous iron mines in the Midwest, and an iron ore-dealing firm. He was also a lifelong avid yachtsman.

On October 5, 1899, Corrigan purchased the luxury schooner yacht Idler for about $12,000 ($464,400 in 2025 dollars). Built in New Haven, Connecticut, in 1864 by shipbuilder F. Colgate, Idler was an ocean-going racing vessel. She was 97 feet (30 m) long, had a 23-foot (7.0 m) beam, drew 9.7 feet (3.0 m), and displaced 84 short tons (76 t).

Idler had been lengthened to 106 feet (32 m) in 1873, (Note: Apart from the lengthening, her dimensions and tonnage did not appreciably change.) and had her keel reworked in 1877. (Note: Originally a centreboard yacht, this was removed.) She'd undergone a wide range of repairs and a number of overhauls between 1882 and 1899, and been almost completely rebuilt in 1890 and 1892. (Note: Her dimensions and tonnage did not change in either rebuilding.)

When Corrigan purchased her, however, she was rotting and decrepit. Corrigan spent $8,000 ($309,600 in 2025 dollars) rebuilding and refurbishing the yacht. He had all but her hull replaced and the ship painted white. Her new interior accommodations were extremely comfortable. The Idler was widely considered one of the safest yachts on the Great Lakes, and both Mate Samuel Biggam and A.R. Landreth of the Cleveland Yacht Club claimed the yacht "absolutely safe and seaworthy."

On June 8, 1900, James Corrigan took the Idler out on Lake Erie for handling trials prior to her "maiden" voyage. A thunderstorm with heavy rain hit the ship, and she almost went over on her beam ends. The storm came on suddenly, and Corrigan himself helped lower the mainsail. The rope slid through his fingers, injuring him.

== Captain Charles J. Holmes and crew ==
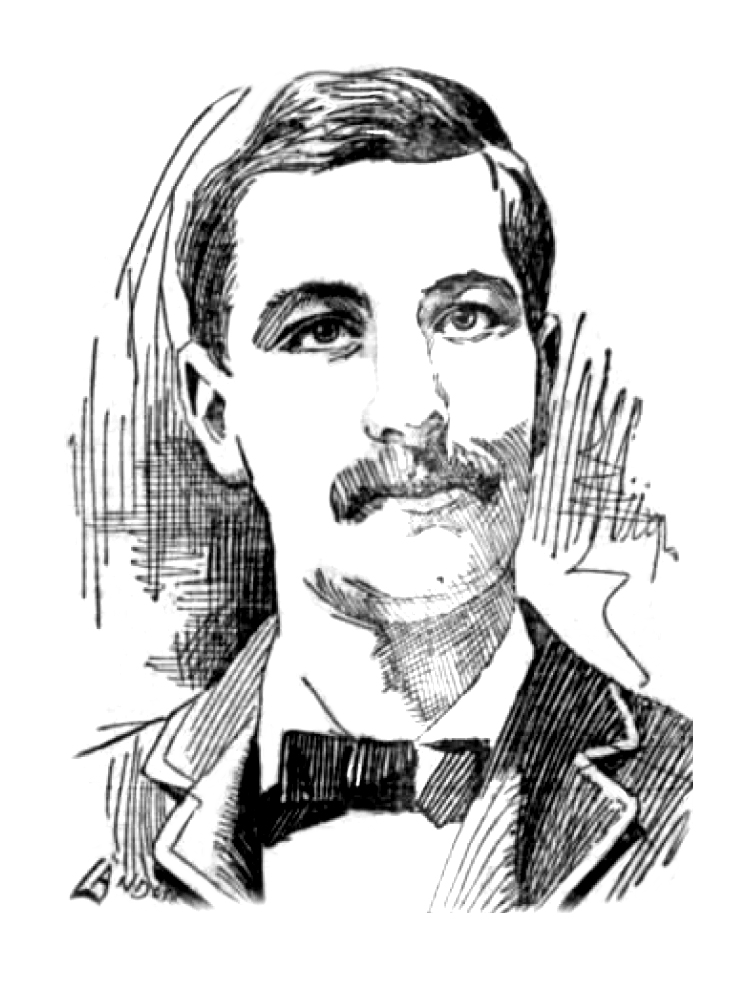
Charles J. Holmes

To captain the Idler, Corrigan hired 27-year-old Charles Joseph Holmes on October 18, 1899. He was a married man, and his wife and two children lived in Port Huron, Michigan. Holmes had spent his entire life sailing both lakes and oceans in large and small craft, nine of those years on the Great Lakes. He was reckless, a self-promoter, thrill-seeker, and liar. He falsely claimed to have captained the half-clipper ship Glory of the Seas in his early 20s, and set a record sailing from New York City to Shanghai in just 72 days. (Note: Holmes lied. The fastest run ever recorded was 85 days, and Glory of the Seas does not appear on reliable lists of ships making fast runs to Shanghai or any port in China.) Holmes also claimed to have smuggled arms to Cuba in January 1897, and in June 1897 announced he would sail around the world in a 20-foot (6.1 m) sailboat.

His record as a Great Lakes ship captain was mixed. On November 13, 1896, Holmes attempted to bring the MV Walulla into the harbor at Conneaut, Ohio, during a severe storm without the aid of tugboats. He missed the pier and crashed on the shore. The ship burst into flames and two crewmembers died.

James Corrigan later told the press that he hired Holmes because he had experience on oceans as well as lakes, had good recommendations, and was considered an expert seaman. Author John Stark Bellamy suggests that Corrigan also chose Holmes because the young man was a flashy risk-taker.

The crew was hired by Holmes in May, and included first mate Samuel Biggam and sailors Jacob Antonson, Charles Johnson, Olaf Neilson, and Severn Neilson. (Note: Severn Neilson was also referred to in the press as Silcein Neilsen and Aleck Neilsen. Olaf Neilson was also referred to as Ole Neilson. Bellamy includes Charles Kelley among the sailors, but no sources in 1900 mention him.) Biggam had 36 years of experience on everything from small coastal fishing boats to the huge oceanic steamer SS Great Eastern. Nineteen of those years had been spent on the Great Lakes, where he was mostly employed on schooners. Three of the four sailors were Norwegian, and all were very experienced. (Note: Olaf Neilson had been a sailor for 10 years, although this was his first season on Great Lakes. Jacob Antonson had been a sailor for 15 years, two of them on the Great Lakes. Severn Nielson had sailed for ten years, and this was his first season on Great Lakes. Jacob Antonson had been a sailor for 15 years, two of them on Great Lakes. Charles Johnson was the least experienced, being only 20 years old.)

Cleveland area yachtsman said later that they felt Holmes had not properly captained the Idler during her brief outings on Lake Erie after her refit. Part of the problem, captains of other sailing ships said, was that a vessel the size of the Idler should have had eight or nine sailors.

== Maiden voyage under Corrigan ==
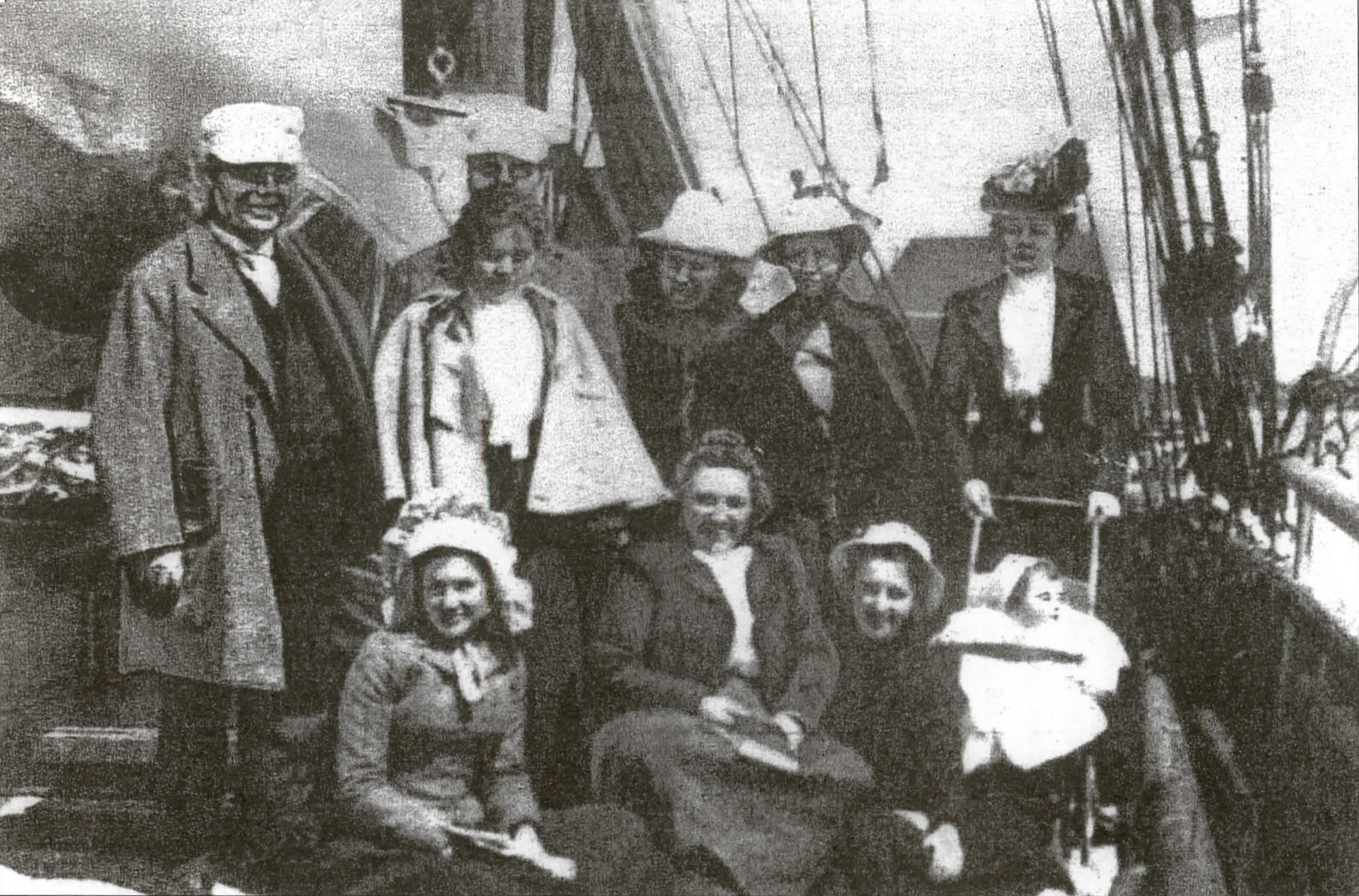
James Corrigan, his brother, and their families on the Idler prior to departure on June 30, 1900

About June 30, the Idler left Cleveland for Lake St. Clair. Aboard were James Corrigan; his 46-year-old wife, Ida Belle; his 22-year-old daughter Jane; and his 15-year-old daughter Ida May. Traveling with them was James's eldest married daughter, 24-year-old Nettie Corrigan Rieley and her one-year-old daughter, Mary. The other family traveling on the Idler was that of John Corrigan, and included his 51-year-old wife, Mary; 18-year-old daughter Etta Irene; and 22-year old married daughter Viola Gilbert.

In addition to the captain, mate, and sailors, the crew consisted of first cook/steward George Welch, second cook/steward Charles Hackett, and carpenter William Summers.

The Idler passed Detroit, Michigan, on her way into Lake St. Clair on July 1, and returned to Lake Erie under sail on July 2. She went back to Lake St. Clair at some point, and by July 6 was at Port Huron, Michigan.

While at Port Huron on July 6, James Corrigan, suffering from a severe ear infection, left the Idler and took a train home to Cleveland to see his doctor. (Note: He had been suffering from the infection since late June.) Viola Gilbert accompanied him so that she might attend a friend's bridal shower in Cleveland. John Corrigan also left the Idler to take a train to Buffalo, New York, where he had a business meeting. Before he departed, James Corrigan told Capt. Holmes to let the steamer J. Emery Owen tow the Idler back to Cleveland.

The Idler left Port Huron at about 5 PM on July 6, towed by the schooner Australia, which was in turn towed by the steamship J. Emery Owen. On July 7 at 12:30 AM, she passed the city of Detroit on her way to Lake Erie, (Note: Holmes mistakenly said the yacht passed Detroit at 5 AM.) still towed by the J. Emery Owen. As the tow line occasionally went slack and tightened again, the Idler jerked violently and the women became seasick. Ida Belle Corrigan asked Capt. Holmes to cast off the tow line, and after some discussion he did so at 6:30 AM when the Idler was off Bar Point, Ontario. (Note: Bar Point is about 3.25 miles (5.23 km) south of Amherstburg, Ontario.)

== Sinking of the Idler ==
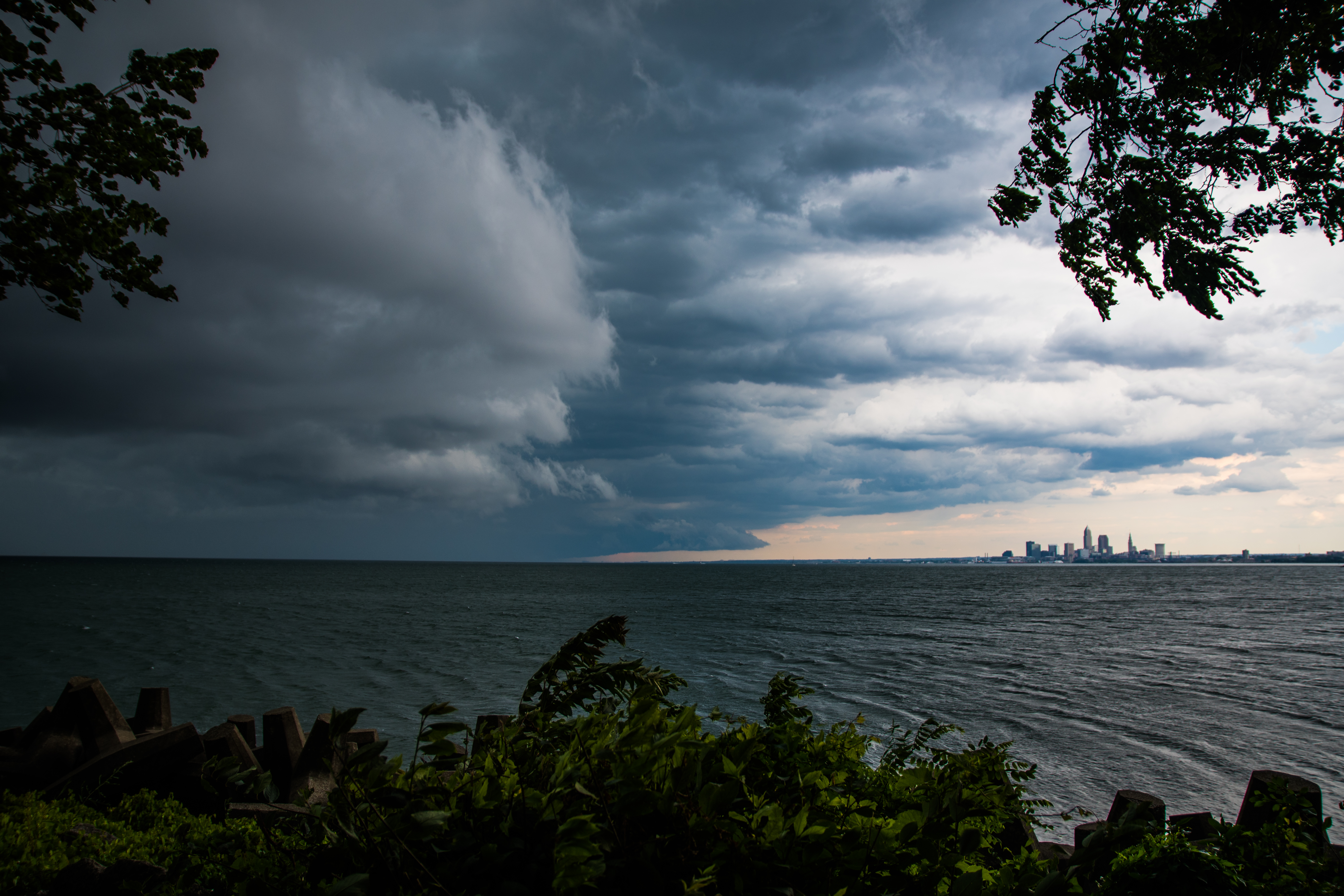
A thunderstorm over Lake Erie near Cleveland, Ohio, in 2018

=== The approach of the squall ===
Off Bar Point, the wind was coming from the southwest. After breakfast, Holmes had the spinnaker and balloon staysail set. The wind changed about 11 AM to come from the west-southwest, and was light.

At roughly 10:30 AM, (Note: Colchester Beach is 12 miles (19 km) or so southeast of Bar Point. If the Idler was doing 2.6 knots, it would have been off Colchester Beach at roughly 10:30 AM.) the yacht Ada W. passed the Idler off Colchester Beach, Ontario. A passenger aboard the Ada W. said he could already see the squall coming, and the wind was stiff.

The spinnaker was taken down at 11:30 AM, and the jib topsail set.

The captain and crew of the Idler saw a squall approaching from the northwest at about 12 noon. (Note: Just when the weather turned from "threatening" to "approaching squall" is somewhat in dispute. Olaf Neilson the weather had looked threatening all day. William Summers said it was fine until 10:30 AM, but afterward was only fair. Severn Neilson said the sky in the northwest was dark before lunch. Charles Johnson said the sky was dark at about 12:30 PM, but Samuel Biggam said he actually spotted the squall at that time.) The balloon staysail was taken down in the expectation that the wind would shift. Neither Holmes nor Biggam thought the squall looked particularly severe. The Idler had passed through storms every day during the trip, and this one looked to be no different to them. (Note: Holmes claimed at least one of these squalls had winds of 40 miles per hour (64 km/h), and the yacht had been completely stable in that squall.) It might, Biggam told Holmes, have winds of 30 to 35 miles per hour (48 to 56 km/h). Holmes felt that there would be heavy rain, at most: "No sailor would take down all his canvas every time he saw a black cloud. I saw the cloud, but thought there was nothing but rain in it." (Note: Olaf Neilson said the crew felt the storm was going to be bad. They were constantly on edge, waiting for Holmes to order the sails lowered. Severn Neilson thought the storm looked dark and angry from the start. The least experienced sailor, Charles Johnson, believed the storm was not going to be very strong.)

At 1:05 PM, after a noon lunch, the mainsail, foresail, forestaysail, main topmast staysail, standard jib, flying jibs, jib topsails, fore-gaff topsails, and main-gaff topsails went up. Winds were now about 8.6 to 10.5 knots (15.9 to 19.4 km/h; 9.9 to 12.1 mph), coming from the northwest. The Idler was roughly 22 miles (35 km) northwest of Cleveland. (Note: There was a 10-knot (19 km/h; 12 mph) to 12-knot (22 km/h; 14 mph) wind. The wind was almost calm by 1:30 PM, and the ship barely moving. The disaster occurred at just after 2 PM, when the ship was 16 miles (26 km) northeast of Cleveland. Given these parameters, the Idler would have been about 22 miles (35 km) away at 1 PM.) Cook/steward Charles Hackett said that although it was obvious by this time that the squall was going to hit the Idler, cousins Etta and Jane Corrigan came on deck to sit in chairs at the stern.

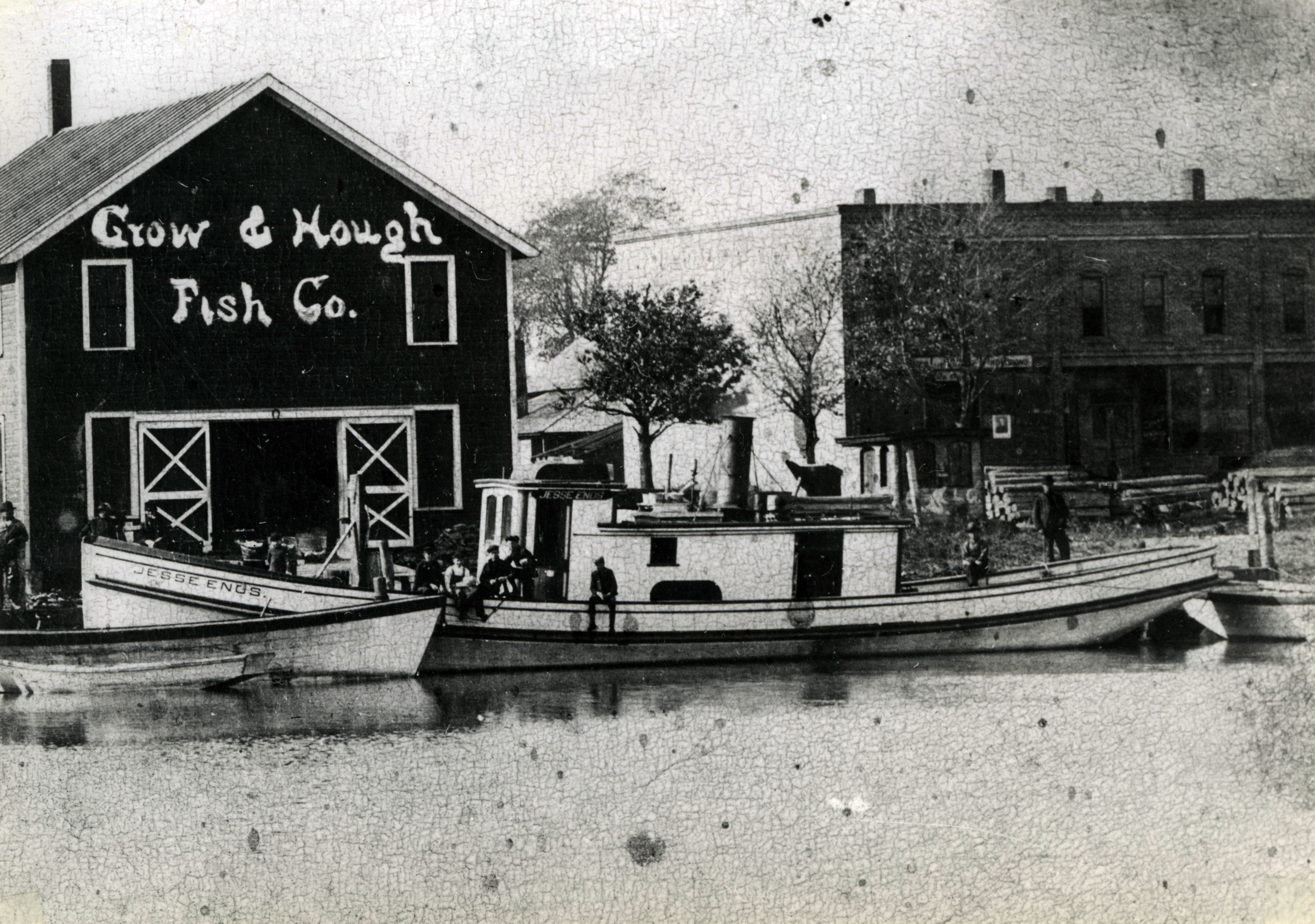
The fishing tug Jesse Enos of Ashtabula, Ohio. The F.E. Smith, Effie B., and Helene were very similar vessels.

Capt. Holmes ordered the lead cook/steward, George Welch, to ensure that all the deadlights were closed. (Note: Holmes told the coroner's inquest that he also ordered the main topsail taken down at 1 PM. His testimony did not mention raising it.) Welch told second cook/steward Charles Hackett to carry out the order.

The deadlights were skylight openings in the deck located along the sides of the yacht, two on the port side and two on the starboard side. They dropped downward when opened, and were fastened to the interior ceiling. Opening a deadlight dislodged a brass grating over the opening, which was supposed to be put in a box on deck. Closing a deadlight required going below, unfastening the deadlight, and locking it closed.

Hackett found the two deadlights on the port side and one on the starboard side open. He was able to secure all of them except the deadlight over the bathroom, which was locked and occupied at the time. (Note: Reports are unclear if the bathroom was on the port or starboard side.)

It began to rain shortly after 1 PM, and Holmes said he asked Biggam what he thought about the storm's strength. Biggam replied, "It's all over now." Holmes said he knew the storm was not over, because he looked to the northwest and could see wind on the water. The captain and crew still had plenty of time to prepare the Idler for the approaching storm. Experienced Cleveland yachtsmen believed that Holmes would have had ample time to prepare for the storm even if he'd had only 30 minutes, and Biggam believed the crew could have furled almost all sails in just 15 minutes. (Note: After being rescued on July 7, Captain Holmes claimed the storm came on suddenly, just 20 minutes after it was first spotted, and there was no time to take in sails. The next day, he revised his story and said he made "the usual preparations" for a storm and kept the mainsail up to prevent a capsize.)

By 1:30 PM, winds were light and seemed to come from many directions ("baffling"). Biggam began keeping an eye on the storm constantly, as it appeared to be gaining strength.

About 1:45 PM, the weather was almost calm, with light wind coming from the southwest. The sky was very threatening, however, and it was growing darker. Biggam asked Captain Holmes if they should take the "light" sails down. (Note: The term "light sails" is unclear, but Biggam denied he mentioned taking down the foresail.) (Biggam later said that he would have taken in all sails at this point, except for the fore staysail.) With Mary Corrigan standing nearby, Holmes replied, "Keep it on and have a little excitement." (Note: Holmes denied ever saying such a thing. Holmes later told the press and the coroner that Biggam never asked to take any sail down.)

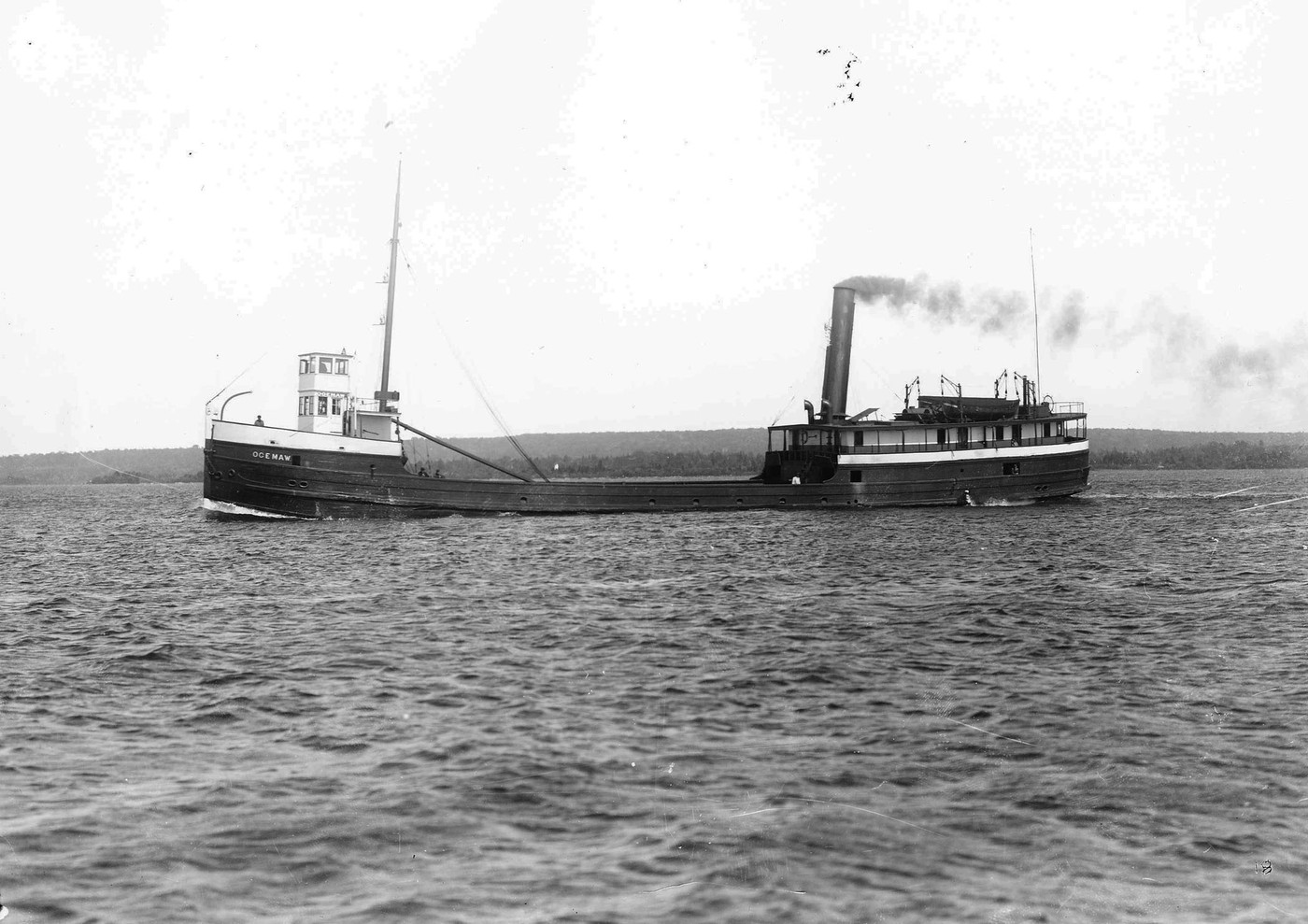
The steamer Ogemaw passed the Idler about 15 minutes before the storm hit, and its captain was surprised that Idler still had all its sails up.

The fishing tug Helene passed the Idler about this time, heading east. The steamer Ogemaw was abreast of the Idler and somewhat to north, also heading east. The captain of the Helene thought the storm looked "wicked", and shouted at the Idler to take her sails in. Capt. Martin O'Toole of the Ogemaw was surprised to see that the Idler was not taking its sails down.

Holmes then curtly ordered the crew to take down the main topmast staysail and both gaff sails. As the crew took in the topmast staysail, Holmes told Biggam to ensure that all the deadlights were closed. Biggam ordered the stewards to do so. Either one of the stewards or carpenter William Summers found two deadlights open on the starboard side. (Note: Biggam testified that it was one of the stewards who found the two deadlights open, although he did not say which steward did so.) Mary Corrigan told him that the women had opened them to allow cool air into the stifling hot staterooms. The crewmember told Holmes, who ordered them closed. Either Biggam, a steward, or Summers went below and closed them. (Note: Capt. Holmes later claimed that he, personally, had closed all the ship's deadlights.) As the crew finished taking in the gaff sails, they were sent below to put on their oilskins and sea boots.

About 1:50 or 1:55 PM, (Note: Carpenter William Summers put the time at about 1:40 PM.) heavy thunder and lightning began. It became quite dark, and the lake was choppy with large waves. The captain went below to change into his foul-weather gear. When he came back on deck two minutes later, Biggam asked Holmes if the crew could take down all but the fore staysail. (Note: Biggam told a federal investigator that he had hesitated to make any such suggestion earlier because Holmes was "a man who does not allow any dictation", and that "[The captain] was on deck where he could see the clouds and weather. The captain issued his own orders." Holmes told the coroner's inquest, "I allowed no dictation from any of the crew of officers under me.")

The fishing tugs Effie B. and F.E. Smith were about 2 to 3 miles (3.2 to 4.8 km) behind the Idler. The captains of both boats were all surprised that Idler was not taking down her sails. Fishermen and sailors standing on Eagle Cliff in Bay Village, Ohio, saw the Idler "staggering" under full sail just before the storm struck. "Those fellows will have their hands full if they don't shorten sail right away," one sailor said at the time. (Note: The wreck occurred about 10 miles (16 km) north-northeast of Eagle Cliff. Afterward, the fishermen and sailors could see the yacht's masts still above water.)

The sky was now black with clouds in the northeast as well. The wind started coming from the southeast, so the Idler began tacking to starboard. (Note: "Tacking to starboard" means the yacht's starboard side was facing the wind. Holmes later said Idler was "running before the wind", which indicates he thought the wind came from the northwest and the Idler was not tacking.)

Just a minute or two before 2 PM, Capt. Holmes ordered the crew to furl the main topsail, fore topsail, and fore jib topsail. (Note: In his coroner's inquest testimony, Holmes said he only ordered the jib topsail and flying jib taken down.) The wind had suddenly become quite strong, however. The yacht was lying over (tilted) strongly to starboard, and the crew could not take in the forestaysail. The crew had lowered and clewed the main gaff topsail and was taking down the fore jib topsail when the storm struck. (Note: Charles Johnson placed the furling of the main gaff topsail earlier, 15 minutes before the storm struck. His estimate was based on his belief that the crew had covered up the spinnaker and staysail to protect them from rain. Capt. Holmes, however, said covering of the sails occurred much earlier, between 1:05 and 1:15 PM.)

The Idler was at that moment 16 miles (26 km) northwest of Cleveland.

=== The squall hits ===
The squall hit just after 2 PM, with winds of 52 knots (96 km/h; 60 mph) and blinding sheets of rain. Although the storm had been approaching from the northwest and the crew expected strong winds from the northwest, the storm winds actually came from the northeast. The Idler was tacking to port when the storm hit. She jibbed over (the jib moved from one side of the ship to the other), and her foreboom swung far off center. Her main boom swung about halfway off center, and there it stuck, as its guy became tangled.

The wind then suddenly shifted to come from the north-northwest. Capt. Holmes was standing next to the wheel, which was being held by sailor Jake Antonson. Holmes took the wheel and sent Antonson forward to help take down canvas. Holmes ordered the crew to let go the flying jib. (Note: Holmes's coroner's inquest testimony is slightly unclear, but indicates that he gave orders to take down the flying jib before the squall hit. He also claimed that he ordered the foresail taken down when the storm hit.) The crew let go of all the halyards and began to take down sails without orders from Holmes. (Note: Severn Neilson also said he heard no orders from the captain.) According to carpenter William Summers, none of the crew panicked.

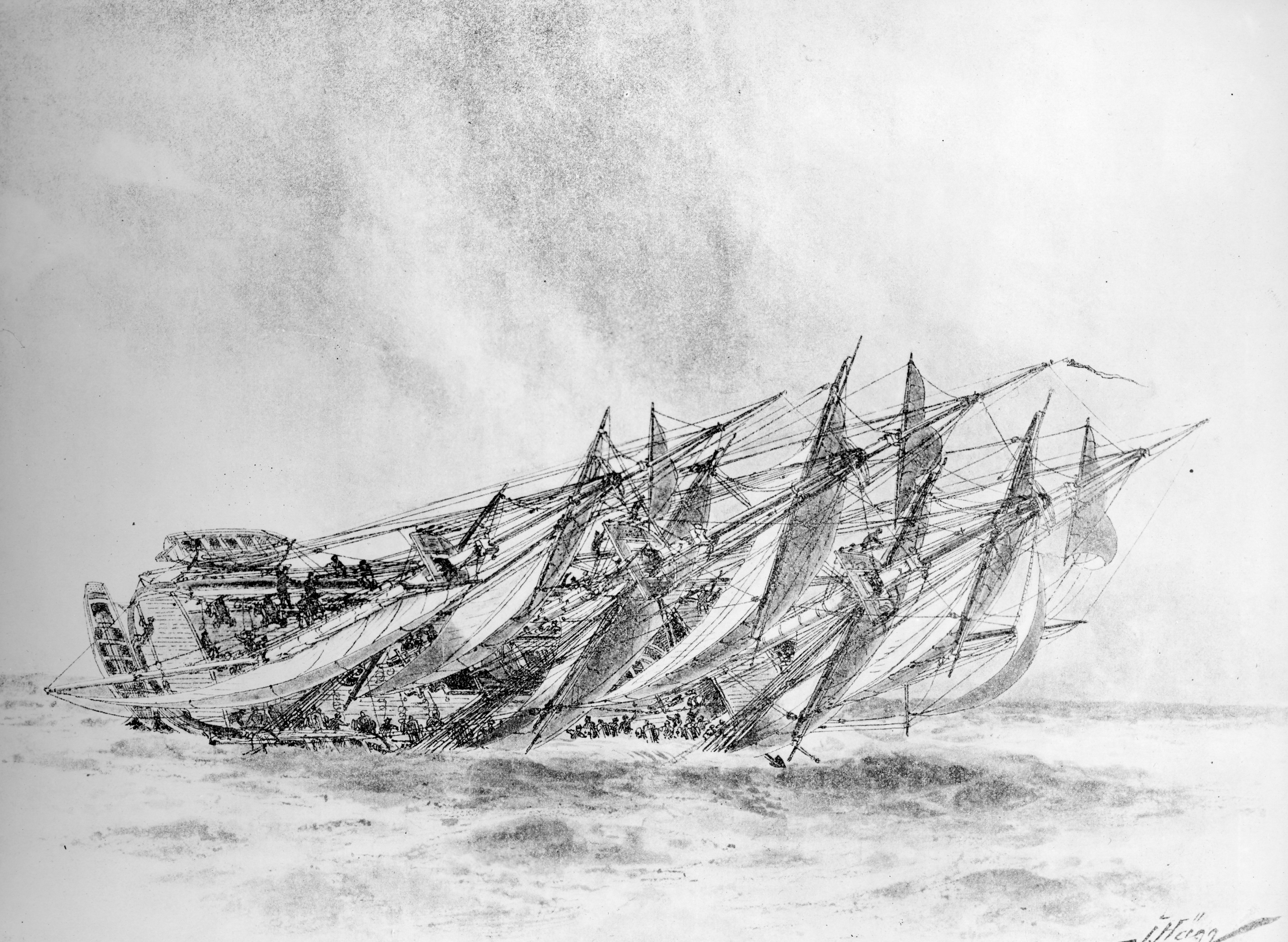
In this drawing, the 113-foot (34 m) corvette Carlskrona sinks while on her starboard beam end in April 1846. The 97-foot (30 m) Idler sank in the same way.

Two or three minutes after the storm hit, (Note: According to Jacob Antonson and Severn Neilson, the Idler jibbed over for a minute or two. A minute later, she went on her beam end.) an extremely powerful gust hit the yacht from either the port quarter or just abaft the port beam. According to Jacob Antonson, now back at the wheel, Holmes ordered him to "put the wheel down" (turn it as far as it could go) to turn the yacht's bow into the wind. (Note: Louis Reif, a sailor aboard the tug F.E. Smith, thought the Idler was trying to turn her nose into the wind, but there was too much sail up. Morris A. Bradley, the shipping fleet owner, disagreed: "From the position in which the yacht now stands, it would appear that as soon as the squall struck the boat the helm was abandoned. It does not seem credible that the yacht's nose was put in the wind." Holmes said the Idler may have veered, and did not mention any orders to put the wheel down.) The Idler immediately heeled over onto its starboard side. (Note: Holmes denied that it went on its beam ends, saying the deck was only at a 70 degree angle.) The crew cut loose all the remaining halyards they could reach, but the yacht had heeled over too far (Note: Olaf Neilson said the rail was already under water.) and they could only loosen the foresail. (Note: Olaf Neilson believed "a jib" was also down.) Then the foregaff broke.

In the ship's galley, second cook/steward Charles Hackett believed the boat was sinking. He opened a skylight and climbed out onto the deck. First cook/steward George Welch also managed to come out on deck. Welch shouted at Holmes, "Shall I get the live-preservers?" According to Hackett, Holmes held up his hand to stop him, and said "No! No! I have been in a hundred like this." (Note: Biggam confirmed that at no point prior to the storm hitting did Holmes issue an order to don life preservers. Charles Johnson said none of the women on deck were wearing life preservers.) Holmes later told the press that many yachts sailed with the lee rail near the water, and this seemed no different.

Ida May Corrigan was on deck amidships. Severn Neilson grabbed her to prevent her from falling over the starboard side, then let her go and rushed forward to cut loose any remaining halyards.

The Idler righted herself. The captain shouted for the crew to let go of all head sails. (Note: Holmes told the coroner's jury that he "gave orders to let the rest of it go after I realized that no ordinary squall had struck us." Charles Johnson said he only heard the captain specifically order let go the jib and staysails.)

The passengers below deck (Note: According to Mary Corrigan, these were herself, Ida Belle Corrigan, Ida May Corrigan, Nettie Corrigan, and Nettie's infant daughter, as Etta and Jane were on deck. This indicates that Ida May went below after Severn Neilson released her.) (Note: The Idler had a large lounge amidships, and four private staterooms aft. There were several storerooms and closets, and more than one toilet. Forward of the lounge was a galley, pantry, and large icebox. The crew berths were beneath the forecastle) were screaming for help. Holmes left the wheel, shouting at sailor Jake Antonson to steer her. Holmes went into the companionway and shouted something, but according to Mary Corrigan he could not be understood. (Note: Initial press reports and Holmes' early statements were that Holmes made it down into the cabin, where he found the terrified women clinging to whatever they could. Holmes told them the yacht was sinking, to put on life preservers, and get on deck, but they refused to move. According to Mary Corrigan, however, Mate Samuel Biggam was the only one she saw come into the cabin, and the only one who tried to help the women.) Holmes later said that he only got three steps down the "flooded" companionway before he heard someone shout "She is sinking!" He immediately returned to the wheel. (Note: At no point, Mate Biggam said, was any notice or warning given to the passengers. Holmes, however, said he ordered Ida May and Jane Corrigan below once he realized rain was imminent.)

Back on deck, Holmes said he saw Samuel Biggam standing by the weather rail, waving his coat for a fishing tug to come save them. He also said he saw Jane Corrigan clinging to the port railing, begging to be saved. (Note: Charles Johnson said this was Ida May Corrigan. He seems to be mistaken, as Mary Corrigan said Ida May was below decks with her, and both Biggam and Holmes said it was Jane Corrigan at the port railing.)

Two or three minutes after the first gust hit, another powerful blast of wind from the northeast pushed the Idler over onto her starboard side. Her mainsail went into in water, the soaking wet canvas acting like an anchor and keeping her on her beam end. Most of the crew was thrown into the water.

Water began pouring into the ship through the open companionway, skylight, and two deadlights. Biggam heard Antonson shout that two deadlights were open. (Note: Biggam later said that going on beam end during such a severe storm was, itself, not very alarming. It was only when he realized the companionway and deadlights were open that he became afraid.) He and cook/steward Charles Hackett made their way through the open companionway, wading through water that was already neck-deep. Biggam said that at least two deadlights were open, one in the room occupied by the John Corrigans and the other in the aft cabin. Mary Corrigan was in the aft cabin struggling to close the deadlight, but water was pouring in too swiftly. Biggam closed the deadlight, then ordered her on deck. Mary went, begging the other women to come with her. The two men proceeded further aft to James Corrigan's room, where they found Ida Belle Corrigan, Mary's daughter Etta, Ida May, and Nettie Riley (her infant in her arms). (Note: Biggam told the press only that he saw "one of the young ladies" below deck. According to Mary Corrigan, this was Ida May. Charles Johnson said that Etta Corrigan had been on deck when the Idler went on her beam end the first time, and that she probably ran below after it righted.) Biggam told them the yacht was sinking and tried to get them on deck, but Ida Belle and Nettie would not come out. Biggam begged Nettie to let him have the baby, but she refused. "When I go, the baby goes," she told Biggam. Ida Belle refused to leave her daughter Mary. The best the two men could do was to get life preservers on the three.

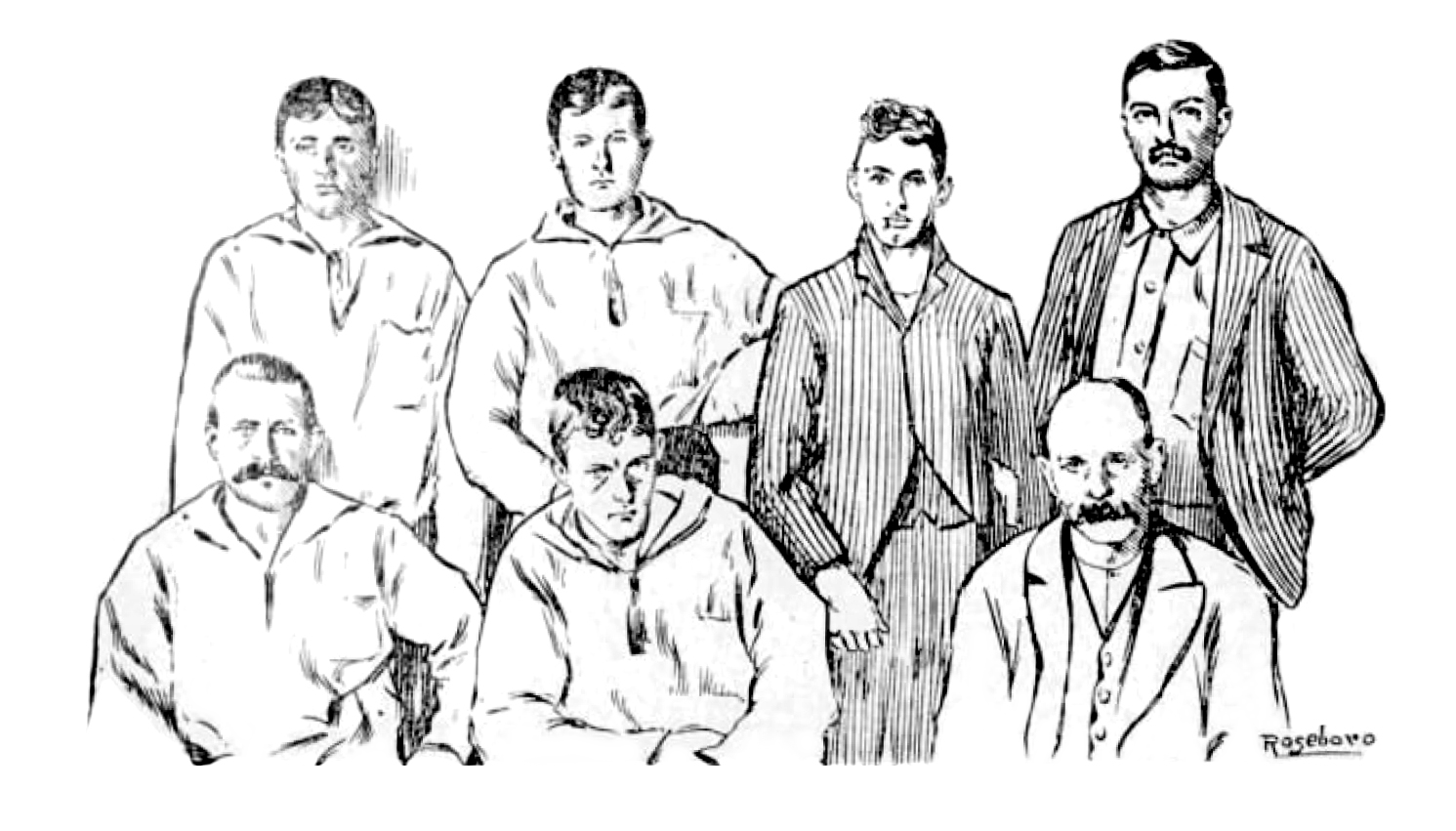
The crew of the Idler. Standing (L to R): Norwegian sailor, Norwegian sailor, Samuel Biggam, Charles J. Holmes. Sitting (L to R): Norwegian sailor, Norwegian sailor, unidentified.

Biggam and the steward went back up on deck. Biggam said that Ida May followed them on deck at first, but then returned to the cabin, calling for her mother. Biggam saw Capt. Holmes and Olaf Neilson (Note: Olaf Neilson told the coroner's inquest that he was helping Holmes and Jane.) holding on to Jane Corrigan near the port railing, to keep her out of the water. She was begging the crew to save her mother. Biggam and Holmes tried to get Mary and Jane to climb the crosstrees, so that when the yacht righted they would be clear of the water, but waves swept all six overboard.

Ida May, who came on deck, (Note: Testimony last mentioned her going below. But as she was on deck a few moments later and swept overboard, it is obvious she did come on deck.) was at the stern with Severn Neilson, shouting for her mother to come on deck. A wave swept her over the side. She was last seen in the water, clinging to the starboard railing.

Holmes rose to the surface some distance from the yacht and found a fender. Jane Corrigan was nearby, and Holmes grabbed her by the hair to keep her head above water. She could not hold on to the fender in the heavy seas. For a few moments, Jane wrapped her arms around Holmes's neck in an attempt to save herself. She clung to him so tightly, he could not breathe. Heavy waves broke her hold on Holmes, and she was swept away from him. (Note: Holmes told the coroner that he lost consciousness, and did not remember Jane losing her grip.)

Etta and Jane somehow made it partway up the stern. (Note: This makes it clear that Etta, too, came on deck either with Biggam and Hackett, or some time shortly thereafter.) Etta spotted a small sofa made of cork, and tossed it to her mother in the water. Large waves then swept the two girls away. (Note: Etta's body was found inside the yacht's cabin. The press reported that she was last seen near the Idler close to the companionway, and that it is likely she was sucked into the Idler as it sank.) Large waves swamped the cork sofa three times, causing Mary Corrigan to let go of it. Each time, she managed to get back to the sofa and hang on again.

The Idler's gig had broken in two, leaving only the smaller rowboat. The rowboat was tangled in rope, but Charles Johnson cut it loose, even though the yacht was sinking and he was risking his own life. He and Jake Antonson plunged into the water, climbed aboard the rowboat, and spotted Ida May in the water. They tried to reach her, but the rowboat became tangled in another line. They could no longer see her by the time they cut the rope. They spotted Capt. Holmes and Mary Corrigan and managed to get both of them aboard.

=== Sinking ===
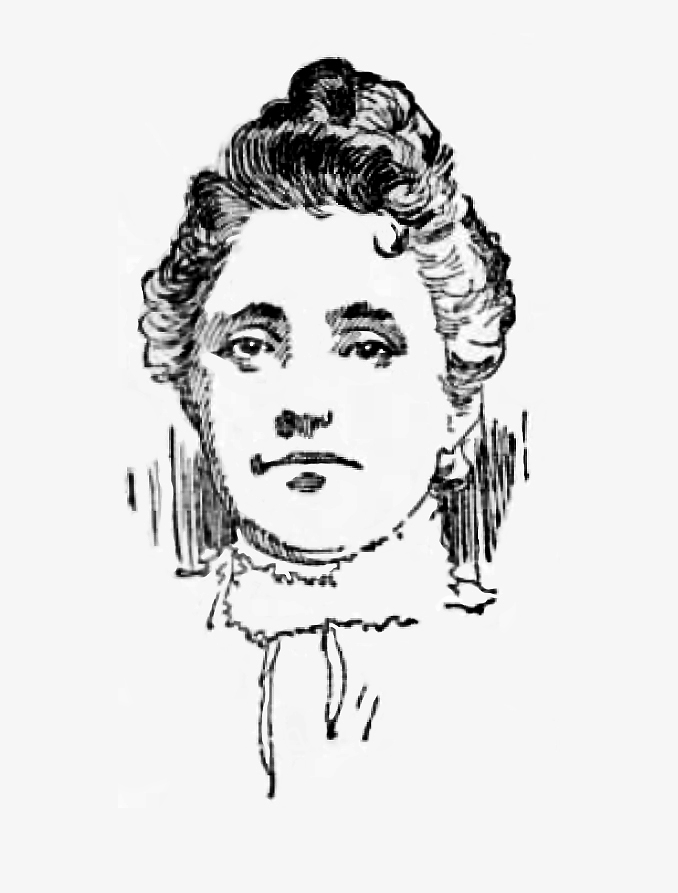
Mary Corrigan, wife of John Corrigan. She was the sole passenger to survive.

The Idler lay on her side for approximately three minutes, (Note: The time estimate varies. Olaf and Severn Neilson estimated the yacht lay on her side for just one minute, while William Summers said it was 10 minutes. Captain Charles Holmes said it sank "immediately" after he came back on deck.) then began to sink stern first. She righted as she went down in 58 feet (18 m) of water. (Note: Initial reports were that she was in only 53 feet (16 m) of water. A rescue tug, however, took an actual sounding and measured the water at 58 feet deep.) The time was 2:10 PM by the ship's clock. (Note: This is confirmed by Biggam, whose watch stopped at 2:12 PM.) From the time she first time went on her beam end until the time she sank took only 10 to 15 minutes.

The yacht hit the lake bottom upright, its bow facing north-northeast. Her crosstrees and topmasts projected about 20 to 25 feet (6.1 to 7.6 m) above the waves. The point where the main boom was attached to the mast was about 2 feet (0.61 m) above the water.

Biggam's feet became entangled in the ship's rigging and he was pulled under the water by the sinking ship. He kicked off his boots and managed to get free. Carpenter William Summers, who could not swim, was drowning nearby. Biggam swam over, held him above water, and got the two of them to the cross-trees. The two cook/stewards had already climbed the cross-trees to safety.

At about 2:15 PM, (Note: Fishing tugs of the day could make about 9 knots (17 km/h; 10 mph) per hour. Both tugs were only three miles away, so they would have reached the Idler about 15 minutes after the storm struck. The F.E. Smith and Effie B. may have been closer, as sailor Charles Johnson said they were within sight, despite the gloom and heavy rain, before the Idler heeled over the first time. Mate Samuel Biggam estimated the tugs arrived five minutes after the yacht sank.) the fishing tugs Effie B. and F.E. Smith arrived. (Note: The Ogemaw lost sight of the Idler when she went down, but its crew assumed the yacht was merely not visible in rain and fog.) The Idler was still on her side, and Charles Johnson was just getting the rowboat free. Wreckage covered the water. Sailor Olaf Neilson saw Ida May floating lifeless in the water, and managed to grab her. A line was thrown from the F.E. Smith to Nielsen. He grabbed it and wrapped it about his arm. Unfortunately, that was the same arm holding on to Ida May. When sailors aboard the F.E. Smith began to pull on the line, Nielson's arm was yanked away from the girl, and Ida May disappeared beneath the water. Mary Corrigan was in the water for 30 minutes before she was saved.

All passengers except Mary Corrigan drowned. The captain, mate, and all crew members survived.

== Recovery of the dead ==
=== Immediate recovery efforts ===
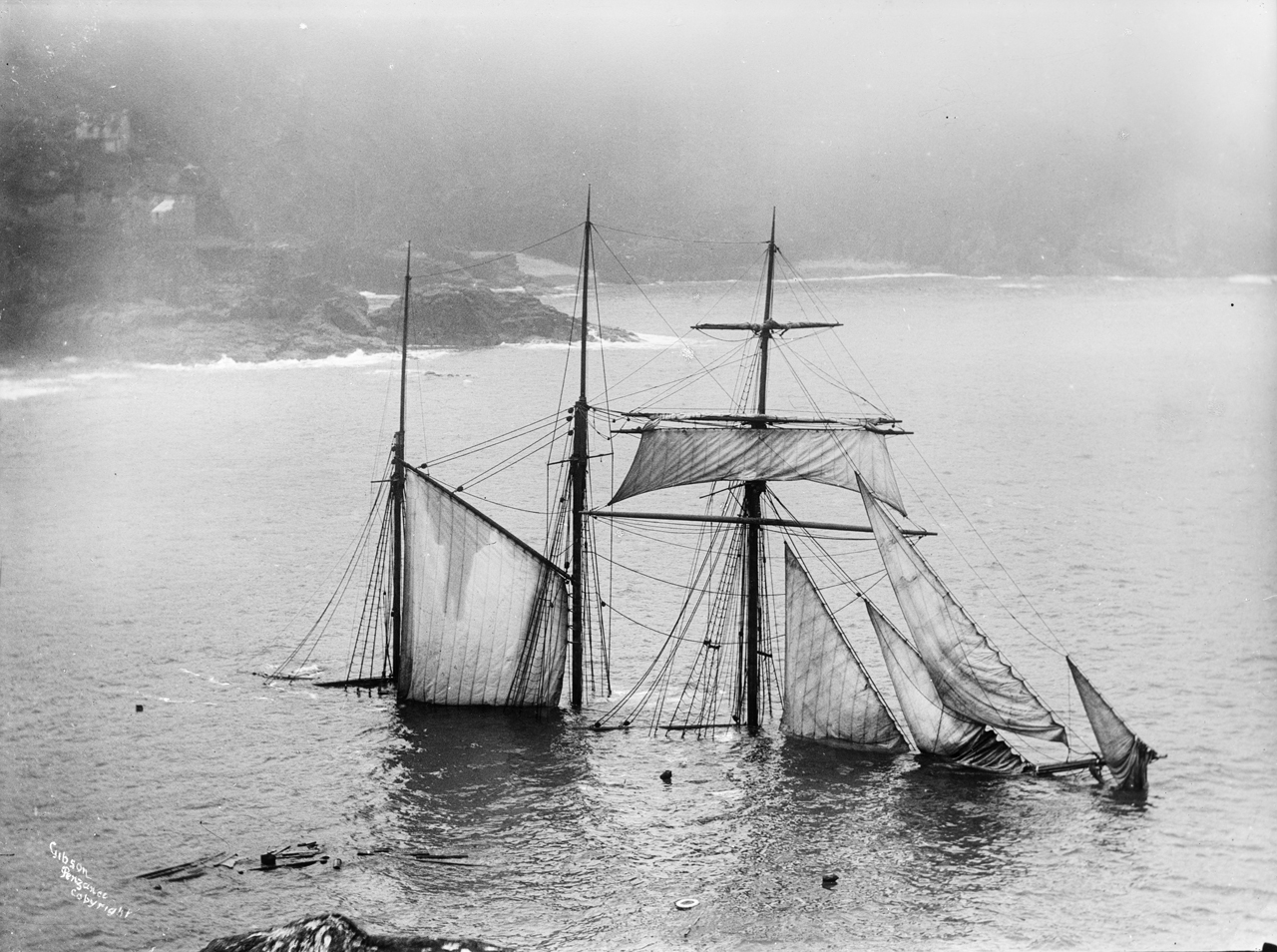
Shipwreck of the British schooner Mildred in 1913. The wreck of the Idler would have looked much the same.

James Corrigan was in his office in downtown Cleveland when the storm hit the city. He was greatly alarmed: The Idler was clearly late reaching the harbor, and he correctly surmised that the storm had hit the yacht. When the F.E. Smith and Effie B. reached port in Cleveland, he was immediately notified about the disaster.

John Corrigan had returned to Cleveland the morning of July 7 from Buffalo. John and his son-in-law, Edward G. Gilbert, met the two tugs at the dock and took the prostrate Mary Corrigan home.

Recovery efforts were complicated by a severe weather system that began passing over Ohio and Lake Erie about 5 PM on July 7. It did not exit the area until 9 PM on Monday. Patrols were made of the shoreline in Lorain and Cuyahoga counties in case the bodies washed ashore.

Despite the storm, the tugboats William Kennedy and George C. Lutz left Cleveland for the wreck, James Corrigan and his nephew, John Corrigan Jr., aboard the Lutz and Capt. Holmes aboard the Kennedy. The tugs reached the wreck site at 5:45 PM. No bodies could be seen. They placed lights on the masts to warn other vessels. There was worry that the Idler might roll over and the lights might sink beneath the surface, so a raft was built and anchored near the wreck. It, too, had lights on it.

Those who visited the Idler during this initial recovery effort confirmed that the mainsail, staysail, and jib sails were still up, and there was nothing to indicate that any attempt had been made to have them lowered. Only the fore staysail was partly down. Her kite sails were down and neatly clewed in place, and divers who visited the wreck a few days later said all of the sails were clear of the deck.

Late in the evening on July 7, the tug Ben Campbell was sent to wreck to find the bodies. Conditions on Lake Erie were too rough to permit any diving, and the tug returned to port. The Ben Campbell left for the wreck again at 3 AM on July 8. The tug spent most of the day on the water waiting for conditions to improve. When they did not, it returned to Cleveland at 4 PM.

On Monday, July 9, the storm abated and recovery efforts began. The tug Chauncey Morgan cruised near the wreck, searching for bodies, but large amounts of wreckage covering the lake made this difficult. James Corrigan, Morris A. Bradley, Albert R. Rumsey, and Frank Rieley, father-in-law of Mary Rieley, journeyed to the wreck aboard the tug George C. Lutz. Diver Walter Metcalf went down to search for bodies. He found the main cabin of the yacht full of floating debris that made his movements difficult and blocked his sight. After about 15 minutes, Metcalf found the body of Ida Belle Corrigan in the main cabin, about 15 feet (4.6 m) away from the companionway. After searching another half hour, Metcalf found Nettie Rieley's body in the top berth of the first bunk on the starboard side. After some rest, Metcalf and his assistant, Frank Schwab, found the body of Etta Corrigan in the lower berth of the starboard side room. All had on life preservers.

The two divers reported that two deadlights were open on the port side and one open on the starboard side.

Etta Corrigan's funeral was held at the John Corrigan home, on July 11, 1900. She was buried in Cleveland's Woodland Cemetery. The funeral of Ida Belle Corrigan and Nettie Corrigan Riley was conducted at the James Corrigan home by the Reverend Dr. S.P. Sprecher of Euclid Avenue Presbyterian Church. James Corrigan did not want the remains buried until all the other bodies were found, so they were temporarily interred in the public receiving vault of Wade Memorial Chapel at Cleveland's Lake View Cemetery.

=== Corrigan's personal search for the dead ===
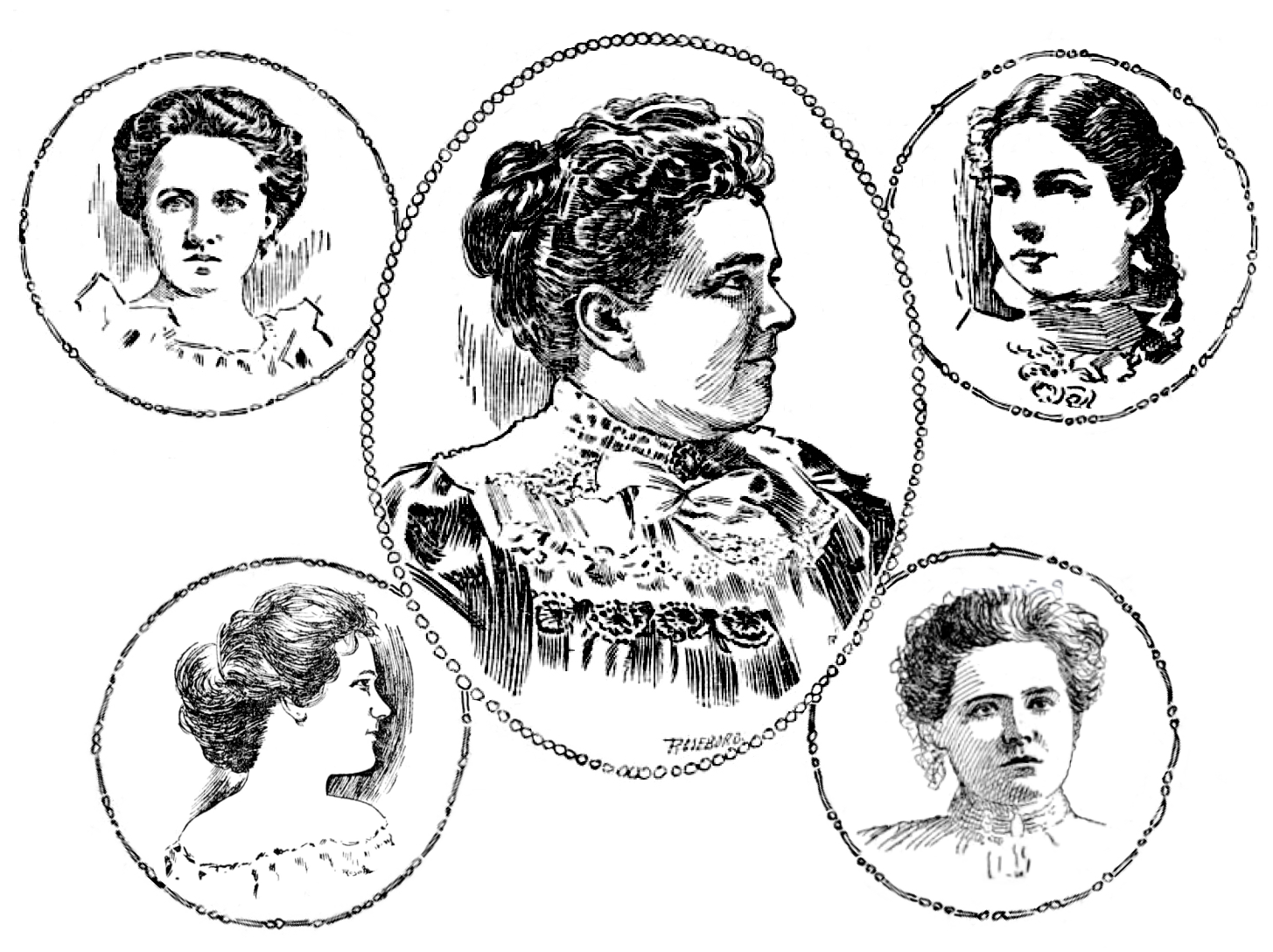
The Idler dead. Clockwise from upper left: Etta Corrigan, Ida May Corrigan, Nettie Corrigan Rieley, and Jane Corrigan. Center: Ida Belle Corrigan. Not shown: Infant Mary Rieley.

On July 16, an additional search of the lake bed where the Idler sank was made by a diver. Men aboard the tug Alva B. used 200 pounds (91 kg) of dynamite at the surface and lake bottom and dragged the lake bottom all day, but no bodies were recovered. On July 17, men aboard the tug George C. Lutz used 500 pounds (230 kg) of dynamite, dragged the bottom, and fired the brass cannon numerous time, but again no bodies were found. Launches continued to patrol the shore, in case the searchers missed a body and it washed ashore.

James Corrigan became desperate to find the bodies of the rest of his family. On July 23, he began offering "a liberal reward" to anyone who found them. He also had a glass-bottomed boat built to assist in the search. Recovery experts hoped that the area's warm weather would cause the bodies to rise to surface, but in the middle of August they gave up the search as hopeless.

Corrigan continued to look, spending $5,000 ($193,500 in 2025 dollars) looking for the bodies. After local life-saving stations ceased to send shore patrols out to look for the bodies, Corrigan hired men to do so along the shoreline from Cleveland to Buffalo. He also employed several gasoline-powered launches to patrol the shore and to drag the nearshore with grappling hooks. He asked all merchant ship captains to be on the lookout for bodies, offering to pay a reward to whoever found the bodies as well as the cost of bringing the two women's remains to him.

In late July, Corrigan chartered the steamship Urania to search Canadian waters for the bodies. He searched the wreck site again in early August using his glass-bottomed boat, and hired diver Walter Metcalf to walk over the entire site to see if the corpses were in the mud of the lake bottom. He also hired a tugboat to search the waters off Sandusky, Ohio.

During this time, Corrigan barely spent any time working. He aged noticeably, and the emotional toll left his health broken.

=== Discovery of the last bodies ===
The body of the infant Mary Rieley was discovered in the cabin of the Idler after she was refloated on July 15. A funeral was held at Wade Memorial Chapel, conducted by Rev. Abel P. Buel, a retired Baptist minister and friend of the Corrigan family. Baby Mary was temporarily interred in the receiving vault next to her mother.

Ida May Corrigan's body was found on August 29. Her body was floating in Lake Erie about 4 miles (6.4 km) from the disaster site by the passenger steamer City of Detroit. (Note: The exact location is confused. The Plain Dealer said it was 4 miles south of the wreck site, while the Cleveland Leader said it was four miles north of the wreck site.) (Note: It is unclear who spotted the body. The Plain Dealer said pilot M. McLaughlin spotted her remains directly in front of the steamer. The Cleveland Leader claimed passenger H.J. Latimer first spotted it. In an amazing coincidence, Latimer had served with James Corrigan, son of John Corrigan, in the 5th Ohio Volunteer Infantry regiment during the Spanish–American War. Latimer refused to accept the reward for finding it.) Four other boats had recently passed by and seen nothing, so it was presumed that the remains had only recently risen to the surface. The body was badly decomposed and the features unrecognizable, but Ida May was identified by the brown suit she was wearing and her jewelry and locket. James Corrigan gave each of the four men who retrieved the body from the water a $50 ($1,935 in 2025 dollars) reward. No funeral was immediately held, and she was temporarily interred in the Lake View Cemetery receiving vault.

Jane Corrigan's body was found on September 28. Her remains were discovered 3 miles (4.8 km) west of Willoughby, Ohio (at what is now the village of Timberlake beach). (Note: The press reported different versions of the discovery. The Cleveland Leader newspaper said two fisherman offshore spotted a body on the beach, partially buried in sand. The Plain Dealer newspaper said the body was found floating in the lake.) Her remains were also very badly decomposed. One arm was missing, and her clothes were in shreds. James Corrigan was out of town on business, so Frank Rieley and Jane's brother, James Corrigan Jr., identified the remains by the shoes and brown skirt Jane had worn and a cuff button engraved with her initials. As with the other family members, Jane's body was placed in Lake View's receiving vault.

A funeral at Wade Chapel was held for Ida May and Jane Corrigan on October 6, with the Rev. Dr. S.P. Sprecher officiating.

Ida Belle, Nettie, Jane, Ida May, and baby Mary were interred in the Corrigan family plot at Lake View Cemetery on October 9. (Note: According to Woodland Cemetery records, Etta Corrigan was disinterred and moved to the Corrigan family plot in Lake View Cemetery on November 5, 1909.)

== Local public opinion ==
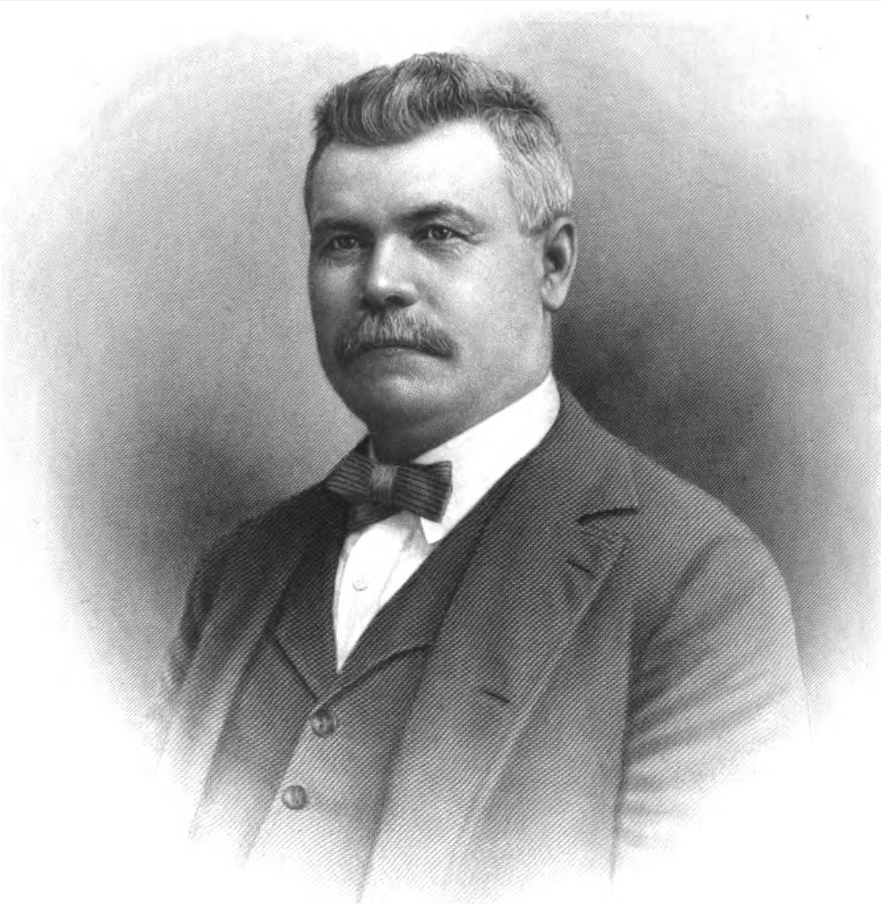
"I consider negligence on the part of Captain Holmes as being the cause of the disaster. When we arrived at the scene of the accident, we saw the mainsail and foresail in a position indicating that they had not been taken in, as they should have been under the circumstances." — James Corrigan

James and John Corrigan believed that Holmes had not properly captained the Idler. The consensus of Cleveland boatmen, too, was that Holmes had been careless. Experienced local yachtsmen said much smaller boats had passed safely through much worse storms, and proper handling should have easily brought the Idler through. A.R. Landreth Jr., secretary of the Cleveland Yacht Club, noted that "Yachtsmen have gone through squalls time and time again, many of them more severe than yesterday's storm, and they have done it in twenty-five and thirty-foot boats, boats much smaller than the Idler, and have come through without the slightest accident."

=== Failure to take down all sails ===
Newspapers reported that anonymous Cleveland yachtsmen said the failure to take in all sails as soon as the storm was spotted was a critical error. It was standard practice, they claimed, for a yacht to close all deadlights, companionways, and hatches and get sail down long before a squall hits. "[T]he only safe way to meet a squall is with all canvas down", one veteran sailor said. Local yachtsman G.H. Gardner told the press, "With her sails furled, the Idler could have weathered any storm." Capt. Martin O'Toole of the Ogemaw agreed. At best, Holmes should have kept only a staysail up: "If they had done that," he said, "it would have been as safe in that boat as it is on the inside of a house in a rain storm."

Holmes admitted the yacht had too much sail on for such a storm, but claimed that no one could have anticipated that a simple squall would become that severe. "[A]ny man who would carry the sail which the yacht had on in a sixty-five mile wind would be a fool. I never expected such a wind," he said on July 19.

=== The severity of the storm ===
Local sailing experts disagreed that the storm was a severe one. Charles W. Kelly, the second-highest-ranking member of the Cleveland Yacht Club, felt the storm that hit the Idler was no worse than most. "There is not a yachtsman on the lake who has not been through storms as severe as this without the slightest damage," he said. An officer on the passenger steamer City of the Straits, which was only a few miles south of the Idler during the weather event, said he saw no evidence of a severe storm over the water. (Note: The City of the Straits was headed west, making its daily run between Cleveland and Put-in-Bay on South Bass Island, (85 miles (137 km) east-northeast of Cleveland).) Local sailing experts said this indicated the squall was more severe along the shoreline than over the lake.

Nor were the waves particularly bad. Sailors in Cleveland said the sea wasn't running very high at all. "As far as any sea was concerned," the captain of the Ogemaw said, "a birch bark canoe could have lived in it, and without being skillfully managed either." Local 14-year-old Eddie Dahike was in a small sailboat off the mouth of Euclid Creek just east of Cleveland. He, too, said the sea was not high, or he would have been swamped.

Critics of Holmes pointed out that much smaller craft came through the same storm easily, contradicting the claim that the squall was severe. A hooker and a small gasoline-powered launch were following the Ogemaw, and both came through the storm without any problems.

Holmes argued that the Idler had encountered no simple squall, but "a cyclone". Mate Samuel Biggam called it "a hurricane". Holmes later asserted that the Idler would have sunk in such a violent storm even if all its sails had been taken down because the deadlights were open.

=== Other issues ===
Yacht club head Landreth criticized Holmes for not having the right experience to handle a yacht: "I understand from the newspapers that the captain of the Idler was a vessel-man and not a yachtsman. It is a great mistake to think that a man who has handled large vessels can sail a yacht."

Holmes also alleged equipment failure, saying that the Idler failed to answer her helm and come into the wind. Jacob Antonson confirmed Holmes's claim. Local yachtsmen, however, noted that the mainsail would have brought the Idler into the wind at once if the helm were not answering.

== County coroner's investigation ==
On Tuesday, July 10, the entire crew of the Idler, except for Capt. Holmes, was called to the law offices of Goulder, Holding & Masten in downtown Cleveland, where they were closely questioned by Corrigan attorney Harvey D. Goulder. All made signed statements, but Goulder said he learned nothing that had not already been printed in local newspapers.

Although the accident happened in the waters of Lorain County, by law the inquest was held in Cuyahoga County, where the bodies came ashore. (Note: There was initial concern that the county coroner could not hold an inquest, because the county's jurisdiction extended only 4 miles (6.4 km) offshore. The United States had jurisdiction from the four-mile line to the Canadian border.) Because the Idler was not large enough to require a sailing master (Note: Federal law at the time required a sailing master for any vessel over (700 short tons (640 t)).) and was not a steamer (steamship captains had to be licensed), the county coroner could claim jurisdiction along with the federal government.

The coroner's inquest began on the morning of July 18. All the crew were subpoenaed. Biggam's testimony was critical of Holmes. Without directly blaming the captain, he said, "Had the yacht been stripped she would have been all right." Severn Neilson also "would have ordered in more sail than was taken in." According to the local press, Holmes denied every incriminating statement made by all other members of the crew. He specifically denied having too much sail up, saying, "when the squall struck us, we were under storm canvas." Holmes blamed Biggam for not closing the deadlights after being ordered to do so. "...it seems very strange to me that he did not close the deadlights," he testified. "It was an easy thing to do, as it was on the weather side."

On November 10, 1900, the Cuyahoga County Coroner rendered a verdict of accidental death, and Capt. Holmes was freed. The Cleveland press had widely anticipated a finding of negligence, but the coroner required additional testimony. He didn't get it: Samuel Biggam had gone to Louisville, Kentucky, and the Norwegian crew had returned to Norway. The only uncontested testimony the coroner had regarded the death of Ida May Corrigan, and he found no one to blame for her drowning.

== Federal manslaughter charge ==
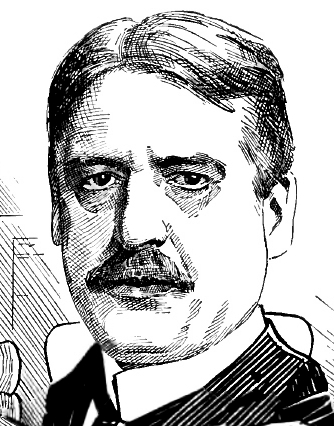
Judge Francis J. Wing (depicted) of the U.S. District Court for the Northern District of Ohio oversaw the manslaughter trial of Capt. Holmes.

Captain Charles J. Holmes was arrested on July 18, 1900, by U.S. Marshal J.J. Kelley. United States Attorney John J. Sullivan charged him with manslaughter under a federal law which held ship captains responsible for "misconduct, negligence, or inattention to his duties". Bail was set at $1,000 ($38,700 in 2025 dollars). Holmes sought out James Corrigan to post his bail, but Corrigan refused to see him. Local doctor J.R. Smith, who had been attending Holmes after since July 7, agreed to post bail for him.

Holmes attempted to flee the city, and sought Dr. Smith for assistance. Smith turned him over to the police, and withdrew his bail. Imprisoned again, Holmes secured bail on July 21 from his defense attorney, Ernest M. Shay of the law firm of Canfield & Shay.

On October 11, 1900, a federal grand jury began hearing testimony in the manslaughter case. Holmes testified before it, as did several sailing and navigation experts. The jury also read the sworn depositions of the crew, and model of the yacht was displayed to aid the jury in understanding nautical terms. Holmes was indicted for manslaughter the next day.

Holmes pleaded not guilty before Judge Francis J. Wing of the United States District Court for the Northern District of Ohio on October 12. He withdrew his plea on October 29 so that his attorneys could file a demurrer, arguing that the federal nautical manslaughter law only applied to steam vessels. The district court denied the demurrer on November 9.

Holmes won a postponement of his trial in February 1901 on the grounds that his witnesses (the Norwegian crew) needed to be brought to Cleveland. Trial was rescheduled for April 17, but Holmes left Cleveland and could not be found.

Holmes turned himself in to the court on May 23. He claimed that he took a job on the steamer Gold Seeker, which was plying the Caribbean Sea. The vessel should have returned to New York City in time for him to reach Cleveland for his trial, but he claimed severe storms in the region delayed it. The court accepted his story, but required him to post higher bond, which he was unable to secure. (Note: Holmes accused James Corrigan of pressuring bondsmen to refuse him.) On August 17, Holmes was set free after Cleveland Mayor Tom L. Johnson and local contractor John Carron supplied his bond.

Trial was due to begin on October 7, 1901, but the court delayed it again after Holmes's attorney fell seriously ill.

Trial was rescheduled for February 19, 1902. As the trial date approached, however, the prosecution became worried because its key witness, Samuel Biggam, could not be found. Biggam had been served with a subpoena at his home in Louisville, Kentucky, but had now disappeared. Judge Wing nolled the case at request of the U.S. Attorney on February 19.

The press speculated that the real reason the case was dropped was that James Corrigan's desire to prosecute had waned. Harry Goulder, Corrigan's attorney, denied such rumors. He said that he and Corrigan had been very surprised to learn that the case had been nolled.

== Salvaging the Idler ==
=== Raising the yacht ===
Immediately after the disaster, James Corrigan said he wanted to blow the Idler apart with dynamite. He changed his mind on July 10, and turned title to the boat over to his friend, Albert R. Rumsey.

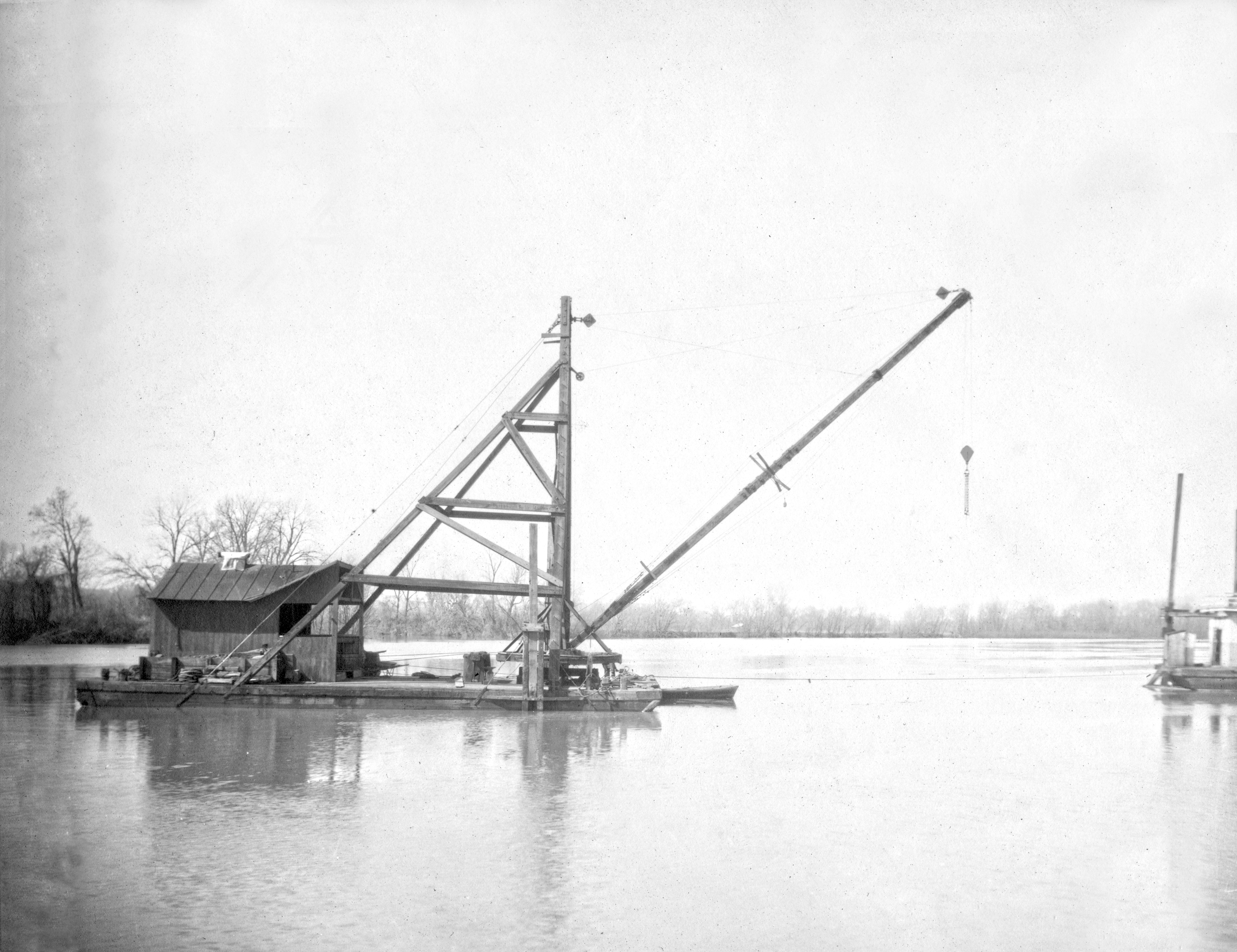
A U.S. Army Corps of Engineers derrick service ship in 1923. The Jumbo would have looked very much like this vessel.

Work on raising the Idler began on July 11. The tugs William Kennedy and Tom Maytham, (Note: Both were owned by Great Lakes Towing.) accompanied by the derrick-equipped service ship Jumbo, (Note: Jumbo was owned by the L.P. & J.A. Smith Co.) reached the wreck at about 6 AM. Albert Rumsey, James Corrigan, and Frank Rieley were aboard the Kennedy. A diver searched around stern for any sign of bodies, and then nailed the companionway door and hatch shut and cut away nearly all the remaining canvas. With the yacht about 4 feet (1.2 m) deep in the mud, the intent was to pass an anchor chain back and forth under the hull until the ship was free. Tugs would then lift the bow, and drag the Idler into port. Two divers managed to get the 200-foot (61 m) long anchor chain under the stern, and the two tugs gradually worked the chain toward the bow. They managed to drag it back again to the foremast but a squall prevented further activity.

On July 12, the tugs William Kennedy and Dreadnought, accompanied by the Jumbo, returned to the wreck. Mid-morning, the Dreadnought returned to port for rope and grappling hooks, and managed to obtain a 4-foot (1.2 m) long brass cannon. James Corrigan was convinced the bodies of Jane and Ida May lay in the mud near the wreck, and intended to drag the bottom with the hooks. The cannon was fired to bring the bodies to the surface. (Note: It was widely believed at the time that a corpse could stay submerged for up to a week. Firing a cannon over the water, it was thought, created shock waves that would rock a decomposed corpse loose from any mud. Full of decompositional gases, the corpse would then rise to the surface.) The lake became rough again in early afternoon, and work was suspended. A raft was anchored to site of wreck, to mark the exact location of the shipwreck.

Jumbo and the tugs William Kennedy and George C. Lutz made a third, and successful, attempt at raising the Idler on July 13. Two divers spent the morning inspecting the deck and rigging for bodies, and found nothing. Chains were once more passed beneath the sunken vessel. At 2 PM, the Idler broke free of the bottom. The ship proved heavier than expected, so the Dreadnought was called for. While waiting for the third tug, chains were fastened to the bow of the Idler, and the Jumbo raised the forward portion of the ship off the lake bottom. The three boats had trouble turning the yacht around to face southwest. With Kennedy and Lutz towing the wreck and the Dreadnought helping to push the Jumbo, the Idler began to be towed toward shore at 4:50 PM.

By 2 AM on Saturday, July 14, the Idler was 4 to 4.5 miles (6.4 to 7.2 km) from shore. The yacht was within a few hundred feet of the entrance to the port of Cleveland's breakwater when she ran aground at 1 PM. It took the Jumbo three hours to free her, during which time people rowed out to the wreck to break off bits of the hull as keepsakes. The tug Harvey Goulder replaced the William Kennedy, and it and the George C. Lutz towed the Idler within the breakwater at 6 PM.

The Dreadnought, which had very little draft, beached he Idler in about 20 feet (6.1 m) of water 1,000 feet (300 m) off the Great Lakes Dredge & Dock Co., her bow facing west. She listed to starboard at a 45 degree angle, her railing about 6 feet (1.8 m) under water. It had taken 35 hours to move her 16 miles (26 km). The deck was a tangle of chain, rope, and wreckage. Nearly all the stays were broken, and the overhang and forefoot damaged (apparently because the yacht struck the bottom bow-first). (Note: The bowsprit was broken off during the tow toward the harbor.) The hull was sound, and the starboard lifeboat was still lashed to the davits.

=== Refloating the ship ===
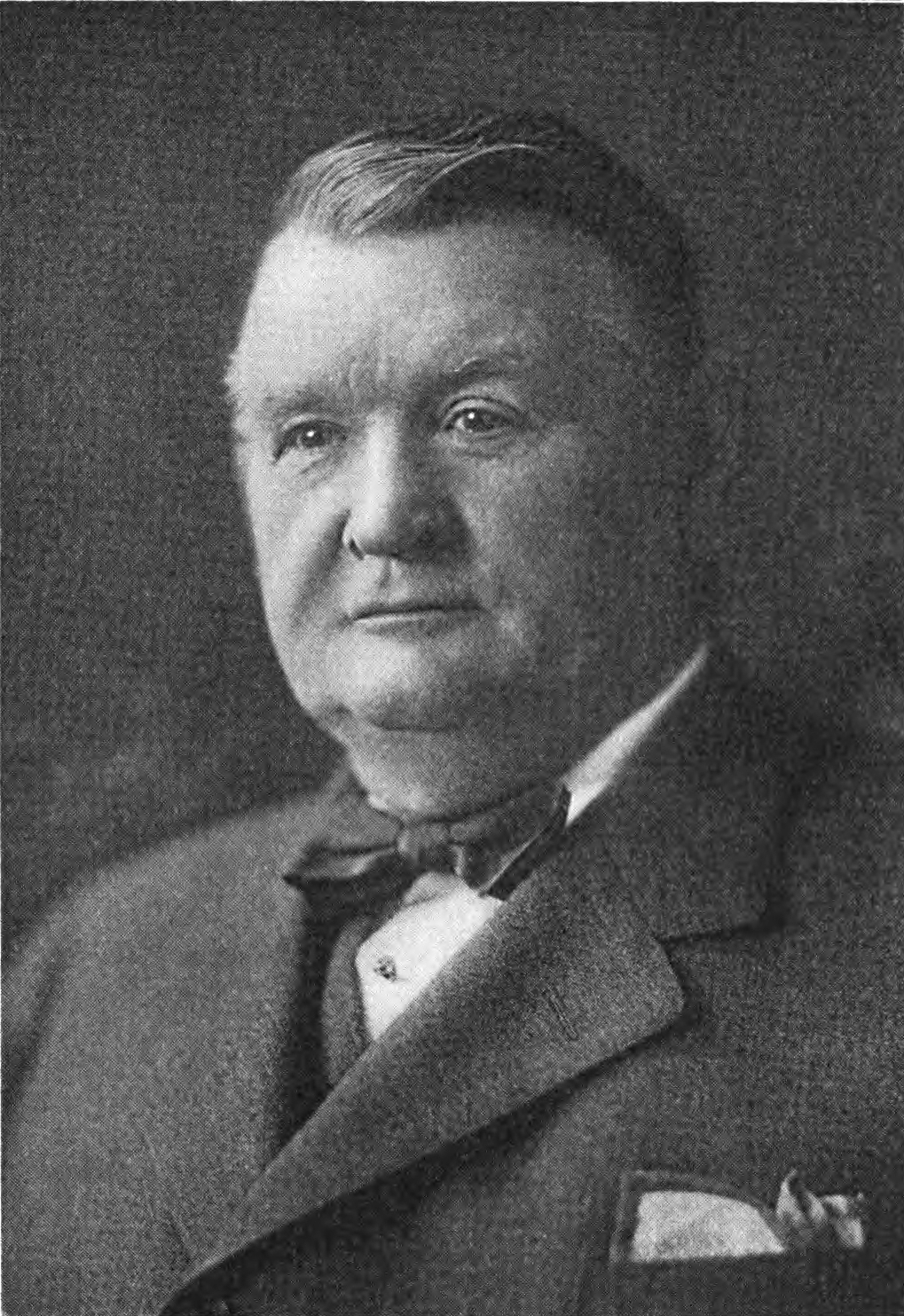
James Corrigan gave the Idler to Albert R. Rumsey (depicted) after the accident.

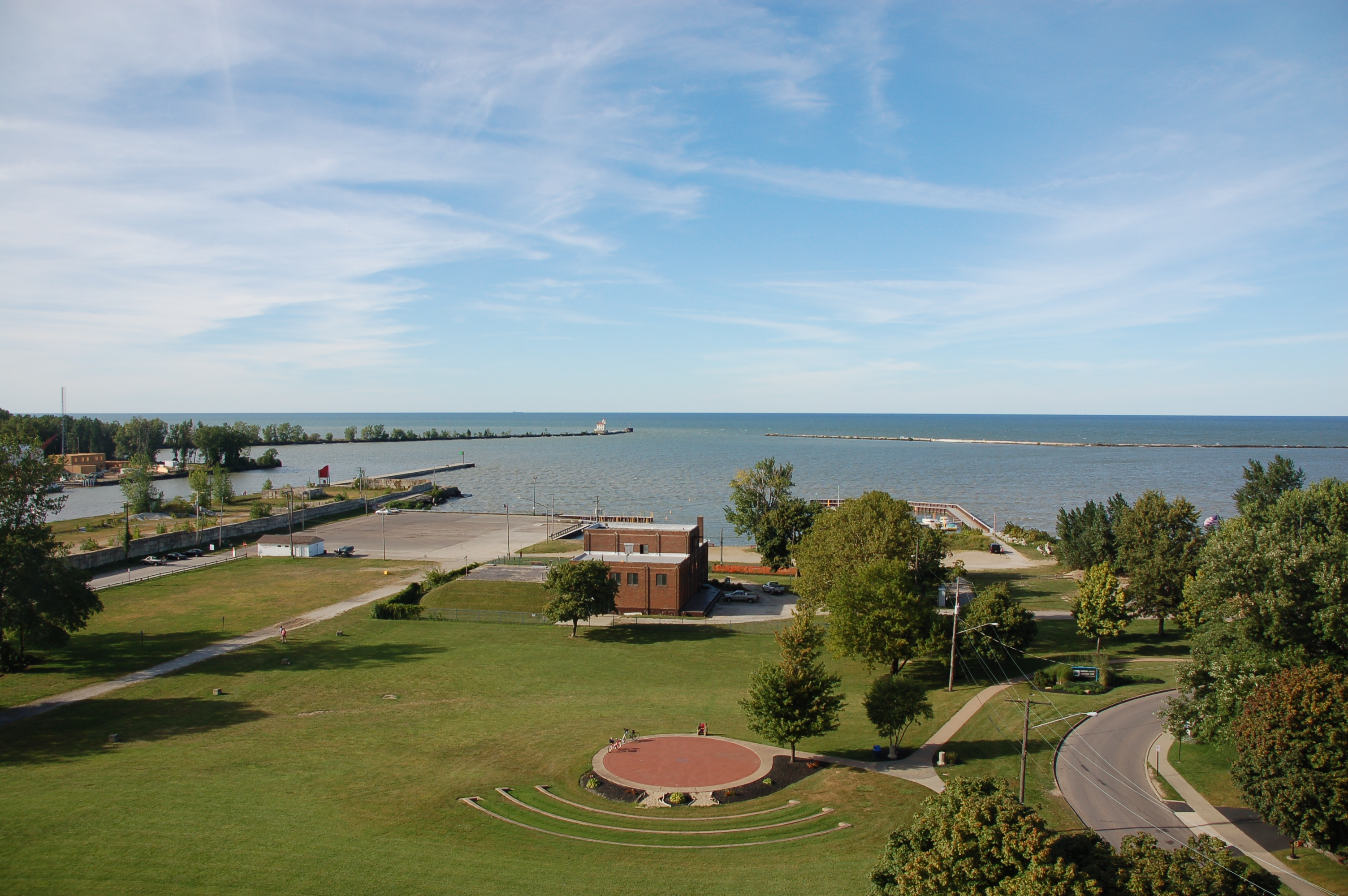
Harbor at Fairport, Ohio. The Idler sank just offshore after ice in the Grand River pushed her out of the harbor.

Some work on making the Idler watertight was done Saturday at dusk, but the vessel was listing too badly to do much work. A tug remained by the ship all night to keep watch.

At 6 AM on Sunday, July 15, work began on refloating the Idler. James Corrigan, John Corrigan, and Frank Rieley were on site all day. The tug Dreadnought attached a rope to the Idler's main mast, and pulled her level in five minutes. The deadlights were closed, and divers sealed every opening they could find to make the wreck as watertight as possible. The suction dredge Ohio, towed by the tugs Ben Campbell and Chamberlain, (Note: The Ben Campbell suffered damage to her steering gear at 1 PM, and the Dreadnought took her place.) moved alongside, and its suction hose was run into the companionway. A screen at the mouth of the hose prevented pieces of debris from being vacuumed up.

At 2:15 PM, after just a few minutes of work, half the water inside the ship was gone. There was so much debris against the screen that diver Walter Metcalf had to go down into the cabin to clear it. He discovered the corpse of the infant Mary Rieley against the screen. Metcalf suggested that the body had likely floated against the cabin ceiling, where a mass of mattresses, furniture, hangings, clothing, and other items were also floating, obscuring the corpse from view. The body was badly decomposed.

At James Corrigan's request, five men wearing diving suits (but not helmets) then went aboard the wreck and removed the skylights over the cabin. As many items as could be removed from the cabin were hoisted out of the skylight, in case the bodies of Ida May or Jane were to be found there. An unidentified worker attempted to set aside and conceal a bag containing several hundred dollars' worth of jewelry, but the captain of the Ohio spotted the bag and turned it over to John Corrigan.

The Ohio ceased pumping at 4:30 PM. A suction pipe from the tug Chamberlain was used to finish emptying the Idler.

During the refloating effort, the harbor was jammed with launches, rafts, and rowboats as gawkers tried to get a look at the wreck. One entrepreneur charged 10 cents per ride to take people out to the wreck. Souvenir hunters tore pieces from the hull and cut away any scraps of sail they could get hold of. There were so many craft crowding the wreck that the tugs and suction dredge found it hard to work.

At 5:45 PM on July 15, a tug began towing the refloated Idler into the Cuyahoga River. She arrived at Shipbuilder's Drydock at 6:45 PM. Rumsey hired Samuel Biggam to lead the cleanup of the ship.

=== Second sinking of the Idler ===
Rumsey had the Idler towed to Fairport, Ohio, on October 17 by the Harry D. Goulder. It was tied up there for a year. Rumsey initially planned to have the yacht rebuilt as a steam-powered vessel, but abandoned this idea in October 1901 and had it stripped of all usable material. The Idler was still being stripped when, in late August 1902, two sailors broke into the ship and stole several items.

On January 22, 1904, an ice jam on the Grand River swept the Idler and several other vessels out onto Lake Erie. The yacht was towed back to her berth, but on March 24 another ice jam broke the Idler free and took her 300 feet (91 m) out onto the lake. This time, the lake ice pierced the yacht's hull, and she sank. Rumsey sold the wreck, and the new owner intended to salvage the 6 short tons (5.4 t) of pig iron ballast. He failed to take any action, and the United States Army Corps of Engineers dismantled and removed the wreck.

== Bibliography ==
- Bellamy, John Stark (2010). The Last Days of Cleveland: And More True Tales of Crime and Disaster From Cleveland's Past. Cleveland: Gray & Company. ISBN 9781598510676.
- Jensen, John Odin (2019). Stories From the Wreckage: A Great Lakes Maritime History Inspired By Shipwrecks. Madison, Wisc.: Wisconsin Historical Society Press. ISBN 9780870209024.
- King, JoAnn (2003). Letha E. House: From Foundling to Philanthropist. Medina, Ohio: Medina Historical Society. ISBN 9780974648309.
- Kingman, Dan C. (1904). Annual Reports of the War Department for the Year Ended June 30, 1904. Vol. VII: Report of the Chief of Engineers: Part 3. P. P. II Removing Sunken Vessels or Craft obstructing or Endangering Navigation (Report). Washington, D.C.: Government Printing Office.
- Mansfield, John Brandt (1899). History of the Great Lakes, in Two Volumes: Illustrated. Volume II. Chicago: J.H. Beers & Co. OCLC 5721692.
