= NASA (Swedish band) =

Swedish synthpop band

NASA was a Swedish synthpop band, fronted by Patrik Henzel and Martin Thors and named after the space agency. They debuted in 1983 with a song for a Swedish film. In 1985, they had a Swedish top ten hit with "Paula". In the 1980s, the band had little success outside of Sweden. A planned U.S. album was recorded, but then shelved by Columbia Records. They continued to have numerous hit singles in their home country of Sweden. They were basically defunct for most of the 1990s, but had a resurgence with the album Remembering the Future in 1999.

Henzel died in 2020 at the age of 54.
