= Davor Kraljević =

Croatian footballer

Personal information
- Full name: Davor Kraljević
- Date of birth: 7 July 1978 (age 48)
- Place of birth: Varaždin, SR Croatia
- Height: 1.83 m (6 ft 0 in)
- Position: Defender

Senior career*
Years	Team	Apps	(Gls)
–2000	Varteks	0	(0)
2000–2001	Tennis Borussia Berlin	9	(0)
2003–2004	SV Babelsberg 03	1	(0)
2005–2007	1. FC Heidenheim	28	(2)
2007–2009	SSV Ulm 1846	58	(5)
2010–2016	1. FC Heiningen		
2016–2017	SV Eversbach		

International career
1998	Croatia U-20	2	(0)
- * Club domestic league appearances and goals

Davor Kraljević (born 7 July 1978 in Varaždin) is a Croatian retired footballer.

== Club career ==
Kraljević started his footballing career at his hometown club NK Varteks and won two caps for the Croatian U-20 team before moving to Germany in 2000. Having made 9 appearances for Tennis Borussia Berlin, he later played for SV Babelsberg 03 and 1. FC Heidenheim 1846 before signing for SSV Ulm 1846 in 2007.

In November 2009, having made 58 appearances for Ulm, Kraljević was released and his contract was terminated for his role in the 2009 European football betting scandal. Despite not having not been charged, it was announced in May 2010 that Kraljević had signed for the Kreisliga team 1. FC Heiningen.
