= 1900 in the United States =

- Decades: 1880s; 1890s; 1900s; 1910s; 1920s
- See also: History of the United States (1865–1918); Timeline of United States history (1900–1929); List of years in the United States

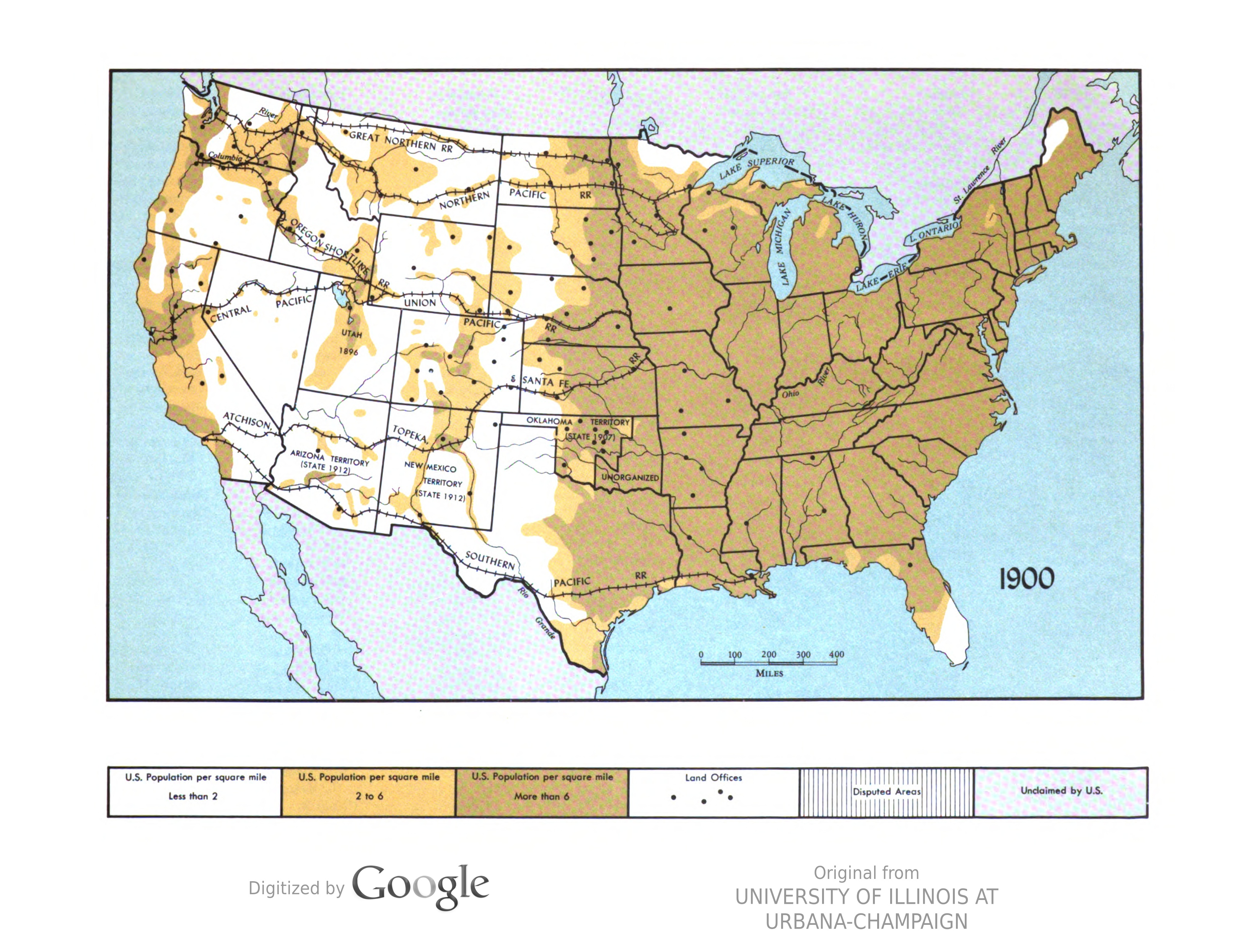
1900 in the United States

Events from the year 1900 in the United States.

== Incumbents ==
=== Federal government ===
- President: William McKinley (R-Ohio)
- Vice President: vacant
- Chief Justice: Melville Fuller (Illinois)
- Speaker of the House of Representatives: David B. Henderson (R-Iowa)
- Congress: 56th

==== State governments ====
Governors and lieutenant governors

=== Governors ===
- Governor of Alabama: Joseph F. Johnston (Democratic) (until December 1), William J. Samford (Democratic) (starting December 1)
- Governor of Arkansas: Daniel Webster Jones (Democratic)
- Governor of California: Henry Gage (Republican)
- Governor of Colorado: Charles Spalding Thomas (Democratic)
- Governor of Connecticut: George E. Lounsbury (Republican)
- Governor of Delaware: Ebe W. Tunnell (Democratic)
- Governor of Florida: William D. Bloxham (Democratic)
- Governor of Georgia: Allen D. Candler (Democratic)
- Governor of Idaho: Frank Steunenberg (Democratic)
- Governor of Illinois: John Riley Tanner (Republican)
- Governor of Indiana: James A. Mount (Republican)
- Governor of Iowa: Leslie M. Shaw (Republican)
- Governor of Kansas: William E. Stanley (Republican)
- Governor of Kentucky:
  - until January 30: William S. Taylor (Republican)
  - January 30-February 3: William Goebel (Democratic)
  - starting February 3: J. C. W. Beckham (Democratic)
- Governor of Louisiana: Murphy James Foster, Sr. (Democratic) (until May 8), William Wright Heard (Democratic) (starting May 8)
- Governor of Maine: Llewellyn Powers (Republican)
- Governor of Maryland: Lloyd Lowndes, Jr. (Republican) (until January 10), John Walter Smith (Democratic) (starting January 10)
- Governor of Massachusetts: Roger Wolcott (Republican) (until January 4), Winthrop Murray Crane (Republican) (starting January 4)
- Governor of Michigan: Hazen S. Pingree (Republican)
- Governor of Minnesota: John Lind (Democratic)
- Governor of Mississippi: Anselm J. McLaurin (Democratic) (until January 16), Andrew H. Longino (Democratic) (starting January 16)
- Governor of Missouri: Lon Vest Stephens (Democratic)
- Governor of Montana: Robert Burns Smith (Democratic)
- Governor of Nebraska: William A. Poynter (Democratic)
- Governor of Nevada: Reinhold Sadler (Silver)
- Governor of New Hampshire: Frank W. Rollins (Republican)
- Governor of New Jersey: Foster MacGowan Voorhees (Republican)
- Governor of New York: Theodore Roosevelt (Republican) (until end of December 31)
- Governor of North Carolina: Daniel Lindsay Russell (Republican)
- Governor of North Dakota: Frederick B. Fancher (Republican)
- Governor of Ohio: Asa S. Bushnell (Republican) (until January 8), George K. Nash (Republican) (starting January 8)
- Governor of Oregon: T. T. Geer (Republican)
- Governor of Pennsylvania: William A. Stone (Republican)
- Governor of Rhode Island: Elisha Dyer, Jr. (Republican) (until May 29), William Gregory (Republican) (starting May 29)
- Governor of South Carolina: Miles Benjamin McSweeney (Democratic)
- Governor of South Dakota: Andrew E. Lee (Populist)
- Governor of Tennessee: Benton McMillin (Democratic)
- Governor of Texas: Joseph D. Sayers (Democratic)
- Governor of Utah: Heber Manning Wells (Republican)
- Governor of Vermont: Edward Curtis Smith (Republican) (until October 4), William W. Stickney (Republican) (starting October 4)
- Governor of Virginia: James Hoge Tyler (Democratic)
- Governor of Washington: John Rankin Rogers (Populist)/(Democratic)
- Governor of West Virginia: George W. Atkinson (Republican)
- Governor of Wisconsin: Edward Scofield (Republican)
- Governor of Wyoming: DeForest Richards (Republican)

=== Lieutenant governors ===
- Lieutenant Governor of California: Jacob H. Neff (Republican)
- Lieutenant Governor of Colorado: Francis Patrick Carney (Populist)
- Lieutenant Governor of Connecticut: Lyman A. Mills (Republican)
- Lieutenant Governor of Idaho: J. H. Hutchinson (Democratic)
- Lieutenant Governor of Illinois: William Northcott (Republican)
- Lieutenant Governor of Indiana: William S. Haggard (Republican)
- Lieutenant Governor of Iowa: James C. Milliman (Republican)
- Lieutenant Governor of Kansas: Harry E. Richter (Republican)
- Lieutenant Governor of Kentucky:
  - until January 30: John Marshall (Republican)
  - January 31-February 3: J. C. W. Beckham (Democratic)
  - starting February 3: vacant
- Lieutenant Governor of Louisiana: Robert H. Snyder (Democratic) (until May 8), Albert Estopinal (Democratic) (starting May 8)
- Lieutenant Governor of Massachusetts: Winthrop M. Crane (Republican) (until January 4), John L. Bates (Republican) (starting January 4)
- Lieutenant Governor of Michigan: Orrin W. Robinson (Republican)
- Lieutenant Governor of Minnesota: Lyndon A. Smith (Republican)
- Lieutenant Governor of Mississippi: J. H. Jones (Democratic) (until month and day unknown), James T. Harrison (Democratic) (starting month and day unknown)
- Lieutenant Governor of Missouri: August Bolte (Democratic)
- Lieutenant Governor of Montana: Archibald E. Spriggs (political party unknown)
- Lieutenant Governor of Nebraska: Edward A. Gilbert (Republican)
- Lieutenant Governor of Nevada: James R. Judge (political party unknown)
- Lieutenant Governor of New York: Timothy L. Woodruff (Republican)
- Lieutenant Governor of North Carolina: Charles A. Reynolds (Republican)
- Lieutenant Governor of North Dakota: vacant
- Lieutenant Governor of Ohio: Asa W. Jones (Republican) (until January 8), John A. Caldwell (Republican) (starting January 8)
- Lieutenant Governor of Pennsylvania: John P. S. Gobin (Republican)
- Lieutenant Governor of Rhode Island: William Gregory (Republican) (until May 29), Charles Kimball (Republican) (starting May 29)
- Lieutenant Governor of South Carolina: Robert B. Scarborough (Democratic)
- Lieutenant Governor of South Dakota: John T. Kean (Republican)
- Lieutenant Governor of Tennessee: Seid Waddell (Democratic)
- Lieutenant Governor of Texas: James Browning (Democratic)
- Lieutenant Governor of Vermont: Henry C. Bates (Republican) (until October 4), Martin F. Allen (Republican) (starting October 4)
- Lieutenant Governor of Virginia: Edward Echols (Democratic)
- Lieutenant Governor of Washington: Thurston Daniels (Populist)
- Lieutenant Governor of Wisconsin: Jesse Stone (Republican)

== Events ==
=== January–March ===
- January 1 – Hawaii asks for a delegate at the U.S. Republican National Convention.
- January 2
  - John Hay announces the Open Door Policy to promote trade with China.
  - The first electric bus becomes operational in New York City.
- January 3
  - The United States Census estimates the country's population was 76 million.
  - Giuseppe Verdi's opera Aida makes its U.S. debut.
- January 5 – Dr. Henry A. Rowland of Johns Hopkins University discovers the cause of the Earth's magnetism.
- January 8 – President of the United States William McKinley places Alaska under military rule.
- January 14 – The United States Senate accepts the Anglo-German treaty of 1899, in which the United Kingdom renounces its claims to the Samoan islands.
- January 17
  - Brigham H. Roberts is refused a seat in the United States House of Representatives because of his polygamy.
  - Yaqui Indians in Texas proclaim independence from Mexico.
- January 29 – The American League of Professional Baseball Clubs is organized in Philadelphia, Pennsylvania with 8 founding teams.
- February 3 – Kentucky Governor William Goebel dies of wounds after being shot by assassins on January 30. Goebel, who had prevailed in a dispute over the winner of the 1899 election, had been sworn in on his deathbed.
- February 5 – Britain and the United States sign a treaty for the building of a Central American shipping canal through Nicaragua.
- February 7
  - San Francisco plague of 1900–1904 begins.
  - After a 13-day special session, the California legislature votes for Thomas R. Bard to fill the vacancy for its U.S. Senator vacant since March 1899.
- February 9 – Dwight F. Davis creates the Davis Cup tennis tournament.
- March 5 – Two U.S. cruisers are sent to Central America to protect U.S. interests in a dispute between Nicaragua and Costa Rica.
- March 6 – A coal mine explosion in West Virginia kills 50 miners.
- March 15 – The Gold Standard Act is ratified, placing United States currency on the gold standard.
- March 24 – New York City Mayor Robert Anderson Van Wyck breaks ground for a new underground "Rapid Transit Railroad" that will link Manhattan and Brooklyn.

=== April–June ===
- April 30
  - Hawaii becomes an official U.S. territory
  - Famous train engineer Casey Jones dies in a wreck in Vaughan, Mississippi, while saving all of the passengers on his train.
- May 1 – Scofield Mine disaster: An explosion of blasting powder in coal mine in Scofield, Utah kills at least 200.
- May 23 – Sergeant William Harvey Carney is awarded the Medal of Honor for his actions in the Second Battle of Fort Wagner (July 18, 1863). While he is the 21st African American recipient of the medal, the action for which he is honored pre-dates all other African American recipients.
- June 7 – American temperance activist Carrie Nation enters a saloon in Kiowa, Kansas, and destroys its stock of alcoholic beverages with rocks.
- June 30 – Hoboken Docks Fire: A wharf fire at the docks in Hoboken, New Jersey owned by the North German Lloyd Steamship line spreads to German passenger ships Saale, Main, and Bremen. The fire engulfs the adjacent piers and nearby ships, killing 326 people.

=== July–September ===
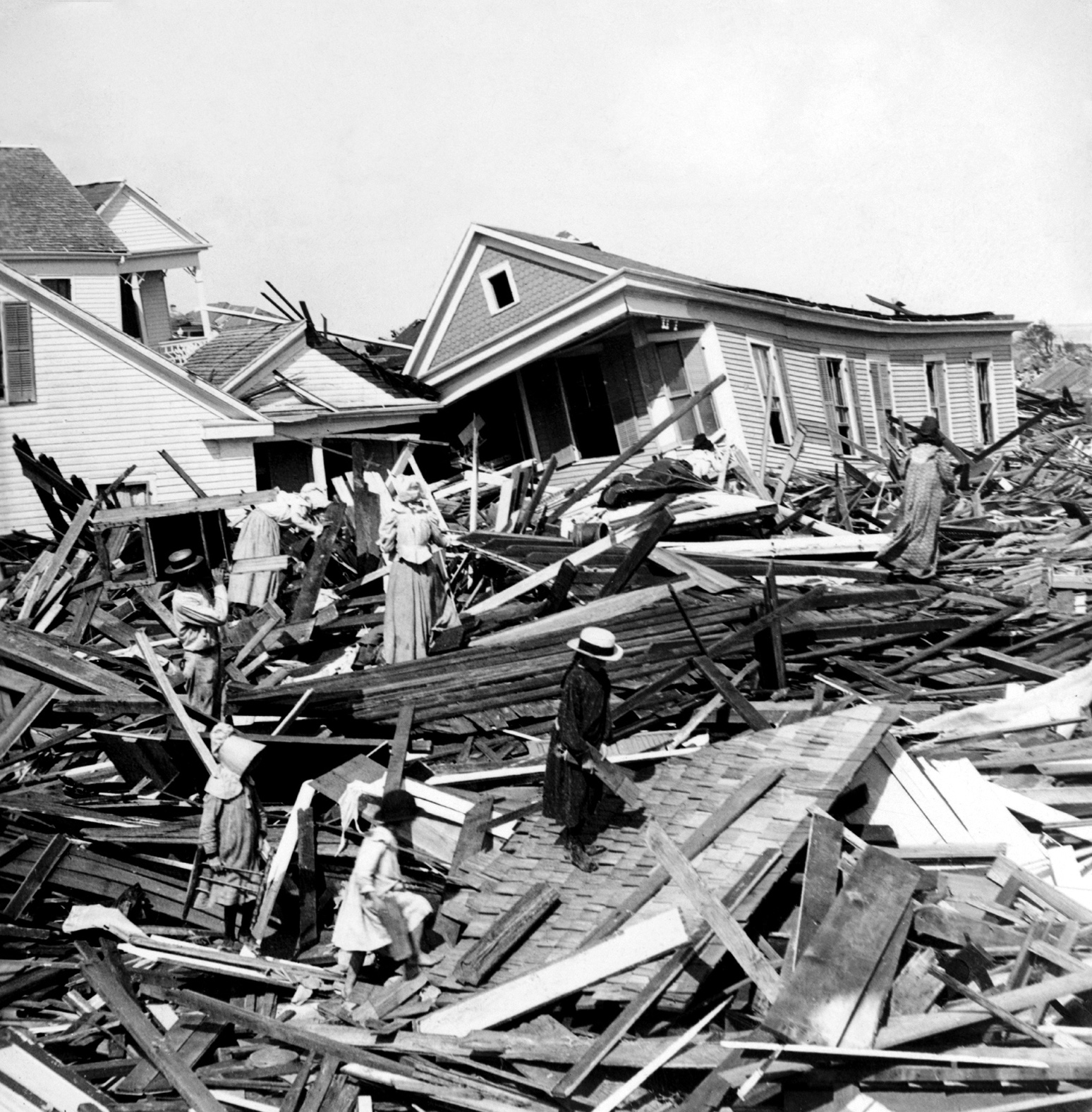
Galveston Hurricane

- July 25 – The Robert Charles Riots occur in New Orleans, Louisiana, United States.
- September 8 – The Galveston Hurricane makes landfall at Galveston, Texas, eventually killing 6,000–12,000 in the deadliest natural disaster in U.S. history.
- September 13 – Philippine–American War: Filipino resistance fighters defeat a large American column in the Battle of Pulang Lupa.
- September 17 – Philippine–American War: Filipinos under Juan Cailles defeat Americans under Colonel Benjamin F. Cheatham at Mabitac.

=== October–December ===
- c. October 3 – The Wright brothers begin their first manned glider experimental flights at Kitty Hawk, North Carolina.
- November 2 – William J. Samford is elected the 31st governor of Alabama defeating John Anthony Steele and Grattan B. Crowe.
- November 3 – The first automobile show in the United States opens at New York City's Madison Square Garden.
- November 6 – 1900 United States presidential election: Republican incumbent William McKinley is reelected by defeating Democratic challenger William Jennings Bryan on a record turnout of 73.7%.
- December 1
  - William D. Jelks becomes an acting governor of Alabama while William J. Samford is ill.
  - William J. Samford is sworn in as the 31st governor of Alabama replacing Joseph F. Johnston
- December 26 – William D. Jelks ends as an acting governor of Alabama.

=== Undated ===
- Milton S. Hershey introduces the milk chocolate Hershey bar.
- In New Haven, Connecticut, Louis Lassen of Louis' Lunch makes the first modern-day hamburger sandwich.
- At the Carnegie Steel Company, Slavs and Italians produce one-third of the world's total steel supply.
- The Tramp and the Crap Game silent film is released.

=== Ongoing ===
- Progressive Era (1890s–1920s)
- Lochner era (c. 1897–c. 1937)
- Philippine–American War (1899–1902)

== Births ==
- January 2 – William Haines, actor (died 1973)
- January 3 – C. L. Dellums, co-founder of the Brotherhood of Sleeping Car Porters (died 1989)
- January 4 – James Bond, ornithologist (died 1989)
- January 5 – George Magrill, film actor (died 1952)
- January 6 – John West Sinclair, silent film actor (died 1945)
- January 8 – Dorothy Adams, character actress (died 1988)
- January 9 – Richard Halliburton, adventurer, writer (died 1939)
- January 11
  - Borden Chase, writer (died 1971)
  - Lloyd French, film director (died 1950)
- January 15 – Rogers E. M. Whitaker, an editor at The New Yorker and railroad traveler (died 1981)
- January 27 – Hyman G. Rickover, admiral (died 1986)
- January 28 – Alice Neel, portrait painter (died 1984)
- January 31 – Betty Parsons, painter and gallerist (died 1982)
- February 5 – Adlai Stevenson II, politician (died 1965)
- February 12 – Roger J. Traynor, judge (died 1983)
- February 13 – Wingy Manone, jazz trumpeter and bandleader (died 1982)
- February 25 – Richard Hollingshead, inventor of the drive-in theatre (died 1975)
- March 3 – Ruby Dandridge, African American film and radio actress (died 1987)
- March 4 – Herbert Biberman, screenwriter, film director (died 1971)
- March 8 – Howard Aiken, computing pioneer (died 1973)
- March 10 – Olive Ann Alcorn, dancer, model and silent film actress (died 1972)
- March 29 – Oscar Elton Sette, fisheries scientist (died 1972)
- April 1 – William Benton, U.S. Senator from Connecticut from 1949 to 1953 (died 1973)
- April 5 – Spencer Tracy, film actor (died 1967)
- April 10 – Arnold Orville Beckman, chemist and investor (died 2004)
- April 13 – Sorcha Boru, born Claire Jones, art deco potter, ceramic sculptor (died 2006)
- April 19 – Rhea Silberta, Yiddish songwriter, singing teacher (died 1959)
- April 26 – Charles Francis Richter, geophysicist, inventor (died 1985)
- May 5 – Helen Redfield, geneticist (died 1988)
- May 11 – Thomas H. Robbins Jr., admiral (died 1972)
- May 12 – Joseph Rochefort, captain and cryptanalyst (died 1976)
- May 15 – Ida Rhodes, mathematician, pioneer in computer programming (died 1986)
- May 27 – Leopold Godowsky Jr., violinist and chemist, co-inventor of reversal film (died 1983)
- May 28
  - Tommy Ladnier, jazz trumpeter (died 1939)
  - Morris Talpalar, sociologist (died 1979)
- May 31 – Lucile Godbold, Olympic athlete (died 1981)
- June 3 – Adelaide Ames, astronomer (died 1932)
- June 4
  - Louella Ballerino, fashion designer (died 1978)
  - George Watkins, baseball player (died 1970)
- June 7
  - Glen Gray, jazz saxophonist (died 1963)
  - Frederick Terman, electrical engineer, professor (died 1982)
- June 8 – Lena Baker, African American maid executed for capital murder, pardoned posthumously (died 1945)
- June 14
  - Ruth Nanda Anshen, writer, editor and philosopher (died 2003)
  - June Walker, actress (died 1966)
- June 15 – Paul Mares, jazz trumpeter (died 1949)
- June 19 – Laura Z. Hobson, author (died 1986)
- June 22 – Russell Vis, wrestler (died 1990)
- June 23 – Blanche Noyes, aviator (died 1981)
- June 24 – Gene Austin, crooner (died 1972)
- June 25 – Georgia Hale, silent film actress and real estate investor (died 1985)
- July 2 – Joe Bennett, baseball player (died 1987)
- July 3 – Gordon MacQuarrie, author and journalist (died 1956)
- July 4 – Nellie Mae Rowe, African American folk artist (died 1982)
- July 5
  - Reed Howes, model and film actor (died 1964)
  - Richard K. Webel, landscape architect (died 2000)
- July 6 – Frederica Sagor Maas, playwright, essayist and author (died 2012 viveu pra caralho)
- July 7
  - Frank W. Cyr, educator, author (died 1995)
  - Earle E. Partridge, general (died 1990)
- July 8 – George Antheil, avant-garde composer (died 1959)
- July 9
  - Joseph LaShelle, cinematographer (died 1989)
  - Frances McConnell-Mills, toxicologist (died 1975)
- July 13
  - Cornelius Keefe, film actor (died 1972)
  - George Lewis, jazz clarinetist (died 1968)
- July 20 – Hunter Lane, baseball player (died 1994)
- July 21 – Isadora Bennett, theatre manager, modern dance publicity agent (died 1980)
- July 22 – Edward Dahlberg, novelist and poet (died 1977)
- July 23 – Julia Davis Adams, author, journalist (died 1993)
- July 29 – Owen Lattimore, scholar of Asia (died 1989)
- August 3 – Ernie Pyle, journalist (died 1945)
- August 9 – Charles Farrell, screen actor (died 1990)
- August 11 – Philip Phillips, archaeologist (died 1994)
- August 15 – Estelle Brody, silent film actress (died 1995)
- August 17 – Quincy Howe, journalist (died 1977)
- August 18 – Glenn Albert Black, archaeologist (died 1964)
- August 19
  - Colleen Moore, film actress (died 1988)
  - Dorothy Burr Thompson, archaeologist, art historian (died 2001)
- August 26 – Margaret Utinsky, nurse, recipient of the Medal of Freedom (died 1970)
- September 5 – Grace Eldering, public health scientist, co-developer of vaccine for whooping cough (died 1988)
- September 8
  - Thomas Darden, rear admiral, 37th Governor of American Samoa (died 1961)
  - Claude Pepper, U.S. Senator from Florida from 1936 to 1951 (died 1989)
- September 12 – Martha Atwell, radio director (died 1949)
- September 17
  - J. Willard Marriott, entrepreneur, founder of the Marriott International hospitality chain (died 1985)
  - Lena Frances Edwards, African American physician, recipient of the Presidential Medal of Freedom (died 1986)
- September 18 – Thomas Darden, rear admiral, 37th Governor of American Samoa (died 1961)
- September 22 – Paul Hugh Emmett, chemical engineer (died 1985)
- September 28 – Isabel Pell, socialite, member of the French Resistance during WWII (died 1951)
- October 6 – Vivion Brewer, desegregationist (died 1991)
- October 9 – Frederick Moosbrugger, admiral (died 1974)
- October 10 – Helen Hayes, actress (died 1993)
- October 17 – Jean Arthur, comic film actress (died 1991)
- October 18 – Evelyn Berckman, novelist (died 1978)
- November 5
  - Martin Dies Jr., politician (died 1972)
  - Natalie Schafer, actress (died 1991)
- November 6
  - Ida Lou Anderson, orator, professor and radio broadcasting pioneer (died 1941)
  - Hugh Prosser, film actor (died 1952)
- November 8
  - Margaret Mitchell, novelist (Gone With The Wind) (died 1949)
  - Charley Paddock, Olympic sprinter (died 1943)
- November 11 – Frederick Lawton, 9th Director of the Office of Management and Budget (died 1975)
- November 13 – David Marshall Williams, inventor (died 1975)
- November 14 – Aaron Copland, composer (died 1990)
- November 20 – Florieda Batson, hurdler (died 1996)
- November 29 – Mildred Gillars ("Axis Sally"), Nazi propaganda broadcaster (died 1988)
- December 6 – Agnes Moorehead, actress (Bewitched) (died 1974)
- December 12 – Sammy Davis Sr., dancer (died 1988)
- December 19 – Margaret Brundage, illustrator (died 1976)
- December 23 – Merle Barwis, American-Canadian supercentenarian (died 2014)
- Undated
  - Hattie Moseley Austin, African American entrepreneur, restaurateur (died 1998)
  - Grace Morley, art museum curator (died 1985)
  - Fannie Nampeyo, Hopi potter and ceramic artist (died 1987)
  - Virginia Frances Sterrett, artist, illustrator (died 1931)

== Deaths ==
- January 2 – Zenas Bliss, Union Army general and Medal of Honor recipient (born 1835)
- January 22 – David Edward Hughes, inventor of the microphone and teleprinter (born 1831)
- February 18 – Clinton L. Merriam, banker and politician (born 1824)
- February 20 – Washakie, head chief of the Eastern Snakes (born c.1798/1810)
- February 22 – Dan Rice, clown (born 1823)
- March 19 – John Bingham, politician and lawyer (born 1815)
- April 7 – Frederic Edwin Church, landscape painter (born 1826)
- April 22 – Ruth Cox Adams, abolitionist (born 1818)
- April 24 – Andrew Smith Hallidie, inventor and cable car pioneer (born 1836)
- April 30 – Casey Jones, legendary train engineer (born 1863)
- May 22 – Nathaniel P. Hill, U.S. Senator from Colorado from 1879 to 1885 (born 1832)
- June 11 – Maria Isabella Boyd, U.S. Civil War spy for the Confederacy (born 1844)
- June 12 – Lucretia Peabody Hale, journalist and author (born 1820)
- July 14 – John H. Gear, U.S. Senator from Iowa from 1895 to 1900 (born 1825)
- August 2 – John Mason Loomis, lumber tycoon, Union militia colonel in the American Civil War and philanthropist (born 1825)
- August 5 – Luke Pryor, U.S. Senator from Alabama in 1880 (born 1820)
- August 12 – James Edward Keeler, astronomer (born 1857)
- August 13 – Collis P. Huntington, railroad promoter (born 1821)
- August 16 – John James Ingalls, U.S. Senator from Kansas from 1873 to 1891 (born 1833)
- September 20 – John Alexander McClernand, lawyer, politician, and Union General during the American Civil War (born 1812)
- September 23 – William Marsh Rice, philanthropist and founder of Rice University (born 1816)
- September 25 – John M. Palmer, U.S. Senator from Illinois from 1891 to 1897 (born 1817)
- September 29 – Samuel Fenton Cary, Congressman and prohibitionist (born 1814)
- October 20 – Charles Dudley Warner, essayist and novelist (born 1829)
- October 22 – John Sherman, 32nd United States Secretary of the Treasury, 35th United States Secretary of State (born 1823)
- November 27 – Cushman Kellogg Davis, Governor of Minnesota from 1874 to 1876 and U.S. Senator from Minnesota from 1887 to 1900 (born 1838)
- December 21 – Roger Wolcott, lawyer and politician, 39th Governor of Massachusetts (born 1847)
- December 31 – J.T. Wamelink, Dutch-born composer (born 1827)

== See also ==
- List of American films of 1900
- Timeline of United States history (1900–1929)
