= 1902 United States House of Representatives elections in Alabama =

- November 4, 1902

All 9 Alabama seats to the United States House of Representatives
	Majority party	Minority party
Party	Democratic	Republican
Last election	9	0
Seats won	9	0
Seat change	Steady	Steady
Popular vote	68,074	22,443
Percentage	74.41%	25.12%

Democratic
50–60%
60–70%
70–80%
80–90%
90–100%
Republican
50–60%

The 1902 United States House of Representatives elections in Alabama were held on November 4, 1902, to elect the nine U.S. representatives from the state of Alabama, one from each of the state's nine congressional districts. Democratic primary elections were held on August 25, 1902. This was the first congressional election held in Alabama after the ratification of the 1901 Alabama Constitution. A fully Democratic delegation was elected to the House of Representatives.

The elections coincided with elections for governor, state senate, state house, and numerous other state and local offices.

== Summary ==
Party	Candidates			Seats		
Party	Num.	Vote	%	Before	Won	+/–
Democratic	9	68,074	74.41%	9	9	Steady
Republican	11	22,978	25.12%	0	0	Steady
Republican alone	10	14,934	16.32%	0	0	Steady
Rep.–Pop. fusion	1	8,044	8.79%	0	0	Steady
Independents	1	239	0.26%	0	0	Steady
Socialist	1	195	0.21%	0	0	Steady
Write-in		4	0.004%	—	0	Steady
Total	22	91,490	100%	9		Steady

== General election results ==
District	Democrats			Republicans			Others			Total		
District	Candidate	Votes	%	Candidate	Votes	%	Candidate	Votes	%	Votes	Maj.	Mrg.
1st	George W. Taylor (inc.)	5,364	89.79%	E. H. Hubbard; George H. Wilkerson	545; 65	9.12% 1.09%	—	—	—	5,974	+610	+10.21%
2nd	Ariosto A. Wiley (inc.)	7,696	89.94%	Julius Sternfeld	861	10.06%	—	—	—	8,557	+6,835	+79.88%
3rd	Henry D. Clayton Jr. (inc.)	7,595	84.06%	Moses W. Carden; J. P. Pelham	905; 535	10.02% 5.92%	—	—	—	9,035	+6,690	+74.05%
4th	Sydney J. Bowie (inc.)	6,880	69.30%	J. A. Edwards	3,048	30.70%	—	—	—	9,928	+3,832	+38.60%
5th	C. W. Thompson (inc.)	9,043	78.37%	Richard S. Nolen	2,495	21.62%	Willis Brewer (WI)	1	0.01%	11,539	+6,548	+56.75%
6th	John H. Bankhead (inc.)	7,481	72.76%	William B. Ford	2,798	27.21%	P. L. Croker (WI)	3	0.03%	10,282	+4,683	+45.55%
7th	John L. Burnett (inc.)	9,298	52.89%	O. D. Street (Rep-Pop.)	8,044	45.75%	W. T. L. Cofer (Ind.)	239	1.36%	17,581	+1,254	+7.13%
8th	William Richardson (inc.)	7,935	80.77%	James Jackson	1,889	19.23%	—	—	—	9,824	+6,046	+61.54%
9th	Oscar W. Underwood (inc.)	6,782	77.33%	J. Clyde Miller	1,793	20.44%	Fred Lemon (Soc.)	195	2.22%	8,770	+4,989	+56.89%
Source: Alabama Official and Statistical Register, 1903 (p. 239–241), The Birmingham News

== Democratic primary results ==
Democratic primary elections were held on August 25, 1902. Former congressman Willis Brewer contested incumbent representative C. W. Thompson for the 5th district's Democratic nomination. Thompson won every county in the district with the exception of Lowndes, Brewer's home county. Every other Democratic nominee went unopposed.

5th district election, Democratic primary
Party	Candidate	Votes	%
Democratic	C. W. Thompson	7,965	67.37%
Democratic	Willis Brewer	3,857	32.63%
Total votes		11,822	100.00%
