= 1902 Alabama Senate election =

- November 4, 1902

18 of 35 seats in the Alabama State Senate (even-numbered and 35th districts) 18 seats needed for a majority
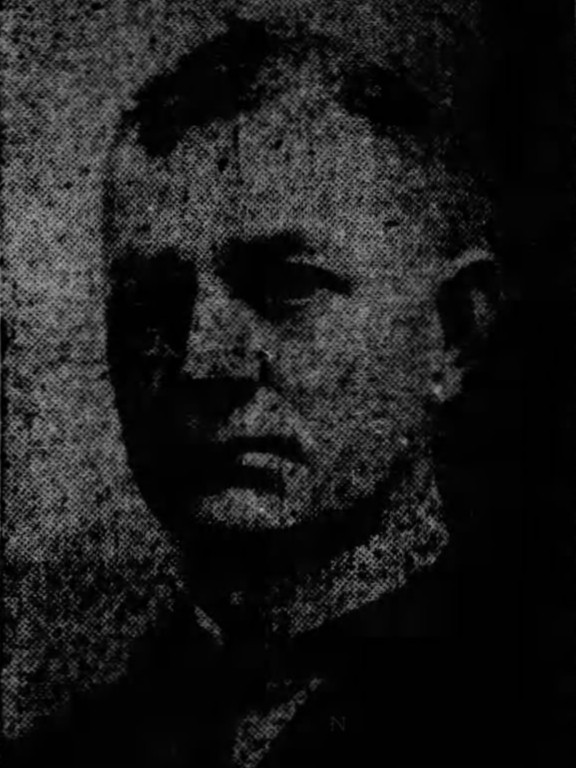

	Majority party	Minority party	Third party
Leader	D. J. Meador (did not stand)	James A. Hurst (de facto)	—
Party	Democratic	Populist	Republican
Leader since	December 3, 1900	—	—
Leader's seat	20th–Marengo Co.	—	—
Popular vote	28,666	4,071	6,086
Percentage	82.09%	11.66%	17.43%
Seats before	32	1	0
Seats up	17	1	0
Seats won	17	1	0
Seats after	34	1	0
Seat change	▲2	Steady	Steady
- Democratic hold Populist hold
President pro tempore before election
D. J. Meador
Democratic
Elected President pro tempore
Joel W. Goldsby
Democratic

The 1902 Alabama Senate election took place on Tuesday, November 4, 1902, to elect 18 of the chamber's 35 representatives to serve four-year terms in the Alabama Senate. This was the first state senate election held in Alabama after the ratification of the 1901 Alabama Constitution. The constitution increased the size of the state senate from 33 members to 35, creating a new 34th and 35th district. After the establishment of Houston County and its placement in the 35th district in 1903, these districts would remain intact until the 1962 election, when federal courts mandated new districts be drawn.

As a result of the 1900 election, there was only one non-Democrat in the Senate, holdover Populist senator James A. Hurst of District 6. Hurst was re-elected on a Republican-Populist fusion ticket, remaining the only non-Democrat in the Senate. Joel W. Goldsby of Mobile County was unanimously elected President pro tempore of the Senate when the legislature convened.

District map of the Alabama Senate before (left) and after (right) the ratification of the 1901 Constitution. Districts in gray did not have their boundaries changed.

== Summary ==
Party	Candidates			Seats				
Party	Num.	Vote	%	Before	Up	Won	After	+/–
Democratic	18	28,666	82.09%	32	17	17	34	▲2
Populist	3	4,071	11.66%	1	1	1	1	Steady
Republican	2	6,086	17.43%	0	0	0	0	Steady
Total	23	34,919	100%	33		35		▲2

=== By district ===
District	Democrats			Populists and Republicans			Total		
District	Candidate	Votes	%	Candidate	Votes	%	Votes	Maj.	Mrg.
6th	Marcus M. Smith	1,981	48.77%	James A. Hurst (Pop-Rep.)	2,081	51.23%	4,062	−100	−2.46%
8th	William B. Castleberry	1,475	86.16%	Graves Embry (Rep.)	237	13.84%	1,712	+1,238	+72.31%
12th	Christopher C. Nesmith	2,697	58.10%	H. P. Gaines (Rep.)	1,945	41.90%	4,642	+752	+16.20%
34th	Walter Scott Smith	2,720	59.87%	W. J. Campbell (Pop-Rep.)	1,823	40.13%	4,543	+897	+19.74%
35th	William Oates Long	1,365	89.10%	John W. Smith (Pop.)	167	10.90%	1,532	+1,198	+78.20%
Source: Alabama Official and Statistical Register, 1903 (p. 243–244)

In January 1903, M. M. Smith, the Democratic nominee in Senate District 6, contested the election of Populist James A. Hurst, alleging voter irregularities. Hurst remained seated.

== See also ==
- 1902 elections in Alabama
  - 1902 United States House of Representatives elections in Alabama
  - 1902 Alabama gubernatorial election
  - 1902 Alabama House of Representatives election
- 1902 United States elections
