= 1902 Alabama elections =

General elections in the state of Alabama

- November 4, 1902

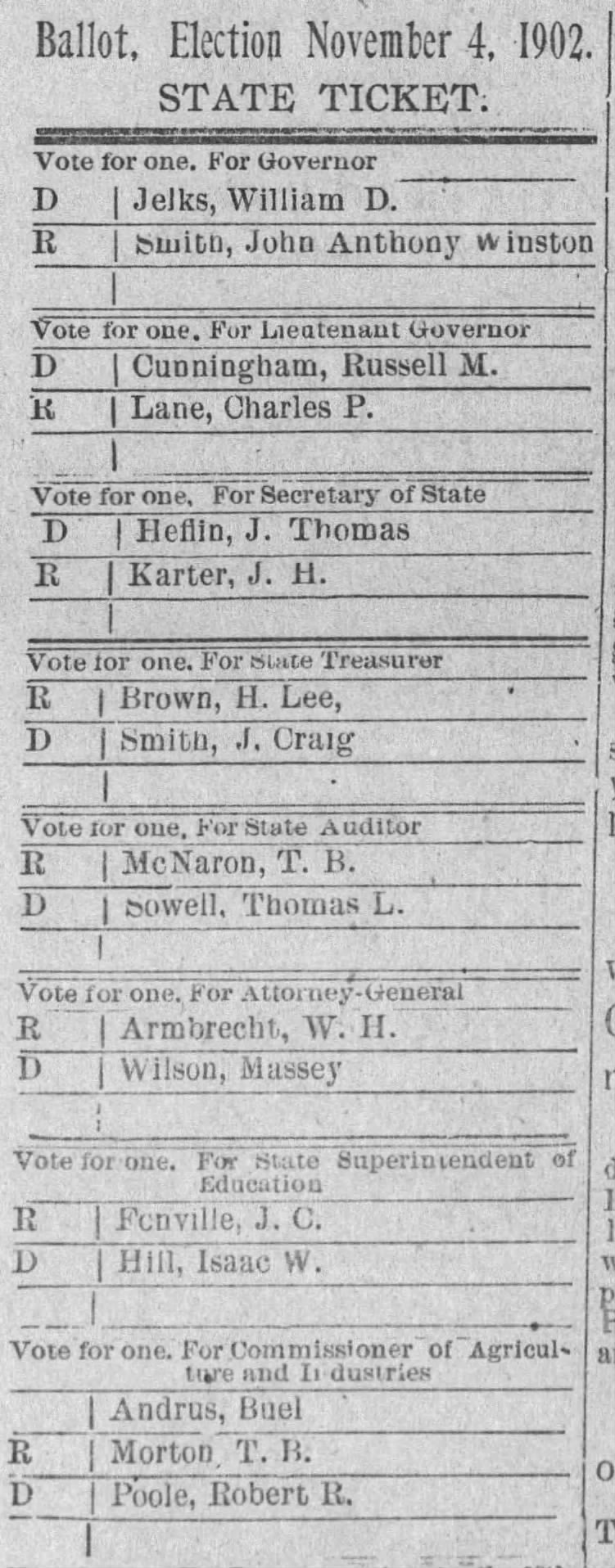
Sample ballot of the 1902 general election in Alabama

A general election was held in the U.S. State of Alabama on November 4, 1902, to elect candidates to various federal, state, and local offices. This was the first general election held in Alabama after the ratification of the 1901 Alabama Constitution. Democratic primary elections were held on August 25.

Statewide elections were contested by the Republican Party and the Democratic Party. The Socialist Party put up a last-minute nominee for the Commissioner of Agriculture. The Prohibition Party unsuccessfully petitioned to get on the ballot, and ran write-in campaigns. Populist candidates were put up and elected to the state legislature.

== State offices ==
=== Governor ===
William D. Jelks was elected.

1902 Alabama gubernatorial election
Party	Candidate	Votes	%
Democratic	William D. Jelks (incumbent)	67,649	73.64%
Republican	John A. W. Smith	24,190	26.33%
Prohibition (write-in)	William D. Gay	23	0.03%
Write-in	Ad Wimbs	1	0.00%
Total votes		91,863	100.00%
Democratic hold			

=== Lieutenant governor ===
Russell McWhortor Cunningham was elected.

1902 Alabama lieutenant gubernatorial election
Party	Candidate	Votes	%
Democratic	Russell McWhortor Cunningham	65,804	74.53%
Republican	Charles P. Lane	22,479	25.46%
Prohibition (write-in)	C. J. Hammett	11	0.01%
Total votes		88,294	100.00%
Democratic hold			

=== Attorney General ===
Massey Wilson was elected.

1902 Alabama Attorney General election
Party	Candidate	Votes	%
Democratic	Massey Wilson	65,341	75.28%
Republican	W. H. Ambrecht	21,446	24.71%
Prohibition (write-in)	H. H. Blackman	10	0.01%
Total votes		86,797	100.00%
Democratic hold			

=== Secretary of State ===
J. Thomas Heflin was elected.

1902 Alabama Secretary of State election
Party	Candidate	Votes	%
Democratic	J. Thomas Heflin	65,771	74.72%
Republican	W. H. Ambrecht	22,248	25.27%
Prohibition (write-in)	W. D. Witherspoon	10	0.01%
Total votes		88,029	100.00%
Democratic hold			

=== State Treasurer ===
J. Craig Smith was elected.

1902 Alabama State Treasurer election
Party	Candidate	Votes	%
Democratic	J. Craig Smith	65,207	74.61%
Republican	H. Lee Brown	22,176	25.38%
Prohibition (write-in)	R. O. Simpson	9	0.01%
Total votes		87,392	100.00%
Democratic hold			

=== State Auditor ===
Thomas L. Sowell was elected.

1902 Alabama State Auditor election
Party	Candidate	Votes	%
Democratic	Thomas L. Sowell	64,686	74.81%
Republican	T. B. McNaron	21,769	25.18%
Prohibition (write-in)	J. D. Albritton	12	0.01%
Total votes		86,467	100.00%
Democratic hold			

=== Commissioner of Agriculture ===
Robert R. Poole was elected.

1902 Alabama Commissioner of Agriculture election
Party	Candidate	Votes	%
Democratic	Robert R. Poole	63,442	73.86%
Republican	T. B. Morton	20,133	23.44%
Socialist	Buel Andrus	2,312	2.69%
Prohibition (write-in)	C. D. Alverson	11	0.01%
Total votes		85,898	100.00%
Democratic hold			

=== Superintendent of Education ===
Isaac W. Hill was elected.

1902 Alabama Superintendent of Education election
Party	Candidate	Votes	%
Democratic	Isaac W. Hill	64,891	74.36%
Republican	J. C. Fonville	22,310	25.57%
Socialist (write-in)	Buel Andrus	54	0.06%
Prohibition (write-in)	O. E. Comstock	11	0.01%
Prohibition (write-in)	C. J. Hammett	1	0.00%
Total votes		87,267	100.00%
Democratic hold			

=== Alabama Legislature ===
==== Senate ====
The Alabama Democratic Party retained control of the Alabama Senate.

==== House of Representatives ====
The Alabama Democratic Party retained control of the Alabama House of Representatives.
