= SS Saale =

Passenger ship (1886–1924)

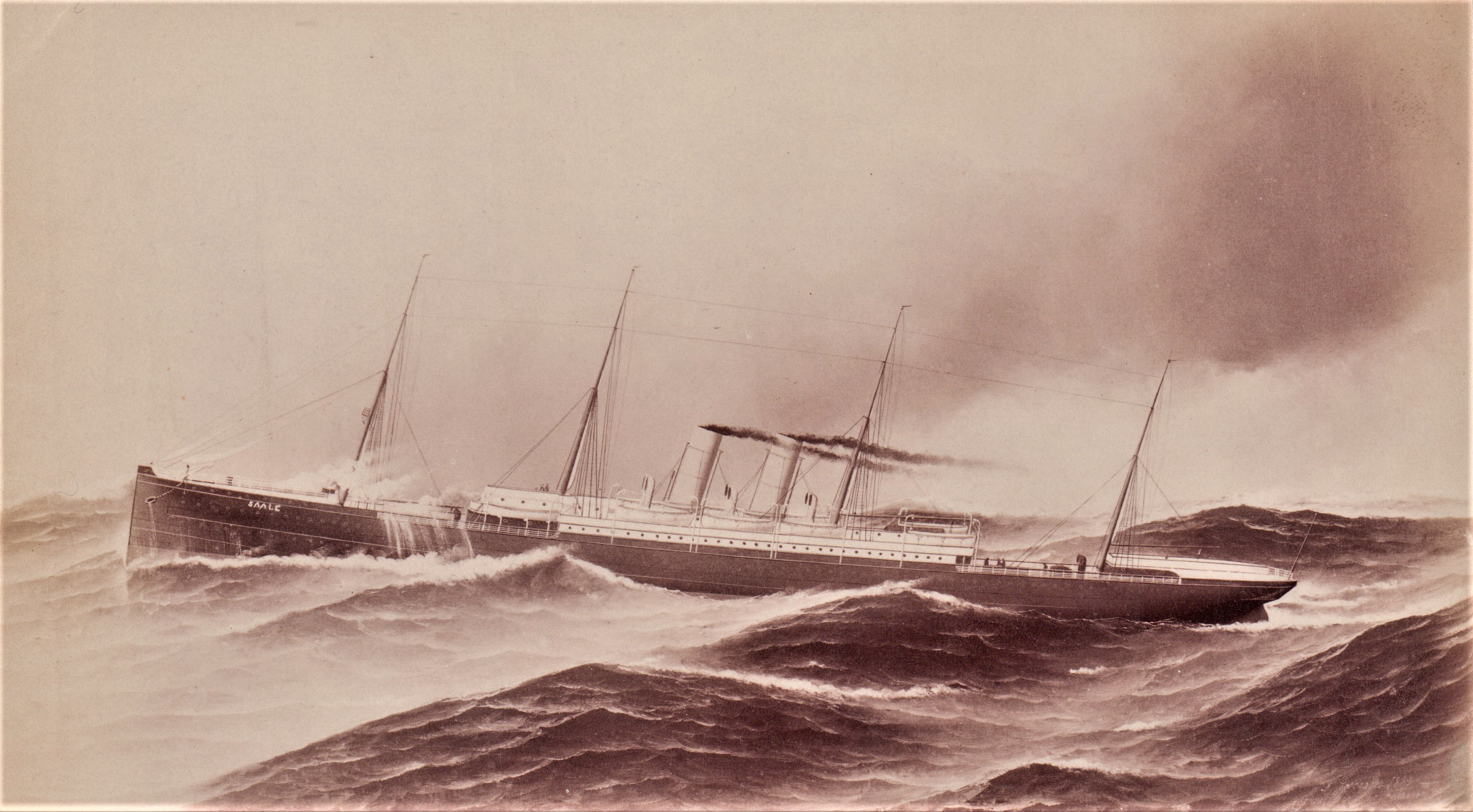
- Albumen Photograph 1895 - SS Saale W. Sander & Sohn Photographen Geestemunde

History
- Name: Saale (1886–1901); J. L. Luckenbach (1901–22); Princess (1922–23); Madison (1923–24)
- Owner: Norddeutscher Lloyd (1886–1901); Lukenbach Transportation & Wrecking Co (1901–19); Lukenbach Steamship Co Inc (1919–22); Archibale M. Ostrom (1922–24)
- Port of registry: Bremen, Germany (1886–1901); New York, United States (1901–22)
- Route: Germany – United States (1886–1900)
- Builder: Fairfield Engineering and Shipbuilding Co Ltd
- Launched: 21 April 1886
- Maiden voyage: 18 August 1886
- Out of service: 1900–01
- Fate: Scrapped 1924

General characteristics
- Type: Ocean liner (1886–1900); Cargo ship (1901–24)
- Tonnage: 4,967 GRT
- Length: 439 feet 6 inches (133.96 m)
- Beam: 48 feet 1 inch (14.66 m)
- Propulsion: Steam engine, single screw propeller
- Speed: 17 knots (31 km/h)
- Capacity: 150 1st class, 90 2nd class, 1,000 steerage class (1886–1900)

SS Saale was an ocean liner for North German Lloyd in the late 19th century, which was severely damaged in the 1900 Hoboken Docks Fire. On 30 June 1900, Saale was moored at the North German Lloyd piers in Hoboken, New Jersey, preparing to depart on a transatlantic crossing when some cotton on a nearby pier caught on fire and spread to the ship. Saale and several other ships were soon engulfed in flames; 99 passengers and crew on Saale were killed in the fire and subsequent sinking.

The ship was raised, sold, rebuilt, re-engined, and renamed SS J. L. Luckenbach in 1901–02. The ship served as a cargo ship for the Luckenbach Line. In October 1917, during World War I, the Luckenbach came under attack by German submarine U-62, which damaged the ship and set her cargo of cotton on fire. but the ship was able to eventually make port in France. The ship was renamed SS Princess in 1922 and SS Madison in 1923. She was broken up at Genoa in June 1924.

== Description ==
The ship was 439 feet 6 inches (133.96 m) long, with a beam of 48 feet 1 inch (14.66 m). She was assessed as 4,967 GRT. She was powered by a steam engine driving a single propeller. This could propel her at 17 knots (31 km/h).

== North German Lloyd career ==
Saale was a German passenger ship owned by the North German Lloyd company of Bremen, and was built by the Fairfield shipbuilding company in Glasgow in 1886. She was launched on 21 April 1886 and made her maiden voyage on 18 August 1886. She was capable of carrying 1,240 passengers: 150 in first class, 90 in second class, and up to a thousand in steerage. Saale primarily sailed the express route between Bremen, Southampton and New York.

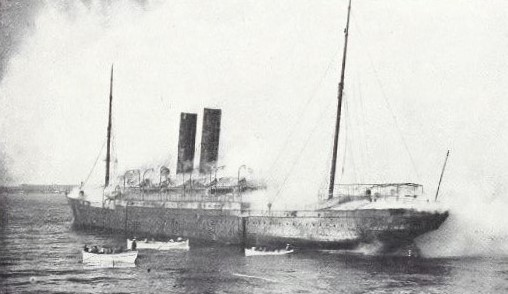
Saale on fire, 30 June 1900

On the afternoon of 30 June 1900, Saale, along with her line mates Kaiser Wilhelm der Grosse, Main, and Bremen, were moored alongside piers 1, 2 and 3 in Hoboken, New Jersey. Saale had passengers on board readying to depart for Southampton. While the ship remained alongside her pier, some cotton that was on the pier caught fire, and due to a strong wind the flames blew over to some barrels of oil and turpentine, which quickly went ablaze. The wind fanned the flames along the pier and over to the ships. Kaiser Wilhelm der Grosse quickly managed to get up some steam and get away, but there was no such luck for the other ships which moved away ablaze. Passengers above decks on Saale were able to jump into the Hudson River and swim to safety. Many others who were in cabins were trapped, and prevented from exiting the ship because the portholes were not big enough for a person to get through, so many were suffocated or incinerated. Saale eventually sank, and when she was raised the charred remains of 99 victims were recovered.

As a result of this disaster it was legislated that portholes had to be big enough for a person of reasonable size to escape.

== Later career ==
The ship was sold to Luckenbach Transportation and Wrecking Co, New York, United States. She was rebuilt, and re-engined as a cargo ship of American registry under the name SS J. L. Luckenbach in 1901–02. On 19 October 1917, during World War I, J. L. Luckenbach was under fire from German submarine U-62 for three hours, and her cargo of cotton set on fire. The American destroyer USS Nicholson arrived on the scene and drove off the attacking U-boat, helped to extinguish the fire, and make repairs to the boat. When the convoy Nicholson had been escorting caught up with the pair of vessels, the Luckenbach joined the convoy and made it safely to Le Havre on 21 October. In 1919, the name of her owners changed to Luckenbach Steamship Co Inc.

The ship was sold to Archibald M. Ostrom of New York in 1922 and was renamed Princess. She was renamed Madison in 1923. She was broken up at Genoa in June 1924.
