= SS Bremen (1896) =

1897 Barbarossa-class ocean liner

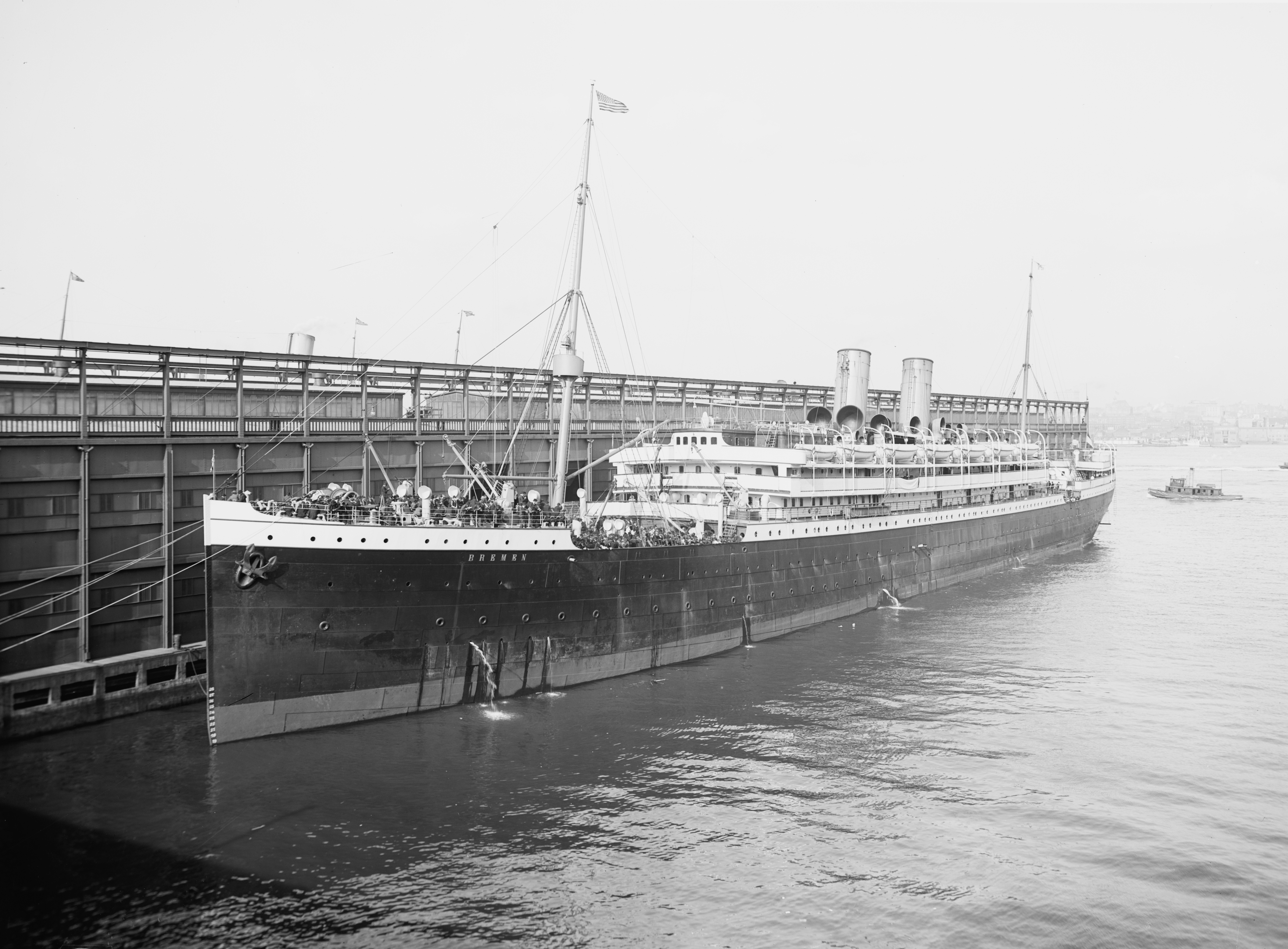
- SS Bremen in 1905

History

German Empire
- Name: Bremen
- Namesake: Bremen
- Owner: North German Lloyd
- Port of registry: Bremen
- Builder: F. Schichau, Danzig, Germany
- Yard number: 583
- Launched: 14 November 1896
- Fate: Handed to Great Britain as war reparations 4 April 1919

United Kingdom
- Name: Bremen
- Owner: British Shipping Controller 1919, Byron SN Co., London 1921
- Operator: P&O line 1919, Byron SN Co., London 1921
- Acquired: 1919
- Renamed: Constantinople 1921, King Alexander 1924
- Fate: Broken up Italy 1929

General characteristics
- Class & type: Barbarossa-class ocean liner
- Tonnage: 10,525 GRT
- Length: 550 ft (170 m)
- Beam: 60.2 ft (18.3 m)
- Draft: 34 ft (10 m)
- Propulsion: 2 × quadruple-expansion steam engines, 8,000 hp (6,000 kW); twin screw propellers
- Speed: 15.5 knots (28.7 km/h; 17.8 mph)
- Capacity: 230 First Class; 250 Second Class; 1,850 steerage
- Complement: 250 crew

SS Bremen, later renamed Constantinople and then King Alexander, was a German Barbarossa-class ocean liner that entered service in 1897 with Norddeutscher Lloyd.

== History ==
The Bremen was built by F. Schichau of Danzig for the Norddeutscher-Lloyd line (NDL). She started her maiden voyage on 5 June 1897, traveling from Bremen to New York with a stopover at Southampton. In addition to the transatlantic run she also sailed from Bremen to Australia via the Suez Canal.

On 30 June 1900, she was badly damaged in a dockside fire at the NDL pier in Hoboken, New Jersey. The fire started in a bale of cotton. The Lloyd ships Kaiser Wilhelm der Grosse, Saale and Main were also damaged in the fire, with the Saale sinking, whilst the Bremen ran aground. After the fire, Bremen was rebuilt by AG Vulcan Stettin, lengthened to 575 feet (175 m), and her tonnage was increased to 11,540 gross register tons (GRT). She reentered service in October 1901.

On 20 April 1912, while sailing from Bremen to New York City, Bremen passed through the debris field left by the sinking of RMS Titanic. A Bohemian passenger named Stephen Rehorek photographed an iceberg that matched eyewitness descriptions and sketches that had been given about the iceberg that Titanic struck. In addition, passengers and crew reported seeing hundreds of bodies floating in the water as well as many deck chairs and pieces of wood. Since there was already a ship specially chartered by White Star line to retrieve any bodies, the Bremen did not stop to recover any.

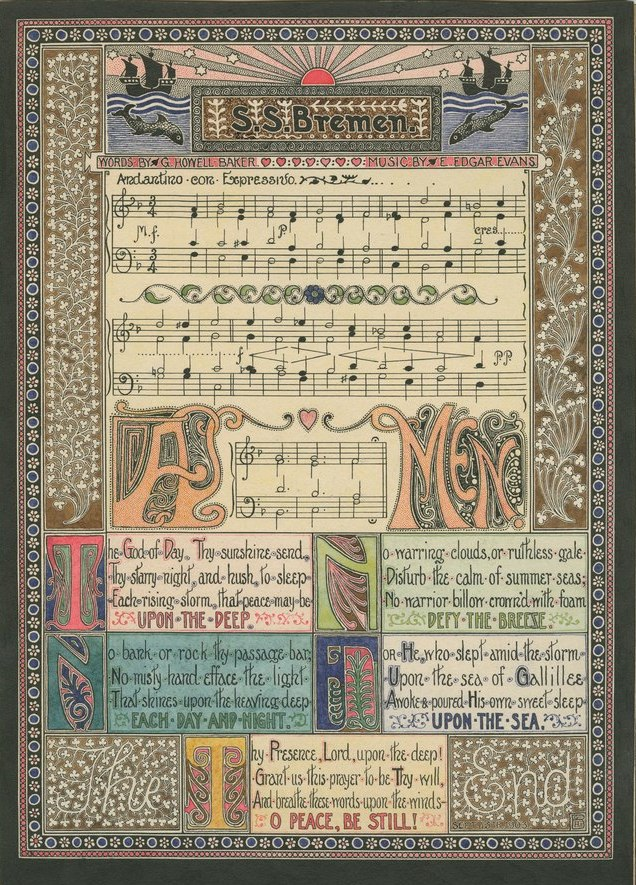
"S.S. Bremen" hymn with G. Howell-Baker and music by E. Edgar Evans

Bremen was laid up during World War I. After the war she was given to the British P&O line as part of the war reparations. Two years later she was sold to the Byron S.S. Co. and renamed Constantinople, and operated on the Piraeus-New York City route. By 1924, she was renamed King Alexander. She was scrapped in 1929.
