= Rhea Silberta =

American Yiddish composer

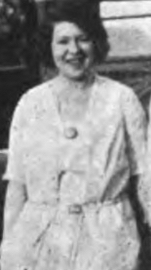
Rhea Silberta, from a 1921 publication.

Rhea Silberstein (Pocahontas, Virginia, April 19, 1900 - New York City, 1959), known professionally as Rhea Silberta, was a Yiddish song composer and teacher of singing.

Silberta's best known songs were written with her father and teacher Herman Silberstein. Her best known song "Yohrzeit" (Herman B. Silbershtein) was recorded by Sophie Braslau (Victrola 74595) in 1919 and Yossele Rosenblatt (Victrola 9011-A) in 1926. The song "Yom Kippur" was recorded by Dorothy Jardon (Brunswick 20037-B) in 1922, and "Beloved" by Rosa Ponselle. She gave a series of public lectures on music at the Plaza Hotel in 1928.
