= 1902 Alabama gubernatorial election =

- November 2, 1902
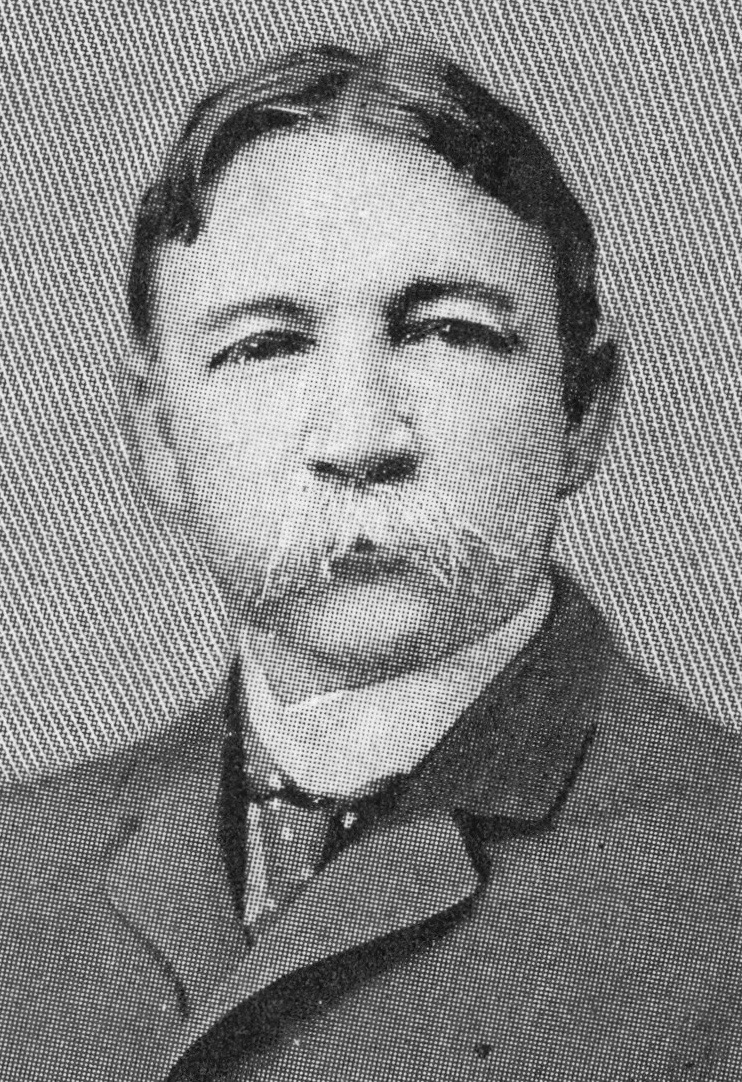

Nominee	William D. Jelks	John A. W. Smith
Party	Democratic	Republican
Popular vote	67,649	24,190
Percentage	73.64%	26.33%
- County results Jelks: 50–60% 60–70% 70–80% 80–90% >90% Smith: 50–60%
Governor before election
William D. Jelks
Democratic
Elected Governor
William D. Jelks
Democratic

The 1902 Alabama gubernatorial election took place on November 2, 1902, in order to elect the governor of Alabama. It was the first Alabama gubernatorial election in which the governor was elected for a four-year term; prior to 1902 the governor was elected to a two-year term. Incumbent Democrat William D. Jelks was running for election to his first full term; he had succeeded William J. Samford upon Samford's death a year prior. His Republican opponent, John A. W. Smith, was the son of former Alabama governor William Hugh Smith.

== Results ==
1902 Alabama gubernatorial election
Party	Candidate	Votes	%
Democratic	William D. Jelks (incumbent)	67,649	73.64%
Republican	John A. W. Smith	24,190	26.33%
Prohibition (write-in)	William D. Gay	23	0.03%
Write-in	Ad Wimbs	1	0.00%
Total votes		91,863	100.00%
Democratic hold			
