= Richard Hollingshead =

Inventor of the drive-in theater

Richard Milton Hollingshead, Jr.
- Born: February 25, 1900; Riverton, Burlington, New Jersey, United States
- Died: May 13, 1975 (aged 75); Villanova, Pennsylvania, United States
- Occupation: Entrepreneur
- Known for: Invention of the drive-in theater
- Spouse: Elsa Hermine Collins
- Parent(s): Richard Hollingshead, Emma Lovett

Richard Milton Hollingshead, Jr. (February 25, 1900 – May 13, 1975) was the inventor of the drive-in theater. Created in the early 1930s, Hollingshead's drive-in theater was first presented at Admiral Wilson Boulevard in Pennsauken, New Jersey.

== Early life ==
Richard Milton Hollingshead, Jr. was born in Riverton, New Jersey, to Richard Milton Hollingshead, Sr. (b. May 4, 1869, in Millville, New Jersey) and Emma Lovett on February 25, 1900. He was one of three children. His grandfather was Richard Spencer Hollingshead, born c. 1843 in Ohio and later moved to New Jersey becoming a clothing merchant.

== Invention of the drive-in ==
In the early 1930s, he was working as a general sales manager in his father's automotive chemical company, Whiz Auto Products. According to one story, his mother was a large woman who was uncomfortable sitting in a regular movie theater. So he began experimenting at his home in Camden, New Jersey, using his car, a 1928 Kodak movie projector, and two sheets nailed between two trees for a screen. Eventually, he came up with a ramp in each parking space, so that patrons could elevate the front of their cars to see the screen without being blocked by other vehicles. He applied for a patent on August 6, 1932 and was granted number 1,909,537 on May 16, 1933.

My invention relates to a new and useful outdoor theater and it relates more particularly to a novel construction in outdoor theaters whereby the transportation facilities to and from the theater are made to constitute an element of the seating facilities of the theater . . . wherein the performance, such as a motion picture show or the like, may be seen and heard from a series of automobiles so arranged in relation to the stage or screen, that the successive cars behind each other will not obstruct the view.

— Patent application by R. M. Hollingshead, August 6, 1932.

With three investors, his cousin John Smith, Edward Ellies, and Oliver Willets, he formed a company called Park-It Theatres, Inc. The building of the drive-in began when the patent was official on May 16. The construction workers were taken off the Pennsauken Township relief rolls with a salary of 40 cents per hour for skilled workers and 20 cents per hour for laborers. In under three weeks, construction of the theatre was completed.

Their 400-acre (1.6 km^{2}) "Automobile Movie Theatre" opened on Admiral Wilson Boulevard in Pennsauken Township NJ on June 6, 1933. The marquee title read "Drive-In Theatre" - "World's First Sit In Your Car - See and Hear Movies". RCA Victor provided three six foot (1.8 m) by six foot speakers to go with the 40 foot (12 m) by 50 foot (15 m) screen. Following complaints from passengers in the rear of the theater lot, Hollingshead worked with RCA to design small speakers that could be mounted on cars and receive sound through a radio signal. The first movie screened was Wives Beware, starring Adolphe Menjou and having its second theatrical run. The charge was $0.25 per person and $0.25 per car, with 3 or more persons for $1. Hollingshead sold the theatre in 1935 and opened another one.

Park-It Theatres licensed the concept to Loews Drive-In Theatres, Inc., but had trouble collecting royalties in 1937. Eventually, after Loews was taken to court, Hollingshead's patent was ruled invalid in 1950.

== Personal life ==
According to the New Jersey State Census, Richard Milton Hollingshead married Elsa Hermine Collins on March 28, 1923, in Philadelphia. They had a son, Richard Milton Hollingshead III (born April 23, 1924, in Camden), who served as captain of the 1946 Yale Bulldogs football team.
