= 1900 Alabama gubernatorial election =

- August 6, 1900
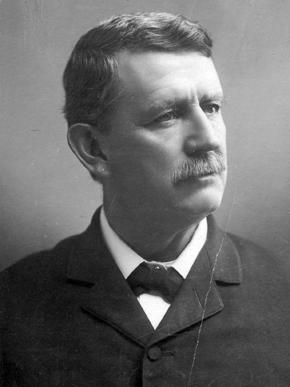

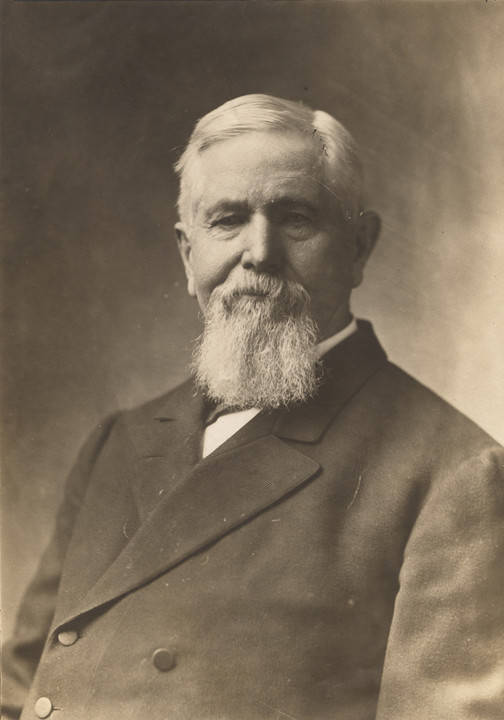

Nominee	William J. Samford	John Anthony Steele	Grattan B. Crowe
Party	Democratic	Republican	Populist
Popular vote	115,167	28,291	17,543
Percentage	70.96%	17.43%	10.81%
- County results Samford: 40–50% 50–60% 60–70% 70–80% 80–90% >90% Crowe: 30–40% 40–50% 50–60%
Governor before election
Joseph F. Johnston
Democratic
Elected Governor
William J. Samford
Democratic

The 1900 Alabama gubernatorial election took place on August 6, 1900, in order to elect the governor of Alabama. Incumbent Democrat Joseph F. Johnston decided not to run for a third term in office.

For the last time, the Governor of Alabama was elected to a two-year term. Afterwards, Alabama governors would be elected for terms of four years.

== Results ==
1900 Alabama gubernatorial election
Party	Candidate	Votes	%
Democratic	William J. Samford	115,167	70.96
Republican	John A. Steele	28,291	17.43
Populist	Grattan B. Crowe	17,543	10.81
Prohibition	H. L. Hargett	1,301	0.80
Total votes		162,302	100.00
Democratic hold			
