= 1900 Hoboken Docks fire =

Fire in Hoboken, New Jersey

Coordinates: 40.7387°N 74.0268°W

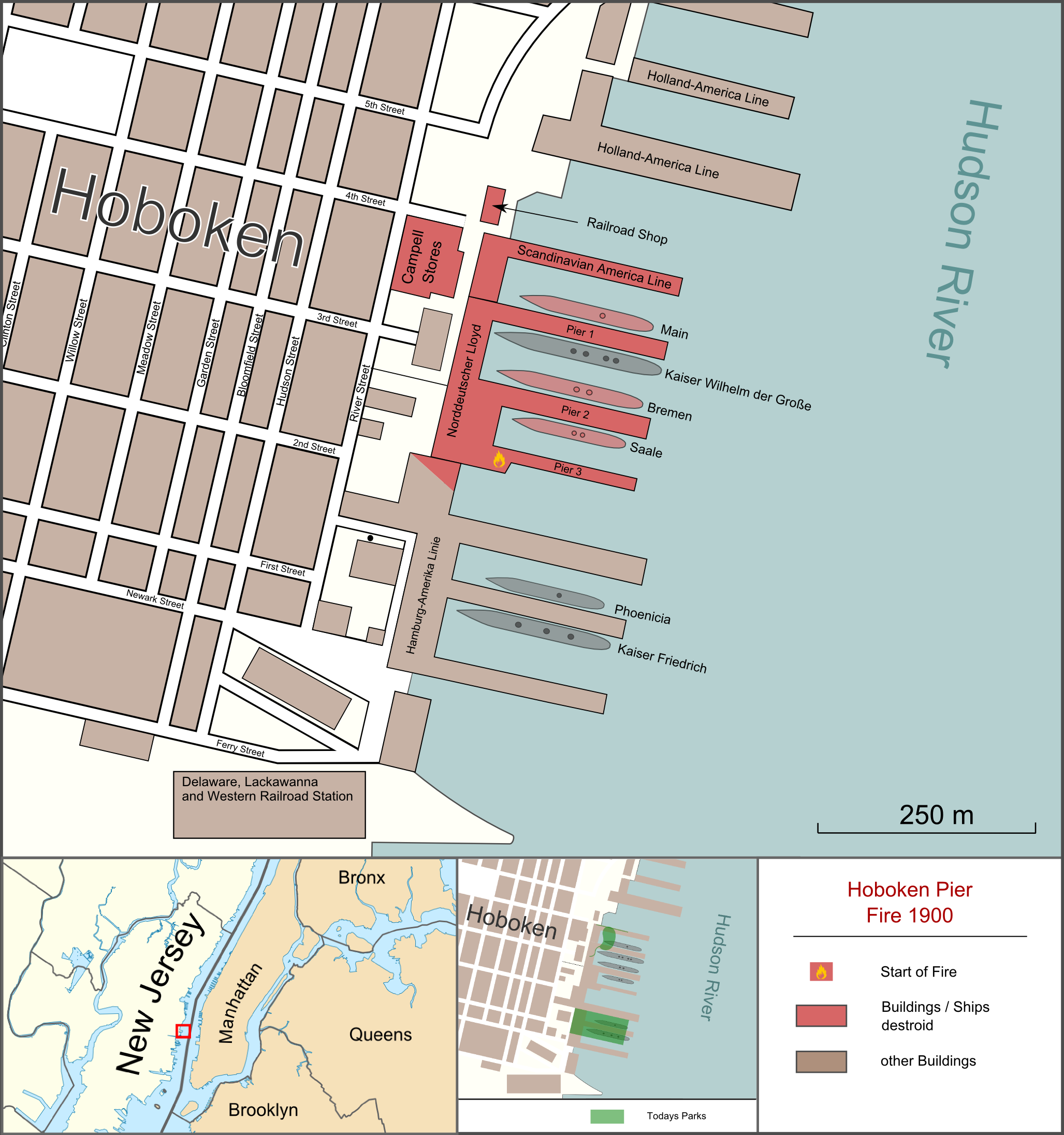
Hoboken Pier Fire

The 1900 Hoboken Docks fire occurred on June 30, 1900, and killed at least 326 people in and around the Hoboken, New Jersey piers of the Norddeutscher Lloyd (NDL) shipping company. The piers were in New York Harbor, at the foot of 3rd and 4th Streets in Hoboken, across the North River (Hudson River) from Manhattan in New York City. The area, a few blocks north of Hoboken Terminal, is now mostly part of the Hudson River, without docks: a waterfront bicycle path lines it.

The fire began when cotton bales stored on NDL's southernmost wharf caught fire, and winds carried the flames to nearby barrels of volatile liquids, such as turpentine and oil, which exploded in rapid succession. It burned NDL's Hoboken piers to the waterline, consumed or gutted nearby warehouses, gutted three of NDL's major transatlantic liners, and damaged or destroyed nearly two dozen smaller craft. Most of the victims were seamen and other workers but included women visiting one of the ships.

== Ocean liner losses ==
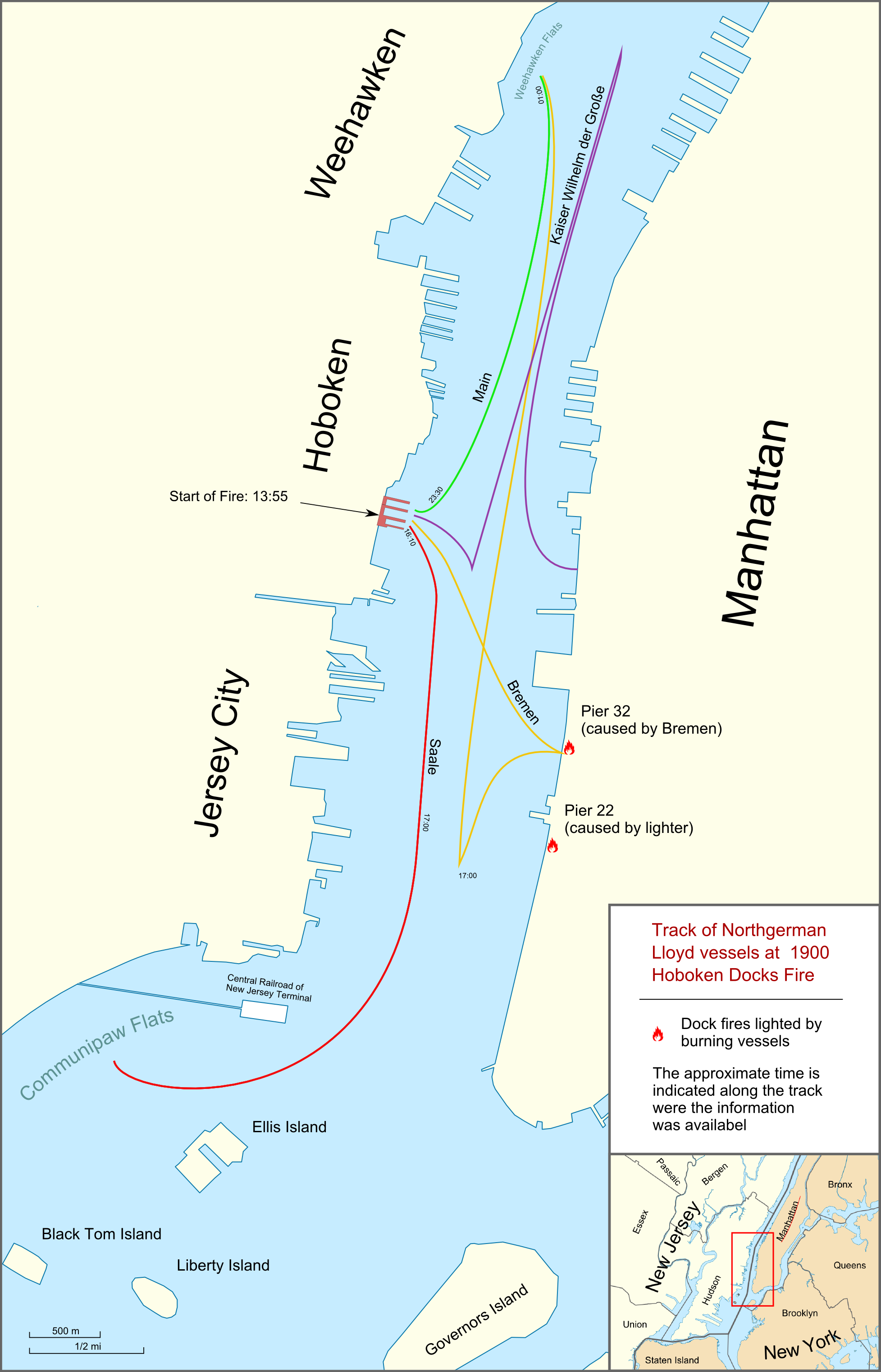
Tracks of the North German Lloyd ships during the Hoboken Pier Fire 1900

Saale was gutted, with the highest death toll. After she became engulfed in flames, her mooring lines were cut, leaving her to drift as fire reached those further below deck. Finally towed after she drifted toward New York piers, she settled in the Jersey flats near Liberty Island. Her death toll included her captain (August Johann Mirow), and members (primarily women) of a group known as Christian Endeavor, who were visiting the ship before the fire started.

Main was furthest from the fire's starting point, but was soon engulfed with fire. She was unable to get loose from her moorings for more than seven hours, until the fire was nearly over. Damaged nearly beyond repair, Main was ultimately towed to Weehawken, New Jersey, where she was beached. Amazingly, 16 coal trimmers who had survived the fire hiding in a coal bunker then crawled out of the hulk. Two days after the fire began, the red-hot ship continued to smolder and smoke, which further delayed rescue and recovery efforts.

Bremen also burned intensely. After her crew threw off her mooring lines, she drifted until she was towed to mid-stream by tugs. She eventually ran aground upriver near Weehawken. More than 200 people were on board when the fire began, including visitors. Initial reports indicated that all managed to leave the ship, but many jumped and may not have reached shore.

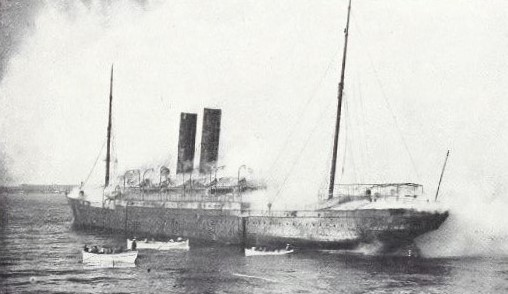
Fire aboard the SS Saale during the Hoboken Docks Fire. Photo by S.H. Horgan.

Many who died in the fires were interred at the Flower Hill Cemetery, North Bergen.

The holder of the Blue Riband at the time of the fire, NDL's Kaiser Wilhelm der Grosse, was also docked in the company's Hoboken piers, but fared better than its sister ships. She was the first of the steamers that tugs tried to pull away from the pier (15 minutes after the fire began).

The fire erupted on a Saturday that was considered a “half-holiday” when no departures were scheduled. Had any of the ships been ready to sail, the loss of life and property would have been much greater.

== Other losses ==
The fire also destroyed several Campbell Stores warehouses, built by the Hoboken Land & Improvement Company, the nearby piers of the Scandinavian America Line and a railroad shed. According to The New York Times, the railroad shed belonged to West Shore Railroad, although it was more likely a shed of Hoboken Shore Railroad (which connected the West Shore Railroad's lines at the Weehawken Terminal to the Hoboken docks). A shed of Hamburg America Line was partly chopped down during the fire by the fire service to avoid spreading of the fire to the Hamburg America Line piers. The total value of property losses due to the fire was estimated (the morning after the fire) at $6.175 million, and (the following year) at $5.35 million.

== Aftermath ==
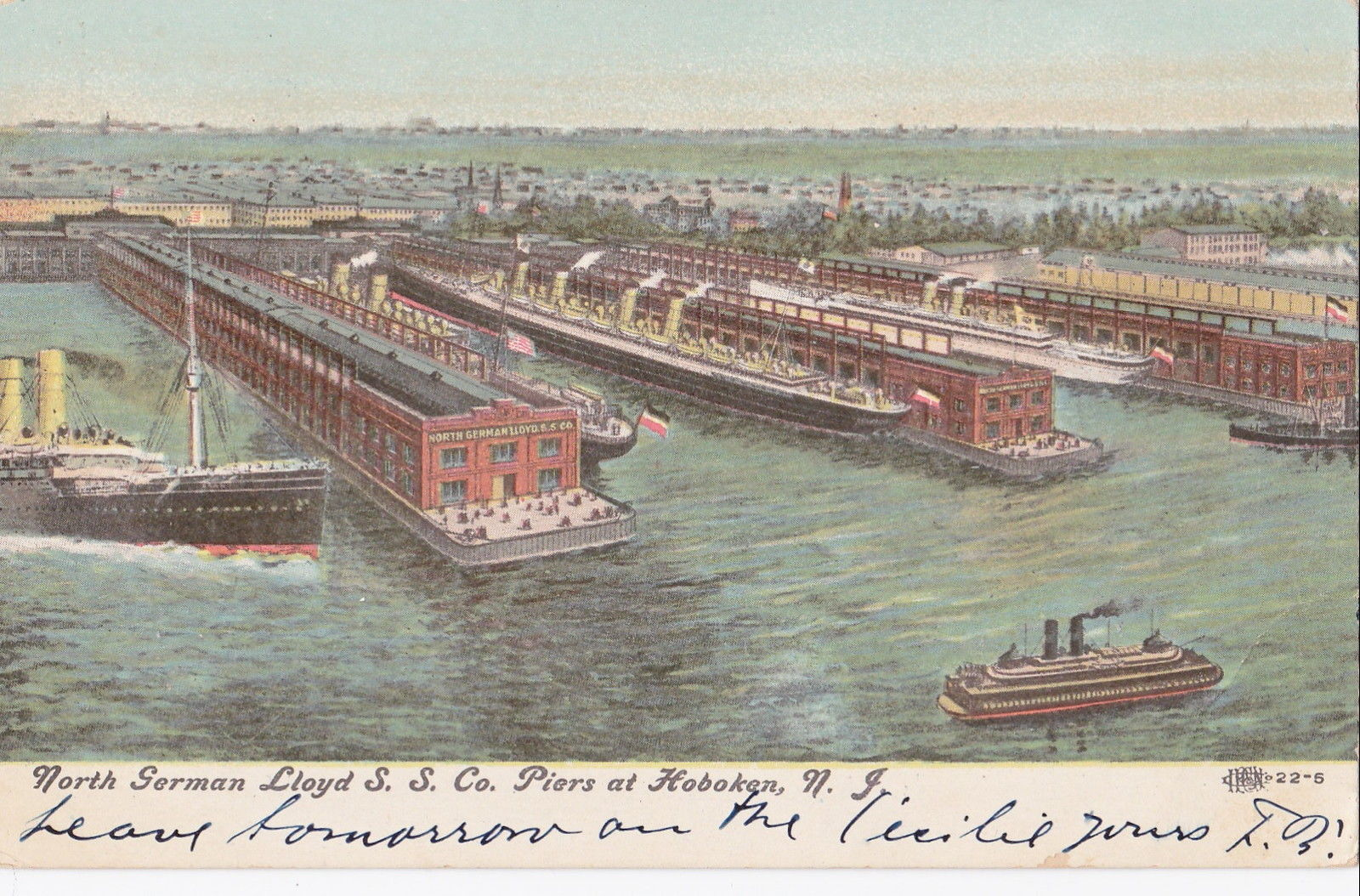
NDL's piers in 1909, after reconstruction

The NDL replaced its Hoboken piers with larger, stronger and more fireproof structures. The new steel piers were known as Hoboken Pier Nos. 1, 2, and 3. All of the damaged ocean liners returned to maritime service, Saale under a different name (the SS J. L. Luckenbach).

On the first anniversary of the fire, a large granite monument was dedicated in Flower Hill Cemetery in North Bergen, New Jersey above a mass grave containing unidentifiable bodies of the victims, listing the names of the dead and missing.

News stories of the fire had described below-deck crew “trying in vain to force their way through the small portholes, while the flames pressed relentlessly upon them.” The fire prompted arguments that portholes on all ships should be at least 11 in × 13 in (28 cm × 33 cm) in size, to make it easier for them to serve as a means of escape. Others responded that making portholes larger would be cost-prohibitive, or come at the expense of structural strength. In the end, regulations required portholes to be big enough for a person of reasonable size to escape.

=== Later fires in Hoboken ===
In 1905, a fire consumed the Delaware, Lackawanna and Western Railroad's Hoboken ferry piers.

The piers immediately south of the NDL piers, owned before World War I by Hamburg America Line, were later also destroyed by fire. In 1921, two of the three piers (Hoboken Pier Nos. 5 and 6) were consumed in a fire that also scorched the SS Leviathan. In August 1944, Pier No. 4 burned, killing three and briefly setting afire the SS Nathaniel Alexander, a Liberty ship.
