= Morris Talpalar =

American sociologist (1900–1979)

Morris Talpalar (May 28, 1900 – July 7, 1979) was an American sociologist. He was the author of The Sociology of Colonial Virginia (1960) and The Sociology of the Bay Colony (1976), covering American history of the period between 1600 and 1770. Among Talpalar's merits is his emphasis in describing characters and human values predominant in the colony, and how they influenced the ideological background for the war. He supported that a change in these values was determinant for the establishment of slavery in Virginia, when the original Puritan rulers that dominated the political scene before 1660 were replaced by the rules of Cavaliers. This transition was the basis for the shift from traditional indentured servitude to slavery (temporarily versus permanent unfree labor) that was implemented in the colony. All these contributions have been considered as unique for their objectivity and originality.
