= Gordon MacQuarrie =

Gordon MacQuarrie (July 3, 1900 – November 10, 1956) was an American writer and journalist. Born in Superior, Wisconsin, he is best known for his short stories involving hunting and fishing, and for his semi-fictional organization known as The Old Duck Hunters' Association, Inc.(ODHA, Inc.) He died unexpectedly in Milwaukee, Wisconsin of a heart attack.

The Old Duck Hunters stories were originally published in various outdoor related periodicals of the early 20th Century. They were posthumously gathered into book form in three anthologies entitled: Stories of the Old Duck Hunters & Other Drivel, More Stories of the Old Duck Hunters, and Last Stories of the Old Duck Hunters. The first of these was originally published in 1967 by Stackpole Publishing, New York. Currently, all three volumes are available from Willow Creek Press, Minocqua, Wisconsin, both in printed and audio (abridged) form. Three subsequent volumes have also been released by Willow Creek Press.

Following his August, 1924 graduation from the University of Wisconsin–Madison, with a bachelor's degree in Journalism, MacQuarrie joined the Superior Evening Telegram as a cub reporter. In 1925 he became City Editor of the Telegram and was promoted to Managing Editor in 1927. He held that position until April, 1936 when he accepted a position with the Milwaukee Journal and moved to Milwaukee with wife, Helen Marjorie (Peck) MacQuarrie (1901-1952), and their only child, daughter Sally (1929-1994.) In September, 1954, MacQuarrie married fellow Journal reporter Ellen Gibson.

MacQuarrie invented the Old Duck Hunters Association as a literary vehicle and used his real-life father-in-law, Allan Peck, as the model for the President of the association. The stories were often upbeat and humorous with MacQuarrie frequently serving as the butt of the joke. MacQuarrie is credited with becoming the first full-time, professional outdoor writer in America when he became the outdoor editor of the Milwaukee Journal on April 19, 1936. Also in 1936, MacQuarrie developed a relationship with influential conservationist, Aldo Leopold. Their friendship lasted until Leopold's death in 1948; however, MacQuarrie remained a staunch supporter of Leopold's Land Ethic, and wrote frequently about Leopold's work until his own death in 1956.

In June, 2003 a biography of MacQuarrie was released by the Wisconsin State Historical Society, entitled Gordon MacQuarrie: The Story of an Old Duck Hunter, ISBN 0-87020-343-6, written by Keith Crowley.

The Gordon MacQuarrie Memorial Wetlands are named for Gordon MacQuarrie (46.561162,-92.27640).

== Gordon MacQuarrie Award ==
After his death, the Milwaukee Journal established the Gordon MacQuarrie award to recognise Wisconsin outdoor writers who "best communicated an understanding of nature, professed an environmental ethic, and displayed journalistic integrity in keeping with the example set by Macquarrie himself.

== Published books ==
- Stories of the Old Duck Hunters & Other Drivel, ISBN 0-932558-25-9
- More Stories of the Old Duck Hunters, ISBN 0-932558-18-6
- Last Stories of the Old Duck Hunters, ISBN 0-932558-24-0
- MacQuarrie Miscellany, ISBN 0-932558-38-0
- Fly Fishing with MacQuarrie ISBN 1-57223-025-8
- The Gordon MacQuarrie Sporting Treasury, ISBN 1-57223-032-0
