= The Tramp and the Crap Game =

- Music by: Silent film
- Production company: Edison Mfg. Co.
- Distributed by: Edison Mfg. Co.
- Release date: 1900
- Country: United States

The Tramp and the Crap Game is a silent film from the year 1900. It's unknown if a copy survives, but it could be lost. It is unwatchable on computers.
