= William J. Samford =

American politician (1844–1901)

William James Samford
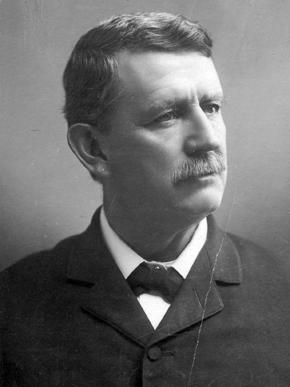

31st Governor of Alabama
- In office December 1, 1900 – June 11, 1901
- Preceded by: Joseph F. Johnston
- Succeeded by: William D. Jelks

Member of the U.S. House of Representatives from Alabama's 3rd district
- In office March 4, 1879 – March 3, 1881
- Preceded by: Jeremiah N. Williams
- Succeeded by: William C. Oates

Personal details
- Born: September 16, 1844 Greenville, Georgia, U.S.
- Died: June 11, 1901 (aged 56) Tuscaloosa, Alabama, U.S.
- Resting place: Rosemere Cemetery, Opelika, Alabama, U.S.
- Party: Democratic
- Spouse: Caroline Elizabeth Drake
- Relatives: Elizabeth Caroline Dowdell (aunt)
- Profession: Lawyer

William James Samford (September 16, 1844 – June 11, 1901) was an American attorney and politician who served as the 31st governor of Alabama and in the United States House of Representatives.

== Early life and education ==
William James Samford was born on September 16, 1844, in Greenville, Georgia. His father was William Flewellyn Samford, and his mother was Susan Lewis Dowdell Samford. In 1846, he moved with his parents to Chambers County, Alabama. He was educated in the public schools of Chambers and Auburn, Alabama. He then attended the East Alabama Male College (now Auburn University) before transferring to the University of Georgia.

== Career ==
During the American Civil War, Samford served in the Confederate States Army as a lieutenant in the 46th Alabama Infantry Regiment that fought in Tennessee, Kentucky, and Mississippi. He was taken prisoner in the Battle of Champion Hill in Hinds County, Mississippi and spent eighteen months in captivity at Johnson's Island.

After the Civil War, Samford began farming. In 1867, he was admitted to the Alabama State Bar and established a law practice in Opelika, Alabama. He was also an ordained minister of the Methodist Episcopal Church South.

Samford entered politics in 1872, serving as a city alderman and alternate elector for the Horace Greeley ticket. In 1874, he was a delegate to the state constitutional convention. In 1878, he was elected as a Democrat to the United States Congress, where he served for one term.

Though he took office as governor in December 1900, he missed the first few weeks of his gubernatorial term because he was out of the state receiving medical treatment. During this time, William D. Jelks, then President of the Alabama Senate, acted as governor until December 26, 1900.

After six months in office, he died on June 11, 1901, and William D. Jelks succeeded him as governor.

== Personal life ==
Samford married Caroline Elizabeth Drake in 1865. He was a devout Methodist and a licensed preacher in the Methodist Episcopal Church, South.

Party political offices
Preceded by Joseph F. Johnston	Democratic nominee for Governor of Alabama; 1900	Succeeded by William D. Jelks
U.S. House of Representatives
Preceded by Jeremiah N. Williams	Member of the U.S. House of Representatives from Alabama's 3rd congressional district March 4, 1879 – March 3, 1881	Succeeded by William C. Oates
Political offices
Preceded by Joseph F. Johnston	Governor of Alabama; 1900–1901	Succeeded by William D. Jelks
