= SS Main (1900) =

German passenger ship seized in WWI

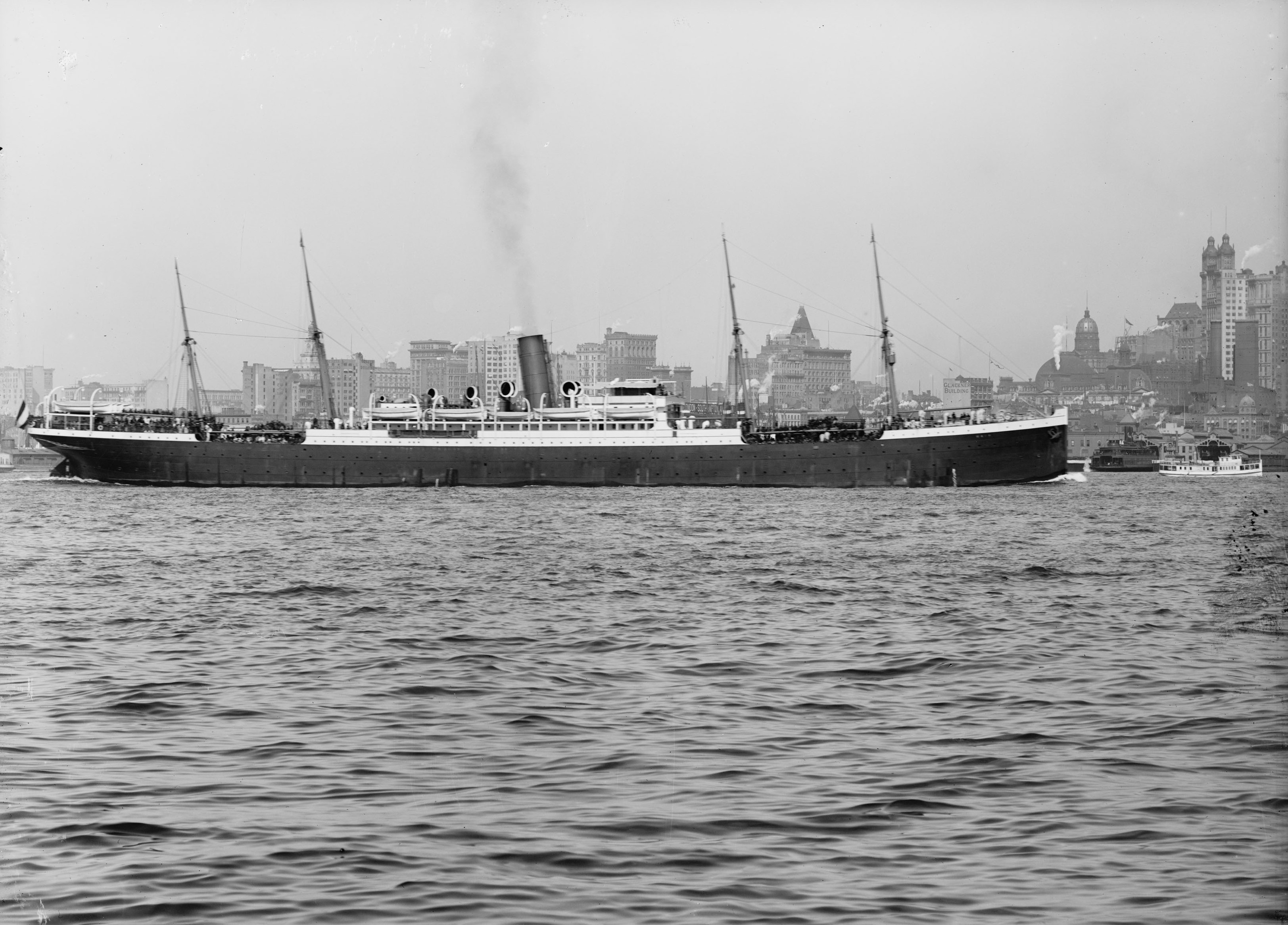
- SS Main in New York ca. 1908

History

Germany
- Name: Main
- Namesake: The river Main
- Owner: North German Lloyd (1900-1914)
- Port of registry: Bremen
- Route: Bremen — New York — Baltimore
- Builder: Blohm & Voss; Hamburg, Germany
- Launched: 10 February 1900
- Acquired: 22 April 1900
- Out of service: 1921
- Fate: Scrapped 1925

General characteristics
- Class & type: Rhein-class ocean liner
- Tonnage: 10,058 GRT
- Length: 152.70 m (501 ft 0 in) lbp; 158.50 m (520 ft 0 in) o/a
- Beam: 17.70 m (58 ft 1 in)
- Draft: 28 ft (8.5 m)
- Propulsion: 2 quadruple-expansion steam engines; twin screw propellers
- Speed: 14.5 knots (26.9 km/h)

SS Main was an ocean liner of the Rhein class of North German Lloyd. She was in service on the route from Bremen to Baltimore from her 1900 launch until seized by the Allies of World War I in 1914, and was involved in the 1900 Hoboken Docks fire. Unlike her sister ships Neckar and Rhein, she never entered service for the United States Navy.

== History ==
SS Main was launched on 10 February 1900 by Blohm & Voss of Hamburg, Germany, for North German Lloyd. The ship was 152.70 metres (501 ft 0 in) long between perpendiculars (158.50 metres (520 ft 0 in) overall) was 58 feet 1 inch (17.70 m) abeam, and had a draft of 8.5 metres (28 ft). The ship's two quadruple-expansion steam engines turned her twin screw propellers that drove her at speeds of 14.5 knots (26.9 km/h). She had one funnel and four masts and could carry 139 first class passengers, 125 second class passengers and 2500 steerage passengers. Her maiden voyage was on 28 April starting from Bremerhaven to New York City.

After only a few months in revenue service she was completely gutted in the 1900 Hoboken Docks fire on 30 June 1900. Even though the Main was furthest from the fire's starting point, she was soon on fire. As she was unable to get loose from her moorings for more than seven hours, the damage was nearly beyond repair. The Main was ultimately towed to Weehawken, New Jersey, where she was beached. Amazingly, 16 coal trimmers who had survived the fire hiding in a coal bunker then crawled out of the hulk. Two days after the fire began, the red-hot ship continued to smolder and smoke, which further delayed rescue and recovery efforts. On 27 July she was refloated and sent to Newport News for repair. On 15 October 1901 she reentered revenue service.

The last voyage of Main from Bremen to Baltimore was in June 1914. Afterward she was seized by the Allied forces in Antwerp, but in October returned to Germany. Following the war, on 21 May 1919 she was awarded to the British Shipping Controller, where she was operated by Turner, Brightman & Co. On 30 June 1921 she was turned over to the French government and laid up. The liner Main was scrapped in 1925.
