= Tim Coly =

German rugby union player (born 1979)

- Born: Tim Coly; 5 July 1979 (age 47)
- Height: 1.79 m (5 ft 10 in)
- Weight: 105 kg (16 st 7 lb)

Rugby union career
- Position: Hooker
Senior career
| Years | Team | Apps | (Points) |
| 2004 | RGH | | |
| 2004 - 2008 | RC Strasbourg | | |
| 2008 - present | RGH | | |
- Correct as of 26 February 2010
International career
| Years | Team | Apps | (Points) |
| | Germany | 36 | |
- Correct as of 8 April 2012

Tim Coly (born 5 July 1979) is a German international rugby union player, playing for the RG Heidelberg in the Rugby-Bundesliga and the German national rugby union team.

Coly begun playing rugby in 1984 and has since played for RG Heidelberg and RC Strasbourg.

Coly only played a very limited number of matches in 2010-11, caused by work commitments, injury and the fact that he became a father but aims to play a full season in 2011-12.

== Honours ==
=== Club ===
- German rugby union cup
  - Winners: 2004

=== National team ===
- European Nations Cup - Division 2
  - Champions: 2008

== Stats ==
Tim Coly's personal statistics in club and international rugby:

=== Club ===
| Year | Club | Division | Games | Tries | Con | Pen | DG | Place |
|---|---|---|---|---|---|---|---|---|
| 2008-09 | RG Heidelberg | Rugby-Bundesliga | 8 | 0 | 0 | 0 | 0 | 5th |
| 2009-10 | RG Heidelberg | Rugby-Bundesliga | 14 | 5 | 0 | 0 | 0 | 2nd — Semi-finals |
| 2010-11 | RG Heidelberg | Rugby-Bundesliga | 3 | 0 | 0 | 0 | 0 | 4th — Semi-finals |
| 2011-12 | RG Heidelberg | Rugby-Bundesliga | 13 | 1 | 0 | 0 | 0 | 6th |

- As of 30 April 2012

=== National team ===
==== European Nations Cup ====
| Year | Team | Competition | Games | Points | Place |
|---|---|---|---|---|---|
| 2006-2008 | Germany | European Nations Cup Second Division | 6 | 0 | Champions |
| 2008-2010 | Germany | European Nations Cup First Division | 10 | 0 | 6th — Relegated |
| 2010–2012 | Germany | European Nations Cup Division 1B | 1 | 0 | 4th |

==== Friendlies & other competitions ====
| Year | Team | Competition | Games | Points |
|---|---|---|---|---|
| 2008 | Germany | Friendly | 1 | 0 |
| 2009 | Germany | Friendly | 1 | 0 |

- As of 8 April 2012
