= Mustafa Güngör =

German rugby union player (born 1981)

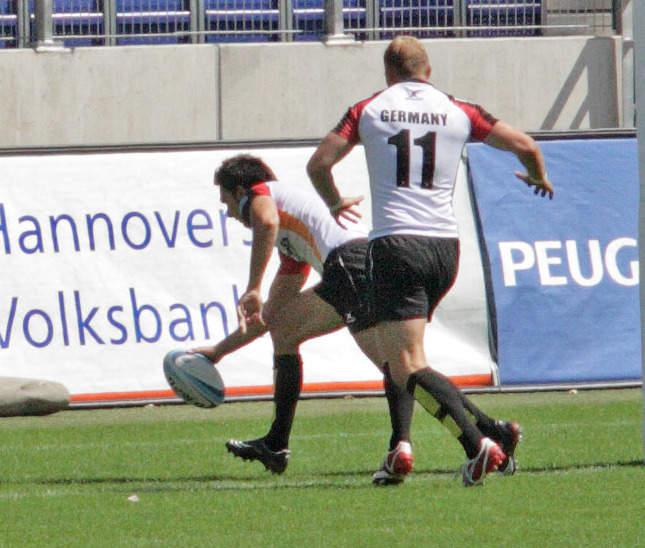
- Güngör scoring at the 2008 Hannover Sevens
- Born: Mustafa Güngör; 14 April 1981 (age 45) Aachen, West Germany
- Height: 1.81 m (5 ft 11 in)
- Weight: 88 kg (13 st 12 lb)

Rugby union career
- Position: Scrum-half
Senior career
Years	Team	Apps	(Points)
- RC Aachen
- RC Visé
- SO Millau
- SCN
2011	RGH		
2011–present	TVP	15	(30)
- Correct as of 30 April 2012
International career
Years	Team	Apps	(Points)
2003 - 2012	Germany	46	
- Correct as of 28 April 2013
National sevens team
Years	Team		Comps
- Germany 7s

Mustafa Güngör is a German international rugby union player, playing for the TV Pforzheim in the Rugby-Bundesliga and the German national rugby union team. He is a former captain of the German Sevens and German XV team. He made his debut for Germany in a game against Sweden in 2003.

== Biography ==
Güngör, born in Aachen of Turkish descent, began playing rugby when he was nine years old in 1990. By his own admission, he plays rugby because he is not good enough to play Bundesliga football.

He originated from the youth department of the RC Aachen. He spent some time with the French club SO Millau and the Belgian team RC Visé in 2004. He then joined RG Heidelberg, playing for the club until 2011. With Heidelberg, he won two German championships, in 2006 and 2007 and made a losing appearance in the 2008 final against SC 1880 Frankfurt. His greatest success as a national team player was the promotion to Division 1 of the European Nations Cup in 2008.

He was part of the German Sevens side at the World Games 2005 in Duisburg, where Germany finished 8th.

He captained Germany at the 2008 Hannover Sevens event where he came fifth in the point scoring ranking. He has also been selected to play for the Wild Titans, a selection made up partly of players of the Wild Rugby Academy, in an international tournament in Hong Kong in March 2009. He was part of the German team at the 2009 London Sevens, and the 2009 Hannover Sevens. He was not selected for the qualifying tournaments of the 2010 European sevens Championship but captained the German team again in 2011, when it won promotion to the 7s Grand Prix Series for 2012.

Güngör became the new captain of Germany's XV on 8 December 2009, after the retirement of the previous captain Jens Schmidt, and played his first game in this position four days later, against Hong Kong. He was replaced in this position in the second half of 2010 by Alexander Widiker.

After a lengthy career with RG Heidelberg, Güngör decided to leave the club at the end of the 2010–11 season but has not signed for a new club yet, with TV Pforzheim and SC 1880 Frankfurt being the most likely candidates for his services. Güngör decided to join TV Pforzheim after the opening round of the 2011–12 season.

With seven and thirteen tries, he was his club's best try scorer in the 2008–09 and 2010–11 seasons.

Güngör was one of four German rugby players, together with Fabian Heimpel, Raphael Pyrasch and Bastian Himmer, who were promised by the DRV that they could join the Sportkompanie of the Bundeswehr, a special sports unit within the German Army. This was however not the case, with no places available in the unit for male rugby players until 2012. This led to great resentment by the players towards the DRV and its then-chairman Claus-Peter Bach because all four had turned down other options in favour of the promised place in the Sportkompanie.

After finishing his time in the German Army's Sportfördergruppe at the end of 2012 Güngör announced in January 2013 that he would retire from international rugby but continue to play club rugby.

== Honours ==
=== Club ===
- German rugby union championship
  - Champions: 2006, 2007
  - Runners up: 2008, 2012
- German rugby union cup
  - Runners up: 2006, 2007, 2008

=== National team ===
- European Nations Cup – Division 2
  - Champions: 2008

== Stats ==
Mustafa Güngör's personal statistics in club and international rugby:

=== Club ===
Year	Club	Division	Games	Tries	Con	Pen	DG	Place
2007–08	RG Heidelberg	Rugby-Bundesliga	14					2nd – Runners up
2008–09	RG Heidelberg	Rugby-Bundesliga	14	7	1	5	1	5th
2009–10	RG Heidelberg	Rugby-Bundesliga	16	9	0	0	1	2nd – Semi-finals
2010–11	RG Heidelberg	Rugby-Bundesliga	15	13	4	0	2	4th – Semi-finals
2011–12	TV Pforzheim	Rugby-Bundesliga	15	6	0	0	0	3rd – Runners up

- Updated 25 August 2011

=== National team ===
==== European Nations Cup ====
Year	Team	Competition	Games	Points	Place
2006–2008	Germany	European Nations Cup Second Division	8	33	Champions
2008–2010	Germany	European Nations Cup First Division	10	6	6th – Relegated
2010–2012	Germany	European Nations Cup Division 1B	9	9	4th
2012–2014	Germany	European Nations Cup Division 1B	3	0	ongoing

==== Friendlies and other competitions ====
Year	Team	Competition	Games	Points
2007	Germany	Friendly	1	0
2008	Germany	Friendly	1	0
2009	Germany	Friendly	1	0
2010	Germany	Friendly	1	0

- Updated 28 April 2013
