= Germany at the 2010–2012 European Nations Cup =

Germany
- 2010-2012 season
- Head coach: Torsten Schippe
- Chairman: Claus-Peter Bach (-July 2011) Ralph Götz (July 2011-)
- ENC First Division-B: 4th
- Top try scorer: League: Kasten (6); All: Kasten (6)
- Top points scorer: League: Heimpel (46); All: Heimpel (65)

Germany at the 2010–2012 European Nations Cup saw a return of the German national rugby union team to the ENC Second Division, having been relegated without a win from the First Division in 2008–2010. The renaming of division within the ENC however meant, that the former Second Division is now named First Division B. The team struggled in the first half of the competition, only winning one of their five games but improved in the second half, when it won three games, to finish fourth overall and well clear of relegation.

Germany faced Belgium, Czech Republic, Moldova, Poland and the Netherlands in a competition that had been enlarged from five to six teams. Germany kicked off its campaign on 20 November 2010, when they played and lost to Poland in Frankfurt am Main, followed by a game against the Netherlands a week later in Amsterdam. The next matches were then played in March and April 2011, when Germany met the remaining three teams. Germany's first game of the autumn campaign in 2011 was against the Netherlands on 12 November 2011, followed by an away game in Poland a week later. The final three games of the competition for Germany were then played in March 2012.

Germany also played, like in the previous year, a friendly against Hong Kong, on 11 December 2010 at Heidelberg.

With the final game against Moldova, Germany's captain Alexander Widiker played his 51st game for his country, thereby equaling Horst Kemmling's record.

== Games ==
Germany suffered a defeat in its opening game of the 2010–2012 European Nations Cup First Division, losing to Poland 17-22 after leading 17-9 at half time. The defeat was seen as unnecessary by the president of the German Rugby Federation, Claus-Peter Bach, but he also considered Poland's victory as deserved. Germany went into the match with a new coach and assistant, a new captain, Alexander Widiker and five uncapped players.

Germany finally achieved its first win in the ENC since 26 April 2008, when it beat the Netherlands in Amsterdam on 27 November 2010. Its last victory in the European competition had come at the same place against the same opposition, just over 31 months earlier. It also won the following game, a friendly against Hong Kong, cementing its position as number 30 in the rugby world ranking. A loss in this game could have meant for Germany a drop as far as to position 37 in the ranking, instead, the country managed to cut down its deficit to 29th placed Ukraine.

Germany began its 2011 spring campaign with an unofficial friendly against a New Zealand Ambassadors XV, made up almost exclusively of players from New Zealand which are active in Germany and the Netherlands. The New Zealand embassy in Germany donated a cup for this match, the Ambassadors Cup.

The first competitive game of 2011, against the Czech Republic in Heidelberg, brought a disappointing 23-29 defeat for the German team. Germany lost the game in the first half, after which the Czech Republic lead 26-13.

The German team continued its 2011 campaign with a third defeat in the third game, against Belgium in Brussels. Belgium lead 28-13 after 59 minutes but Germany clawed back to earn a bonus point in its 25-28 defeat. The fifth game of Germany's ENC campaign also ended in defeat, this time in Moldova, ending all German hopes for promotion and instead condemning the team to struggle against relegation.

In an attempt to improve the performance of the team it was decided to have weekly training sessions for the members of the national team, held at different locations. Germany started with an improved performance in its 2011 autumn campaign, defeating the New Zealand Ambassadors XV 19–17 despite fielding a number of uncapped players, a side it had lost to 19–43 eight month earlier.

The German team nominated eight new, uncapped players for the encounter against the Netherlands on 12 November 2011, which the team won 23–7, thereby making a major step towards avoiding relegation.

In its second game of the 2011 autumn campaign, away against Poland, Germany took an 8–0 lead after 14 minutes but did not score another point after that. Poland scored 34 points after that of which 26 were scored by the Polish No 15, David Chartier.

Germany played three games in three weeks in March 2012 and showed signs of improvement. It won 20-17 away at the Czech Republic, narrowly lost by a point at home to eventual champions Belgium and won its final match, against Moldova, 40-7. Germany played strong first halves in their first two games but was lucky to hang on to its lead in the Czech Republic while, against Belgium, a half time lead of 22-9 was not enough to win the game. In the last game, Germany played its best performance of the campaign while Moldova displayed a weak side.

== Management & coaching ==
After the resignation of Rudolf Finsterer after the final game of the 2008-10 campaign, Bruno Stolorz, under the supervision of Peter Ianusevici, Germany's Director of Rugby, remained in charge of the German team. A final decision on the position was scheduled to be made in a meeting of board of the German Rugby Federation in May 2010 in Hanover. However, no new German coach was announced until July 2010. On 11 July 2010, Torsten Schippe was introduced as the new German coach, with South African Jakobus Potgieter as Schippe's assistant. Schippe had been coach of Germany once before, leading the team from 2000 to 2001.

Mustafa Güngör, who served as the captain of the German team since December 2009 was replaced by Alexander Widiker before the first match of the campaign. Pieter Jordaan was also confirmed as the new vice-captain of the German team.

== Debuts and retirements ==
Four players made their debut in Germany's first game of the campaign, against Poland, those being Arthur Zeiler, Sven Wetzel, Tim Menzel and James Keinhorst. Two more uncapped players, vice-captain Pieter Jordaan, who missed the game due to injury but hoped to play in the following game against the Netherlands and Dustin Eaton, who was part of the wider squad but not selected for the game, were originally also part of the squad.

With Jordaan in the starting line-up against the Netherlands as well as Sam Henderson, Germany fielded two more debutants in its second ENC game. Jordaan however was injured just before kick-off, during the warm-up, and had to be substituted. Nico Kanning was part of the squad as a substitute, being the third uncapped player in the line-up, and was substituted in during the game, receiving his first cap.

In the friendly against Hong Kong, Bastian Himmer made his debut and scored his first international try, while another debutant, Jannis Läpple, came on as a substitute.

Daniel Armitage made his debut for Germany against the Czech Republic in the first competitive game of 2011.

After a number of failed attempts, Pieter Jordaan finally made his debut for Germany against Belgium, where he scored two tries but was unable to prevent another defeat. In the game against Moldova, Gilles Valette and Felix Bayer made their debut for Germany.

For its first game of the return round of the ENC in November 2011 against the Netherlands, Germany nominated eight uncapped players, those being Rob May, Sean Armstrong, Callum Sauer, Olivier Galli, Raynor Parkinson, Guillaume Kasdorf, Mika Tyumenev und Stéphane Kohler. Of those, Kohler, Sauer, May, Armstrong, Parkinson and Galli were in the starting line-up while Kasdorf and Tyumenev were not fielded in the game.

Mika Tyumenev and Carlos Soteras-Merz made their debut for Germany against Poland in November 2011.

In the first game in March 2012, Benjamin Strappazon and Kieran Manawatu made their debut for Germany, while Chris Hilsenbeck made his in the second game and was the last player to make his debut in this campaign.

== Table ==
The final table:

Promoted to Division 1A
Relegated for 2012–2014

Place	Nation	Games				Points			Table points
Place	Nation	played	won	drawn	lost	for	against	difference	Table points
1	Belgium	10	9	0	1	303	149	+154	39
2	Poland	10	6	1	3	238	189	+49	31
3	Moldova	10	5	1	4	194	211	-17	26
4	Germany	10	4	0	6	229	212	+17	22
5	Czech Republic	10	4	0	6	160	217	-57	20
6	Netherlands	10	1	0	9	153	299	-146	6

== Games ==
=== Friendlies ===
11 December 2010	Germany	34–13	Hong Kong	Fritz-Grunebaum-Sportpark, Heidelberg
14:30	Try: Himmer 20', Simm 55', Widiker 61'; Con: Heimpel (2) 55', 61'; Pen: Heimpel (5) 22', 34', 35', 37', 40'	(Report)	Try: Jones 77'; Con: McColl 77'; Pen: Price 45', 46'	Attendance: 800; Referee: Radu Petrescu (Romania)

5 March 2011	Germany	19–43	New Zealand Ambassadors XV	Sportanlage in der Feldgerichtstrasse, Frankfurt am Main
14:00	Try: Kasten 54', Zeiler 66', Widiker 75'; Con: Fabian Heimpel (2) 66', 75'	(Report)	Try: Hughson 2', Leung-Wai 7', Gibson 13', T. Manawatu 50', Walker (2) 58', 80', Westerlund 71'; Con: K. Manawatu 2', T. Manawatu (3) 7', 58', 71'	Referee: Dana Teagarden (Germany)

5 November 2011	Germany	19–17	New Zealand Ambassadors XV	Sportanlage in der Feldgerichtstrasse, Frankfurt am Main
13:00	Try: Pyrasch 14', Joordan 19'; Pen: Parkinson (2) 9', 37'; Drop: Armstrong 47'	(Report)	Try: Walker 40', Elisara 59', Muggeridge 73'; Con: Elisara 59'	Attendance: 700

The two games against the New Zealand Ambassadors XV are not official international tests, no caps were awarded and matches were not counted in statistics

=== ENC matches ===
20 November 2010	Germany	17–22	Poland	Sportanlage in der Feldgerichtstrasse, Frankfurt am Main
14:30	Try: Güngör 7', Hauck 14'; Con: Heimpel (2) 7', 14'; Pen: Heimpel 43'	(Report)	Try: Bobryk 47'; Con: Chartier 47'; Pen: Chartier (5) 11', 33', 37', 53', 55'	Attendance: 1,000; Referee: Pedro Murinello (Portugal)

27 November 2010	Netherlands	10–29	Germany	Amsterdam
14:30	Try: Blom 11', Cornelisse 18'	(Report)	Try: Widiker 7', Liebig 37', Keinhorst 80'; Con: Heimpel 37'; Pen: Heimpel (4) 16', 36', 45', 76'	Referee: Stephano Marrama (Italy)

12 March 2011	Germany	23–29	Czech Republic	Fritz-Grunebaum-Sportpark, Heidelberg
14:30	Try: G. Franke 16', Schmidt 55'; Con: Heimpel (2) 16', 55'; Pen: Heimpel (3) 9', 30', 67'	(Report)	Try: Kutil (2) 12', 40'; Con: Vokrouhlík (2) 12', 40'; Pen: Vokrouhlík (5) 6', 18', 33', 38', 53'	Attendance: 2,000; Referee: Tony Raduta (Romania)

19 March 2011	Belgium	28–25	Germany	Brussels
15:00	Try: Berger (2) 26', 36', Williams 59'; Con: Williams (2) 36', 59'; Pen: Williams (3) 5', 7', 68'	(Report)	Try: Jordaan (2) 17', 77', Strauch 74'; Con: Heimpel 17', Güngör 77'; Pen: Heimpel (2) 10', 40'	Referee: Félix Villegas (Spain)

2 April 2011	Moldova	28–15	Germany	Dynamo Stadium, Chişinău
15:00	Try: Prepelita (2) 10', 56', Arhip 74'; Con: Gagauz (2) 10', 74'; Pen: Gagauz (3) 19', 35', 53'	(Report)	Try: Kasten 39', Liebig 47'; Con: Güngör 47'; Pen: G. Franke 37'	Attendance: 3,000; Referee: Radu Petrescu (Romania)

12 November 2011	Germany	23–7	Netherlands	Rudolf-Kalweit-Stadion, Hanover
14:00	Try: Jordaan 19', Franke 34', Hauck 51'; Con: Parkinson 19'; Pen: Parkinson 80'; Drop: Parkinson 17'	(Report)	Try: Barendregt 62'; Con: Koenen 62'	Attendance: 3,100; Referee: Pedro Murinello (Portugal)

19 November 2011	Poland	34–8	Germany	Gdańsk
19:30	Try: Chartier (2) 23', 78', Hotowski 29', Wojciech Łukasiewicz 46'; Con: Chartier (4) 23', 29', 46', 78'; Pen: Chartier (2) 15', 28'	(Report)	Try: Himmer 14'; Pen: Parkinson 6'	Attendance: 2,500; Referee: Igotz Gallastegui (Spain)

10 March 2012	Czech Republic	17–20	Germany	RC Tatra Smichov, Prague
13:00	Try: Cerny 50', Jirman 57'; Con: Cizek (2) 50', 58'; Drop: Cizek 67'	(Report)	Try: Kasten (2) 26', 44', Manawatu 78'; Con: Heimpel 27'; Pen: Heimpel 12'	Attendance: 2,500; Referee: Robrt Diaconescu (Romania)

17 March 2012	Germany	29–30	Belgium	Martinsee, Heusenstamm
15:00	Try: Armstrong 31', Strauch 33', Manawatu 39', Kasten 80'; Con: Manawatu (3) 32', 40', 80'; Pen: Manawatu 20'	(Report)	Try: Penalty try (2) 47, 78', Pierre Hendrickx 63'; Con: Williams (3) 48', 64', 78'; Pen: Williams (3) 5', 16', 396'	Attendance: 1,500; Referee: Stefano Roscini (Italy)

24 March 2012	Germany	40–7	Moldova	Fritz-Grunebaum-Sportpark, Heidelberg
14:30	Try: Kasten (2) 26', 512', May 38', Eckert 56', Manawatu 67', Strauch 73'; Con: Hilsenbeck (2) 57', 68'; Pen: Manawatu (2) 4', 11'	(Report)	Try: Arhip 31'; Con: Gagauz 32'	Attendance: 1,000; Referee: Vlad Iordăchescu (Romania)

== Player statistics ==
=== Squad ===
The following players are part of the German team during its 2010-12 campaign:

Backs
Player	Position	Club
Mustafa Güngör	Scrum-half	RG Heidelberg (2010–11) TV Pforzheim (2011–12)
Tim Menzel	Scrum-half	(France) US Colomiers (2010–11) TSV Handschuhsheim (2011–12)
Raphael Pyrasch	Scrum-half	Heidelberger RK
Sean Armstrong	Scrum-half	Heidelberger RK
Kieran Manawatu	Scrum-half	SC 1880 Frankfurt
Kieron Davies	Fly-half	(England) Luton RFC
Fabian Heimpel	Fly-half	RG Heidelberg
Raynor Parkinson	Fly-half	(Netherlands) RC Hilversum
Lars Eckert	Fly-half	SC Neuenheim
Chris Hilsenbeck	Fly-half	(France) US Colomiers
Benjamin Simm	Centre	DSV 78 Hannover
Clemens von Grumbkow	Centre	(Italy) Cavalieri Prato
Gilles Pagnon	Centre	(France) RC Draguignan
Pieter Jordaan	Centre	Heidelberger RK
Anjo Buckman	Centre	Heidelberger RK
Olivier Galli	Centre	(France) RC Orleans
Carlos Soteras Merz	Centre	TV Pforzheim
Marten Strauch	Wing	SC Neuenheim
Steffen Liebig	Wing	Heidelberger RK
James Keinhorst	Wing	(England) Otley R.U.F.C.
Mark Sztyndera	Wing	SC 1880 Frankfurt
Guillaume Franke	Wing	(France) RC Orléans
Bastian Himmer	Fullback	RG Heidelberg
Matthieu Franke	Fullback	(France) RC Orléans

Forwards
Player	Position	Club
Alexander Widiker (c)	Hooker	Heidelberger RK
Sven Wetzel	Hooker	TSV Handschuhsheim
Gilles Valette	Hooker	(France) Cahors Rugby
Mika Tyumenev	Hooker	DSV 78 Hannover
Tim Coly	Hooker	RG Heidelberg
Benjamin Krause	Prop	DSV 78 Hannover
Damien Tussac	Prop	(France) RC Toulon
Arthur Zeiler	Prop	Heidelberger RK
Patrick Schliwa	Prop	Heidelberger RK
Nico Kanning	Prop	(France) AC Bobigny
Felix Bayer	Prop	TSV Handschuhsheim
Stéphane Kohler	Prop	(France) CA Lannemezan
Benjamin Strappazon	Prop	(France) Stade Montois
Lukas Hinds-Johnson	Lock	RK 03 Berlin
Michael Poppmeier	Lock	(Italy) Amatori Catania
Jens Schmidt	Lock	TSV Handschuhsheim
Daniel Armitage	Lock	Heidelberger RK
Jannis Läpple	Lock	SC 1880 Frankfurt
Benjamin Danso	Lock	Heidelberger RK
Manuel Wilhelm	Lock	RG Heidelberg
Kehoma Brenner	Flanker	Heidelberger RK
Tim Kasten	Flanker	Heidelberger RK
Alexander Hug	Flanker	TSV Handschuhsheim
Sam Henderson	Flanker	SC 1880 Frankfurt
Rob May	Flanker	TSV Handschuhsheim
Callum Sauer	Flanker	TV Pforzheim
Alexander Hauck	Number eight	SC 1880 Frankfurt
Robert Mohr	Number eight	(France) La Rochelle

- Clubs listed are the club or clubs a player played for while playing for Germany in 2010-12, not current club.

=== Games ===
The following players have been selected for Germany from 2010 to 2012 in the country's European Nation Cup campaign and in friendlies:

Player	Caps	**2010**			**2011**					**2012**		
		**Pol**	**Ned**	**HK**	**Cze**	**Bel**	**Mol**	**Ned**	**Pol**	**Cze**	**Bel**	**Mol**
Benjamin Krause	46	**17** (substituted in)	**1**	**1** (substituted off)	**16** (substituted in)	**1**		**16** (substituted in)	**1**		16	**1** (substituted off)
Alexander Widiker	50	**2** (c) (substituted off)	**2** (c)	**2** (c) (yellow card)	**2** (c)	**2** (c)	**1** (c)	**2** (c)	**2** (c) (substituted off)	**2** (c) (yellow card)	**2** (c)	**2** (c)
Stéphane Kohler	3							**3** (yellow card) (substituted off)	**3**			**3** (substituted off)
Callum Sauer	5							**4**	**5**	**4**	**4** (substituted off)	**4**
Daniel Armitage	7				**4**	**4**	**4** (substituted off)	**5** (substituted off)		**5**	**5**	**5** (substituted off)
Tim Kasten	33	**8**	**8**	**8**	**8**	**6**	**8**	**6** (substituted off)		**6**	**6**	**6**
Kehoma Brenner	21		**6** (yellow card) (substituted off)	**6** (substituted off)	**6**	**7** (substituted off)	**6** (yellow card)	**18** (substituted in)	**6** (substituted off)	19	19	**7** (substituted off)
Rob May	5							**8** (yellow card)	**8** (substituted off)	**8**	**8**	**8**
Sean Armstrong	5							**9**	**9**	**9**	**9**	**9** (substituted off)
Christoper Hilsenbeck	2										**10**	**10** (substituted off)
Marten Strauch	15	**14**	**12**	**11**	**11**	**22** (substituted in)					**11** (substituted off)	**11**
Lars Eckert	25									**12**	**12**	**12**
Mark Sztyndera	7			**21** (substituted in)					**20** (substituted in)			**13** (substituted off)
Mustafa Güngör	42	**9** (substituted off)		**22** (substituted in)	**20** (substituted in)	**15**	**11**	**15**	**15**	**14** (yellow card)	**14**	**14**
Kieran Manawatu	3									**15**	**15**	**15**
Arthur Zeiler	9	**1** (substituted off)	**16** (substituted in)	**16** (substituted in)	**1**	**3** (substituted off)	**16** (substituted in)	**1**		17	**17** (substituted in) (substituted off)	**16** (substituted in)
Patrick Schliwa	6	16	**3** (substituted off)	**3** (substituted off)	**3** (substituted off)			22	16			**17** (substituted in)
Benjamin Danso	17							**17** (substituted in)	**18** (substituted in)	18	**18** (substituted in)	**18** (substituted in)
Anjo Buckman	7	**13**		**12** (substituted off)	21		**12** (substituted off)		**12** (substituted off)	20		**19** (substituted in)
Matthieu Franke	16				**14** (yellow card)	**14**		**11** (yellow card)		**21** (substituted in)	**20** (substituted in)	**20** (substituted in)
Fabian Heimpel	10	**10**	**10**	**10**	**10**	**10** (substituted off)	**20** (substituted in)			**10**	21	**21** (substituted in)
Tim Menzel	7	**21** (substituted in)	**9**	**9** (substituted off)	**9**	**9**	**9**	21	22	22	22	**22** (substituted in)
Benjamin Strappazon	2									**1** (yellow card)	**1** (yellow card)	
Damien Tussac	7	**3**								**3**	**3**	
Alexander Hauck	14	**7** (substituted off)		**5**	**7**	**5**	**7**	**7**	**7**	**7** (substituted off)	**7** (substituted off) (substituted in) (yellow card)	
Clemens von Grumbkow	31		**13**								**13**	
Bastian Himmer	5			**14**			**22** (substituted in)	**14**	**14**	**11** (substituted off)		
Gilles Pagnon	8	**12**	**14** (substituted off)		**13**	**13**	**13**			**13**		
Tim Coly	36									**16** (substituted in)		
Robert Mohr						**8**			**4**			
Raynor Parkinson	2							**10**	**10**			
Raphael Pyrasch	11		20	**20** (substituted in)			21	**19** (substituted in)	**11** (substituted off)			
Olivier Galli	2							**13**	**13**			
Mika Tyumenev	1							20	**17** (substituted in)			
Manuel Wilhelm	33								**19** (substituted in)			
Carlos Soteras-Merz	1								**21** (substituted in)			
Pieter Jordaan	3					**12**	**10**	**12** (substituted off)				
Gilles Valette	1						**2**					
Felix Bayer	1						**3** (substituted off)					
Alexander Hug	13	**6**	**19** (substituted in)	**4** (substituted off)	**18** (substituted in)	**19** (substituted in)	**5** (substituted off)					
Steffen Liebig	4	22	**22** (substituted in)	**15** (substituted off)	22	20	**14** (substituted off)					
Guillaume Franke	3				**15** (substituted off)	21	**15**					
Sven Wetzel	4	**18** (substituted in)	17	**17** (substituted in)	17	**16** (substituted in)	17					
Jannis Läpple	2			**19** (substituted in)	19	18	**18** (substituted in)					
Lukas Hinds-Johnson	6	**19** (substituted in)		**18** (substituted in)			**19** (substituted in)					
Benjamin Simm	21	**11**	**11**	**13**	**12**	**11**						
Nico Kanning	2		**18** (substituted in) (substituted off)			**17** (substituted in) (substituted off)						
Jens Schmidt	41	**4** (yellow card)	**4** (yellow card)		**5** (substituted off)							
Sam Henderson	2		**7**	**7**								
Michael Poppmeier		**5**	**5**									
James Keinhorst	2	**15**	**15**									
Kieron Davies	34	20										

- **Bold** numbers indicate player played in the game.
- Italics indicates did not play.
- denotes substituted off.
- (substituted in) denotes substituted on.
- (c) denotes captain.
- (yellow card) denotes sin bin.
- Germany had only 21 players available for the game against the Netherlands on 27 November 2010, because Pieter Jordaan injured himself during the warm-up.

== Scorers ==
=== ENC ===
==== Try scorers ====
Tries	Name	Pld
6	Tim Kasten	9
3	Kieran Manawatu	3
3	Pieter Jordaan	3
3	Marten Strauch	7
2	Steffen Liebig	2
2	Alexander Hauck	8
1	Guillaume Franke	2
1	James Keinhorst	2
1	Bastian Himmer	3
1	Jens Schmidt	3
1	Lars Eckert	3
1	Sean Armstrong	5
1	Rob May	5
1	Matthieu Franke	6
1	Mustafa Güngör	9
1	Alexander Widiker	10

==== Points scorers ====
Points	Name	Pld
46	Fabian Heimpel	7
30	Kieran Manawatu	3
30	Tim Kasten	9
15	Pieter Jordaan	3
15	Marten Strauch	6
11	Raynor Parkinson	2
10	Steffen Liebig	2
10	Alexander Hauck	8
9	Mustafa Güngör	9
8	Guillaume Franke	2
5	James Keinhorst	2
5	Bastian Himmer	3
5	Jens Schmidt	3
5	Lars Eckert	3
5	Sean Armstrong	5
5	Rob May	5
5	Matthieu Franke	6
5	Alexander Widiker	10
4	Christoper Hilsenbeck	2

=== Friendlies ===
Matches against the New Zealand Ambassadors XV not included

==== Try scorers ====
Tries	Name	Pld
1	Bastian Himmer	1
1	Benjamin Simm	1
1	Alexander Widiker	1

==== Points scorers ====
Points	Name	Pld
19	Fabian Heimpel	1
5	Bastian Himmer	1
5	Benjamin Simm	1
5	Alexander Widiker	1
