= Marten Strauch =

- Born: Marten Strauch; September 25, 1986 (age 40) Heidelberg, West Germany
- Height: 1.80 m (5 ft 11 in)
- Weight: 90 kg (14 st 2 lb; 198 lb)

Rugby union career
- Position: Centre
- Correct as of 6 March 2010
Senior career
Years	Team	Apps	(Points)
- RGH
–	SCN		
International career
Years	Team	Apps	(Points)
2007 -	Germany	19	(40)
- Correct as of 28 April 2013
National sevens team
Years	Team		Comps
- Germany 7s

Marten Strauch (born 25 September 1986 in Heidelberg) is a German international rugby union player, playing for the SC Neuenheim in the Rugby-Bundesliga and the German national rugby union team.

Strauch made his debut for Germany on 21 April 2007 against Ukraine.

He has been playing rugby since 1991.

Strauch has also played for the Germany's 7's side in the past, like at the World Games 2005 in Duisburg, where Germany finished 8th.

== Honours ==
=== National team ===
- European Nations Cup - Division 2
  - Champions: 2008

== Stats ==
Marten Strauch's personal statistics in club and international rugby:

=== Club ===
Year	Club	Division	Games	Tries	Con	Pen	DG	Place
2008-09	SC Neuenheim	Rugby-Bundesliga	17	7	0	0	0	3rd — Semi-finals
2009-10	SC Neuenheim	Rugby-Bundesliga	16	11	0	0	0	5th
2010-11	SC Neuenheim	Rugby-Bundesliga	5	1	0	0	0	5th
2011-12	SC Neuenheim	Rugby-Bundesliga	9	2	0	0	0	4th — Semi-finals

- As of 30 April 2012

=== National team ===
==== European Nations Cup ====
Year	Team	Competition	Games	Points	Place
2006-2008	Germany	European Nations Cup Second Division	4	5	Champions
2008-2010	Germany	European Nations Cup First Division	2	0	6th
2010–2012	Germany	European Nations Cup Division 1B	6	15	4th
2012–2014	Germany	European Nations Cup Division 1B	4	10	ongoing

==== Friendlies & other competitions ====
Year	Team	Competition	Games	Points
2007	Germany	Friendly	1	10
2008	Germany	Friendly	2	0
2010	Germany	Friendly	1	0

- As of 28 April 2013
