= Tim Kasten =

Germany international rugby union player

- Born: Tim Kasten; 27 January 1983 (age 43) Hannover, Germany
- Height: 1.86 m (6 ft 1 in)
- Weight: 105 kg (16 st 7 lb)

Rugby union career
- Position: Flanker
Amateur team(s)
Years	Team	Apps	(Points)
- SV 08 Ricklingen
Senior career
Years	Team	Apps	(Points)
???? - 2003	Germania		
2003 - 2004	DSV 78		
2004 - 2008	RGH		
2008 - 2009	Southend		
2009 - present	HRK	38	(195)
- Correct as of 11 May 2012
International career
Years	Team	Apps	(Points)
2004 - 2012	Germany	34	
- Correct as of 27 April 2013
National sevens team
Years	Team		Comps
- Germany 7s

Tim Kasten (born 27 January 1983) is a German international rugby union player, playing for the Heidelberger RK in the Rugby-Bundesliga and the German national rugby union team. He made his debut for Germany in a game against Sweden in 2004.

Kasten was born in Hannover, and has played rugby since 1986, first for the SV 08 Ricklingen and later, after the club was unable to field a youth team, for the SC Germania List. In 2003–04 he spent a season with DSV 78 Hannover but left the club when it faced financial trouble, to join RG Heidelberg, where he won two German championships with the club, before moving to England, where he played for the Southend RFC. In 2009–10, he returned to Germany, after suffering from injuries in England, and now plays for Heidelberger RK.

Kasten has also played for the Germany's 7's side in the past, like at the 2008 and 2009 Hannover Sevens and the 2009 London Sevens. He was also part of the German Sevens side at the World Games 2005 in Duisburg, where Germany finished 8th.

Tim Kasten is considered to be one of the best German rugby players, his father Ralf having played for Germany, too.

In 2011, Kasten extended his contract with HRK for another three seasons. In January 2013 he announced his retirement from the German national team, having played 34 times for the German XV.

== Honours ==
=== Club ===
- German rugby union championship
  - Champions: 2006, 2007, 2010, 2011, 2012
- German rugby union cup
  - Winner: 2004, 2011
- German sevens championship
  - Champions: 2003, 2005, 2008

=== National team ===
- European Nations Cup - Division 2
  - Champions: 2008

== Stats ==
Tim Kasten 's personal statistics in club and international rugby:

=== Club ===
Year	Club	Division	Games	Tries	Con	Pen	DG	Place
2007-08	RG Heidelberg	Rugby-Bundesliga	11					2nd — Runners-up
2008-09	Southend RFC	National Division Two						
2009-10	Heidelberger RK	Rugby-Bundesliga	7	6	0	0	0	3rd — Champions
2010-11	Heidelberger RK	Rugby-Bundesliga	15	12	0	0	0	1st — Champions
2011-12	Heidelberger RK	Rugby-Bundesliga	16	21	0	0	0	1st — Champions

- As of 11 May 2012

=== National team ===
==== European Nations Cup ====
Year	Team	Competition	Games	Points	Place
2006-2008	Germany	European Nations Cup Second Division	6	5	Champions
2008-2010	Germany	European Nations Cup First Division	5	0	6th — Relegated
2010–2012	Germany	European Nations Cup Division 1B	9	30	4th
2012–2014	Germany	European Nations Cup Division 1B	1	0	ongoing

==== Friendlies & other competitions ====
Year	Team	Competition	Games	Points
2007	Germany	Friendly	1	0
2008	Germany	Friendly	1	0
2010	Germany	Friendly	1	0

- As of 27 April 2013
