= Kehoma Brenner =

Germany international rugby union player

- Born: Kehoma Brenner; 12 January 1986 (age 40) Heidelberg, Germany
- Height: 1.78 m (5 ft 10 in)
- Weight: 90 kg (14 st 2 lb; 198 lb)

Rugby union career
- Position: Flanker
Senior career
Years	Team	Apps	(Points)
1992–2004	TBR		
2004–2007	HRK		
2007–2010	RGH		
2010–present	HRK	26	(20)
- Correct as of 11 May 2012
International career
Years	Team	Apps	(Points)
2006 -	Germany	46	(35)
- Correct as of 4 December 2013
National sevens team
Years	Team		Comps
- Germany 7s

Kehoma Brenner (born 12 January 1986) is a German international rugby union player, playing for the Heidelberger RK in the Rugby-Bundesliga and the German national rugby union team.

Brenner played in the 2011 and 2012 German championship final for Heidelberger RK, which the club won both.

He made his debut for Germany on 11 November 2006 against Moldova.

He plays rugby since 1992, having played for the TB Rohrbach (1992–2004), Heidelberger RK (2004–2007) and RG Heidelberg (2007–2010) before returning to HRK once more in 2010.

Brenner has also played for the Germany's 7's side in the past, like at the 2009 Hannover Sevens and the 2009 London Sevens.

== Honours ==
=== National team ===
- European Nations Cup - Division 2
  - Champions: 2008

=== Club ===
- German rugby union championship
  - Champions: 2011, 2012, 2013
  - Runners up: 2008
- German rugby union cup
  - Winners: 2011
  - Runners up: 2008

== Stats ==
Kehoma Brenner's personal statistics in club and international rugby:

=== Club ===
Year	Club	Division	Games	Tries	Con	Pen	DG	Place
2007-08	RG Heidelberg	Rugby-Bundesliga	13					2nd — Runners-up
2008-09	RG Heidelberg	Rugby-Bundesliga	15	3	0	0	0	5th
2009-10	RG Heidelberg	Rugby-Bundesliga	17	0	0	0	0	2nd — Semi-finals
2010-11	Heidelberger RK	Rugby-Bundesliga	12	1	0	0	0	1st — Champions
2011-12	Heidelberger RK	Rugby-Bundesliga	14	3	0	0	0	1st — Champions
2012-13	Heidelberger RK	Rugby-Bundesliga						1st — Champions
2013-14	Heidelberger RK	Rugby-Bundesliga						

- As of 4 December 2013

=== National team ===
==== European Nations Cup ====
Year	Team	Competition	Games	Points	Place
2006-2008	Germany	European Nations Cup Second Division	3	0	Champions
2008-2010	Germany	European Nations Cup First Division	7	0	6th — Relegated
2010–2012	Germany	European Nations Cup Division 1B	7	0	4th
2012–2014	Germany	European Nations Cup Division 1B	7	10	ongoing

==== Friendlies and other competitions ====
Year	Team	Competition	Games	Points
2007	Germany	Friendly	1	0
2008	Germany	Friendly	1	0
2009	Germany	Friendly	1	0
2010	Germany	Friendly	1	0

- As of 4 December 2013
