= Manuel Wilhelm =

- Born: Manuel Wilhelm; 15 December 1980 (age 45) Ludwigsburg, Germany
- Height: 1.92 m (6 ft 4 in)
- Weight: 108 kg (17 st 0 lb)

Rugby union career
- Position(s): Number 8, Lock
Senior career
Years	Team	Apps	(Points)
- RGH
–	SCN		
–	Valencia		
–	RGH		
- Correct as of 21 March 2010
International career
Years	Team	Apps	(Points)
2003-2014	Germany	46	(20)
- Correct as of 4 December 2013

Manuel Wilhelm (born 15 December 1980 in Ludwigsburg) is a German international rugby union player, playing for the RG Heidelberg in the Rugby-Bundesliga and the German national rugby union team.

Manuel Wilhelm plays rugby since 1986, first for RG Heidelberg, later he spent one season with league rival SC Neuenheim, before he went back to his club of origin RG Heidelberg. After his military service Wilhelm played one season for CAU Valencia in the first Spanish division, before returning to RG Heidelberg. He won two German championships (15s) with the later, in 2006 and 2007, five 7s-championships in 1998, 1999, 2003, 2005, 2009 and the German cup in 2004. He also plays beach rugby for The Romantics B.R.F.C..

He was first called up for the German national team in 2000 but could not play because of injury and did not make his debut for Germany until 2003, in a game against Sweden.

He is the founder of Germany's biggest rugby website, TotalRugby.de.

In 2012, Wilhelm proposed a reform of the German league system which was approved at the Deutsche Rugby Tag, the annual general meeting of the DRV, in mid-July 2012. The new system will see the number of clubs in the Bundesliga increased from ten to 24, the league divided into four regional divisions of six clubs each and the finals series expanded from four to eight teams.

Wilhelm's father is from Ghana while his mother is German.

== Honours ==
=== Club ===
- German rugby union championship
  - Champions: 2006, 2007
  - Runners up: 1999, 2001, 2002, 2008
- German rugby union cup
  - Winners: 2004

=== National team ===
- European Nations Cup - Division 2
  - Champions: 2008

== Stats ==
Manuel Wilhelm's personal statistics in club and international rugby:

=== Club ===
Year	Club	Division	Games	Tries	Con	Pen	DG	Place
2007-08	RG Heidelberg	Rugby-Bundesliga	13	2	0	0	0	2nd — Runners-up
2008-09	RG Heidelberg	Rugby-Bundesliga	13	4	0	0	0	5th
2009-10	RG Heidelberg	Rugby-Bundesliga	14	5	0	0	0	2nd — Semi-finals
2010-11	RG Heidelberg	Rugby-Bundesliga	7	0	0	0	0	4th — Semi-finals
2011-12	RG Heidelberg	Rugby-Bundesliga	12	0	0	0	0	6th
2012-13	RG Heidelberg	Rugby-Bundesliga						4th — Semi finals
2013-14	RG Heidelberg	Rugby-Bundesliga						

- As of 4 December 2013

=== National team ===
==== European Nations Cup ====
Year	Team	Competition	Games	Points	Place
2006-2008	Germany	European Nations Cup Second Division	7	0	Champions
2008-2010	Germany	European Nations Cup First Division	10	0	6th — Relegated
2010–2012	Germany	European Nations Cup Division 1B	1	0	4th
2012–2014	Germany	European Nations Cup Division 1B	7	15	ongoing

==== Friendlies & other competitions ====
Year	Team	Competition	Games	Points
2008	Germany	Friendly	1	0
2009	Germany	Friendly	1	0

- As of 4 December 2013
