= DSV 78 Hannover =

German rugby union club, based in Hannover

(Germany) DSV 78 Hannover
- Full name: Deutscher Sportverein 1878 Hannover e.V.
- Union: German Rugby Federation
- Founded: 1878; 148 years ago
- Location: Hannover, Germany
- Chairman: Günter Küster
- Coach: Carsten Segert
- League: Rugby-Bundesliga
- 2015–16: Rugby-Bundesliga North/East, 3rd
Team kit

Official website
- www.hannover78.de

DSV 78 Hannover, founded as DFV Hannover in 1878, is Germany's oldest rugby union club. The club played in the 2nd Rugby-Bundesliga under the name DSV 78/08 Ricklingen, having formed an on-the-field union with SV 08 Ricklingen, another club from Hannover. It has recently become one of the four professional clubs in Germany.

At the end of the 2008–09 season, SV 08 declared, it would leave the union with DSV 78, leaving the latter to field its own team from 2009–10 onwards.

== History ==
=== Origins ===
The club was formed on 14 September 1878 as Deutschen Fußball-Verein Hannover gegründet 1878. Under the leadership of Ferdinand-Wilhelm Fricke, then only 15 years old, 24 young men formed the first football or rugby club in the country, a distinction was not made in Germany back then. The move was inspired by watching, and occasionally joining the players of the English Hannover Football-Club.

The first proper game of rugby however was not played until 1883, when "England" played "Germany" in Hannover on 17 October.

In 1899, Fricke discovered an ideal spot for the club to play at, Am Schnellen Graben, still the home of DFV today. A year later, the Verband Hannoverscher Fußball-Vereine (Association of Hanover football clubs) was formed and DFV won its first championship.

In 1909, the club adopted field hockey as another sport. In 1913, the DFV reached its first German championship final but lost to SC 1880 Frankfurt. Shortly after, the events of the First World War bring the activities of the club almost to a halt. Of the club members to lose their live in the war, Hermann Löns, "The Poet of the Heath", is the best known.

On 17 January 1927, the founding father of the club, F.W. Fricke, died. A year later, the club played in its second German final, and lost once more. In 1929, the club changed its name to Deutscher Sportverein Hannover gegründet 1878 e.V., reflecting the fact that it didn't play football but rugby.

During the Second World War, the clubs facilities suffered heavily from allied bombing raids and in 1945, the club house was in ruins.

In the post-war years, the DSV managed to rebuild its facilities and in 1949 it reopened its club house.

On 7 June 1964, Germany's oldest rugby club finally earned its first German championship, beating FC St. Pauli 11–0 in Offenbach am Main.

78 won two more championships, in 1968 and 1970, before the Rugby-Bundesliga was established in 1971. The club was part of the new league but did not achieve highly in its first ten years.

Its fourth national championship came in 1982, when RG Heidelberg was beaten 15–6. The club was to play in seven championship finals in a row from then on, winning the first four and then losing three. With a years interruption in 1989, the team returned for another championship in 1990. After another championship in 1991, DSV reached the final for a last time in 1993.

In the German Cup, the club continued to be successful, winning it in 1996 and 1998 and making final appearances in the two years after.

Up until the merger with SV 08 Ricklingen, the DSV 78 continued to be a top side in German rugby. DSV 78 finished first in their group in the 2012–13 season and qualified for the north/east division of the championship round, where it also came first. The club was knocked out in the quarter-finals of the play-offs after a 7–13 loss to RG Heidelberg.

The club finished first in the north-east championship round again in 2013–14, received a bye for the first round of the play-offs and, after defeating SC Neuenheim in the quarter-finals, lost to TV Pforzheim in the semi-finals. In the 2014–15 season the club finished first in the north-east championship group but was knocked out by SC Neuenheim in the quarter-finals of the play-offs, losing 42–21.

=== DSV 78/08 Ricklingen ===
DSV 78/08 Ricklingen colors

In 2003, the club decided to join up with SV 08 Ricklingen to form an on-the-field union and play under the name DSV 78/08 Ricklingen. Both clubs however continue to exist as separate entities. In 2009, SV 08 decided to leave this joint venture.

== Club honours ==
=== DSV 78 Hannover ===
- German rugby union championship
  - Champions: 1964, 1968, 1970, 1982, 1983, 1984, 1985, 1990, 1991
  - Runners up: 1913, 1928, 1966, 1971, 1986, 1987, 1988, 1993
- German rugby union cup
  - Winner: 1969, 1972, 1974, 1979, 1981, 1983, 1984, 1985, 1990, 1996, 1998
  - Runners up: 1970, 1973, 1993, 1999, 2000

=== DSV 78/08 Ricklingen ===
- 2nd Bundesliga
  - Runners-up: 2005, 2009
  - Division champions: 2005, 2009

== Recent seasons ==
=== DSV 78 Hannover ===
Recent seasons of the club:

Year	Division	Position
1997–98	Rugby-Bundesliga (I)	4th
1998–99	Rugby-Bundesliga North/East	3rd
1998–99	Bundesliga championship round	4th
1999–2000	Rugby-Bundesliga North/East	3rd
1999–2000	Bundesliga championship round	4th
2000–01	Rugby-Bundesliga North/East	2nd
2000–01	Bundesliga championship round	6th
2001–02	Rugby-Bundesliga	6th
2002–03	Rugby-Bundesliga	3rd
2003–2009	see DSV 78/08 Ricklingen	
2009–10	Rugby-Bundesliga	9th
2010–11	Rugby-Bundesliga	7th
2011–12	Rugby-Bundesliga	7th
2012–13	Rugby-Bundesliga qualification round – North	1st
2012–13	Rugby-Bundesliga championship round – North-East	1st — Quarter finals
2013–14	Rugby-Bundesliga qualification round – North	1st
2013–14	Rugby-Bundesliga championship round – North-East	1st — Semi finals
2014–15	Rugby-Bundesliga qualification round – North	1st
2014–15	Rugby-Bundesliga championship round – North-East	1st — Quarter finals
2015–16	Rugby-Bundesliga North-East	3rd

=== DSV 78/08 Ricklingen ===
Year	Division	Position
2003–04	Rugby-Bundesliga (I)	8th — Relegated
2004–05	2nd Rugby-Bundesliga North/East (II)	1st — Promoted
2005–06	Rugby-Bundesliga (I)	7th
2006–07	Rugby-Bundesliga	8th — Relegated
2007–08	2nd Rugby-Bundesliga North/East (II)	4th
2008–09	2nd Rugby-Bundesliga North/East	1st — Promoted

- Until 2001, when the single-division Bundesliga was established, the season was divided in autumn and spring, a Vorrunde and Endrunde, whereby the top teams of the Rugby-Bundesliga would play out the championship while the bottom teams together with the autumn 2nd Bundesliga champion would play for Bundesliga qualification. The remainder of the 2nd Bundesliga teams would play a spring round to determine the relegated clubs. Where two placing's are shown, the first is autumn, the second spring. In 2012 the Bundesliga was expanded from ten to 24 teams and the 2nd Bundesliga from 20 to 24 with the leagues divided into four regional divisions.

== Rugby internationals ==
In Germany's 2006–08 European Nations Cup campaign, Raphael Pyrasch, Benjamin Krause and Benjamin Simm were called up for the national team.

In the 2008–10 campaign, all three appeared for 78 and Germany again.

In the 2010–12 campaign, Benjamin Simm and Benjamin Krause were both selected for Germany again while Mika Tyumenev was a new selection.

For the opening match of the 2012–14 edition of the ENC against Ukraine the club had Benjamin Simm and Benjamin Krause selected for the team.

The club had four players selected for the German under-18 team at the 2009 European Under-18 Rugby Union Championship, these being Michail Tyumenev, Nicolas Müller, Dennis Denzin and Phil Szczesny. Of these, Phil Szczesny and Nicolas Müller also played at the 2010 tournament, while Adrian de Riz and Pascal Fischer were new additions.

== See also ==
- DSV 78/08 Ricklingen
