= Benjamin Simm =

German rugby union player

- Born: Benjamin Simm; 6 January 1986 (age 40) Hanover, Germany
- Height: 1.86 m (6 ft 1 in)
- Weight: 93 kg (14 st 9 lb)

Rugby union career
- Position: Centre
Senior career
Years	Team	Apps	(Points)
- DSV 78
International career
Years	Team	Apps	(Points)
2004 - present	Germany	26	
- Correct as of 28 April 2013
National sevens team
Years	Team		Comps
- Germany

Benjamin Simm (born 6 January 1986 in Hanover) is a German international rugby union player, playing for the DSV 78 Hannover in the Rugby-Bundesliga and the German national rugby union team. He made his debut for Germany in 2004.

His club, DSV 78/08 Ricklingen, won the 2nd Bundesliga title in 2008-09 and earned promotion to the Rugby-Bundesliga, now playing as DSV 78 Hannover.

Simm has also played for the Germany's 7's side in the past, like at the 2008 and 2009 Hannover Sevens and the 2006 and 2009 London Sevens.

== Honours ==
=== Club ===
- 2nd Bundesliga - North
  - Champions: 2009

=== National team ===
- European Nations Cup - Division 2
  - Champions: 2008

== Stats ==
Benjamin Simm's personal statistics in club and international rugby:

=== Club ===
Year	Club	Division	Games	Tries	Con	Pen	DG	Place
2008-09	DSV 78/08 Ricklingen	2nd Rugby-Bundesliga	12	19	0	0	0	1st — Promoted
2009-10	DSV 78 Hannover	Rugby-Bundesliga	16	4	0	0	0	9th
2010-11	DSV 78 Hannover	Rugby-Bundesliga	14	4	0	0	0	7th
2011-12	DSV 78 Hannover	Rugby-Bundesliga	7	3	0	0	0	7th

- As of 30 April 2012

=== National team ===
Year	Team	Competition	Games	Points	Place
2006-2008	Germany	European Nations Cup Second Division	3	0	Champions
2008-2010	Germany	European Nations Cup First Division	8	0	6th — Relegated
2010–2012	Germany	European Nations Cup Division 1B	4	0	4th
2012–2014	Germany	European Nations Cup Division 1B	5	5	ongoing

==== Friendlies & other competitions ====
Year	Team	Competition	Games	Points
2007	Germany	Friendly	1	0
2009	Germany	Friendly	1	5
2010	Germany	Friendly	1	5

- As of 8 April 2012
