= Alexander Hauck =

- Born: Alexander Hauck; 18 April 1988 (age 38) South Africa

Rugby union career
- Position: Number eight
Amateur team(s)
Years	Team	Apps	(Points)
- Sharks (Academy)
Senior career
Years	Team	Apps	(Points)
- SC 1880
International career
Years	Team	Apps	(Points)
	Germany	14	(10)
- Correct as of 8 April 2012

Alexander Hauck (born 18 April 1988) is a German international rugby union player, playing for the SC 1880 Frankfurt in the Rugby-Bundesliga and the German national rugby union team.

Hauck played in the 2010 and 2011 German championship final for SC 1880 Frankfurt, both of which the club lost.

He made his debut for Germany in a friendly against Hong Kong on 12 December 2009. Originally from South Africa, Hauck is eligible to play for Germany because of his German roots.

He hails from the youth academy of the Sharks.

== Honours ==
=== Club ===
- German rugby union championship
  - Runners up: 2010, 2011
- German rugby union cup
  - Winners: 2010

== Stats ==
Alexander Hauck's personal statistics in club and international rugby:

=== Club ===
Year	Club	Division	Games	Tries	Con	Pen	DG	Place
2009–10	SC 1880 Frankfurt	Rugby-Bundesliga	9	5	0	0	0	1st — Runners up
2010–11	SC 1880 Frankfurt	Rugby-Bundesliga	17	9	1	0	0	2nd — Runners up
2011–12	SC 1880 Frankfurt	Rugby-Bundesliga	12	6	0	0	0	2nd — Semi-finals

- As of 30 April 2012

=== National team ===
==== European Nations Cup ====
Year	Team	Competition	Games	Points	Place
2008–10	Germany	European Nations Cup First Division	4	0	6th — Relegated
2010–12	Germany	European Nations Cup Division 1B	8	10	4th

==== Friendlies & other competitions ====
Year	Team	Competition	Games	Points
2009	Germany	Friendly	1	0
2010	Germany	Friendly	1	0

- As of 8 April 2012
