= Matthieu Franke =

Germany international rugby union player

- Born: Matthieu Franke; 13 February 1985 (age 41) Nanterre, France
- Height: 1.93 m (6 ft 4 in)
- Weight: 95 kg (14 st 13 lb)

Rugby union career
- Position: Wing
Senior career
Years	Team	Apps	(Points)
	RC Orléans	72	(78)
- Correct as of 30 April 2012
International career
Years	Team	Apps	(Points)
2006–present	Germany		
National sevens team
Years	Team		Comps
- Germany 7s
- Correct as of (110)

Matthieu Franke (born 13 February 1985) is a German international rugby union player, playing for RC Orléans in the Fédérale 1 and the German national rugby union team. He is the brother of Guillaume Franke, who has also played for Germany. He made his debut for Germany in a game against Moldova on 11 November 2006.

== Biography ==
Franke was born in Nanterre, France, but represents Germany in international rugby.

Franke last played for Germany against Spain on 15 November 2008. He was selected to play for Germany again in February 2010 but missed out because of a knee injury and was replaced by his brother. He had to have surgery in early March and was out of action for the coming month. In the 2006-2008 European Nations Cup Second Division campaign, Franke was Germany's most prolific scorer with 109 points, playing as a fullback.

Franke's club, RC Orléans, provides a number of players to the German team, including him, his brother, Clemens von Grumbkow and Alexander Widiker.

Franke has also played for the Germany's 7's side in the past, like at the 2008 Hannover Sevens.

== Honours ==
=== National team ===
- European Nations Cup – Division 2
  - Champions: 2008

== Stats ==
Matthieu Franke's personal statistics in club and international rugby:

=== Club ===
Year	Team	Competition	Games	Points	Place
2006–07	RC Orléans	Fédérale 1	14	0	
2007–08	RC Orléans	Fédérale 1	18	35	
2008–09	RC Orléans	Fédérale 1	9	10	
2009–10	RC Orléans	Fédérale 1	9	10	
2010–11	RC Orléans	Fédérale 1	12	0	
2011–12	RC Orléans	Fédérale 1	10	23	

- As of 30 April 2012

=== National team ===
==== European Nations Cup ====
Year	Team	Competition	Games	Points	Place
2006–2008	Germany	European Nations Cup Second Division	8	96	Champions
2008–2010	Germany	European Nations Cup First Division	1	0	6th – Relegated
2010–2012	Germany	European Nations Cup Division 1B	6	5	4th

==== Friendlies & other competitions ====
Year	Team	Competition	Games	Points
2007	Germany	Friendly	1	9

- As of 8 April 2012
