= 2007–08 Rugby-Bundesliga =

- Countries: Germany
- Champions: SC 1880 Frankfurt (5th title)
- Relegated: none

The 2007-08 Rugby-Bundesliga was the 37th edition of this competition and the 88th edition of the German rugby union championship. The season went from 25 August 2007 to 31 May 2008, ending with the relegation final.

== Overview ==
Location of teams in the Rugby-Bundesliga 2007-08

In 2007-08, eight teams played a home-and-away season with a final between the top two teams at the end, which was won by the SC 1880 Frankfurt. It was the club's fifth German title and its first in 83 years, having last won it in 1925. It was a rematch of the 2006-07 final, also played in Frankfurt am Main, which SC 1880 had lost to Heidelberg 15-23. Alongside the national championship final, the 2nd Bundesliga final was played as a curtain raiser for the game.

Last placed RK Heusenstamm would have been relegated but the league was expanded to nine teams for 2008-09 and no team had to drop down to the 2nd Bundesliga. This was decided on 19 July 2008 at the annual meeting of the German rugby association. The decision was made to expand the league to ten teams for the 2009-10 season.

Nominally, the eight placed team in the league would be relegated while the seventh placed team had to play the loser of the 2nd Bundesliga final for one more league place. The 2nd Bundesliga champion is directly promoted, which was the RK 03 Berlin in 2008.

The 2007-08 final was sponsored by the French bank Société Générale. It was not broadcast live on television but the Deutsches Sportfernsehen showed one hour of highlights the following Monday.

== Bundesliga table ==
	Club	Played	Won	Drawn	Lost	Points for	Points against	Difference	Points
1	SC 1880 Frankfurt	14	12	0	2	561	195	366	38
2	RG Heidelberg	14	9	1	4	490	242	248	33
3	TSV Handschuhsheim	14	9	1	4	276	276	0	33
4	Berliner RC	14	7	0	7	301	340	-39	30
5	SC Neuenheim	14	4	3	7	204	236	-32	25
6	Heidelberger RK	14	4	3	7	228	274	-46	25
7	DRC Hannover	14	4	0	10	228	410	-182	22
8	RK Heusenstamm	14	3	0	11	241	556	-315	20

- Relegated: none
- Promoted: RK 03 Berlin

== Bundesliga results ==
=== Results table ===
Club	SCF	RGH	TSV	BRC	SCN	HRK	DRC	RKH
SC 1880 Frankfurt	—	35-32	78-3	20-17	15-28	24-6	56-19	65-10
RG Heidelberg	16-19	—	44-16	33-8	35-3	26-32	83-23	43-12
TSV Handschuhsheim	24-26	18-25	—	28-11	12-6	27-8	16-0	25-15
Berliner RC	7-84	28-23	15-20	—	18-6	24-13	19-12	61-24
SC Neuenheim	0-21	15-15	3-6	8-21	—	3-3	21-13	47-12
Heidelberger RK	9-34	6-28	15-15	36-26	9-9	—	22-3	25-26
DRC Hannover	14-11	20-41	25-28	23-20	23-25	13-7	—	20-15
RK Heusenstamm	10-73	7-46	5-38	10-26	33-30	16-37	46-20	—

==== Key ====
Home win	Draw	Away win	Game not played

=== Round 1 ===
2007-08-25
14:30

DRC Hannover	20 – 15	RK Heusenstamm

Referee: Scharmann

2007-08-25
15:00

TSV Handschuhsheim	28 – 11	Berliner Rugby Club

Referee: Roberts

2007-08-25
17:00

SC Frankfurt 1880	15 – 28	SC Neuenheim

Referee: Tietge

2007-08-26
15:00

RG Heidelberg	26 – 32	Heidelberger RK

Referee: Reinecke

=== Round 2 ===
2007-09-01
14:30

Berliner Rugby Club	28 – 23	RG Heidelberg

Referee: Tietge

2007-09-01
15:00

RK Heusenstamm	5 – 38	TSV Handschuhsheim

Referee: Roberts

2007-09-02
16:30

Heidelberger RK	9 – 34	SC Frankfurt 1880

Referee: Pangritz

2007-12-01
14:30

SC Neuenheim	21 – 13	DRC Hannover

Referee: Roberts

=== Round 3 ===
2007-09-08
15:00

SC Frankfurt 1880	20 – 17	Berliner Rugby Club

Referee: Tietge

2007-09-08
15:00

RG Heidelberg	43 – 12	RK Heusenstamm

Referee: Scharmann

2007-10-03
14:30

DRC Hannover	25 – 28	TSV Handschuhsheim

Referee: Hirabayashi

2007-09-19
19:00

SC Neuenheim	3 – 3	Heidelberger RK

Referee: Lucas

=== Round 4 ===
2007-09-15
15:00

Berliner Rugby Club	18 – 6	SC Neuenheim

Referee: Scheuerlein

2007-09-15
15:00

RK Heusenstamm	10 – 73	SC Frankfurt 1880

Referee: Waite

2007-09-16
14:30

TSV Handschuhsheim	18 – 25	RG Heidelberg

Referee: Tietge

2008-04-12
16:30

Heidelberger RK	22 – 3	DRC Hannover

Referee: Scharmann

=== Round 5 ===
2007-09-22
14:30

SC Frankfurt 1880	78 – 3	TSV Handschuhsheim

Referee: Ljungdahl

2007-09-22
14:30

DRC Hannover	20 – 41	RG Heidelberg

Referee: Scharmann

2007-09-22
15:00

Heidelberger RK	36 – 26	Berliner Rugby Club

Referee: Himmer

2007-10-03
14:30

SC Neuenheim	47 – 12	RK Heusenstamm

Referee: Himmer

=== Round 6 ===
2007-10-03
16:30

RG Heidelberg	16 – 19	SC Frankfurt 1880

Referee: Reinecke

2007-10-06
15:00

RK Heusenstamm	16 – 37	Heidelberger RK

Referee: Ljungdahl

2007-10-07
17:00

TSV Handschuhsheim	12 – 6	SC Neuenheim

Referee: Reinecke

2008-02-23
14:30

DRC Hannover	23 – 20	Berliner Rugby Club

Referee: Roberts

=== Round 7 ===
2007-10-13
15:00

SC Neuenheim	15 – 15	RG Heidelberg

Referee: Frederking

2007-10-13
16:30

SC Frankfurt 1880	56 – 19	DRC Hannover

Referee: Tietge

2007-10-14
14:00

Berliner Rugby Club	61 – 24	RK Heusenstamm

Referee: Reinecke

2007-10-14
15:00

Heidelberger RK	15 – 15	TSV Handschuhsheim

Referee: Teagarden

=== Round 8 ===
2007-11-17
14:30

Berliner Rugby Club	15 – 20	TSV Handschuhsheim

Referee: Scharmann

2007-11-17
15:00

Heidelberger RK	6 – 28	RG Heidelberg

Referee: Pangritz

2007-11-17
15:00

RK Heusenstamm	46 – 20	DRC Hannover

Referee: Scheuerlein

2007-11-18
15:00

SC Neuenheim	0 – 21	SC Frankfurt 1880

Referee: Roberts

=== Round 9 ===
2008-03-08
14:30

RG Heidelberg	33 – 8	Berliner Rugby Club

Referee: Himmer

2008-03-08
14:30

DRC Hannover	23 – 25	SC Neuenheim

Referee: Tietge

2008-03-08
16:30

SC Frankfurt 1880	24 – 6	Heidelberger RK

Referee: Frederking

2008-03-09
14:30

TSV Handschuhsheim	25 – 15	RK Heusenstamm

Referee: Reinecke

=== Round 10 ===
2008-03-15
14:30

Berliner Rugby Club	7 – 84	SC Frankfurt 1880

Referee: Himmer

2008-03-15
14:30

TSV Handschuhsheim	16 – 0	DRC Hannover

Referee: Ljungdahl

2008-03-15
16:30

RK Heusenstamm	7 – 46	RG Heidelberg

Referee: Scheuerlein

2008-03-16
14:30

Heidelberger RK	9 – 9	SC Neuenheim

Referee: Reinecke

=== Round 11 ===
2008-03-29
14:30

SC Neuenheim	8 – 21	Berliner Rugby Club

Referee: Roberts

2008-03-29
14:30

DRC Hannover	13 – 7	Heidelberger RK

Referee: Scharmann

2008-03-30
15:00

RG Heidelberg	44 – 16	TSV Handschuhsheim

Referee: Himmer

2008-04-30
19:30

SC Frankfurt 1880	65 – 10	RK Heusenstamm

Referee: Roberts

=== Round 12 ===
2008-04-05
14:30

Berliner Rugby Club	24 – 13	Heidelberger RK

Referee: Ljungdahl

2008-04-05
14:30

RG Heidelberg	83 – 23	DRC Hannover

Referee: Roberts

2008-04-05
15:00

RK Heusenstamm	33 – 30	SC Neuenheim

Referee: Himmer

2008-04-06
14:30

TSV Handschuhsheim	24 – 26	SC Frankfurt 1880

Referee: Tietge

=== Round 13 ===
2008-05-10
14:30

Berliner Rugby Club	19 – 12	DRC Hannover

Referee: Scharmann

2008-05-10
15:00

SC Frankfurt 1880	35 – 32	RG Heidelberg

Referee: Himmer

2008-05-10
16:30

Heidelberger RK	25 – 26	RK Heusenstamm

Referee: Forstmeyer

2008-05-11
15:00

SC Neuenheim	3 – 6	TSV Handschuhsheim

Referee: Tietge

=== Round 14 ===
2008-05-17
15:00

DRC Hannover	14 – 11	SC Frankfurt 1880

Referee: Tietge

2008-05-17
15:00

RG Heidelberg	35 – 3	SC Neuenheim

Referee: Himmer

2008-05-17
15:00

TSV Handschuhsheim	27 – 8	Heidelberger RK

Referee: Blank

2008-05-17
15:00

RK Heusenstamm	10 – 26	Berliner Rugby Club

Referee: Roberts

== Promotion/relegation play-off ==
=== 2nd Bundesliga final ===
2008-05-24
13:00

ASV Köln Rugby	6 – 22	RK 03 Berlin
	(Report) (in German)

Frankfurt am Main
Attendance: 2,500
Referee: Himmer

=== Relegation match ===
2008-05-31
18:00

ASV Köln Rugby	3 – 52	DRC Hannover
	(Report) (in German)

Heusenstamm
Referee: Werner Cromm

== Final ==
2008-05-24
15:30

SC Frankfurt 1880	28 – 13	RG Heidelberg
Tries: Nordstrom; Pen: Kupa (7); Con: Kupa	(Report) (in German)	Tries: Dinha; Pen: Werle, Güngör; Con: Werle

Sportanlage an der Feldgerichtstrasse, Frankfurt am Main
Attendance: 2,500
Referee: Tietge

SC 1880 FRANKFURT:
Russel Kupa
Zane Gardener
Marcus Seuseu
Zion Nordstrom
Bevan Gray
Jason Campell
Api Matenga
Aaron Satchwell
Andrew Porter
Sam Henderson
Rodrigo Eleter
Corey Read
Bill Gadolo
Jared Brook
Ralph Klinghammer
Substitutes:
Daniel Preussner
Mark Wasson
Rolf Wacha
Daniel Cünzer
Dennis Feidelberg
Stefan Kunde
Conrad Dent
Coach:
(New Zealand) Phil Stevenson

RG HEIDELBERG:
Edmoore Takaendesa
Christoph Werle
Sebastien Chaule
Holger Wüst
Steffen Thier
Patrick Schachner
Mustafa Güngör
Costa Dinha
Jeff Tigere
Tim Kasten
Sebastian Werle
Manuel Wilhelm
Miguel Bleickert
Kehoma Brenner
Mohammad Kabir
Substitutes:
Falk Schmitt
Christoph Hug
Armin Ergert
Nemedin Collaku
Oliver Stock
Christopher Müller
Jan Bratschke
Coach:
(Germany) Rudolf Finsterer

== 2nd Bundesliga tables ==
=== South/West ===
	Club	Played	Won	Drawn	Lost	Points for	Points against	Difference	Points
1	ASV Köln Rugby	16	12	2	2	484	118	366	41
2	Stuttgarter RC	16	13	1	2	339	190	149	39
3	TSV Handschuhsheim II	16	10	0	6	377	276	101	35
4	SC 1880 Frankfurt II	16	8	1	7	415	245	170	33
5	München RFC	16	7	2	7	261	282	-21	31
6	StuSta München	16	5	1	10	238	405	-167	27
7	Heidelberger TV	16	5	0	11	253	377	-124	26
8	RG Heidelberg II	16	5	0	11	274	440	-166	25
9	RC Mainz	16	3	1	12	133	441	-308	23

- Promoted to Bundesliga: none
- Relegated from Bundesliga: none
- Relegated from 2nd Bundesliga: none
- Promoted to 2nd Bundesliga: Heidelberger RK II

=== North/East ===
	Club	Played	Won	Drawn	Lost	Points for	Points against	Difference	Points
1	RK 03 Berlin	16	14	0	2	714	158	556	44
2	TSV Victoria Linden	16	12	0	4	527	232	295	40
3	FC St Pauli Rugby	16	11	0	5	554	300	254	38
4	DSV 78/08 Ricklingen	16	10	0	6	504	265	239	36
5	SC Germania List	16	8	0	8	313	337	-24	32
6	SV Odin Hannover	16	7	1	8	280	306	-26	29
7	USV Potsdam	16	6	1	9	350	503	-153	27
8	Hamburger RC	16	2	0	14	137	556	-419	20
9	Berliner SV 92 Rugby	16	1	0	15	97	819	-722	18

- Promoted to Bundesliga: RK 03 Berlin
- Relegated from Bundesliga: none
- Relegated from 2nd Bundesliga: none
- Promoted to 2nd Bundesliga: RU Hohen Neuendorf, SG Schwalbe/DRC Hannover II
