= Guillaume Franke =

Germany international rugby union player

- Born: Guillaume Franke; 27 October 1987 (age 39)
- Height: 1.91 m (6 ft 3 in)
- Weight: 93 kg (14 st 9 lb)

Rugby union career
- Position: Wing
Senior career
Years	Team	Apps	(Points)
	RC Orléans	54	(210)
- Correct as of 30 April 2012
International career
Years	Team	Apps	(Points)
2010 - present	Germany	3	(8)
- Correct as of 8 April 2012

Guillaume Franke (born 27 October 1987) is a German international rugby union player, playing for RC Orléans in the Fédérale 1 and the German national rugby union team. He is the brother of Matthieu Franke, who has also played for Germany.

Franke made his debut for Germany against Georgia on 7 February 2010, replacing his brother after he had to withdraw with a knee injury.

Franke's club, RC Orléans, provided, in the past, a number of players to the German team, including him, his brother, Clemens von Grumbkow and Alexander Widiker.

== Stats ==
Guillaume Franke's personal statistics in club and international rugby:

=== Club ===
Year	Team	Competition	Games	Points	Place
2007-08	RC Orléans	Fédérale 1	1	0	
2008-09	RC Orléans	Fédérale 1	10	55	
2009-10	RC Orléans	Fédérale 1	20	76	
2010-11	RC Orléans	Fédérale 1	19	74	
2011-12	RC Orléans	Fédérale 1	4	5	

- As of 30 April 2012

=== National team ===
Year	Team	Competition	Games	Points	Place
2008-2010	Germany	European Nations Cup First Division	1	0	6th — Relegated
2010–2012	Germany	European Nations Cup Division 1B	2	8	4th

- As of 8 April 2012
