= Fabian Heimpel =

Fabian (FH6) Heimpel
- Born: Fabian Heimpel; 21 August 1990 (age 36)
- Height: 1.78 m (5 ft 10 in)
- Weight: 86 kg (13 st 8 lb)

Rugby union career
- Position: Fly-half
Senior career
Years	Team	Apps	(Points)
2011	Heidelberg		
2011	UCT RFC		
2011 - present	Heidelberg	15	(131)
- Correct as of 30 April 2012
International career
Years	Team	Apps	(Points)
2010–	Germany	10	(72)
- Correct as of 8 April 2012
National sevens team
Years	Team		Comps
2009–	Germany 7s		

Fabian Heimpel (born 21 August 1990) is a German international rugby union player, playing for the University of Cape Town RFC and the German national rugby union team.

== Biography ==
Heimpel made his debut for Germany against Portugal on 27 February 2010. He has also played for the Germany's 7's side in the past, like at the 2009 Hannover Sevens.

Heimpel was top scorer of the Rugby-Bundesliga in 2009–10, with 225 points. At the end of the 2010–11 season, Heimpel, together with his friend Florian Wehrspann, moved to South Africa for a year, to join University of Cape Town RFC, a team the former German international Bodo Sieber used to play for, but opted to return to Germany early.

Heimpel was one of four German rugby players, together with Mustafa Güngör, Raphael Pyrasch and Bastian Himmer, who were promised by the DRV that they could join the Sportkompanie of the Bundeswehr, a special sports unit within the German Army. This was, however, not the case, with no places available in the unit for male rugby players until 2012. This led to great resentment by the players towards the DRV and its then-chairman Claus-Peter Bach because all four had turned down other options in favour of the promised place in the Sportkompanie. Heimpel subsequently opted out of military service altogether and chose civilian service instead.

Heimpel competed for Germany at the 2022 Rugby World Cup Sevens in Cape Town.

== Honours ==
=== Club ===
- German sevens championship
  - Champions: 2009

=== Personal ===
- Rugby-Bundesliga
  - Top scorer: 2009–10

May 2018- September 2018 Vice European Champion Grand Prix Series Moscow, Exteter, Marcoussis and Lodz - August 2018 German Champions 7's, Heusenstamm - April 2018 World Series Qualifier 7's, Hong Kong (finalist) - September 2017 Oktoberfest 7's, Munich - July 2017 German Champions 7's, Heidelberg - June 2017 - July 2017 European Grand Prix Series Moscow, Exteter, Clermont and Lodz) - April 2017 World Series Qualifier 7's, Hong Kong (finalist) - June 2016 - September 2016 European Grand Prix Series Moscow, Exeter, Gdansk) - July 2016 German Champions 7's, Heidelberg - June 2016 Olympic Qualification Repechage, Monaco - July 2015 German Champions 7's, Heusenstamm - June 2015 - July 2015 European Championship Grand Prix Series Moscow, Bucharest, Manchester and Lyon - June 2014- July 2014 European Championship Grand Prix Series Moscow, Bucharest, Manchester and Lyon - June 2013 - July 2013 European Championship Grand Prix Series Bucharest, Lyon - June 2012 - July 2012 European Championship Grand Prix Series Lyon, Moscow, Odense - July 2011 Promotion from B Division to Grand Prix Series - July 2009 European Championships Hanover 7's (debut) - July 2009 German Champion 7's, Heusenstamm - July 2008 German Champion 7's, Heusenstamm

== Stats ==
Fabian Heimpel's personal statistics in club and international rugby:

=== Club ===
Year	Club	Division	Games	Tries	Con	Pen	DG	Place
2008–09	RG Heidelberg	Rugby-Bundesliga	15	0	26	25	1	5th
2009–10	RG Heidelberg	Rugby-Bundesliga	17	6	46	33	1	2nd — Semi-finals
2010–11	RG Heidelberg	Rugby-Bundesliga	16	5	35	24	0	4th — Semi-finals
2011	University of Cape Town RFC							
2011–12	RG Heidelberg	Rugby-Bundesliga	15	1	24	26	0	6th

- As of 30 April 2012

=== National team ===
==== European Nations Cup ====
Year	Team	Competition	Games	Points	Place
2008–2010	Germany	European Nations Cup First Division	2	7	6th — Relegated
2010–2012	Germany	European Nations Cup Division 1B	7	46	4th

==== Friendlies and other competitions ====
Year	Team	Competition	Games	Points
2010	Germany	Friendly	1	19

- As of 8 April 2012
