= Arthur Zeiler =

- Born: Arthur Zeiler; 25 March 1988 (age 38)
- Height: 1.80 m (5 ft 11 in)
- Weight: 120 kg (18 st 13 lb; 265 lb)

Rugby union career
- Position: Prop
Senior career
Years	Team	Apps	(Points)
1994–2003 2004–present	TBR		
–	HRK		
International career
Years	Team	Apps	(Points)
2010–	Germany	16	(0)
- Correct as of 4 December 2013

Arthur Zeiler (born 25 March 1988) is a German international rugby union player, playing for the Heidelberger RK in the Rugby-Bundesliga and the German national rugby union team.

Zeiler played in the 2009, 2010, 2011 and 2012 German championship final for Heidelberger RK, losing the first one and winning the following three.

He made his debut for Germany in an ENC match against Poland on 20 November 2010.

Zeiler began his rugby career in 1994 and has since played for TB Rohrbach and the HRK.

== Honours ==
=== Club ===
- German rugby union championship
  - Champions: 2010, 2011, 2012, 2013
  - Runners up: 2009
- German rugby union cup
  - Winners: 2011

== Stats ==
Arthur Zeiler's personal statistics in club and international rugby:

=== Club ===
Year	Club	Division	Games	Tries	Con	Pen	DG	Place
2008-09	Heidelberger RK	Rugby-Bundesliga	14	0	0	0	0	2nd — Runners-up
2009-10	Heidelberger RK	Rugby-Bundesliga	18	0	0	0	0	3rd — Runners-up
2010-11	Heidelberger RK	Rugby-Bundesliga	15	3	0	0	0	1st — Champions
2011-12	Heidelberger RK	Rugby-Bundesliga	19	3	0	0	0	1st — Champions
2012-13	Heidelberger RK	Rugby-Bundesliga						1st — Champions
2013-14	Heidelberger RK	Rugby-Bundesliga						

- As of 4 December 2013

=== National team ===
==== European Nations Cup ====
Year	Team	Competition	Games	Points	Place
2010–2012	Germany	European Nations Cup Division 1B	8	0	4th
2012–2014	Germany	European Nations Cup Division 1B	7	0	ongoing

==== Friendlies & other competitions ====
Year	Team	Competition	Games	Points
2010	Germany	Friendly	1	0

- As of 4 December 2013
