= Heidelberger RK =

German rowing & rugby union club, based in Heidelberg

(Germany) Heidelberger RK - Rugby
- Full name: Heidelberger Ruderklub 1872 e.V.
- Union: German Rugby Federation
- Founded: 9 May 1872; 154 years ago
- Location: Heidelberg, Germany
- Ground: Sportgelände an der Speyererstraße (Capacity: 1,500)
- Chairman: Peter Jeffs
- League: Rugby-Bundesliga
- 2018–19: Rugby-Bundesliga South/West, 4th
Team kit

Official website
- hrk1872.de

The Heidelberger Ruderklub (Heidelberger RK or HRK for short) is a German rowing club and German rugby union clubs from Heidelberg, currently playing in the Rugby-Bundesliga.

The club is one of four professional rugby clubs in Germany. The turn to professionalism in a sport otherwise fully amateur in Germany was made possible through the support of Hans-Peter Wild, who owns a soft drink manufacturing business.

Heidelberger RK was to become the first German club to take part in either of the two major European rugby union competitions after they qualified for the 2018-19 European Rugby Challenge Cup via winning their semi-final against Timișoara Saracens in the 2017-18 European Rugby Continental Shield. European Professional Club Rugby announced that Heidelberger would be excluded as they were under the ownership of Wild, who was simultaneously the owner of another Challenge Cup side, Stade Français Paris.

Following the decision, Wild announced he was withdrawing support for the club.

== History ==
The club's origins date back to 1872, when, on 9 May, the Deutschen Flaggen-Club Heidelberg was formed, a rowing club. In the early days, several rowing clubs were formed in Heidelberg and disappeared again, but the remaining ones merged in 1875 to form the Heidelberger Ruderclub, under the leadership of the Flaggen-Club.

The game of rugby was introduced in the club in the early 1890s by Edward Hill Ullrich, who was partly of English descend and had a great love of "English" games, translating the rules of rugby into German. It is from this beginnings that the HRK claims to be the oldest rugby club in Germany. This is true in the sense that it is the oldest rugby-playing club in Germany but other clubs have an older rugby department.

The club had a golden era in the late 1920s, when it reached the German championship final three years in a row, winning the title in 1927 and 1928.

After years of stagnation and a lack of home ground, the HRK formed a youth department and moved to the Sportgelände an der Speyererstraße in 1961, which is still its current home. This development soon bore fruit and the club earned three championships in the 1970s, also qualifying for the new Rugby-Bundesliga in 1971. The club continued to be a force in German rugby well into the 80's, earning its last championship in 1986.

After a period of decline, it found itself in the 2nd Rugby-Bundesliga, where it was promoted from back to the first division in 1997. After a short stint in this league, the team had to return to the 2nd Bundesliga in 2000, where it was to remain for the next couple of seasons.

The club dominated the 2nd Bundesliga South/West in 2004-05, winning all 16 regular season games, the largest win being a 146-5 victory over BSC Offenbach. In the final against the North/East champion DSV 78/08 Ricklingen, an 18-6 victory meant promotion back to the Bundesliga.

Since then, the club has existed as a lower table side in the league, sitting just above the relegation zone. In 2008-09, the club's performance has much improved and a second place saw the team return to the German finals for the first time in over 20 years. In the semi-finals, the club beat SC Neuenheim, to reach its first national championship final since 1986, where it narrowly lost 11-8 to SC 1880 Frankfurt. The following season, HRK finished third in the league but reached the final once more, this time defeating SC 1880 39-22 in extra time, to earn its first national championship since 1986. It repeated this achievement in 2010-11 when it defeated Frankfurt once more in a closely fought final, winning 12-9. Having won the men's national cup and sevens championship as well as the national championship and sevens championship with the women's, the HRK took out all five available national titles in 2010-11.

In 2011-12, the club also took part in the North Sea Cup, a European Cup competition made up of two clubs each from Belgium, Germany and the Netherlands. The club once more finished top of the table in the league in 2011-12, losing only one of its 18 games, reaching the final for a fourth consecutive time, but facing TV Pforzheim there rather than SC 1880 Frankfurt, its opposition in the previous three finals. HRK won the final 20-16 and won its ninth German championship.

In the 2012–13 season the club took part in the European Clubs Championship, a new competition, on the strength of its North Sea Cup runners-up finish in the previous year, facing the Croatian champions RK Nada in the semi-finals, which HRK won 43–0. The club consequently qualified for the final against Lithuanian club RC Šiauliai who had knocked out SC 1880 in the semi-finals, winning this game and the competition 60–10. The European Clubs Championship is open to the winners of the Baltic and Balkan Cups as well as the winners and runners-up of the North Sea Cup.

HRK finished first in their group in the 2012-13 season and qualified for the south/west division of the championship round, where it also came first. The club won its fourth consecutive German championship defeating SC Neuenheim 41-10 in the final. In the North Sea Cup the club reached the final where it defeated Belgian club Boitsfort Rugby Club 34-10 to take out the competition for the first time.

The club remained unbeaten during the 2013–14 regular season, finishing first in the south-west championship round, receiving a bye for the first round of the play-offs and advancing to the finals after victories over RK 03 Berlin and Berliner RC. Heidelberg won its fifth consecutive title when it defeated TV Pforzheim 43–20 in Pforzheim.

In the 2014–15 season the club once again remained unbeaten and finished first in the south-west championship group once more. It defeated TV Pforzheim in the final of the German championship after play-off wins over TSV Handschuhsheim and RG Heidelberg. HRK thereby equaled Victoria Linden's record of six consecutive German championships.

In 2015–16 Heidelberger RK participated in the European Rugby Challenge Cup Qualifying Competition, competing against Grupo Desportivo Direito, Mogliano Rugby, Royal Kituro Rugby Club and Timișoara Saracens for a place in the 2016–17 European Rugby Challenge Cup. After two away wins the club played its first home game against Belgian side Kituro, which it won, thereby also opening its new home ground which has an artificial turf surface. Heidelberg lost its final game of the competition to Timișoara and was eliminated. In the Bundesliga Heidelberg completed the regular season unbeaten and defeated SC Germania List in the play-off semi-finals but suffered a surprise 41–36 defeat to TV Pforzheim in the final. Two further title wins ensued, 2017 against TV Pforzheim and 2018 against RG Heidelberg. The regular season 2018-2019 was concluded by clinching the third place and as the only side beating the 2019 national champion SC 1880 Frankfurt in a league game.

== Reserve and women's team ==
The club's reserve side has played for many years in the league below, the 2nd Bundesliga South/West, but stepped down to the third level for 2012–13.

The club also has a successful women's team, which plays at the highest level in Germany, the Women's Rugby Bundesliga, but it took the team until 2010 to win a national championship at this level. Since then the clubs women's team has won five consecutive national championships from 2010 to 2014. It has however won the national sevens championship in the past.

== Club honours ==
=== Men ===
- European Rugby Continental Shield
  - Runners up: 2018
- German rugby union championship
  - Champions: 1927, 1928, 1971, 1973, 1976, 1986, 2010, 2011, 2012, 2013, 2014, 2015, 2017, 2018
  - Runners up: 1929, 1975, 1977, 1981, 1985, 2009, 2016
- German rugby union cup
  - Winner: 1973, 1976, 2011
  - Runners up: 2003
- German sevens championship
  - Champions: 2011, 2013, 2014
  - Runners up: 2012, 2015
- 2nd Rugby-Bundesliga
  - Champions: 1997, 2005
- North Sea Cup
  - Champions: 2013
  - Runners up: 2012

=== Women ===
- German rugby union championship
  - Champions: 2010, 2011, 2012, 2013, 2014, 2015, 2016
  - Runners up: 2007, 2009
- German sevens championship
  - Champions: 2006, 2008, 2009, 2011, 2012, 2013
  - Runners-up: 2014, 2016

== Recent seasons ==
=== Men: First team ===
Recent seasons of the club:

Year	Division	Position
1997-98	Rugby-Bundesliga (I)	8th
1998-99	Rugby-Bundesliga South/West	5th
1998-99	Bundesliga qualification round	3rd
1999–2000	Rugby-Bundesliga South/West	5th
1999–2000	Bundesliga qualification round	5th — Relegated
2000-01	2nd Rugby-Bundesliga South/West (II)	5th
2000-01	2nd Rugby-Bundesliga South/West qualification round	1st
2001-02	2nd Rugby-Bundesliga South/West	3rd
2002-03	2nd Rugby-Bundesliga South/West	2nd
2003-04	2nd Rugby-Bundesliga South/West	2nd
2004-05	2nd Rugby-Bundesliga South/West	1st — Promoted
2005-06	Rugby-Bundesliga (I)	6th
2006-07	Rugby-Bundesliga	7th
2007-08	Rugby-Bundesliga	6th
2008-09	Rugby-Bundesliga	2nd — Runners up
2009–10	Rugby-Bundesliga	3rd — Champions
2010–11	Rugby-Bundesliga	1st — Champions
2011–12	Rugby-Bundesliga	1st — Champions
2012–13	Rugby-Bundesliga qualification round – South	1st
2012–13	Rugby-Bundesliga championship round – South-West	1st — Champions
2013–14	Rugby-Bundesliga qualification round – South	1st
2013–14	Rugby-Bundesliga championship round – South-West	1st — Champions
2014–15	Rugby-Bundesliga qualification round – South	1st
2014–15	Rugby-Bundesliga championship round – South-West	1st — Champions
2015–16	Rugby-Bundesliga South-West	1st — Runners up

- Until 2001, when the single-division Bundesliga was established, the season was divided in autumn and spring, a Vorrunde and Endrunde, whereby the top teams of the Rugby-Bundesliga would play out the championship while the bottom teams together with the autumn 2nd Bundesliga champion would play for Bundesliga qualification. The remainder of the 2nd Bundesliga teams would play a spring round to determine the relegated clubs. Where two placing's are shown, the first is autumn, the second spring. In 2012 the Bundesliga was expanded from ten to 24 teams and the 2nd Bundesliga from 20 to 24 with the leagues divided into four regional divisions.

=== Men: Reserve team ===
Year	Division	Position
2006–07	Rugby-Regionalliga (III)	2nd
2007–08	Rugby-Regionalliga	1st — Promoted
2008–09	2nd Rugby-Bundesliga South/West (II)	8th
2009–10	2nd Rugby-Bundesliga South/West	8th
2010–11	2nd Rugby-Bundesliga South/West	5th
2011–12	2nd Rugby-Bundesliga South/West	5th — Withdrawn
2012–13	3rd Liga South/West - West (III)	3rd
2013–14	inactive	
2014–15	3rd Liga South/West	2nd
2015–16	3rd Liga South/West—South	9th
2016–17	3rd Liga South/West—South	1st — Declined promotion

=== Women ===
Year	Division	Position
2004-05	Women's Rugby Bundesliga	5th
2005-06	Women's Rugby Bundesliga	3rd
2006–07	Women's Rugby Bundesliga	2nd — Runners up
2007–08	Women's Rugby Bundesliga	3rd
2008–09	Women's Rugby Bundesliga	2nd — Runners up
2009–10	Women's Rugby Bundesliga	1st — Champions
2010–11	Women's Rugby Bundesliga	1st — Champions
2011–12	Women's Rugby Bundesliga	1st — Champions
2012–13	Women's Rugby Bundesliga	1st — Champions
2013–14	Women's Rugby Bundesliga	3rd — Champions
2014–15	Women's Rugby Bundesliga	1st — Champions
2015–16	Women's Rugby Bundesliga	2nd — Champions

== Rugby internationals ==
In Germany's 2006–08 European Nations Cup campaign, no player from the club was called up for the national team.

In the 2008–10 campaign, Anjo Buckman, Christopher Liebig, Steffen Liebig, Patrick Schliwa and Tim Kasten were new additions to the club's list of internationals.

In the 2010–12 campaign, Raphael Pyrasch, Pieter Jordaan, Alexander Widiker, Arthur Zeiler, Daniel Armitage, Sean Armstrong and Kehoma Brenner were all new additions to the club's list of German internationals, while Patrick Schliwa, Anjo Buckman, Steffen Liebig and Tim Kasten appeared again.

For the opening match of the 2012–14 edition of the ENC against Ukraine Sean Armstrong, Anjo Buckman, Pieter Jordaan, Alexander Widiker, Arthur Zeiler, Steffen Liebig, Kehoma Brenner and Rafael Pyrasch where once more selected while Benjamin Danso, Raynor Parkinson and Samy Füchsel were new additions to the club's list of German internationals.

Felix Lammers marked his first regular season of international rugby with a try in the 18-26 defeat against Russia in Heidelberg on March 2, 2019 in week 3 of the 2019 Rugby Europe Championship.
