= Alexander Widiker =

German rugby union player

- Born: Alexander Widiker; 27 April 1982 (age 44) Kustanay, Kazakh SSR, Soviet Union
- Height: 1.72 m (5 ft 7 1/2 in)
- Weight: 110 kg (17 st 5 lb; 243 lb)

Rugby union career
- Position: Prop
Amateur team(s)
Years	Team	Apps	(Points)
- TB Rohrbach
–	SC Neuenheim		
Senior career
Years	Team	Apps	(Points)
2006–2010	RC Orléans	65	(35)
2010–	Heidelberger RK	33	(45)
International career
Years	Team	Apps	(Points)
2000–2015	Germany	59	

Alexander Widiker (born 27 April 1982) is a German international rugby union player, playing for Heidelberger RK in the Rugby-Bundesliga and, formerly, the German national rugby union team.

Widiker played in the 2011 and 2012 German championship final for Heidelberger RK, which the club both won, with Widiker scoring a try in the 2011 game.

Widiker is one of the few German players who has successfully played abroad. From 2006 to 2010, he played for the RC Orléans in the Fédérale 1, alongside two other German internationals, the brothers Matthieu and Guillaume Franke. In his last season with RCO he was also the team's captain.

== Biography ==
Widiker was born 27 April 1982 in Kustanay, Soviet Union (present day Kostanay, Kazakhstan), as one of three children, as an ethnic German. His parents, Friedrich and Emilia Widiker, are of Volga German descent. Widiker's grandparents were forcefully removed from the former Volga German Republic to the Kazakh SSR. When Widiker was eleven years old, his family moved to Germany. Initially, the family moved to Bramsche in Lower Saxony but was then allocated accommodation in Leipzig. Eventually, the family chose to move to Wiesloch, near Heidelberg.

Widiker, who played association football, ice hockey and basketball in Kazakhstan, only began playing rugby when going to school in Germany. He joined the TB Rohrbach, which later merged its youth team with the SC Neuenheim, where he made his debut in the senior team at the age of 17. He played for the German Under-17 and Under-19 team, taking part in two world championships, before making his debut for the senior side on 21 October 2001 against Sweden.

Before moving to France, Widiker, who has been playing rugby since 1994, won two German championships with his former club, SC Neuenheim, in 2003 and 2004.

Widiker was scheduled to return to Germany for the 2010–11 season to play for SC Neuenheim once more, but instead joint Heidelberger RK. He is also the new German captain, leading the team for the first time on 20 November 2010 against Poland.

With the final game against Moldova, Alexander Widiker played his 50th game for his country, thereby equaling Horst Kemmling's record of number of internationals for the DRV. He overtook Kemmling's record when he played his 51st game against Ukraine on 27 October 2012.

Widiker retired from international rugby after a record 58 games for Germany after a 76–12 win against the Czech Republic in April 2014, citing increased personal and business commitments as his reason. He however returned to the German team one more time in May in the decisive world cup qualifier against Russia which Germany lost.

== Honours ==
=== Club ===
- German rugby union championship
  - Champions: 2003, 2004, 2011, 2012, 2013
- German rugby union cup
  - Winners: 2001, 2011

=== National team ===
- European Nations Cup – Division 2
  - Champions: 2008

== Stats ==
Alexander Widiker's personal statistics in club and international rugby:

=== Club ===
Year	Team	Competition	Games	Points	Place
2006–07	RC Orléans	Fédérale 1	17	5	
2007–08	RC Orléans	Fédérale 1	10	5	
2008–09	RC Orléans	Fédérale 1	17	15	
2009–10	RC Orléans	Fédérale 1	21	10	
2010–11	Heidelberger RK	Rugby-Bundesliga	17	30	1st – Champions
2011–12	Heidelberger RK	Rugby-Bundesliga	16	15	1st – Champions
2012–13	Heidelberger RK	Rugby-Bundesliga			1st – Champions
2013–14	Heidelberger RK	Rugby-Bundesliga			

- Updated 4 December 2013

=== National team ===
==== European Nations Cup ====
Year	Team	Competition	Games	Points	Place
2006–2008	Germany	European Nations Cup Second Division	8	0	Champions
2008–2010	Germany	European Nations Cup First Division	10	0	6th – Relegated
2010–2012	Germany	European Nations Cup Division 1B	10	5	4th
2012–2014	Germany	European Nations Cup Division 1B	8	15	ongoing

==== Friendlies & other competitions ====
Year	Team	Competition	Games	Points
2007	Germany	Friendly	1	0
2008	Germany	Friendly	1	0
2010	Germany	Friendly	1	5

- Updated 24 April 2014
