= Steffen Liebig =

Germany international rugby union player

- Born: Steffen Liebig; 30 June 1989 (age 37)
- Height: 1.94 m (6 ft 4 in)
- Weight: 95 kg (14 st 13 lb)

Rugby union career
- Position: Wing
Senior career
Years	Team	Apps	(Points)
- HRK
International career
Years	Team	Apps	(Points)
2010 - present	Germany	26	(30)
- Correct as of 27 August 2018

Steffen Liebig (born 30 June 1989) is a German international rugby union player, playing for the Heidelberger RK in the Rugby-Bundesliga and the German national rugby union team.

Liebig played in the 2009, 2010, 2011 and 2012 German championship final for Heidelberger RK, losing the first one and winning the following three. He was one of four try scorers for HRK in the high-scoring 2010 final and also scored a try in the 2012 game.

He plays rugby since 1993. His brother, Christopher Liebig, is also a German international.

He made his debut for Germany against Georgia on 6 February 2010.

He was part of a group of German players which were sent to South Africa in 2009 to improve their rugby skills at the Sharks Academy as part of the Wild Rugby Academy program.

== Honours ==
=== Club ===
- German rugby union championship
  - Champions: 2010, 2011
  - Runners up: 2009
- German rugby union cup
  - Winners: 2011

== Stats ==
Steffen Liebig's personal statistics in club and international rugby:

=== Club ===
Year	Club	Division	Games	Tries	Con	Pen	DG	Place
2008-09	Heidelberger RK	Rugby-Bundesliga	10	7	1	0	0	2nd — Runners-up
2009-10	Heidelberger RK	Rugby-Bundesliga	15	5	0	0	0	3rd — Champions
2010-11	Heidelberger RK	Rugby-Bundesliga	17	11	42	2	0	1st — Champions
2011-12	Heidelberger RK	Rugby-Bundesliga	13	11	11	0	0	1st — Champions

- As of 11 May 2012

=== National team ===
==== European Nations Cup ====
Year	Team	Competition	Games	Points	Place
2008–2010	Germany	European Nations Cup First Division	1	0	6th — Relegated
2010–2012	Germany	European Nations Cup Division 1B	2	10	4th
2012–2014	Germany	European Nations Cup Division 1B	3	0	ongoing

==== Friendlies & other competitions ====
Year	Team	Competition	Games	Points
2010	Germany	Friendly	1	0

- As of 28 April 2013
