= Alexander Hug =

Alexander Hug may refer to:

- Alexander Hug (ski mountaineer) (born 1975), Swiss ski mountaineer
- Alexander Hug (rugby union) (born 1984), German international rugby union player
