= Sebastian Werle =

German rugby union player

- Born: Sebastian Werle; 23 December 1984 (age 41)
- Height: 1.96 m (6 ft 5 in)
- Weight: 115 kg (18 st 2 lb)
- Occupation: Electrician

Rugby union career
- Position: Lock
Amateur team(s)
Years	Team	Apps	(Points)
- RG Heidelberg
- Correct as of 25 March 2010
International career
Years	Team	Apps	(Points)
2007	Germany		
- Correct as of 25 March 2010

Sebastian Werle (born 23 December 1984) is a retired German international rugby union player, having last playing for the RG Heidelberg in the Rugby-Bundesliga and the German national rugby union team.

Werle has played rugby since 1988.

He made his last appearance for Germany against the Netherlands on 28 April 2007.

== Honours ==
=== Club ===
- German rugby union championship
  - Champions: 2006, 2007
  - Runners up: 2008

=== National team ===
- European Nations Cup - Division 2
  - Champions: 2008

== Stats ==
Sebastian Werle's personal statistics in club and international rugby:

=== Club ===
Year	Club	Division	Games	Tries	Con	Pen	DG	Place
2008-09	RG Heidelberg	Rugby-Bundesliga	1	0	0	0	0	5th
2009-10	RG Heidelberg	Rugby-Bundesliga	10	1	2	0	0	2nd — Semi-finals
2010-11	RG Heidelberg	Rugby-Bundesliga	6	0	0	0	0	4th — Semi-finals

- As of 30 April 2012

=== National team ===
==== European Nations Cup ====
Year	Team	Competition	Games	Points	Place
2006-2008	Germany	European Nations Cup Second Division	1	0	Champions

==== Friendlies & other competitions ====
Year	Team	Competition	Games	Points
2007	Germany	Friendly	1	0

- As of 25 March 2010
