= Ferdinand-Wilhelm Fricke =

German teacher & rugby union club founder (1863-1927)

Ferdinand Wilhelm Fricke
- Born: October 11, 1863; Hannover
- Died: January 17, 1927 (aged 63); Hannover
- Occupation: Teacher
- Known for: First Chairman of the German Rugby Federation

Ferdinand Wilhelm Fricke (October 11, 1863 – January 17, 1927) was a German teacher and, at the age of 15, founder of the Deutscher FV 1878 Hannover, the oldest rugby union club in Germany. Fricke was also the first chairman of the German Rugby Federation.

== Biography ==
F.W.F., as he was called throughout most of his life, was born on 11 October 1863 in Hannover, which was then the capital of the Kingdom of Hanover.

As a 15-year-old, in 1878, Fricke, as a member of the Realgymnasium in Hannover, like many of his school mates, watched English expatriates play rugby and association football in the English Hannover Football-Club.

F.W.F., as a leader of the pupils of the Realgymnasium, initiated the formation of a football club and, together with 24 other young men, he formed the Deutschen Fußball-Verein Hannover gegründet 1878, the oldest still existing rugby club in Germany.

In the following years, other local school clubs like the Hannoversche Schüler-Football-Club and Germania joined the club in an attempt to improve its strength and to be able to challenge the strong English sides in town. He remained chairman of the DFV 78 until 1898.

In 1896, Fricke was instrumental in the formation of Hannover 96, now the city's best-known football club. DFV 78 was only open to people of higher education at the time and he wanted to further the sport of rugby by opening it up to the masses as well as creating a club DFV could play against. Fricke donated a rugby ball and then held exercises with a number of local youth who then went on to form the Hannoversche Fußball-Club von 1896, upon his suggestion.

In 1899, Fricke discovered the ideal playing area for the club, Am Schnellen Graben, still its home ground today.

F.W.F., now 37 years old and vice dean of the Bürgerschule Meterstrasse in Hannover, was part of the formation of the Deutsche Rugby Verband, the German Rugby Federation, on 4 November 1900. He served as its first chairman until 1901 and again in 1904-05.

Ferdinand Wilhelm Fricke died on 17 January 1927, aged 63, in his hometown Hannover.

In 1957, the city of Hannover honoured Fricke by naming a street after him, the Ferdinand-Wilhelm-Fricke-Weg, where the club facilities of DSV 78 are, behind the AWD-Arena. It is also the seat of the German Rugby Federation, the DRV.

== Sources ==
- Die große Tat eines 15jährigen Penälers (in German) DSV 78 Hannover website - Article on F.W. Fricke
- Google book review: Hannoversches Biographisches Lexikon (in German) author: Dirk Böttcher, publisher: Schlütersche Verlagsgesellschaft, page: 122
