= Raphael Pyrasch =

Germany international rugby union player

Rafael Pyrasch
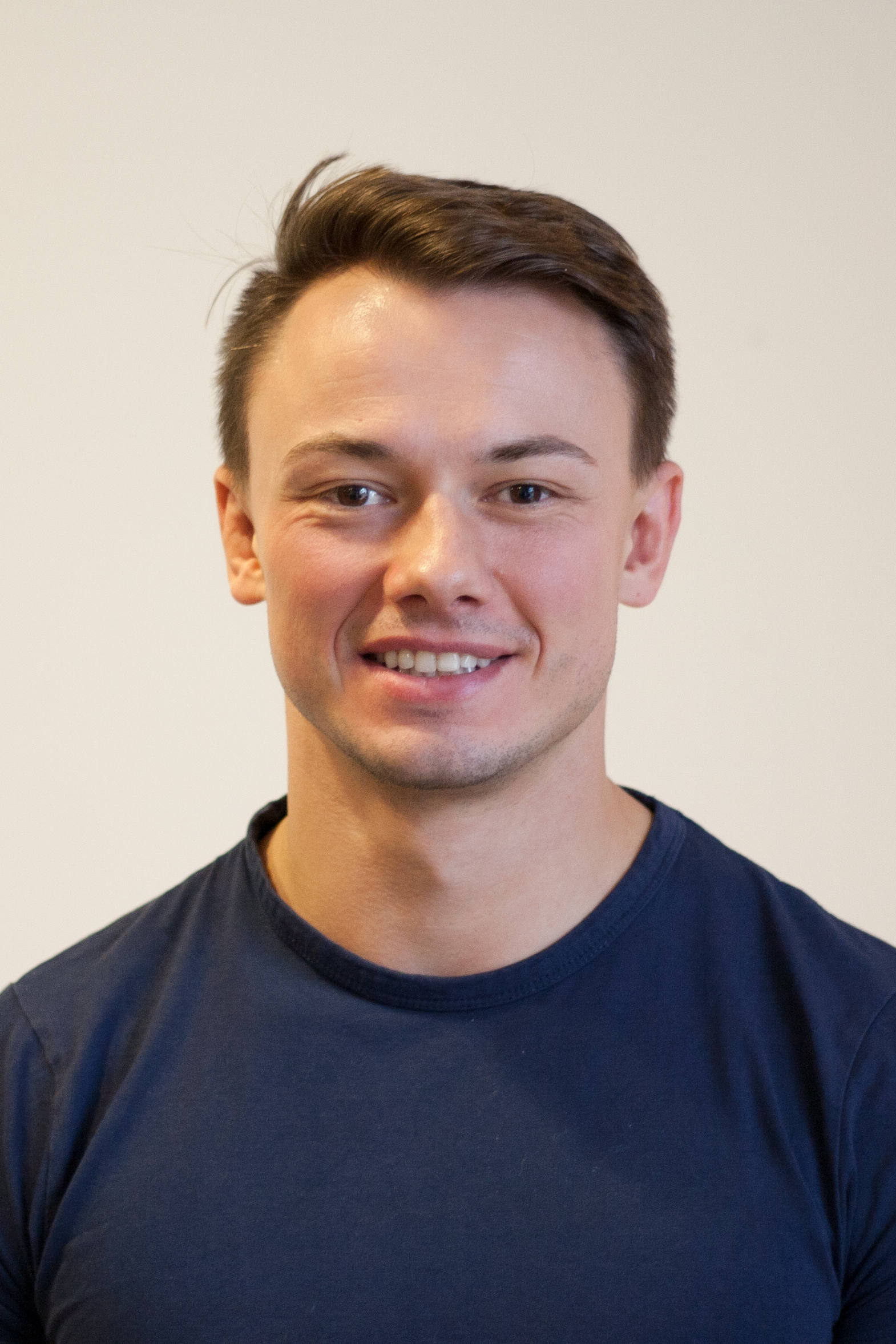
- Rafael Pyrasch in 2014
- Born: Rafael Pyrasch; 6 August 1986 (age 40)
- Height: 1.73 m (5 ft 8 in)
- Weight: 82 kg (12 st 13 lb)

Rugby union career
- Position: Wing
Senior career
Years	Team	Apps	(Points)
–	DSV 78		
2010 - present	HRK	92	(125)
- Correct as of 11 May 2012
International career
Years	Team	Apps	(Points)
2007 -	Germany	28	(35)
- Correct as of 27 August 2018
National sevens team
Years	Team		Comps
	Germany 7s		24

Rafael Pyrasch (born 6 August 1986) is a German international rugby union player, playing for the Heidelberger RK in the Rugby-Bundesliga and the German national rugby union team.

Pyrasch played in the 2011-2015 German championship final for Heidelberger RK, which the club won.

He made his debut for Germany against Switzerland in a friendly on 29 September 2007.

His club, DSV 78/08 Ricklingen, won the 2nd Bundesliga title in 2008-2009 and earned promotion to the Rugby-Bundesliga, now playing as DSV 78 Hannover.

Pyrasch has also played for the Germany's 7's side in the past, like at the 2009 Hannover Sevens and the 2009 London Sevens World Series.

Pyrasch (Staff Sergeant) got contracted by the German Army (Bundeswehr) 2010 to become a professional player in the Sports- Company to play Rugby 7s for Germany and to representing the German Army.

== Honours ==
=== Club ===
- German rugby union championship
  - Champions: 2011-2015 15s / 7s
  - Team of the Year 2011 HRK
  - North-sea Cup 2012 Winners
  - EPCR Cup Winners 2018
- German rugby union cup
  - Winners: 2011

== Stats ==
Rafael Pyrasch's personal statistics in club and international rugby:

=== Club ===
Year	Club	Division	Games	Tries	Con	Pen	DG	Place
2008-09	DSV 78/08 Ricklingen	2nd Rugby-Bundesliga	15	6	0	0	0	1st — Promoted
2009-10	DSV 78 Hannover	Rugby-Bundesliga EPCR CUP	7	1	0	0	0	9th
2010-2015	Heidelberger RK	Rugby-Bundesliga EPCR CUP	17	5	25	0	0	1st — Champions
2011-2018	Heidelberger RK	Rugby-Bundesliga EPCR CUP	9	0	0	0	0	1st — Champions

- As of 11 May 2012

=== National team ===
==== European Nations Cup ====
Year	Team	Competition	Games	Points	Place
2008-2010	Germany	European Nations Cup First Division	5	0	6th — Relegated
2010–2012	Germany	European Nations Cup Division 1B	2	0	4th
2012–2014	Germany	European Nations Cup Division 1B	2	0	1st — Promoted

==== Friendlies and other competitions ====
Year	Team	Competition	Games	Points
2007	Germany	Friendly	1	5
2008	Germany	Friendly	1	0
2010	Germany	Friendly	1	0

- As of 28 April 2013
