= RC Orléans =

French rugby union club, based in Orléans

(France) Orléans
- Full name: Rugby Club Orléans
- Founded: 1966; 60 years ago
- Location: Orléans, France
- Ground: Stade Marcel-Garcin (Capacity: 1,740)
- President: Marc Dumas and Philippe Dal Molin
- Coach: (France) Frédéric Austrui
- League: Nationale 2
- 2024–25: 2nd (Pool 2)

Rugby club Orléans is a semi-professional French rugby union team, from Orléans. They currently play in the Nationale 2 competition.

== German players ==
The club has recently provided a number of players for the Germany national rugby union team with Alexander Widiker and the brothers Guillaume and Matthieu Franke. Additionally, Frenchman Bruno Stolorz, a coach with the club, is also one of the two German coaches. Stolorz is provided to the German team by the Fédération française de rugby to improve Germany's performance in the sport. With Gilles Pagnon, another RCO player made his debut for Germany against Russia on 13 March 2010.

Clemens von Grumbkow, another German international, left the club in 2009 to join Rugby Club I Cavalieri Prato. In 2011, Olivier Galli was selected from the club to represent Germany.
