= RG Heidelberg =

German rugby union club, based in Heidelberg

(Germany) RG Heidelberg
- Full name: Rudergesellschaft Heidelberg 1898 e. V.
- Union: German Rugby Federation
- Founded: 4 June 1898; 127 years ago
- Location: Heidelberg, Germany
- Ground: Fritz-Grunebaum-Sportpark
- Chairman: Kai Nagel
- Coach: Gareth Jackson
- 2015–16: Rugby-Bundesliga South/West, 3rd
Team kit

Official website
- www.rgh-rugby.com

The RG Heidelberg (German: Rudergesellschaft Heidelberg, literally "Heidelberg Rowing Club") is a German rugby union club from Heidelberg, currently playing in the Rugby-Bundesliga. Apart from rugby, the club also offers the sport of rowing.

== History ==
The club was formed on 4 June 1898 as a rowing club. Out of necessity to have an alternative sport in winter, frozen rivers made rowing naturally impossible, the rugby department of the club was formed in 1919.

The RGH was the third rugby club to be formed in Heidelberg, after the Heidelberger RK and the SC Neuenheim, making it easy for the new team to find opposition to play against. The SC 1880 Frankfurt and the rugby department of the VfB Stuttgart were also teams the club played in its early years.

Due to many South Africans who were studying in Heidelberg, the club developed a good relationship with Dutch teams and eventually, the Dutch national colours, orange, became RGH's team colours, which they still are today.

In 1930, the club played in its first German rugby union championship final but lost to SV Odin Hannover 0-13. In 1932, 1933, 1937 and 1938 the RGH made four more losing appearances in the German championship final.

In 1959, the club appeared in another final, losing once more but in 1967 it finally won its first national title, winning the German rugby union cup. After another finals defeat in 1970 and the introduction of the Rugby-Bundesliga in 1971, the club formed its very successful youth department in 1972.

In 1980, the team finally won its first German title, followed by another three in 1997, 2006 and 2007. The 2006 final, the 86th in the competition's history, produced a novelty in the history of the game in Germany, with RGH and SC Neuenheim two clubs from Heidelberg competed for the title, for the first time. It was also the first time that no club from Hannover stood in the final.

In 1996, the club moved to its current home ground, the Fritz-Grunebaum-Sportpark.

While the club managed to upset SC 1880 Frankfurt in the 2007 German final, a repeat in the following season was not possible and the favorites from Frankfurt took out the title that year. After this, the club was unable to advance past the semi-final stage of the German championship.

On 22 August 2011, five days before the start of the season, the club withdrew its reserve team from the 2nd Rugby-Bundesliga South/West, citing inability to guarantee a full player squad for the whole season. Shortly after, the club announced that the team would instead compete in the tier-three 3rd Liga South/West in 2011-12.

RGH finished first in their group in the 2012-13 season and qualified for the south/west division of the championship round, where it also came first. The club advanced to the semi-finals of the play-offs where it was knocked out by SC Neuenheim, losing 18–32. In 2013–14 the team qualified for the championship and the play-offs once more, defeating TSV Victoria Linden 101–10 in the first round and losing to Berliner Rugby Club in the quarter-finals.

In the 2014–15 season the club finished fourth in the south-west championship group and was knocked out by Heidelberger RK in the semi-finals of the play-offs after victories over FC St. Pauli Rugby and RK 03 Berlin.

As of 2016 RG Heidelberg was the only club to have belonged to the Rugby-Bundesliga in every season since its interception.

On 20 July 2017, Prince William, Duke of Cambridge and Catherine, Duchess of Cambridge took the role of coxswains to race using RG Heidelberg boats from the Old Bridge in Heidelberg and the Theodor-Heuss Bridge (de).

== Club honours ==
- German rugby union championship
  - Champions: 1980, 1997, 2006, 2007
  - Runners up: 1930, 1932, 1933, 1937, 1938, 1959, 1970, 1982, 1983, 1996, 1999, 2008
- German rugby union cup
  - Winner: 1967, 1986, 1995, 1997, 2004
  - Runners up: 1974, 1975, 1977, 1980, 1982, 1990, 1996, 2006, 2007, 2008
- German sevens championship
  - Champions: 1997, 1998, 1999, 2003, 2005, 2008, 2009, 2015, 2016
  - Runners up: 1996, 2000, 2004, 2007, 2011

== Recent seasons ==
Recent seasons of the club:

=== Men: First team ===
Year	Division	Position
1997-98	Rugby-Bundesliga (I)	5th
1998-99	Rugby-Bundesliga South/West	3rd
1998-99	Bundesliga championship round	2nd
1999–2000	Rugby-Bundesliga South/West	3rd
1999–2000	Bundesliga championship round	5th
2000-01	Rugby-Bundesliga South/West	3rd
2000-01	Bundesliga championship round	3rd
2001-02	Rugby-Bundesliga	2nd
2002-03	Rugby-Bundesliga	4th
2003-04	Rugby-Bundesliga	3rd
2004-05	Rugby-Bundesliga	3rd
2005-06	Rugby-Bundesliga	1st — Champions
2006-07	Rugby-Bundesliga	2nd — Champions
2007-08	Rugby-Bundesliga	2nd — Runners up
2008-09	Rugby-Bundesliga	5th
2009–10	Rugby-Bundesliga	2nd — Semi-finals
2010–11	Rugby-Bundesliga	4th — Semi-finals
2011–12	Rugby-Bundesliga	6th
2012–13	Rugby-Bundesliga qualification round – South	3rd
2012–13	Rugby-Bundesliga championship round – South-West	3rd — Semi-finals
2013–14	Rugby-Bundesliga qualification round – South	4th
2013–14	Rugby-Bundesliga championship round – South-West	4th — Quarter-finals
2014–15	Rugby-Bundesliga qualification round – South	3rd
2014–15	Rugby-Bundesliga championship round – South-West	4th — Semi-finals
2015–16	Rugby-Bundesliga South-West	3rd

- Until 2001, when the single-division Bundesliga was established, the season was divided in autumn and spring, a Vorrunde and Endrunde, whereby the top teams of the Rugby-Bundesliga would play out the championship while the bottom teams together with the autumn 2nd Bundesliga champion would play for Bundesliga qualification. The remainder of the 2nd Bundesliga teams would play a spring round to determine the relegated clubs. Where two placing's are shown, the first is autumn, the second spring. In 2012 the Bundesliga was expanded from ten to 24 teams and the 2nd Bundesliga from 20 to 24 with the leagues divided into four regional divisions.

=== Men: Reserve team ===
Year	Division	Position
2001-02	Rugby-Regionalliga (III)	3rd
2002-03	Rugby-Regionalliga	2nd
2003-04	Rugby-Regionalliga	1st — Promoted
2004-05	2nd Rugby-Bundesliga South/West (II)	5th
2005-06	2nd Rugby-Bundesliga South/West	6th
2006-07	2nd Rugby-Bundesliga South/West	7th
2007–08	2nd Rugby-Bundesliga South/West	8th
2008–09	2nd Rugby-Bundesliga South/West	3rd
2009–10	2nd Rugby-Bundesliga South/West	4th
2010–11	2nd Rugby-Bundesliga South/West	8th — Withdrawn
2011–12	3rd Liga South/West - South (III)	2nd
2012–13	3rd Liga South/West - West	2nd — Semi-finals
2013–14	3rd Liga South/West – South	5th — Withdrawn
2014–15	3rd Liga South/West	3rd
2015–16	3rd Liga South/West—South	1st

== Rugby internationals ==
Mathias Entenmann, a lock and back rower, played 26 times for his country.

The former England international Phil Christophers who made his debut in 2002 started his rugby career with RG Heidelberg, being the son of a German mother and English father.

In Germany's 2006–08 European Nations Cup campaign, Mustafa Güngör, Christopher Weselek, Edmoore Takaendesa, Tim Coly, Manuel Wilhelm, Sebastian Werle, Kehoma Brenner, Tim Kasten and Steffen Thier were called up for the national team while being on the club's roster.

In the 2008–10 campaign, Güngör, Weselek, Takaendesa, Coly, Wilhelm and Brenner all appeared for the RGH and Germany again, while Pierre Faber and Fabian Heimpel were new additions to the club's list of internationals.

In the 2010–12 campaign, Manuel Wilhelm, Mustafa Güngör, Tim Coly and Fabian Heimpel were re-selected for Germany, with Güngör leaving RGH at the end of the 2010-11 season, while Bastian Himmer was a new selection.

For the opening match of the 2012–14 edition of the ENC against Ukraine the club had only Manuel Wilhelm selected for the team.

The club had six players selected for the German under-18 team at the 2009 European Under-18 Rugby Union Championship, these being Elmar Heimpel, Nicolas Kurzer, Bastian Himmer, Robert Hittel, Luis Becker and Raffael Ruck . Of these, Elmar Heimpel, Luis Becker and Robert Hittel also played at the 2010 tournament, as did Nicolas Kurzer, who was then with the Heidelberger TV.

With Marvin Dieckmann, Robert Haase, Fabian Heimpel, Bastian Himmer, Tim Lichtenberg, Robin Plümpe as well as Johannes and Simon Schreieck, the club currently has 8 players in the German national Rugby 7s squad. Dieckmann also made his international debut in XV Rugby for Germany in his sides´24-21 win over Uruguay in November 2016.

== Coaches ==
Recent coaches of the club:

Name	Period
Rudolf Finsterer	2002–2008
Thomas Kurzer	2008–2009
Rudolf Finsterer	2009–2011
(England) Jamie Houston	2011-2012
Bernd Schöpfel	2012-2013
Christopher Weselek	2013 -2016
Rudolf Finsterer	2016 -2017
Jeff Tigere	2017 - 2025
