= Clemens von Grumbkow =

German rugby union player (born 1983)

- Born: Clemens von Grumbkow; 22 July 1983 (age 43) Leimen, West Germany
- Height: 1.91 m (6 ft 3 in)
- Weight: 101 kg (15 st 13 lb)

Rugby union career
- Position: Centre
Amateur team(s)
Years	Team	Apps	(Points)
1990–2004	SC Neuenheim		
2005	Stoke RFC		
Senior career
Years	Team	Apps	(Points)
2005–2009	RC Orléans	47	(50)
2009-2012	Cavalieri	59	(75)
2012–2013	U.S. Dax	12	(5)
2013-	Cavalieri	10	(20)
- Correct as of 28 January 2014
International career
Years	Team	Apps	(Points)
2003–	Germany	33	(10)
National sevens team
Years	Team		Comps
- Germany

Clemens von Grumbkow (born 22 July 1983) is a German international rugby union player, playing for the U.S. Dax in the French Rugby Pro D2. He made his debut for Germany in a game against Poland in 2003.

== Biography ==
Von Grumbkow was born in Leimen, and originally played for SC Neuenheim in Germany, being part of the club's national championship-winning team in 2003 and 2004, before joining New Zealand club Stoke RFC for the 2005 season. From 2006 to 2009, he played for French club RC Orléans, a club with a number of German internationals in its ranks at the time. From 2009, he played in Italy's highest league, the Super 10 (now Top12), for Rugby Club I Cavalieri Prato. At the end of the 2011–12 season he switched to the French second division side U.S. Dax.

Von Grumbkow is also regularly part of the German sevens squad and played for his country at the 2005 World Games in Duisburg and the 2009 London Sevens.

== Honours ==
=== Club ===
- German rugby union championship
  - Champions: 2003, 2004

=== National team ===
- European Nations Cup – Division 2
  - Champions: 2008

== Stats ==
Clemens von Grumbkow's personal statistics in club and international rugby:

=== National team ===
==== European Nations Cup ====
Year	Team	Competition	Games	Points	Place
2006–2008	Germany	European Nations Cup Second Division	7	0	Champions
2008–2010	Germany	European Nations Cup First Division	10	5	6th – Relegated
2010–2012	Germany	European Nations Cup Division 1B	2	0	4th
2012–2014	Germany	European Nations Cup Division 1B	2	5	ongoing

==== Friendlies & other competitions ====
Year	Team	Competition	Games	Points
2009	Germany	Friendly	1	0

- Updated 28 April 2013

=== Club ===
Year	Team	Competition	Games	Points	Place
2006–07	RC Orléans	Fédérale 1	13	25	
2007–08	RC Orléans	Fédérale 1	18	15	
2008–09	RC Orléans	Fédérale 1	16	10	
2009–10	Cavalieri Prato	National Championship of Excellence	16	5	
2010–11	Cavalieri Prato	National Championship of Excellence	14	20	
2011–12	Cavalieri Prato	National Championship of Excellence	15	40	
2012–13	Dax	Rugby Pro D2			

- Updated 30 April 2012
