= 2010–11 Rugby-Bundesliga =

- Countries: Germany; Luxembourg
- Champions: Heidelberger RK (8th title)
- Runners-up: SC 1880 Frankfurt
- Promoted: TV Pforzheim
- Relegated: none, expansion of league
- Top point scorer: (New Zealand) Keiran Manawatu (282)
- Top try scorer: (New Zealand) Caine Elisara (27)

The 2010–11 Rugby-Bundesliga was the 40th edition of this competition and the 91st edition of the German rugby union championship. In the Rugby-Bundesliga, the first division, nine teams played a home-and-away season with a finals round between the top four teams at the end. The season started on 28 August 2010 and finish with the championship final on 28 May 2011, interrupted by a winter break from December to late February. Cold weather and heavy snow falls however meant that the last game before the winter break was played already on 6 November 2010.

The championship was won by Heidelberger RK, the defending champion, who defeated SC 1880 Frankfurt 12-9 in the final, marking the third season in a row that these two teams played each other in the championship game, being the only two professional sides in German rugby. Heidelberg had won the 2010 final while Frankfurt triumphed in 2009. It as the eighth championship for HRK. The two finalists of 2009 and 2010 are the only two clubs in Germany considered professional, the remaining clubs and players are all amateurs.

Below the Rugby-Bundesliga sits the 2nd Rugby-Bundesliga, which is divided into two divisions with ten teams each. With the RC Luxembourg, a team from Luxembourg, a non-German side competes in the league in 2010-11, the club having joined the German league system in 2009.

In the 2nd Bundesliga, TV Pforzheim won the championship and promotion without dropping a game, while northern champion TSV Victoria Linden declined promotion for a second year in a row.

Location of teams in the Rugby-Bundesliga 2010-11

== Overview ==
The 2009-10 modus is identical to the previous season. However, the competition had been reduced from ten to nine teams, after the withdrawal of the ASV Köln Rugby during last season and no team from the 2nd Bundesliga accepting promotion. Like in 2008-09, the top four teams qualify for the finals. The two semi-finals winners then contested the championship final.

At the bottom end of the table, nominally the last two teams are relegated while the 2nd Rugby-Bundesliga champions are promoted, however, this is subject to the 2nd Bundesliga champions accepting promotion and a decision on the league strength for 2011-12. In February 2011, the DRV decided that the league would continue to play with ten teams in the future.

As a sign of the gap between the Bundesliga and the 2nd Bundesliga, TSV Victoria Linden, who only won the 2009-10 North/East division in the last round of the championship, declined promotion, citing the additional cost of travelling and the limited player pool as their reason. The South/West champion, Stuttgarter RC, also declined promotion because of the loss of eight first-team players at the end of the season, originally leaving the Bundesliga with only eight clubs for the next season. DSV 78 protested the decision to reduce the league to eight teams again and thereby relegating the club, and was ultimately permitted to stay in the league.

In the 2nd Bundesliga, SC Siemensstadt and TV Pforzheim are new teams for 2010-11, while FT Adler Kiel Rugby and RC Mainz were relegated. A third team, the Karlsruher SV Rugby, withdrew from the league during the 2009-10 season.

After suffering nine defeats in eleven games, the SC Siemensstadt withdrew its team from the North/East division of the 2nd Bundesliga in March 2011.

== Bundesliga table ==
The final standings in the table:

	Club	Played	Won	Drawn	Lost	Points for	Points against	Difference	Bonus points	Points
1	Heidelberger RK	16	15	0	1	924	120	804	15	75
2	SC 1880 Frankfurt	16	14	0	2	849	237	612	12	68
3	TSV Handschuhsheim	16	11	0	5	468	439	29	9	53
4	RG Heidelberg	16	9	0	7	512	264	248	8	44
5	SC Neuenheim	16	9	0	7	380	395	-15	8	44
6	Berliner Rugby Club	16	7	0	9	281	471	-190	6	34
7	DSV 78 Hannover	16	4	0	12	265	594	-329	4	20
8	RK 03 Berlin	16	2	0	14	195	688	-493	2	10
9	RK Heusenstamm	16	1	0	15	183	849	-666	3	7

- Relegated: None, league expanded to ten teams in 2011-12
- Promoted: TV Pforzheim

== Bundesliga results ==
The results of the Bundesliga in 2010–11:

Club	HRK	SCF	TSV	RGH	SCN	BRC	DSV	RKB	RKH
Heidelberger RK	—	36–6	44–9	19–10	31–7	74–18	84–0	60–5	112–0
SC 1880 Frankfurt	16–14	—	72–35	43–29	19–17	57–0	80–0	92–17	69–12
TSV Handschuhsheim	10–64	29–22	—	18–9	13–22	50–24	41–10	44–15	47–21
RG Heidelberg	17–27	21–30	13–20	—	28–24	16–9	43–16	47–12	84–0
SC Neuenheim	3–53	7–81	25–33	13–32	—	51–13	31–26	27–11	51–7
Berliner Rugby Club	0–71	10–22	23–25	18–14	8–14	—	32–20	25–15	29–12
DSV 78 Hannover	0–48	5–84	40–31	8–17	10–18	13–14	—	19–13	53–11
RK 03 Berlin	12–87	5–49	17–38	0–50	15–43	7–37	32–22	—	11–10
RK Heusenstamm	7–100	0–107	18–25	7–82	15–27	10–21	15–23	38–8	—

=== Key ===
Home win	Draw	Away win

== Player statistics ==
=== Try scorers ===
The leading try scores in the Rugby-Bundesliga 2010–11 season were (10 tries or more):

Player	Club	Tries
(New Zealand) Caine Elisara	Heidelberger RK	27
(New Zealand) Keiran Manawatu	SC 1880 Frankfurt	26
(Georgia (country)) Shalva Didebashvili	SC Neuenheim	15
(Germany) Mustafa Güngör	RG Heidelberg	13
(South Africa) Pieter Jordaan	Heidelberger RK	13
(Australia) Sean Armstrong	Heidelberger RK	12
(New Zealand) Wayne Hughson	SC 1880 Frankfurt	12
(Germany) Tim Kasten	Heidelberger RK	12
(Germany) Alexander Pipa	TSV Handschuhsheim	12
(Zimbabwe) Manasah Sita	SC Neuenheim	12
(Germany) Anjo Buckman	Heidelberger RK	11
(Germany) Steffen Liebig	Heidelberger RK	11
(Fiji) Peniasi Loco Tokacece	SC 1880 Frankfurt	10

=== Point scorers ===
The leading point scores in the 2010–11 Rugby-Bundesliga season were (100 points or more):

Player	Club	Points
(New Zealand) Keiran Manawatu	SC 1880 Frankfurt	282
(Germany) Fabian Heimpel	RG Heidelberg	167
(Germany) Steffen Liebig	Heidelberger RK	143
(New Zealand) Caine Elisara	Heidelberger RK	137
(Germany) Matthias Pipa	TSV Handschuhsheim	133
(South Africa) Pieter Jordaan	Heidelberger RK	109

=== Per club ===
The top try and point scorers per club were:

Club	Player	Tries	Player	Points
Berliner RC	(Germany) Sebastian Freund	4	(Germany) Christian Schubert	76
RK 03 Berlin	(Germany) Christian Lill	5	(Germany) Marc Lowdon	73
SC 1880 Frankfurt	(New Zealand) Keiran Manawatu	26	(New Zealand) Keiran Manawatu	282
TSV Handschuhsheim	(Germany) Alexander Pipa	12	(Germany) Matthias Pipa	133
DSV 78 Hannover	(Germany) Benjamin Simm (Germany) Pascal Fischer	4	(Germany) Marvin Dieckmann	80
RG Heidelberg	(Germany) Mustafa Güngör	13	(Germany) Fabian Heimpel	167
Heidelberger RK	(New Zealand) Caine Elisara	27	(Germany) Steffen Liebig	143
RK Heusenstamm	(Germany) Torsten Krapscha	5	(Germany) Pascal Schuster	53
SC Neuenheim	(Georgia (country)) Shalva Didebashvili	15	(Germany) Lars Eckert	54

== Semi-finals and final ==
=== Semi-finals ===
2011-05-21
15:00

SC 1880 Frankfurt	41 – 9	TSV Handschuhsheim
	Report

Sportanlage an der Feldgerichtstrasse, Frankfurt
Attendance: 300
Referee: Jan Craenen

2011-05-22
15:00

Heidelberger RK	38 – 11	RG Heidelberg
	Report

Fritz-Grunebaum-Sportpark, Heidelberg
Referee: Florian Forstmeyer

=== Final ===
The 2011 final of the Rugby-Bundesliga was a closely contested game. Frankfurt lead the game from early on until almost the end of regular time. A late try by New Zealander Jesse Westerlund however equalised Frankfurt's lead, followed by a conversion by South African Pieter Jordaan. A desperate attack by Frankfurt in injury time was not rewarded and Heidelberg was able to defend its narrow lead and thereby its German title.

2011-05-28
16:00

SC 1880 Frankfurt	9 – 12	Heidelberger RK
Pen: Manawatu (3) 6', 15', 24'	Report	Try: Widiker 31', Westerlund 80'; Con: Jordaan 80'

Sportanlage an der Feldgerichtstrasse, Frankfurt
Attendance: 1,500
Referee: Frank Himmer

SC 1880 FRANKFURT:
FB	15	Keiran Manawatu
RW	14	Carlos Soteras Merz
OC	13	Mark Sztyndera
IC	12	Graham Smith
LW	11	Sam Leung-Wai (substituted off) 3'
FH	10	Jason Campell
SH	9	Chad Shepherd
N8	8	Timo Vollenkemper (substituted off) 63'
OF	7	Peniasi Loco Tokacece
BF	6	Eugene Smith (substituted off) 52'
RL	5	Alexander Hauck
LL	4	Daniel Preussner (substituted off) 54'
TP	3	Josh Keys (substituted off) 63'
HK	2	John Pareanga
LP	1	Sam Biddles
Substitutes:
LW		Anton Ewald (substituted in) 3'
BF		Benjamin Krimer (substituted in) 52'
LL		Rolf Wacha (substituted in) 54'
TP		Chad Slaby (substituted in) 63'
N8		Jannis Läpple (substituted in) 63'
Coach:
(New Zealand) Aaron Satchwell

HEIDELBERGER RK:
FB	15	Steffen Liebig
RW	14	Christopher Neureuther (substituted off) 77'
OC	13	Rafael Pyrasch
IC	12	Pieter Johannes Jordaan
LW	11	Anjo Buckman
FH	10	Jesse Westerlund
SH	9	Sean Armstrong
N8	8	Caine Elisara
OF	7	Kehoma Brenner
BF	6	Tim Kasten
RL	5	Julio David Rodriguez
LL	4	Dan Armitage (substituted off) 40'
TP	3	Patrick Schliwa
HK	2	Alexander Widiker (yellow card) 45' to 55'
LP	1	Arthur Zeiler (substituted off) 88'
Substitutes:
LL		Benjamin Danso (substituted in) 40'
RW		Christopher Liebig (substituted in) 77'
LP		Alexander Biskupek (substituted in) 88'
Coach:
(South Africa) Kobus Potgieter

== 2nd Bundesliga tables ==
=== South/West ===
The final standings in the table:

	Club	Played	Won	Drawn	Lost	Points for	Points against	Difference	Bonus points	Points
1	TV Pforzheim	18	18	0	0	1,229	177	1,052	18	90
2	RC Luxembourg	18	14	0	4	476	244	232	8	64
3	München RFC	18	9	2	7	408	352	56	12	52
4	TSV Handschuhsheim II	18	10	0	8	414	435	-21	11	51
5	Heidelberger RK II	18	10	0	8	516	454	62	10	50
6	ASV Köln Rugby	18	8	1	9	446	414	32	11	45
7	SC 1880 Frankfurt II	18	6	0	12	400	532	-132	8	32
8	RG Heidelberg II	18	6	2	10	370	569	-199	5	31
9	Stuttgarter RC	18	4	1	13	267	698	-431	6	22
10	StuSta München	18	2	0	16	191	842	-651	1	9

- Promoted to Bundesliga: TV Pforzheim
- Relegated from Bundesliga: none
- Relegated from 2nd Bundesliga: Stuttgarter RC, StuSta München, RG Heidelberg II^{1}
- Promoted to 2nd Bundesliga: RC Aachen, Heidelberger TV, RC Mainz
- ^{1} Five days before the 2011-12 seasons start, the RG Heidelberg withdrew its reserve team from the 2nd Rugby-Bundesliga South/West, citing inability to guarantee a full player squad for the whole season.

=== North/East ===
The final standings in the table:

	Club	Played	Won	Drawn	Lost	Points for	Points against	Difference	Bonus points	Points
1	TSV Victoria Linden	16	13	1	2	618	251	367	13	67
2	FC St Pauli Rugby	16	12	1	3	528	250	278	14	64
3	SC Germania List	16	12	0	4	460	249	211	10	58
4	RU Hohen Neuendorf	16	9	1	6	430	298	132	12	50
5	USV Potsdam	16	7	1	8	501	427	74	6	36
6	SG SV Odin/VfR Döhren	16	5	0	11	221	581	-360	3	23
7	DRC Hannover	16	5	0	11	231	505	-274	2	22
8	Berliner RC II	16	4	0	12	249	492	-243	5	21
9	Hamburger RC	16	3	0	13	239	424	-185	5	17
10	SC Siemensstadt	0	0	0	0	0	0	0	0	0

- Promoted to Bundesliga: none
- Relegated from Bundesliga: none
- Relegated from 2nd Bundesliga: SG SV Odin/VfR Döhren^{2}, SC Siemensstadt^{1}
- Promoted to 2nd Bundesliga: Welfen Braunschweig, Berliner SV 92
- ^{1} SC Siemensstadt withdrew in March 2011, its record being expulsed.
- ^{2} Team withdrew from league.

== 2nd Bundesliga final ==
2011-05-28
14:00

TV Pforzheim	89 – 0	TSV Victoria Linden

Sportplatz an der Feldgerichtstraße, Frankfurt am Main
Referee: Forstmeyer
