= Sportanlage an der Feldgerichtstrasse =

Rugby union stadium in Frankfurt am Main, Germany

- Location: Frankfurt am Main, Germany
- Capacity: 5,000

Construction
- Opened: 1924

Tenants
- SC 1880 Frankfurt; Germany

The Sportanlage an der Feldgerichtstrasse is a rugby union stadium in Frankfurt am Main, Germany. It is the home ground of the SC 1880 Frankfurt and also frequently used for international games of the Germany national rugby union team. It was opened in 1924.

In its 2010-2012 European Nations Cup First Division campaign, Germany played its opening game against Poland in the Stadium as well as two warm up matches against a New Zealand Ambassadors XV.

Since 2007, the stadium has also hosted the annual final of the German rugby union championship.
