= 2011–12 Rugby-Bundesliga =

- Countries: Germany; Luxembourg
- Champions: Heidelberger RK (8th title)
- Runners-up: TV Pforzheim
- Promoted: 12 clubs
- Relegated: none, expansion of league
- Top point scorer: (New Zealand) Luke James Muggeridge (234)
- Top try scorer: (New Zealand) Caine Elisara (31)

The 2011–12 Rugby-Bundesliga was the 41st edition of this competition and the 92nd edition of the German rugby union championship. In the Rugby-Bundesliga, the first division, ten teams played a home-and-away season with semi-finals and a final between the top four teams at the end. The season started on 27 August 2010 and finished with the championship final on 5 May 2012, interrupted by a winter break from mid-December to late February. The league's top try scorer was Caine Elisara for the second year running while Luke James Muggeridge took out the honours of best points scorer for the first time. Both are from New Zealand and played for Heidelberger RK.

The league was won by Heidelberger RK who defeated TV Pforzheim 20-16 to earn its third consecutive title. TV Pforzheim played in its first-ever German championship final, having defeated SC 1880 Frankfurt 46–25 in the semi-finals. Frankfurt had played in the previous five finals and won the championship in 2008 and 2009. The second semi-final was played between HRK and SC Neuenheim with the former winning 71–21.

In the second tier, the 2nd Rugby-Bundesliga, FC St. Pauli Rugby and the reserve team of SC 1880 Frankfurt took out the division titles, with SC 1880 Frankfurt II taking out the overall title with a 32–22 finals victory.

Both divisions of the 2nd Bundesliga played with only nine instead of ten clubs. The South/West division lost RG Heidelberg II just before the start of the season when the club decided to withdraw its reserve team to the third division while the reserve team of Berliner Rugby Club was withdrawn during the season. RU Hohen Neuendorf was expulsed from the league during the season for falling to field in two games without adequate excuse. TSV Handschuhsheim II was punished the same way for the same reason after the season had ended, with both of the teams being relegated.

In mid-July 2012 the Deutsche Rugby Tag, the annual general meeting of the DRV decided to approve a league reform proposed by German international Manuel Wilhelm. The new system will see the number of clubs in the Bundesliga increased from ten to 24 in 2012–13, the league divided into four regional divisions of six clubs each and the finals series expanded from four to eight teams. One of the main aims of the reform was to reduce the number of kilometres traveled by individual teams and therefore reduce the travel expenses. Additionally, the 2nd Bundesliga would be expanded to 24 teams.

== Bundesliga table ==
The final standings in the table:

	Club	Played	Won	Drawn	Lost	Points for	Points against	Difference	Bonus points	Points
1	Heidelberger RK	18	17	0	1	1100	209	891	17	85
2	SC 1880 Frankfurt	18	15	0	3	837	275	562	14	74
3	TV Pforzheim	18	15	1	2	834	348	486	14	74
4	SC Neuenheim	18	11	0	7	469	390	79	10	54
5	TSV Handschuhsheim	18	8	1	9	511	593	-82	14	48
6	RG Heidelberg	18	7	1	10	327	507	-180	4	32
7	DSV 78 Hannover	18	5	1	12	278	629	-351	6	28
8	RK 03 Berlin	18	5	0	13	372	898	-526	6	27
9	Berliner Rugby Club	18	2	0	16	321	653	-332	9	17
10	RK Heusenstamm	18	3	0	15	283	830	-547	4	16

- TV Pforzheim deducted 2 points.
- Relegated: None, league expanded to 22 teams in 2012-13
- Promoted from the 2nd Bundesliga South/West: Heidelberger TV, RC Luxembourg, ASV Köln Rugby, RC Mainz, RC Aachen
- Promoted from the 2nd Bundesliga North/East: FC St. Pauli Rugby, SC Germania List, TSV Victoria Linden, Hamburger RC, Berliner SV 92, USV Potsdam Rugby (DRC Hannover withdrew before the first round due to a lack of players, therefore only 22 teams in the Bundesliga in 2012–13)
- Promoted from the Rugby-Regionalliga: RC Leipzig (Berlin Grizzlies withdrew before the start of the season, therefore only 22 teams in the Bundesliga in 2012–13)

== Bundesliga results ==
The results of the Bundesliga in 2011–12:

Club	HRK	SCF	TVP	SCN	TSV	RGH	DSV	RKB	BRC	RKH
Heidelberger RK	—	22–19	24–17	34–3	147–12	45–5	102–0	109–7	50–0	99–0
SC 1880 Frankfurt	26–39	—	49–7	30–0	38–14	48–23	71–12	120–0	30–15	82–0
TV Pforzheim	26–24	27–17	—	37–20	62–39	67–21	60–18	104–24	54–7	41–7
SC Neuenheim	32–33	15–24	11–20	—	26–22	15–16	33–15	71–14	27–10	29–8
TSV Handschuhsheim	10–58	19–36	27–34	26–29	—	20–22	27–11	47–17	36–17	45–3
RG Heidelberg	26–46	14–37	27–27	21–24	10–32	—	31–0	21–7	20–13	10–26
DSV 78 Hannover	7–41	12–59	11–41	17–22	34–34	23–11	—	33–0	22–16	13–12
RK 03 Berlin	14–64	17–60	7–60	24–41	26–44	50–0	24–11	—	28–21	39–19
Berliner RC	0–75	15–27	13–78	8–33	8–11	10–16	34–39	51–36	—	40–25
RK Heusenstamm	5–88	24–64	12–72	31–38	15–46	17–33	11–10	22–38	46–43	—

=== Key ===
Home win	Draw	Away win

== Player statistics ==
=== Try scorers ===
The leading try scores in the 2011–12 Rugby-Bundesliga season were (10 tries or more):

Player	Club	Tries
(New Zealand) Caine Elisara	Heidelberger RK	31
(New Zealand) Rusell Ngamarama Kupa	TV Pforzheim	24
(New Zealand) Shaun Walker	Heidelberger RK	21
(Germany) Tim Kasten	Heidelberger RK	21
(New Zealand) Jacob Kennedy	TV Pforzheim	17
(New Zealand) Rob May	TSV Handschuhsheim	15
(Zimbabwe) Manasah Sita	SC Neuenheim	13
(New Zealand) Jesse Westerlund	Heidelberger RK	13
(New Zealand) Alex Jessop	TV Pforzheim	13
(Samoa) Afa Tauli	TV Pforzheim	11
(Germany) Steffen Liebig	Heidelberger RK	11
(New Zealand) Kieran Manawatu	SC 1880 Frankfurt	10
(Australia) Sean Armstrong	Heidelberger RK	10

=== Point scorers ===
The leading point scores in the 2011–12 Rugby-Bundesliga season were (100 points or more):

Player	Club	Points
(New Zealand) Luke James Muggeridge	Heidelberger RK	234
(New Zealand) Sam Harris	SC Neuenheim	163
(Germany) Mathias Pipa	TSV Handschuhsheim	162
(New Zealand) Caine Elisara	Heidelberger RK	157
(New Zealand) Jacob Kennedy	TV Pforzheim	132
(Germany) Fabian Heimpel	RG Heidelberg	131
(New Zealand) Jeremy Te Huia	TV Pforzheim	121
(New Zealand) Alex Jessop	TV Pforzheim	112
(Germany) Tim Kasten	Heidelberger RK	105
(New Zealand) Shaun Walker	Heidelberger RK	105

=== Per club ===
The top try and point scorers per club were:

Club	Player	Tries	Player	Points
Berliner RC	(Germany) Robert Taylor	5	(Germany) Raphael Hackl	55
RK 03 Berlin	(Germany) Christian Lill	9	(Germany) Christian Lill	45
SC 1880 Frankfurt	(New Zealand) Kieran Manawatu	10	(New Zealand) Kieran Manawatu	86
TSV Handschuhsheim	(New Zealand) Rob May	15	(Germany) Mathias Pipa	162
DSV 78 Hannover	(Germany) Nikolai Siekmann	6	(Germany) Steven Bouajila	48
RG Heidelberg	(Germany) Bastian Himmer	6	(Germany) Fabian Heimpel	131
Heidelberger RK	(New Zealand) Caine Elisara	31	(New Zealand) Luke James Muggeridge	234
RK Heusenstamm	(Germany) Benjamin Polheim (Germany) Patrick Weber (Germany) Tim Biniak	5	(Germany) Pascal Schuster	76
SC Neuenheim	(Zimbabwe) Manasah Sita	13	(New Zealand) Sam Harris	163
TV Pforzheim	(New Zealand) Rusell Ngamarama Kupa	24	(New Zealand) Jacob Kennedy	132

== Semi-finals and final ==
=== Semi-finals ===
2012-04-28
14:00

SC 1880 Frankfurt	25 – 46	TV Pforzheim
Try: Raea 37', K. Manawatu 40', Shepherd 80'; Con: K. Manawatu (2) 37', 80'; Pen: K. Manawatu 16', T. Manawatu 49'	Report	Try: Güngör 28', Bain 51', Kupa 59', Jessop 84'; Con: Te Huia (4) 28', 51', 59', 84'; Pen: Te Huia (6) 23' 34', 43', 46', 62', 76'

Sportanlage an der Feldgerichtstrasse, Frankfurt
Attendance: 500
Referee: Jan Craenen

2012-04-28
18:00

Heidelberger RK	71 – 21	SC Neuenheim
Try: Rodriguez (2) 10', 36', Muggeridge 13', Walker (2) 20', 79', Mathurin 25', Elisara (2) 28', 60', Kasten 54', Armstrong 56', Liebig 72'; Con: Muggeridge (7), 13', 20', 25', 28', 36', 54', 56', Liebig 60'	Report	Try: Strauch 37', Nechironga 79', Da Fonseca 80'; Con: Harris (2) 37', 80', Nechironga 79'

Fritz-Grunebaum-Sportpark, Heidelberg
Attendance: 400
Referee: Florian Forstmeyer

=== Final ===
2012-05-05
16:00

Heidelberger RK	20 – 16	TV Pforzheim
Try: Liebig 23', Elisara 51'; Con: Muggeridge (2) 23', 52'; Pen: Muggeridge (2) 28', 57'	Report	Try: Shaw 58'; Con: Te Huia 58'; Pen: Te Huia (3) 35', 45', 64'

Fritz-Grunebaum-Sportpark, Heidelberg
Attendance: 1,900
Referee: Frank Himmer

== 2nd Bundesliga tables ==
=== South/West ===
The final standings in the table:

	Club	Played	Won	Drawn	Lost	Points for	Points against	Difference	Bonus Points	Points
1	SC 1880 Frankfurt II	16	12	0	4	446	214	232	14	62
2	Heidelberger TV	16	10	0	6	436	269	167	8	48
3	RC Luxembourg	16	10	0	6	347	276	71	6	46
4	ASV Köln Rugby	16	10	0	6	318	317	1	5	45
5	Heidelberger RK II	16	7	0	9	389	406	-17	8	36
6	RC Mainz	16	6	0	10	289	392	-103	8	32
7	München RFC	16	6	0	10	220	263	-43	6	30
8	TSV Handschuhsheim II	16	7	0	9	250	434	-184	3	27
9	RC Aachen	16	4	0	12	270	394	-124	7	21

- Promoted to Bundesliga: Heidelberger TV, RC Luxembourg, ASV Köln Rugby, RC Mainz, RC Aachen
- Relegated from Bundesliga: None
- Relegated from 2nd Bundesliga South/West: TSV Handschuhsheim II (demoted), Heidelberger RK II (voluntary)
- Promoted to 2nd Bundesliga South/West: Division disbanded

=== North/East ===
The final standings in the table:

	Club	Played	Won	Drawn	Lost	Points for	Points against	Difference	Bonus Points	Points
1	FC St. Pauli Rugby	14	13	0	1	537	190	347	11	63
2	SC Germania List	14	10	0	4	453	197	256	8	48
3	USV Potsdam Rugby	14	8	1	5	390	305	85	8	42
4	Hamburger RC	14	7	0	7	287	266	21	6	34
5	DRC Hannover	14	7	1	6	254	346	-92	4	34
6	TSV Victoria Linden	14	6	0	8	256	302	-46	9	33
7	Berliner SV 92 Rugby	14	4	0	10	194	403	-209	3	19
8	Welfen Braunschweig	14	0	0	14	117	479	-362	5	5
9	RU Hohen Neuendorf	0	0	0	0	0	0	0	0	0

- Promoted to Bundesliga: FC St. Pauli Rugby, SC Germania List, TSV Victoria Linden, DRC Hannover, Hamburger RC, Berliner SV 92, USV Potsdam Rugby
- Relegated from Bundesliga: None
- Relegated from 2nd Bundesliga North/East: RU Hohen Neuendorf (demoted), DRC Hannover (voluntary)
- Promoted to 2nd Bundesliga North/East: Division disbanded

== 2nd Bundesliga final ==
2012-05-01
14:00

FC St. Pauli Rugby	22 – 32	SC 1880 Frankfurt II
	Report

Rugby-Arena Saarlandstraße, Hamburg
Attendance: 350
Referee: Scharmann
