= Germany national under-18 rugby union team =

Germany under-18
- Union: Deutscher Rugby-Verband
- Coach(es): Jan Ceselka; Christian Lill
Team kit

The Germany national under-18 rugby union team is the under-18 team of the Germany national rugby union team in the sport of rugby union.

== Overview ==
The German team has, for the most part, played in the B-Division of the European Under-18 Rugby Union Championship, however, it earned promotion to the A-Division in 2009.

=== 2009 ===
The German team earned promotion to the A division of the European championship at the 2009 tournament in southern France. It had won promotion to the elite division of European under-18 rugby for the first time in many years. Germany beat Portugal 11-3 in the final of the B tournament to clinch promotion.

The German team took part in the tournament with the following squad:

- Julius Nostadt, Tim Menzel, Chris Hilsenbeck (US Colomiers), Tom Schiiling (RK 03 Berlin), Samy Füchsel (Berliner RC), Fabian Tacke, Kevin Nelson (SC Germania List), Jörn Schröder (TSV Victoria Linden), Elmar Heimpel, Nicolas Kurzer, Bastian Himmer, Robert Hittel, Luis Becker, Raffael Ruck (RG Heidelberg), Dustin Dobravsky (Canada), Timo Vollenkemper (Wiedenbrücker TV), Sam Rainger (RK Heusenstamm), Matthias Marin, Sebastian Kößler, Konstantin Hoffmann (TSV Handschuhsheim), Michail Tyumenev, Nicolas Müller, Dennis Denzin, Phil Szczesny (DSV 78 Hannover), Chris Kleebauer (Gloucester), Pascal Drügemöller (SC Neuenheim), Jerome Ruhnau (TuS 95 Düsseldorf).

=== 2010 ===
In the 2010 edition of the European under-18 rugby union championship, the team, freshly promoted to the A group, pulled off a surprise 44-0 victory over Romania. Germany lost its opening game to eventual runners-up Ireland 20-11, but managed to win its second game, against Romania, 44-0. In its third and final game in the tournament, against Italy for fifth place, Germany lost 18-13. Chris Thau, Publications Manager of the IRB, commented after the Romania game that it was the first time in the almost 40 years he had been watching German national teams, that a German team played world class rugby.

The German team, coached by Jan Ceselka (TSV Handschuhsheim) and Christian Lill (RK 03 Berlin), took part in the tournament with the following squad:

- Nicolas Kurzer, Robert Hittel, Hannes Huber, Matthias Kunzmann (Heidelberger TV), Sebastian Kößler (TSV Handschuhsheim), Elmar Heimpel, Luis Becker (RG Heidelberg), Pascal Drügemöller (SC Neuenheim), Phil Szczesny, Nicolas Müller, Adrian de Riz, Pascal Fischer (DSV 78 Hannover), Jörn Schröder (TSV Victoria Linden), Fabian Tacke, Kevin Nelson, Kevin Riege (SC Germania List), Samy Füchsel (Berliner RC), Lukas Deichmann, Jens Listmann, Adam Howes (SC 1880 Frankfurt), Kilian Kleine (Coventry R.F.C.), Julius Nostadt, Chris Hilsenbeck, Tim Menzel (US Colomiers), Eddie Mallaby (Harlequin F.C.), Robin Plümpe (Waiheke Island RFC).

=== 2011 ===
Germany won its opening game of the 2011, defeating Belgium 27-11 and thereby achieving the teams aim of not being relegated. The team then suffered a heavy 3-87 defeat against Scotland, a game that clearly showed the difference between the standards of rugby between the two nations. In the final game of the tournament, Germany lost 0-40 to Georgia and finished fourth in its division.

Germany called up the following players for the 2011 tournament:

- Adrian de Riz, Daniel Windolf, Nico Kretschmer, Felix Schippe (DSV 78 Hannover), Kevin Riege (SC Germania List), Robin Brömer, Hasan Tekkal (TSV Victoria Linden), Sebastian Fromm (Clongowes Wood College), Marc Hittel, Vincent Fischer, Carsten Lang (RG Heidelberg), Leonard Becker, Luca Hoffmann (SC Neuenheim), Frederick Lüthke (Stuttgarter RC), Ali Sürer (TB Rohrbach), Max Utikal (RK Heusenstamm), Lukas Deichmann, Jens Listmann (SC 1880 Frankfurt), Philipp Gerigk (ASV Köln Rugby), Julius König (Wald-Merscheider TV), Theodor Lorenz Schmidt-Bleek, Lukas Wende, Maxim Gazzo (Berliner RC), Kilian Kleine, Eddy Mallaby and Rory Sarjeant (all three playing in England).

=== 2012 ===
Germany called up the following players:

Backs
Player	Position	Club
Leonard Becker	Scrum-half	(Germany) SC Neuenheim
Jeremy Schnattbaum	Scrum-half	(Germany) Berliner RC
Daniel Koch	Fly-half	(Germany) SC Germania List
Sebastian Fromm	Centre	(Germany) RG Heidelberg
Robert Haase	Centre	(Germany) TGS Hausen
Luca Hoffmann	Centre	(Germany) RG Heidelberg
Roman Güllübag	Centre	(Germany) SC Neuenheim
Marc Hittel	Wing	(Germany) Heidelberger TV
Tom Tropartz	Wing	(Germany) RC Aachen
Shaza Kaczmarek	Wing	(Germany) DSV 78 Hannover
Fabian Rang	Fullback	(Germany) RG Heidelberg

Forwards
Player	Position	Club
Rory Sarjeant	Hooker	(England) Northampton Old Scouts
Vincent Spiess	Hooker	(Germany) TSV Handschuhsheim
Frederick Lüthcke	Prop	(Germany) Stuttgarter RC
Hassan Rayan	Prop	(Germany) SC 1880 Frankfurt
Loris Philip Geibel	Prop	(Germany) TSV Handschuhsheim
Kevin Klein	Prop	(Germany) TSV Handschuhsheim
Max Schilling	Prop	(Germany) RK 03 Berlin
Kevin Landsberg	Lock	(Germany) SC Neuenheim
Manuel Müller	Lock	(Germany) RG Heidelberg
Deniz Cokesen	Flanker	(Germany) STuttgarter RC
Vincent Fischer	Flanker	(Germany) RG Heidelberg
Carsten Lang	Flanker	(Germany) RG Heidelberg
Felix Schippe	Flanker	(Germany) DRC Hannover
Lukas Wende	Flanker	(Germany) Berliner RC
Luis Marin	Flanker	(Germany) TSV Handschuhsheim

=== 2013 ===
Germany called up the following players:

Backs
Player	Position	Club
Robin Schild	Scrum-half	(Germany) TGS Hausen
Daniel Koch	Fly-half	(Germany) SC Germania List
Niklas Hohl	Fly-half	(Germany) Heidelberger RK
Nico Windemuth	Centre	(Germany) SC Germania List
Robert Haase	Centre	(Germany) TGS Hausen
Nico Burgdorf	Centre	(Germany) DSV 78 Hannover
Malik Zarth	Centre	(Germany) RG Heidelberg
Sebastian Robl	Wing	(Germany) SC Neuenheim
Max Reinhard	Wing	(Germany) TSV Handschuhsheim
Vincent Lux	Wing	(Scotland) Glenalmond College
Fabian Rang	Fullback	(Germany) RG Heidelberg
John Gregory Stone	Fullback	(Germany) Heidelberger RK

Forwards
Player	Position	Club
Lucas Müller	Hooker	(Germany) RK 03 Berlin
Mauricio Poremba	Hooker	(Germany) RG Heidelberg
Linus Gielleßen	Prop	(Germany) RC Aachen
Gabriel Jäger	Prop	(Germany) RC Rottweil
Lukas Humpe	Prop	(Germany)
Kevin Klein	Prop	(Germany) TSV Handschuhsheim
Luca Frischkorn	Lock	(Germany) TGS Hausen
Marvin Leske	Lock	(Germany) RK 03 Berlin
Tim Schiffers	Lock	(Germany) RG Heidelberg
Sven Rosenthal	Lock	(Germany) DSV 78 Hannover
Hendrik Zimmermann	Lock	(Germany) Berliner RC
Nico D'Amato	Flanker	(Germany) RG Heidelberg
Manuel Müller	Flanker	(Germany) RG Heidelberg
Max Schilling	Flanker	(Germany) RK 03 Berlin

=== 2014 ===
Germany called up the following players:

Backs
Player	Position	Club
Victor Winnewisser	Scrum-half	(Germany) RG Heidelberg
Pirmin Stöhr	Scrum-half	(Germany) TSV Handschuhsheim
Niklas Hohl	Fly-half	(Germany) Heidelberger RK
Malik Zarth	Centre	(Germany) RG Heidelberg
Tim Lichtenberg	Centre	(Germany) RG Heidelberg
Nico Windemuth	Centre	(Germany) SC Germania List
Tom Papke	Centre	(Germany)
Jonas Malaizier	Wing	(Germany) RG Heidelberg
Joshua Sayson	Wing	(Germany) BSC Offenbach
Louis Dobslaw	Wing	(Germany) RK 03 Berlin
Felician Wirxel	Wing	(Germany) SC 1880 Frankfurt
John Gregory Stone	Fullback	(Germany) Heidelberger RK

Forwards
Player	Position	Club
Justin Caracciolo	Hooker	(Germany) RG Heidelberg
André Gerstenberger	Hooker	(Germany) DSV 78 Hannover
Gabriel Jäger	Prop	(Germany) RC Rottweil
Thore Schmidt	Prop	(Germany) F.C. St. Pauli
Marcel Danzer	Prop	(Germany) TSV Handschuhsheim
Luca Frischkorn	Lock	(Germany) TGS Hausen
Max Reinhard	Lock	(Germany) Berliner RC
Eric Marks	Lock	(Germany) RC Aachen
Levin Störzinger	Lock	(Germany) Berliner RC
Robert Lehmann	Flanker	(Germany) RC Rottweil
Henk Grimminger	Lock	(Germany) RG Heidelberg
Nico D'Amato	Flanker	(Germany) RC Rottweil
Christian Bettner	Flanker	(Germany) TGS Hausen
Ben Schmermund	Flanker	(Germany) SC 1880 Frankfurt

=== 2015 ===
Germany called up the following players:

Backs
Player	Position	Club
Pirmin Stöhr	Scrum-half	(Germany) TSV Handschuhsheim
Nils Renner	Scrum-half	(Germany) Berliner RC
Niklas Koch	Fly-half	(Germany) SC Germania List
Nikolas Günther	Fly-half	(Germany) RG Heidelberg
Tim Lichtenberg	Centre	(Germany) RG Heidelberg
Benjamin Fromm	Centre	(Germany) RG Heidelberg
Louis Dobslaw	Centre	(Germany) RK 03 Berlin
Jaap Breuste	Wing	(Germany) DSV 78 Hannover
Henrik Meyer	Wing	(Germany) SC Germania List
Maurice Riege	Wing	(Germany) SC Germania List
Albert Jürgen	Fullback	(Germany) Berliner RC
Isaac Berry	Fullback	(Germany) RG Heidelberg

Forwards
Player	Position	Club
Justin Caracciolo	Hooker	(Germany) RG Heidelberg
Kai Jansen	Hooker	(Germany) TSV Handschuhsheim
Lucas Schmitt	Hooker	(Germany) TSV Handschuhsheim
Paul Schüle	Prop	(Germany) TSV Handschuhsheim
Marvin Ugbomor	Prop	(Germany) Berliner RC
Igor Marinkovic	Prop	(Germany) DSV 78 Hannover
Warrick Beehan	Prop	(Germany) SC 1880 Frankfurt
Henk Grimminger	Lock	(Germany) RG Heidelberg
Leon Wagner	Lock	(Germany) RG Heidelberg
Vincent Müller	Lock	(Germany) TSV Handschuhsheim
Tobias Haase	Lock	(Germany) DSV 78 Hannover
Levin Störzinger	Flanker	(Germany) Berliner RC
Christopher Korn	Flanker	(Germany) TSV Handschuhsheim
Franz Müller	Flanker	(Germany) RK 03 Berlin

=== 2016 ===
Germany called up the following players:

Backs
Player	Position	Club
Tino Dietz	Scrum-half	(Germany) SC Germania List
Jan Piosik	Scrum-half	(Germany) DSV 78 Hannover
Niklas Stehling	Fly-half	(Germany) SC Germania List
Emil Schäfer	Fly-half	(Germany) RG Heidelberg
Christopher Korn	Centre	(Germany) TSV Handschuhsheim
Mischa Moroz	Centre	(Germany) SC 1880 Frankfurt
Rhys Lewis	Centre	(Germany) IS Düsseldorf
Ben Ellermann	Centre	(Germany) F.C. St. Pauli
Jaap Breuste	Wing	(Germany) DSV 78 Hannover
Manuel Jäger	Wing	(Germany) RC Rottweil
Liam Boese	Wing	(Germany) DSV 78 Hannover
Isaac Berry	Fullback	(Germany) RG Heidelberg
Simon Trebbin	Fullback	(Germany) RG Heidelberg

Forwards
Player	Position	Club
Valentin Heuser	Hooker	(Germany) SC Neuenheim
Markus Ulka	Hooker	(Germany) Heidelberger RK
Marvin Ugbomor	Prop	(Germany) Berliner RC
Marcel Becker	Prop	(Germany) SC 1880 Frankfurt
Raphael Augel	Prop	(Germany) RG Heidelberg
Tom Pipke	Prop	(Germany) SC Neuenheim
Daniel Wurm	Lock	(Germany) Berliner RC
John Smith	Lock	(Germany) SC 1880 Frankfurt
Philipp Gaß	Lock	(Germany) SC 1880 Frankfurt
Justus Zimmermann	Lock	(Germany) Berliner RC
Vincent Haarmann	Flanker	(Germany) RG Heidelberg
Nikita Ovchinnikov	Flanker	(Germany) Heidelberger RK
Paul Pfisterer	Flanker	(Germany) RG Heidelberg
Franz Müller	Flanker	(Germany) RK 03 Berlin

=== 2017 ===
Germany called up the following players:

Backs
Player	Position	Club
Christian Lecht	Scrum-half	(Germany) Berliner RC
Hans Schmidt	Scrum-half	(Germany) Berliner RC
Kevin Kampf	Fly-half	(Germany) SC Germania List
Esteban Klein	Centre	(Germany) TSV Handschuhsheim
Dennis Trumer	Centre	(Germany) SC 1880 Frankfurt
Christian Ester	Centre	(Germany) Berliner RC
Martin Hartman	Centre	(Germany) Berliner RC
Rhys Tait	Wing	(Republic of Ireland) Ulster
Michael Kobel	Wing	(Germany) RG Heidelberg
Dylan Emmerson	Wing	(England) Newcastle Falcons
Maxim Weirdermann	Fullback	(Germany) TSV Handschuhsheim

Forwards
Player	Position	Club
Vincent Holpp	Hooker	(Germany) RC Rottweil
Pep De Jong	Hooker	(Germany) SC 1880 Frankfurt
Marcel Becker	Prop	(Germany) SC 1880 Frankfurt
Daniel Wurm	Prop	(Germany) Berliner RC
Andreas Weinberger	Prop	(Germany) Berliner RC
Kevin Klein	Prop	(Germany) TSV Handschuhsheim
Tom Tusche	Lock	(Germany) Berliner RC
Emil Rupf	Lock	(Germany) SC 1880 Frankfurt
Michel Himmer	Lock	(Germany) DSV 78 Hannover
Justin Renc	Flanker	(Germany) VfR Döhren
Justus Zimmermann	Flanker	(Germany) Berliner RC
Philipp Grimm	Flanker	(Germany) SC 1880 Frankfurt
Noah Ellenbogen	Flanker	(Germany) TSV Handschuhsheim
Nikita Ovchinnikov	Flanker	(Germany) Heidelberger RK
Luis Ball	Flanker	(Germany) Bremen 1860

=== 2018 ===
Germany called up the following players:

Backs
Player	Position	Club
Daniel Howley	Scrum-half	(Republic of Ireland) Ballina RFC
Francisco Arruda	Scrum-half	(Germany) Berliner RC
Benedikt Spiess	Fly-half	(Germany) RG Heidelberg
Viktor Meier	Centre	(France) USA Perpignan
Luis Diel	Centre	(Germany) SC 1880 Frankfurt
Philipp Gleitze	Centre	(Germany) Berliner RC
Ares van Look	Centre	(Germany) Berliner RC
Damian Gandy	Wing	(Germany) SC 1880 Frankfurt
Anton Gleitze	Wing	(Germany) Berliner RC
Wolfram Hacker	Wing	(Germany) RG Heidelberg
Simon Rosbach	Wing	(Germany) RG Heidelberg
Benedikt Müssig	Fullback	(Germany) TSV Handschuhsheim

Forwards
Player	Position	Club
Ben Porter	Hooker	(Germany) SC 1880 Frankfurt
Lucas Uhuegbu	Hooker	(Germany) FC St.Pauli
Nico Schätzlein	Prop	(Germany) Berliner RC
Felix Hufnagel	Prop	(Germany) SC Germania List
Andreas Weinberger	Prop	(Germany) Berliner RC
Louis Hoffmann	Prop	(Germany) SC 1880 Frankfurt
Tobias Bauer	Lock	(Germany) Berliner RC
Oliver Stein	Lock	(Germany) SC 1880 Frankfurt
Michel Himmer	Lock	(Germany) DSV 78 Hannover
Justin Renc	Flanker	(Germany) VfR Döhren
Felix Burisch	Flanker	(Germany) Berliner RC
Chris Umeh	Flanker	(Germany) Berliner RC
Dustin Innorcia	Flanker	(Germany) TSV Handschuhsheim
Benjamin Berry	Flanker	(Germany) RG Heidelberg

=== 2019 ===
Germany called up the following players:

Backs
Player	Position	Club
Daniel Howley	Scrum-half	(Republic of Ireland) Ballina RFC
Blaine Byszio	Scrum-half	(Germany) SC 1880 Frankfurt
Viktor Meier	Fly-half	(France) USA Perpignan
Jon Caister	Centre	(Germany) SC Germania List
Anton Rupf	Centre	(Germany) SC 1880 Frankfurt
EJ Freeman	Centre	(Germany) SC 1880 Frankfurt
John Dubiona	Centre	(Germany) TSV Victoria
Nick Hittel	Wing	(Germany) RG Heidelberg
Makonnen Amekeudi	Wing	(Germany) SC 1880 Frankfurt
Jacob Dipper	Wing	(Germany) SC Neuenheim
Marius De Giacogomi	Wing	(Germany) KSV
Ares van Look	Fullback	(Germany) Berliner RC
Sebastian Sorgel	Fullback	(France) Stade Montois Rugby

Forwards
Player	Position	Club
Ben Porter	Hooker	(Germany) SC 1880 Frankfurt
Maximilian Keller	Hooker	(England) Maidenhead RFC
Manuel Carrier	Prop	(Germany) Berliner RC
Viacheslav Kirsanov	Prop	(Germany) SC 1880 Frankfurt
Louis Hoffmann	Prop	(Germany) RC Konstanz
Karl Römming	Prop	(Germany) TSV Handschuhsheim
Oskar Rixen	Prop	(Germany) Berliner RC
Tobias Bauer	Lock	(Germany) Berliner RC
Moe Zimmermann	Lock	(Germany) RC Aachen
Oliver Stein	Flanker	(Germany) SC 1880 Frankfurt
Emmanuel Ngiba	Flanker	(France) RC Massy Essonne
Felix Burisch	Flanker	(Germany) Berliner RC
Chris Umeh	Flanker	(Germany) Berliner RC

== Honours ==
- European Under-18 Rugby Union Championship - B Division
  - Champions: 2009
  - Runners-up: 2007

== European championship ==
=== Results ===
Germany's recent results at the European Championship:

2009 European championship – Division A
Date	Location	Opposition	Result	Round	Report
4 April 2009	Draguignan	Netherlands	**31-0**	Quarter finals	Report
7 April 2009	La Seyne-sur-Mer	Poland	**27-0**	Semi final	Report
10 April 2009	La Seyne-sur-Mer	Portugal	**11-3**	Final	Report

2010 European championship – Elite Division
Date	Location	Opposition	Result	Round	Report
28 March 2010	San Donà di Piave	Ireland	11-20	Quarter finals	Report
31 March 2010	Casale sul Sile	Romania	**44-0**	Semi final (5-8)	Report
3 April 2010	Casale sul Sile	Italy	13-18	5th place game	Report

2011 European championship – Division A
Date	Location	Opposition	Result	Round	Report
16 April 2011	Fleurance	Belgium	**27-11**	Quarter finals	Report
19 April 2011	Lourdes	Scotland	3-87	Semi final	Report
23 April 2011	Louey	Georgia	0-40	3rd place game	Report

2012 European championship – Division A
Date	Location	Opposition	Result	Round	Report
31 March 2012	Madrid	Czech Republic	**46-0**	Quarter finals	
3 April 2012	Madrid	Spain	**15-6**	Semi final	
6 April 2012	La Seyne-sur-Mer	Belgium	**12-32**	Final	

2013 European championship – Trophy
Date	Location	Opposition	Result	Round	Report
23 March 2013	Saint-Egrève	Czech Republic	**34-5**	Quarter finals	
26 March 2013	Pont-De-Claix	Spain	**0-50**	Semi final	
30 March 2013	Grenoble	Poland	**6-30**	3rd Place game	

2014 European championship – Trophy
Date	Location	Opposition	Result	Round	Report
12 April 2014	Poznań	Romania	**3-19**	Quarter finals	
16 April 2014	Poznań	Netherlands	**12-10**	Semi final (5-8)	
19 April 2014	Poznań	Belgium	**12-9**	5th Place game	

2015 European championship – Trophy
Date	Location	Opposition	Result	Round	Report
29 March 2015	Ramonville	Poland	**30-6**	Quarter finals	
1 April 2015	Toulouse	Russia	**0-23**	Semi final	
4 April 2015	Toulouse	Romania	**11-10**	3rd Place game	

2016 European championship – Championship
Date	Location	Opposition	Result	Round	Report
23 March 2016	Lisbon	Portugal	**5-64**	Quarter finals	
27 March 2016	Lisbon	Romania	**23-11**	Semi final (5-8)	
31 March 2016	Lisbon	Spain	**29-10**	5th Place game	

2017 European championship – Trophy
Date	Location	Opposition	Result	Round	Report
8 April 2017	Brittany	Luxembourg	**67-5**	Quarter finals	
11 April 2017	Brittany	Netherlands	**15-29**	Semi final	
14 April 2017	Brittany	Romania	**12-14**	3rd Place game	

- German wins in **bold**.

=== Positions ===
The team's final positions in the European championship:

Year	Division	Tier	Place
2004			
2005	Division A	II	4th
2006	Division A	II	4th
2007	Division A	II	2nd
2008	Division A	II	3rd
2009	Division A	II	1st — Promoted
2010	Elite Division	I	6th
2011	Division A	II	4th
2012	Division A	II	2nd
2013	Division A	II	4th
2014	Division A	II	5th
2015	Division A	II	3rd
2016	Elite Division	I	6th
2017	Division A	II	4th
2018	Division A	II	1st - Promoted
