= 2024 U18 International Series =

International rugby union competition

- Date: 12–20 August 2024
- Champions: South Africa U18
- Matches played: 6
- Tries scored: 39 (average 6.5 per match)
- Top point scorer: Jack Deegan (19)
- Top try scorer: Conor O’Shaughnessy (4)

The 2024 U18 International Series is an international schools rugby union competition, part of the Under-18 International Series. The 2024 series was held in South Africa between 12 August and 20 August 2024. It featured under-18 national teams from South Africa, England, France, Georgia, and Ireland.

South Africa’s U18 team dominated the round-robin fixtures, winning all their matches against France, Ireland, and England. The competition showcased the strength of South Africa’s youth development system, with highly competitive matches across all five nations.

== Competition rules and information ==
Each team played three matches as round-robin. Unfortunately, The French U18 Team had to withdraw from this years' series due to the very unfortunate tragedy that occurred. Rankings were determined by total log points, then points difference (points scored minus points conceded). There were no semi-finals or finals; the overall winner was the team with the highest points at the end of the tournament.

== Teams ==
Locations of European U18 teams

The teams that played in the 2024 U18 International Series are:

2024 U18 International Series teams
Team	Country
South Africa U18	South Africa
England U18	England
Georgia U18	Georgia
Ireland U18	Ireland

== Series summary ==
South Africa went unbeaten across all three matches in the series, demonstrating a dominant performance against top European and Georgian youth teams. The round-robin format ensured that each team played competitive matches against multiple nations, highlighting the growing standard of U18 international rugby in South Africa.

== Final standings ==
The final log for the 2024 U18 International Series was:

2024 U18 International Series standings
Pos	Team	P	W	L	PF	PA	PD
1	South Africa U18	3	3	0	97	43	+54
2	Ireland U18	3	2	1	85	81	+3
3	England U18	3	1	2	69	101	-32
4	Georgia U18	3	0	3	38	64	−26

== Matches ==
The results from the 2024 Under-18 International Series were:

12 August 2024

South Africa 'A'	20–03	Georgia
Try: Dylan Miller, Brooklyn Newman; Con: Luan Giliomee(2); Pen: Luan Giliomee(2)	Report	Pen: Gigi Sirbiladze(1)

Stellenberg High School,
Cape Town

12 August 2024

Ireland	42–28	England
Try: Luke McLaughlin, Jack Deegan (2), Josh Gibson, Brian O’Flaherty, Conor O’Shaughnessy; Con: Tom Wood (4), Conor O’Shaughnessy (2)	Report	Try: Noah Caluori, Tom Davis, Victor Worsnip, George Newman; Con: James Linegar (4)

Stellenberg High School,
Cape Town

16 August 2024

South Africa	38–26	Ireland
Try: Markus Muller, Zekhethelo Siyaya(2), Sethu Mnebelele, Cheswill Jooste; Con: Yaqeen Ahmed(3), Akahluwa Boqwana(2); Pen: Vusi Moyo(1)	Report	Try: Conor Magee(2), Jack Deegan, Jamie Conway; Con: Tom Wood(1), Conor O’Shaughnessy (2)

Paarl Gimnasium,
Paarl

16 August 2024

Georgia	20-27	England
Try: Nikolozi Khalvashi, Givi Soselia, Saba Sharvashidze; Con: Levani Butskhrikidze; Pen: Levani Butskhrikidze	Report	Try: Noah Caluori, Reuben Thomas, Fraser Rawlins (2); Con: Finn Keylock (3)

Paarl Gimnasium,
Paarl

20 August 2024

South Africa	39–14	England
Try: Khuthadzo Rasivhaga, Reuben Kruger, Cheswill Jooste(2), Elgernon Meyer; Con: Vusi Moyo(2), Yaqeen Ahmed(2); Pen: Vusi Moyo(2)	Report	Try: George Newman, Connor Treacey; Con: James Linegar(2)

Paarl Gimnasium,
Paarl

20 August 2024

Ireland	17-15	Georgia
Try: Joe Finn, Jack Deegan; Con: Conor O’Shaughnessy (2); Pen: Conor O’Shaughnessy	Report	Try: Anri Shvelidze (2); Con: Gigi Sirbiladze; Pen: Gigi Sirbiladze

Paarl Gimnasium,
Paarl

== Standouts ==
The standouts for the 2024 U18 International Rugby Series were as follows:

2024 Top Performers
Top side:	SA Schools
Top Points Scorer:	Conor O’Shaughnessy (19 points), Ireland U18
Top try Scorer:	Jack Deegan (4 tries), Ireland U18
