= 2023 U18 International Series =

International rugby union competition

- Date: 11–19 August 2023
- Champions: England U18
- Matches played: 5
- Tries scored: 53 (average 10.6 per match)
- Top point scorer: Diego Jurd (27 points)
- Top try scorer: Dom Hanson (3); Jack Bracken (3); Angus Hall (3); Tom Leveque (3)

The 2023 U18 International Series is an international schools rugby union competition, part of the Under-18 International Series. The 2023 series was held in South Africa between 11 August and 19 August 2023. It featured under-18 national teams from South Africa, England, France, and a local SA Western Province side.

== Teams ==
Locations of European U18 teams

The teams that played in the 2023 U18 International Series are:

2023 U18 International Series teams
Team	Country
South Africa U18	South Africa
England U18	England
France U18	France
Western Province U18	South Africa

== Series summary ==
The 2023 series featured a round-robin format in which each team played three matches against the other participating nations. England finished with a 2–1 record, while South Africa secured victory in their final fixture with a 33–19 win over England. The competition provided valuable international experience for emerging under-18 players and highlighted the competitive standard of youth rugby between South Africa and leading European sides.

== Final standings ==
The final log for the 2023 U18 International Series was:

2023 U18 International Series standings
Pos	Team	P	W	L	PF	PA	PD
1	England U18	3	2	1	150	34	+116
2	France U18	3	2	1	112	85	+27
3	South Africa U18	2	1	1	57	56	+1
4	Western Province XV U18	2	0	2	35	161	−126

== Matches ==
The results from the 2023 Under-18 International Series were:

11 August 2023

England	41–00	France
Try: Kepueli Tuipulotu, Angus Hall (2), Charlie Griffin (2), Billy Sela, Finlay Wiseman; Con: Ollie Davies (3)	Report

Stellenberg High School,
Durbanville

15 August 2023

South Africa	24–37	France
Try: Haashim Pead(2), Janco Purchase, Luyanda Kunene; Con: Dominic Malgas(2)	Report	Try: Temanatua Boichot, Charly Mignot, Eliott Duthil, Gabin Garault; Con: Diego Jurd(3), Luka Keletaona; Pen: Diego Jurd(3)

Stellenberg High School,
Durbanville

15 August 2023

Western Province U18 XV	15–76	England
Try: HB Odendaal, Frank Hitimane; Con: Marno Pretorius; Pen: Marno Pretorius	Report	Try: Finlay Wiseman, Louie Platt, Dom Hanson (3), Sam Graham, Jack Bracken (3), Charlie West, Angus Hall, Finn Newton; Con: Louie Platt (7), Ollie Davies

Stellenberg High School,
Durbanville

19 August 2023

South Africa	33–19	England
Try: JC Mars, Gino Cupido, Cheswill Jooste, JJ Theron, Scott Nel; Con: Kyle Smith(4)	Report	Try: Junior Kpoku, Nick Lilley, Toby Baker; Con: Angus Hall(2)

Paarl Boys' High School,
Paarl

19 August 2023

Western Province U18 XV	20–85	France
Try: Dean Janse van Rensburg, Freek De Kock (2); Con: Frank Hitimane; Pen: Daniel van der Merwe	Report	Try: Ellyjah Ibsaiene, Quentin Valentino (2), Tom Leveque (3), Tom Emery (2), Temanatua Boichot, Pargade Ruben-Diego, Eduard-Junior Jabea Njocke, Melvyn Rates (2); Con: Luka Keletaona (4), Diego Jurd (6)

Stellenberg High School,
Durbanville

== Standouts ==
The standouts for the 2023 U18 International Rugby Series were as follows:

2023 Top Performers
Top side:	England U18
Top Points Scorer:	Diego Jurd (27 points), France U18
Top try Scorer:	Dom Hanson (3), England U18; Jack Bracken (3), England U18; Angus Hall (3), England U18; Tom Leveque (3), France U18
