= Tim Menzel =

- Born: Tim Menzel; 1 January 1992 (age 34)
- Height: 1.69 m (5 ft 7 in)
- Weight: 71 kg (11 st 3 lb; 157 lb)

Rugby union career
- Position: Scrum-half
Senior career
| Years | Team | Apps | (Points) |
| 2008 | TSV Handschuhsheim | | |
| 2008-2011 | US Colomiers | | |
| 2011- | TSV Handschuhsheim | | |
International career
| Years | Team | Apps | (Points) |
| 2010- | Germany | 28 | (6) |
- Correct as of 27 August 2018

Tim Menzel (born 1 January 1992) is a German international rugby union player, playing for the TSV Handschuhsheim in the Rugby-Bundesliga and the German national rugby union team.

He made his debut for Germany in an ENC match against Poland on 20 November 2010.

Menzel began his rugby career in 1998 and has since played for TSV Handschuhsheim and French club US Colomiers. He has also fielded in the German national under-18 rugby union team in the European Under-18 Rugby Union Championship in 2009 and 2010.

After three years in France, Mentzel returned to his former club in Germany for the 2011-12 season.

== Stats ==
Tim Menzel's personal statistics in club and international rugby:

=== Club ===
| Year | Club | Division | Games | Tries | Con | Pen | DG | Place |
|---|---|---|---|---|---|---|---|---|
| 2010-11 | US Colomiers | Rugby Pro D2 | 0 | 0 | 0 | 0 | 0 | |
| 2011-12 | TSV Handschuhsheim | Rugby-Bundesliga | 16 | 3 | 0 | 1 | 0 | 5th |

- As of 30 April 2012

=== National team ===
==== European Nations Cup ====
| Year | Team | Competition | Games | Points | Place |
|---|---|---|---|---|---|
| 2010–2012 | Germany | European Nations Cup Division 1B | 6 | 0 | 4th |
| 2012–2014 | Germany | European Nations Cup Division 1B | 1 | 0 | ongoing |

==== Friendlies & other competitions ====
| Year | Team | Competition | Games | Points |
|---|---|---|---|---|
| 2010 | Germany | Friendly | 1 | 0 |

- As of 28 April 2013
