= Oskar Rixen =

German rugby union player

- Born: 9 February 2002 (age 24) Berlin, Germany
- Height: 2.04 m (6 ft 8 in)
- Weight: 118 kg (18 st 8 lb; 260 lb)

Rugby union career
- Position: Lock
- Current team: Brive
Youth career
- 2012–2019: Berliner RC
- 2019–2022: Stade Français Espiors
Senior career
| Years | Team | Apps | (Points) |
| 2022- | Brive | 16 | (0) |
- Correct as of 18 January 2024
International career
| Years | Team | Apps | (Points) |
| 2017 | Germany U16s | | |
| 2019 | Germany U18s | | |
- Correct as of 18 January 2024

Oskar Rixen (born 9 February 2002) is a German rugby union player who plays for Brive in the Pro D2.

== Career ==
=== Club ===
Rixen began his career at Rugby-Bundesliga side Berliner RC. In 2019 he joined French side Stade Français espoirs squad.

In the summer of 2022 Rixen joined then Top14 side Brive, going on to make his debut in the third round coming off the bench in a loss to Montpellier. He became the 4th German to play professional rugby in the Top14.

=== International ===
He represented Germany at under-16 and under-18. Playing in the 2019 Rugby Europe Under-18 Championship.
