= Georgia national under-18 rugby union team =

Georgia under-18
- Union: Georgia Rugby Union
- Nickname: Baby lelos
- Coach: Giorgi Nemsadze
- Captain: Luka Saghinadze
Team kit	Change kit

The Georgia national under-18 rugby union team is the under-18 team of the Georgia national rugby union team in the sport of rugby union.

== History ==
Under-18 became a recognised age-grade in European rugby in 2004.

== Wins against Tier 1 nations ==
2009	Georgia	18–3	Italy	Toulon, France

2012	Georgia	20–18	Italy	Madrid, Spain

2013	Georgia	17–12	Italy	Grenoble, France

31 March 2018	France	3–8	Georgia	Poznań, Poland
15:50 CET (UTC+01)	Pen: Idjellidaine 12'	report	Try: Karkadze 8' m Pen: Lomidze 69'	Referee: J. Lewars ( England)

3 April 2024	Georgia	20–19	France	Stadio Sergio Lanfranchi, Parma, Italy
14:30 CET (UTC+01)	Try: Ezieshvili 23'; Shvelidze 70'; Con: Tsiklauri 24'; Sirbiladze 70'; Pen: Tsiklauri 13', 46'	report	Try: Elissalde 9'; Cazemajou 17'; Ibsaine 29'; Con: Drault 10', 30	Referee: Diogo Inacio (Portugal)

8 August 2025	Georgia	35–31	England	South Africa
		report

== Current squad ==
Georgian squad for 2025 U18 Rugby Europe Championship.
Head Coach: (Georgia (country)) Zurab Amonashvili

Pos	Name	Club
Hooker	Luka Barbakadze	(Georgia (country)) RC Aia Kutaisi
Hooker	Saba Mshvildadze	(Georgia (country)) Khvamli Tbilisi
Prop	Gocha Pitskhelauri	(Georgia (country)) RC Kazbegi
Prop	Giorgi Berdzenishvili	(France) RC Toulon Espoirs
Prop	Luka Tsiklauri	(Georgia (country)) Khvamli Tbilisi
Prop	Iago Ghudushauri	(Georgia (country)) RC Locomotive Tbilisi
Lock	Andria Bilanishvili	(Georgia (country)) Lelo Saracens
Lock	Nikoloz Chkhortolia	(France) Montpellier Espoirs
Lock	Saba Giorgidze	(Georgia (country)) Lelo Saracens
Flanker	Giorgi Ardzenadze	(Georgia (country)) RC Poti
Flanker	Giorgi Kevanishvili	(Georgia (country)) RC Aia Kutaisi
Flanker	Luka Shulaia	(Georgia (country)) Lelo Saracens
Flanker	Mate Beruashvili	(Georgia (country)) RC Locomotive Tbilisi
Flanker	Giorgi Zazadze	(Georgia (country)) RC Rustavi Kharebi
Scrum-half	Alexandre Gagua	(Georgia (country)) Khvamli Tbilisi
Scrum-half	Goga Ushveridze	(Georgia (country)) RC Aia Kutaisi
Fly-half	Levan Butskhrikidze	(Georgia (country)) Lelo Saracens
Fly-half	Mate Makharadze	(Georgia (country)) RC Batumi
Center	Giorgi Gabunia	(Georgia (country)) Lelo Saracens
Center	Data Akhvlediani	(Georgia (country)) Lelo Saracens
Center	Giorgi Kekelia	(Georgia (country)) RC Locomotive Tbilisi
Center	Luka Tabatadze	(Georgia (country)) RC Army Tbilisi
Winger	Giorgi Mushkudiani	(Georgia (country)) RC Aia Kutaisi
Winger	Avtandil Zviadadze	(Georgia (country)) RC Aia Kutaisi
Full-back	Davit Arobelidze	(Georgia (country)) RC Army Tbilisi
Full-back	Luka Tchakua	(Georgia (country)) Lelo Saracens

=== European Championship ===
The Georgian team has been a regular competitor at the European Under-18 Rugby Union Championship, playing in the A division with moderate success for the most part. The team's greatest achievement came in 2010 when it finished third, behind France and Ireland, beating Belgium in the third-place game. In 2011, a revamped competition saw the creation of an Elite division, with Georgia once more coming third, now in the tier-two First division, behind Scotland and Italy.

== European championship ==
=== Elite Division 2012 ===
Quarter-finals
Ireland	34
Portugal	24
France	19
Scotland	7
Wales	41
Italy	8
England	58
Georgia	8

Semi-finals
Ireland	22
France	20
Wales	16
England	22

Final
Ireland	13
England	25

play-off games
1	Georgia	20
2	Italy	18

5th place
1	Scotland	29
2	Georgia	10

Pos	Elite Division 2012
1	England
2	Ireland
3	France
4	Wales
5	Scotland
6	Georgia
7	Italy
8	Portugal

=== Elite Division 2013 ===
Quarter-finals
England	82
Portugal	8
Wales	17
Scotland	18
France	32
Italy	0
Ireland	31
Georgia	27

Semi-finals
England	25
Scotland	12
France	23
Ireland	18

Final
England	27
France	22

play-off games
1	Georgia	17
2	Italy	12

5th place
1	Wales	50
2	Georgia	0

Pos	Elite Division 2013
1	England
2	France
3	Ireland
4	Scotland
5	Wales
6	Georgia
7	Italy
8	Portugal

=== Elite Division 2014 ===
Quarter-finals
England	62
Portugal	5
Wales	23
Scotland	21
France	29
Italy	7
Ireland	20
Georgia	10

Semi-finals
England	11
Wales	9
France	11
Ireland	24

Final
England	30
Ireland	14

play-off games
1	Georgia	13
2	Italy	15

7th place
1	Georgia	26
2	Portugal	3

Pos	Elite Division 2014
1	England
2	Ireland
3	Wales
4	France
5	Scotland
6	Italy
7	Georgia
8	Portugal

=== Elite Division 2015 ===
Quarter-finals
England	85
Portugal	5
France	22
Scotland	10
Georgia	8
Ireland	8
Italy	14
Wales	13

Semi-finals
England	19
France	23
Georgia	6
Italy	6

Final
France	57
Georgia	0

Pos	Elite Division 2015
1	France
2	Georgia
3	England
4	Italy
5	Wales
6	Portugal
7	Ireland
8	Scotland

=== Positions ===
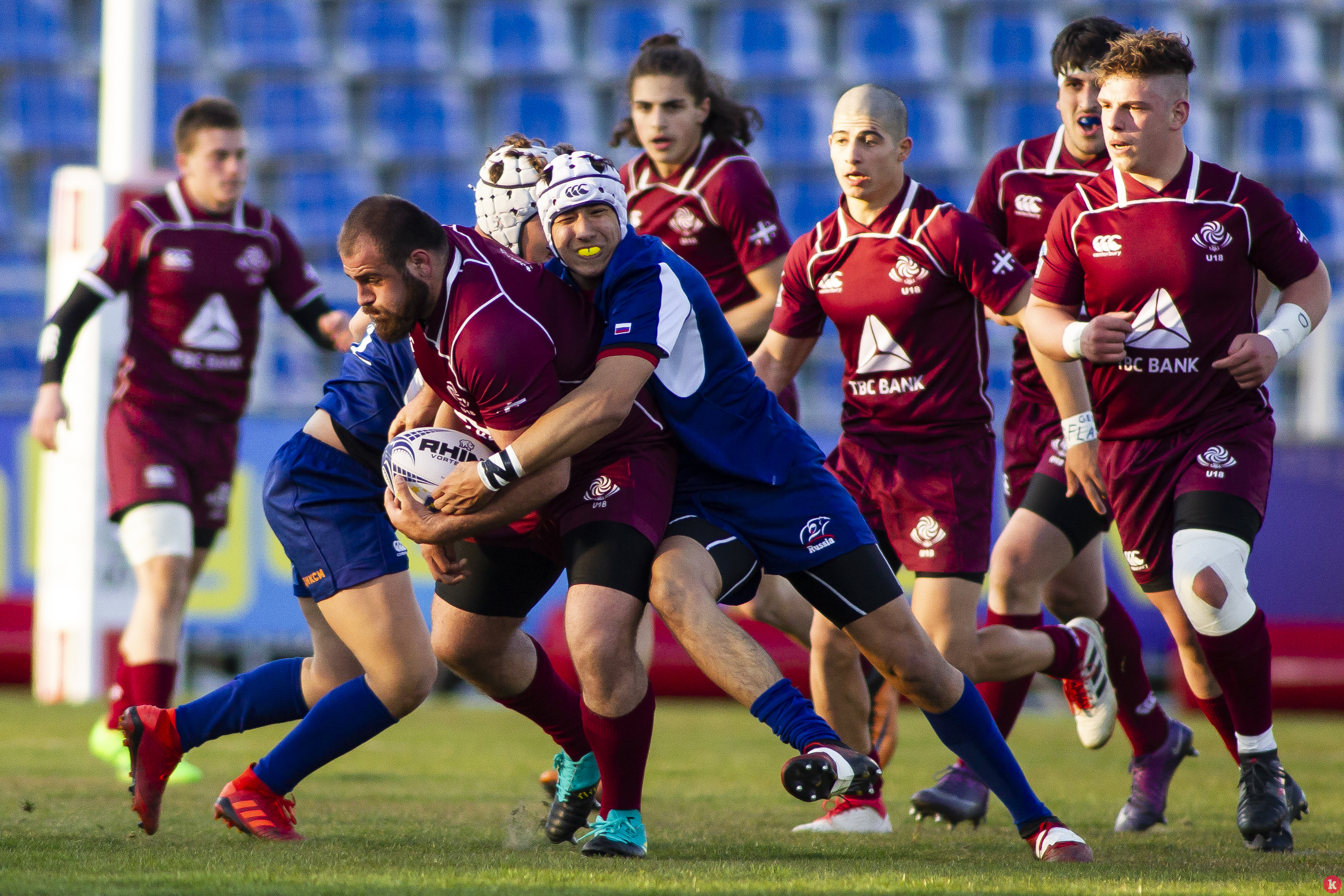
Russia U18 - Georgia U18, Rugby Europe 2018-2019

The team's final positions in the European championship:

Year	Division	Tier	Place
2004			
2005	A Division	I	5th
2006	A Division	I	6th
2007	A Division	I	6th
2008	A Division	I	6th
2009	A Division	I	7th
2010	A Division	I	3rd
2011	First Division	II	3rd
2012	Division Elite		6th
2013	Division Elite		6th
2014	Division Elite		7th
2015	Division Elite		2nd
2016	Division Elite		2nd
2017	Division Elite		2nd
2018	Division Elite		1st
2019	Division Elite		1st
2021	Division Elite		1st
2022	Division Elite		1st
2023	Division Elite		1st
2024	Division Elite		1st
2025	Division Elite		2nd

== Six Nations U18 Festival ==
=== 2024 ===
On 15 February 2024 Georgian Rugby Union announced that they were invited to Six Nations U18 festival, where they will play against Scotland, France and England.

Date	Opponent	Result	Venue
2024-03-30	Scotland	14 - 22	Stadio Sergio Lanfranchi, Italy
2024-04-03	France	20 - 19	Stadio Sergio Lanfranchi, Italy
2024-04-07	England	19 - 26	Stadio Sergio Lanfranchi, Italy

=== 2025 ===
On 4 February 2025 Georgian Rugby Union announced that they will play against Italy, Wales and Ireland.

Date	Opponent	Result	Venue
2025-04-10	Italy	24 - 37	Vichy, France
2025-04-14	Wales	10 - 17	Vichy, France
2025-04-18	Ireland	21 - 26	Vichy, France

=== 2026 ===
On 14 January 2026 Georgian Rugby Union announced that they will play against Scotland, France and England.

Date	Opponent	Result	Venue
2026-04-03	France		Vichy, France
2026-04-07	England		Vichy, France
2026-04-11	Scotland		Vichy, France

== See also ==
- Georgia national rugby union team
- Georgia national under-20 rugby union team
