= France national under-18 rugby union team =

France
- Union: French Rugby Federation
- Emblem: the Gallic rooster
- Coach: Jean-Marc Bederede
Team kit

The France national under-18 rugby union team is the under-18 side of the France national rugby union team in the sport of rugby union.

== History ==
Under-18 became a recognised age-grade in European rugby in 2004.

=== European Championship ===
The French Under-18 team has been competing in the European Under-18 Rugby Union Championship since 2004, when it was first held. In seven editions since, the team has won the final five times and played as the losing side in the other two, going out to England on both occasions.

The French side beat Ireland 27-3 in the 2010 edition of the tournament, marking its fifth title and its fourth in a row. France had a disappointing 2011 tournament, missing the final for the first time, failing to win a game and finishing only fourth.

== Honours ==
- European Under-18 Rugby Union Championship
  - Champions: 2004, 2007, 2008, 2009, 2010, 2015
  - Runners-up: 2005, 2006, 2018

== European championship ==
=== Results ===
France's recent results at the European Championship:

2009 European championship – Division A
Date	Location	Opposition	Result	Round
2009		Belgium	**59-9**	Quarter finals
2009		Romania	**78-3**	Semi finals
2009	Toulon	England	**20-19**	Final

2010 European championship – Division A
Date	Location	Opposition	Result	Round
20 March 2010	Casale sul Sile	Italy	**50-10**	Quarter finals
31 March 2010	San Donà di Piave	Belgium	**21-0**	Semi finals
3 April 2010	Treviso	Ireland	**27-3**	Final

2011 European championship – First Division
Date	Location	Opposition	Result	Round
16 April 2011	Auch	Ireland	17-19	Semi finals
23 April 2011	Tarbes	Wales	6-15	3rd Place game

- French victories in **bold**.

=== Positions ===
The team's final positions in the European championship:

Year	Division	Tier	Place
2004	A Division	I	1st — Champions
2005	A Division	I	2nd — Runners-up
2006	A Division	I	2nd — Runners-up
2007	A Division	I	1st — Champions
2008	A Division	I	1st — Champions
2009	A Division	I	1st — Champions
2010	A Division	I	1st — Champions
2011	Elite Division	I	4th
