= 2011 European Under-18 Rugby Union Championship =

Tournament details
- Host nation: France
- Dates: 15 April 2011 – 24 April 2011
- No. of nations: 28

Final positions
- Champions: Ireland
- Runner-up: England

Tournament statistics
- Matches played: 40

The 2011 European Under-18 Rugby Union Championship was the eighth annual international rugby union competition for Under 18 national rugby union teams in Europe. The event was organised by rugby's European governing body, the FIRA – Association of European Rugby (FIRA-AER). The competition was contested by 28 men's junior national teams and will be held in April 2011. It was hosted by the French region of Armagnac and Bigorre. The tournament was won by the under-18 team of Ireland, who took out the title for the first time, beating England in the final. For the first time, France did not reach the championship game and finished in fourth place only.

The tournament's defending champion was France, who had won five European championships and the last four in a row. The 2011 edition of the competition saw the introduction of an elite division, above division one, made up of four teams, France, England, Wales and Ireland. The divisions below remained unchanged. It marked the first time that all countries participating in the Six Nations Championship send a team to the European championship.

It was sponsored by French company Justin Bridou and therefore officially called the 2011 Justin Bridou European Under-18 Rugby Union Championship.

== Overview ==
=== History ===
The European Under-18 Rugby Union Championship was first held in 2004, in Treviso, Italy. It replaced the previously held European Under-18 Emergent Nations Championship, which had first been held in 2000. The first championship in 2004 was won by France.

The following two championships, held in Lille, France, in 2005 and again in Treviso in 2006, were won by England. Alternating between France and Italy, the next four championships were held in Biarritz, Treviso again, Toulon and once more in Treviso in 2010. All four were won by France, but of Europe's top rugby playing nations, England, Wales and Scotland did not take part in the 2010 edition.

=== Format ===
The 2011 edition saw the introduction of an Elite division, consisting of four teams, two of which, England and Wales, had not taken part in the 2010 competition or, in the case of Wales, never taken part in the European championship.

Below the elite level, the championship was organised in First, Second and Third Divisions, with First being the highest and Third the lowest. Each division consisted of eight teams and each team played three competition games, with a quarter-final, semi-final and final/placing game. The quarter-finals were played according to a seeding list, with the winners moving on to the first to fourth place semi-finals while the losers would enter the fifth to eighth place semi-finals.

The winner of the Elite division, Ireland, was crowned European champions while the fourth placed team was to be relegated to the First division. Similarly, the winner of the Second and Third divisions would move up a division for 2012 while the last placed teams would be relegated.

To determine the four teams playing in the Elite Division, a qualifying tournament was held between the Six Nations U-18 sides in late February and early March, with the teams drawn into two groups of three teams each. France and England won their groups, with Wales and Ireland finishing second, qualifying all four teams for the Elite Division. Italy and Scotland finished third, placing them in the First Division. For Italy, this was still a bonus as it obtained the second seed for the division, behind Scotland. After an unsuccessful 2010 tournament, where the team had finished only fifth, it would have been entitled to only the fifth seed otherwise. Scotland made a return to the European championship for the first time since 2006.

=== Venues ===
The games of the 2011 championship were played at venues in Armagnac and Bigorre, two regions in southern France. The first round of games in all divisions except the elite one was played on 16 April 2011. The elite division played their first games in Auch the following day. The second round was played on 19 April while the finals for all divisions were held on 22 and 23 April, with Division two and three playing on the 22 and the Elite and First Division on the 23.

The venues for the Elite Group where:

- Auch
- Tarbes

The venues for the first round were:

- Condom
- Eauze
- Fleurance
- Lombez
- Magnoac
- Vic-en-Bigorre

The venues for the second round were:

- Gimont
- Lourdes
- Masseube
- Miélan
- Ossun
- Vic-Fezensac

The venues for the third round were:

- Bagnères
- Capvern
- L'Isle-Jourdain
- Laloubère
- Lannemezan
- Louey
- Sémléac

=== D Division ===
The D division forms the fourth level, below the Third division, of European Under-18 rugby. In 2011, only three teams compete at this level, at a separate tournament. It consists of the teams of Israel, Croatia and Bosnia & Herzegovina. The tournament was held independently of the other divisions on 14 April at Sinj, Croatia and won by the home nation.

== Teams and standings ==
The participating teams and their divisions are in order of their ranking after the tournament:

Pos	Elite Division
1	Ireland
2	England
3	Wales
4	France

Pos	First Division
1	Scotland
2	Italy
3	Georgia
4	Germany
5	Portugal
6	Belgium
7	Romania
8	Russia

Pos	Second Division
1	Spain
2	Sweden
3	Lithuania
4	Czech Republic
5	Poland
6	Ukraine
7	Netherlands
8	Switzerland

Pos	Third Division
1	Serbia
2	Hungary
3	Luxembourg
4	Latvia
5	Moldova
6	Denmark
7	Bulgaria
8	Austria

Pos	D Division
1	Croatia
2	Bosnia and Herzegovina
3	Israel

== Games ==
The scheduled games:

=== Elite Division ===
The games of the elite division:

Semi-finals
1	France	17
4	Ireland	19
2	England	38
3	Wales	34

Final
4	Ireland	17
2	England	8

3rd Place Final
1	France	6
3	Wales	15

=== First Division ===
The games of the first division:

==== Championship ====
Quarter-finals
1	Scotland	65
8	Romania	3
4	Belgium	11
5	Germany	27
2	Italy	14
7	Portugal	3
3	Georgia	38
6	Russia	3

Semi-finals
1	Scotland	87
5	Germany	3
2	Italy	36
3	Georgia	16

Final
1	Scotland	17
2	Italy	12

3rd Place Final
3	Georgia	40
5	Germany	0

==== Relegation ====
Semi-finals
4	Belgium	19
8	Romania	6
6	Russia	7
7	Portugal	8

5th Place Final
4	Belgium	5
7	Portugal	10

7th Place Final
6	Russia	3
8	Romania	11

=== Second Division ===
The games of the second division:

==== Championship ====
Quarter-finals
1	Spain	50
8	Ukraine	0
4	Czech Republic	67
5	Switzerland	5
2	Netherlands	12
7	Sweden	18
3	Poland	10
6	Lithuania	12

Semi-finals
1	Spain	52
4	Czech Republic	20
7	Sweden	19
6	Lithuania	10

Final
1	Spain	47
7	Sweden	7

3rd Place Final
4	Czech Republic	12
6	Lithuania	15

==== Relegation ====
Semi-finals
2	Netherlands	17
3	Poland	27
5	Switzerland	5
8	Ukraine	31

5th Place Final
3	Poland	41
8	Ukraine	10

7th Place Final
2	Netherlands	34
5	Switzerland	0

=== Third Division ===
The games of the third division:

==== Championship ====
Quarter-finals
1	Hungary	66
8	Bulgaria	11
4	Luxembourg	51
5	Denmark	0
2	Serbia	13
7	Moldova	0
3	Latvia	15
6	Austria	11

Semi-finals
1	Hungary	27
4	Luxembourg	17
2	Serbia	12
3	Latvia	5

Final
1	Hungary	7
2	Serbia	13

3rd Place Final
3	Latvia	7
4	Luxembourg	12

==== Relegation ====
Semi-finals
5	Denmark	14
8	Bulgaria	13
6	Austria	0
7	Moldova	32

5th Place Final
5	Denmark	7
7	Moldova	25

7th Place Final
6	Austria	10
8	Bulgaria	15

== European Championship final ==
The European Championship final was held on 23 April at 18:30 at Tarbes and was broadcast live on Eurosport 2. The final was played in wet conditions and a well organised Ireland side went up 11–3 by half time. England's head coach, John Fletcher, conceded that it was a well-deserved Irish victory but that the game was an important lesson to learn and would help his players in their future development. For Ireland, which was, for the first time, represented by a schools team rather than a Club XV, captain Luke McGrath was the most influential figure on the field, scoring twelve points.

23 April 2011
18:30

Ireland	17–8	England
Try: McEllin 25'; Pen: McGrath (4) 4', 11', 58', 61'	Report	Try: Hepburn 66'; Pen: Slade 33'

Stade Maurice Trélut, Tarbes
Referee: Arnaud Blondel (France)

Ireland:
FB	15	Rory Scholes (substituted off) 15'
RW	14	Conor McEllin (substituted off) 67'
CT	13	Robbie Henshaw
SF	12	Chris Farrell
LW	11	Mark Roche
FF	10	Stuart Olding (substituted off) 68'
HB	9	Luke McGrath (c) (substituted off) 68'
N8	8	Ryan Murphy
OF	7	Dan Leavy
BF	6	Donagh Lawler
RL	5	Gavin Thornbury (substituted off) 40'
LL	4	Jerry Sexton (substituted off) 15'
TP	3	Ed Byrne
HK	2	Bryan Byrne
LP	1	Gordon Frayne (substituted off) 45'
Substitutes:
	16	Andrew Murphy
	17	Thomas Ferrari
	18	Christopher Taylor (substituted on) 45'
	19	Luke Satchwell (substituted on) 15'
	20	Mark Best
	21	Jack O'Neill (substituted on) 40'
	22	David Shanahan (substituted on) 68'
	23	Rory Scannell (substituted on) 68'
	24	Jack Fitzpatrick (substituted on) 24'
	25	Cian O'Halloran (substituted on) 67'
	26	Seamus Glynn
Coach:
Terry McMaster

England:
FB	15	Jack Nowell
RW	14	Tony Watson
CT	13	Mark Jennings
CT	12	Sam Hill
LW	11	Jack Arnott (substituted off) 50'
FH	10	Henry Slade (substituted off) 38'
SH	9	Alex Day (substituted off) 38'
N8	8	Jack Clifford
OF	7	Matt Hankin (substituted off) 50'
BF	6	David Sisi (substituted off) 45'
RL	5	Dominic Barrow (c)
LL	4	Tom Jubb
TP	3	Daniel Herriot (substituted off) 45'
HK	2	Nathan Morris (substituted off) 39'
LP	1	Alec Hepburn
Substitutions:
	16	Max Crumpton
	17	Tom Smallbone (substituted on) 45'
	18	Scott Spurling (substituted on) 39'
	19	Joe Robinson (substituted on) 45'
	20	Joe Buckle (substituted on) 50' (yellow card)
	21	James Lightfoot-Brown (substituted on) 38'
	22	Will Hooley (substituted on) 38'
	23	Marcus Webber (substituted on) 50'
	24	Tom Stephenson
Coach:
John Fletcher
