= 34th Infantry Regiment (France) =

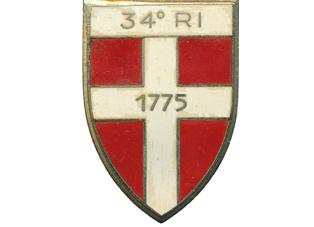
Regimental badge of the 34nd Infantry Regiment (France)

The 34th Infantry Regiment was a French infantry regiment created during the French Revolution out of the Angoulême Regiment of the Ancien Régime.

== Names ==
- 29 April 1625 : raised as the régiment de Plessis-Joigny
- 26 May 1626 : re-formed
- 28 July 1627 : the régiment de Plessis-Joigny was re-formed
- October 1632 : renamed the régiment de Sainte-Offange
- 19 July 1635 : renamed the régiment de La Frézelière
- May 1636 : renamed the régiment de Touraine
- December 1650 : renamed the régiment d'Amboise
- 1653 : Renamed the régiment de Kercado
- 1 July 1654 : Renamed the régiment de Chambellay
- 1667 : Renamed the régiment de Montaigu
- 1673 : Renamed the régiment de Touraine
- 26 April 1775 : creation of the régiment de Savoie-Carignan out of the 2nd and 4th battalions of the Touraine Regiment
- 20 November 1785 : renamed the régiment d'Angoulême
- 1 January 1791 : renamed the 34th Line Infantry Regiment
- 1793 : Merged and renamed the 34th Demi-Brigade of the First Formation
- 1796 : Creation of the 34th Demi-Brigade of the Second Formation
- 1803 : Creation of the 34th Line Infantry Regiment
- 16 July 1815 : demobbed with the rest of Napoleon's army after the Hundred Days
- 11 August 1815 : creation of the Bas-Rhin Legion'
- 1820 : Bas-Rhin Legion merged and renamed the 34th Line Infantry Regiment
- 1887 : Renamed the 34th Infantry Regiment
- 1914 : Renamed the 234th Infantry Regiment' on mobilisation
- 1922 : Disbanded
- 1939 : Re-formed
- 1940 : Disbanded
- 1 January 1945 : Re-formed
- 30 November 1945 : Disbanded
- 1978 : Re-formed
- 29 November 1997 : Disbanded

== Veterans of the regiment ==
- Marcel Canguilhem (1895–1949), known as Cel le Gaucher, illustrator and sculptor
- Georges Babet (1890–1917), lieutenant killed on the Craonne plateau on 6 May 1917
- Jean Duclos (1895–1957), deputy
- Olivier-Hourcade (1892–1914), poet, killed at Oulches on 21 September 1914
- André Labat, sportsman
- Louis Lebrun (1769-1853), chef d'escadron, on 15 February 1791 became a private in the regiment
- Hugues Alexandre Joseph Meunier, general and later lieutenant-colonel
- Paul Soutiras (1893–1940), officer, killed in 1940.

== Bibliography (in French) ==
- Archives militaires du Château de Vincennes.
- Victor Belhomme (1902). Histoire de l'infanterie en France. Vol. 5. Henri Charles-Lavauzelle..
- Serge Andolenko (1969). Recueil d'historiques de l'infanterie française. Paris: Eurimprim. OCLC 23418405..
- Le 34e Régiment d'Infanterie de Ligne 1789-1815
- Aristide Martinien : Tableaux, par corps et par batailles, des officiers tués et blessés pendant les guerres de l'Empire (1805-1815)
- French Infantry Regiments and the Colonels who Led Them: 1791 to 1815
- Historiques des corps de troupe de l'armée française (1569-1900)
- Abel Hugo : France militaire: 1792-1837, Histoire des armées françaises de terre et de mer de 1792 à 1837 Tome 5
- Léon Galibert : Histoire de l'Algérie ancienne et moderne depuis les premiers establissements des Carthaginois jusques et y compris les dernières campagnes du général Bugeaud avec une introduction sur les divers systèmes de colonisation qui ont précède la conquête Française (1843)
- Jean-Baptiste Pébaÿ : Base Leonore des dossiers de la Légion d’honneur, dossiers nominatifs
