= Jacques Duclos =

French politician (1896–1975)

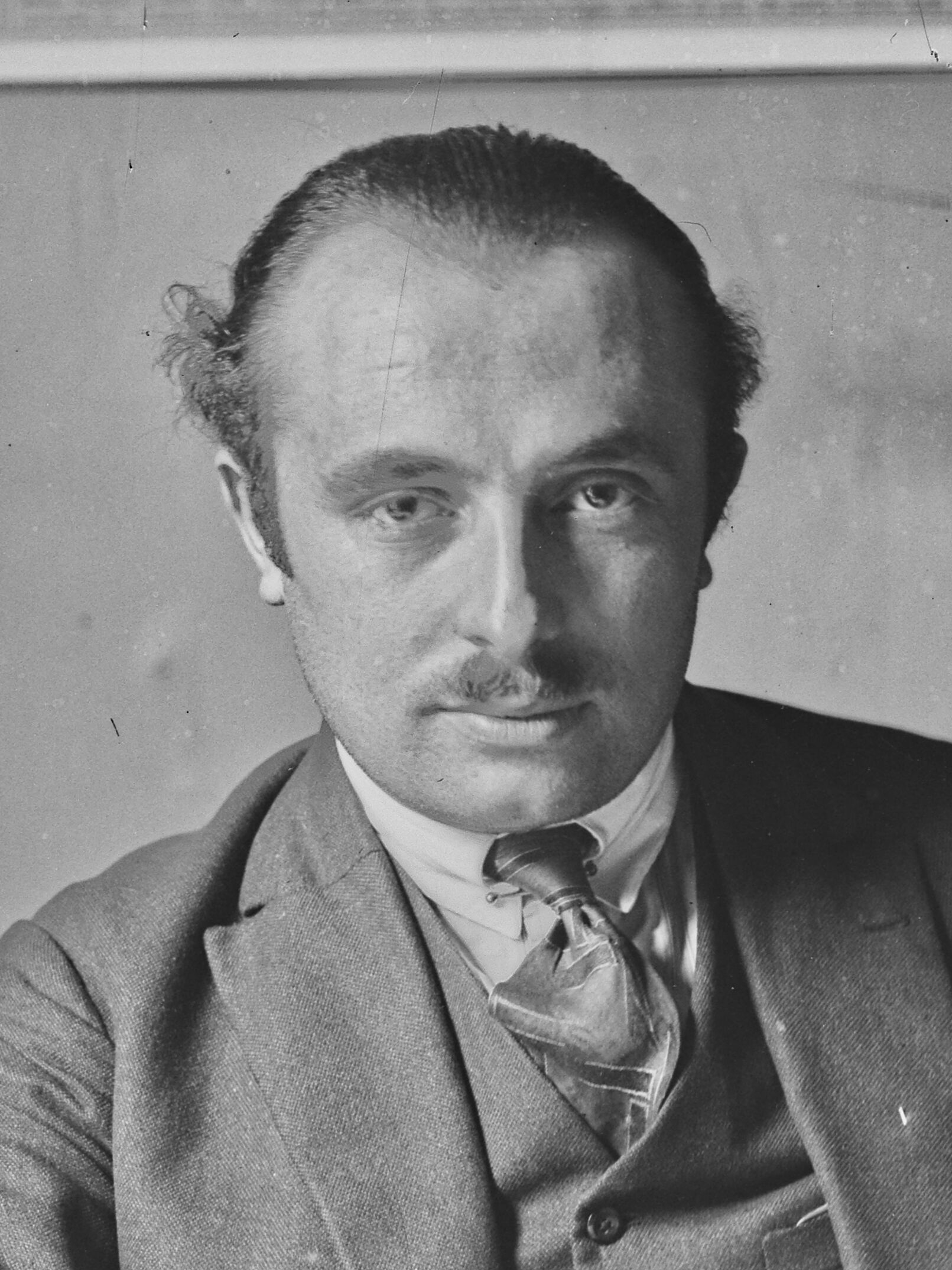
- Duclos in 1926

Assembly Member for 20th arrondissement of Paris
- In office 1 June 1928 – 31 May 1932
- Preceded by: Léon Blum

Personal details
- Born: 2 October 1896 Louey, Hautes-Pyrénées, French Third Republic
- Died: 25 April 1975 (aged 78) Montreuil, Seine-Saint-Denis, French Fifth Republic
- Resting place: Père Lachaise Cemetery
- Party: PCF
- Other political affiliations: National Front
- Height: 1.56 m (5 ft 1 in)
- Spouse: Gilberte Louise Roux
- Relations: Jean Duclos
- Parents: Antoine Duclos (father); Anne Louise Cazanave (mother)
- Occupation: Pastry chef

Military service
- Allegiance: French Third Republic
- Years of service: 1915–1919
- Battles/wars: Battle of Verdun

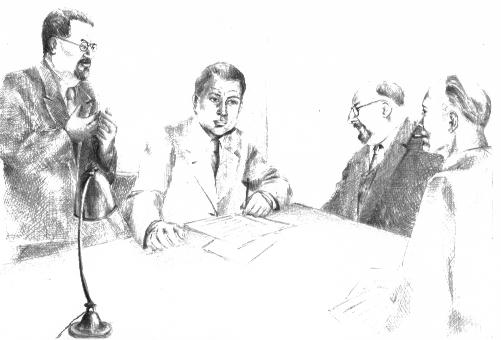
Meeting of the clandestine French Communist Party (PCF) central committee at Longjumeau, 1943. Duclos is second from right.

Jacques Duclos (French: [dyklo]; 2 October 1896 – 25 April 1975) was a French Communist politician and member of the Comintern. He played a key role in the politcs of France from 1926, when he entered the French National Assembly after defeating Paul Reynaud, to 1969, when he won a substantial portion of the vote in that year's presidential elections.

== Biography ==
Duclos was born in Louey, Hautes-Pyrénées, in to a strictly religious single-parent family. Duclos fought in the Battle of Verdun, where he was wounded. He was captured at the Chemin des Dames and remained a prisoner of war for the remainder of the war.

In 1920, he joined the newly-formed French Communist Party (PCF). He rose to the Central Committee in 1926 and defeated Léon Blum in the elections for deputy in the 20th arrondissement of Paris. He was named head of the propaganda section of the Party in 1936 and was elected to Vice-President of the French National Assembly.

A Stalinist, Duclos was for more than 35 years the brain behind political choices made by Maurice Thorez and Benoît Frachon. He was involved in the international communist movement, in the Comintern, and in the Cominform. In the 1930s, he was assigned the task of exerting "discipline" on the communist movements in Spain (1930 and 1935) and Belgium (1934–1935). On Joseph Stalin's orders, he advised the Communist Party of Spain to participate in the Popular Front at the outbreak of the Spanish Civil War.

In September 1939 the PCF was banned after the signature of the Molotov–Ribbentrop Pact and the French declaration of war on Germany because the party held the Stalinist line that the Allies were responsible for the war and that Nazi Germany was seeking peace. In October 1939, Duclos called for negotiations with Adolf Hitler, which led to increased repression of the party from the French state. Upon France's defeat in 1940, Duclos, the most senior PCF official in France, engaged in negotiations with the Nazi authorities with a view to legalising the Communist Party and requesting permission to restart publication of the party's daily, L'Humanité, which had been banned by the French government for the same reasons). The negotiations did not succeed but hurt the party's post-war credibility among part of the populace.

Duclos was the supervisor of the clandestine party throughout the German occupation (1940–1944) and, with Pierre Villon, took the initiative in creating the Front National resistance movement, which was the political front for the Francs-Tireurs et Partisans (FTP) guerrillas.

After 1950, Thorez's health faltered, but Duclos remained one of the most influential members of the Party. He was acting Secretary General from 1950 to 1953 in Thorez's absence and was instrumental in eliminating his rival André Marty from the party's leadership. Waldeck Rochet's own failing health prompted Duclos to run as the party's presidential candidate in the 1969 election. He scored 21.27% of the vote, the highest ever for a communist presidential candidate in France. He died in Montreuil on 25 April 1975 at age 78.

Party political offices
Preceded by Maurice Thorez	Acting Secretary General of the French Communist Party; 1950–53	Succeeded by Maurice Thorez
