= 2010 European Under-18 Rugby Union Championship =

Tournament details
- Host nation: Italy
- Dates: 27 March 2010 – 3 April 2010
- No. of nations: 24

Final positions
- Champions: France
- Runner-up: Ireland

Tournament statistics
- Matches played: 36

The 2010 European Under-18 Rugby Union Championship was the seventh annual international rugby union competition for Under 18 national rugby union teams in Europe. The event was organised by rugby's European governing body, the FIRA – Association of European Rugby (FIRA-AER). The competition was contested by 24 men's junior national teams and was held in late March and early April 2010. It was hosted by the Italian region of Veneto, with the final played at the home ground of Benetton Treviso.

The tournament was won by France, who won its fifth European championship and its fourth in a row, with Ireland finishing runners-up.

It was sponsored by French company Justin Bridou and therefore officially called the 2010 Justin Bridou European Under-18 Rugby Union Championship.

== Overview ==
=== History ===
The European Under-18 Rugby Union Championship was first held in 2004, in Treviso, Italy. It replaced the previously held European Under-18 Emergent Nations Championship, which had first been held in 2000. The first championship in 2004 was won by France.

The following two championships, held in Lille, France, in 2005 and again in Treviso in 2006, were won by England. Alternating between France and Italy, the next four championships were held in Biarritz, Treviso again, Toulon and once more in Treviso in 2010. All four were taken out by France, but of Europes top rugby playing nations, England, Wales and Scotland did not take part in the latest edition.

=== Format ===
The championship, similar to previous editions, was organised in an A, B and C Division, with A being the highest and C the lowest. Each division consisted of eight teams and each team played three competition games, with a quarter final, semi final and final/placing game.

The quarter finals were played according to a seeding list, with the winners moving on to the first to fourth place semi finals while the losers would enter the fifth to eighth place semi finals.

The winners of the semi-finals one to four would play in the division final while the losers would play for third place. Similarly, the winners of the fifth to eighth semi finals would play for fifth place while the losers would play for seventh.

The winner of the A division was crowned European champions while the eighth placed team would be relegated to the B division. Similarly, the winner of B and C division would move up a division for 2011 while the last placed teams would be relegated. This meant, France was crowned European champions while Romania finished on the relegation spot. Portugal won the B division and earned promotion while Ukraine was relegated and replaced by Sweden, the C champions.

=== Venues ===
The games of the 2010 championship were played at five different locations and stadiums:

- Casale sul Sile – Stadio Comunale Giovanni Eugenio
- Conegliano – Stadio Comunale
- San Donà di Piave – Stadio Mario e Romolo Pacifici
- San Michele al Tagliamento – Impianto sportivo Malafesta
- Treviso – Stadio Comunale di Monigo

=== Changes for 2011 ===
The 2011 edition of the championship is scheduled to see a return of the absent three home nations, England, Scotland and Wales. For this purpose, the A division will be enlarged to twelve teams, while B and C remain at their current strength.

=== D Division ===
The D division forms the fourth level, below the C division, of European Under-18 rugby. In 2010, only four teams compete at this level, at a tournament held at Chișinău, Moldova, from 19 to 22 May 2010. It consists of the teams of Moldova, Israel, Croatia and Norway.

== Teams and final standings ==
The participating teams and their final standings were:

Pos	A Division
1	France
2	Ireland
3	Georgia
4	Belgium
5	Italy
6	Germany
7	Russia
8	Romania

Pos	B Division
1	Portugal
2	Spain
3	Netherlands
4	Poland
5	Czech Republic
6	Switzerland
7	Lithuania
8	Ukraine

Pos	C Division
1	Sweden
2	Hungary
3	Serbia
4	Latvia
5	Luxembourg
6	Denmark
7	Austria
8	Bulgaria

Pos	D Division
1	Moldova
2	Croatia
3	Israel
4	Norway

== Games ==
The results of the games:

=== A Division ===
==== Championship ====
Quarter-finals
France	50
Italy	10
Belgium	27
Russia	14
Ireland	20
Germany	11
Romania	7
Georgia	25

Semi-finals
France	21
Belgium	0
Ireland	19
Georgia	11

Final
France	27
Ireland	3

3rd Place Final
1	Georgia	18
2	Belgium	15

==== Relegation ====
Semi-finals
1	Italy	13
4	Russia	8
3	Germany	44
2	Romania	0

5th Place Final
Italy	18
Germany	13

7th Place Final
1	Russia	34
2	Romania	12

=== B Division ===
==== Championship ====
Quarter-finals
Portugal	104
Switzerland	3
Netherlands	55
Ukraine	0
Spain	53
Czech Republic	5
Poland	23
Lithuania	7

Semi-finals
Portugal	25
Netherlands	10
Spain	26
Poland	3

Final
Portugal	43
Spain	3

3rd Place Final
1	Netherlands	42
2	Poland	8

==== Relegation ====
The Switzerland versus Ukraine game was tied after regular time and was decided by penalty kicks.

Semi-finals
1	Switzerland	16
4	Ukraine	16
3	Czech Republic	8
2	Lithuania	5

5th Place Final
Switzerland	3
Czech Republic	54

7th Place Final
1	Lithuania	21
2	Ukraine	5

=== C Division ===
==== Championship ====
Quarter-finals
Sweden	13
Austria	0
Denmark	5
Serbia	24
Hungary	21
Luxembourg	11
Bulgaria	0
Latvia	34

Semi-finals
Sweden	19
Serbia	9
Hungary	13
Latvia	0

Final
Sweden	30
Hungary	24

3rd Place Final
1	Serbia	14
2	Latvia	12

==== Relegation ====
The Denmark versus Austria game was tied after regular time and was decided by penalty kicks.

Semi-finals
1	Austria	12
4	Denmark	12
3	Luxembourg	8
2	Bulgaria	0

5th Place Final
Denmark	14
Luxembourg	29

7th Place Final
1	Austria	31
2	Bulgaria	3

=== D Division ===
Held at a different time and location as the other three divisions, in Moldova, these are the results:

Semi-finals
1	Moldova	90
4	Norway	0
3	Croatia	25
2	Israel	18

Final
Moldova	23
Croatia	5

3rd Place Final
1	Norway	0
2	Israel	76
