= Jean Duclos =

French politician

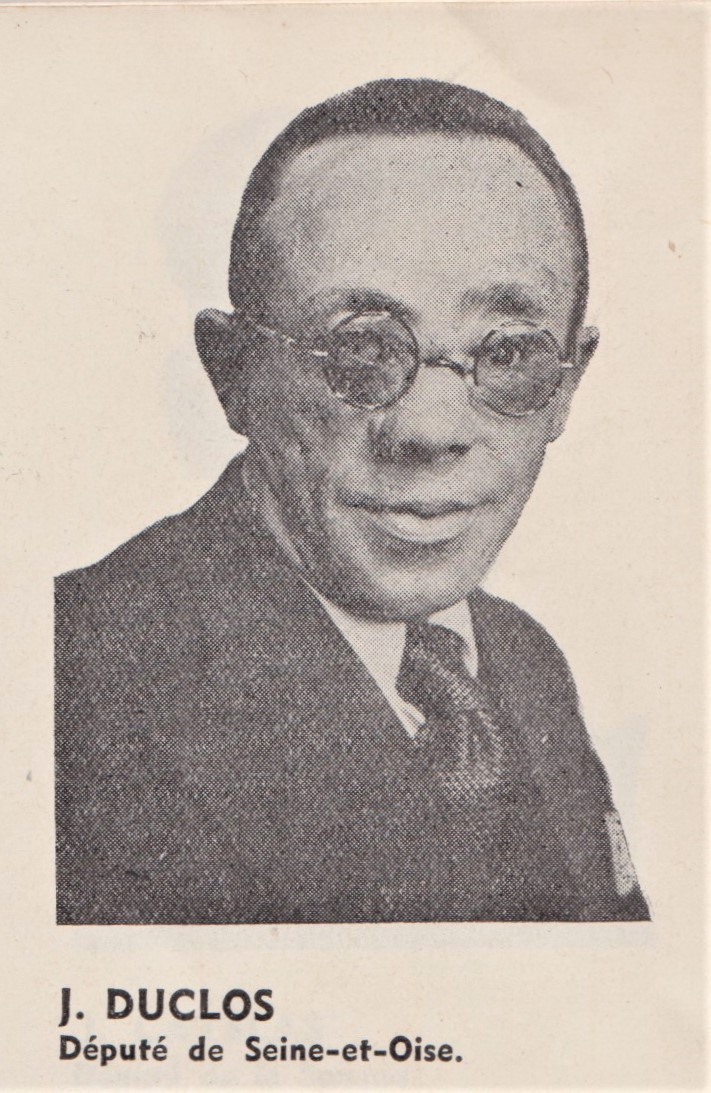
- Portrait of Duclos, published 1936
- Born: Jean Marie François Dominique Duclos; February 15, 1895; Louey, Hautes-Pyrénées, French Third Republic
- Died: June 27, 1957 (aged 62); Louey, Hautes-Pyrénées, French Fourth Republic
- Military career
- Allegiance: French Third Republic
- Units: 49th, 34th and 73rd regiments
- Conflicts: First Battle of Champagne; Battle of the Somme; Battle of Verdun
- Awards: Legion of Honour; Médaille militaire; Croix de guerre 1914–1918; Croix du mérite combattant
- Occupation: Horticulturist
- Political party: PCF
- Parents: Antoine Duclos (father); Anne Louise Cazanave (mother)
- Relatives: Jacques Duclos

Signature
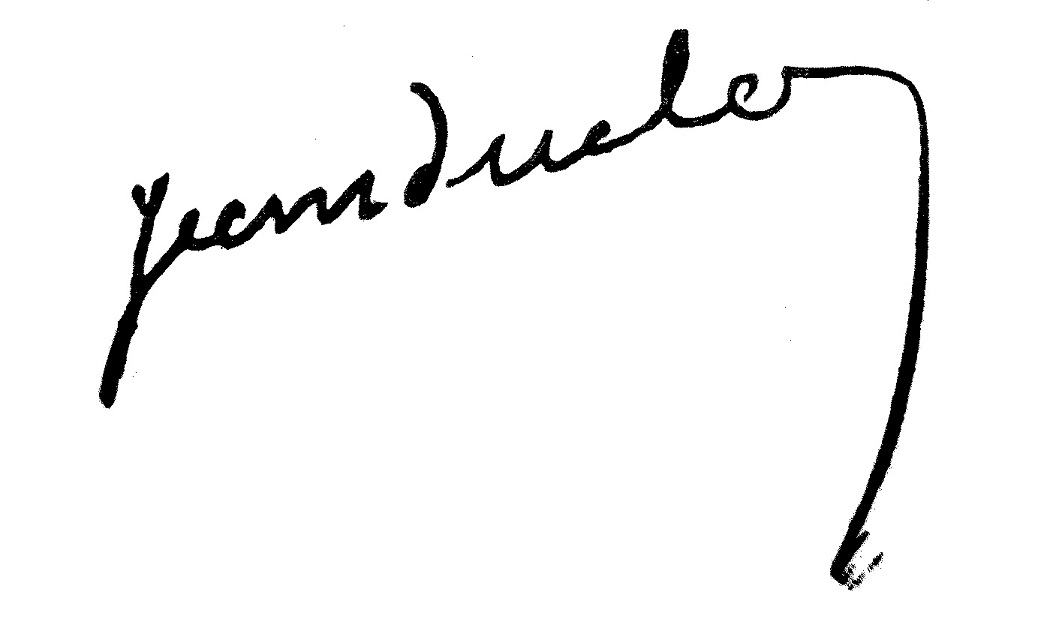

Jean Duclos was a French politician. Born in Louey (Hautes-Pyrénées) on 15 February 1895, he died there on 27 June 1957. Member of the French Communist Party, like his better known brother Jacques Duclos, he was deputy for Seine-et-Oise.

== Biographical elements ==
The original profession of Jean Duclos was horticulturist but, like many men of his generation, the First World War marked him morally as well as physically. Grievously wounded in September 1916, he retained for the rest of his life scars on his face and damaged vision. At the end of the war, decorated with the Légion d'honneur, Croix de Guerre, Médaille militaire, but invalided out with an invalidity rate of 100%, he could not perform his job. He adhered to two organisations: the Association républicaine des anciens combattants (ARAC) and the French Communist Party.
In 1926 he was elected General Secretary of the ARAC, the mass organisation where were found the former combatants of the left. He remained a national leader of this organisation up to 1951.

== Deputy for Seine-et-Oise ==
Candidate for deputy on several occasions presented by his party, he was designated for candidacy in the Fifth District of Versailles in Seine-et-Oise for the general elections of 1936. Leading in the first ballot with 7,353 votes out of 22,092 constituents as the Popular Front candidate benefitting from withdrawals from the left, he was elected on the second ballot with 12,640 votes, his opponent on the right receiving 9,142 votes. He was in the lead in three cantons: Versailles sud, Versailles ouest et Palaiseau.
Deposed in 1940, like most communist deputies, interned for several months, he was freed in 1941 and retired in his home province. He renewed his activities upon the Liberation of France, and was elected deputy for Seine-et-Oise after the electoral consultations of 1945, and June and November 1946. Having become rather blind, he was not a candidate in the elections of 1951.
In April–May 1945, he was elected the first deputy of the commune of Versailles.

== Sources ==
- Dictionnaire biographique du mouvement ouvrier français, le Maitron, Les éditions de l'Atelier, 1986, volume 26, notice rédigée par R. Balland.
- Brochure éditée en supplément du n° 12 des Cahiers du bolchévisme, La voix du peuple au parlement, 1936, présentant les 2 sénateurs et les 72 députés communistes. Page 155.
- Jacques Duclos, Mémoires, Éditions Fayard, tome 1, Paris 1969. En pages 112-113, Parmi les "gueules cassées", le dirigeant communiste consacre quelques lignes pour évoquer son frère non sans émotion.
