= Austria national under-18 rugby union team =

Austria under-18
- Union: Austrian Rugby Federation

The Austria national under-18 rugby union team is the under-18 side of the Austria national rugby union team in the sport of rugby union.

== History ==
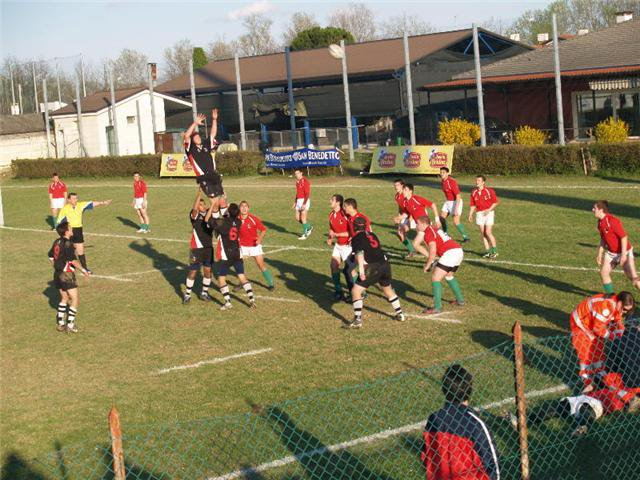
Austria - Bulgaria Lineout

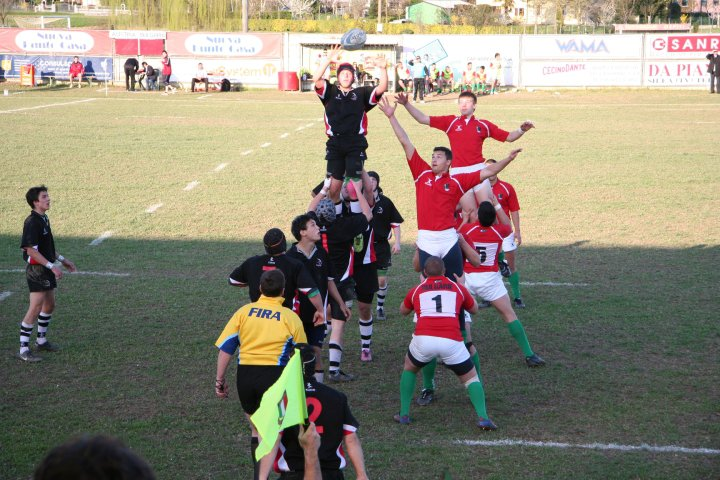
Austria - Bulgaria game

Under-18 became a recognised age-grade in European rugby in 2004.

=== European Championship ===
Austria is a minor European rugby nation, its team having taken part in the D and C divisions of the European Under-18 Rugby Union Championship. In 2006, the team won the D division and earned promotion to the C division. It had only moderate success at this level, coming last on two occasions, in 2009 and 2011.

== Honours ==
- European Under-18 Rugby Union Championship
  - D- Division champions: 2006

== European championship ==
=== Positions ===
The team's final positions in the European championship:

Year	Division	Tier	Place
2004			
2005	D Division	IV	6th
2006	D Division	IV	1st - Promoted
2007	C Division	III	7th
2008	C Division	III	6th
2009	C Division	III	8th
2010	C Division	III	7th
2011	Third Division	IV	8th
