= Maitron =

Maitron is a French surname. Notable people with the surname include:

- Jean Maitron (1910–1987), French historian
- Julien Maitron (1881–1972), French road bicycle racer

== See also ==
- Le Maitron - historical dictionary
- Matron
