= Rugby Europe Under-18 Championship =

Annual rugby union championship

- Sport: Rugby union
- Instituted: 2004
- Number of teams: 8 (2026)
- Country: Europe (Rugby Europe)
- Holders: Spain (2026)
- Most titles: France (8 titles)

The Rugby Europe Under-18 Championship is an annual rugby union championship for Under-18 national teams, held since 2004. The championship is organised by rugby's European governing body, Rugby Europe.

It has been held alternatingly in France and Italy, except for 2012 when it was held in Spain. The past editions were won by France, who won the championship in 2004, 2007, 2008, 2009 and 2010, and England, which won it in 2005, 2006 and 2012. Ireland became the third nation to win the tournament when they beat England in the 2011 final.

== History ==
The European Under-18 Rugby Union Championship was first held in 2004, in Treviso, Italy. It replaced the previously held European Under-18 Emergent Nations Championship, which had first been held in 2000. The first championship in 2004 was won by France.

The following two championships, held in Lille, France, in 2005 and again in Treviso in 2006, were won by England. Alternating between France and Italy, the next four championships were held in Biarritz, Treviso again, Toulon and once more in Treviso in 2010. All four were won by France. Wales and Scotland did not compete in those years, and England did not compete in 2010.

The 2011 edition of the competition saw the introduction of an elite division, above division one, the former A, made up of four teams, France, England, Wales and Ireland. The divisions below remained unchanged. It marked the first time that all countries participating in the six nations send a team to the European championship. The 2011 tournament was held in the regions of Armagnac and Bigorre, in southern France. It was won by Ireland and saw the French team not reaching the final for the first time.

England, Ireland, Wales, Scotland and Italy left the tournament for the 2016 edition.

On March 12, 2020, following the recent evolution of COVID-19, Rugby Europe has announced a suspension of all its matches and tournaments, from Friday, March 13, 2020 until April 15, 2020. On March 26 Rugby Europe has decided to extend the suspension of all its matches and tournaments for an indefinite period of time. On April 8 Rugby Europe Board of Directors decided to cancel 2019 European Under-18 Rugby Union Championship.

== Format ==
In 2010, the championship, similar to previous editions, was organised in an A, B and C Division, with A being the highest and C the lowest. Each division consisted of eight teams and each team played three competition games, with a quarter final, semi final and final/placing game. The D division, unlike in the past, was held in a separate tournament in 2010.

The quarter finals were played according to a seeding list, with the winners moving on to the first to fourth place semi finals while the losers would enter the fifth to eighth place semi finals.

The winners of the semi-finals one to four would play in the division final while the losers would play for third place. Similarly, the winners of the fifth to eighth semi finals would play for fifth place while the losers would play for seventh.

The winner of the A division was crowned European champions while the eighth placed team would be relegated to the B division. Similarly, the winner of B and C division would move up a division for 2011 while the last placed teams would be relegated. This meant, France was crowned European champions while Romania finished on the relegation spot. Portugal won the B division and earned promotion while Ukraine was relegated and replaced by Sweden, the C champions.

The 2011 format saw the introduction of a four-team elite division. Below this level, the divisions remained unchanged but were now numbered instead of being ordered by letters.

In 2012 the modus was changed once more. The elite division now consisted of eight teams, as did the A and B divisions, with all three played at the same time and location while the C division consisted of four and the D division of three teams and were played separately.

== Championship finals ==
=== Emergent nations championship ===
Year	Host	Final			Third place match		
Year	Host	Winner	Score	Runner-up	3rd place	Score	4th place
2000	Sofia	Belgium	56 – 17	Croatia	Andorra	28 – 10	Bulgaria
2001	Split	Netherlands	37 – 6	Moldova	Croatia	79 – 0	Hungary
2002	Prague	Belgium	5 – 0	Czech Republic	Moldova	25 – 0	Latvia
2003	Amsterdam	Poland	24 – 5	Netherlands	Croatia	29 – 7	Bulgaria

=== European championship ===
#	Year	Host	Final			Third place match		
#	Year	Host	Winner	Score	Runner-up	3rd place	Score	4th place
1	2004	Treviso	France	32–0	England	Italy	19–6	Scotland
2	2005	Lille	England	16–9	France	Scotland	10–6	Italy
3	2006	Treviso	England	15–7	France	Italy	29–3	Scotland
4	2007	Dax	France	8–8 (Pen. 4 – 3)	Ireland	England	52–9	Italy
5	2008	Treviso	France	12–5	Ireland	England	21–5	Italy
6	2009	Toulon	France	20–19	England	Ireland	51–10	Romania
7	2010	Treviso	France	27–3	Ireland	Georgia	18–15	Belgium
8	2011	Tarbes	Ireland	17–8	England	Wales	15–6	France
9	2012	Madrid	England	25–13	Ireland	France	10–7	Wales
10	2013	Grenoble	England	27–22	France	Ireland	40–0	Scotland
11	2014	Poznań	England	30–14	Ireland	Wales	31–30	France
12	2015	Toulouse	France	57–0	Georgia	England	39–12	Italy
13	2016	Lisbon	France	42–0	Georgia	Portugal	15–10	Belgium
14	2017	Quimperlé	France	36–18	Georgia	Japan	22–16	Portugal
15	2018	Poznań	Georgia	8–3	France	Spain	17–0	Portugal
16	2019	Kaliningrad	Georgia	20–10	Spain	Portugal	38–27	Russia
—	2020	Kaliningrad	Tournament canceled 2020–2022 due to impacts of the COVID-19 pandemic					
17	2021	Kaliningrad	Georgia	27–0	Portugal	Spain	46–7	Belgium
18	2022	Tbilisi / Rustavi	Georgia	34–10	Portugal	Spain	40–6	Belgium
19	2023	Prague	Georgia	19–3	Portugal	Spain	26–13	Netherlands
20	2024	Prague	Georgia	32–11	Spain	Netherlands	34–0	Czech Republic
21	2025	Prague	Spain	16–11	Georgia	Netherlands	26–15	Czech Republic
22	2026	Prague	Spain	23–17	Georgia	Czech Republic	45–24	Netherlands

== Medals (2003-2026) ==
Rank	Nation	Gold	Silver	Bronze	Total
1	France	8	4	1	13
2	Georgia	6	5	1	12
3	England	5	3	3	11
4	Spain	2	2	4	8
5	Ireland	1	5	2	8
6	Portugal	0	3	2	5
7	Italy	0	0	2	2
7	Netherlands	0	0	2	2
7	Wales	0	0	2	2
10	Czech Republic	0	0	1	1
10	Japan	0	0	1	1
10	Scotland	0	0	1	1
Totals (12 entries)		22	22	22	66

== Divisional champions ==
Emergent nations championship 2000 to 2003:

Year	A
2000	Belgium
2001	Netherlands
2002	Belgium
2003	Poland

The divisional champions from 2004 to 2010:

Year	A	B	C	D
2004	France	Spain	Croatia	Not held
2005	England	Portugal	Latvia	Hungary
2006	England	Romania	Netherlands	Austria
2007	France	Spain	Lithuania	Bulgaria
2008	France	Belgium	Switzerland	Serbia
2009	France	Germany	Czech Republic	Luxembourg
2010	France	Portugal	Sweden	Moldova

The divisional champions after the reorganisation in 2011:

Year	Elite	A	B	C	D
2011	Ireland	Scotland	Spain	Serbia	Croatia
2012	England	Belgium	Poland	Croatia	Austria
2013	England	Spain	Netherlands	Austria	Denmark
2014	England	Russia	Sweden	Latvia	Moldova
2015	France	Russia	Ukraine	Denmark	Andorra

The divisional champions after the reorganisation in 2016:

Year	Championship	Trophy	Conference 1	Conference 2
2016	France	Poland	Croatia	Israel
2017	France	Russia	Lithuania	Switzerland
2018	Georgia	Germany	Croatia	Not held
2019	Georgia	Not held		
2020	Tournament canceled 2020–2022 due to impacts of the COVID-19 pandemic			
2021	Georgia	Not held		
2022	Georgia	Not held		

The divisional champions after the reorganisation in 2023:

Year	Championship	Qualifier
2023	Georgia	Switzerland
2024	Georgia	Germany
2025	Spain	Poland
2026	Spain	Belgium

== Placings ==
The placings in the championship in order of the 2019 results:

Team	2004	2005	2006	2007	2008	2009	2010	2011	2012	2013	2014	2015	2016	2017	2018	2019	2021	2022	2023		2024		2025		2026	
Spain	1	8	2	1	8	3	2	1	3	1	2	5	5	4	3	2	3	3	3		2		1		1	
Georgia	6	5	6	6	6	7	3	3	6	6	7	2	2	2	1	1	1	1	1		1		2		2	
Czech Republic	7	6	7	7	8	1	5	4	7	6	8	3	3	5	3	7		8	7		4		4		3	
Netherlands	6	7	1	4	6	5	3	7	2	1	7	7	2	2	8	7	6	5	4		3		3		4	
Portugal	8	1	8	8	4	2	1	5	8	8	8	6	3	3	4	3	2	2	2		5		6		5	
Belgium	3	2	3	5	1	5	4	6	1	7	6	2	4	5	7	5	4	4	6		7		8		1	6
Poland	5	3	5	3	2	4	4	5	1	3	4	6	1	6	2				2		3		1	7	7	
Germany	2	4	4	2	3	1	6	4	2	4	5	3	6	4	1	6		6			1	6	5		8	
Romania	7	7	1	5	5	4	8	7	4	5	3	4	8	3	6	8	7	8	5		8		2		2	
Switzerland	2	5	2	2	1	8	6	8	4	7	2	4	7	1	5				1	8	2		3		3	
Russia	5	6	7	7	7	6	7	8	5	2	1	1	7	1	5	4	5									
France	1	2	2	1	1	1	1	4	3	2	4	1	1	1	2											
Lithuania	8	3	3	1	7	7	7	3	8	5	6	2	6	1	4											
Ukraine	4	5	6	6	5	6	8	6	3	3	4	1	4	8	6											
Luxembourg		5	4	4	2	1	5	3	5	4	3	5	5	7	7											
Latvia	3	1	8	8	5	7	4	4	7	8	1	6	8	2	8											
Croatia	1	8	5	8	6	2	2	1	1	2	7	7	1	4	1											
Israel	7	4	8	6	8	4	3	3	3			5	1	5	2											
Hungary	8	1	6	4	2	3	2	2	8	3	2	2	5	3	3											
Moldova		2		3	5	5	1	5	3	4	2	3	6	7	4											
Slovakia													4	6	5											
Bulgaria	6	7	3	1	4	4	8	7	2	2	4	3	3	8	6											
Denmark	4	6	4	5	7	5	6	6	4	1	3	1	2	3												
Andorra										2	1	1	4	4												
Serbia		8	2	2	1	6	3	1	6	6	5	8	3	2												
Bosnia and Herzegovina		7		6	4	6		2	2	3	3	2	2													
Malta												4	5													
Slovenia		3	5		3								6													
England	2	1	1	3	3	2		2	1	1	1	3														
Italy	3	4	3	4	4	8	5	2	7	7	6	4														
Wales								3	4	5	3	5														
Ireland			5	2	2	3	2	1	2	3	2	7														
Scotland	4	3	4					1	5	4	5	8														
Sweden	5	2	7	3	3	2	1	2	6	8	1	8														
Austria		6	1	7	6	8	7	8	1	1	8															
Norway		4	6	5			4																			
Armenia						3																				
(France) Côte d'Azur Selection						7																				
Monaco						8																				

Elite Division/Championship	A Division/Trophy/Qualifier	B Division/Conference 1	C Division/Conference 2	D Division

== See also ==
- Rugby Europe U20 Championship
