= 2021 Rugby Europe Under-18 Championship =

Event held in Europe

Tournament details
- Host nation: Russia
- Dates: 3 October 2021 – 10 October 2021
- No. of nations: 8

Final positions
- Champions: Georgia
- Runner-up: Portugal

Tournament statistics
- Matches played: 12

The 2021 Rugby Europe Under-18 Championship was held in Kaliningrad, Russia from 3 to 9 October 2021. Georgia won the championship after defeating Portugal 27–0.

== Teams ==
- Belgium
- Czech Republic
- Netherlands
- Georgia
- Portugal
- Romania
- Russia
- Spain

== Results ==
=== Round 1 ===
==== Quarter-finals ====
October 3
11:24 PM
13:24:00 (Local)

| Spain | 45 – 8 | Romania |
| | Report |

RZD Arena, Kaliningrad
Referee: (France) Rousselet Benoit

October 4
01:00 AM
15:00:00 (Local)

| Russia | 10 – 21 | Belgium |
| | Report |

Selma Stadium, Kaliningrad
Referee: (Italy) Dario Merli

October 4
01:55 AM
15:55:00 (Local)

| Portugal | 26 – 15 | Netherlands |
| | Report |

RZD Arena, Kaliningrad
Referee: (Switzerland) Ethan Glass

October 4
04:26 AM
18:26:00 (Local)

| Georgia | 76 – 0 | Czech Republic |
| | Report |

Selma Stadium, Kaliningrad
Referee: (Russia) Kirill ZAKHAROV

=== Round 2 ===
==== 5th-7th Place Semi-finals ====
October 6
10:55 PM
12:55:00 (Local)

| Romania | 0 - 34 | Netherlands |
| | Report |

RZD Arena, Kaliningrad
Referee: (Italy) Dario Merli

October 7
12:55 AM
14:55:00 (Local)

| Russia | 50 – 0 | Czech Republic |

Selma Stadium, Kaliningrad

==== Cup Semi-finals ====
October 7
03:00 AM
17:00:00 (Local)

| Spain | 12 - 31 | Portugal |
| | Report |

RZD Arena, Kaliningrad
Referee: (Switzerland) Ethan Glass

October 7
05:00 AM
19:00:00 (Local)

| Georgia | 37 – 3 | Belgium |
| | Report |

Selma Stadium, Kaliningrad

=== Round 3 ===
==== 7th Place ====
October 9
09:00 PM
11:00:00 (Local)

| Romania | 38 – 8 | Czech Republic |
| | Report |

Selma Stadium, Kaliningrad
Referee: (Russia) Krill Zakrov

==== 3rd Place ====
October 10
12:25 AM
14:25:00 (Local)

| Spain | 46 – 7 | Belgium |
| | Report |

Selma Stadium, Kaliningrad

==== 5th Place ====
October 10
02:24 AM
16:24:00 (Local)

| Netherlands | 7 – 13 | Russia |
| | Report |

Kaliningrad Stadium, Kaliningrad
Referee: (Switzerland) Ethan Glass

==== Cup Final ====
October 10
05:00 AM
19:00:00 (Local)

| Portugal | 0 – 27 | Georgia |
| | Report |

Kaliningrad Stadium, Kaliningrad

== Brackets ==
Quarter-finals
Spain | 45
Romania | 8
Portugal | 26
Netherlands | 15
Russia | 10
Belgium | 21
Georgia | 76
Czech Republic | 0

Semi-finals
Spain | 12
Portugal | 31
Belgium | 3
Georgia | 37

Cup Final
Portugal | 0
Georgia | 27
3rd Place
Spain | 46
Belgium | 7

Semi-finals
Netherlands | 34
Romania | 0
Russia | 50
Czech Republic | 0

5th Place
Netherlands | 7
Russia | 13
7th Place
Romania | 38
Czech Republic | 8
