= 2009 European Under-18 Rugby Union Championship =

Tournament details
- Host nation: France
- Dates: 4 April 2009 – 11 April 2009
- No. of nations: 32

Final positions
- Champions: France
- Runner-up: England

Tournament statistics
- Matches played: 48

The 2009 European Under-18 Rugby Union Championship was the sixth annual international rugby union competition for Under 18 national rugby union teams in Europe. The event was organised by rugby's European governing body, the FIRA – Association of European Rugby (FIRA-AER). The competition was contested by 32 men's junior national teams and was held in early April 2009. It was hosted by the French region of Var - Côte d'Azur, with the final held in Toulon.

The tournament was won by France, who won its fourth European championship and its third in a row, with England finishing runners-up. The tournament marked forty years of international age grade rugby on the European continent, 1969 having been the year when the first European Under 19 competition was held.

It was sponsored by French company Justin Bridou and therefore officially called the 2009 Justin Bridou European Under-18 Rugby Union Championship.

== Overview ==
=== History ===
The European Under-18 Rugby Union Championship was first held in 2004, in Treviso, Italy. It replaced the previously held European Under-18 Emergent Nations Championship, which had first been held in 2000. The first championship in 2004 was won by France.

The following two championships, held in Lille, France, in 2005 and again in Treviso in 2006, were won by England. Alternating between France and Italy, the next three championships were held in Biarritz, Treviso again, and Toulon in 2009. All three were taken out by France, but of Europes top rugby playing nations, Wales and Scotland did not take part in the latest editions.

=== Format ===
The championship, similar to previous editions, was organised in an A, B, C and D Division, with A being the highest and D the lowest. Each division consisted of eight teams and each team played three competition games, with a quarter final, semi final and final/placing game.

The quarter finals were played according to a seeding list, with the winners moving on to the first to fourth place semi finals while the losers would enter the fifth to eighth place semi finals.

The winners of the semi-finals one to four would play in the division final while the losers would play for third place. Similarly, the winners of the fifth to eighth semi finals would play for fifth place while the losers would play for seventh.

The winner of the A division was crowned European champions while the eighth placed team would originally be relegated to the B division. Similarly, the winner of B, C and D division would move up a division for 2010 while the last placed teams would nominally be relegated. This meant, France was crowned European champions while Italy finished on the relegation spot, but was reprieved of relegation by England choosing not to participate in the 2010 tournament. Germany won the B division, Czech Republic the C division and Luxembourg the D. The last placed teams, for the same reason as Italy, were all spared relegation, too.

With a Côte d'Azur Selection, a non-national team took part to provide even numbers in all four divisions. With Armenia and Monaco, two teams took part that hadn't taken part in previous editions and would not do so again in 2010, while Bosnia and Herzegovina, which had played the previous two tournaments, did also not take part in 2010.

The teams of England, Italy and Ireland at the tournament were B selections, as these nations had committed themselves to an Under-18 Festival in Parma, Italy, where Wales and Scotland also took part. The French team however opted to take part in the European Championship instead.

=== Venues ===
The games of the 2009 championship were played at the following locations:

- Toulon
- Hyères
- Draguignan
- Saint-Raphaël
- La Londe-les-Maures
- La Valette-du-Var
- La Seyne-sur-Mer
- Six-Fours-les-Plages

== Teams and final standings ==
The participating teams and their final standings were:

Pos	A Division
1	France
2	England
3	Ireland
4	Romania
5	Belgium
6	Russia
7	Georgia
8	Italy

Pos	B Division
1	Germany
2	Portugal
3	Spain
4	Poland
5	Netherlands
6	Ukraine
7	Lithuania
8	Switzerland

Pos	C Division
1	Czech Republic
2	Sweden
3	Hungary
4	Bulgaria
5	Denmark
6	Serbia
7	Latvia
8	Austria

Pos	D Division
1	Luxembourg
2	Croatia
3	Armenia
4	Israel
5	Moldova
6	Bosnia and Herzegovina
7	(France) Côte d'Azur Selection
8	Monaco

== Games ==
The results of the games:

=== A Division ===
==== Championship ====
Quarter-finals
France	59
Belgium	5
Italy	13
Romania	27
Ireland	32
Russia	5
England	60
Georgia	3

Semi-finals
France	78
Romania	3
Ireland	0
England	7

Final
France	20
England	19

3rd Place Final
1	Ireland	51
2	Romania	10

==== Relegation ====
Semi-finals
1	Belgium	28
4	Italy	9
3	Russia	18
2	Georgia	17

5th Place Final
Belgium	18
Russia	7

7th Place Final
1	Georgia	18
2	Italy	3

=== B Division ===
==== Championship ====
Quarter-finals
Spain	69
Switzerland	12
Portugal	39
Ukraine	0
Poland	20
Lithuania	13
Germany	31
Netherlands	0

Semi-finals
Spain	14
Portugal	15
Poland	0
Germany	27

Final
Portugal	3
Germany	11

3rd Place Final
1	Spain	43
2	Poland	10

==== Relegation ====
Semi-finals
1	Switzerland	6
4	Ukraine	15
3	Lithuania	8
2	Netherlands	31

5th Place Final
Ukraine	3
Netherlands	54

7th Place Final
1	Lithuania	66
2	Switzerland	0

=== C Division ===
==== Championship ====
Quarter-finals
Czech Republic	83
Serbia	0
Bulgaria	15
Latvia	13
Hungary	21
Denmark	12
Sweden	42
Austria	0

Semi-finals
Czech Republic	91
Bulgaria	0
Hungary	17
Sweden	17

Final
Czech Republic	27
Sweden	21

3rd Place Final
1	Hungary	15
2	Bulgaria	0

- The Hungary Sweden semi final was decided on number of tries scored, which Sweden won 3-2.

==== Relegation ====
Semi-finals
1	Serbia	31
4	Latvia	3
3	Denmark	24
2	Austria	10

5th Place Final
Serbia	24
Denmark	33

7th Place Final
1	Latvia	12
2	Austria	8

=== D Division ===
==== Championship ====
Quarter-finals
Israel	10
Monaco	29
Moldova	22
Croatia	24
Luxembourg	15
(France) Côte d'Azur Selection	52
Bosnia and Herzegovina	5
Armenia	13

Semi-finals
Israel	6
Croatia	33
Luxembourg	20
Armenia	5

Final
Croatia	19
Luxembourg	24

3rd Place Final
1	Israel	10
2	Armenia	25

==== Relegation ====
Semi-finals
1	Monaco	13
4	Moldova	30
3	(France) Côte d'Azur Selection	34
2	Bosnia and Herzegovina	10

5th Place Final
Moldova	45
Bosnia and Herzegovina	14

7th Place Final
1	Monaco	3
2	(France) Côte d'Azur Selection	29

- Quarter-final awarded to Israel after problems linked to Monacos players eligibility.
- Quarter and semi final awarded to opposition after problems linked to Côte d'Azur Selection players eligibility.
