= Westport RFC (Ireland) =

Irish rugby union club, based in Westport, Co.Mayo

(Republic of Ireland) Westport RFC
- Full name: Westport Rugby Football Club
- Union: (Ireland) IRFU
- Branch: Connacht
- Nickname: The Bulls
- Founded: 1925; 101 years ago
- Location: Westport
- Region: County Mayo
- Ground: Carrowholly (Capacity: 500)
- League: Connacht J1B
Team kit

Westport RFC is an Irish Rugby Football Union team based in the west of Ireland.

The Westport RFC is affiliated to both the Connacht Rugby Football Union (its provincial parent union) and the Ireland Rugby Union.

The men's first team play in the Connacht Junior 1A League. The side also plays in the Heineken Junior Cup.

== History ==
Westport R.F.C. was founded in 1925. The original location of its single pitch was in the Demesne Westport and located at the "Bog Field Gate" on the Golf Course road.

In 1984 the club purchased land in Carrowholly, three miles from Westport town and developed two new pitches and a training area. This was followed by the opening of its purpose-built clubhouse in 1986. In 2003 the club finished a major 100,000 euro pitch improvement, which allows the teams to play and train in adverse weather conditions. This was officially opened on 1 March and marks the first phase of our club playing facilities development. On 1 March 2003 Westport revamped and refreshed its playing kit and reaffirmed its nickname " The Bulls " . The club caters for over 140 minis, 100 Youths at age grades Under 13, 15, 17 and Under 19, 2 Girls Teams and two adult Junior Teams. Children from the wider Westport area, Newport, Mulranny, Achill, Louisburgh and Leeaune Ballintubber use the club's facilities and are coached by the club.

== Notable players ==
Ireland

- Charlie Lydon

Connacht

- Kevin Moran
- Liam Scahill
- Jamie Dever

== Teams ==
As well as two adult junior rugby teams, Westport RFC also has a junior rugby section. The junior section normally has teams in all age grades from minis up to Under 19.
