= Louey =

- Commune
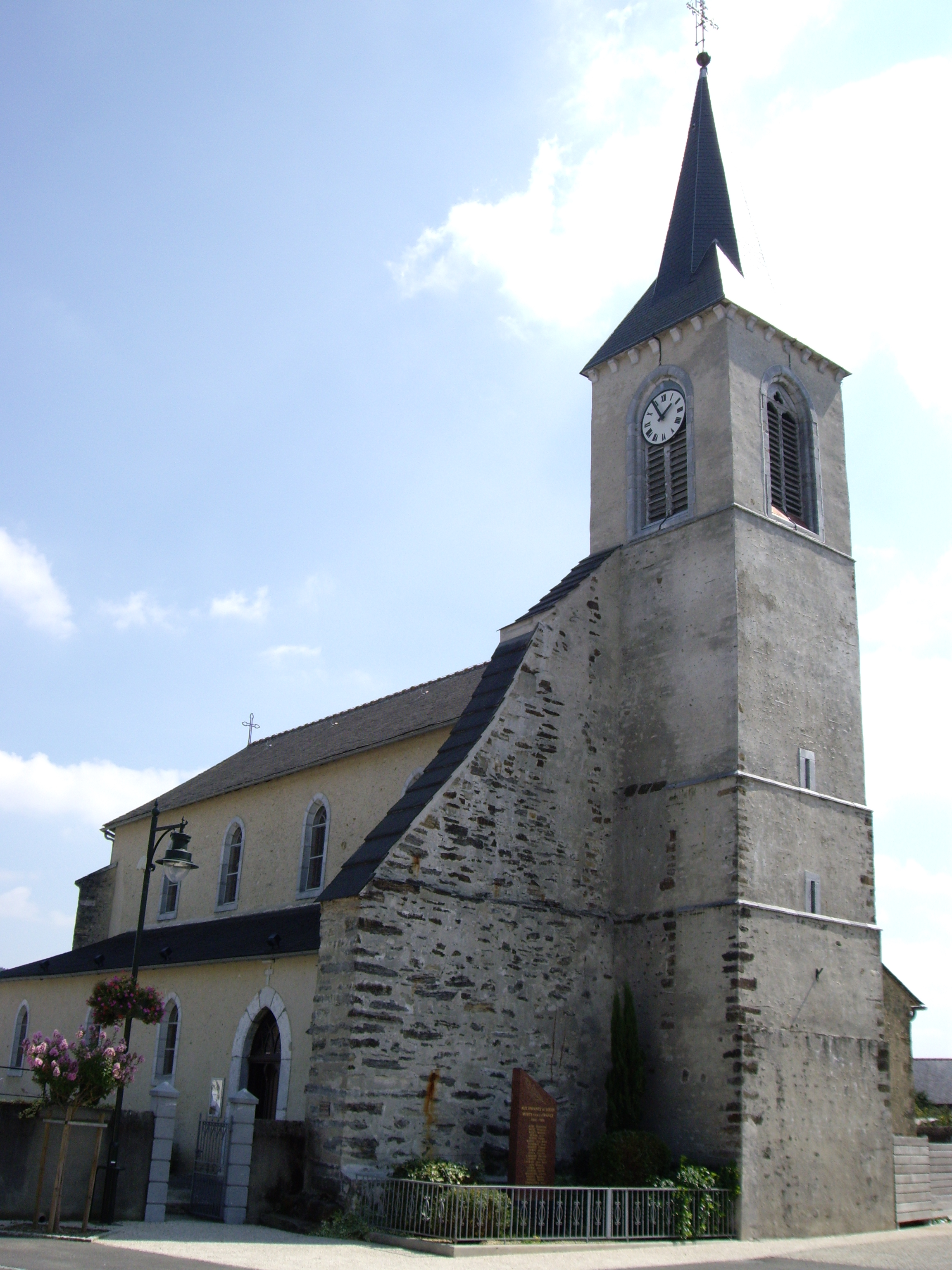
- The church of Saint-Saturnin

- Coat of arms
- Location of Louey
- Location within France Location within Occitanie
- Coordinates: 43°10′34″N 0°01′15″E
- Country: France
- Region: Occitania
- Department: Hautes-Pyrénées
- Arrondissement: Tarbes
- Canton: Ossun
- Intercommunality: CA Tarbes-Lourdes-Pyrénées

Government
  - Mayor (2020–2026): Christian Laborde
- Area^{1}: 6.06 km^{2} (2.34 sq mi)
- Elevation: 351 m (1,152 ft)
- Highest elevation: 450 m (1,480 ft)
- Lowest elevation: 327 m (1,073 ft)
- Population (2023): 1,124
  - Density: 185/km^{2} (480/sq mi)
- Time zone: UTC+01:00 (CET)
  - Summer (DST): UTC+02:00 (CEST)
- INSEE/Postal code: 65284 /65290
- ^{1} French Land Register data, which excludes lakes, ponds, glaciers > 1 km^{2} (0.386 sq mi or 247 acres) and river estuaries.

Louey (French pronunciation: [lwɛ]; Occitan: Luei) is a commune in the Hautes-Pyrénées department in south-western France.

== Notable people ==
- Jacques Duclos (1896–1975), communist politician
- Jean Duclos (1895–1957), French politician

== See also ==
- Communes of the Hautes-Pyrénées department
