= Scotland national under-18 rugby union team =

Scotland under-18
- Union: Scottish Rugby
- Coach: Grant McKelvey
- Captain: Chris Auld
Team kit	Change kit

The Scotland national under-18 rugby union team is the under-18 team of the Scotland national rugby union team in the sport of rugby union.

== History ==
Under-18 became a recognised age-grade in European rugby in 2004.

=== European Championship ===
Scotland took part in the early editions of the European Under-18 Rugby Union Championship, coming third in 2005 and fourth in 2006, on both occasions playing Italy for third place. The team, after this did not take part in the competition again until 2011. Having missed out on participating in the elite division during the qualifying, the team was grouped in the tier-two first division. It won this division convincingly through victories over Romania and Germany, meeting Italy once more in the final, where Scotland won 17–12.

== Honours ==
- European Under-18 Rugby Union Championship
  - First Division Champions: 2011

== European championship ==
=== Positions ===
The team's final positions in the European championship:

Year	Division	Tier	Place
2004			
2005	A Division	I	3rd
2006	A Division	I	4th
2007	did not participate		
2008	did not participate		
2009	did not participate		
2010	did not participate		
2011	First Division	II	1st — Champions

== See also ==
=== Men's National teams ===
==== Senior ====
- Scotland national rugby union team
- Scotland A national rugby union team
- Scotland national rugby sevens team

==== Development ====
- Emerging Scotland
- Scotland B national rugby union team
- Scotland Club XV

==== Age Grades ====
- Scotland national under-21 rugby union team
- Scotland national under-20 rugby union team
- Scotland national under-19 rugby union team
- Scotland national under-18 rugby union team
- Scotland national under-17 rugby union team
- Scotland national under-16 rugby union team

=== Women's National teams ===
==== Senior ====
- Scotland women's national rugby union team
- Scotland women's national rugby union team (sevens)
