= England national under-18 rugby union team =

England under-18
- Union: Rugby Football Union
- Emblem: Red Rose
- Coach(es): Jonathan Pendlebury; Will Parkin
| Team kit | Change kit |

The England national under-18 rugby union team is the under-18 team of England in the sport of rugby union.

== History ==
Under-18 became a recognised age-grade in European rugby in 2004. In June 2018, coach John Fletcher and Peter Walton left the backroom staff having joined the U18 set-up since 2008 from Newcastle Falcons.

=== European Championship ===
England is, apart from France and Ireland, the only other team in the European Under-18 Rugby Union Championship to have won the championship, having done so in 2005 and 2006. Additionally, the team came second in the 2009 and 2011 editions. The team did not participate in the 2010 edition.

England lost the 2011 final in wet conditions against Ireland, who took out their first title.

=== Under-19 International Series ===
Since 2012, England U18s travel to South Africa to compete in the U19 international series in August every year.

==== 2012 ====
| Date | Opposing Team | Venue | Score | Results |
|---|---|---|---|---|
| 10 August 2012 | Wales | Wellington | 28 – 25 | Win |
| 14 August 2012 | France | Outeniqua Park, George | 13 – 20 | Loss |
| 18 August 2012 | South Africa | UWC Stadium, Cape Town | 36 – 29 | Loss |

==== 2013 ====
| Date | Opposing Team | Venue | Score | Results |
|---|---|---|---|---|
| 9 August 2013 | South Africa | City Park Stadium, Cape Town | 19 – 14 | Loss |
| 13 August 2013 | Wales | Outeniqua Park, George | 17 – 15 | Win |
| 17 August 2013 | France | Boland Stadium, Wellington | 12 – 8 | Win |

==== 2014 ====
| Date | Opposing Team | Venue | Score | Results |
|---|---|---|---|---|
| 15 August 2014 | Wales | City Park Stadium, Cape Town | 24 – 21 | Win |
| 19 August 2014 | France | Outeniqua Park, George | 23 – 6 | Win |
| 23 August 2014 | South Africa | A.F. Markötter Stadium, Stellenbosch | 22 – 30 | Win |

==== 2015 ====
| Date | Opposing Team | Venue | Score | Results |
|---|---|---|---|---|
| 7 August 2015 | France | City Park Stadium, Cape Town | 15 – 7 | Win |
| 11 August 2015 | South Africa A | Outeniqua Park, George | 18 – 33 | Win |
| 15 August 2015 | South Africa | City Park Stadium, Cape Town | 23 – 16 | Loss |

==== 2016 ====
| Date | Opposing Team | Venue | Score | Results |
|---|---|---|---|---|
| 12 August 2016 | France | City Park Stadium, Cape Town | 18 – 23 | Loss |
| 16 August 2016 | South Africa A | Diocesan College, Cape Town | 53 – 14 | Loss |
| 20 August 2016 | South Africa | Paarl Boys' High School, Paarl | 13 – 12 | Loss |

==== 2017 ====
| Date | Opposing Team | Venue | Score | Results |
|---|---|---|---|---|
| 11 August 2017 | France | Paul Roos, Stellenbosch | 24 – 8 | Win |
| 14 August 2017 | Wales | Paarl Gimnasium, Paarl | 14 – 12 | Loss |
| 19 August 2017 | South Africa | City Park Stadium, Cape Town | 52 – 22 | Win |

== Honours ==
- European Under-18 Rugby Union Championship
  - Champions: 2005, 2006, 2012, 2013, 2014
  - Runners-up: 2009, 2011

== European championship ==
=== Positions ===
The team's final positions in the European championship:

| Year | Division | Tier | Place |
|---|---|---|---|
| 2004 | | | |
| 2005 | A Division | I | 1st — Champions |
| 2006 | A Division | I | 1st — Champions |
| 2007 | A Division | I | 3rd |
| 2008 | A Division | I | 3rd |
| 2009 | A Division | I | 2nd — Runners-up |
| 2010 | did not participate | | |
| 2011 | Elite Division | I | 2nd — Runners-up |
| 2012 | Elite Division | I | 1st — Champions |
| 2013 | Elite Division | I | 1st — Champions |
| 2014 | Elite Division | I | 1st — Champions |
| 2015 | Elite Division | I | 3rd |
| 2016 | did not participate | | |
| 2017 | did not participate | | |
