= Ireland national schoolboy rugby union team =

Sports team

Ireland Schoolboys
- Union: Irish Rugby Football Union
- Emblem: the Shamrock
- Coach: Andy Wood
1st kit	2nd kit

The Irish Schoolboys rugby union team is the national team for secondary school students and under-18 school players in Ireland. There is an equivalent Ireland under 18 clubs side that play international rugby.

== Role ==
The Irish Schoolboys side represents the nation against youths of other nations.

They provide a starting point for Ireland qualified players that has led to players representing the National Team, Ireland A, Development, Provincial, Students, Irish U-20 and AIL teams.

Currently in both the Republic and Northern Ireland there are 246 Schools playing rugby; Ulster (107), Leinster (75), Munster (41) and Connacht (23).

== Squad ==
Squad for match against Italy on 31 October 2026, Squad coached by Andy Wood.

No.	Name	School	Club	Province
1.	Thomas Buckley	St Munchin's College	Bruff RFC	Munster Rugby
2.	Felix Zeray	Rice College	Westport RFC	Connacht Rugby
3.	Ben Ledlie	Larne Grammar School	Larne RFC	Ulster Rugby
4.	Ciaran Dunne	St Mary's CBS Portlaoise	Portlaoise RFC	Leinster Rugby
5.	Aidan Tamming	Naas CBS	Naas RFC	Leinster Rugby
6.	Sean Smyth	Dulwich College	Harlequins	IQ Rugby
7.	Killian James	St Paul's Monasterevin	Portarlington RFC	Leinster Rugby
8.	Alex Reddin	De La Salle College Waterford	Waterpark RFC	Munster Rugby
9.	Conor Martin	Coláiste Dún an Rí	Navan RFC	Leinster Rugby
10.	Elliott Young	Haberdashers Monmouth	Whitehead RFC	IQ Rugby
11.	Tom Smyth	St Louis Community School Kiltimagh	Claremorris Colts RFC	Connacht Rugby
12.	David Walsh	St Enda's College Galway	Corinthians RFC	Connacht Rugby
13.	Alan Marnell	Newpark Comprehensive School	Seapoint RFC	Leinster Rugby
14.	Rocco Quigley	St Mary's CBS Enniscorthy	Enniscorthy RFC	Leinster Rugby
15.	Leon Regan	St Joseph's CBS Drogheda	Boyne RFC	Leinster Rugby
16.	Isaac Finn	Brighton College	England	IQ Rugby
17.	Olly Quinn	Coláiste Chill Mhantain	Wicklow RFC	Leinster Rugby
18.	Aengus Langan	Presentation College Headford	Corinthians RFC	Connacht Rugby
19.	James Fullerton	Rainey Endowed School	Rainey RFC	Ulster Rugby
20.	Brandon Nolan	Bunclody Community College	Tullow RFC	Leinster Rugby
21.	Eoghan Duncan	Marr College	Marr RFC	IQ Rugby
22.	Channing Dafel	Wilson's Hospital School	Mullingar RFC	Leinster Rugby
23.	John Finnan	Marist College Athlone	Buccaneers RFC	Connacht Rugby
24.	Michael Redmond	Bunclody Community College	Tullow RFC	Leinster Rugby

== School competitions ==
Each of the four Provinces holds a Schools Cup competition every season, usually culminating in a Provincial Cup Final held on or around St Patricks Day (17 March each year). Despite the age group the qualifying games and finals are usually very well attended with crowds often better than those attending most adult club games, for Leinster Schools Cup Finals crowds of 15–20,000 are not unusual. This has brought onboard sponsors of the various competitions such as the Northern Bank Schools' Cup (Ulster), Supermacs Schools Cup (Connacht) and the Powerade Schools' Cup (Leinster).

== Opposition ==
They also play against other 6 Nations countries' schoolboys sides during the year, and also other test playing nations schools teams on a more infrequent basis.

Recent matches include a narrow loss to France in a schoolboy Under-18 match on 20 December 2007.

Since 2011, the team has taken part in the annual European Under-18 Rugby Union Championship, winning the title in this competition in 2011. It was Ireland's fourth appearance in the final, having previously lost to France in 2007, 2008 and 2010. 2011 marked the first time that Ireland was represented by a schools team rather than a Clubs XV.

== Notable former Schoolboy representatives ==
The following players have been called up by the Ireland senior national team.

- Andrew Trimble
- David Humphreys
- Tommy Bowe
- Paddy Wallace
- Jacob Stockdale
- Rory Best
- Simon Best
- Fionn Carr
- Paddy Jackson
- Stuart Olding
- Darren Cave
- Paul Marshall
- Nathan Doak
- Neil McMillan
- Michael Lowry
- James Hume
- Jeremy Davidson
- Iain Henderson
- Gordon D'Arcy
- Luke Fitzgerald
- Cian Healy
- Jamie Heaslip
- Shane Jennings
- Rob Kearney
- Brian O'Driscoll
- Johnny Sexton
- Gavin Duffy
- Andrew Dunne
- Oli Jager

== Honours ==
- European Under-18 Rugby Union Championship
  - Champions: 2011
  - Runners-up: 2007, 2008, 2009, 2012, 2014

== European championship ==
=== Positions ===
The team's final positions in the European championship:

Year	Division	Tier	Place
2004	A Division	I	
2005	A Division	I	5th
2006	A Division	I	2nd – Runners-up
2007	A Division	I	2nd – Runners-up
2008	A Division	I	2nd – Runners-up
2009	A Division	I	3rd
2010	A Division	I	2nd – Runners-up
2011	Elite Division	I	1st – Champions
2012	Elite Division	I	2nd – Runners-up
2013	Elite Division	I	3rd
2014	Elite Division	I	2nd – Runners-up
2015	Elite Division	I	7th
