= Italy national under-18 rugby union team =

Italy under-18
- Union: Italian Rugby Federation
- Coach: (Italy) Massimo Brunello
Team kit	Change kit

The Italy national under-18 rugby union team is the under-18 team of the Italy national rugby union team in the sport of rugby union.

== History ==
Under-18 became a recognised age-grade in European rugby in 2004.

=== European Championship ===
Italy, who is the only other six nation side apart from France to have competed at every edition of the European Under-18 Rugby Union Championship, has done so with moderate success. A third place in 2006 stands as the team's best result, while a last place finish in the A division in 2009 almost meant relegation.

In a revamped competition in 2011, the elite division featured only the top four teams and Scotland and Italy failed to qualify. The two sides reached the final of the first division where Italy lost 12–17 to Scotland. The elite division was expanded to 8 teams for 2012, to include all of the six nations sides.

== Honours ==
- European Under-18 Rugby Union Championship:
  - A Division Runners-up: 2011

== European championship ==
=== Positions ===
The team's final positions in the European championship:

Year	Division	Place
2004	A Division	3rd - (bronze)
2005	A Division	4th
2006	A Division	3rd - (bronze)
2007	A Division	4th
2008	A Division	4th
2009	A Division	8th
2010	A Division	5th
2011	Elite Division	2nd - (silver)
2012	Elite Division	7th
2013	Elite Division	7th
2014	Elite Division	6th
2015	Elite Division	4th
