= Casale sul Sile =

- Comune
- Comune di Casale sul Sile
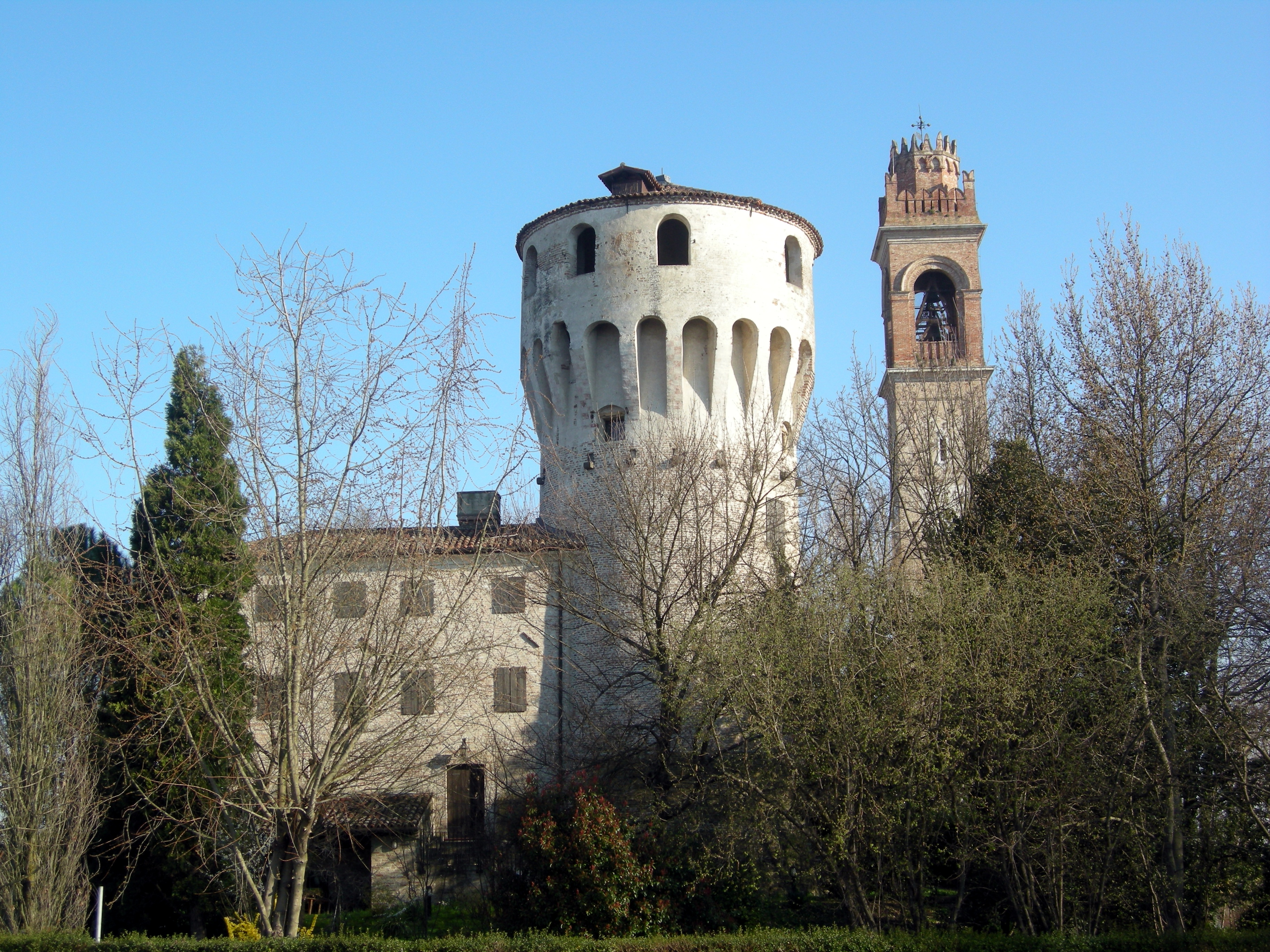

- Location within Italy Location within Veneto
- Coordinates: 45°36′N 12°20′E
- Country: Italy
- Region: Veneto
- Province: Treviso (TV)
- Frazioni: Conscio, Lughignano

Government
  - Mayor: Stefania Golisciani

Area
  - Total: 26 km^{2} (10 sq mi)

Population (31 May 2017)
  - Total: 12,998
  - Density: 500/km^{2} (1,300/sq mi)
- Demonym: Casalesi
- Time zone: UTC+1 (CET)
  - Summer (DST): UTC+2 (CEST)
- Postal code: 31032
- Dialing code: 0422
- Patron saint: Santa Maria Assunta
- Saint day: 5 April
- Website: Official website

Casale sul Sile is a comune with c. 13,000 inhabitants in the province of Treviso in the Veneto, north-eastern Italy. Its name (translated as 'farmhouse on the Sile') comes from Sile, the river that runs through it.

The town is known for its rugby team, Rugby Casale.
