= 2013–14 Belgian Elite League =

Belgian rugby competition

- Countries: Belgium
- Matches played: 59

The 2013–14 Belgian Elite League is a competition between eight Belgian rugby teams. It will start on 8 September 2013 and will end with a final championship game after the playoffs. The final will be held at the King Baudouin Stadium. ASUB Waterloo begin the season as defending champions having won the 2012/13 title.

Location of the 2013-14 Belgian Elite League teams

== Season table ==
Key to colours
Champions
Participants in Championship Playoffs
Bottom team is relegated to Division 2.

2013–14 Belgian Elite League Table
	Club	Games	Won	Drawn	Lost	Points For	Points Against	Diff	Pts
1	ASUB Waterloo	14	11	0	3	438	153	285	54
2	Boitsfort RC	14	11	1	2	467	174	293	53
3	Kituro	14	9	0	5	374	214	160	44
4	Dendermondse	14	9	1	4	366	214	152	43
5	RC Soignies	14	8	1	5	353	256	97	41
6	Liége	14	3	1	10	175	483	-308	16
7	RC Frameries	14	3	0	11	229	534	-305	15
8	Coq Mosan	14	0	0	14	135	509	-374	2

== Championship playoffs ==
Semi-Final
ASUB	20
Kituro	12
Boitsfort	15
Dendermondse	18

Final
ASUB	28
Dendermondse	15
