= BUC St Josse =

(Belgium) BUC Saint-Josse
- Full name: Brussels University Club Saint-Josse Rugby Club
- Union: Belgian Rugby Federation
- Location: Evere, Brussels, Belgium
- Ground: Stade Georges-Pètre
- League: Belgian Elite League
- 2012/13: 8th
Team kit

Official website
- www.bucrugby.be

BUC Saint Josse Rugby Club is a Belgian rugby union club currently competing in the Belgian Second Division.

The club is based in the Brussels suburb of Evere in the Brussels Capital Region. The official colours of the club are red and white.

== History ==
The club has won the Belgian Elite League title once in 1973 and the Belgian Cup once also in 1973. They were promoted from the 2nd Division in 2011 having won the league but were relegated following the 2012/13 season during which they finished bottom.

In the 2011/12 season they finished the regular season in sixth place.

== Honours ==
- Belgian Elite League
  - Champions: 1972-73
- Belgian Cup
  - Champions: 1972-73
- Belgian 2nd Division
  - Champions: 2010-11

== Season by Season ==
Season	Tier	Division	League Pos.	Play Offs	Notes
2003–04					
2004–05					
2005–06					
2006–07	2	Belgian 2nd Division	3		
2007–08	2	Belgian 2nd Division	1		
2008–09	2	Belgian 2nd Division	2		
2009–10	2	Belgian 2nd Division	2		
2010–11	2	Belgian 2nd Division	1		Promoted
2011–12	1	Belgian Elite League	6		
2012–13	1	Belgian Elite League	8		

== See also ==
- Rugby union in Belgium
- Belgian Cup (Rugby Union)
