= Belgian Super Cup (rugby union) =

The Belgian Super Cup is an annual Rugby Union match contested between the winners of the Belgian Elite League and the Belgian Cup. The match is held in September of the following season as the opener to the new season.

== History ==
The competition was founded in 2009 and has been held four times. Royal Kituro are the only team to have won it more than once. The highest scoring game to date was the 2011 final when Royal Kituro beat Boitsfort RC 23-22.

== Winners ==
Date	Elite League Champions	Score	Belgian Cup Winners	Location
2009	Kituro RC	6 - 15	ASUB Waterloo	King Baudouin Stadium, Brussels
2010	Boitsfort RC	7 - 20	RC Soignies	ADEPS Stadium, Jambes
2011	Kituro RC	23 - 22	Boitsfort RC	ADEPS Stadium, Jambes
2012	Royal Kituro RC	12 - 5	RC Frameries	Luc Varenne Stadium, Tournai
2014	ASUB Waterloo	30 - 0	Boitsfort RC	Pachy Stadium, Waterloo
