= Belgian Cup (rugby union) =

The Belgian Cup is the premier Rugby Union knock-out competition in Belgium and is organised by the Belgian Rugby Federation. The cup has been held annually since the 1967–68 season. Boitsfort RC have won the trophy more times than any other team, with thirteen victories, and also hold the record for the most successive victories, with seven between 2002 and 2008. The winners of the Belgian Cup compete with the Belgian Elite League winners for the Belgian Super Cup

== Winners ==
- 1968: ASUB Waterloo
- 1969: Kituro
- 1970: Coq Mosan
- 1971: Frameries
- 1972: Brussels British
- 1973: BUC
- 1974: Brussels British
- 1975: SHAPE
- 1976: SHAPE
- 1977: Kituro
- 1978: Coq Mosan
- 1979: ASUB Waterloo
- 1980: Coq Mosan
- 1981: Kituro
- 1982: Brussels British
- 1983: Kituro
- 1984: ASUB Waterloo
- 1985: ASUB Waterloo
- 1986: ASUB Waterloo
- 1987: ASUB Waterloo
- 1988: ASUB Waterloo
- 1989: Coq Mosan
- 1990: Boitsfort
- 1991: ASUB Waterloo
- 1992: ASUB Waterloo
- 1993: Kituro
- 1994: ASUB Waterloo
- 1995: Boitsfort
- 1996: Boitsfort
- 1997: Boitsfort
- 1998: Kituro
- 1999: Boitsfort
- 2000: Visé

Year	Winner	Runner Up	Score	Ref.
2001	ASUB Waterloo	Boitsfort Rugby Club	9–8	
2002	Boitsfort Rugby Club	Standard RC	46–0	
2003	Boitsfort Rugby Club	ASUB Waterloo	16–13	
2004	Boitsfort Rugby Club	Rugby Ottignies Club	44–17	
2005	Boitsfort Rugby Club	Brussels Barbarians	32–13	
2006	Boitsfort Rugby Club	ASUB Waterloo	11–3	
2007	Boitsfort Rugby Club	ASUB Waterloo	10–3	
2008	Boitsfort Rugby Club	ASUB Waterloo	17–13	
2009	ASUB Waterloo	Boitsfort Rugby Club	8–3	
2010	RC Soignies	Dendermonde	13–9	
2011	Boitsfort Rugby Club	RC Soignies	20–0	
2012	Dendermonde	Frameries	23–6	
2013	Boitsfort Rugby Club	Kituro	13–8	

== Wins by Club ==
Club	Wins	Years
Boitsfort RC	14	1990, 1995, 1996, 1997, 1999, 2002, 2003, 2004, 2005, 2006, 2007, 2008, 2011, 2013
ASUB Waterloo	12	1968, 1979, 1984, 1985, 1986, 1987, 1988, 1991, 1992, 1994, 2001, 2009
Kituro	6	1969, 1977, 1981, 1983, 1993, 1998
Coq Mosan	4	1970, 1978, 1980, 1989
Brussels British	3	1972, 1974, 1982
SHAPE	2	1975, 1976
Frameries	1	1971
BUC	1	1973
Visé	1	2000
Soignies	1	2010
Dendermonde	1	2012
