= Rugby Ottignies Club =

Belgian rugby union club

(Belgium) Rugby Ottignies Club
- Full name: Rugby Ottignies Club
- Union: Belgian Rugby Federation
- Founded: 1977
- Location: Louvain-la-Neuve, Belgium
- Ground(s): Avenue de Lauzelle, Louvain-la-Neuve
- League: Belgian Elite League
- 2011/12: 8 (Relegated)
Team kit

Official website
- www.rugbyottigniesclub.be

Rugby Ottignies Club is a Belgian rugby union club currently competing in Belgian 2nd Division.

The club is based in Louvain-la-Neuve in the Belgian Province of Walloon Brabant. The official colours of the club are yellow and blue.

== History ==
The club was founded in 1977 and played in the Belgian Elite League until the 2011–12 season when they were relegated to the 2nd Division for the 2012/13 season. The club have not won any major trophies but were runners up in the 2003-04 edition of the Belgian Cup. Ottiginies reached the Championship playoffs in three years running between 2004–05 and 2006-07 but lost at the semi-final stage on each occasion.

== Season by Season ==
Season	Tier	Division	League Pos.	Play Offs	Notes
2003–04	1	Belgian Elite League	5		
2004–05	1	Belgian Elite League	4	Semi-Final	
2005–06	1	Belgian Elite League	2	Semi-Final	
2006–07	1	Belgian Elite League	3	Semi-Final	
2007–08	1	Belgian Elite League	5		
2008–09	1	Belgian Elite League	6		
2009–10	1	Belgian Elite League	6		
2010–11	1	Belgian Elite League	7		
2011–12	1	Belgian Elite League	8		Relegated
2012–13	1	Belgian 2nd Division	—		

== See also ==
- Rugby union in Belgium
- Belgian Elite League
