= North Sea Cup (rugby union) =

- Sport: Rugby union
- Instituted: 2011
- President: Daniel Roelands
- Number of teams: 8
- Nations: (Belgium) Belgium (Germany) Germany; Netherlands
- Holders: TV Pforzheim
- Most titles: Heidelberger RK; SC 1880 Frankfurt TV Pforzheim (1 title)
- Website: Official site
- Related competition: Baltic Cup; Regional Rugby Championship

The North Sea Cup was an annual rugby union championship for club teams from Belgium, Germany and the Netherlands, held since 2011. The championship was sanctioned by rugby's European governing body, the FIRA – Association of European Rugby (FIRA-AER).

== History ==
=== 2011–12 ===
The first edition of the competition was held in 2011–12, with six clubs participating, two from each of the three countries. The competition consisted of Boitsfort RC and Royal Kituro Rugby Club from Belgium, SC 1880 Frankfurt and Heidelberger RK from Germany and RC Hilversum and RC The Dukes from the Netherlands. In the first edition, each team was scheduled to play four games, playing only the clubs from the other two countries but not the team from their own. However, the last round was canceled, leaving each team with only three games played. At the end, the top two teams played a final, which was contested by Heidelberg and Frankfurt, with the later winning 26–19, a surprise result given that Heidelberg had just won the German championship and been defeated only once all season, while Frankfurt had been knocked out in the semi-final of this competition.

The winners and runners-up of this competition then met the champions of the Baltic Cup and the Regional Rugby Championship, RC BaltRex Siauliai and RK Nada in the European Rugby Club Championship. In this competition, Heidelberger RK defeated Siauliai 60–10 in the final. FIRA determined that the North Sea Cup was the strongest of the three regional cups and therefore awarded entry to the semi-finals to two teams from that competition.

=== 2012–13 ===
The second edition saw the competition expanded to ten clubs in two divisions of five. In Group A the two Belgian clubs Boitsfort RC and Royal Kituro Rugby Club met German sides SC 1880 Frankfurt and SC Neuenheim. The fifth side was a selection from the south of the Netherlands, Regio Team Zuid. Group B was made up of Belgian sides Dendermondse RC and RC Frameries, German clubs Heidelberger RK and TV Pforzheim as well as a selection from the northern Netherlands, Regio Team Noord. Each team only played the other teams in each group, resulting in four games per club. The games against the team from their own country was however a regular season game in the respective Belgian and German national leagues, which was also counted towards the North Sea Cup. Initially, the group winners were then scheduled to play the runners-up of the other group in the semi-finals but fixture congestion resulted in the semi-finals being canceled and the group winners advancing directly to the final. In this game Heidelberger RK defeated Boitsfort RC 34–10.

=== 2013–14 ===
The third edition of the competition saw the defending champions Heidelberger RK decline participation while former winners Frankfurt were expelled from the cup for canceling its opening game on short notice. Eight teams were participating in the 2013–14 edition, with group A consisting of Regio Team Zuid, a team Belgium South-West, TV Pforzheim and Dendermondse RC. The B group was made up of Boitsfort RC, Royal Kituro Rugby Club, SC Neuenheim and the Regio Team Noord. The competition was once again won by a German club, this time the TV Pforzheim, who defeated Boitsford RC in the final.

== Finals ==
The finals of the competition:

Season	Date	Host	Winners	Runners-up	Result
2011–12	17 May 2012	Frankfurt	SC 1880 Frankfurt	Heidelberger RK	26–19
2012–13	18 May 2013	Amsterdam	Heidelberger RK	Boitsfort RC	34–10
2013–14	29 May 2014	Brussels	TV Pforzheim	Boitsfort RC	28–10
