= 2012–13 Belgian Elite League =

Rugby union competition

- Countries: Belgium
- Champions: ASUB Rugby Waterloo
- Runners-up: Dendermondse RC
- Relegated: BUC St Josse
- Matches played: 59

The 2012–13 Belgian Elite League was the 76th season of the Belgian Elite League, the top flight men's rugby union league in Belgium. The season saw the return of the Liegeois rugby club Coq Mosan, who were relegated to 2nd division after the 2010-2011 season. They managed to evade relegation by beating the rugby club BUC from Evere, who were relegated instead. The Championship was claimed by ASUB Rugby Waterloo who won their first Championship title since 1998.

Location of the 2012-13 Belgian Elite League teams

== Season table ==
Key to colours
Champions
Participants in Championship Playoffs
Bottom team is relegated to Division 2.

2011–12 Belgian Elite League Table
	Club	Games	Won	Drawn	Lost	Points For	Points Against	Diff	Pts
1	Boitsfort RC	14	12	1	1	527	125	402	50
2	ASUB Waterloo	14	11	1	2	346	180	166	46
3	Kituro RC	14	10	0	4	403	199	204	40
4	Dendermondse RC	14	8	0	6	336	212	124	32
5	RC Frameries	14	5	0	9	225	373	-148	20
6	RC Soignies	14	4	0	10	172	334	-162	16
7	Coq Mosan	14	3	0	11	195	484	-289	12
8	BUC St Josse	14	2	0	12	139	436	-297	8

== Championship playoffs ==
Semi-Final
1	Boitsfort	15
4	Dendermondse RC	18
2	ASUB Waterloo	20
3	Kituro	12

Final
ASUB Waterloo	28
Dendermondse RC	15
