= European Rugby Continental Shield =

Rugby union competition for European clubs

- Sport: Rugby union
- Inaugural season: 2014–15 (as Qualifying Competition); 2016–17 (as Continental Shield)
- Organisers: EPCR; Rugby Europe; FIR
- Number of teams: 10 (8 (pools) + 2 (play-off))
- Country: Italy; Georgia; Romania; Russia; Spain; Portugal; Germany; Belgium
- Holders: (Russia) Enisey-STM (2 titles) (2018–19)
- Website: European Rugby Continental Shield Website; Rugby Europe Website
- Related competitions: European Rugby Champions Cup; European Rugby Challenge Cup

The European Rugby Continental Shield (formerly the European Rugby Challenge Cup Qualifying Competition) was a rugby union competition, organised by European Professional Club Rugby, Rugby Europe and the Federazione Italiana Rugby, for entry into the European Rugby Challenge Cup.

The Qualifying Competition was first announced in April 2014, at the same time as the announcement of the creation of the European Rugby Champions Cup and Challenge Cup competitions. The tournament featured teams from non-EPCR countries, such as Spain, Germany, Belgium, Romania, Georgia, Russia and Portugal, as well as select Italian Eccellenza clubs. In 2016–17, the qualification competition also became a European Rugby competition in its own right, the third tier European Rugby Continental Shield, with both successful play-off teams meeting in a final as a part of European Rugby Finals weekend.

Both editions of the Shield final were won by Russian club Enisey-STM.

The competition is the first third-tier European tournament since the suspension of the Parker Pen Shield in 2005.

The competition was discontinued after the 2018–19 edition.

== Format ==
Under the Heads of Agreement announced on 10 April 2014, there were two places available in the European Rugby Challenge Cup through the Qualifying Competition.

For the 2014–15 season, given the time constraints in filling the competition, this was a reduced competition the form of 2 two-legged play-off matches, with the aggregate winners of each taking one of the two Rugby Europe spots in the draw, and it involved the 2 best teams from Italy's National Championship of Excellence, plus a Romanian and Georgian selection.

An expanded format was announced on 22 December 2014, the expanded format includes clubs from non-EPCR Unions Russia, Spain and Portugal alongside representatives from the Italian Eccellenza.

The 6 teams in the Qualifying Competition are split into 2 pools of 3 teams each. Each team will play the other teams in their pool once, before the two pool winners compete in a two-legged play-off against the teams currently competing in the Challenge Cup from the previous Qualifying Competition.

The winners, on aggregate, of these two play-offs will take up the Qualifying Competition places in the Challenge Cup.

In 2017, the competition was rebranded as the European Rugby Continental Shield, and it was announced that the two qualifiers would play each other as part of the EPCR's finals weekend, a practice which was discontinued for 2018–19.

== Results ==
=== Continental Shield Finals ===
Season	Country	Winners	Score	Runners-up	Country	Venue
2016–17	Russia	Enisey-STM	36–8	Krasny Yar	Russia	Murrayfield Complex, Edinburgh
2017–18	Russia	Enisey-STM	24–20	Heidelberger RK	Germany	Campos Deportivos de Fadura, Getxo, Biscay

=== Qualifying play-off results ===
Season	Play-off 1			Play-off 2			Qualify for
Season	Winners	Score	Runners-up	Winners	Score	Runners-up	Qualify for
2013–14	(Italy) Rovigo Delta	46–39	(Georgia (country)) Tbilisi Caucasians	(Romania) București Wolves	28–26	(Italy) Calvisano	2014–15 European Rugby Challenge Cup
Season	Play-off 1			Play-off 2			Qualify for
Season	Challenge Cup Side	Score	Continental Shield Side	Challenge Cup Side	Score	Continental Shield Side	Qualify for
2014–15	(Romania) CSM Baia Mare	32–63	(Russia) Enisey-STM	(Italy) Rovigo Delta	24–52	(Italy) Calvisano	2015–16 European Rugby Challenge Cup
2015–16	(Russia) Enisey-STM	70–5	(Italy) Rovigo	(Italy) Calvisano	40–64	(Romania) Timișoara Saracens	2016–17 European Rugby Challenge Cup
2016–17	(Russia) Enisey-STM	97–7	(Italy) Mogliano	(Romania) Timișoara Saracens	35–39	(Russia) Krasny Yar	2017–18 European Rugby Challenge Cup
Season	Play-off from Challenge Cup			Play-off from Continental Shield			Qualify for
Season	Challenge Side 1	Score	Challenge Side 2	C. Shield Side 1	Score	C. Shield Side 2	Qualify for
2017–18	(Russia) Enisey-STM	74–48	(Russia) Krasny Yar	(Germany) Heidelberger RK	47–41	(Romania) Timișoara Saracens	2018–19 European Rugby Challenge Cup
2018–19	(Russia) Enisey-STM	58–52	(Romania) Timișoara Saracens	(Italy) Calvisano	57–43	(Italy) Rovigo Delta	2019–20 European Rugby Challenge Cup

Key	Winners qualified to the European Rugby Challenge Cup	Winners continue in the European Rugby Challenge Cup	Winners advance to the European Rugby Challenge Cup	Runners-up advanced to the European Rugby Challenge Cup (winners ineligible)

== Tournaments ==
=== 2014 ===
The reduced format for the inaugural Qualifying Competition included two Italian Clubs, a Romanian and a Georgian side. Sides were paired up and competed in two matches, home and away. The winners, on aggregate, of these two games received one of the two places in the 2014–15 European Rugby Challenge Cup.

Pool 1	Pool 2
(Italy) Rovigo Delta	(Romania) București Wolves
(Georgia (country)) Tbilisi Caucasians	(Italy) Calvisano

==== Rugby Europe 1 play-off ====
20 September 2014
16:00 CEST

Rovigo Delta (Italy)	22–18	(Georgia (country)) Tbilisi Caucasians

Stadio Mario Battaglini
Referee: Lloyd Linton (SRU)

27 September 2014
17:00 GET

Tbilisi Caucasians (Georgia (country))	21–24	(Italy) Rovigo Delta

Vake Stadium, aka Meskhi
Referee: Matthew Carley (RFU)

- Rovigo Delta won the play-off 46 – 39 on aggregate, and qualifies as Rugby Europe 1 for the 2014–15 European Rugby Challenge Cup.

==== Rugby Europe 2 play-off ====
20 September 2014
21:00 EEST

București Wolves (Romania)	18–13	(Italy) Calvisano

Stadium Arcul de Triumf
Referee: Gary Conway (IRFU)

27 September 2014
19:30 CEST

Calvisano (Italy)	13–10	(Romania) București Wolves

Peroni Stadium
Referee: Alexandre Ruiz (FFR)

- București Wolves won the play-off 28 – 26 on aggregate, and qualified as Rugby Europe 2 for the 2014–15 European Rugby Challenge Cup.

=== 2015 ===
The expanded competition for entry into the 2015–16 European Rugby Challenge Cup features six teams, in two pools of three. Russia is represented in European competition for the first time. Matches are scheduled for the same weekends as the 2014–15 Challenge Cup, beginning with the 5th Round of the Challenge Cup.

Pool 1	Pool 2
(Italy) Calvisano	(Russia) Enisey-STM
(Italy) Viadana	(Portugal) Centro Desportivo Universitário de Lisboa
(Spain) El Salvador	(Italy) Mogliano

==== Pool 1 ====
Matches

17 January 2015

Calvisano (Italy)	34 – 3	(Italy) Viadana

24 January 2015

Viadana (Italy)	36 – 7	(Spain) El Salvador

4 April 2015

El Salvador (Spain)	12 – 62	(Italy) Calvisano

Advances to Qualifying play-offs

	P	W	D	L	PF	PA	Diff	TF	TA	TB	LB	Pts
(Italy) Calvisano	2	2	0	0	96	15	+81	13	2	2	0	10
(Italy) Viadana	2	1	0	1	39	41	–2	6	5	1	0	5
(Spain) El Salvador	2	0	0	2	19	98	–79	3	15	0	0	0

Qualifying play-off

18 April 2015

Rovigo Delta (Italy)	17 – 17	(Italy) Calvisano

2 May 2015

Calvisano (Italy)	35 – 7	(Italy) Rovigo Delta

- Calvisano won the play-off 52–24 on aggregate, and will play in the 2015–16 European Rugby Challenge Cup.

==== Pool 2 ====
Matches

17 January 2015

Mogliano (Italy)	45 – 17	(Portugal) Centro Desportivo Universitário de Lisboa

24 January 2015

Centro Desportivo Universitário de Lisboa (Portugal)	6 – 28	(Russia) Enisey-STM

4 April 2015

Enisey-STM (Russia)	19 – 15	(Italy) Mogliano

Advances to Qualifying play-offs

	P	W	D	L	PF	PA	Diff	TF	TA	TB	LB	Pts
(Russia) Enisey-STM	2	2	0	0	47	15	+32	5	2	1	0	9
(Italy) Mogliano	2	1	0	1	60	19	+41	6	4	1	1	6
(Portugal) Centro Desportivo Universitário de Lisboa	2	0	0	2	17	73	–56	3	10	0	0	0

Qualifying play-off

18 April 2015

CSM Baia Mare (Romania)	20 – 30	(Russia) Enisey-STM

2 May 2015

Enisey-STM (Russia)	33 – 12	(Romania) CSM Baia Mare

- Enisey-STM won the play-off 63–32 on aggregate, and will play in the 2015–16 European Rugby Challenge Cup.

=== 2015–16 ===
The Qualifying Competition was once again expanded, this time featuring 8 teams in two pools of four. Each team will play the teams in the other pool once. Belgium and Germany are represented in pan-European Rugby competition for the first time, through Royal Kituro and Heidelberger RK respectively.

Advances to Qualifying play-offs

Pool A	P	W	D	L	PF	PA	Diff	TB	LB	Pts
(Italy) Rovigo	4	3	0	1	136	77	59	3	0	15
(Germany) Heidelberger RK	4	3	0	1	109	71	38	2	1	15
(Italy) Fiamme Oro	4	3	0	1	74	51	23	0	0	12
(Spain) Valladolid RAC	4	2	0	2	114	68	46	1	0	9

Pool B	P	W	D	L	PF	PA	Diff	TB	LB	Pts
(Romania) Timișoara Saracens	4	4	0	0	126	48	78	3	0	19
(Portugal) GD Direito	4	1	0	3	72	82	–10	0	2	6
(Italy) Mogliano	4	0	0	4	49	105	–56	1	1	2
(Belgium) Royal Kituro	4	0	0	4	20	198	–178	0	0	0

==== Fixtures ====
Matches

14 November 2015
14:00

Royal Kituro (Belgium)	6 – 24	(Italy) Fiamme Oro
	Fiamme Oro

Complexe Wahis, Schaerbeek
Attendance: 550
Referee: Cristophe Ridley (England)

14 November 2015
15:00

(BP) Rovigo (Italy)	29 – 19	(Portugal) GD Direito
	Report

Stadio Mario Battaglini
Attendance: 800
Referee: Craig Evans (Wales)

21 November 2015
16:00

Valladolid RAC (Spain)	18 – 36	(Romania) Timișoara Saracens (BP)
	Valladolid RAC

Campos de Pepe Rojo
Referee: Elia Rizzo (Italy)

21 November 2015
15:00

(BP) GD Direito (Portugal)	21 – 24	(Germany) Heidelberger RK
	Heidelberger RK

Campo de Monsanto
Referee: Iñigo Atorrasagasti (Spain)

21 November 2015
15:00

Royal Kituro (Belgium)	P – P	(Italy) Rovigo

Complexe Wahis, Schaerbeek

- In the wake of the Paris attacks, Brussels was placed on a Level 4 Alert. In agreement with EPCR, FBRB and the municipal authorities, this game was postponed.

21 November 2015
15:00

Fiamme Oro (Italy)	19 – 0	(Italy) Mogliano
	Report

Stadio Gelsomini
Attendance: 250
Referee: Sam Grove-White (Scotland)

12 December 2015
13:30

(BP) Timișoara Saracens (Romania)	45 – 13	(Italy) Rovigo

Stadionul Dan Păltinișanu
Referee: Sean Gallagher (Ireland)

12 December 2015
15:00

Fiamme Oro (Italy)	17 – 10	(Portugal) GD Direito (BP)

Stadio Gelsomini
Referee: Iñigo Atorrasagasti (Spain)

12 December 2015
15:00

(2 BPs) Mogliano (Italy)	26 – 32	(Germany) Heidelberger RK (BP)

Stadio Maurizio Quaggia
Referee: Graeme Wells (Scotland)

12 December 2015
16:00

(BP) Valladolid RAC (Spain)	62 – 0	(Belgium) Royal Kituro
	Valladolid RAC

Campos de Pepe Rojo
Referee: Elia Rizzo (Italy)

19 December 2015
13:30

(BP) Timișoara Saracens (Romania)	35 – 14	(Italy) Fiamme Oro
	Fiamme Oro

Stadionul Dan Păltinișanu
Referee: Philippe Brousset (France)

19 December 2015
14:00

(BP) Heidelberger RK (Germany)	50 – 14	(Belgium) Royal Kituro
	Heidelberger RK

Heidelberger RK, Heidelberg
Attendance: 800
Referee: Vlad Iordăchescu (Romania)

19 December 2015
15:00

Mogliano (Italy)	10 – 22	(Spain) Valladolid RAC
	Report

Stadio Maurizio Quaggia
Attendance: 500
Referee: Craig Evans (Wales)

9 January 2016
15:00

GD Direito (Portugal)	22 – 12	(Spain) Valladolid RAC
	Valladolid RAC

Estádio Nacional, Jamor
Referee: Sam Grove-White (Scotland)

16 January 2016
14:00

(BP) Heidelberger RK (Germany)	3 – 10	(Romania) Timișoara Saracens
	Heidelberger RK; Timișoara

Heidelberger RK, Heidelberg

16 January 2016
15:00

(BP) Rovigo (Italy)	32 – 13	(Italy) Mogliano
	Mogliano

Stadio Mario Battaglini
Attendance: 1,100
Referee: Elia Rizzo (Italy)

23 January 2016
15:00

Royal Kituro (Belgium)	0 – 62	(Italy) Rovigo

Complexe Wahis, Schaerbeek

==== Qualifying play-offs ====
9 April 2016

Rovigo (Italy)	0 – 31	(Russia) Enisey-STM

Stadio Mario Battaglini

9 April 2016

Timișoara Saracens (Romania)	36 – 23	(Italy) Calvisano

Dan Paltinisanu Stadium

23 April 2016

Enisey-STM (Russia)	39 – 5	(Italy) Rovigo

Trud Stadium, Krasnodar

23 April 2016

Calvisano (Italy)	17 – 28	(Romania) Timișoara Saracens

Peroni Stadium

- On aggregate, Enisey-STM (Aggregate score: 70–5) and Timișoara Saracens (Aggregate score: 64–40) qualify for the 2016–17 European Rugby Challenge Cup.

=== 2016–17 ===
The format of the Qualifying Competition remains similar to the previous season. As before, two places in the next year's Challenge Cup will be available for teams in the Qualifying Competition.

This season's competition features clubs from the domestic leagues of non-EPCR unions Russia, Spain, Germany and Belgium, as well as four representatives from the Italian Eccellenza.

The eight participating clubs will compete in two pools with each club in Pool A playing once against each club in Pool B.

The two pool winners will then play off against Timișoara Saracens of Romania and Russia's Enisei-STM on a home and away basis to decide which two clubs will qualify for the 2017–18 Challenge Cup.

Mid-season it was announced the competition would become the European Rugby Continental Shield and the two qualifiers will play a final match as part of EPCR's 2017 Edinburgh Finals weekend.

Advances to Qualifying play-offs

Pool A	P	W	D	L	PF	PA	Diff	TB	LB	Pts
(Russia) Krasny Yar	4	4	0	0	172	61	111	4	0	20
(Italy) Petrarca	4	4	0	0	149	45	104	3	0	19
(Italy) Calvisano	4	3	0	1	134	92	42	3	0	15
(Belgium) Dendermondse RC	4	0	0	4	50	167	–117	0	0	0

Pool B	P	W	D	L	PF	PA	Diff	TB	LB	Pts
(Italy) Mogliano	4	2	0	2	129	126	7	4	0	12
(Spain) El Salvador	4	1	0	3	84	105	–21	1	1	6
(Italy) Rovigo	4	1	0	3	72	95	–23	1	1	6
(Germany) Heidelberger RK	4	1	0	3	80	181	–101	1	0	5

==== Fixtures ====
Matches

15 October 2016
16:00

Petrarca (Italy)	24 – 13	(Italy) Rovigo

Centro Sportivo Plebiscito, Padua
Referee: Craig Evans (Wales)

15 October 2016
17:00

(BP)El Salvador (Spain)	57 – 8	(Belgium) Dendermondse RC

Estadio Pepe Rojo, Valladolid
Referee: Emanuele Tomo (Italy)

15 October 2016
15:00

(BP)Calvisano (Italy)	60 – 19	(Germany) Heidelberger RK

Peroni Stadium, Brescia
Referee: Dan Jones (Wales)

16 October 2016
13:00

(BP)Krasny Yar (Russia)	48 – 24	(Italy) Mogliano(BP)

Monino Stadium, Moscow
Referee: Graeme Wells (Scotland)

22 October 2016
14:00

(BP)Krasny Yar (Russia)	32 – 5	(Spain) El Salvador

Slava Stadium, Moscow
Referee: Christophe Ridley (England)

22 October 2016
15:00

(BP)Rovigo (Italy)	19 – 22	(Italy) Calvisano

Stadio Mario Battaglini
Referee: Frank Murphy (Ireland)

22 October 2016
16:00

(BP)Petrarca (Italy)	31 – 22	(Italy) Mogliano(BP)

Centro Sportivo Memo Geremia, Padua
Referee: Sam Grove-White (Scotland)

10 December 2016
13:00

El Salvador (Spain)	3 – 39	(Italy) Petrarca(BP)

Estadio Pepe Rojo, Valladolid
Referee: Sean Gallagher (Ireland)

10 December 2016
17:00

Heidelberger RK (Germany)	21 – 50	(Russia) Krasny Yar(BP)

Sportzentrum Sud, Heidelberg
Referee: Elia Rizzo (Italy)

10 December 2016
15:30

Dendermondse RC (Belgium)	7 – 29	(Italy) Rovigo(BP)

Sportcomplex Sint-Gillis, Dendermonde
Referee: Vlad Iordăchescu (Romania)

10 December 2016
14:30

(BP)Mogliano (Italy)	35 – 26	(Italy) Calvisano(BP)

Stadio Maurizio Quaggia
Referee: Dan Jones (Wales)

17 December 2016
14:30

Rovigo (Italy)	11 – 42	(Russia) Krasny Yar(BP)

Stadio Mario Battaglini
Referee: Sam Grove-White (Scotland)

17 December 2016
14:30

(BP)Calvisano (Italy)	26 – 19	(Spain) El Salvador(BP)

Peroni Stadium, Brescia
Referee: Graeme Wells (Scotland)

17 December 2016
14:30

Heidelberger RK (Germany)	7 – 55	(Italy) Petrarca(BP)

Sportzentrum Sud, Heidelberg
Referee: Inigo Atorrasagasti (Spain)

17 December 2016
14:30

(BP)Mogliano (Italy)	48 – 17	(Belgium) Dendermondse RC

Stadio Maurizio Quaggia
Referee: Frank Murphy (Ireland)

14 January 2017
15:30

Dendermondse RC (Belgium)	16 – 33	(Germany) Heidelberger RK

Sportcomplex Sint-Gillis, Dendermonde
Referee: Christophe Ridley (England)

==== Qualifying play-offs ====
EPCR will determine about one open question: If it was like the past years, according to the rating, Krasny Yar Krasnoyarsk would meet with the Romanian Timișoara. But Krasny Yar received a letter that EPCR will hold a meeting on the final round of qualifying Challenge Cup, which will be determined the opponents. On February 14, at the office of RK "Yenisei-STM" received a letter signed by the coordinator of the qualifying competitions EPCR Vincent Prebande. Mr. Prebande reports that, like last year, the second stage of Qualifying teams will play in accordance with the principle of sport. The two-legged confrontation "Yenisei-STM" will meet the Italian club "Mogliano" and "Krasny Yar" - with the Romanian club "Timișoara Saracens".

1 April 2017

Mogliano (Italy)	0 – 46	(Russia) Enisey-STM

Stadio Maurizio Quaggia

1 April 2017

Krasny Yar (Russia)	12 – 17	(Romania) Timișoara Saracens

Rustavi Arena, Georgia

22 April 2017

Enisey-STM (Russia)	51 – 7	(Italy) Mogliano

Slava Stadium, Moscow

22 April 2017

Timișoara Saracens (Romania)	18 – 27	(Russia) Krasny Yar

Stadionul Dan Păltinișanu

- On aggregate, Enisey-STM (Aggregate score: 97–7) and Krasny Yar (Aggregate score: 39–35) qualify for the 2017–18 European Rugby Challenge Cup.

==== Continental Shield Final ====
13 May 2017

Enisey-STM (Russia)	36 – 8	(Russia) Krasny Yar

Murrayfield Complex, Edinburgh

=== 2017–18 ===
The format of the Qualifying Competition remains similar to the previous season. As before, two places in the next year's Challenge Cup will be available for teams in the Continental Shield. Clubs from six countries will compete in the 2017–18 Continental Shield.

Four representatives from the Italian Eccellenza – Pataro Rugby Calvisano, Femi-CZ Rugby Rovigo, Rugby Petrarca and Rugby Viadana – will be joined by Romania's Timișoara Saracens, RC Batumi from Georgia, Heidelberger RK of Germany and Portugal's Centro Desportivo Universitario de Lisboa (CDUL Rugby) competing in two pools of four.

Following the pool stage matches, the winners of Pool A will play the runners-up in Pool B, and the winners of Pool B will play the runners-up in Pool A on a home and away basis.

The two clubs which advance will then play each other home and away with the winners securing a place in the Continental Shield final in Bilbao next May and also qualifying for the 2018–19 Challenge Cup.

The other Continental Shield finalist will be decided by a home and away play-off between Russia's Enisei-STM and Krasny Yar who have both received a bye into the knockout stage of the competition due to their participation in this season's Challenge Cup and to their success in last season's Continental Shield.

The winners of the Enisei-STM v Krasny Yar play-offs will go through to the Continental Shield final in Bilbao and will also qualify for the 2018–19 Challenge Cup.

The aim of the Continental Shield is to widen the footprint of club rugby across Europe and to give both emerging and established clubs in different territories the opportunity to qualify for the Challenge Cup.

Advances to Pool play-offs

Pool A	P	W	D	L	PF	PA	Diff	TB	LB	Pts
(Romania) Timișoara Saracens	4	3	0	1	106	68	+38	1	1	14
(Germany) Heidelberger RK	4	3	0	1	96	74	+22	1	0	13
(Italy) Rovigo	4	2	0	2	89	86	+3	2	1	11
(Italy) Viadana	4	1	0	3	66	128	–62	1	1	6

Pool B	P	W	D	L	PF	PA	Diff	TB	LB	Pts
(Italy) Calvisano	4	2	0	2	107	52	+55	2	2	12
(Georgia (country)) Batumi	4	2	0	2	107	95	+12	2	2	12
(Italy) Petrarca	4	2	0	2	99	68	+31	1	2	11
(Portugal) CDUL	4	1	0	3	43	142	–99	0	0	4

==== Fixtures ====
Matches

14 October 2017
15:00

Timișoara Saracens (Romania)	29 – 25	(Italy) Petrarca (BP)

Dan Paltinisanu Stadium, Timișoara
Referee: Lloyd Linton (Scotland)

14 October 2017
15:00

(BP) Rovigo (Italy)	31 – 27	(Georgia (country)) Batumi (2 BP)

Stadio Comunale Mario Battaglini, Rovigo
Referee: Maxime Burlet (Belgium)

14 October 2017
15:00

Heidelberger RK (Germany)	23 – 19	(Italy) Calvisano (BP)

Sportzentrum Süd, Heidelberg
Referee: Iñigo Atorrasagasti (Spain)

14 October 2017
15:00

(BP) Viadana (Italy)	14 – 19	(Portugal) CDUL

Stadio Luigi Zaffanella, Viadana
Referee: Nika Amashukeli (Georgia (country))

21 October 2017
15:00

(BP) Calvisano (Italy)	41 – 14	(Italy) Viadana

Centro Sportivo San Michele, Calvisano
Referee: Sam Grove White (Scotland)

21 October 2017
15:00

Petrarca (Italy)	18 – 13	(Italy) Rovigo (BP)

Centro Sportivo Plebiscito, Padua
Referee: Shota Tevzadze (Georgia (country))

21 October 2017
15:00

(BP) Batumi (Georgia (country))	33 – 16	(Germany) Heidelberger RK

Rugby Arena, Batumi
Referee: Maxime Burlet (Belgium)

21 October 2017
15:00

CDUL (Portugal)	10 – 45	(Romania) Timișoara Saracens (BP)

Estadio Universitario de Lisboa, Lisbon
Referee: Andrea Piardi (Italy)

9 December 2017
15:00

Heidelberger RK (Germany)	19 – 15	(Italy) Petrarca (BP)

Sportzentrum Süd, Heidelberg
Referee: Andrea Piardi (Italy)

9 December 2017
15:00

Timișoara Saracens (Romania)	15 – 13	(Italy) Calvisano (BP)

Dan Paltinisanu Stadium, Timișoara
Referee: Nika Amashukeli (Georgia (country))

9 December 2017
15:00

(BP) Viadana (Italy)	31 – 27	(Georgia (country)) Batumi (BP)

Stadio Luigi Zaffanella, Viadana
Referee: Iñigo Atorrasagasti (Spain)

9 December 2017
15:00

(BP) Rovigo (Italy)	45 – 7	(Portugal) CDUL

Stadio Comunale Mario Battaglini, Rovigo
Referee: Ben Blain (Scotland)

16 December 2017
15:00

(BP) Calvisano (Italy)	34 – 0	(Italy) Rovigo

Centro Sportivo San Michele, Calvisano
Referee: Lloyd Linton (Scotland)

16 December 2017
15:00

CDUL (Portugal)	7 – 38	(Germany) Heidelberger RK (BP)

Estadio Universitario de Lisboa, Lisbon
Referee: Shota Tevzadze (Georgia (country))

16 December 2017
15:00

Batumi (Georgia (country))	20 – 17	(Romania) Timișoara Saracens (BP)

Rugby Arena, Batumi
Referee: Keith Allen (Scotland)

16 December 2017
15:00

(BP) Petrarca (Italy)	41 – 7	(Italy) Viadana

Impianti Sportivi Memo Geremia, Padua
Referee: Andrea Piardi (Italy)

==== Pool play-offs ====
13 January 2018
15:00

Batumi (Georgia (country))	6 – 11	(Romania) Timișoara Saracens

Rugby Arena, Batumi

13 January 2018
15:00

Heidelberger RK (Germany)	34 – 29	(Italy) Calvisano

Sportzentrum Süd, Heidelberg

20 January 2018
14:00

Timișoara Saracens (Romania)	21 – 12	(Georgia (country)) Batumi

Cluj Arena, Cluj

20 January 2018
15:00

Calvisano (Italy)	13 – 17	(Germany) Heidelberger RK

Centro Sportivo San Michele, Calvisano

- On aggregate, Timișoara Saracens (Aggregate score: 32–18) and Heidelberger RK (Aggregate score: 51–42) qualify for Qualifying play-offs.

==== Qualifying play-offs ====
31 March 2018
15:00

Enisey-STM (Russia)	47 – 22	(Russia) Krasny Yar

Trud Stadium, Krasnodar

31 March 2018
14:00

Timișoara Saracens (Romania)	26 – 20	(Germany) Heidelberger RK

Dan Paltinisanu Stadium, Timișoara

21 April 2018
15:00

Krasny Yar (Russia)	26 – 27	(Russia) Enisey-STM

Krasny Yar Stadium, Krasnoyarsk

21 April 2018
15:00

Heidelberger RK (Germany)	27 – 15	(Romania) Timișoara Saracens

Sportzentrum Süd, Heidelberg

Despite Heidelberger RK defeating Timișoara Saracens with the aggregate score of 47-41 and going into the Challenge Cup for the first time, Heidelberger RK have been disqualified from the Challenge Cup so Timișoara Saracens will replace them.

==== Continental Shield Final ====
12 May 2018
12:00

Enisey-STM (Russia)	24 – 20	(Germany) Heidelberger RK

Campos Deportivos de Fadura, Getxo, Biscay

=== 2018–19 ===
Clubs from Italy, Georgia and Belgium competed in the 2018/19 Continental Shield with a place in the Challenge Cup up for grabs.

Four sides from the Italian Eccellenza – Argos Rugby Petrarca, Pataro Calvisano, Femi-CZ Rugby Rovigo Delta and GS Fiamme Oro Rugby – were joined by Georgia's RC Locomotive Tbilisi and Belgian representatives, Belgium Rugby Barbarians XV, competing in two pools of three.

Locomotive Tbilisi, Calvisano and Fiamme Oro from Rome were drawn in Pool A while Pool B was made up of Petrarca, Belgium Rugby Barbarians XV and Rovigo. Clubs in the same pool played one another on a home and away basis and the two pool winners played off over two legs to decide which club qualified for the 2019/20 Challenge Cup.

A further place in the 2019/20 Challenge Cup was decided by a home and away play-off between Russia's Enisei-STM and Timișoara Saracens of Romania who are both competing in this season's Challenge Cup.

The aim of the Continental Shield is to widen the footprint of club rugby across Europe and to give both emerging and established clubs in different territories the opportunity to qualify for the Challenge Cup.

The Continental Shield, which was won for the second time by Enisei-STM in Bilbao in 2017–18, is organised by EPCR in conjunction with Rugby Europe and the Italian Rugby Federation (FIR).

Pool A	Pool B
(Italy) Calvisano	(Italy) Petrarca
(Italy) Fiamme Oro	(Italy) Rovigo Delta
(Georgia (country)) RC Locomotive Tbilisi	Belgium Rugby Barbarians XV

Advances to Pool play-offs

Pool A	P	W	D	L	PF	PA	Diff	TB	LB	Pts
(Italy) Calvisano	4	3	0	1	98	56	+42	2	1	15
(Georgia (country)) RC Locomotive Tbilisi	4	3	0	1	102	62	+40	2	0	14
(Italy) Fiamme Oro	4	0	0	4	62	144	-82	0	1	1

Pool B	P	W	D	L	PF	PA	Diff	TB	LB	Pts
(Italy) Rovigo Delta	4	3	1	0	218	73	+145	2	0	16
(Italy) Petrarca	4	2	1	1	121	87	+34	3	1	14
Belgium Barbarians XV	4	0	0	4	45	224	-179	0	0	0

==== Fixtures ====
Matches

Saturday 13 October
15:00

RC Locomotive Tbilisi (Georgia (country))	6 – 17	(Italy) Calvisano
	Pool A

Avchala Stadium, Tbilisi

Saturday 13 October
15:00

Rovigo Delta (Italy)	34 – 34	(Italy) Petrarca (BP)
	Pool B

Stadio Comune Mario Battaglini, Rovigo

Saturday 20 October
15:00

(BP) Calvisano (Italy)	35 – 20	(Italy) Fiamme Oro
	Pool A

Pata Stadium, Calvisano
Attendance: 1000

Saturday 20 October
13:00

Belgium Barbarians XV	12 – 31	(Italy) Petrarca (BP)
	Pool B

Stade Nelson Mandela, Brussels
Attendance: 300

Saturday 8 December
15:00

(BP) Fiamme Oro (Italy)	22 – 29	(Georgia (country)) RC Locomotive Tbilisi (BP)
	Pool A

Fiamme Oro Stadium, Italy
Attendance: 400

Saturday 8 December
15:00

(BP) Petrarca (Italy)	36 – 14	Belgium Barbarians XV
	Pool B

Argos Arena, Italy
Attendance: 500

Saturday 15 December
15:00

(BP) Calvisano (Italy)	13 – 20	(Georgia (country)) RC Locomotive Tbilisi
	Pool A

Pata Stadium, Calvisano

Saturday 15 December
15:00

(BP) Rovigo Delta (Italy)	68 – 12	Belgium Barbarians XV
	Pool B

Stadio Comune Mario Battaglini, Rovigo

Saturday 12 January 2019
15:00

(BP) RC Locomotive Tbilisi (Georgia (country))	47 – 10	(Italy) Fiamme Oro
	Pool A

Avchala Stadium, Tbilisi

Saturday 12 January 2019
18:00

Petrarca (Italy)	20 – 27	(Italy) Rovigo Delta
	Pool B

Argos Arena, Italy

Saturday 19 January 2019
18:00

Fiamme Oro (Italy)	10 – 33	(Italy) Calvisano (BP)
	Pool A

Fiamme Oro Stadium, Italy

Saturday 19 January 2019
18:00

Belgium Barbarians XV	7 – 89	(Italy) Rovigo Delta (BP)
	Pool B

Stade du Pachy, Waterloo

==== Qualifying play-offs ====
30 March 2019
14:00 (CET)

Timișoara Saracens (Romania)	20–18	(Russia) Enisey-STM

Dan Paltinisanu Stadium, Timișoara

30 March 2019
15:00 (CET)

Calvisano (Italy)	29–13	(Italy) Rovigo Delta

Pata Stadium, Calvisano

20 April 2019
10:00 (CEST)

Enisey-STM (Russia)	40–32	(Romania) Timișoara Saracens

Avangard Stadium, Krasnoyarsk

20 April 2019
15:00 (CEST)

Rovigo Delta (Italy)	30–28	(Italy) Calvisano

Stadio Mario Battaglini, Rovigo

- On aggregate, Enisey-STM (aggregate score: 58–52) and Calvisano (aggregate score: 57-43) qualify for the 2019–20 European Rugby Challenge Cup.

== See also ==
- European Rugby Challenge Cup
- Rugby Europe
