= 2007–08 Belgian Elite League =

- Countries: Belgium
- Champions: Boitsfort RC
- Runners-up: ASUB Waterloo
- Relegated: RSC Anderlecht
- Matches played: 59

The 2007–08 Belgian Elite League pitted eight Belgian rugby teams. Competition began on 23 September 2007 and ended with the final game on 17 May 2008 at the King Baudouin Stadium. The Boitsfort Rugby Club won the championship by beating ASUB Waterloo in the final of the playoffs by the score of 27-7. This is the eighth consecutive title for Boitsfort and fifteenth in its history.

Location of the 2008-09 Belgian Elite League teams

== Season table ==
Key to colours
Champions
Participants in Championship Playoffs
Bottom team is relegated to Division 2.

2008–09 Belgian Elite League Table
	Club	Games	Won	Drawn	Lost	Points For	Points Against	Diff	Pts
1	Boitsfort RC	14	12	0	2	267	118	149	38
2	ROC	14	11	0	3	338	135	203	36
3	ASUB Waterloo	14	8	1	5	226	128	98	31
4	RC Soignies	14	8	1	5	222	128	94	31
5	Dendermondse RC	14	8	0	6	249	226	23	30
6	RC Frameries	14	5	0	9	156	207	-51	24
7	Coq Mosan	14	2	0	12	93	284	-191	18
8	RSC Anderlecht	14	1	0	13	44	369	-325	15

== Championship playoffs ==
Semi-Final
1	Boitsfort RC	41
4	RC Soignies	3
2	ROC	7
3	ASUB Waterloo	15

Final
ASUB Waterloo	7
Boitsfort RC	27
