= 2011–12 Belgian Elite League =

Competitive

- Countries: Belgium
- Champions: Dendermondse RC
- Runners-up: Kituro RC
- Relegated: ROC
- Matches played: 59

The 2011–12 Belgian Elite League is a competition between eight Belgian rugby teams. It started on 17 September 2011 and ended with a final game on 12 May 2012 at the King Baudouin Stadium. The competition was won by Rugby Ottignies Club who beat the Royal Kituro Rugby Club in the final game with a score of 20–6.

Location of the 2011-12 Belgian Elite League teams

== Season table ==
Key to colours
Champions
Participants in Championship Playoffs
Bottom team is relegated to Division 2.

2011–12 Belgian Elite League Table
	Club	Games	Won	Drawn	Lost	Points For	Points Against	Diff	Pts
1	Kituro RC	14	12	0	2	306	158	148	53
2	Dendermondse RC	14	11	0	3	315	213	102	49
3	Boitsfort RC	14	10	0	4	345	173	172	47
4	RC Frameries	14	8	0	6	327	268	59	39
5	ASUB Waterloo	14	5	0	9	203	216	-13	28
6	BUC St Josse	14	5	0	9	195	333	-138	22
7	RC Soignies	14	3	0	11	171	294	-123	18
8	ROC	14	2	0	12	186	393	-207	12

== Championship playoffs ==
Semi-Final
1	Royal Kituro RC	27
4	RC Frameries	7
2	Dendermondse RC	17
3	Boitsfort	13

Final
Royal Kituro RC	6
Dendermondse RC	20
