= RFC Liégeois Rugby =

(Belgium) RFC Liègeois Rugby
- Full name: Royal Football Club Liégeois Rugby
- Union: Belgian Rugby Federation
- Founded: 1958
- Location: Liège, Liège, Belgium
- Ground: Naimette-Xhovémont
- League: Belgian Second Division
- 2012/13: 1st (promoted)
1st kit	2nd kit

Official website
- www.rugbyliege.be

RFC Liégeois is a Belgian rugby union club currently competing in the Belgian Elite League.

The club is based in Liège in Liège Province. The official colours of the club are red and blue.

== History ==
The club was founded in 1958 and has never won the Belgian Elite League, they have however reached the semi-finals of the Belgian Cup. They were promoted to the Belgian Elite League following the 2012/13 season when they finished top of Division Two.

== See also ==
- Rugby union in Belgium
- Belgian Elite League
- Belgian Cup (Rugby Union)
