= 2008–09 Belgian Elite League =

- Countries: Belgium
- Champions: Kituro RC
- Runners-up: RC Frameries
- Relegated: Dendermondse RC
- Matches played: 59

The 2008–09 Belgian Elite League was a season of the Belgian Elite League, the top flight men's rugby union league in Belgium. Kituro RC won the championship playoffs, while Dendermondse RC were relegated. In total 8 teams participated.

Location of the 2008-09 Belgian Elite League teams

== Season table ==
Key to colours
Champions
Participants in Championship Playoffs
Bottom team is relegated to Division 2.

2008–09 Belgian Elite League Table
	Club	Games	Won	Drawn	Lost	Points For	Points Against	Diff	Pts
1	ASUB Waterloo	14	11	0	3	325	123	202	36
2	Kituro RC	14	10	1	3	233	145	88	35
3	RC Soignies	14	8	2	4	241	169	72	32
4	RC Frameries	14	7	1	6	188	183	5	29
5	Boitsfort RC	14	7	1	6	257	167	90	29
6	ROC	14	6	0	8	151	188	-37	26
7	Coq Mosan	14	3	0	11	97	370	-273	20
8	Dendermondse RC	14	1	1	12	101	248	-147	16

== Championship playoffs ==
Semi-Final
1	ASUB Waterloo	18
4	RC Frameries	20
2	Royal Kituro RC	17
3	RC Soignies	12

Final
RC Frameries	11
Royal Kituro RC	12
