= North Sea Cup (disambiguation) =

North Sea Cup may refer to a number of sports competitions:

- North Sea Cup, a defunct Dutch ice hockey league.
- North Sea Cup (chess), a defunct Danish chess tournament.
- North Sea Cup (rugby union), a rugby union competition for club teams from Belgium, Germany and the Netherlands.

== See also ==
- North Sea Pro Series, a cricket competition featuring teams from the Netherlands and Scotland
