= 2010–11 Belgian Elite League =

- Countries: Belgium
- Champions: Kituro RC
- Runners-up: Boitsfort RC
- Relegated: Coq Mosan
- Matches played: 59

The 2010–11 Belgian Elite League pitted eight Belgian rugby teams. It starts on 12 September 2010 and ending with a final game on 7 May 2011 in the King Baudouin Stadium. The Royal Kituro Rugby Club won the competition by defeating the defending champion, Boitsfort Rugby Club, with a score of 13-8.

Location of the 2010–11 Belgian Elite League teams

== Season table ==
Key to colours
Champions
Participants in Championship Playoffs
Bottom team is relegated to Division 2.

2010–11 Belgian Elite League Table
	Club	Games	Won	Drawn	Lost	Points For	Points Against	Diff	Pts
1	Kituro RC	14	13	0	1	372	133	239	40
2	Dendermondse RC	14	11	0	3	361	164	297	36
3	Boitsfort RC	14	9	0	5	289	163	126	32
4	RC Soignies	14	7	1	6	306	344	-38	29
5	RC Frameries	14	6	0	8	257	212	45	26
6	ASUB Waterloo	14	6	0	8	204	272	-68	26
7	ROC	14	3	0	11	159	393	-234	20
8	Coq Mosan	14	0	1	13	107	408	-301	15

== Championship playoffs ==
Semi-Final
1	Royal Kituro RC	21
4	RC Soignies	16
2	Dendermondse RC	6
3	Boitsfort RC	16

Final
Royal Kituro RC	13
Boitsfort RC	8
