= Brussels Celtic RFC =

Brussels Barbarians Rugby Football Club Celtic
- Nickname(s): BBRFC, BC, Brussels Celtic
- Founded: 2014
- Location: Brussels, Belgium
- Ground(s): VUB Sports Complex, Ixelles
- President: (Republic of Ireland) Deirdre Furlong
- Coach(es): Men XV's Head Coach (France) Mickaël Tremege; Men XV's Assistant Coach (France) Antoine Delacotte; Men XV's Scrum Coach (France) Pierre Gros; Reserves' Men XV's Coach (England) Benjamin Baker Ladies XV's Head Coach (United States) Graham Edward; Ladies XV's Backs Coaches (Belgium) Gregory Donge (Greece) Panagiotis Spiliotis; Ladies XV's Forwards Coaches (Belgium) Igor Viaud (France) Benjamin Cohen
- League(s): Men XV: Belgian National Division 3 and Flemish Regional Division 2 Ladies XV: National Division 1 Touch: Belgian competitive division and Belgian challenge division http://bbrfcceltic.eu/ https://www.facebook.com/BBRFCCeltic/ https://www.instagram.com/bbrfc_celtic/
Team kit

BBRFC Celtic is a Belgian rugby union club in Brussels. The current club was born from the amalgamation of the Brussels Barbarians and the Brussels Celtics in 2014. The club is based at the VUB Sports Complex in Ixelles.

The club has three male XVs teams, two women's team, two touch squads and a rugby school. The club is the first international club in Belgium with players from more than 20 different nationalities.

In the 2023-2024 season, the men first XV will play in Belgian National Division 3, the men second XV will play in Belgian National Division 3 Reserves and the men third XV will play Rugby Vlaanderen Division 2.

The Ladies XV and their Reserves' team will be playing in the Belgian National Division 1.

== History ==
In the spring of 2014, preliminary talks took place between the officials of Brussels Barbarians and Brussels Celtic. The discussion centered on whether Brussels’ two foremost international rugby clubs could finally reach an agreement and form one cohesive international rugby club that would be an enticing, forward thinking, international rugby home for male, female, touch and junior rugby players of all standards in Belgium.

There had been several attempts to bring the two clubs together in the past but differences of opinion meant that talks were never conclusive. In June 2014 the members of BBRFC and BCRFC finally voted unanimously for the two clubs to merge.

== Honours ==
- Belgian League Champions: 1985
- Belgian Cup Champions: 1972,1974,1982, finalist in 2005
- Dutch/Belgian ING Plate, finalist in 2005
- Belgian National Ladies Division 2 XV Champion 2018, 2020 & 2022.
- Belgian National Division 3 Reserves Champion 2022

== Capped Players ==
The Men's, Ladies's and touch squads contain a number of players who have represented their respective countries internationally. The Belgian national teams frequently draw current and former players from their ranks.

Of note, Crispin Maenpaa is regularly selected for the Finnish National team. Craig Dowsett, who currently plays for Old Albanian RFC and the Belgian National Rugby Union team, played for the BBRFC Rugby School as a junior.
