= 2009–10 Belgian Elite League =

- Countries: Belgium
- Champions: Boitsford RC
- Runners-up: ASUB Waterloo
- Relegated: RC Visé
- Matches played: 59

Location of the 2009-10 Belgian Elite League teams

In 2009–10, the Belgian Elite League — the top tier of professional rugby union in Belgium — was won by Boitsfort Rugby Club.

== Season table ==
Key to colours
Champions
Participants in Championship Playoffs
Bottom team is relegated to Division 2.

2009–10 Belgian Elite League Table
	Club	Games	Won	Drawn	Lost	Points For	Points Against	Diff	Pts
1	ASUB Waterloo	14	13	0	1	305	139	166	40
2	Boitsfort RC	14	11	0	3	420	136	284	36
3	Kituro RC	14	8	0	6	306	190	116	30
4	RC Frameries	14	8	0	6	278	210	68	30
5	RC Soignies	14	6	0	8	257	212	45	26
6	ROC	14	4	0	10	119	367	-248	22
7	Coq Mosan	14	3	1	10	99	283	-184	21
8	RC Visé	14	2	1	11	131	378	-247	19

== Championship playoffs ==
Semi-Final
1	ASUB Waterloo	36
4	RC Frameries	23
2	Boitsfort RC	36
3	Royal Kituro RC	19

Final
ASUB Waterloo	16
Boitsfort RC	20
