= List of protected heritage sites in Frameries =

This table shows an overview of the protected heritage sites in the Walloon town Frameries. This list is part of Belgium's national heritage.

Object	Year/architect	Town/section	Address	Coordinates	Number^{?}	Image
Donjon of Sars la Bruyere and ensemble of dungeon and surrounding area ^{(nl)} ^{(fr)}		Frameries		50.370714°N 3.879658°E	53028-CLT-0003-01 Info	Donjon van Sars-la-Bruyère en ensemble van donjon en omliggend terrein
Church of Saint-Jean-Baptiste ^{(nl)} ^{(fr)}		Frameries	Sars-la-Bruyère	50.370969°N 3.878033°E	53028-CLT-0004-01 Info	Kerk Saint-Jean-Baptiste
Pavilion in Forest Colfontaine and environment ^{(nl)} ^{(fr)}		Frameries	Frameries	50.377147°N 3.847332°E	53028-CLT-0005-01 Info	
The extraction device and discharge of the well No. 11 on the site in coal mine Crachet Frameries. ^{(nl)} ^{(fr)}		Frameries		50.416826°N 3.901258°E	53028-CLT-0006-01 Info	De extractie apparaat en afvoer van de put nr. 11 op de site van steenkoolgroeve Crachet in Frameries.
Facades and roofs of buildings ^{(nl)} ^{(fr)}		Frameries	place de l'église n° 6, te Frameries	50.410570°N 3.893188°E	53028-CLT-0007-01 Info	Gevels en daken van de gebouwen
Terril n ° 12 of Noir Chain ^{(nl)} ^{(fr)}		Frameries	Frameries	50.405108°N 3.920136°E	53028-CLT-0008-01 Info	Terril n°12 van Noirchain
The walls, arches outside and inside, and the roof of the house called Fenelon or "Belle Maison" ^{(nl)} ^{(fr)}		Frameries	rue Libiez n°s 2 A et 2 B, te Pâturages	50.394941°N 3.862410°E	53028-CLT-0009-01 Info	De gevels, bogen en interieurbogen en het dak van het huis Fenelon ofwel "Belle Maison" geheten
Facades and roofs of buildings ^{(nl)} ^{(fr)}		Frameries	place de l'église n°8, te Frameries	50.410570°N 3.893188°E	53028-CLT-0010-01 Info	Gevels en daken van de gebouwen

== See also ==
- List of protected heritage sites in Hainaut (province)
- Frameries
