= Dendermonde Rugby Club =

Belgian rugby union club

(Belgium) Dendermonde RC
- Full name: Dendermonde Rugby Club
- Union: Belgian Rugby Federation
- Founded: 1962
- Location: Dendermonde, Belgium
- Ground(s): Sport Complex Sint-Gillis, Dendermonde
- League(s): Belgian Elite League
- 2018/19: Champions
Team kit

Official website
- www.dendermonderugby.com

Dendermonde RC is a Belgian rugby union club currently competing in Belgian Elite League.

The club is based in Dendermonde in the Flemish Province of East Flanders. They are currently the only team from Flanders in the top flight. The official colours of the club are green and yellow.

== History ==
The club was founded in 1962 under the name of SOS Rugby Sint-Gillis. The club's first game was against ASUB, resulting in a 13-20 loss.

Developing a strong youth following, the turn of the 1990s saw the club push on with the construction of its own complex in the Van Langenhovestraat region. and won its first Belgian League Title in 2012 having previously won the 2nd Division title twice in 1970 and 2010. Dendermonde won the Belgian double in 2011/12 breaking the domination of the Walloon and Brussels based teams. In September 2017 Dendermonde became a global partner club of Leicester Tigers.

== Honours ==
- Belgian Elite League
  - Champions: 2012, 2016, 2017, 2018, 2023, 2024,2025
- Belgian Second Division
  - Champions: 1970, 2010
- Coupe de Belgique
  - Champions: 2012, 2016

== Season by Season ==
Season	Tier	Division	League Pos.	Play Offs	Notes
2003–04	1	Belgian Elite League	2	???	
2004–05	1	Belgian Elite League	6		
2005–06	1	Belgian Elite League	4	Semi-Final	
2006–07	1	Belgian Elite League	4	Semi-Final	
2007–08	1	Belgian Elite League	5		
2008–09	1	Belgian Elite League	8		Relegated
2009–10	2	Belgian 2nd Division	1		Promoted
2010–11	1	Belgian Elite League	2	Semi-Finals	
2011–12	1	Belgian Elite League	1	Champions	Cup champions
2012–13	1	Belgian Elite League	4		
2024–25	1	Belgian Elite League	1	Champions	

== See also ==
- Rugby union in Belgium
- Belgian Elite League
