= Auguste Toubeau =

- Born: August 21, 1855; Frameries, Belgium
- Died: June 26, 1912 (aged 56)

Auguste Toubeau (21 August 1855 – 26 June 1912) was a Belgian trade unionist and socialist. He began work in a coal mine from an early age. Later, after a serious work accident, he became a prominent figure in the cooperative movement and local government.

== Early life ==
Toubeau was born into a poor family in the town of Frameries, Belgium, his parents being Jean-François Joseph Toubeau and Désirée Docquier. Like most of the poor children of that period, he started working in the mine in 1865 while only 10 years old.

== Turn to socialism and trade unionism ==
Toubeau read the early journals published by Louis Bertrand, which convinced him of the socialist cause; he built up a library of piles of these papers. He was a founder member of the Parti Ouvrier. By 1879 he had joined the Compagnons (an early trade union formation). In around 1881 this organization dissolved and for a few years, there was no trade union organization. Subsequently, though, many cooperative societies were set up in the Borinage region; the first in Frameries in 1885 was followed by others in the neighboring villages and towns the following year.

== Accident ==
Toubeau was forced to quit mining work in 1886 after a rock fall in the mine where he worked that left him seriously injured. His life was saved through intensive and costly medical attention but his left leg was amputated below the knee.

This was a time of much labour unrest in the Borinage, in which Toubeau took part as far as his disability allowed. He played an important part in an event that caused much stir at the time. After a demonstration in which mine company buildings were damaged a number of workers had been arrested on charges of conspiracy. Their case came to court in May 1889. Toubeau was a witness in the miners' defence. He was able to expose one of the demonstrators as an agent provocateur who had attempted to disguise himself by stealing Toubeau's cloth cap. The case against the miners collapsed and instead the agent provocateur was convicted of perjury.

== Responsible posts ==
In 1891, Toubeau became Comptroller General of the Cooperative of Frameries. Seated behind an old desk covered in files, he would give help and advice to the workers on such matters as writing letters and applying for pensions. On 17 November 1895 he was elected for the town council, and afterwards reelected on 18 October 1903 and 20 October 1907. When the new council was installed on 13 January 1908, Toubeau was elected as Schepen responsible for education, and he was also "Officier de l'Etat Civil" (registrar of births, marriages and deaths). As well as these functions, he also had other responsibilities like secretary and later president of the choir "L'Avenir", administrator of the Pâturages middle school, president of the Frameries miners' union and president of the benevolent fund. He also ran a café "A la Belle Vue des Monuments".

== Funeral ==
His funeral was attended by an estimated 5000 people. The funeral cortège that set out from his café was accompanied by a brass band and a choir. Wreaths were presented by the town council, co-operative society and the miners' union. Delegations came from the miners' unions and other organisations of towns and villages across the region. He was buried in a vault located on the central avenue of the town cemetery.
