= R.S.C. Anderlecht Rugby =

Coordinates: 50°49′42″N 4°16′26″E

R.S.C. Anderlecht rugby section
- Full name: Royal Sporting Club Anderlecht rugby section
- Nickname(s): "Purple and white" (Dutch: "Paars en wit"; French: Les "mauve et blanc"), The "sporting"
- Founded: 1931
- Ground: Stade Constant Deleau
- President: Alexandre Van Pestel
1st kit	2nd kit

Official website
- rscarugby.be

The R.S.C. Anderlecht rugby section is a Belgian rugby union club from the Brussels municipality of Anderlecht.

== History ==
The club was founded on 21 September 1931 by players of the Rugby Club Français shortly before the creation of the Belgian Rugby Federation. In 1935 it became the rugby section of the R.S.C. Anderlecht football team. It is the oldest rugby club in Belgium and the most successful.

== Seniors ==
The men play competitively in matches every Sunday afternoon between September and May in the Belgian National Second Division. The ladies play every Saturday in the Belgian National Second Division.

== Honours ==
- Belgian League Champions (20): 1939, 1946, 1947, 1948, 1949, 1949, 1951, 1952, 1953, 1954, 1955, 1956, 1958, 1959, 1964, 1966, 1970, 1971, 1972 & 1974
- Belgian Cup Winners (0): finalist in 1976 & 1988
