= Frameries =

Municipality in Hainaut Province, Wallonia, Belgium

Frameries Framrie (Picard)
- Municipality
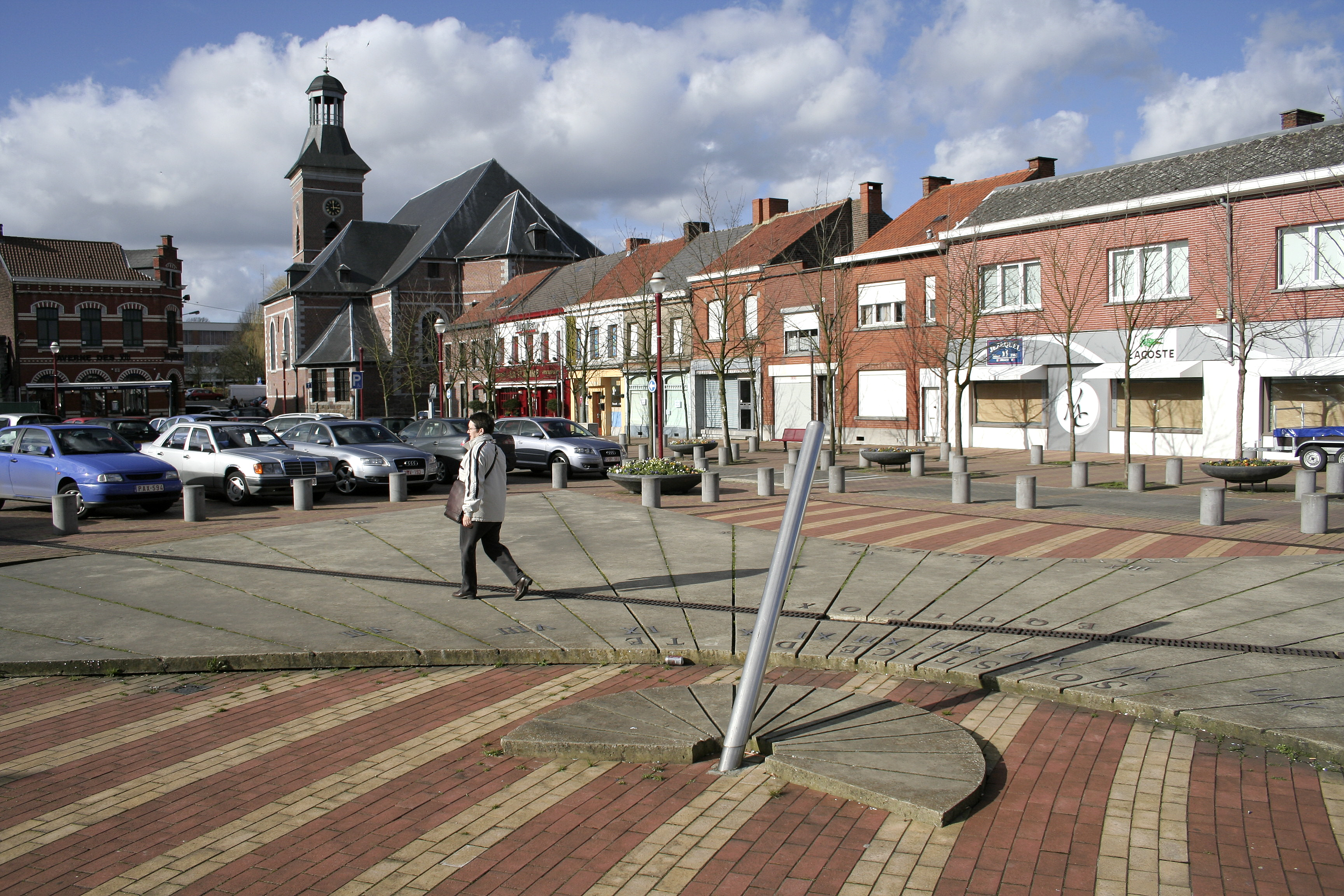
- Church Square and the big sundial

- Flag Coat of arms

- Location of Frameries in Hainaut
- Interactive map of Frameries
- Location in Belgium
- Coordinates: 50°24′N 03°54′E
- Country: Belgium
- Community: French Community
- Region: Wallonia
- Province: Hainaut
- Arrondissement: Mons

Government
  - Mayor: Jean-Marc Dupont (PS)
  - Governing party: Coalition PS-MR

Area
  - Total: 26.09 km^{2} (10.07 sq mi)

Population (2018-01-01)
  - Total: 21,878
  - Density: 838.6/km^{2} (2,172/sq mi)
- Postal codes: 7080
- NIS code: 53028
- Area codes: 065
- Website: www.frameries.be

Frameries (French pronunciation: [fʁam(ə)ʁi]; Picard: Framrie; Walloon: Framriye) is a municipality of Wallonia located in the province of Hainaut, Belgium.

The municipality consists of the following districts: Eugies, Frameries, La Bouverie, Noirchain, and Sars-la-Bruyère.

== Sport ==
Frameries is home to Rugby Union club RC Frameries who currently play in the Belgian Elite League and hosts the finish of the Grand Prix Pino Cerami cycling race.

== Personalities ==
- Eugène Boch, painter and friend of Vincent van Gogh
- Auguste Toubeau, trade unionist

== Twin towns ==
- La Chaux-de-Fonds, Switzerland
- Issy-les-Moulineaux, France
- Willmar, Minnesota, USA

== Image gallery ==
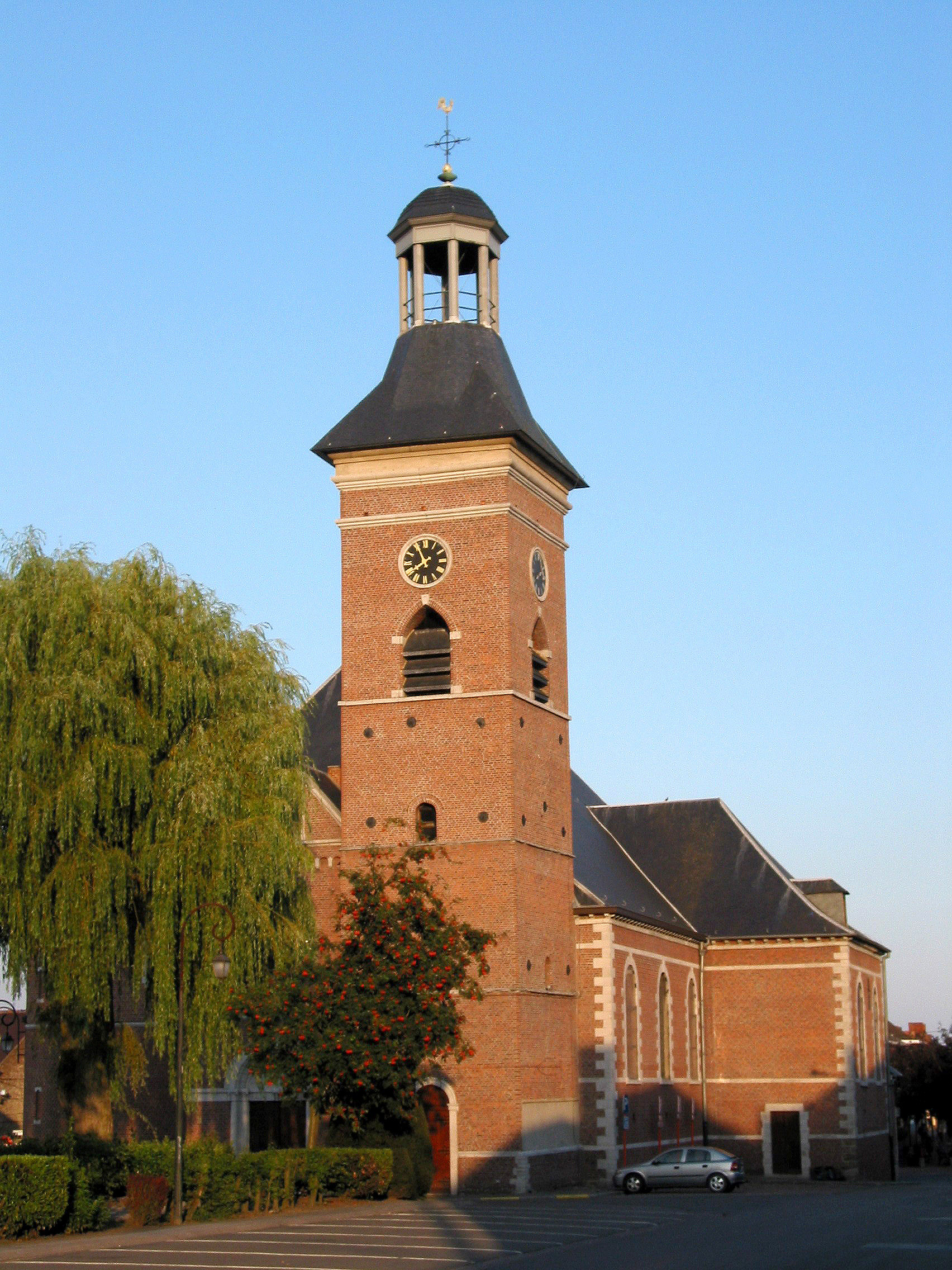
St. Waltrude's church

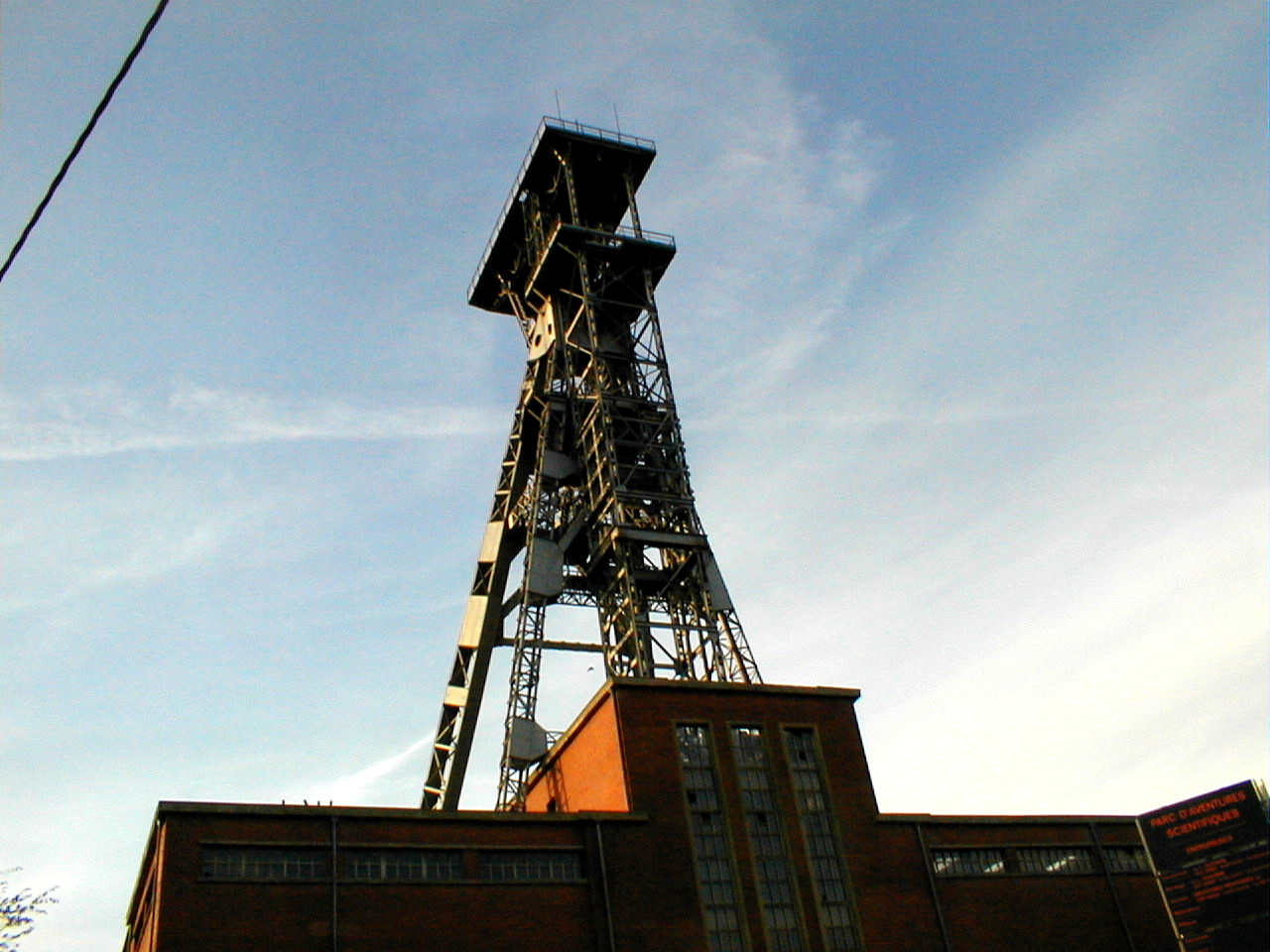
Châssis à molette (Wallonia French, also Belfleur; French chevalement), Gallow frame of the Crachet (reconstruction) in Frameries
