= Royal Kituro Rugby Club =

Belgian rugby union club, based in Brussels

Coordinates: 50°51′38″N 4°23′50″E

(Belgium) Kituro RC
- Full name: Royal Kituro Avia Schaerbeek Rugby Club
- Union: Belgian Rugby Federation
- Founded: 1961; 65 years ago
- Location: Schaerbeek, Brussels, Belgium
- Ground(s): Complexe Wahis, Schaerbeek
- President: Marcos Quenon
- Coach: Sébastien Guns
- League: Belgian Elite League
- 2025/2026: 6
Team kit

Official website
- www.kituro.be

The Royal Kituro Avia Schaerbeek Rugby Club, often shortened Kituro RC, is a Belgian rugby union club currently competing in the Belgian Elite League. On 8 February 2015, they beat RC Soignies 356-3, breaking the all-time record for the highest scoring game in Rugby union history.

The club is based in Schaerbeek, a suburb to Brussels.

The official colors of the club are green and black. The Kituro is a 50-year-old rugby club; one of the most successful in Belgium with more than 560 players from U7 to U19, Seniors, Veterans, Ladies and a Touch Team.

Members can use its two new synthetic pitches (International IRB Standards), six changing rooms, and club house.

The club is located in Brussels alongside the Boulevard Léopold III (Zaventem airport highway) between NATO and the EU Schuman area.

== History ==
The club was founded in 1961 by international referee Teddy Lacroix along with Volcanologist and Rugby Player Haroun Tazieff who choose to name the club after Mount Kituro in the former Belgian Colony of Congo. The club was donated land by the City Of Brussels and quickly established itself as a major force in Belgian Rugby. The heir to the Belgian Throne Prince Philippe, Duke of Brabant played for the team.

Kituro has won the Belgian Elite League title on five occasions and most recently in May 2015. In the same year, they also recorded the largest win in rugby history, beating Soignies Rugby Club 356-3.

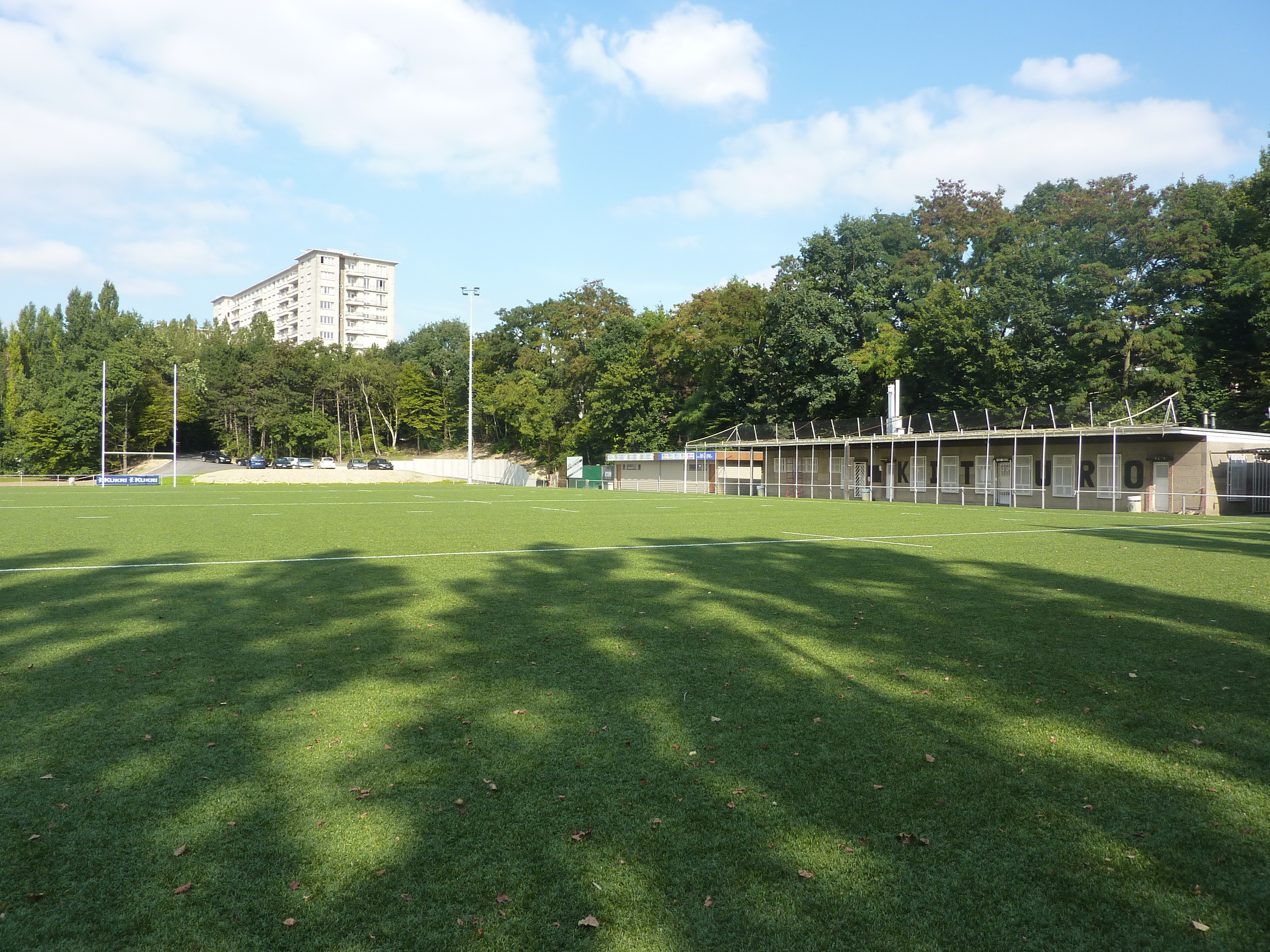
Royal Kituro Rugby Club

== Recent History ==
2017 saw a change of president at the club with Philip Van Perlstein taking over from Claude Orban. At the end of the season Van Perlstein called in Philippe Brantegem from La Hulpe Rugby Club to head up the new coaching staff.

During the 2018/19 mid season break, Kituro announced the arrival of Peter Lang from Scotland as the new assistant coach. Lang was announced as the new head coach for the 2019/20 season. Since 2023, Sébastien Guns is the head coach of the senior teams 1 & 2.

== Honours ==
- Belgian Elite League
  - Champions: 1967, 1996, 2009, 2011, 2015
- Belgian Cup
  - Champions: 1969, 1977, 1981, 1983, 1993, 1998
- Belgian Super Cup
  - Champions: 2011, 2012
- Belgium Touch Championship
  - 2010, 2011, 2012, 2013, 2014

== Season by Season ==
Season	Tier	Division	League Pos.	Play Offs	Notes
2003–04	2	Belgian 2nd Division	4		
2004–05	2	Belgian 2nd Division	5		
2005–06	2	Belgian 2nd Division	1		
2006–07	2	Belgian 2nd Division	4		
2007–08	2	Belgian 2nd Division	2		Promoted
2008–09	1	Belgian Elite League	2	Champions	
2009–10	1	Belgian Elite League	3	Semi-Finalists	
2010–11	1	Belgian Elite League	1	Champions	
2011–12	1	Belgian Elite League	1	Runners Up	
2012–13	1	Belgian Elite League	3	Semi-Finalists	
2013–14	1	Belgian Elite League	3	Semi-Finalists	
2014–15	1	Belgian Elite League	1	Champions	
2015–16	1	Belgian Elite League	5		
2016–17	1	Belgian Elite League	6		
2017–18	1	Belgian Elite League	6		
2018–19	1	Belgian Elite League	6		
2019–20	1	Belgian Elite League	Pandemic covid		
2020–21	1	Belgian Elite League	Pandemic covid		
2021–22	1	Belgian Elite League	5		
2022-23	1	Belgian Elite League	5		
2023–24	1	Belgian Elite League	5		
2024–25	1	Belgian Elite League		Semi-Finalists	
2025–26	1	Belgian Elite League			

== Other teams of the Club ==
With 650 players, Kituro RC is one of the biggest rugby club in Belgium.

Rugby school begins at age 5 with the U6s. The "young-school" includes the U6, U8, U10, and U12 categories. These categories are mixed boys and girls. The "Teen-school" includes the U14, U16, and U18 teams, each of these categories consisting of two teams.

The young women older than 14 play in the Ovalies team and join the Ladies in the senior division.

The men seniors are divided into three categories: Seniors 1 and 2 (playing in the Belgian first division of rugby), and Seniors 3 and 4 (playing in the Belgian third national division of rugby). Finally, a veterans team (35+ years) brings together players playing in this championship. The club also has a touch rugby team, a walking rugby team, and a rugby sevens team.

== Notable players ==
- Vincent Debaty
- Jimmy Parker
- Julien Berger
- Charles Reynaert
- Maxime Jadot
- Mathias Remue

== See also ==
- Rugby union in Belgium
- Belgian Elite League
