= Boitsfort Rugby Club =

(Belgium) Boitsfort RC
- Full name: Boitsfort Rugby Club
- Union: Belgian Rugby Federation
- Founded: 1970
- Location: Boitsfort, Brussels, Belgium
- Ground(s): Plateau de la Foresterie, Brussels
- League(s): Belgian Elite League
- 2012/13: 1st (League Stage)
Team kit

Official website
- www.brclub.org

Boitsfort Rugby Club is a Belgian rugby union club currently competing in the Belgian Elite League.

The club is based in Brussels suburb of Boitsfort in the Brussels Capital Region. The official colours of the club are blue and white.

== History ==
The club was founded in 1970 and has won the Belgian Elite League title on sixteen occasions most recently in 2010 and have won the league on twelve occasions.

In the 2011/12 season they finished the regular season in third place. They are one of the most successful clubs in Belgian Rugby history having dominated the league since 1990.

As from the 2018/2029, a third squad (the “BRC3”) has been introduced in the last division championship. Gathering veterans members having played at the highest level before getting older and sports enthusiasts of the same generation (known as the “XV Cors”), it also includes newer players and therefore strongly contributes to the famous team spirit of the club. The most recent community activities of the BRC3 included the construction of a new hospital in Boitsfort called “La Clinique des XV Corps”, in Rue de la Pignolle, close to the Foresterie Stadium.

== Honours ==
- Belgian Elite League
  - Champions: 1990, 1991, 1992, 1993, 1995, 1997, 1999, 2001, 2002, 2003, 2004, 2005, 2006, 2007, 2008, 2010
- Belgian Cup
  - Champions: 1990, 1995, 1996, 1997, 1999, 2002, 2003, 2004, 2005, 2006, 2007, 2008, 2011
- Belgian 2nd Division
  - Champions: 1976
- North Sea Cup
  - Runners up: 2013

== Season by Season ==
Season	Tier	Division	League Pos.	Play Offs	Notes
2003–04	1	Belgian Elite League	1	Champions	Cup Champions
2004–05	1	Belgian Elite League	1	Champions	Cup Champions
2005–06	1	Belgian Elite League	1	Champions	Cup Champions
2006–07	1	Belgian Elite League	1	Champions	Cup Champions
2007–08	1	Belgian Elite League	1	Champions	Cup Champions
2008–09	1	Belgian Elite League	5		
2009–10	2	Belgian Elite League	2	Champions	
2010–11	1	Belgian Elite League	3	Runner Up	Cup Champions
2011–12	1	Belgian Elite League	3	Semi-Finalists	
2012–13	1	Belgian Elite League	1	Semi-Finalists	

== See also ==
- Rugby union in Belgium
- Belgian Elite League
- Belgian Cup (Rugby Union)
