= ASUB Waterloo =

Belgian rugby union club

(Belgium) ASUB Waterloo
- Full name: ASUB Rugby Waterloo
- Union: Belgian Rugby Federation
- Founded: 1959
- Location: Waterloo, Belgium
- Ground(s): Complexe sportif du Pachy, Waterloo
- League: Belgian Elite League
- 2012/13: 2nd
Team kit

Official website
- www.asub-rugby.be

ASUB Rugby Waterloo is a Belgian rugby union club currently competing in the Belgian Elite League.

The club is based in Waterloo in the Walloon Brabant province of Belgium. The official colours of the club are a combition of dark and marine blue.

== History ==
The club was founded in 1959 and has won the Belgian Elite League title on 15 occasions most recently in 2013 and have won the Belgian Cup twelve times. Along with Boitsfort RC they have dominated Rugby Union in Belgium but have not managed to match their previous successes over the last decade. ASUB were runners up in the Elite League playoffs in four consecutive seasons between 2004–05 and 2007-2008 on each occasion to Boitsfort RC

In the 2011/12 season they finished the regular season in fifth place.

== Honours ==
- Belgian Elite League
  - Champions: 1963, 1965, 1968, 1969, 1978, 1979, 1980, 1984, 1986, 1987, 1988, 1989, 1994, 1998, 2013
- Belgian Cup
  - Champions: 1968, 1979, 1984, 1985, 1986, 1987, 1988, 1991, 1992, 1994, 2001, 2009
- Belgian Super Cup
  - Champions: 2009, 2014, 2015, 2016

== Season by Season ==
Season	Tier	Division	League Pos.	Play Offs	Notes
2003–04	1	Belgian Elite League	4	???	
2004–05	1	Belgian Elite League	2	Runners Up	
2005–06	1	Belgian Elite League	3	Runners Up	
2006–07	1	Belgian Elite League	2	Runners Up	
2007–08	1	Belgian Elite League	3	Runners Up	
2008–09	1	Belgian Elite League	1	Semi-Finals	Cup Champions
2009–10	1	Belgian Elite League	1	Runners Up	
2010–11	1	Belgian Elite League	6		
2011–12	1	Belgian Elite League	5		
2012–13	1	Belgian Elite League	—		

== See also ==
- Rugby union in Belgium
- Belgian Elite League
- Belgian Cup (Rugby Union)
