= Belgian Elite League =

Rugby competition

- Sport: Rugby union
- Instituted: 1937
- Number of teams: 10
- Country: Belgium
- Holders: RC Soignies (2025–26)
- Website: https://www.rugby.be

The Belgian Elite League is the top flight men's competition for rugby union in Belgium. It is classified as semi-professional.

== Teams ==
As of the 2023/24 season The Elite League has ten teams:

- ASUB Waterloo
- Boitsfort RC
- Coq Mosan
- RC La Hulpe
- Dendermonde Rugby Club
- Royal Kituro Rugby Club Schaarbeek
- RC Soignies
- Rugby Ottignies Club
- RFC Liègeois Rugby
- RC Frameries

== Champions ==
- 1937 : Antwerp British Sport Club
- 1938 : Royal Beerschot AC
- 1939 : RSCAnderlecht-Rugby
- 1946 : RSCAnderlecht-Rugby
- 1947 : RSCAnderlecht-Rugby
- 1948 : RSCAnderlecht-Rugby
- 1949 : RSCAnderlecht-Rugby
- 1950 : RSCAnderlecht-Rugby
- 1951 : RSCAnderlecht-Rugby
- 1952 : RSCAnderlecht-Rugby
- 1953 : RSCAnderlecht-Rugby
- 1954 : RSCAnderlecht-Rugby
- 1955 : RSCAnderlecht-Rugby
- 1956 : RSCAnderlecht-Rugby
- 1957 : Racing Jet Bruxelles
- 1958 : RSCAnderlecht-Rugby
- 1959 : RSCAnderlecht-Rugby
- 1960 : Racing Jet Bruxelles
- 1961 : Racing Jet Bruxelles
- 1962 : Racing Jet Bruxelles
- 1963 : ASUB Waterloo
- 1964 : RSCAnderlecht-Rugby
- 1965 : ASUB Waterloo
- 1966 : RSCAnderlecht-Rugby
- 1967 : Kituro Schaerbeek RC
- 1968 : ASUB Waterloo
- 1969 : ASUB Waterloo
- 1970 : RSCAnderlecht-Rugby
- 1971 : RSCAnderlecht-Rugby
- 1972 : RSCAnderlecht-Rugby
- 1973 : BUC Saint-Josse RC
- 1974 : RSCAnderlecht-Rugby
- 1975 : Coq Mosan
- 1976 : Coq Mosan
- 1977 : Coq Mosan
- 1978 : ASUB Waterloo
- 1979 : ASUB Waterloo
- 1980 : ASUB Waterloo
- 1981 : Coq Mosan
- 1982 : Coq Mosan
- 1983 : Coq Mosan
- 1984 : ASUB Waterloo
- 1985 : Brussels British
- 1986 : ASUB Waterloo
- 1987 : ASUB Waterloo
- 1988 : ASUB Waterloo
- 1989 : ASUB Waterloo
- 1990 : Boitsfort RC
- 1991 : Boitsfort RC
- 1992 : Boitsfort RC
- 1993 : Boitsfort RC
- 1994 : ASUB Waterloo
- 1995 : Boitsfort RC
- 1996 : Royal Kituro Rugby Club Schaerbeek
- 1997 : Boitsfort RC
- 1998 : ASUB Waterloo
- 1999 : Boitsfort RC
- 2000 : RC Visé
- 2001 : Boitsfort RC
- 2002 : Boitsfort RC
- 2003 : Boitsfort RC
- 2004 : Boitsfort RC
- 2005 : Boitsfort RC
- 2006 : Boitsfort RC
- 2006-07 : Boitsfort RC
- 2007-08 : Boitsfort RC
- 2008-09 : Royal Kituro Rugby Club Schaerbeek
- 2009-10 : Boitsfort RC
- 2010-11 : Royal Kituro Rugby Club Schaerbeek
- 2011-12 : Dendermondse RC
- 2012-13 : ASUB Waterloo
- 2013-14 : ASUB Waterloo
- 2014-15 : Royal Kituro Rugby Club Schaerbeek
- 2015-16 : Dendermondse RC
- 2016-17 : Dendermondse RC
- 2017-18 : Dendermondse RC
- 2018-19 : Rugby Club La Hulpe
- 2019-20 : Cancelled due to the COVID-19 pandemic
- 2020-21 : Cancelled due to the COVID-19 pandemic
- 2021-22 : Rugby Club La Hulpe
- 2022-23 : Dendermonde RC
- 2023-24 : Dendermonde RC
- 2024-25 : Dendermonde RC
- 2025–26 : RC Soignies

== See also ==
- Belgian Rugby Federation
- Rugby union in Belgium
- Brussels Barbarians
