= Brussels Barbarians =

- Full name: Brussels Barbarians Rugby Football Club
- Nickname: The Babas
- Founded: 1968
- Ground: The Elephant Pitch
- President: Jimmy Parker
- League: Flander's Regional 1st Division
- 2011-2012: 4th
| 1st kit | 2nd kit |

The Brussels Barbarians were a rugby union club in Belgium. Founded in 1968 as the Brussels British, the club changed its name to the Barbarians in 2000. In 2014, it merged with the Brussels Celtics to form the BBRFC Celtic.

The "Babas" as they were known were one of two expatriate rugby clubs in Belgium. The club consisted of two men's teams, playing matches every Sunday afternoon between September and May in the Flander's Regional 1st Division. Matches were played throughout Belgium.

The Brussels Barbarians' home ground, named the Elephant Pitch, is in Tervuren, a suburb of Brussels. The club is a partner club of Saracens.

== History ==
In September 1968 James D Adams and fiancée Judy Robb formed a rugby club to play on Saturdays, unlike the Belgian League which played on Sundays, in order to celebrate after the match. As a result, the club did not play in the Belgian League but arranged fixtures with South Coast English sides, and British Army and Dutch teams. In 1970, the second team was established, and in 1972 the club beat the Belgian National side and won the Belgian Cup. In 1973, the third team was launched, and the club had fixtures against Coventry, Blackheath, Newbridge and Public School Wanderers.

In 1974 the Barbarians won the Belgian Cup for the second time, and in May 1978 they went on a successful seven-match tour of the USA, winning all their games.

Jozzekk williams

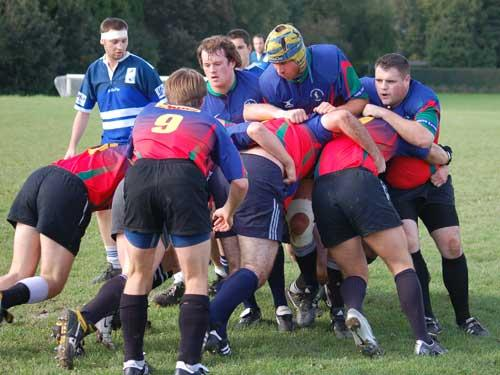
The Babas in a match

In 1980 the club entered the Belgian League division five. After winning promotion in successive seasons, they won the Premier Division championship in their year, in 1985. At the end of that season the club celebrated with a third major tour, to Colorado, USA. They have since been on tours to Spain, Czechoslovakia, Boston, Estonia and Mallorca. In 1982 they won the Belgian Cup for the third time and toured Canada.

The club organised international charity rugby matches in 1986, 1987, 1990 and 1991, bringing many of the top rugby players from the Five Nations of the 1970s and early 1980s to Belgium to play against a Belgian Select side, which raised over 2.5 million Francs for various charities. The last occasion in 1991 was for the support of the Belgian wife and children of Brussels British's captain Leslie Joyce following his death in a car crash a few months earlier.

The majority of players come from Great Britain and Ireland. At one point, all three sons of the ambassador of Western Samoa played for the club. The eldest of these, Vince Fepuleia, went on to play for Western Samoa against Wales at Cardiff Arms Park in 1988.

During the mid-1980s the Barbarians fielded a first 15 with players from 11 different countries. In 2003, the Barbarians had 22 nations represented in its player list, including players from countries without a strong Rugby tradition. One former player, Freddy Thielemans, served as Mayor of Brussels in 1994.

=== Honours ===
- Belgian League Champions: 1985
- Belgian Cup Champions: 1972, 1974, 1982, finalist in 2005
- Dutch/Belgian ING Plate, finalist in 2005

== See also ==
- Australian Barbarians
- Fiji Barbarians
- French Barbarians
- New Zealand Barbarians
- South African Barbarians
