= Coq Mosan =

Belgian rugby union club

(Belgium) Coq Mosan
- Full name: Rugby Coq Mosan
- Union: Belgian Rugby Federation
- Founded: 1967
- Location: Berneau, Liège, Belgium
- Ground(s): Longchamps, Berneau
- League(s): Belgian Elite League
- 2011/12: 1st Belgian 2nd Division
Team kit

Official website
- www.rugbycoqmosan.be

Rugby Coq Mosan is a Belgian rugby union club currently competing in the Belgian Elite League.

The club is based in Berneau in the municipality of Dalhem near Liège in Belgium. The official colours of the club are black and white.

== History ==
The club was founded in 1967, has won the Belgian Elite League title on six occasions most recently in 1983 and have won the Belgian Cup four times.

In the 2021/2022 season they finished the regular season as champions of Division Two and were therefore promoted in the Elite League.

== Honours ==
- Belgian Elite League
  - Champions: 1975, 1976, 1977, 1981, 1982, 1983
- Belgian Cup
  - Champions: 1970, 1978, 1980,1989
- Belgian 2nd Division
  - Champions: 1968, 1992, 2012, 2022

== See also ==
- Rugby union in Belgium
- Belgian Elite League
- Belgian Cup (Rugby Union)
