= RC Soignies =

Belgian rugby union club, based in Soignies

(Belgium) RC Soignies
- Full name: Rugby Club Soignes
- Union: Belgian Rugby Federation
- Founded: 1973; 53 years ago
- Location: Soignies, Hainaut, Belgium
- Ground: Chemin Tour Lette
- League: Belgian Elite League
- 2011/12: 7th
Team kit

Official website
- www.rugbyclubsoignies.be

RC Soignies is a Belgian rugby union club currently competing in the Belgian Elite League.

The club is based in Soignies in Hainaut. The official colours of the club are green and white.

== History ==
The club was founded in 1973 and has never won the Belgian Elite League but recently won the Belgian Cup for the first time.

In 2015, RC Soignies were beaten by a record 356-3 by Royal Kituro. The referee for the fixture arrived over an hour after the scheduled start time, during this period, most of the Soignies players left as they believed the match had been cancelled. The remaining players seemingly allowed the Kituro players to run unchallenged to score 56 tries and 38 conversions as a protest.

== Honours ==
- Belgian Cup
  - Champions: 2010
- Belgian 2nd Division
  - Champions: 1979
- Belgian Super Cup
  - Champions 2010

== Current squad ==
Information based on team sheets published by Sportkipik

The RC Soignies squad for the 2026–27 Division 1 season
**Props**: (Belgium) **Samuel Opsomer**^{BD}; (Belgium) **Bruno Vliegen**^{BD}; (Belgium) Victor Baise; (Belgium) Charles Garin; (Belgium) Loïc Montoisy; **Hookers**: (Belgium) Géraud Waterlot; (Belgium) Florent Michel; (Belgium) Justin Blomme-Defrere; **Locks**: (Belgium) **Tom Calomme**^{BD}; (Belgium) Igor Delelienne; (Belgium) **Romain Honhon**; (Belgium) Gaspard Delelienne	**Back row**: (Belgium) **Jacques Genin**^{BD}; (Belgium) François Broeckx; (Belgium) Ilian Naimi; (Belgium) Théo Speeckaert; (Belgium) Thibaut Platevoet; (Belgium) Roch Doucenet; (Belgium) Paul Rousseau; **Scrum-halves**: (Belgium) **Curtis Moucheron**^{BD}; (Belgium) Louis Speeckaert; **Fly-halves**: (Belgium) Matthéo Van Holsbeke^{BD}	**Centres**: (Belgium) **Marius Dehoust**^{BD}; (Belgium) Basile Dascotte^{BD}; (Belgium) Loïc Quintart; **Wings**: (Belgium) Quentin Lefebvre; (Belgium) Valentin Hoebeke; (Belgium) Emilien Lestarquy; **Fullbacks**: (Belgium) Antoine Vegis^{BD}; (Belgium) Liam Janssens
(c) denotes the team captain, **Bold** denotes internationally capped players. ^{BD} denotes Brussels Devils capped players.^{*} denotes players qualified to play for Belgium on residency or dual nationality.

== See also ==
- Rugby union in Belgium
- Belgian Elite League
- Belgian Cup (Rugby Union)
