= RC Frameries =

Belgian rugby union club, based in Frameries

(Belgium) RC Frameries
- Full name: Rugby Club Frameries
- Union: Belgian Rugby Federation
- Founded: 1966; 60 years ago
- Location: Frameries, Hainaut, Belgium
- Ground: Cité Piérard
- President: (Belgium) Alain Urbain
- Coach(es): (France) Olivier Taviaux (Spain) Salvador Rodriguez Jimenez (Belgium) Frédéric Bourdiaud'Huy
- League: Belgian Elite League
- 2012/13: 5th
1st kit	2nd kit	3rd kit

Official website
- www.rugbyframeries.be

RC Frameries is a Belgian rugby union club currently competing in the Belgian Elite League.

The club is based in Frameries in Hainaut. The official colours of the club are yellow and black.

== History ==
The club was founded in 1966 and has never won the Belgian Elite League but did finish as runners up in the 2008/09 season. Their only victory in the Belgian Cup was in 1971.

== Honours ==
- Belgian Elite League
  - Finalist: 2009
- Belgian Super Cup
  - Finalist: 2012
- Belgian Cup
  - Champions: 1971
  - Finalist: 2012
- Toledo Plate
  - Champions: 1982, 1983, 2001
- Belgian 2nd Division
  - Champions: 1971, 1980, 1991, 2004

== Current squad ==
Information based on team sheets published by Sportkipik

The RC Frameries squad for the 2026–27 Division 1 season
**Props**: (Belgium) Valentin Regau; (Belgium) Jules Deschryver; (Belgium) Robin Canart; (Belgium) Niels Daloze; (Belgium) Adelin Mehrez; **Hookers**: (Belgium) Tristan Devriese; (Belgium) Alexandre Sortino; (Belgium) Antonys Musin; (Belgium) Joachim Piérart^{BD}; **Locks**: (Belgium) Jules Bultez; (Belgium) Guillaume Delval; (Belgium) Robin Deligne	**Back row**: (Belgium) Simon Rimac^{BD}; (Belgium) Gaspard Scoriel; (Belgium) Hubert Burhin; (Belgium) Esteban Goessens; (Belgium) Uriel Bouillon; (Belgium) Lucien Bultez; **Scrum-halves**: (Belgium) Nathan Delwarte; (Belgium) Brian Williams; (Belgium) Tom Lambert; **Fly-halves**: (Argentina) Agustin Beorlegui; (Belgium) Noé Finfe^{BD}	**Centres**: (Belgium) Tim Seghers; (Belgium) Jean-Luc Abena; (Belgium) Nathan Canart; **Wings**: (Belgium) Timothin Lobet; (Belgium) Raphaël Demoulin; (Belgium) Timeo Durez; **Fullbacks**: (Belgium) Charles Depasse; (Belgium) Liam Anciaux
(c) denotes the team captain, **Bold** denotes internationally capped players. ^{BD} denotes Brussels Devils capped players.^{*} denotes players qualified to play for Belgium on residency or dual nationality.

== See also ==
- Rugby union in Belgium
- Belgian Elite League
- Belgian Cup (Rugby Union)
