= Rugby union in Belgium =

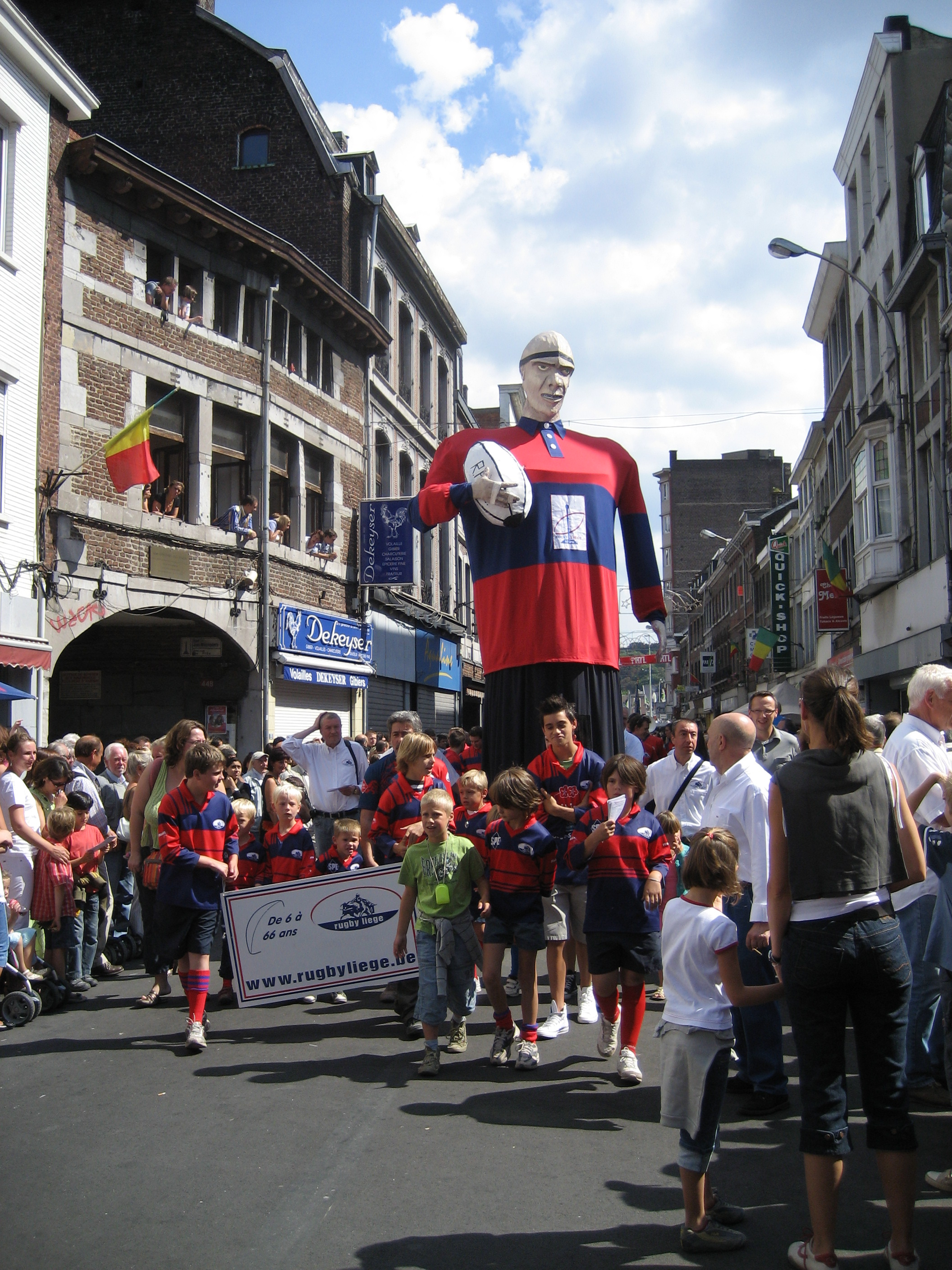
- Belgian rugby goes to the carnival: the Giant Xhovémont in the streets of Outremeuse in Liège, 15 August 2008
- Country: Belgium
- Governing body: Belgian Rugby Federation
- National team: Belgium
- Registered players: 36,266
- Clubs: 58

National competitions
- Rugby World Cup; Rugby World Cup Sevens; IRB Sevens World Series; European Nations Cup

Club competitions
- Belgian Elite League; Belgian Cup

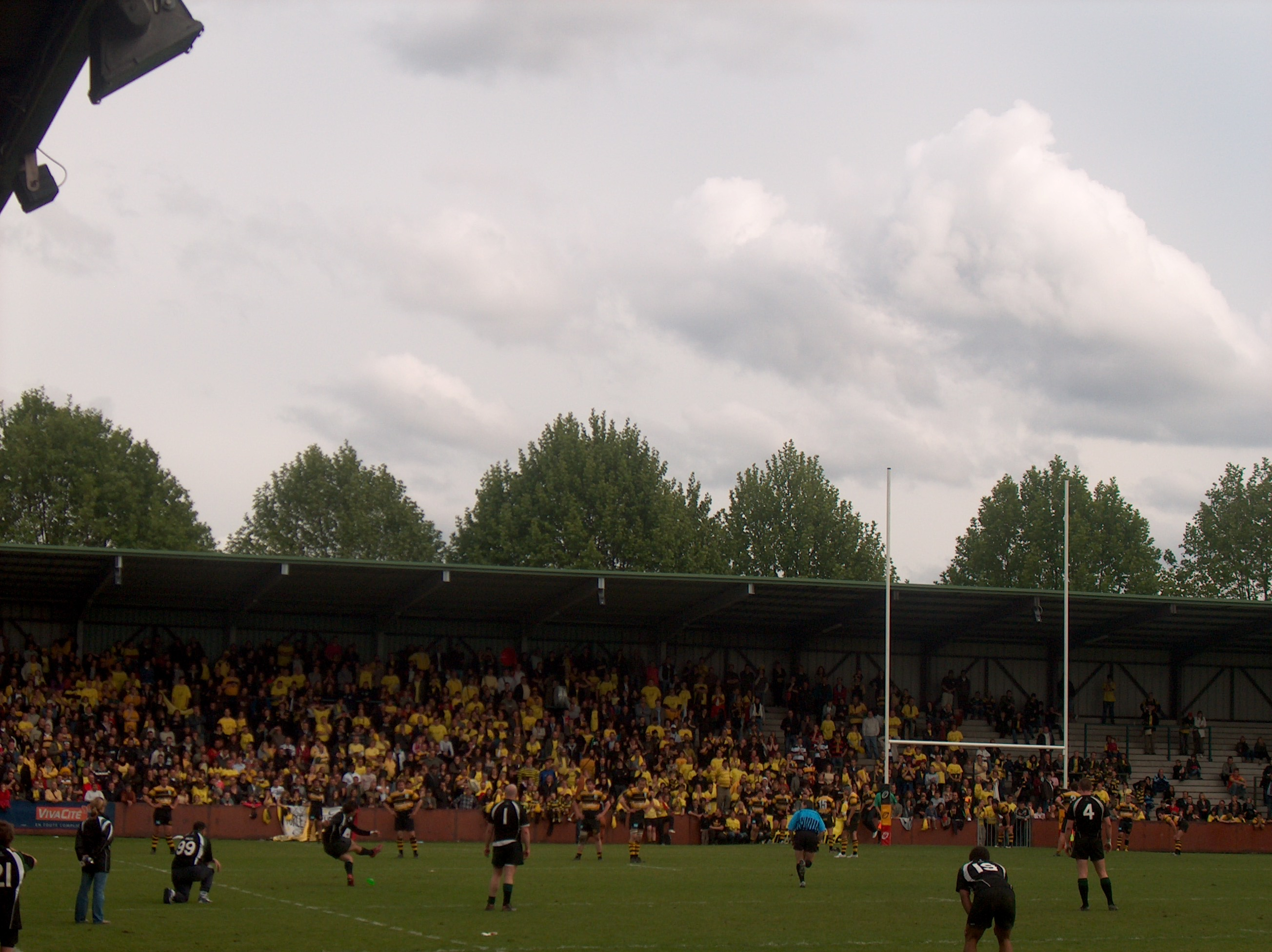
Romain Orban of Kituro Rugby Club scores the winning conversion in the last second of the final of the Belgian Rugby Championship, 2009

Rugby union in Belgium is a growing sport. The national governing body for rugby union in Belgium is the Belgian Rugby Federation. The national team plays in the Rugby Europe Championship, and as of March 2025 they are ranked twenty second in the World Rugby Rankings.

== Governing body ==
The national governing body for rugby union in Belgium is the Belgian Rugby Federation (FBRB - Fédération Belge de Rugby in French and Belgische Rugby Bond in Dutch) which is headquartered in Brussels. The Belgian Rugby Federation was formed in 1931, and joined the IRFB in 1988.

Rugby union is governed by two regional bodies that answer to FBRB, the national governing body. Most of the clubs in the northern region of Belgium are governed by the Vlaamse Rugby Bond (VRB). The remaining clubs are governed by the Ligue Belge Francophone de Rugby (LBFR).

Rugby union in Belgium is also structured into four districts for competition purposes. These districts are; Brabant, Hainaut, Liège/Namur/Luxembourg, and Flanders.

Within these districts, there are also several leagues and divisions that are structured based on the skill level of the clubs.

== History ==
For a long time, Belgian rugby's most high-profile personality was the former international referee, Teddy Lacroix, who became president of the union.

Rugby union in Belgium has not been popular historically, but due to its recent international successes, it is a quickly growing sport. As of the December 2007, more than half of the nearly seven thousand registered players are pre-teens or teenagers. In addition, there are currently forty-eight domestic clubs that compete against each other on various levels.

=== Notable players ===
Notable Belgian rugby players include:

- Jacques Rogge, best known as the eighth president of the International Olympic Committee (IOC), played on the Belgium national rugby team.
- John Raphael, born and died in Belgium, but moved to England as a child and was educated there. He was capped nine times for England in 1905 and 1906. In 1910 he captained the British Lions in a tour of Argentina, consisting of the South American nation's inaugural Test match.
- James Atkins
- Oli Hockley
- Jimmy Parker
- Vincent Debaty

== National team ==
The national team, nicknamed the Black Devils (Zwarte Duivels), has been competing in international tests since 1932.

=== 2006-08 European Nations Cup ===
The national team competed in competition in the Second Division at the 2010-2012 European Nations Cup winning the division and securing promotion to Division 1A for the next season.

Date	City	Opponent	Results¹	Attendance	Type of game
12 February 2011	Brussels	Moldova	20-5	???	European Nations Cup
12 March 2011	Gdynia	Poland	21-28	???	European Nations Cup
19 March 2011	Brussels	Germany	28-25	???	European Nations Cup
23 April 2011	Amsterdam	Netherlands	30-18	???	European Nations Cup
5 November 2011	Brussels	Czech Republic	55-0	???	European Nations Cup
25 February 2012	Brussels	Netherlands	58-3	???	European Nations Cup
10 March 2012	Chișinău	Moldova	17-16	???	European Nations Cup
17 March 2012	Heusenstamm	Germany	30-29	???	European Nations Cup
7 April 2012	Brussels	Poland	20-13	???	European Nations Cup

¹ Results from Belgian view

== See also ==
- Belgian Rugby Federation
- Belgium national rugby union team
- Belgium national rugby sevens team
- Belgium women's national rugby union team
- Belgian Elite League
