= Belgian Rugby Federation =

Sports federation in Belgium

Fédération Belge de Rugby Belgische Rugby Bond
- Sport: Rugby union
- Founded: 1931; 94 years ago
- World Rugby affiliation: 1988
- Rugby Europe affiliation: 1934
- President: (Belgium) Michiel Leysen
- Men's coach: (France) Laurent Dossat
- Website: www.rugby.be

The Belgian Rugby Federation (Note: (FBRB – Fédération Belge de Rugby in French and Belgische Rugby Bond in Dutch)) is the governing body for rugby union in Belgium. The Belgian Federation of Rugby (FBRB) is responsible for organizing and developing rugby union in Belgium.

It was founded in 1931 and became affiliated with World Rugby, who were called the International Rugby Board then, in 1988. It includes the provincial districts, clubs, managers, players, coaches, educators and officials, to contribute to the practice and development of rugby in all communities in Belgium. It is an organization that brings together the LBFR (Ligue Belge Francophone de Rugby) and VRB (Vlaamse Rugby Bond). They are members of several sports organizations: a full member of World Rugby (1988), a member of the Belgian Olympic and Interfederal Committee (BOIC), founding member (1934) of Rugby Europe and honorary member of the Rugby Football Union.

== History ==
The Belgian federation, created on 24 November 1931 (a founding member of FIRA – Association Européenne de Rugby, 2 January 1934) is one of the oldest European federations. It was created at the initiative of the French Rugby Club (established in 1930 by Jean Rey, a future first coach of the national team), although it is the British of British Sport Club of Antwerp (founded in 1919 to section the initiative of Henri Truyens) and Brussels (1925) who implanted rugby in Belgium. The first Board of Directors was held on 20 January 1932 and the first match of the Belgium national rugby union team was organized for 13 March 1932 in the Netherlands, ending in a 6-6 draw.

== See also ==
- Belgium national rugby union team
- Rugby union in Belgium
